= Listed buildings in North Yorkshire =

Buildings of special importance in North Yorkshire, England

There are a number of listed buildings in North Yorkshire. The term "listed building", in the United Kingdom, refers to a building or structure designated as being of special architectural, historical, or cultural significance. Details of all the listed buildings are contained in the National Heritage List for England. They are categorised in three grades: Grade I consists of buildings of outstanding architectural or historical interest, Grade II* includes significant buildings of more than local interest and Grade II consists of buildings of special architectural or historical interest. Buildings in England are listed by the Secretary of State for Culture, Media and Sport on recommendations provided by English Heritage, which also determines the grading.

Some listed buildings are looked after by the National Trust or English Heritage while others are in private ownership or administered by trusts.

== Listed buildings by grade ==
- Grade I listed buildings in North Yorkshire
- Grade II* listed buildings in North Yorkshire

== Listed buildings by civil parish or ward ==
The lists are by parishes in parished areas and for the unparished areas, they are by electoral wards.

- Listed buildings in Acaster Malbis
- Listed buildings in Acaster Selby
- Listed buildings in Acklam, Ryedale
- Listed buildings in Ainderby Miers with Holtby
- Listed buildings in Ainderby Quernhow
- Listed buildings in Ainderby Steeple
- Listed buildings in Airton
- Listed buildings in Aiskew and Leeming Bar
- Listed buildings in Aislaby, Ryedale
- Listed buildings in Aislaby, Scarborough
- Listed buildings in Akebar
- Listed buildings in Aldbrough St John
- Listed buildings in Aldfield
- Listed buildings in Aldwark, Hambleton
- Listed buildings in Allerston
- Listed buildings in Allerton Mauleverer with Hopperton
- Listed buildings in Alne, North Yorkshire
- Listed buildings in Amotherby
- Listed buildings in Ampleforth
- Listed buildings in Appleton East and West
- Listed buildings in Appleton Roebuck
- Listed buildings in Appleton Wiske
- Listed buildings in Appleton-le-Moors
- Listed buildings in Appleton-le-Street with Easthorpe
- Listed buildings in Appletreewick
- Listed buildings in Arkendale
- Listed buildings in Arkengarthdale
- Listed buildings in Arncliffe, North Yorkshire
- Listed buildings in Asenby
- Listed buildings in Aske, North Yorkshire
- Listed buildings in Askham Bryan
- Listed buildings in Askham Richard
- Listed buildings in Askrigg
- Listed buildings in Askwith
- Listed buildings in Austwick
- Listed buildings in Aysgarth
- Listed buildings in Azerley
- Listed buildings in Bagby
- Listed buildings in Bainbridge, North Yorkshire
- Listed buildings in Baldersby
- Listed buildings in Balk, North Yorkshire
- Listed buildings in Bank Newton
- Listed buildings in Barden, Craven
- Listed buildings in Barden, Richmondshire
- Listed buildings in Barkston Ash
- Listed buildings in Barlby with Osgodby
- Listed buildings in Barnby, North Yorkshire
- Listed buildings in Barton, North Yorkshire
- Listed buildings in Barton-le-Street
- Listed buildings in Barton-le-Willows
- Listed buildings in Barugh (Great and Little)
- Listed buildings in Beadlam
- Listed buildings in Beamsley
- Listed buildings in Beckwithshaw
- Listed buildings in Bedale
- Listed buildings in Bellerby
- Listed buildings in Beningbrough
- Listed buildings in Bentham, North Yorkshire
- Listed buildings in Bewerley
- Listed buildings in Bilbrough
- Listed buildings in Bilsdale Midcable
- Listed buildings in Bilton-in-Ainsty with Bickerton
- Listed buildings in Birdforth
- Listed buildings in Birdsall, North Yorkshire
- Listed buildings in Birkby, North Yorkshire
- Listed buildings in Birkin
- Listed buildings in Birstwith
- Listed buildings in Bishopthorpe
- Listed buildings in Bishop Monkton
- Listed buildings in Bishop Thornton, Shaw Mills and Warsill
- Listed buildings in Bishopdale, North Yorkshire
- Listed buildings in Blubberhouses
- Listed buildings in Boltby
- Listed buildings in Bolton Abbey
- Listed buildings in Bolton Percy
- Listed buildings in Bolton-on-Swale
- Listed buildings in Boroughbridge
- Listed buildings in Borrowby, east North Yorkshire
- Listed buildings in Borrowby, west North Yorkshire
- Listed buildings in Bradley, North Yorkshire
- Listed buildings in Brafferton and Helperby
- Listed buildings in Brandsby-cum-Stearsby
- Listed buildings in Bransdale
- Listed buildings in Brawby
- Listed buildings in Brayton, North Yorkshire
- Listed buildings in Brearton
- Listed buildings in Brompton, east North Yorkshire
- Listed buildings in Brompton, west North Yorkshire
- Listed buildings in Brompton-on-Swale
- Listed buildings in Brotherton
- Listed buildings in Brough with St Giles
- Listed buildings in Broughton, west North Yorkshire
- Listed buildings in Broxa-cum-Troutsdale
- Listed buildings in Buckden, North Yorkshire
- Listed buildings in Bulmer, North Yorkshire
- Listed buildings in Burn, North Yorkshire
- Listed buildings in Burneston
- Listed buildings in Burniston
- Listed buildings in Burnsall
- Listed buildings in Burrill with Cowling
- Listed buildings in Burton Leonard
- Listed buildings in Burton Salmon
- Listed buildings in Burton in Lonsdale
- Listed buildings in Burton-cum-Walden
- Listed buildings in Burton-on-Yore
- Listed buildings in Burythorpe
- Listed buildings in Buttercrambe with Bossall
- Listed buildings in Byland with Wass
- Listed buildings in Byram cum Sutton
- Listed buildings in Caldbergh with East Scrafton
- Listed buildings in Caldwell, North Yorkshire
- Listed buildings in Calton, North Yorkshire
- Listed buildings in Camblesforth
- Listed buildings in Carleton-in-Craven
- Listed buildings in Carlton, Selby
- Listed buildings in Carlton in Cleveland
- Listed buildings in Carlton Highdale
- Listed buildings in Carlton Husthwaite
- Listed buildings in Carlton Miniott
- Listed buildings in Carlton Town
- Listed buildings in Carperby-cum-Thoresby
- Listed buildings in Carthorpe
- Listed buildings in Castle Bolton with East and West Bolton
- Listed buildings in Castley
- Listed buildings in Cattal
- Listed buildings in Catterick, North Yorkshire
- Listed buildings in Cawood
- Listed buildings in Cawton
- Listed buildings in Cayton
- Listed buildings in Chapel Haddlesey
- Listed buildings in Church Fenton
- Listed buildings in Clapham cum Newby
- Listed buildings in Claxton, North Yorkshire
- Listed buildings in Cleasby
- Listed buildings in Cliffe, Selby
- Listed buildings in Clifton-on-Yore
- Listed buildings in Clint cum Hamlets
- Listed buildings in Cloughton
- Listed buildings in Colburn, North Yorkshire
- Listed buildings in Cold Kirby
- Listed buildings in Colton, North Yorkshire
- Listed buildings in Commondale
- Listed buildings in Coneysthorpe
- Listed buildings in Coniston Cold
- Listed buildings in Conistone with Kilnsey
- Listed buildings in Cononley
- Listed buildings in Constable Burton
- Listed buildings in Copgrove
- Listed buildings in Copmanthorpe
- Listed buildings in Copt Hewick
- Listed buildings in Coulton, North Yorkshire
- Listed buildings in Coverham with Agglethorpe
- Listed buildings in Cowesby
- Listed buildings in Cowling, Craven
- Listed buildings in Coxwold
- Listed buildings in Cracoe
- Listed buildings in Crakehall
- Listed buildings in Crambe, North Yorkshire
- Listed buildings in Crathorne, North Yorkshire
- Listed buildings in Crayke
- Listed buildings in Croft-on-Tees
- Listed buildings in Cropton
- Listed buildings in Crosby, North Yorkshire
- Listed buildings in Cundall with Leckby
- Listed buildings in Dacre, North Yorkshire
- Listed buildings in Dalby-cum-Skewsby
- Listed buildings in Dalton, east North Yorkshire
- Listed buildings in Dalton, west North Yorkshire
- Listed buildings in Danby, North Yorkshire
- Listed buildings in Danby Wiske with Lazenby
- Listed buildings in Darley and Menwith
- Listed buildings in Darncombe-cum-Langdale End
- Listed buildings in Deighton, Hambleton
- Listed buildings in Deighton, York
- Listed buildings in Denton, North Yorkshire
- Listed buildings in Dishforth
- Listed buildings in Downholme
- Listed buildings in Draughton, North Yorkshire
- Listed buildings in Drax, North Yorkshire
- Listed buildings in Dunnington
- Listed buildings in Dunsforths
- Listed buildings in Easby, Hambleton
- Listed buildings in Easby, Richmondshire
- Listed buildings in Easingwold
- Listed buildings in East Ayton
- Listed buildings in East Cowton
- Listed buildings in East Harlsey
- Listed buildings in East Hauxwell
- Listed buildings in East Layton
- Listed buildings in East Rounton
- Listed buildings in East Tanfield
- Listed buildings in East Witton
- Listed buildings in Ebberston and Yedingham
- Listed buildings in Edstone
- Listed buildings in Egton
- Listed buildings in Ellenthorpe
- Listed buildings in Ellerbeck
- Listed buildings in Ellerby, North Yorkshire
- Listed buildings in Ellerton Abbey
- Listed buildings in Ellerton-on-Swale
- Listed buildings in Ellington High and Low
- Listed buildings in Elslack
- Listed buildings in Elvington, North Yorkshire
- Listed buildings in Embsay with Eastby
- Listed buildings in Eppleby
- Listed buildings in Eryholme
- Listed buildings in Escrick
- Listed buildings in Eshton
- Listed buildings in Eskdaleside cum Ugglebarnby
- Listed buildings in Exelby, Leeming and Londonderry
- Listed buildings in Faceby
- Listed buildings in Fadmoor
- Listed buildings in Farlington, North Yorkshire
- Listed buildings in Farndale East
- Listed buildings in Farndale West
- Listed buildings in Farnham, North Yorkshire
- Listed buildings in Farnhill
- Listed buildings in Farnley, North Yorkshire
- Listed buildings in Fearby
- Listed buildings in Felixkirk
- Listed buildings in Felliscliffe
- Listed buildings in Ferrensby
- Listed buildings in Fewston
- Listed buildings in Filey
- Listed buildings in Finghall
- Listed buildings in Firby, Hambleton
- Listed buildings in Flasby with Winterburn
- Listed buildings in Flaxby
- Listed buildings in Flaxton, North Yorkshire
- Listed buildings in Folkton
- Listed buildings in Follifoot
- Listed buildings in Forcett
- Listed buildings in Foston, North Yorkshire
- Listed buildings in Fountains Earth
- Listed buildings in Foxholes, North Yorkshire
- Listed buildings in Fryton
- Listed buildings in Fulford, North Yorkshire
- Listed buildings in Fylingdales
- Listed buildings in Ganton
- Listed buildings in Gargrave
- Listed buildings in Gate Helmsley
- Listed buildings in Gateforth
- Listed buildings in Gayles, North Yorkshire
- Listed buildings in Giggleswick
- Listed buildings in Gillamoor
- Listed buildings in Gilling East
- Listed buildings in Gilling with Hartforth and Sedbury
- Listed buildings in Girsby
- Listed buildings in Givendale
- Listed buildings in Glaisdale
- Listed buildings in Glusburn and Cross Hills
- Listed buildings in Goathland
- Listed buildings in Goldsborough, Harrogate
- Listed buildings in Grantley, North Yorkshire
- Listed buildings in Grassington
- Listed buildings in Great Ayton
- Listed buildings in Great Busby
- Listed buildings in Great Langton
- Listed buildings in Great Ouseburn
- Listed buildings in Great Ribston with Walshford
- Listed buildings in Great Smeaton
- Listed buildings in Great Timble
- Listed buildings in Great and Little Broughton
- Listed buildings in Green Hammerton
- Listed buildings in Grewelthorpe
- Listed buildings in Grimston, Selby
- Listed buildings in Grinton
- Listed buildings in Gristhorpe
- Listed buildings in Grosmont, North Yorkshire
- Listed buildings in Habton
- Listed buildings in Hackforth
- Listed buildings in Hackness
- Listed buildings in Halton East
- Listed buildings in Halton Gill
- Listed buildings in Halton West
- Listed buildings in Hambleton, Selby
- Listed buildings in Hampsthwaite
- Listed buildings in Hanlith
- Listed buildings in Harmby
- Listed buildings in Harome
- Listed buildings in Harrogate (Bilton Ward)
- Listed buildings in Harrogate (Granby Ward)
- Listed buildings in Harrogate (Harlow Moor Ward)
- Listed buildings in Harrogate (High Harrogate Ward)
- Listed buildings in Harrogate (Hookstone Ward)
- Listed buildings in Harrogate (Killinghall Ward)
- Listed buildings in Harrogate (Low Harrogate Ward)
- Listed buildings in Harrogate (Rossett Ward)
- Listed buildings in Harrogate (Starbeck Ward)
- Listed buildings in Harrogate (Stray Ward)
- Listed buildings in Harrogate (Woodfield Ward)
- Listed buildings in Hartlington
- Listed buildings in Hartoft
- Listed buildings in Harton, North Yorkshire
- Listed buildings in Hartwith cum Winsley
- Listed buildings in Harwood Dale
- Listed buildings in Hawes
- Listed buildings in Hawkswick
- Listed buildings in Hawnby
- Listed buildings in Hawsker-cum-Stainsacre
- Listed buildings in Haxby
- Listed buildings in Hazlewood with Storiths
- Listed buildings in Healaugh, Selby
- Listed buildings in Healey, North Yorkshire
- Listed buildings in Hebden, North Yorkshire
- Listed buildings in Hellifield
- Listed buildings in Helmsley
- Listed buildings in Hemingbrough
- Listed buildings in Henderskelfe
- Listed buildings in Hensall, North Yorkshire
- Listed buildings in Heslerton
- Listed buildings in Hetton-cum-Bordley
- Listed buildings in High Abbotside
- Listed buildings in High Worsall
- Listed buildings in High and Low Bishopside
- Listed buildings in Hillam
- Listed buildings in Hinderwell
- Listed buildings in Hipswell
- Listed buildings in Holme, North Yorkshire
- Listed buildings in Hood Grange
- Listed buildings in Hornby, Hambleton
- Listed buildings in Hornby, Richmondshire
- Listed buildings in Horton in Ribblesdale
- Listed buildings in Hovingham
- Listed buildings in Howe, North Yorkshire
- Listed buildings in Howsham, North Yorkshire
- Listed buildings in Huby, Hambleton
- Listed buildings in Huddleston with Newthorpe
- Listed buildings in Hudswell, North Yorkshire
- Listed buildings in Hunmanby
- Listed buildings in Hunsingore
- Listed buildings in Hunton, North Yorkshire
- Listed buildings in Husthwaite
- Listed buildings in Hutton Bonville
- Listed buildings in Hutton Buscel
- Listed buildings in Hutton Conyers
- Listed buildings in Hutton Mulgrave
- Listed buildings in Hutton Rudby
- Listed buildings in Hutton Sessay
- Listed buildings in Hutton-le-Hole
- Listed buildings in Huttons Ambo
- Listed buildings in Ilton-cum-Pott
- Listed buildings in Ingleby Arncliffe
- Listed buildings in Ingleby Greenhow
- Listed buildings in Ingleton, North Yorkshire
- Listed buildings in Kearby with Netherby
- Listed buildings in Kelfield, North Yorkshire
- Listed buildings in Kellington
- Listed buildings in Kepwick
- Listed buildings in Kettlewell with Starbotton
- Listed buildings in Kilburn High and Low
- Listed buildings in Kildale
- Listed buildings in Kildwick
- Listed buildings in Killerby, North Yorkshire
- Listed buildings in Killinghall
- Listed buildings in Kiplin
- Listed buildings in Kirby Grindalythe
- Listed buildings in Kirby Hall, Harrogate
- Listed buildings in Kirby Hill, Harrogate
- Listed buildings in Kirby Hill, Richmondshire
- Listed buildings in Kirby Knowle
- Listed buildings in Kirby Misperton
- Listed buildings in Kirby Sigston
- Listed buildings in Kirby Wiske
- Listed buildings in Kirk Deighton
- Listed buildings in Kirk Hammerton
- Listed buildings in Kirk Smeaton
- Listed buildings in Kirkby, North Yorkshire
- Listed buildings in Kirkby Fleetham with Fencote
- Listed buildings in Kirkby Malham
- Listed buildings in Kirkby Malzeard
- Listed buildings in Kirkby Overblow
- Listed buildings in Kirkby Wharfe with North Milford
- Listed buildings in Kirkbymoorside
- Listed buildings in Kirklington-cum-Upsland
- Listed buildings in Knaresborough
- Listed buildings in Knayton with Brawith
- Listed buildings in Landmoth-cum-Catto
- Listed buildings in Langcliffe
- Listed buildings in Langthorne
- Listed buildings in Langthorpe
- Listed buildings in Langton, North Yorkshire
- Listed buildings in Lastingham
- Listed buildings in Laverton, North Yorkshire
- Listed buildings in Lawkland
- Listed buildings in Leake, North Yorkshire
- Listed buildings in Leathley
- Listed buildings in Leavening, North Yorkshire
- Listed buildings in Levisham
- Listed buildings in Leyburn
- Listed buildings in Lillings Ambo
- Listed buildings in Lindley, North Yorkshire
- Listed buildings in Lindrick with Studley Royal and Fountains
- Listed buildings in Linton, North Yorkshire
- Listed buildings in Linton-on-Ouse
- Listed buildings in Little Busby
- Listed buildings in Little Langton
- Listed buildings in Little Ouseburn
- Listed buildings in Little Ribston
- Listed buildings in Little Timble
- Listed buildings in Littlethorpe, North Yorkshire
- Listed buildings in Litton, North Yorkshire
- Listed buildings in Lockton
- Listed buildings in Long Marston, North Yorkshire
- Listed buildings in Long Preston
- Listed buildings in Lothersdale
- Listed buildings in Low Abbotside
- Listed buildings in Low Worsall
- Listed buildings in Luttons
- Listed buildings in Lythe
- Listed buildings in Malham
- Listed buildings in Malham Moor
- Listed buildings in Malton, North Yorkshire (central area)
- Listed buildings in Malton, North Yorkshire (outer areas)
- Listed buildings in Manfield
- Listed buildings in Marishes
- Listed buildings in Markenfield Hall
- Listed buildings in Markington with Wallerthwaite
- Listed buildings in Marrick
- Listed buildings in Marske, west North Yorkshire
- Listed buildings in Marton, Ryedale
- Listed buildings in Marton cum Grafton
- Listed buildings in Marton-cum-Moxby
- Listed buildings in Marton-le-Moor
- Listed buildings in Martons Both
- Listed buildings in Masham
- Listed buildings in Maunby
- Listed buildings in Melbecks
- Listed buildings in Melmerby, Harrogate
- Listed buildings in Melmerby in Coverdale
- Listed buildings in Melsonby
- Listed buildings in Middleham
- Listed buildings in Middleton, east North Yorkshire
- Listed buildings in Middleton-on-Wharfe
- Listed buildings in Middleton Quernhow
- Listed buildings in Middleton Tyas
- Listed buildings in Middleton-on-Leven
- Listed buildings in Monk Fryston
- Listed buildings in Moor Monkton
- Listed buildings in Morton-on-Swale
- Listed buildings in Moulton, North Yorkshire
- Listed buildings in Muker
- Listed buildings in Muston, North Yorkshire
- Listed buildings in Myton-on-Swale
- Listed buildings in Nawton, North Yorkshire
- Listed buildings in Nesfield with Langbar
- Listed buildings in Nether Silton
- Listed buildings in New Forest, North Yorkshire
- Listed buildings in Newall with Clifton
- Listed buildings in Newbiggin, south Wensleydale
- Listed buildings in Newburgh, North Yorkshire
- Listed buildings in Newby, Hambleton
- Listed buildings in Newby Wiske
- Listed buildings in Newby and Scalby
- Listed buildings in Newby with Mulwith
- Listed buildings in Newholm-cum-Dunsley
- Listed buildings in Newland, North Yorkshire
- Listed buildings in Newsham, Richmondshire
- Listed buildings in Newsham with Breckenbrough
- Listed buildings in Newton-on-Rawcliffe
- Listed buildings in Newton Kyme cum Toulston
- Listed buildings in Newton Mulgrave
- Listed buildings in Newton-le-Willows, North Yorkshire
- Listed buildings in Newton-on-Ouse
- Listed buildings in Nidd
- Listed buildings in Normanby, Ryedale
- Listed buildings in North Cowton
- Listed buildings in North Deighton
- Listed buildings in North Otterington
- Listed buildings in North Rigton
- Listed buildings in North Stainley with Sleningford
- Listed buildings in Northallerton
- Listed buildings in Norton Conyers
- Listed buildings in Norton-on-Derwent
- Listed buildings in Norwood, North Yorkshire
- Listed buildings in Nun Monkton
- Listed buildings in Nunnington
- Listed buildings in Old Byland and Scawton
- Listed buildings in Oldstead
- Listed buildings in Osmotherley, North Yorkshire
- Listed buildings in Oswaldkirk
- Listed buildings in Otterburn, North Yorkshire
- Listed buildings in Oulston
- Listed buildings in Over Dinsdale
- Listed buildings in Over Silton
- Listed buildings in Overton, North Yorkshire
- Listed buildings in Oxton, North Yorkshire
- Listed buildings in Pannal and Burn Bridge
- Listed buildings in Patrick Brompton
- Listed buildings in Pickering, North Yorkshire
- Listed buildings in Pickhill
- Listed buildings in Plompton
- Listed buildings in Pockley
- Listed buildings in Potto, North Yorkshire
- Listed buildings in Preston-under-Scar
- Listed buildings in Rainton with Newby
- Listed buildings in Raskelf
- Listed buildings in Rathmell
- Listed buildings in Ravensworth
- Listed buildings in Redmire
- Listed buildings in Reeth, Fremington and Healaugh
- Listed buildings in Reighton
- Listed buildings in Riccall
- Listed buildings in Richmond, North Yorkshire
- Listed buildings in Rievaulx
- Listed buildings in Rillington
- Listed buildings in Ripley, North Yorkshire
- Listed buildings in Ripon
- Listed buildings in Roecliffe
- Listed buildings in Romanby
- Listed buildings in Rookwith
- Listed buildings in Rosedale East Side
- Listed buildings in Rosedale West Side
- Listed buildings in Roxby, North Yorkshire
- Listed buildings in Rudby
- Listed buildings in Rylstone
- Listed buildings in Salton, North Yorkshire
- Listed buildings in Sand Hutton
- Listed buildings in Sandhutton
- Listed buildings in Sawley, North Yorkshire
- Listed buildings in Saxton with Scarthingwell
- Listed buildings in Scackleton
- Listed buildings in Scampston
- Listed buildings in Scarborough (Castle Ward)
- Listed buildings in Scarborough (Central Ward)
- Listed buildings in Scarborough (North Bay Ward)
- Listed buildings in Scarborough (Ramshill Ward)
- Listed buildings in Scarborough (Stepney Ward)
- Listed buildings in Scarborough (Weaponness and Falsgrave Park Wards)
- Listed buildings in Scorton, North Yorkshire
- Listed buildings in Scosthrop
- Listed buildings in Scotton, Harrogate
- Listed buildings in Scrayingham
- Listed buildings in Scriven
- Listed buildings in Scruton
- Listed buildings in Seamer, Hambleton
- Listed buildings in Seamer, Scarborough
- Listed buildings in Selby
- Listed buildings in Sessay
- Listed buildings in Settle, North Yorkshire
- Listed buildings in Settrington
- Listed buildings in Sharow
- Listed buildings in Sherburn, North Yorkshire
- Listed buildings in Sherburn in Elmet
- Listed buildings in Sheriff Hutton
- Listed buildings in Shipton, North Yorkshire
- Listed buildings in Sicklinghall
- Listed buildings in Silpho
- Listed buildings in Sinnington
- Listed buildings in Skeeby
- Listed buildings in Skelton-on-Ure
- Listed buildings in Skipton
- Listed buildings in Skipton-on-Swale
- Listed buildings in Skipwith
- Listed buildings in Skutterskelfe
- Listed buildings in Slingsby, North Yorkshire
- Listed buildings in Snainton
- Listed buildings in Snape with Thorp
- Listed buildings in Sneaton
- Listed buildings in South Cowton
- Listed buildings in South Holme
- Listed buildings in South Kilvington
- Listed buildings in South Milford
- Listed buildings in South Otterington
- Listed buildings in South Stainley with Cayton
- Listed buildings in Sowerby, North Yorkshire
- Listed buildings in Spaunton
- Listed buildings in Spennithorne
- Listed buildings in Spofforth with Stockeld
- Listed buildings in Sproxton, North Yorkshire
- Listed buildings in St Martin's, North Yorkshire
- Listed buildings in Stainburn, North Yorkshire
- Listed buildings in Stainforth, North Yorkshire
- Listed buildings in Staintondale
- Listed buildings in Stanwick St John
- Listed buildings in Stape
- Listed buildings in Stapleton, Selby
- Listed buildings in Stapleton-on-Tees
- Listed buildings in Staveley, North Yorkshire
- Listed buildings in Steeton, North Yorkshire
- Listed buildings in Stillingfleet
- Listed buildings in Stillington, North Yorkshire
- Listed buildings in Stirton with Thorlby
- Listed buildings in Stokesley
- Listed buildings in Stonebeck Down
- Listed buildings in Stonebeck Up
- Listed buildings in Stonegrave
- Listed buildings in Studley Roger
- Listed buildings in Stutton with Hazlewood
- Listed buildings in Suffield-cum-Everley
- Listed buildings in Sutton, Craven
- Listed buildings in Sutton-on-the-Forest
- Listed buildings in Sutton-under-Whitestonecliffe
- Listed buildings in Swainby with Allerthorpe
- Listed buildings in Swinton, Ryedale
- Listed buildings in Swinton with Warthermarske
- Listed buildings in Tadcaster
- Listed buildings in Temple Hirst
- Listed buildings in Terrington
- Listed buildings in Theakston, North Yorkshire
- Listed buildings in Thimbleby, North Yorkshire
- Listed buildings in Thirkleby High and Low with Osgodby
- Listed buildings in Thirlby
- Listed buildings in Thirsk
- Listed buildings in Thixendale
- Listed buildings in Thoralby
- Listed buildings in Thorganby, North Yorkshire
- Listed buildings in Thormanby
- Listed buildings in Thornthwaite with Padside
- Listed buildings in Thornton Rust
- Listed buildings in Thornton Steward
- Listed buildings in Thornton Watlass
- Listed buildings in Thornton in Craven
- Listed buildings in Thornton in Lonsdale
- Listed buildings in Thornton-le-Beans
- Listed buildings in Thornton-le-Dale
- Listed buildings in Thornton-le-Moor
- Listed buildings in Thornton-le-Street
- Listed buildings in Thornville, North Yorkshire
- Listed buildings in Thorpe, North Yorkshire
- Listed buildings in Thorpe Bassett
- Listed buildings in Thorpe Underwoods
- Listed buildings in Thorpe Willoughby
- Listed buildings in Threshfield
- Listed buildings in Thruscross
- Listed buildings in Tockwith
- Listed buildings in Tollerton, North Yorkshire
- Listed buildings in Topcliffe, North Yorkshire
- Listed buildings in Towton
- Listed buildings in Tunstall, North Yorkshire
- Listed buildings in Uckerby
- Listed buildings in Ugthorpe
- Listed buildings in Ulleskelf
- Listed buildings in Upper Helmsley
- Listed buildings in Upsall
- Listed buildings in Walburn, North Yorkshire
- Listed buildings in Walden Stubbs
- Listed buildings in Warlaby
- Listed buildings in Warthill
- Listed buildings in Wath (near Ripon)
- Listed buildings in Weaverthorpe
- Listed buildings in Weeton, North Yorkshire
- Listed buildings in Welburn-on-Derwent
- Listed buildings in Welburn, Kirkbymoorside
- Listed buildings in Welbury
- Listed buildings in Well, North Yorkshire
- Listed buildings in Wensley, North Yorkshire
- Listed buildings in West Ayton
- Listed buildings in West Harlsey
- Listed buildings in West Hauxwell
- Listed buildings in West Rounton
- Listed buildings in West Scrafton
- Listed buildings in West Tanfield
- Listed buildings in West Witton
- Listed buildings in Westerdale
- Listed buildings in Weston, North Yorkshire
- Listed buildings in Westow
- Listed buildings in Wharram
- Listed buildings in Whashton
- Listed buildings in Whenby
- Listed buildings in Whitby (central area - east)
- Listed buildings in Whitby (central area - west)
- Listed buildings in Whitby (outer areas)
- Listed buildings in Whitwell-on-the-Hill
- Listed buildings in Whixley
- Listed buildings in Whorlton, North Yorkshire
- Listed buildings in Wigglesworth
- Listed buildings in Wighill
- Listed buildings in Willerby, North Yorkshire
- Listed buildings in Wilton, Ryedale
- Listed buildings in Winksley
- Listed buildings in Winton, Stank and Hallikeld
- Listed buildings in Wintringham, North Yorkshire
- Listed buildings in Wistow, North Yorkshire
- Listed buildings in Wombleton
- Listed buildings in Womersley
- Listed buildings in Wrelton
- Listed buildings in Wykeham, Scarborough
- Listed buildings in Yafforth
- Listed buildings in Yearsley
- Listed buildings in York (Acomb Ward)
- Listed buildings in York (within the city walls, northern part)
- Listed buildings in York (within the city walls, southern part)
- Listed buildings in York (outside the city walls, northern part)
- Listed buildings in York (outside the city walls, southern part)
- Listed buildings in Youlton
