= Listed buildings in Scarborough, North Yorkshire =

There are over 280 listed buildings in the town of Scarborough, North Yorkshire that are recorded in the National Heritage List for England. These are included in the following lists, divided by ward.

- Listed buildings in Scarborough (Castle Ward)
- Listed buildings in Scarborough (Central Ward)
- Listed buildings in Scarborough (North Bay Ward)
- Listed buildings in Scarborough (Ramshill Ward)
- Listed buildings in Scarborough (Stepney Ward)
- Listed buildings in Scarborough (Weaponness and Falsgrave Park Wards)
