= Barugh =

Barugh may refer to:

- Barugh, South Yorkshire
- Barugh (Great and Little), parish in North Yorkshire
