= Scosthrop =

Civil parish in North Yorkshire, England

Coordinates: 54.031°N 2.152°W

- Civil parish
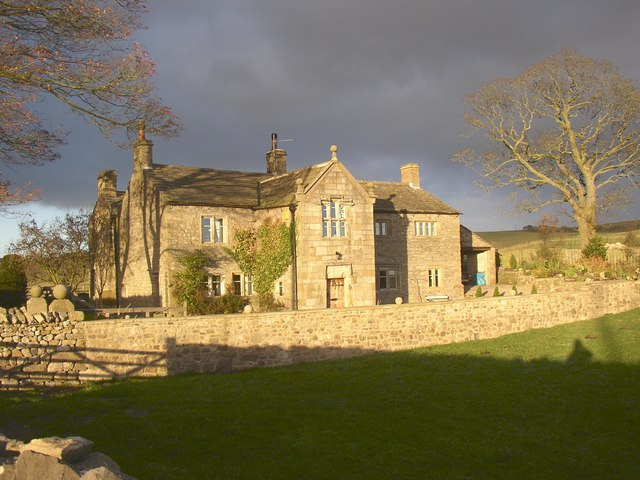
- Scosthrop Manor
- OS grid reference: SD900594
- Civil parish: Scosthrop
- Unitary authority: North Yorkshire
- Ceremonial county: North Yorkshire
- Region: Yorkshire and the Humber
- Country: England
- Sovereign state: United Kingdom
- Post town: SKIPTON
- Postcode district: BD23
- Police: North Yorkshire
- Fire: North Yorkshire
- Ambulance: Yorkshire
- UK Parliament: Skipton and Ripon

Scosthrop is a civil parish in North Yorkshire, England. The population as taken at the 2011 Census was less than 100. Details are included in the civil parish of Kirkby Malham. In 2015, North Yorkshire County Council estimated the settlement to have approximately 70 people.

Scosthorp was mentioned in the Domesday Book as belonging to William the Conqueror, and the name means from Skott's outlying farmstead, with Skott being a personal name from Old Norse.

Until 1974 it was part of the West Riding of Yorkshire. From 1974 to 2023 it was part of the Craven District, it is now administered by the unitary North Yorkshire Council.

== See also ==
- Listed buildings in Scosthrop
