= Newton Mulgrave =

Village and civil parish in North Yorkshire, England

Coordinates: 54.529200°N 0.783300°W

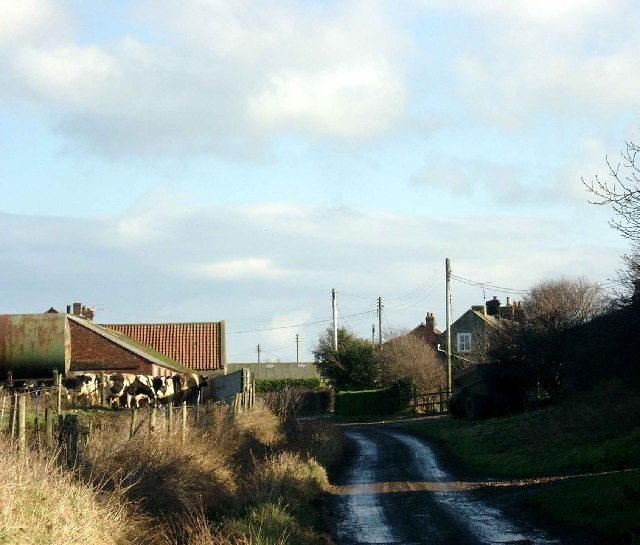

- Location within North Yorkshire
- Population: 40 (2014)
- OS grid reference: NZ788155
- Civil parish: Newton Mulgrave
- Unitary authority: North Yorkshire
- Ceremonial county: North Yorkshire
- Region: Yorkshire and the Humber
- Country: England
- Sovereign state: United Kingdom
- Post town: SALTBURN-BY-THE-SEA
- Postcode district: TS13
- Police: North Yorkshire
- Fire: North Yorkshire
- Ambulance: Yorkshire
- UK Parliament: Scarborough and Whitby

Newton Mulgrave is a village and civil parish in the county of North Yorkshire, England.

The population of the civil parish was estimated at 40 in 2014. According to the 2001 UK census, Newton Mulgrave parish had a population of 37.

From 1974 to 2023 it was part of the Borough of Scarborough, it is now administered by the unitary North Yorkshire Council.

== See also ==
- Listed buildings in Newton Mulgrave
