= Hutton Mulgrave =

Village and civil parish in North Yorkshire, England

Coordinates: 54.478303°N 0.711693°W

- Location within North Yorkshire
- Population: 48 (2001 census)
- OS grid reference: NZ835099
- Civil parish: Hutton Mulgrave
- Unitary authority: North Yorkshire
- Ceremonial county: North Yorkshire
- Region: Yorkshire and the Humber
- Country: England
- Sovereign state: United Kingdom
- Post town: WHITBY
- Postcode district: YO21
- Police: North Yorkshire
- Fire: North Yorkshire
- Ambulance: Yorkshire
- UK Parliament: Scarborough and Whitby

Hutton Mulgrave is a village and civil parish in the county of North Yorkshire, England.

According to the 2001 UK census, Hutton Mulgrave parish had a population of 48. The population remained at less than 100 as at the 2011 Census. Details are included in the civil parish of Ugthorpe.

From 1974 to 2023 it was part of the Borough of Scarborough, it is now administered by the unitary North Yorkshire Council.

== See also ==
- Listed buildings in Hutton Mulgrave

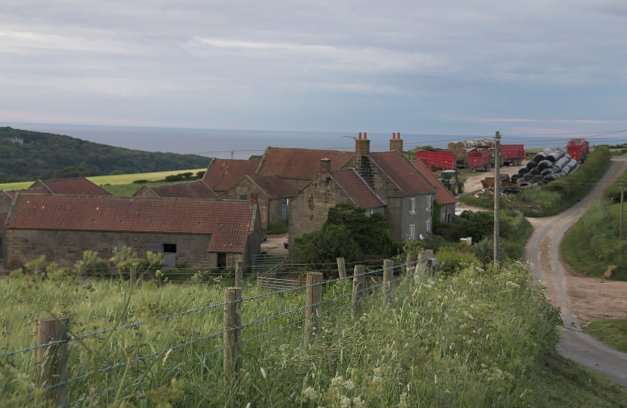
Low Farm, Hutton Mulgrave
