= Ellenthorpe =

Civil parish in North Yorkshire, England

Coordinates: 54.10088°N 1.35852°W

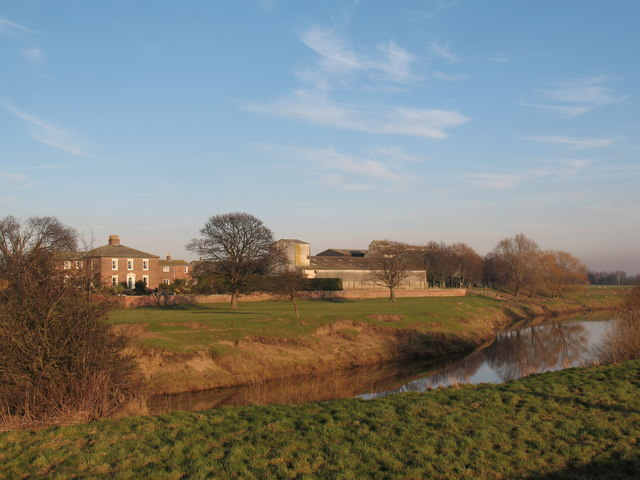
- Ellenthorpe Hall seen from across the Ure River

- Location within North Yorkshire
- Population: 34 (2001 census)
- Unitary authority: North Yorkshire
- Ceremonial county: North Yorkshire
- Region: Yorkshire and the Humber
- Country: England
- Sovereign state: United Kingdom
- Post town: YORK
- Postcode district: YO51
- Police: North Yorkshire
- Fire: North Yorkshire
- Ambulance: Yorkshire
- UK Parliament: Skipton and Ripon

Ellenthorpe is a civil parish in the county of North Yorkshire, England. In 2001, the civil parish had 34 inhabitants. It was mentioned in the Domesday Book (1086) as Adelingestorp.

The River Ure lies to the west of Ellenthorpe, with Ellenthorpe Hall located on the bank of the river, facing Aldborough.

From 1974 to 2023 it was part of the Borough of Harrogate. It is now administered by the unitary North Yorkshire Council.

== See also ==
- Listed buildings in Ellenthorpe
