= Church of St Columba, Scarborough =

Coordinates: 54°17′09″N 0°24′37″W

St Columba's Church, Scarborough
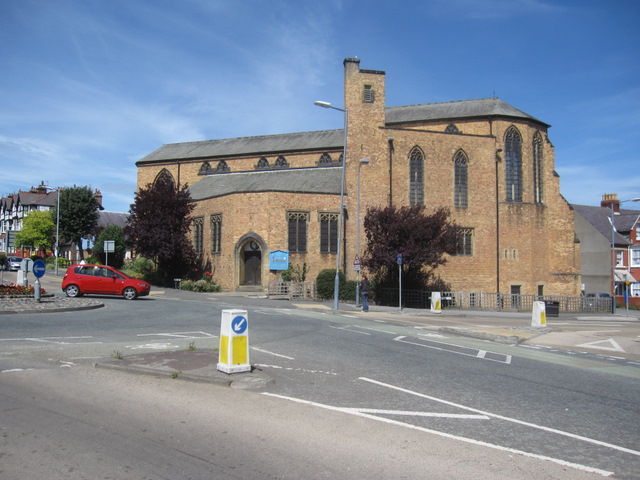
- St Columba's Church, Scarborough
- OS grid reference: TA 03592 88969
- Country: England
- Denomination: Church of England
- Website: Official website

History
- Consecrated: 1926

Architecture
- Architect: Temple Moore

Administration
- Diocese: Diocese of York
- Archdeaconry: Archdeaconry of the East Riding
- Parish: St. Columba Scarborough

Clergy
- Vicar: interregnum

The Church of St Columba is a Church of England parish church in Scarborough, North Yorkshire. The church was designed by the architect Temple Moore (1856–1920), but was built from 1924 to 1926 by his son-in-law Leslie Thomas Moore. It is a grade II* listed building.

The church stands on an irregularly shaped plot, and the buildings has been built to this. The chancel is located in the north-east corner rather than the usual liturgical east. It has a triangular lady chapel. The floor plan of the church has been described as bird-like.

As of 2024, St Columba's is united with St James with Holy Trinity Church, Scarborough as the benefice of Scarborough Saint Columba and Saint James with Holy Trinity. The parish is in the Archdeaconry of The East Riding of the Diocese of York.

== See also ==
- Grade II* listed churches in North Yorkshire (district)
- Listed buildings in Scarborough (Central Ward)

== Gallery ==
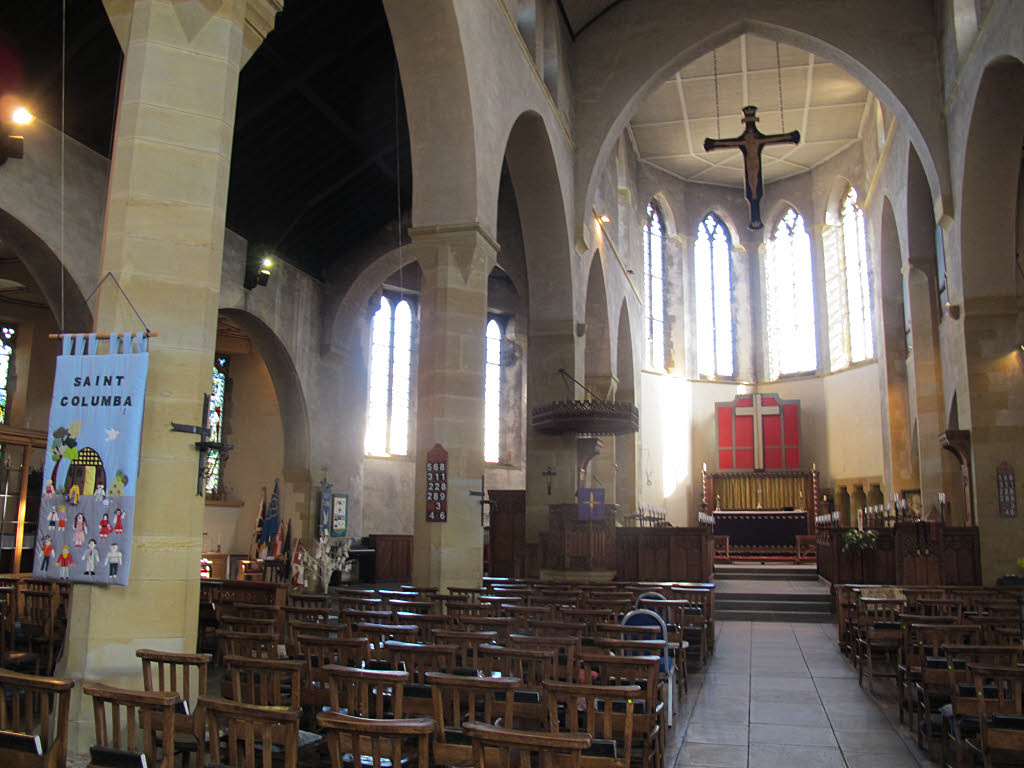
Nave and chancel

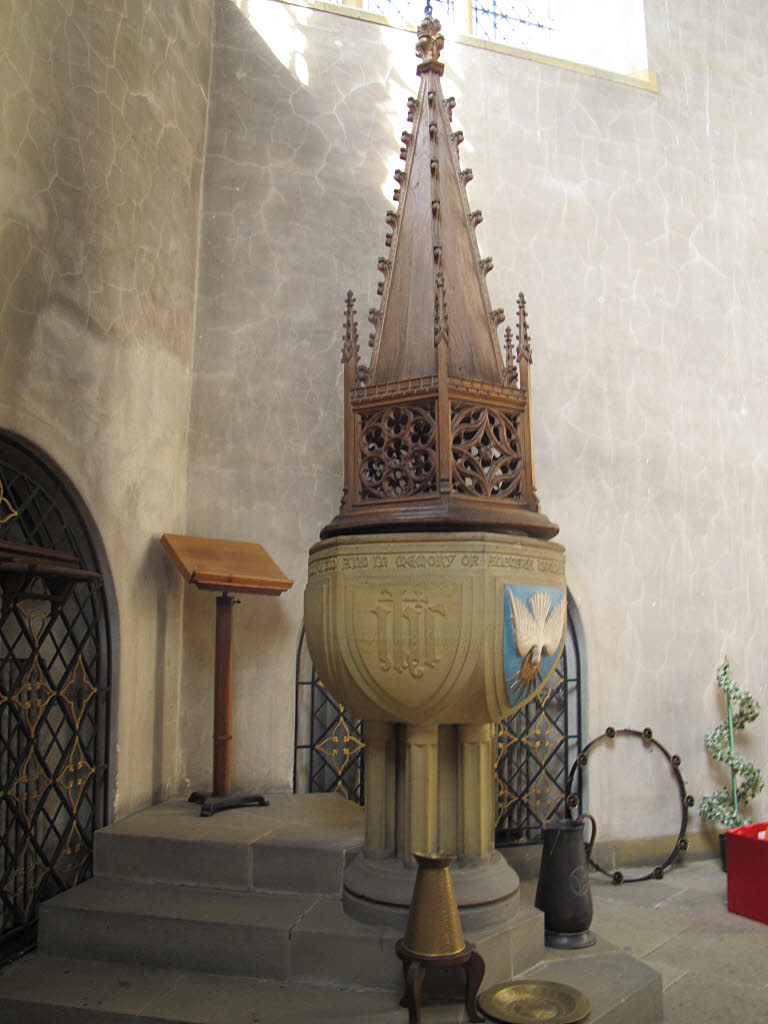
Font

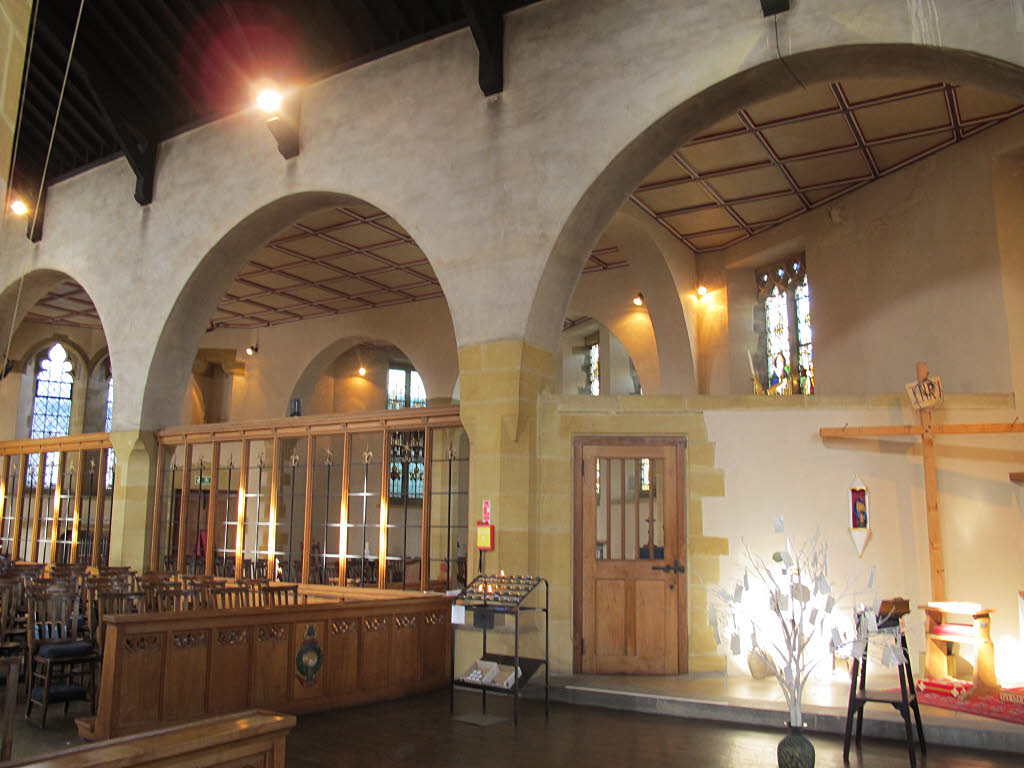
Side aisle showing the irregular shape of the building
