= Hartoft =

Civil parish in North Yorkshire, England

Coordinates: 54.3534°N 0.8421°W

- Location within North Yorkshire
- Population: 50
- OS grid reference: SE 754 959
- Civil parish: Hartoft
- Unitary authority: North Yorkshire
- Ceremonial county: North Yorkshire
- Region: Yorkshire and the Humber
- Country: England
- Sovereign state: United Kingdom
- Post town: PICKERING
- Postcode district: YO18
- Dialling code: 01751
- Police: North Yorkshire
- Fire: North Yorkshire
- Ambulance: Yorkshire
- UK Parliament: Thirsk and Malton

Hartoft is a hamlet in the county of North Yorkshire, England. It is situated approximately 7 miles (11 km) north-northwest from Pickering. The nearest village, Rosedale Abbey, is situated 1.8 miles (3 km) away.

It was part of the Ryedale district between 1974 and 2023. It is now administered by North Yorkshire Council.

== See also ==
- Listed buildings in Hartoft
Gallery
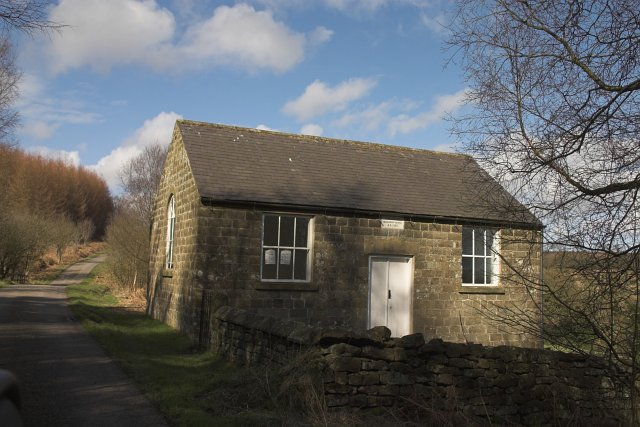
Methodist Chapel

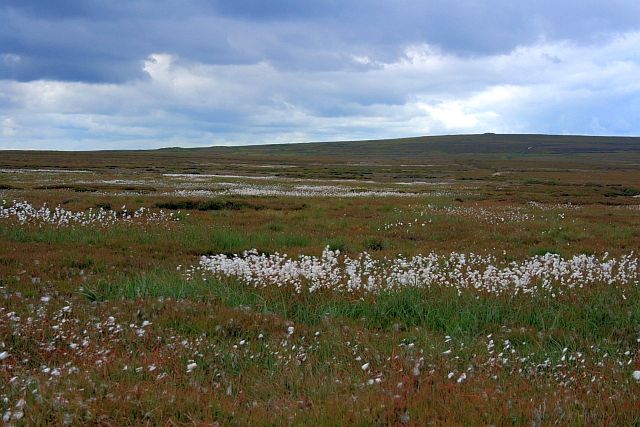
White Moor

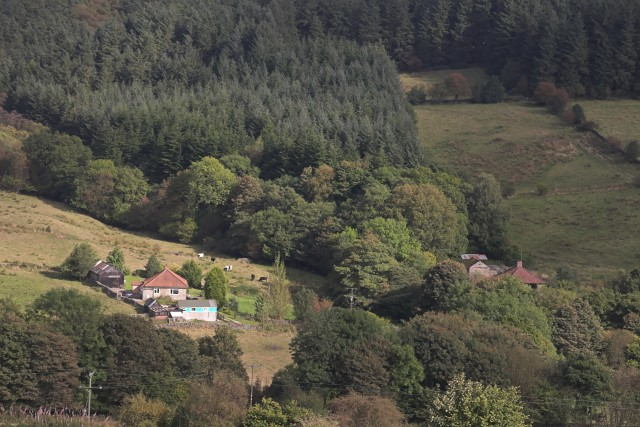
Low Muffles
