= Scarborough Borough Jail =

Building in Scarborough, North Yorkshire, England

Coordinates: 54°17′08″N 0°24′32″W

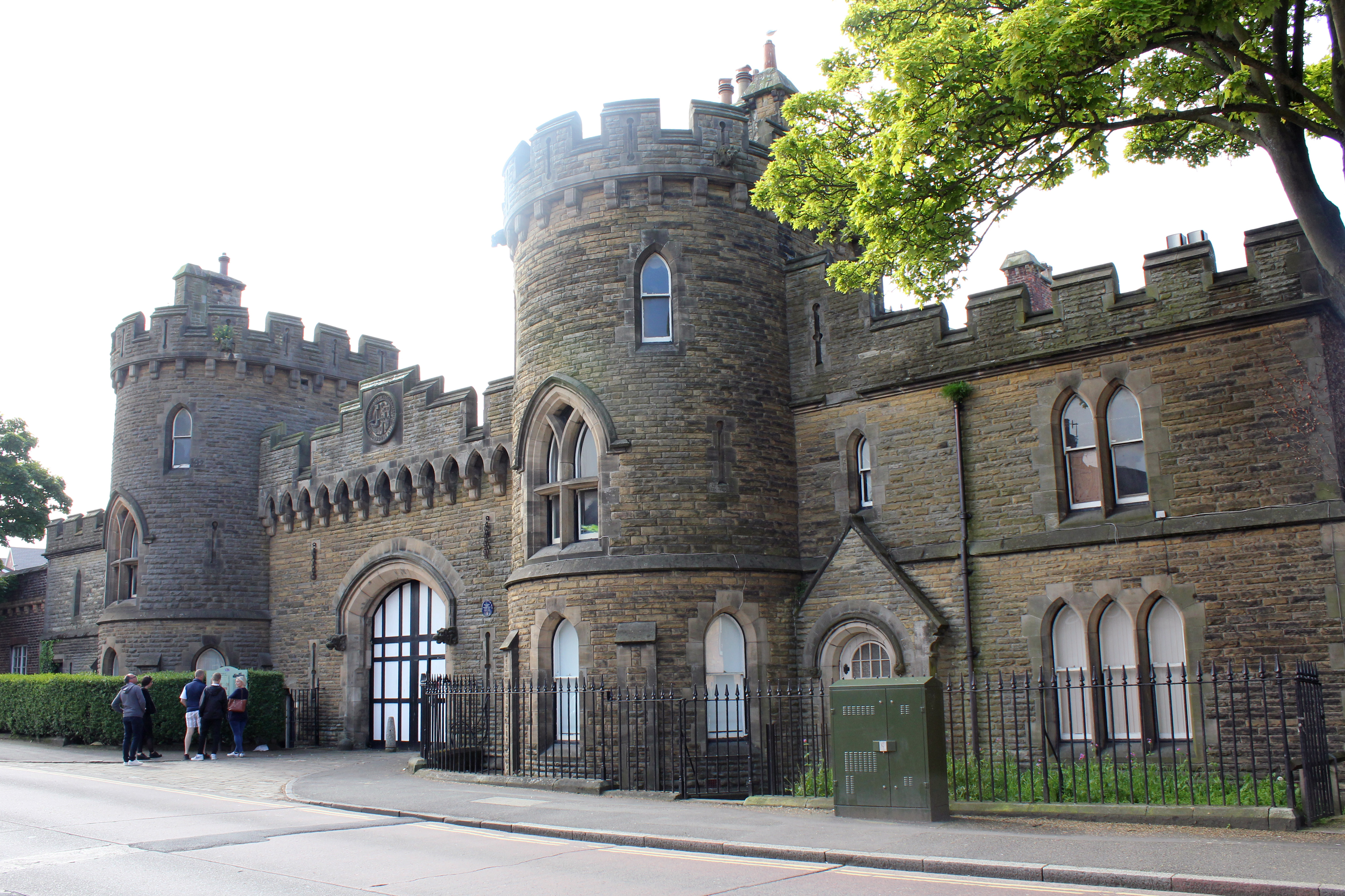
The building, in 2021

Scarborough Borough Jail is a historic building in Scarborough, North Yorkshire, a town in England.

The jail in Scarborough was historically at Newborough Gate in the Town Wall, and in the 19th century there were also cells in the workhouse on Dean Road. Between 1865 and 1866, the corporation built a new prison on Dean Road, to a design by William Baldwin Stewart and Alexander Taylor, at a cost of £12,000. It initially had a capacity of 36 men, 12 women and four debtors. On opening, 44 prisoners transferred in, and the capacity was soon increased to 79. One prison escaped in the first week, using an improvised rope to scale the wall. In 1878, the UK Government made new arrangements for prison provision, and the Scarborough Borough Jail was closed. More recently, the building has served as a council depot, with plans to convert it into a hotel not taken forward. The building has been grade II listed since 1985.

The building has a perimeter wall of stone faced brick, elsewhere it is in brick, and has a slate roof. At the entrance is an embattled machicolated elliptical arch flanked by arrow slits, and with a carved plaque above. Outside the entrance are three-storey towers with embattled parapets, containing windows with pointed heads, flanked by walls ending in smaller towers. Inside, one cell block remains, with three storeys and fronts of three and ten bays. There is also a hexagonal guards' room, two single-storey blocks of workshops, and two rectangular stone houses.

== See also ==
- Listed buildings in Scarborough (North Bay Ward)
