= Scosthrop Manor =

Building in Scosthrop, North Yorkshire, England

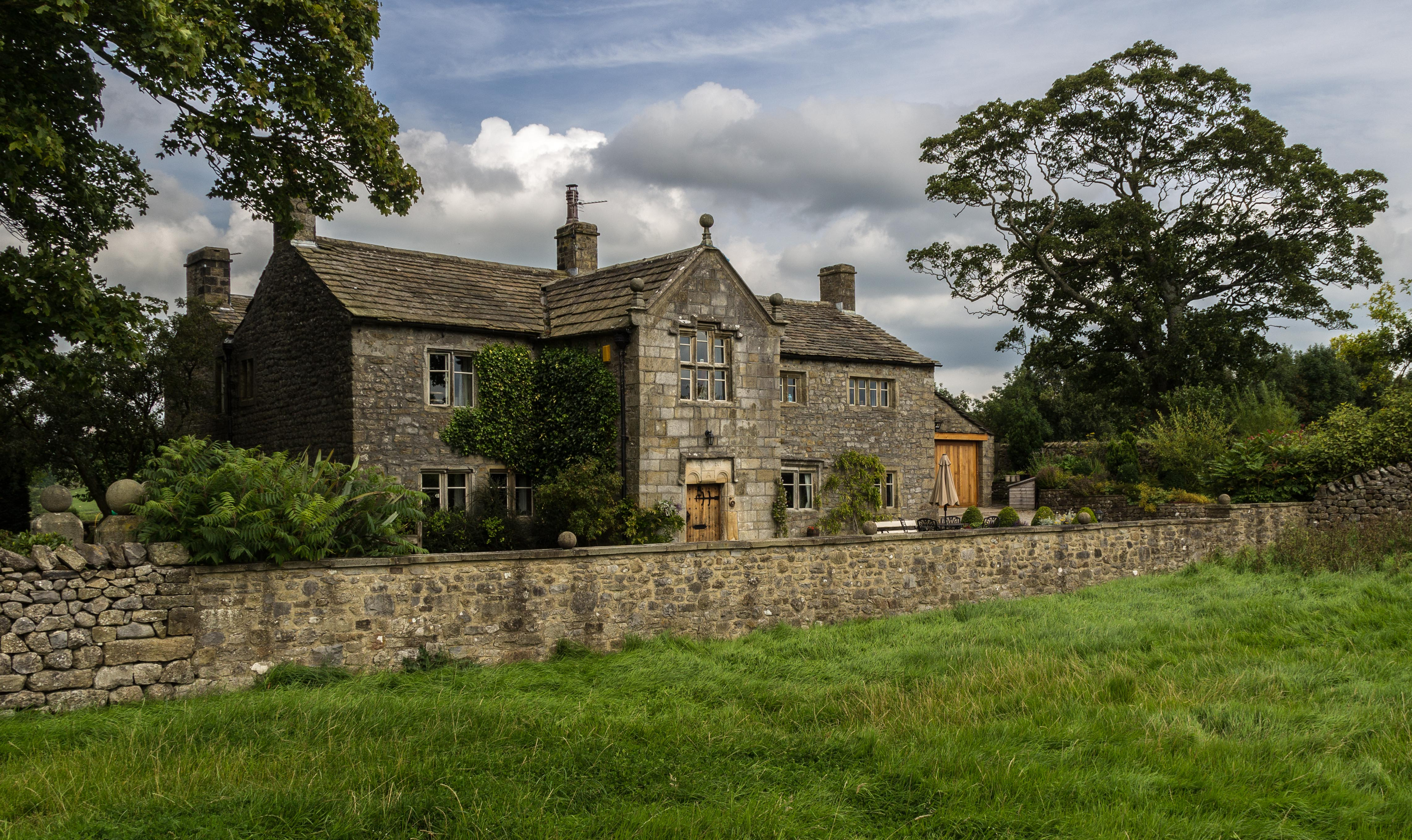
The building, in 2016

Scosthrop Manor is a historic building in Scosthrop, a building in North Yorkshire, in England.

The manor house was built in 1603, with the porch added in 1686. It was restored by Miss Garnett-Orme in 1905, and was grade II listed in 1958. In 1971, the Hall family purchased the house and gradually restored it. In 2017, it was marketed for sale for £975,000, at which time it had six bedrooms, a reception hall, living/dining room, kitchen, sitting room, butler's pantry, and cloakroom. The garden had a ha-ha with views to Malham Cove.

The house is built of stone, with a stone slate roof, two storeys and five bays. On the front is a two-storey porch with a coped gable, shaped kneelers, and ball finials. The doorway has moulded jambs, over which is an initialled datestone and a hood mould, and above is a stepped mullioned and transomed window. Elsewhere, the windows are mullioned with casements.

== See also ==
- Listed buildings in Scosthrop
