= Newland, North Yorkshire =

Hamlet and civil parish in North Yorkshire, England

Coordinates: 53.7135°N 0.9492°W

Newland
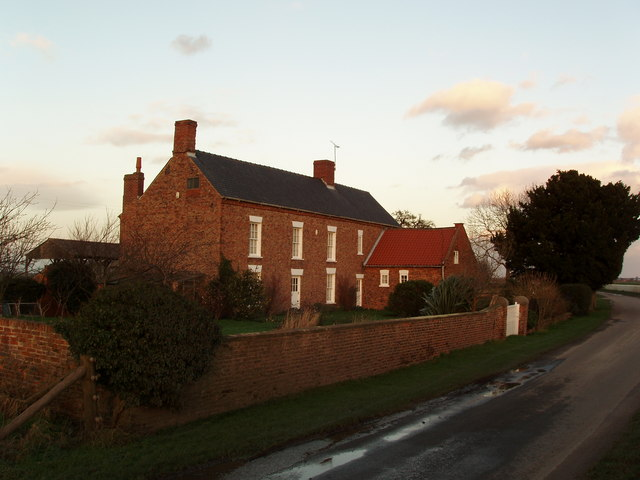
- Newland Hall

- Location within North Yorkshire
- Population: 202 (2011 census)
- OS grid reference: SE694246
- Civil parish: Newland
- Unitary authority: North Yorkshire
- Ceremonial county: North Yorkshire
- Region: Yorkshire and the Humber
- Country: England
- Sovereign state: United Kingdom
- Post town: SELBY
- Postcode district: YO8
- Dialling code: 01757
- Police: North Yorkshire
- Fire: North Yorkshire
- Ambulance: Yorkshire
- UK Parliament: Selby

Newland is a hamlet and civil parish in the county of North Yorkshire, England. According to the 2011 UK census Newland parish had a population of 202, an increase on the 2001 UK census figure of 198.

Until 1974 it was part of the West Riding of Yorkshire. From 1974 to 2023 it was part of the Selby District, it is now administered by the unitary North Yorkshire Council.

== See also ==
- Listed buildings in Newland, North Yorkshire
