= Holy Trinity Church, Rathmell =

Church in Rathmell, North Yorkshire, England

Coordinates: 54°02′06″N 2°18′00″W

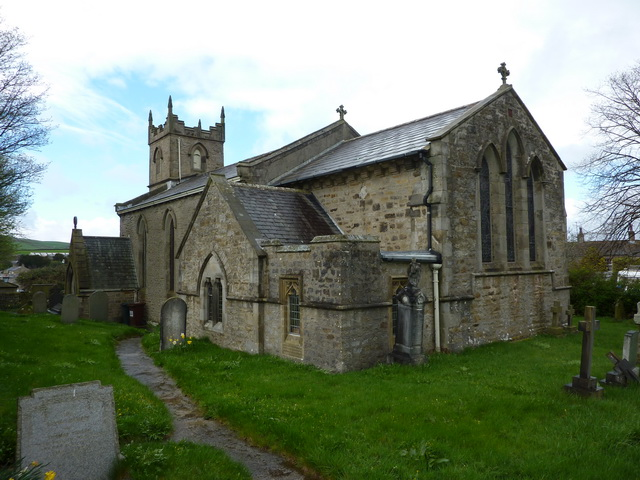
The church, in 2011

Holy Trinity Church is the parish church of Rathmell, a village in North Yorkshire, in England.

Until the mid-19th century, Rathmell fell within the parish of St Alkelda's Church, Giggleswick. In the early 19th century, ministers often preached in the school at Rathmell, and in 1842 a church was built in the village. It was the smallest church in the Diocese of Ripon, with seating for 121 worshippers. In 1883 a chancel and vestry were added, to a design by Francis Healey, followed in 1897 by a porch, then in 1912 the vestry was extended. The building was grade II listed in 1987.

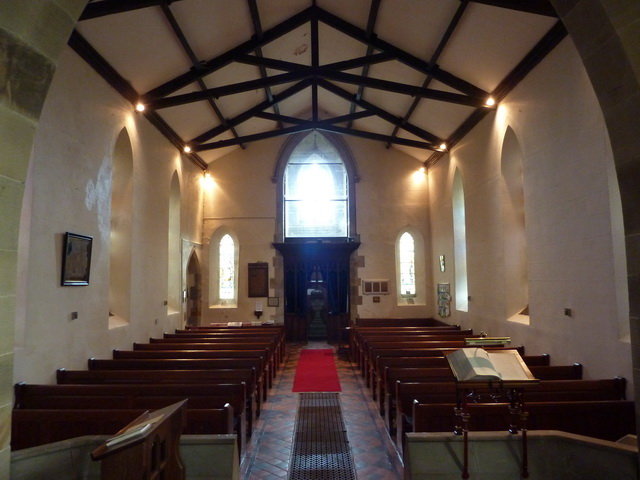
Interior, looking west

The church is built of stone with millstone grit dressings and a Westmorland slate roof. It consists of a nave, a south porch, a chancel and a south vestry, and a west tower. The tower has three stages, a blocked west entrance with a segmental pointed arch and a hood mould, string courses, a two-light window with Y-tracery, a clock face, bell openings with hood moulds, and an embattled parapet with finials. Most of the windows in the body of the church are lancets, and some have stained glass by Jean-Baptiste Capronnier, installed in 1870. Inside, there is a piscina, two sedilia, and an oak reredos installed in 1908.

== See also ==
- Listed buildings in Rathmell
