= Scarborough Windmill =

Windmill in Scarborough, North Yorkshire, England

Coordinates: 54°16′48″N 0°24′37″W

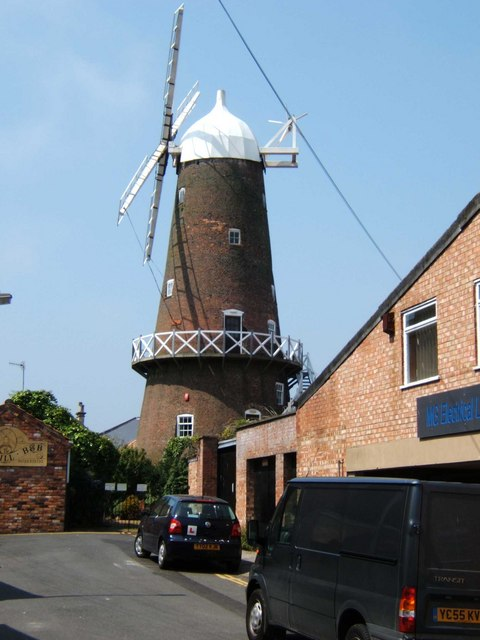
The building, in 2006

Scarborough Windmill, also known as Victoria Mill, is a historic building in Scarborough, North Yorkshire, a town in England.

The windmill was built in about 1785 by Thomas Robinson. It was built on land owned by Scarborough Corporation and was originally known as the "Common Mill". The corn mill changed hands regularly before being purchased by Francis and Moses Harrison in about 1850. The brothers ran a business selling both corn and seeds. The mill originally had six sails, but these were badly damaged in a storm in 1880, one falling and killing a cow, and after repair it had only four sails. These were removed in 1898 and the mill was then powered by an engine. The mill closed in 1927 and was disused for many years before in 1988 being converted into part of a hotel. In 1997, it became self-catering accommodation, and in 1999, the sails and cap were replaced.

The windmill is built of brick on a stone plinth. It is tapering, and has a circular plan and six storeys. Steps lead up to the doorway that has a segmental brick arch. There is another higher doorway, and the other openings are rectangular and decreasing in size towards the top. Inside, there are two apartments, each over two floors. Both have a combined lounge and kitchen area, and an en suite bedroom. The building has been grade II listed since 1987.

== See also ==
- Listed buildings in Scarborough (Central Ward)
