= Landmoth-cum-Catto =

Civil parish in North Yorkshire, England

Coordinates: 54.3245°N 1.3436°W

- Civil parish
- OS grid reference: SE427922
- Civil parish: Landmoth-cum-Catto
- Unitary authority: North Yorkshire
- Ceremonial county: North Yorkshire
- Region: Yorkshire and the Humber
- Country: England
- Sovereign state: United Kingdom
- Post town: NORTHALLERTON
- Postcode district: DL6
- Police: North Yorkshire
- Fire: North Yorkshire
- Ambulance: Yorkshire

Landmoth-cum-Catto is a civil parish in the county of North Yorkshire, England. From 1974 to 2023 it was part of the Hambleton District, it is now administered by the unitary North Yorkshire Council.

The parish has two Grade II listed buildings – Marigold Hall and Catto Hall.

== See also ==
- Listed buildings in Landmoth-cum-Catto
