= Stape =

Hamlet and civil parish in North Yorkshire, England

Coordinates: 54.328400°N 0.781900°W

- Location within North Yorkshire
- Population: 120 (2015 – estimated)
- OS grid reference: SE793932
- Civil parish: Stape
- Unitary authority: North Yorkshire
- Ceremonial county: North Yorkshire
- Region: Yorkshire and the Humber
- Country: England
- Sovereign state: United Kingdom
- Post town: PICKERING
- Postcode district: YO18
- Police: North Yorkshire
- Fire: North Yorkshire
- Ambulance: Yorkshire
- UK Parliament: Thirsk and Malton

Stape is a hamlet and civil parish in North Yorkshire, England. At the 2011 Census the population was less than 100; details are included in the civil parish of Cropton. The population was estimated to be 120 in 2015 by the local authority.

Stape is in the North York Moors National Park, 8 miles (13 km) north of Pickering. From 1974 to 2023 it was part of the district of Ryedale, it is now administered by the unitary North Yorkshire Council.

To the south-west of the village, a Roman Road runs across Flamborough Rigg, through the village and across the moors to the north. It is thought that the road is Wade's Causeway, which connected the Roman camps at Malton and Cawthorne with the east coast.

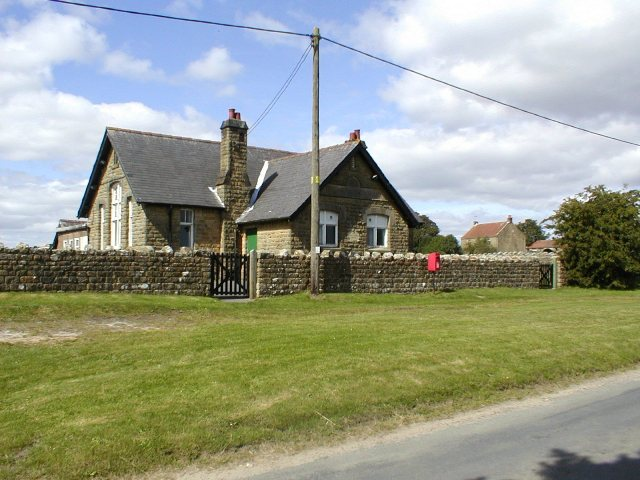
The Ken Ather Outdoor Centre, Stape, formerly a school

Also to the south west is the Keldy Castle estate, which was requisitioned from the Reckitt Family during the Second World War as an army camp. The castle (actually a stately home with crenellated walls) was destroyed in 1950 after being declared surplus to the requirements of the owners. In 1976, the Forestry Commission installed holiday homes on the site.

There was an activity centre, known as the Ken Ather Outdoor Centre, built for use by pupils of the village until closed by what was then the North Riding Education Authority. It was run by the Joseph Rowntree Trust and often used by Joseph Rowntree School, New Earswick, York until 2016, when administrative problems made it too difficult to retain.

Stape was formerly home to the Stape Silver Band, which was formed in Newtondale in 1884. The band have been featured in the ITV series Heartbeat twice in 1994 and 2008. In 2010, the band reached the finals of the National Brass Band Competition which was held in Harrogate. The band are now based in Pickering.

== See also ==
- Listed buildings in Stape
