= Langthorne =

Village and civil parish in North Yorkshire, England

Coordinates: 54.31878°N 1.61464°W

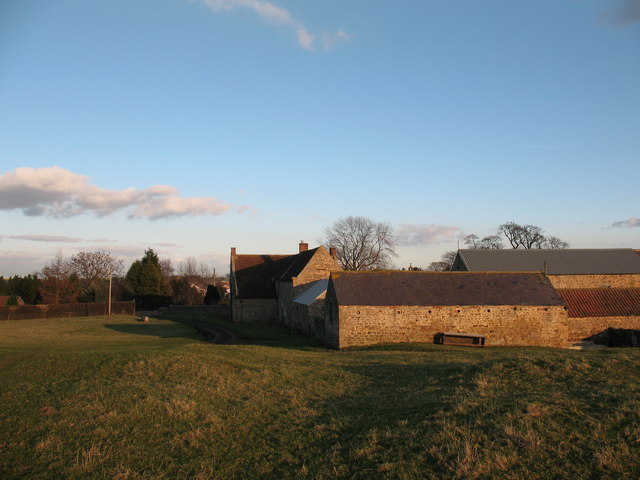
- West Farm, by Langthorne

- Location within North Yorkshire
- Population: 60
- OS grid reference: SE251915
- Unitary authority: North Yorkshire
- Ceremonial county: North Yorkshire
- Region: Yorkshire and the Humber
- Country: England
- Sovereign state: United Kingdom
- Post town: Bedale
- Postcode district: DL8
- Police: North Yorkshire
- Fire: North Yorkshire
- Ambulance: Yorkshire

Langthorne is a village and civil parish in the county of North Yorkshire, England. Like many settlements in the area during the time of the Domesday Book, the land belonged to Count Alan and had just three villagers registered as living there. The name of the village means Tall Thorn-Bush (or tree) and derives from the Old English Lang and þorn.

From 1974 to 2023 it was part of the Hambleton District, it is now administered by the unitary North Yorkshire Council.

The population was estimated to be 60 in 2015. It is near Hackforth and the A1(M) motorway 2 miles (3.2 km) north of Bedale.

The hamlet used to have two places of worship; the Anglican church was dedicated to St Mary, and the other religious house was a Wesleyan Methodist chapel. Both buildings are now private dwellings.

"A Brief and Recent History of Langthorne" was published in May 2021 following a community project. It is also available online at www.langthornevillage.com

== See also ==
- Listed buildings in Langthorne
