= Balk, North Yorkshire =

Hamlet and civil parish in North Yorkshire, England

Coordinates: 54.2222°N 1.26931°W

Balk
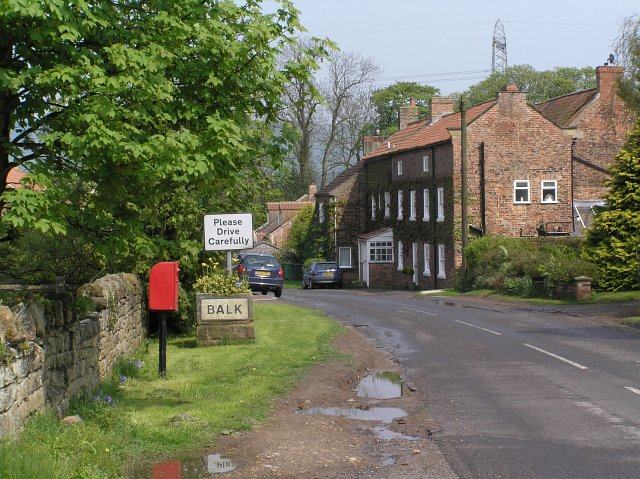
- The western approach to Balk village

- Location within North Yorkshire
- Population: 60
- OS grid reference: SE477809
- Civil parish: Bagby and Balk
- Unitary authority: North Yorkshire
- Ceremonial county: North Yorkshire
- Region: Yorkshire and the Humber
- Country: England
- Sovereign state: United Kingdom
- Post town: Thirsk
- Postcode district: YO7
- Police: North Yorkshire
- Fire: North Yorkshire
- Ambulance: Yorkshire

Balk is a hamlet and civil parish in the county of North Yorkshire, England, just east of Thirsk. In the 2001 census the parish had a population of 48. The population of the parish was estimated at 60 in 2013. The parish shares a grouped parish council with the adjacent parish of Bagby.

From 1974 to 2023 it was part of the Hambleton District, it is now administered by the unitary North Yorkshire Council.

The moated grange at grid reference SE47718083 is a scheduled ancient monument.

== See also ==
- Listed buildings in Balk, North Yorkshire
