= Timble Inn =

Pub in Great Timble, North Yorkshire, England

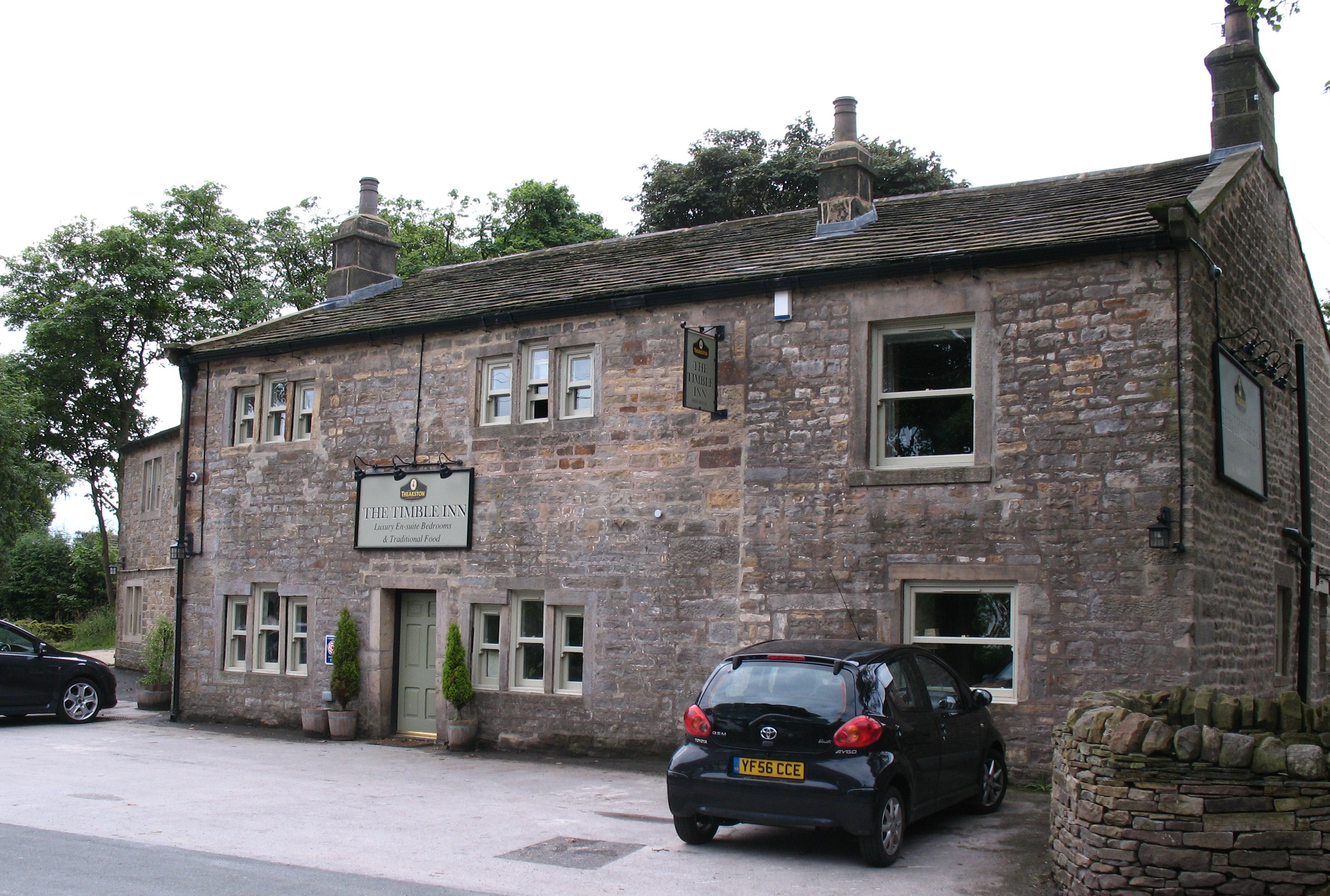
The pub, in 2010

The Timble Inn is a historic pub in Great Timble, a village in North Yorkshire, in England.

The building was constructed in the late 18th century as a house. Part was soon converted into an inn. It was refurbished between 2005 and 2010, to provide nine bedrooms and a restaurant, in addition to the bar. The Daily Telegraph describes it as a "gastropub", with "stone-flagged floors, beams and deep windows". The building was grade II listed in 1987.

The pub is built of gritstone, with quoins, and a stone slate roof with a shaped kneeler and coping on the left. There are two storeys, two bays, and an added bay on the right. In the centre of the original block is a doorway with tie-stone jambs, and the windows are mullioned with three stepped lights. The right bay contains a blocked doorway and sash windows.

== See also ==
- Listed buildings in Great Timble
