= Cappleside Barn =

Building in North Yorkshire, England

Coordinates: 54°01′42″N 2°18′01″W

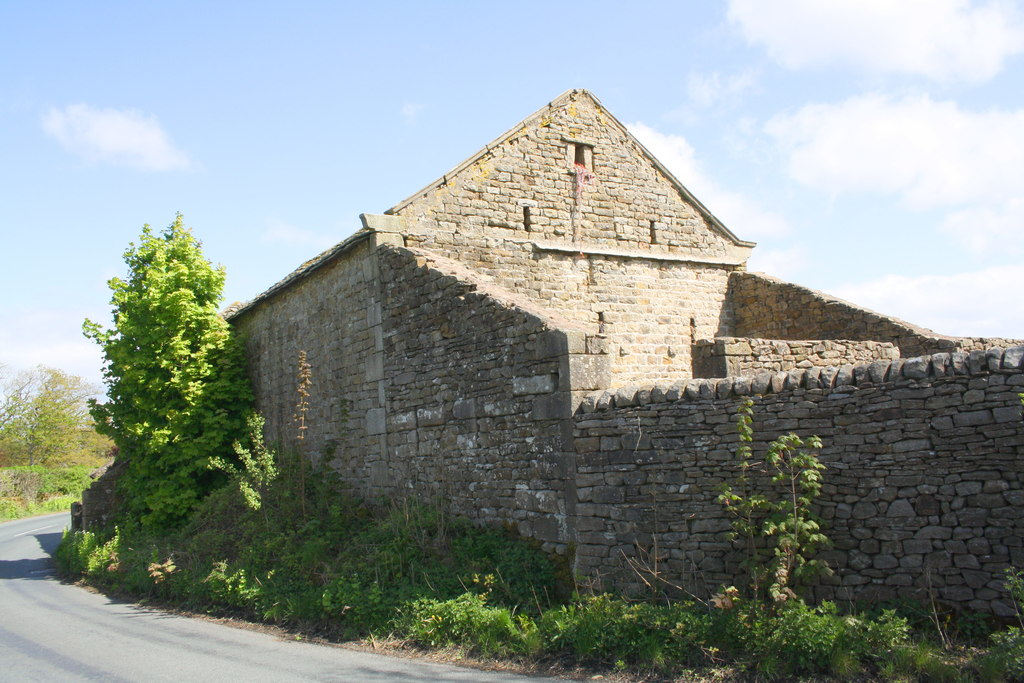
The building, in 2019

Cappleside Barn, also known as Brocklands Barn, is a historic building near Rathmell, a village in North Yorkshire, in England.

The Cappleside estate was owned by the Nowell family from 1624, and the barn was constructed in 1714, possibly by Henry Nowell. Although it has been speculated that some of the roof timber may be reused from an earlier structure, tree ring analysis conducted in 2017 and 2018 found multiple timbers felled in the 1710s and none with earlier dates. Historic England describes it as "clearly a building of high status", with a "remarkable ornamental roof structure" and a "cutting-edge design for its time". It incorporates housing for cattle, allowing more cows to be kept over winter, and the walls lean slightly out, to shed water more readily. In about 1800, lean-to extensions were added to the south and east, to provide more accommodation for cows, and a further one was added in the late 19th century to the southeast corner. Around this time, a hay house was added to the north of the barn, and it was heightened in the 20th century. The barn was grade II* listed in 2018, but in 2019 was added to the Heritage at Risk Register as the roof and walls needed repairs to keep the building watertight.

The barn is built of sandstone on a plinth, with quoins, and a roof of sandstone flags with moulded gable coping and shaped kneelers. There are six bays, porches and lean-tos. The openings include doorways with quoined surrounds, cart entrances, one with segmental arch of voussoirs, windows, slit vents, and owl holes in the gables. On the barn is an initialled datestone. The roof trusses have elaborate collars, and carvings including a daisy wheel, which were probably intended to ward off evil spirits. This decorative style is specific to the Craven area in the early 18th century.

== See also ==
- Grade II* listed buildings in North Yorkshire (district)
- Listed buildings in Rathmell
