= Listed buildings in Stape =

Stape is a civil parish in the county of North Yorkshire, England. It contains four listed buildings that are recorded in the National Heritage List for England. All the listed buildings are designated at Grade II, the lowest of the three grades, which is applied to "buildings of national importance and special interest". The parish contains the hamlet of Stape and the surrounding countryside and moorland. The listed buildings consist of a house and three farmhouses.

== Buildings ==
Name and location	Photograph	Date	Notes
Farmhouse at Brown House; 54.34363°N 0.75409°W		Late 18th century	The farmhouse is in stone, with a pantile roof, two storeys and five bays. The windows are horizontally siding sashes. The farmhouse is flanked by single-storey outbuildings.
Cooks Grange Farmhouse; 54.29988°N 0.77645°W		Late 18th or early 19th century	The farmhouse is in stone, and has a pantile roof with stone coped gables and kneelers. There are two storeys, two bays, a lower extension for farm use, and a modern rear extension. The windows are sashes.
Farmhouse at Low Over Blow; 54.33047°N 0.76457°W		Early 19th century	The farmhouse is in stone with a pantile roof, two storeys and two bays. In the centre is a doorway, and the windows are horizontally siding sashes. Attached on the right are farm buildings.
Thornsby House; 54.31358°N 0.79151°W	—	Early 19th century	The house is in stone with a pantile roof. There are two storeys and four bays, and the windows are sashes. To the right is a lower stable extension.
