= Listed buildings in Newland, North Yorkshire =

Newland is a civil parish in the county of North Yorkshire, England. It contains two listed buildings that are recorded in the National Heritage List for England. Both the listed buildings are designated at Grade II, the lowest of the three grades, which is applied to "buildings of national importance and special interest". The parish contains the hamlet of Newland and the surrounding area. Both the listed buildings are in the hamlet, and consist of a pigeoncote and a house.

== Buildings ==
Name and location	Photograph	Date	Notes
Pigeoncote, Manor Farm; 53.71553°N 0.95751°W	—	Early 18th century	The pigeoncote is above a stable. It is in pinkish-brown brick with stone dressings, and has a pantile roof with stone coped gables and sandstone kneelers. There is a rectangular plan. In the south gable end is a round-arched entrance, and above it is a semicircular flight entrance with stone sills. In the east front is a small shuttered window and two vents.
Newland Hall; 53.71309°N 0.94332°W		Late 18th century (probable)	A house, later divided into two, in pinkish-brown brick, with an eaves band and a Welsh slate roof. There are two storeys, five bays and a projecting single-storey two-bay range on the right. On the front are two doorways, there is one casement window and the other windows are sashes, and all the openings have flat arches of gauged brick. In the right gable is a blocked pitching door.
