= Listed buildings in Great Timble =

Great Timble is a civil parish in the county of North Yorkshire, England. It contains seven listed buildings that are recorded in the National Heritage List for England. All the listed buildings are designated at Grade II, the lowest of the three grades, which is applied to "buildings of national importance and special interest". The parish contains the village of Timble and the surrounding countryside, and the listed buildings consist of houses, a farm building, a well cover and a telephone kiosk.

== Buildings ==
Name and location	Photograph	Date	Notes
Snowden View and Low House; 53.97180°N 1.72770°W		1683	A house divided into two, in gritstone, with quoins, and a stone slate roof with gable coping on the left. There are two storeys and each house has two bays. The left house has a central doorway with quoined jambs. To its left are three inserted windows, the left one with shaped chamfered lintel and over them is a continuous hood mould. To the right is a later window in a chamfered surround, and the upper floor contains two sash windows. In the right house is a central doorway with a moulded chamfered quoined surround, and an ogee head containing a dated and initialled recessed panel. To its left is a recessed chamfered mullioned window, to the right is a bay window, and above the ground floor openings is a continuous hood mould. In the upper floor is a window with a recessed chamfered surround and a window with a plain surround.
Highwood Farm; 53.97592°N 1.74796°W	—	Late 18th century	A stone cottage with quoins, and a stone slate roof with coped gables and kneelers. There are two storeys, on the front is a doorway with a flush surround, and the windows are mullioned. To the left is a single-storey outhouse.
Timble Inn; 53.97224°N 1.72721°W		Late 18th century	A house, later a public house, in gritstone, with quoins, and a stone slate roof with a shaped kneeler and coping on the left. There are two storeys, two bays, and an added bay on the right. In the centre of the original block is a doorway with tie-stone jambs, and the windows are mullioned with three stepped lights. The right bay contains a blocked doorway and sash windows.
Plumtree Farmhouse; 53.97252°N 1.72662°W		1778	Two cottages combined into one house, it is in gritstone, and has a stone slate roof with shaped kneelers and gable copings. There are two storeys and three bays. On the front is a doorway with tie-stone jambs, above which is an initialled and dated plaque, and to the right is a similar blocked doorway. The windows are sashes with mullions.
Barn south of Gill Beck Bridge; 53.98080°N 1.74189°W	—	Early 19th century	The barn and cartshed are in gritstone and have a stone slate roof. There are four bays and an outshut to the left bay. The openings include a cart entrance with a flat arch and splayed voussoirs, a round-arched cart entrance, doors with tie-stone jambs, vents, and circular openings in the gables.
Well cover 53.97237°N 1.72781°W		19th century (probable)	The well cover is in gritstone, and is about 1 metre (3 ft 3 in) square and 1.25 metres (4 ft 1 in) high. There is a segmental-arched opening on the south side, and a shallow pyramidal cap.
Telephone kiosk 53.97235°N 1.72687°W		1935	The K6 type telephone kiosk was designed by Giles Gilbert Scott. Constructed in cast iron with a square plan and a dome, it has three unperforated crowns in the top panels.
