= Listed buildings in Ellenthorpe =

Ellenthorpe is a civil parish in the county of North Yorkshire, England. It contains two listed buildings that are recorded in the National Heritage List for England. Both the listed buildings are designated at Grade II, the lowest of the three grades, which is applied to "buildings of national importance and special interest". The parish does not contain any significant settlements, and the listed buildings consist of a house and a farmhouse.

== Buildings ==
Name and location	Photograph	Date	Notes
Ellenthorpe Hall; 54.10052°N 1.37152°W		Early to mid 19th century	The house is in brick, with a stone eaves cornice and a pyramidal Westmorland slate roof. There are two storeys, a main block with three bays, and recessed three-bay wings. In the centre is a doorway with attached Doric columns carrying a dentilled triangular pediment, and a fanlight. The windows are sashes with incised stone lintels.
Ellenthorpe Lodge; 54.09828°N 1.35682°W	—	Early to mid 19th century	A farmhouse in brick with cogged eaves and a hipped grey slate roof. There are two storeys and three bays. In the centre is a doorway, and the windows are sashes in wood architraves with channelled lintels. In the right return is a doorway with reeded pilasters, a blocked fanlight, and an open pediment.
