= Barugh (Great and Little) =

Civil parish in North Yorkshire, England

Coordinates: 54.205°N 0.849°W

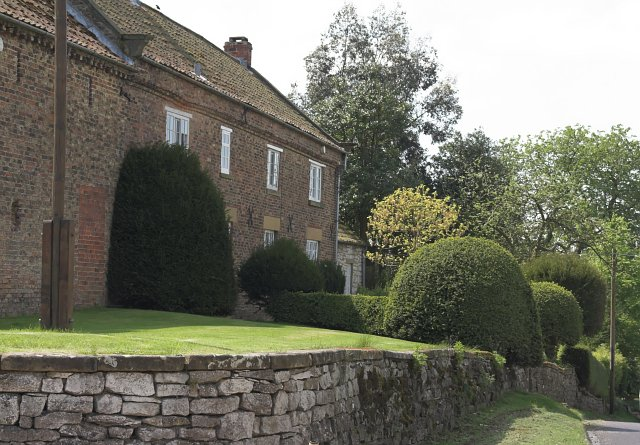
- Manor House at Great Barugh

- Location within North Yorkshire
- Population: 189 (2011 Census)
- OS grid reference: SE7478
- Civil parish: Barugh (Great and Little)
- Unitary authority: North Yorkshire
- Ceremonial county: North Yorkshire
- Region: Yorkshire and the Humber
- Country: England
- Sovereign state: United Kingdom
- Post town: MALTON
- Postcode district: YO17
- Dialling code: 01653
- Police: North Yorkshire
- Fire: North Yorkshire
- Ambulance: Yorkshire
- UK Parliament: Thirsk and Malton

Barugh (Great and Little) (/ˈbɑːrf, bɑːrk/) is a civil parish in North Yorkshire, England, covering Great Barugh and Little Barugh. Great Barugh is located at a junction on the road between Malton and Kirkbymoorside. Barugh is about 15 miles (24 km) west of Scarborough.

Between 1870 and 1872 Barugh was described as

"BARUGHS-AMBO, a township in Kirkby-Misperton parish, N. R. Yorkshire; 4 miles SW of Pickering. It consists of the hamlets of Great and Little Barugh. Acres, 1,433. Real property, £2,094. Pop., 318. Houses, 60. There is a well-preserved Roman camp at Great Barugh."

== History ==
The name "Barugh" means 'rise of the land' which has its origins in Anglo-Saxon. The name was first recorded as Berg and Berch in 1086 and comes from Old English beorg 'hill.' The pub in Great Barugh, which dates back to 1632, is the heart of the community; it is one of the oldest remaining buildings in the village. This is the only local village amenity, with Great and Little Barugh having no shops, post office or village Hall. Ruins have been found at sites in both Great and Little Barugh including those of a Roman villa. There is also evidence of a Roman road which led to York. There was a school in Great Barugh which opened in 1859; this has since been closed.

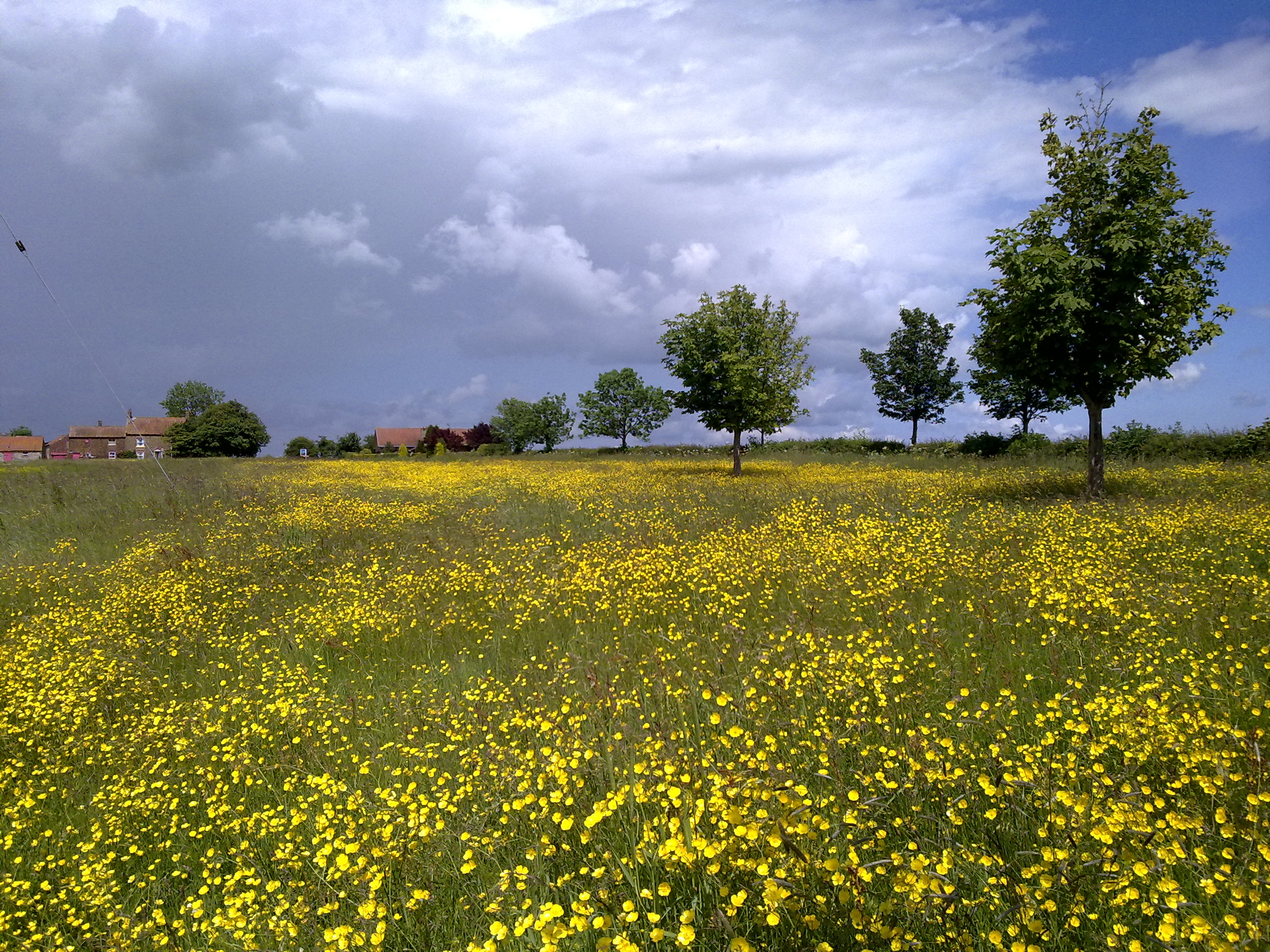
Little Barugh

Both Great and Little Barugh are mentioned in Domesday Book. Great Barugh is described as very small, with 2.1 households, and a quite large total assessed tax (6.5 geld units) Little Barugh also appears in Domesday Book. Again it is described as very small, with only 2.1 households. The total tax assessed for Little Barugh is again quite large (6 geld units). On 28 April 2017, the Tour de Yorkshire cycle race passed through both Barughs on the route from Malton to Kirbymisperton. The cyclists passing through Great Barugh can be seen on YouTube on https://www.youtube.com/watch?v=7bmni78I97g&t=21s

== Parish ==
Great Barugh and Little Barugh are both contained in the parish of Kirby Misperton. Little Barugh was enclosed around 1600. Both Little and Great Barugh contain Wesleyan chapels, the one at Great Barugh having been erected in 1899. Both buildings are now dwelling houses. The church of the Holy Saviour was built in 1850 at Great Barugh to serve as the small parish.

The Parish was formed when there was little difference to the people between the church and the state. The parish of Kirby Misperton was formed around the village and other small settlements.

Between 1974 and 2023 the parish was part of the Ryedale district. It is now administered by the unitary North Yorkshire Council.

== Population history ==
According to census information, the population of Barugh has declined since 1881, decreasing from 261 in 1881 to 153 in 1961. The population saw slight increases in 1911 and 1931. The 2011 census indicates that the population of Barugh is 189.

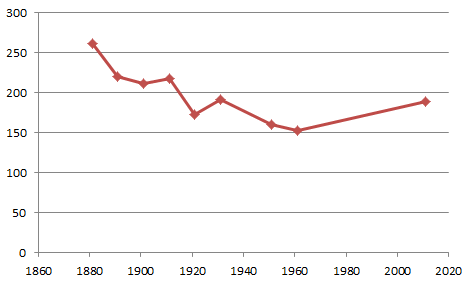
Population history of Barugh from 1881 -2011

2011 census data indicates that 23.3% of people are 45 to 59 years old, and 17.5% are 65 to 74 years old. The average age of a resident of Barugh is 45.

== Housing, transport and climate ==
According to the 2011 census 51% people lived in detached houses in Barugh with house prices averaging at £349,950. Little Barugh contains fewer houses altogether, many of them being holiday cottages. Housing in Barugh is classed as semi-detached and detached. It is described as a village surrounded by sparsely populated countryside.

There are two bus routes which go through both Little and Great Barugh. The nearest railway station is 7 miles away at Malton.

The graph on the right shows yearly average high and low temperatures in Barugh. Compared to the rest of the United Kingdom, the average temperatures are lower in Barugh. This could be because Barugh is in the North of the UK where Temperatures are colder. Barugh is just south of the North York Moors National Park.

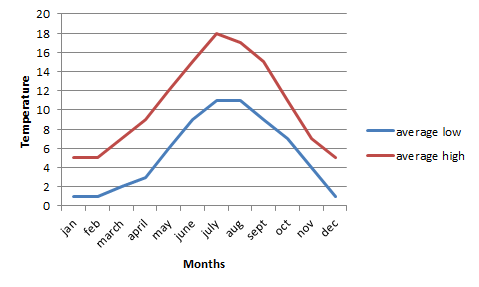
Average yearly high and low temperatures in Barugh

== Industry ==
A Vision of Britain through time describes the industry in Barugh in 1801 as a "population divided into "chiefly employed in agriculture" or "chiefly employed in trade, manufacture or handicraft"". Agriculture has always been the main occupations for the villagers but since World War One and the rapid mechanization that followed agriculture in Barugh has declined.

In the Census of 1881 it is recorded that 52 people worked in agriculture, 51 of whom were men. It is apparent many of the women in the village worked in Domestic Service or Offices. Many women were also recorded as having unspecified work. Agriculture was the biggest employer of the village in 1881.

There has been a shift in industry since 1881; in the 2011 census it was recorded that only 8 people now worked in Agriculture. Reasons for this could be due to mechanization or due to population decrease in Barugh. Today in Barugh, 13 people work in Wholesale or Retail trade and 12 people work in human health and social work. This is a massive shift in industry, people will commute to get to work now and not work in the village.

== See also ==
- Listed buildings in Barugh (Great and Little)
