= Listed buildings in Barugh (Great and Little) =

Barugh (Great and Little) is a civil parish in the county of North Yorkshire, England. It contains 14 listed buildings that are recorded in the National Heritage List for England. All the listed buildings are designated at Grade II, the lowest of the three grades, which is applied to "buildings of national importance and special interest". The parish contains the villages of Great Barugh and Little Barugh and the surrounding countryside. The listed buildings consist of houses, farmhouses and farm buildings, a former smithy, a bridge and two mileposts.

== Buildings ==
Name and location	Photograph	Date	Notes
Westfield Farmhouse and outbuilding 54.20762°N 0.83422°W	—	Early 18th century	The farmhouse and outbuilding are in sandstone with a pantile roof. The main block has two storeys and two bays, and to the left is a single-storey wing with two bays. Most of the windows are horizontally-sliding sashes.
Smithy; 54.20149°N 0.85156°W	—	Mid 18th century	A smithy, cart shed and stables converted for residential use, it is in limestone with quoins and a pantile roof. There is a single storey and five bays. On the front is a double doorway, and to the right is a doorway flanked by glazed louvre windows under a continuous lintel. At the rear are stable doors.
Westfield Old Farmhouse; 54.20890°N 0.83399°W	—	Mid 18th century	The farmhouse is in variegated brick, with a cogged eaves course, and a pantile roof with coped gables and shaped kneelers. There are two storeys and three bays. The doorway has a fanlight, above it is a shallow segmental-arched recess, and the windows are sashes.
Farm building northwest of Barugh House; 54.20176°N 0.85341°W	—	Late 18th century	The farm building consists of a threshing barn and granary, with a threshing shed at the rear. The barn is in brick with quoins, pilasters, dentilled eaves, and a pantile roof with coped gables and shaped kneelers. There are two storeys and four bays, and it contains stable doors and pitching holes. The shed is in limestone with brick piers, it has a pantile roof and a single storey. The shed contains two cart entrances, and in the gable is a round-arched opening.
Bragg Farmhouse and cottage 54.21689°N 0.86855°W		Late 18th century	The farmhouse and cottage are in limestone, and have pantile roofs with coped gables and shaped kneelers. The farmhouse has two storeys and three bays, and the cottage has a single storey and single bay. They both have a doorway, the windows are horizontally-sliding sashes, and all the openings have heavy lintels.
Manor Farmhouse and barn 54.20131°N 0.85326°W	—	Late 18th century	The farmhouse and the barn to the left are in brick, they have pantile roofs with coped gables and shaped kneelers, and two storeys. The farmhouse has three bays and a cogged eaves band. On the front is a doorway, above which is a top-hung window, and the other windows are horizontally-sliding sashes. The barn has five bays, a dentilled eaves course, pilasters, and slit vents. The second bay projects and contains a stable door.
Prospect Farmhouse and outbuilding 54.20950°N 0.83346°W	—	Late 18th century	The farmhouse is in variegated brick, with a cogged eaves course, and a pantile roof with coped gables and shaped kneelers. There are two storeys and two bays, and to the left is a single-storey two-bay wing. In the centre is a porch with an ogee gable and a finial, and the windows are sashes. The wing contains sash windows, a doorway and a pitching hole. All the openings have cambered heads.
Sevenfields Farmhouse; 54.20154°N 0.85356°W	—	Late 18th century	A farmhouse in red brick, with sandstone quoins on the right, and a Roman tile roof with coped gables and shaped kneelers. There are two storeys and two bays, and a rear service wing. The doorway is on the right, the windows are sashes, and all the openings have wedge lintels.
The Cottage; 54.20724°N 0.83436°W	—	Late 18th century	The house is in sandstone at the front, in red brick elsewhere, on a brick plinth, with quoins, a projecting eaves cornice, and a slate roof with coped gables and shaped kneelers. There are two storeys and three bays. In the centre is a doorway with a divided fanlight, it is flanked by sash windows, and all the openings have wedge lintels. The windows in the upper floor are horizontally-sliding sashes with painted keystones.
Barugh House; 54.20149°N 0.85428°W		Early 19th century	The house is in limestone on the front and the right return and brick elsewhere, with quoins, a coped parapet, and a pantile roof with coped gables. There are two storeys and five bays. In the fourth bay is a doorway with pilasters, a fanlight, and a cornice hood. To its right is a canted bay window, in the left bay is a French window, above the doorway is a round-arched sash window, and the other windows are sashes with wedge lintels.
Red House; 54.21005°N 0.86820°W		Early 19th century	The house is in red brick, and has a pantile roof with coped gables and shaped kneelers. There are two storeys and three bays. In the centre is a gabled porch, above it is a round-arched sash window with an archivolt, and the other windows are sashes with wedge lintels.
Barugh Bridge; 54.20232°N 0.85986°W		Mid 19th century (probable)	The bridge carries a road over a stream, and is in rusticated calcareous sandstone. It consists of two semicircular arches with voussoirs, and a central pier with cutwaters. The bridge has a band over the arches, and parapets with chamfered copings that end in low cylindrical piers with domed caps.
Milepost (north); 54.20384°N 0.86402°W		Late 19th century	The milepost on the north side of Barugh Lane is in white-painted cast iron with black raised lettering. It has a triangular plan and a sloping top. On the top is "NR C CC", on the left side is the distance to Malton, and on the right side to Kirkbymoorside.
Milepost (south); 54.19485°N 0.85302°W		Late 19th century	The milepost on the east side of Barugh Lane is in white-painted cast iron with black raised lettering. It has a triangular plan, a sloping top and a semicircular back plate, and is about 0.7 metres (2 ft 4 in) high. On the back plate is "NORTH RIDING OF YORKSHIRE", on the sloping top is "PICKERING", on the left side is the distance to Malton, and on the right side to Kirkbymoorside.
