= Listed buildings in Ellerbeck =

Ellerbeck is a civil parish in the county of North Yorkshire, England. It contains two listed buildings that are recorded in the National Heritage List for England. Both the listed buildings are designated at Grade II, the lowest of the three grades, which is applied to "buildings of national importance and special interest". The parish contains the village of Ellerbeck and the surrounding countryside, and the listed buildings consist of a farmhouse, and a set of gates and gate piers.

== Buildings ==
Name and location	Photograph	Date	Notes
Little Bridge Farmhouse; 54.36420°N 1.33699°W		17th century	The farmhouse is in stone, and has a pantile roof with shaped kneelers and stone coping. There are two storeys and three bays. The doorway has a plain surround, and the windows are casements. To the left of the middle bay are two round openings, one with a diamond-shaped surround and the other with a square surround.
Gates and gate piers, Boville Park Lodge; 54.36656°N 1.32149°W	—	Early 19th century	The gate piers are in stone with plain coping. The gates are in cast iron, each gate is quadrant-headed and has anthemion and scroll motifs to the lower panels, and radiating bars to the top.
