= Listed buildings in Landmoth-cum-Catto =

Landmoth-cum-Catto is a civil parish in the county of North Yorkshire, England. It contains two listed buildings that are recorded in the National Heritage List for England. Both the listed buildings are designated at Grade II, the lowest of the three grades, which is applied to "buildings of national importance and special interest". The parish is rural, and the listed buildings consist of a farmhouse and a private house.

== Buildings ==
Name and location	Photograph	Date	Notes
Catto Hall; 54.32450°N 1.34388°W	—	17th century	A farmhouse in stone, partly rendered, with sprocketed eaves and a pantile roof. There are two storeys and three bays, and a single-bay extension on the right. The doorway has a fanlight and a moulded four-centred arched lintel. Most of the windows are casements, and all the openings have chamfered surrounds. On the east side is an original two-light mullioned window.
Marigold Hall; 54.33181°N 1.34039°W	—	1679	The house, which was extended to the right in the 19th century, is in stone on a plinth, and has a pantile roof with stone copings. There are two storeys and five bays, the right two bays later and recessed. The doorway has rusticated pilasters, outside which are taller Roman Doric pilasters. Above the door is a frieze including initials and the date, and above it is a moulded oval containing a carved marigold flower, flanking which is a broken segmental pediment. To the far left is a similar doorcase. The older part contains chamfered mullioned and transomed widows in architraves, and the windows in the later part are casements. In the older part is a moulded cornice, and a sundial, also with a moulded cornice.
