= Listed buildings in Hutton Mulgrave =

Hutton Mulgrave is a civil parish in the county of North Yorkshire, England. It contains 13 listed buildings that are recorded in the National Heritage List for England. All the listed buildings are designated at Grade II, the lowest of the three grades, which is applied to "buildings of national importance and special interest". The parish contains the village of Hutton Mulgrave and the surrounding countryside, and the listed buildings consist of farmhouses, farm buildings, houses and a cottage.

== Buildings ==
| Name and location | Photograph | Date | Notes |
|---|---|---|---|
| Espsyke Farmhouse; 54.48738°N 0.72773°W | — | Early to mid 18th century | The farmhouse is in sandstone, with a pantile roof, and a stone ridge, copings and block kneelers. There are two storeys, the older part has two bays, and the slightly projecting main house has two wide bays. The doorway has a wedge lintel with a raised keystone. There is one sash window, one fixed light, and the other windows are casements, those in the ground floor of the main house with wedge lintels and keystones. |
| Coquet Nook Farmhouse; 54.46896°N 0.76788°W | — | Mid 18th century | The farmhouse is in sandstone, with a pantile roof, and a stone ridge, copings and block kneelers. The main house has two storeys and two bays, and to the left is a recessed downhouse with one storey and an attic, and one wide bay. The windows are casements, and in the downhouse are two dormers. |
| Barton Howl and outhouse 54.46436°N 0.76206°W | — | Mid to late 18th century | An inn, later a private house, in sandstone on a plinth, with a pantile roof, stone copings and block kneelers. The main part has two storeys and three bays. The central doorway is flanked by a tripartite sash window and a casement window, each with extended lintels and tall keystones, and the windows elsewhere are casements. The downhouse is to the right, and on the left is an outhouse with a porch. |
| Low Farmhouse and outbuilding 54.48028°N 0.71156°W | | Late 18th century (probable) | The farmhouse is in sandstone on a plinth, and has a pantile roof with copings and block kneelers. There are two storeys and two bays, a recessed lower two-storey two-bay downhouse to the left with a lean-to, and a single-storey single-bay outbuilding recessed on the right. Most of the windows are casements, there is one sash window and the rear doorway has a lintel with a keystone. |
| Stable-byre north-west of Low Farmhouse; 54.48036°N 0.71187°W | — | Late 18th century | The farm building is in sandstone, and has a pantile roof with stone copings and kneelers. There is a single storey stepped down a hill, and it contains four stable doors. It has a lean-to and a loading platform. |
| Rock Head Cottage; 54.48954°N 0.69935°W | — | Late 18th century (probable) | The cottage is in sandstone, and has a pantile roof with a stone ridge, copings and block kneelers. There are two storeys, three narrow bays, a projecting lean-to porch on the right, and an extension beyond. The windows are casements, those at the rear with wedge lintels and raised keystones. |
| Allerton Head Farmhouse and outbuildings 54.47738°N 0.72064°W | — | Late 18th or early 19th century | The farmhouse is in sandstone, and has a pantile roof with a stone ridge, copings and block kneelers. There are two storeys and two bays. The doorway has a fanlight, the ground floor windows are casements, and in the upper floor are fixed lights with top opening sections. To the north is an L-shaped single-storey range of stables and byres. |
| Pigsty east of Allerton Head Farmhouse; 54.47737°N 0.72039°W | — | Late 18th or early 19th century | The pigsty is in sandstone, and has a pantile roof with a stone ridge, copings and block kneelers. There is one storey and two bays, the left bay wider. It contains a doorway, four feeding chutes, and an opening above. |
| Briscoe Farmhouse; 54.47486°N 0.74077°W | | Late 18th or early 19th century | Two houses later combined, in pink sandstone with a pantile roof, a tile ridge, and stone copings and kneelers. There are two storeys and a T-shaped plan, consisting of a two-bay front facing the road, a lean-to on the left, and a rear wing. The front range has sash windows in chamfered reveals, and in the right return is a doorway and a stair window. In the rear wing are casement windows, sashes, and a cross window. |
| Moorgate Farmhouse and outbuildings 54.47618°N 0.73137°W | | Late 18th or early 19th century | The farmhouse and farm buildings form a long range, and are in sandstone with pantile roofs, stone ridges, copings and block kneelers. The main house has two storeys and two wide bays, and the downhouse has two storeys, one wide bay and a passage bay with a doorway. The windows are casements. To the right is a two-storey barn with a single-storey extension containing a stable door, and to the left is a single storey stable with a horizontally-sliding sash window and a stable door. |
| Byre and stable-cartshed north of Low Farmhouse; 54.48060°N 0.71174°W | — | Early 19th century | The farm buildings are in sandstone, and have roofs with a stone ridge, copings and kneelers, hipped on the right. There is a single storey, and the stable-cartshed is later and stepped up a hill. The buildings contain plain and stable doors, and part of the cartshed is open. |
| Barn northeast of Low Farmhouse; 54.48048°N 0.71139°W | — | Early to mid 19th century | The barn is in sandstone, and has pantile roofs with stone copings and kneelers. There are two storeys and a single-storey wing on the west. In the main part is a stable door and a loading door, and the wing has a garage door. |
| Yard wall, Moorgate Farmhouse; 54.47611°N 0.73129°W | — | Undated | The wall between the inner yard and the main farmhouse is in sandstone with flat coping. At the left end is a square monolith pier. |
