= Listed buildings in Newton Mulgrave =

Newton Mulgrave is a civil parish in the county of North Yorkshire, England. It contains six listed buildings that are recorded in the National Heritage List for England. All the listed buildings are designated at Grade II, the lowest of the three grades, which is applied to "buildings of national importance and special interest". The parish contains the village of Newton Mulgrave and the surrounding countryside. All the listed buildings are in the countryside, and consist of houses, farmhouses and farm buildings.

== Buildings ==
Name and location	Photograph	Date	Notes
Grasshill House; 54.53217°N 0.79292°W	—	18th century	A house and a cottage in stone, both with two bays. The house has a pantile roof, two storeys and an attic, and the cottage has a Welsh slate roof and two bays, the roofs with stone copings. The doorway is in the cottage, and the windows are sashes. To the left is a lower extension with two storeys and two bays, containing a doorway, a sash window and two granary lights.
Old Castle Farmhouse; 54.49440°N 0.81406°W	—	18th century	The farmhouse is in stone, with quoins, and a pantile roof with stone copings and square kneelers. There are two storeys and two bays. The windows are sashes in architraves, and the entrance is in a single-storey extension on the right.
America House and barn 54.52299°N 0.80162°W		Late 18th century	A house and cottage, later combined, in stone, with a floor band, and a pantile roof with stone copings and square kneelers. Each part has two storeys, the house with three bays, the cottage lower and narrower with two bays. The house has a large stair window, and the other windows in both parts are sashes. To the west is a barn extension.
Barn and gin-gang, America House; 54.52255°N 0.80114°W	—	Late 18th century	The building is in stone, and has pantile roofs with stone copings and square kneelers. The barn is large with two storeys, and contains four stable doors and feeding holes. There is a single-storey extension and an attached half-octagonal gin-gang.
Folly Hall Farmhouse, barn and stable 54.49211°N 0.80408°W	—	Late 18th or early 19th century	The buildings are in stone, and have pantile roofs with stone copings and square kneelers. The farmhouse has quoins, two storeys and two bays, a wooden porch and sash windows. The barn extends to the north, and the stable range runs to the east and ends in a cart shed with a shouldered doorway.
Barn, stable and byres north of Grasshill House; 54.53231°N 0.79328°W		Early 19th century (probable)	The farm buildings are in stone with pantile roofs, and are arranged around a courtyard. Most have one storey, some have lofts, and the openings, which include stable doors, are plain.
