= Listed buildings in Langthorne =

Langthorne is a civil parish in the county of North Yorkshire, England. It contains four listed buildings that are recorded in the National Heritage List for England. All the listed buildings are designated at Grade II, the lowest of the three grades, which is applied to "buildings of national importance and special interest". The parish contains the village of Langthorne and the surrounding countryside, and the listed buildings consist of a house, a barn, a farmhouse and a telephone kiosk.

== Buildings ==
Name and location	Photograph	Date	Notes
The Hall; 54.31982°N 1.61502°W		1719	The house is in red brick, with stone dressings, chamfered quoins, dentilled eaves, and a stone slate roof with stone coping and shaped kneelers. There are two storeys, five bays, the middle bay projecting slightly, and two rear wings. In the centre is a doorway with a fanlight and a keystone. The windows are sashes with flat heads and keystones.
Barn northwest of The Hall; 54.31996°N 1.61530°W		18th century	The barn is in stone, and has roofs of pantile and stone slate. There are two storeys and a T-shaped plan. The main range has stable doors and various blocked openings, and in the wing are quoins, basket-arched doorways, and stone coping.
Storra Pasture; 54.31246°N 1.61496°W	—	1763	A farmhouse in red brick with stone dressings, quoins, a floor band, dentilled eaves, and a tile roof with stone coping and shaped kneelers. There are two storeys, three bays, and a rear wing. The central doorway has a quoined surround, and a lintel with a dated keystone. The windows are horizontally-sliding sashes.
Telephone kiosk 54.31963°N 1.61513°W		1935	The K6 type telephone kiosk was designed by Giles Gilbert Scott. Constructed in cast iron with a square plan and a dome, it has three unperforated crowns in the top panels.
