= Listed buildings in Scosthrop =

Scosthrop is a civil parish in the county of North Yorkshire, England. It contains four listed buildings that are recorded in the National Heritage List for England. All the listed buildings are designated at Grade II, the lowest of the three grades, which is applied to "buildings of national importance and special interest". The parish contains the village of Scosthrop and the surrounding countryside. The listed buildings consist of a former manor house, two farmhouses and a barn.

== Buildings ==
Name and location	Photograph	Date	Notes
Scosthrop Manor House; 54.03230°N 2.15191°W		Early 17th century	The former manor house is in stone, with a stone slate roof, two storeys and five bays. On the front is a two-storey porch with a coped gable, shaped kneelers, and ball finials. The doorway has moulded jambs, over which is an initialled datestone and a hood mould, and above is a stepped mullioned and transomed window. Elsewhere, the windows are mullioned with casements.
Barn adjoining Dykelands Farmhouse; 54.03717°N 2.15976°W	—	1703	The barn is in stone with a stone slate roof. There are two storeys and two bays. In the centre is a porch, and to the right is a loft entrance with a chamfered surround and a basket-arched head, with the date and initials in a shallow recessed panel.
Dykelands Farmhouse; 54.03719°N 2.15953°W	—	18th century	The farmhouse is in stone, with eaves modillions and a stone slate roof. There are two storeys and three bays. The doorway has plain jambs on square blocks, and a plain lintel with a gabled hood. The windows are mullioned, and contain casements. The rear incorporates a 17th-century window with a chamfered surround, and contains a round-headed window with double-chamfered jambs and stone voussoirs.
Town End Farmhouse; 54.03209°N 2.15313°W	—	Early 19th century	The farmhouse is in stone, and has a stone slate roof with stone coped gables and shaped kneelers. There are two storeys and two bays. The central doorway has a projecting sandstone surround. The windows have three lights, the middle light a sash, and stone surrounds. At the rear is a mullioned window, and windows with mullions removed. Also at the rear are structures incorporating dated items from the 17th century.
