= Listed buildings in Hartoft =

Hartoft is a civil parish in the county of North Yorkshire, England. It contains two listed buildings that are recorded in the National Heritage List for England. Both the listed buildings are designated at Grade II, the lowest of the three grades, which is applied to "buildings of national importance and special interest". The parish contains the small settlement of Hartoft and the surrounding countryside and moorland. The listed buildings consist of a farmhouse and stable, and a road bridge.

== Buildings ==
| Name and location | Photograph | Date | Notes |
|---|---|---|---|
| Birch House Farmhouse and stable 54.34903°N 0.83654°W | | 1671 | The farmhouse was rebuilt in 1804, incorporating parts of the earlier house. It is in sandstone, and has a pantile roof with coped gables and shaped kneelers. There are two storeys, the high end and low end each with two bays, and a rear outshut. The windows are sashes, some horizontally-sliding, and other openings include a stable door. On one kneeler is an initialled datestone. |
| Hamer Bridge; 54.36857°N 0.85835°W | | Mid to late 18th century | The bridge carries Hamer Bank over Hamer Beck. It is in sandstone, and consists of a single semicircular arch with voussoirs, flanked by caned abutments. There is a timber fence in place of a parapet. |
