= Listed buildings in Sutton-under-Whitestonecliffe =

Sutton-under-Whitestonecliffe is a civil parish in the county of North Yorkshire, England. It contains eleven listed buildings that are recorded in the National Heritage List for England. All the listed buildings are designated at Grade II, the lowest of the three grades, which is applied to "buildings of national importance and special interest". The parish contains the village of Sutton-under-Whitestonecliffe and the surrounding countryside. Most of the listed buildings are houses and associated structures, and the others include a bridge, a former church and two mileposts.

== Buildings ==
Name and location	Photograph	Date	Notes
Paper Mill Cottage; 54.23745°N 1.26278°W	—	Early 16th century or earlier	The house has a timber framed core, the ground floor on the front is rendered, the upper floor is in close studding, the left return is in stone with quoins, the right return is in brick on a stone base, and the roof is pantiled, hipped on the right. There are two storeys and four bays, and a rear aisle clad in brick. On the front is a doorway, and the windows are horizontally sliding sashes. Inside, there is exposed timber framing, and two inglenook fireplaces.
Seven Stars; 54.23613°N 1.25604°W	—	16th century (probable)	The house has a cruck framed core, it is enclosed in rendered stone and brick, and has a tile roof. There is a single storey and attics, three bays, and extensions to the left and at the rear. On the front is a gabled porch, the windows are horizontally sliding sashes, and on the attic are three gabled dormers with bargeboards and finials. Inside, some of the cruck frame is visible, and there is some wattle and daub infill.
Sutton Hall; 54.23705°N 1.26068°W		Late 17th century	The house is in orange sandstone on a chamfered plinth, with grey stone dressings, quoins, a floor band, an eaves band, a modillion cornice, and hipped slate roofs. There are two storeys, a main range of seven bays, the middle three bays recessed, and a projecting three-bay block on the left. On the front is a porch with a pediment, and a doorway with a fanlight, a pulvinated frieze and a keystone, and both have moulded eared architraves. Above them is an oculus with keystones. Flanking the porch are casement windows, elsewhere there are French windows, and the rest of the windows are sashes in moulded architraves. On the right return is a bay window, and on the left return is a two-storey bay window with Tuscan pilasters.
Garden wall and garden house, Sutton Hall; 54.23719°N 1.25948°W	—	Early 18th century	The garden house to the northeast of the house is in stone, and has a Welsh slate roof with moulded coping. At the front is a Venetian opening with Tuscan columns, a moulded architrave and a keystone. At the rear are quoins and a blocked opening. The front of the house is in line with the wall, which is in orange-red brick with stone at the rear, and has an L-shaped plan. It is about 3 metres (9.8 ft) in height with flat stone coping, and contains a gateway flanked by stone piers with stepped capstones.
Garden House, Sutton Hall; 54.23678°N 1.25984°W	—	18th century	The garden house to southeast of the house is in the form of a temple, and is in stone, with a rectangular plan and a pyramidal Welsh slate roof. It is open-fronted, with four Tuscan columns on a podium, carrying a Classical entablature with a triglyph frieze and a corniced pediment. On the sides are a plinth and an eaves band, and inside there is a stone table with a moulded edge.
Low Cleaves; 54.24194°N 1.24112°W		Mid-18th century	The farmhouse is in red and pink brick, with stone on the rear and left return, a floor band, stepped and dentilled eaves, and a pantile roof. There are two storeys and three bays, the left bay later and taller. The doorway has fluted pilasters and an entablature. The windows are sashes, some horizontally sliding, and at the rear is a tall round-headed stair window.
Former post office and stores 54.23641°N 1.25830°W	—	Mid to late 18th century	The building is in stone, with quoins, and a tile roof with stone coping and shaped kneelers. There are two storeys and three bays. On the front is a doorway, three canted bay windows on the ground floor, and sash windows in architraves above.
Sutton Bridge; 54.23657°N 1.26378°W		Early 19th century	The bridge, which was rebuilt in 1897, carries Sutton Road (A170 road) over Sutton Beck. It is in stone, and consists of a single round arch. The bridge has a hood mould, pilaster buttresses, and wing walls ending in circular piers. There is a band below the parapet that has round-topped coping. On the southeast buttress is a stone carved in relief.
Former Methodist Church; 54.23557°N 1.25326°W	—	1850	The former church is in stone, with quoins, and a grey slate roof with stone coping. There is a single storey, a square plan, and a lower pentagonal bay at the rear. In the centre is a gabled porch with bargeboards, and a round-arched doorway with a quoined surround. Above it is an inscribed and dated stone in an oval recess. Flanking the porch are round-arched sash windows, and on the returns are flat-arched sash windows.
Milepost near Whitestone Gardens; 54.23458°N 1.24896°W		Late 19th century	The milepost on the south side of the A170 road is in cast iron, and has a triangular plan and a sloping top. On the top is inscribed "NRYCC", on the left face is the distance to Thirsk, and on the right face to Helmsley.
Milepost near Gormire Lake; 54.23628°N 1.22474°W		Late 19th century	The milepost on the south side of the A170 road is in cast iron, and has a triangular plan and a sloping top. On the top is inscribed "NRYCC", on the left face is the distance to Thirsk, and on the right face to Helmsley.
