= Listed buildings in Fadmoor =

Fadmoor is a civil parish in the county of North Yorkshire, England. It contains two listed buildings that are recorded in the National Heritage List for England. Both the listed buildings are designated at Grade II, the lowest of the three grades, which is applied to "buildings of national importance and special interest". The parish contains the village of Fadmoor and the surrounding countryside, and the listed buildings consist of a house and a farmhouse.

== Buildings ==
Name and location	Photograph	Date	Notes
Laburnum Cottage; 54.29611°N 0.96162°W	—	18th century	The house is in stone with quoins and a pantile roof. There are two storeys, and a lean-to on the left. The windows are sashes, some horizontally-sliding, Inside there is an inglenook fireplace.
Westfield Farmhouse; 54.29497°N 0.96412°W	—	Mid 18th century	The farmhouse is in limestone, with quoins, a stepped eaves course and a pantile roof. There are two storeys and four bays. The doorway has a plain surround, and the windows are a mix of casements and horizontally-sliding sashes.
