= Listed buildings in Theakston, North Yorkshire =

Theakston is a civil parish in the county of North Yorkshire, England. It contains four listed buildings that are recorded in the National Heritage List for England. All the listed buildings are designated at Grade II, the lowest of the three grades, which is applied to "buildings of national importance and special interest". The parish contains the village of Theakston and the surrounding area, and all the listed buildings are houses in the village.

== Buildings ==
Name and location	Photograph	Date	Notes
Grooms Cottage; 54.26567°N 1.53864°W	—	Mid to late 18th century	The house is in red brick, and has a stone slate roof with stone coping. There are two storeys and three bays. The central doorway has a blocked fanlight, the windows are sashes, and all the openings have flat stone arches and keystones.
Theakston Lodge; 54.26544°N 1.53944°W	—	Mid to late 18th century	The house is in red brick on a plinth, with stone dressings, stepped eaves, and a stone slate roof with stone coping and plain kneelers. There are two storeys and four bays. In the centre is a doorway with Doric half-columns, a fanlight, a frieze, a dentilled cornice, and a pediment containing an urn and a swag in low relief. The windows are sashes with flat stone arches, voussoirs and keystones.
Elm House; 54.26528°N 1.53864°W	—	Late 18th century	Two houses combined into one, it is in rendered stone with a Welsh slate roof. There are two storeys and three bays. On the front are two doorways with fanlights. The windows are sashes, the window in the central bay a tall round-arched stair window.
The Hall; 54.26549°N 1.54010°W	—	Late 18th century	The house is in rendered red brick and stone on a plinth, with stepped eaves, and a hipped stone slate roof. There are two storeys and nine bays, The middle three bays are higher and canted. On the front are two doorways with moulded surrounds, fanlights, cornices and consoles, the left doorway with a latticed porch. The windows are sashes, those in the middle three bays with round-arched heads.
