= Listed buildings in Balk, North Yorkshire =

Balk is a civil parish in the county of North Yorkshire, England. It contains three listed buildings that are recorded in the National Heritage List for England. All the listed buildings are designated at Grade II, the lowest of the three grades, which is applied to "buildings of national importance and special interest". The parish contains the hamlet of Balk and the surrounding area. The listed buildings are all in the hamlet, and consist of a pair of houses, a former barn, and a former mill.

== Buildings ==
Name and location	Photograph	Date	Notes
Mill House and Park House; 54.22102°N 1.27270°W		Mid to late 18th century (probable)	A pair of houses in red brick, with stepped dentilled eaves, and a pantile roof with stone coping and shaped kneelers. There are three storeys and six bays, the left two bays added later. On the front is a porch, and all the windows have flat brick arches; in the lower two floors they are sashes and the top floor contains casements.
Caravan Park Shop; 54.22170°N 1.27283°W	—	Late 18th century (probable)	A barn converted for other uses, it is in red brick, with dentilled eaves, and a pantile roof with stone coping and a shaped kneeler on the left. The openings include a wide cart arch with a cambered lintel, blocked with a door inserted, doorways with round brick arches, square openings, slit vents and a hatch. On the left, steps lead up to a doorway with a round-arched head.
Balk Mill; 54.22076°N 1.27302°W	—	Late 18th to early 19th century	The former flax mill is in pinkish brick with a pantile roof. There are three storeys and a loft, and fronts of five and three bays. The openings include doorways, and windows with segmental heads, brick arches, and stone sills.
