= Listed buildings in Ferrensby =

Ferrensby is a civil parish in the county of North Yorkshire, England. It contains two listed buildings that are recorded in the National Heritage List for England. Both the listed buildings are designated at Grade II, the lowest of the three grades, which is applied to "buildings of national importance and special interest". The parish contains the village of Ferrensby and the surrounding countryside, and both the listed buildings are houses near the centre of the village.

== Buildings ==
Name and location	Photograph	Date	Notes
Lake View Farmhouse and Cottage; 54.04092°N 1.43798°W		16th century	A house with a timber framed core, it was later enclosed partly in stone and partly in brick, and the east end was rebuilt in brick. The roof is partly in grey slate and partly in stone slate. There are two storeys, a two-bay central range, a gabled bay on the left, and on the right are two taller bays forming the cottage. The windows are a mix of casements and horizontally-sliding sashes. In the central range is a doorway, the left bay has an eaves band and a bargeboard to the gable, and the right bays have a floor band.
Long Cottage; 54.04090°N 1.43757°W	—	Late 17th century	A house divided into two, in red brick on the front and rendered on the left return. It has a floor band, a dentilled eaves cornice, and a pantile roof. There are two storeys, three bays, and a rear outshut. On the front are two doorways, and long windows with a central casement, and one with a horizontally-sliding sash.
