= Listed buildings in Newby, Hambleton =

Newby, Hambleton is a civil parish in the county of North Yorkshire, England. It contains eight listed buildings that are recorded in the National Heritage List for England. All the listed buildings are designated at Grade II, the lowest of the three grades, which is applied to "buildings of national importance and special interest". The parish contains the village of Newby and the surrounding countryside. Apart from a church, all the listed buildings are houses, farmhouses and farm buildings.

== Buildings ==
| Name and location | Photograph | Date | Notes |
|---|---|---|---|
| Tunstall Cottage; 54.49812°N 1.18717°W | — | Late 17th century | The house is in large dressed stone, with the upper courses in red brick, and a Welsh slate roof with stone coping and kneelers. There are two storeys, two bays, and flanking wings. On the front is a doorway, and the windows are modern small-pane casements. |
| The Haven; 54.50117°N 1.21693°W | — | Early 18th century | The farmhouse is in rendered brick, and has a pantile roof with brick copings and shaped kneelers. There are two storeys and two bays. The doorway is in the centre, the windows on the front are casements, and at the rear is a horizontally-sliding sash window. |
| Newby Grange; 54.49815°N 1.20024°W | | 18th century | The house is in pinkish brick, partly rendered, with a stepped eaves cornice at the rear, and a roof of concrete pantiles with stone coping and kneelers. Thee are two storeys, a main block of three bays, with recessed flanking wings. The windows are modern, those in the main block with flat gauged brick arches and keystones. Inside the porch are re-set datestones. |
| Farm building south of The Haven; 54.50092°N 1.21703°W | — | 18th century | The farm building is in two parts, both with pantile roofs. The older part is in large stones, with a cornice band, one storey and a loft, and three bays. The openings include two stable doors, and a blocked cart opening. The later part is in red brick on a plinth, and contains a shuttered window. |
| Long Farm House; 54.50185°N 1.21752°W | — | Late 18th century | The farmhouse is in red brick with a pantile roof. There are two storeys, two bays, and a single-storey extension to the right. The doorway is in the centre, and the windows are modern, with stuccoed lintels and stone sills. |
| Antelope Lodge and outbuildings 54.50022°N 1.23102°W | | 1811 | A farmhouse in rendered brick, with a Welsh slate roof and stone copings. There are two storeys and a single-storey link to the outbuilding, which consists of a cart shed and granary at right angles to the north of the house. It is in brick, and has two storeys and five bays. There are three open segmental-arches on the ground floor and segmental-arched openings above. |
| Farm buildings north of Newby Grange; 54.49827°N 1.20031°W | — | Early 19th century | The farm buildings are in pinkish brick with pantile roofs. They consist of four parallel ranges, with the outer ones wrapped round the inner. The east range is the largest, and has a south gable with copings and kneelers. Most of the openings have segment heads, and some contain sash windows. |
| Newby Methodist Church; 54.50367°N 1.22022°W | — | 1826 | The chapel is in red brick with a roof of concrete pantiles, and one storey. The central doorway has an architrave, and is flanked by fixed-light windows. All the openings have flat gauged brick arches, and above the doorway is an inscribed and dated plaque. |
