= Listed buildings in Rathmell =

Rathmell is a civil parish in the county of North Yorkshire, England. It contains 16 listed buildings that are recorded in the National Heritage List for England. Of these, one is listed at Grade II*, the middle of the three grades, and the others are at Grade II, the lowest grade. The parish contains the village of Rathmell and the surrounding countryside. Most of the listed buildings are farmhouses, houses, cottages and farm buildings, and the others include a footbridge, a church and a telephone kiosk.

== Key ==
Grade	Criteria
II*	Particularly important buildings of more than special interest
II	Buildings of national importance and special interest

== Buildings ==
Name and location	Photograph	Date	Notes	Grade
Sheepwash Footbridge; 54.04426°N 2.33159°W		17th century (probable)	The bridge carries a footpath over Rathmell Beck. It is in stone, and consists of a single segmental arch of voussoirs. The bridge has a coped parapet.	II
Swainsteads; 54.04715°N 2.31495°W	—	1676	The farmhouse was extended to the right in the 17th century. It is in stone with a stone slate roof, and has two storeys and five bays. The doorway has a moulded surround and a decorated, dated and initialled lintel, and a hood mould. The windows are mullioned, some with hood moulds. Inside, there is a fireplace with a massive decorated, initialled and dated lintel.	II
1–3 College Fold; 54.03590°N 2.30064°W	—	1686	A school converted into three cottages, it is in stone with a slate roof. There are two storeys and four bays. On the front are three doorways with plain surrounds, one with a porch. Most of the windows are mullioned, mostly stepped, and on the right bay are sash windows. At the rear is a dated and initialled lintel, and a window with a chamfered surround and a basket arch.	II
Green Farmhouse; 54.04070°N 2.30955°W	—	1689	The farmhouse is in stone with a stone slate roof, two storeys and four bays. On the second bay is a projecting gabled porch, containing a doorway with a moulded surround and a decorated initialled and dated lintel. To its left is a two-light mullioned window, and above is a sundial with an iron gnomon, a three-light stepped mullioned window, and a panel in the gable. The outer bays contain mullioned windows, and there is a blocked fire window with a chamfered surround.	II
Huggon House; 54.04067°N 2.31261°W	—	c.1690	The farmhouse is in stone with a stone slate roof, two storeys and five bays. The central doorway has a chamfered surround and a decorated lintel, with a carving in bas relief. The windows were cross windows, but most mullions and transoms are missing, and the window above the doorway is blocked.	II
Littlebank Farmhouse; 54.05428°N 2.31094°W	—	1693	The farmhouse is in stone with a stone slate roof, two storeys, a double pile plan, and five bays. The middle bay has a projecting gabled two-storey porch containing a doorway with a moulded surround, and a decorated inscribed and dated lintel. To is left is a doorway, and above is a three-light stepped mullioned window with a segmental hood mould above. On the left bay is a mullioned window with a hood mould on the ground floor, and a window with a moulded surround above. The right bay has a conservatory, and on the upper floor is a sash window with a moulded surround.	II
Barn, Far Cappleside Farm; 54.02725°N 2.30529°W	—	1698	The barn is in stone with a stone slate roof and five bays. In the centre is a wagon entrance with a chamfered surround and a segmental arch of chamfered voussoirs, and the windows are sashes. On the right return are two former entrances with chamfered jambs and Tudor arched lintels, partly blocked to form windows.	II
Lumb Farmhouse and barn 54.05560°N 2.31188°W		1702	The farmhouse is in stone with a stone slate roof, two storeys and four bays. The doorway has a chamfered surround and a decorated dated and initialled lintel. There is a single-light window to the left of the doorway, and the other windows are mullioned, with a continuous hood mould over the lower floor openings. Inside, there is an elaborate inglenook fireplace. The barn to the left is higher and dates from the 19th century.	II
Cappleside Barn; 54.02847°N 2.30031°W		1714	The barn, which was later extended, is in sandstone on a plinth, with quoins, and a roof of sandstone flags with moulded gable coping and shaped kneelers. There are six bays, porches and lean-tos. The openings include doorways with quoined surrounds, cart entrances, one with segmental arch of voussoirs, windows, slit vents, and owl holes in the gables. On the barn is an initialled datestone.	II*
Cappleside Farmhouse; 54.02886°N 2.30690°W	—	Early 18th century	The oldest part is the rear block, with the main part of the farmhouse dating from about 1830. It is in stone, with quoins, a moulded eaves cornice, and a hipped slate roof. There are two storeys and the front has three bays. The central doorway has engaged Tuscan pillars, a round-headed fanlight and an open pediment, and the windows are sashes. On the right return is an earlier doorway with a moulded surround, now converted into a window, and cross windows.	II
Beautry Farmhouse; 54.03401°N 2.29974°W	—	Mid-18th century	The farmhouse is in stone, and has a slate roof with shaped kneelers and stone coping. There are two storeys and three bays. The central doorway has jambs on square blocks, and an open pediment on consoles. The windows on the front are mullioned with three lights, at the rear is a round-arched stair window and sash windows, and on the left gable is a bullseye window with keystones.	II
Cross Keys; 54.03640°N 2.30064°W	—	Mid-18th century	An inn, later a farmhouse, it is rendered, and has stone dressings, and a slate roof with shaped kneelers and gable coping. There are two storeys and two bays. In the centre is a doorway with a plain surround on square bases. The windows are mullioned, the mullions in the upper floor windows are missing, and at the rear is an entrance with a chamfered surround.	II
Millgate Farmhouse; 54.03245°N 2.30079°W	—	c. 1820	The farmhouse is in stone with projecting quoins, a moulded eaves cornice, and a slate roof with gable coping. The central doorway has a plain surround and a moulded pediment, and the windows are sashes. At the rear is a reset decorated lintel.	II
Holy Trinity Church; 54.03507°N 2.30009°W		1842	The chancel and vestry were added to the church in 1883. The church is built in stone with millstone grit dressings and a Westmorland slate roof. It consists of a nave, a south porch, a chancel and a south vestry, and a west tower. The tower has three stages, a blocked west entrance with a segmental pointed arch and a hood mould, string courses, a two-light window with Y-tracery, a clock face, bell openings with hood moulds, and an embattled parapet with finials. Most of the windows in the body of the church are lancets.	II
Field House; 54.03190°N 2.30323°W	—	Mid to late 19th century	The house is in stone on a partial plinth, with quoins and a slate roof. There are two storeys and three bays, and a later single-bay extension on the left. The central doorway has a chamfered surround and an inscribed and decorated lintel. The window above the doorway and those in the right bay are sashes with moulded surrounds, and the windows in the left bay are mullioned with two lights. At the rear is an earlier window with a chamfered surround.	II
Telephone kiosk 54.03599°N 2.30050°W		1935	The K6 type telephone kiosk was designed by Giles Gilbert Scott. Constructed in cast iron with a square plan and a dome, it has three unperforated crowns in the top panels.	II
