= Listed buildings in Scarborough (Central Ward) =

Central Ward is a ward in the town of Scarborough, North Yorkshire, England. It contains two listed buildings that are recorded in the National Heritage List for England. Of these, one is listed at Grade II*, the middle of the three grades, and the other is at Grade II, the lowest grade. The ward is to the west of the main commercial part of the town, and is mostly residential. The listed buildings consist of a converted windmill and a church.

== Key ==
Grade	Criteria
II*	Particularly important buildings of more than special interest
II	Buildings of national importance and special interest

== Buildings ==
Name and location	Photograph	Date	Notes	Grade
The Old Corn Mill; 54.28000°N 0.41021°W		Late 18th to early 19th century	The windmill, a tall tower mill later converted for residential use, is in brick on a stone plinth. It is tapering, and has a circular plan and six storeys. Steps lead up to the doorway that has a segmental brick arch. There is another higher doorway, and the other openings are rectangular and decreasing in size towards the top.	II
Church of St Columba; 54.28593°N 0.41022°W		1926–28	The church was designed by Temple Moore and is built in brick. It consists of a nave with a clerestory, two south aisles and three north aisles, a higher choir flanked by aisles, and a polygonal apse. At the junction of the south choir aisle and southern nave aisle is a flat-topped bell turret.	II*
