= Listed buildings in Scarborough (North Bay Ward) =

North Bay Ward is a ward in the town of Scarborough, North Yorkshire, England. It contains 16 listed buildings that are recorded in the National Heritage List for England. All the listed buildings are designated at Grade II, the lowest of the three grades, which is applied to "buildings of national importance and special interest". The ward is to the south of the centre of the town, overlooking North Bay, and is mainly residential. Most of the listed buildings are terraced houses providing residential accommodation and accommodation for visitors, and the others are a hotel, a pair of cottages, a former coaching inn, a former jail, and a water chute.

== Buildings ==
Name and location	Photograph	Date	Notes
Peasholm House; 54.29070°N 0.40777°W	—	17th century	A coaching inn that was encased in the 19th century, it is in painted brick, with stone footings, a carved eaves board and a slate roof. There are two storeys and three bays. On the front is a pedimented porch with a semicircular fanlight in the tympanum, and on the sides is open scrolled ironwork. The windows are recessed sashes with flat stucco arches, and there are two flat-roofed dormers.
Peasholm Cottages; 54.29056°N 0.40775°W		c. 1800	Two cottages in painted brick, with some stone, and slate roofs. Both have two storeys, the left cottage is lower, with two bays, and the right has three. Most of the windows are sashes, and there are also some casements.
39–49 North Marine Road; 54.28726°N 0.40142°W	—	c. 1820–30	A row of six houses in red brick, with sill courses, a wooden frieze, a moulded eaves cornice and a slate roof. There are three storeys, basements and attics, and each house has two bays. Steps with cast iron railings lead up to doorways with Greek Doric engaged porches, some with paired columns. Each house has a two-storey canted bay window with pilasters, a panelled apron and a projecting cornice. Most of the other windows are sashes with flat stucco arches. At the rear are three-storey canted bay windows.
51–57 North Marine Road; 54.28743°N 0.40148°W		c. 1820–30	A row of four houses in red brick, with sill courses, a wooden frieze and cornice, and a slate mansard roof. There are three storeys, basements and attics, and each house has two bays. Steps with cast iron railings lead up to doorways with Greek Doric engaged porches, the doors with oblong fanlights. Each house has a two-story segmental bow window, and most of the other windows are sashes or casements with flat stucco arches. At the rear are three-storey canted bay windows.
69 and 71 North Marine Road; 54.28793°N 0.40210°W	—	c. 1820–30	A pair of houses in red brick, with a wooden moulded frieze and cornice, and a slate mansard roof. There are three storeys, attics and a basement, and each house has two bays. Steps lead up to paired doorways with Greek Doric columns and pilasters, and doors with oblong fanlights. The windows are sashes with flat stucco arches.
73–81 North Marine Road; 54.28806°N 0.40226°W	—	c. 1820–30	A row of five houses in red brick with grey headers, sill courses, a wooden moulded frieze and cornice, and a slate mansard roof. There are three storeys, attics and a basement, and each house has two bays. Steps with railings lead up to doorways that have Greek Doric porches, with fluted engaged columns and an entablature, and doors with oblong fanlights. The windows are sashes, and there are dormers.
83 and 85 North Marine Road; 54.28823°N 0.40248°W		c. 1820–30	A pair of houses later combined into one, in red brick with grey headers, a sill course, a wooden moulded frieze and cornice, and a mansard roof. There are three storeys, attics and a basement, and five bays. The porch has a frieze, a cornice and a blocking course, and the windows are recessed sashes with flat stucco arches.
87–101 North Marine Road; 54.28841°N 0.40269°W	—	c. 1820–30	A row of eight houses in red brick with grey headers, sill courses, a wooden moulded frieze and cornice, and a slate roof. There are three storeys, attics and a basement, and each house has two bays. In the left bay is a Greek Doric porch, with fluted engaged columns and an entablature, and a door with an oblong fanlight. The windows are sashes with flat stucco arches, and there are dormers.
105–115 North Marine Road; 54.28874°N 0.40315°W	—	c. 1820–30	A row of six houses in red brick, with a sill course, an eaves band and a slate roof. There are three storeys, attics and basements, most houses have two bays and two have four bays. Steps lead up to the doorways, of which two have Greek Doric doorcases, and two have panelled pilasters, and a cornice on console brackets. Most of the windows are recessed sashes with flat stucco arches, two houses have canted bay windows, and above are dormers.
60–84 North Marine Road; 54.28757°N 0.40235°W		c. 1830	A terrace of 12 houses in dark red brick, with a wood entablature, and a slate roof. There are three storeys, attics and basement, and each house has two bays. Steps lead up to Greek Doric porches and a doorway with an oblong fanlight, above which are sash windows. To the right are full height segmental bow windows with tripartite sashes. On the right return is a porch with Greek Doric columns, and in the attic are paired round-headed windows.
86–94 North Marine Road; 54.28821°N 0.40317°W	—	c. 1830	A row of five houses in dark red brick with a slate roof. There are three storeys, and each house has two bays. In the left bay of each house is a Greek Doric doorway with an entablature, and a door with an oblong fanlight, above which are sash windows. To the right are full height segmental bow windows with tripartite sashes, a stucco band, a wooden frieze and a projecting moulded cornice. The left house has a shopfront with a rectangular bay window and an angled doorway on the corner.
Gibson's Hotel; 54.28778°N 0.40189°W	—	c. 1830	The hotel is in painted stucco, partly rusticated on the ground floor, with moulded string courses, and a coped parapet. There are four storeys and a basement, and 11 bays. In the centre is a porch with four modified Corinthian columns, piers at the corners, an entablature and a dentilled cornice. The windows are recessed sashes, those on the middle two floors in architraves, and on the first floor with eared architraves and keystones. On the roof are dormers.
139 and 141 North Marine Road; 54.28961°N 0.40458°W	—	c. 1830–40	A pair of houses in red brick, with stucco quoins, sill courses, a stucco frieze and a moulded eaves cornice. There are four storeys and a basement, and each house has two bays. Steps lead up to the doorways in the outer bays, the left with engaged Doric columns and an entablature, the right doorway has a porch with Doric columns and an entablature, and above the doorways are sash windows.
31–37 North Marine Road; 54.28698°N 0.40122°W	—	c. 1840	A row of four houses in red brick, with a wooden frieze and cornice, and a slate roof, partly mansard. There are three storeys and a basement, and each house has two bays. In each left bay, steps lead up to a doorway with pilasters, oblong fanlights, and projecting cornices. The right bay contains a three-storey canted bay window. The other windows are sashes with flat stucco arches, and above are dormers.
Former jail 54.28546°N 0.40844°W		1855–56	The jail, later used for other purposes, has a perimeter wall of stone faced brick, elsewhere it is in brick, and has a slate roof. At the entrance is an embattled machicolated elliptical arch flanked by arrow slits, and with a carved plaque above. Outside the entrance are three-storey towers with embattled parapets, containing windows with pointed heads, flanked by walls ending in smaller towers. Inside, one cell block remains, with three storeys and fronts of three and ten bays.
Water Chute; 54.29338°N 0.41284°W		1932	The water chute in Northstead Manor Gardens has a concrete base, timber-clad brick walls and a tile roof. The building has two storeys and a rectangular plan, with the chute extending to the north. The launch platform is enclosed by a timber balustrade, and is approached by external steps. The chute consists of two steel rails on steel supports with concrete stanchions.
