= Over Silton =

Village and civil parish in North Yorkshire, England

Coordinates: 54°20′00″N 1°18′26″W

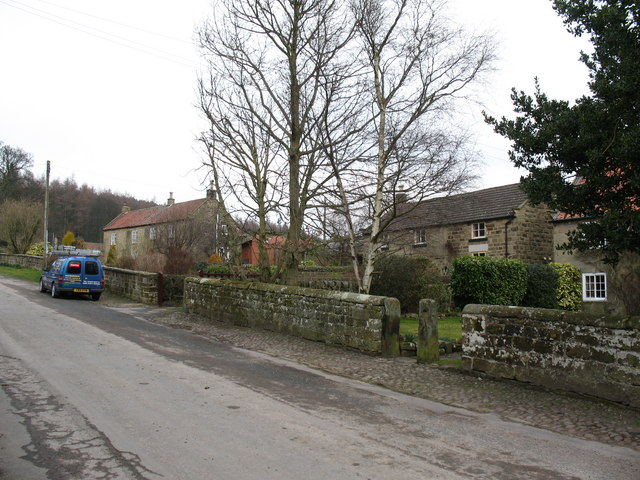
- Village street - Over Silton

- Location within North Yorkshire
- Population: 60 (2015 estimate)
- OS grid reference: SE451932
- Unitary authority: North Yorkshire
- Ceremonial county: North Yorkshire
- Region: Yorkshire and the Humber
- Country: England
- Sovereign state: United Kingdom
- Post town: Thirsk
- Postcode district: YO7
- Police: North Yorkshire
- Fire: North Yorkshire
- Ambulance: Yorkshire
- UK Parliament: Thirsk and Malton

Over Silton is a village and civil parish in the county of North Yorkshire, England, about 6 miles (9.7 km) east of Northallerton and on the border of the North York Moors. The population taken at the 2011 Census was less than 100, and so detailed information is included in the civil parish of Nether Silton. The population was estimated to be 70 at the time of the 2011 census by North Yorkshire County Council. This had dropped to 60 by 2015.

== History ==
The village is mentioned in the Domesday Book as Sileutune in the Allerton hundred. At the time of the Norman Invasion, Over Silton Manor was the possession of Arnketil; afterwards it became the possession of the Crown. The Crown granted the manor as a mense lordship first to the Mowbray family and then to the Malbiche of Kirby Knowle until the 13th century. In 1257, Geoffrey de Upsall was granted demesne land. After this succession followed the Upsall descent until it was sold to the Askwith family who held it until the end of the 16th century. In the mid 17th century the manor was sold to Thomas, Lord Fauconberg of Newburgh. His descendant, Sir George Wombwell sold the manor to William Wainman in 1866.

The toponymy of the name could be either from the Old Norse name Scylfa or the Anglian word, Scelf meaning shelf, both combined with the Old English suffix tun for settlement. The Over distinguishes it as the higher village named Silton.

=== Folklore ===
To the north-west of the village is a cave known Hobbthrush Hall, formerly as Hobby Hole. Local legend has it that a Goblin lived here that churned the local farmers milk into cream at night.

== Governance ==
The village is within the Thirsk and Malton UK Parliament constituency. From 1974 to 2023 it was part of the Hambleton District. It is now administered by the unitary North Yorkshire Council.

== Geography ==
The nearest settlements are Nether Silton 0.7 miles (1.1 km) to the south-east and Thimbleby 1.3 miles (2.1 km) to the north. It is located 1 mile (1.6 km) to the east of the A19 road.

== Religion ==
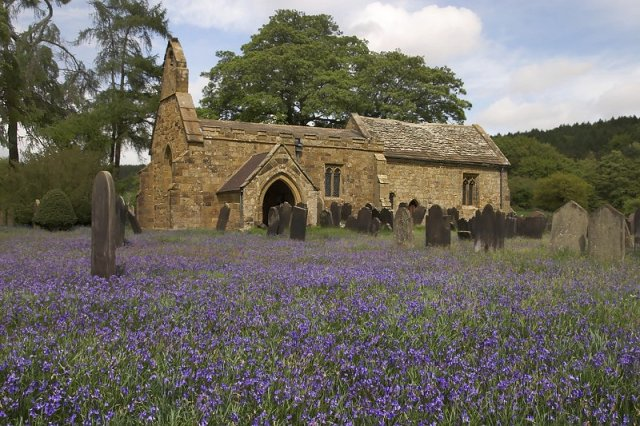
St Mary's Church, Over Silton

St Mary's Church, Over Silton is situated 500 yards to the east of the village. The 12th-century building is grade II* listed, as are some of the tombstones and headstones.

== See also ==
- Listed buildings in Over Silton
