= All Saints' Church, Nether Silton =

Church in Nether Silton, North Yorkshire, England

Coordinates: 54°19′28″N 1°18′01″W

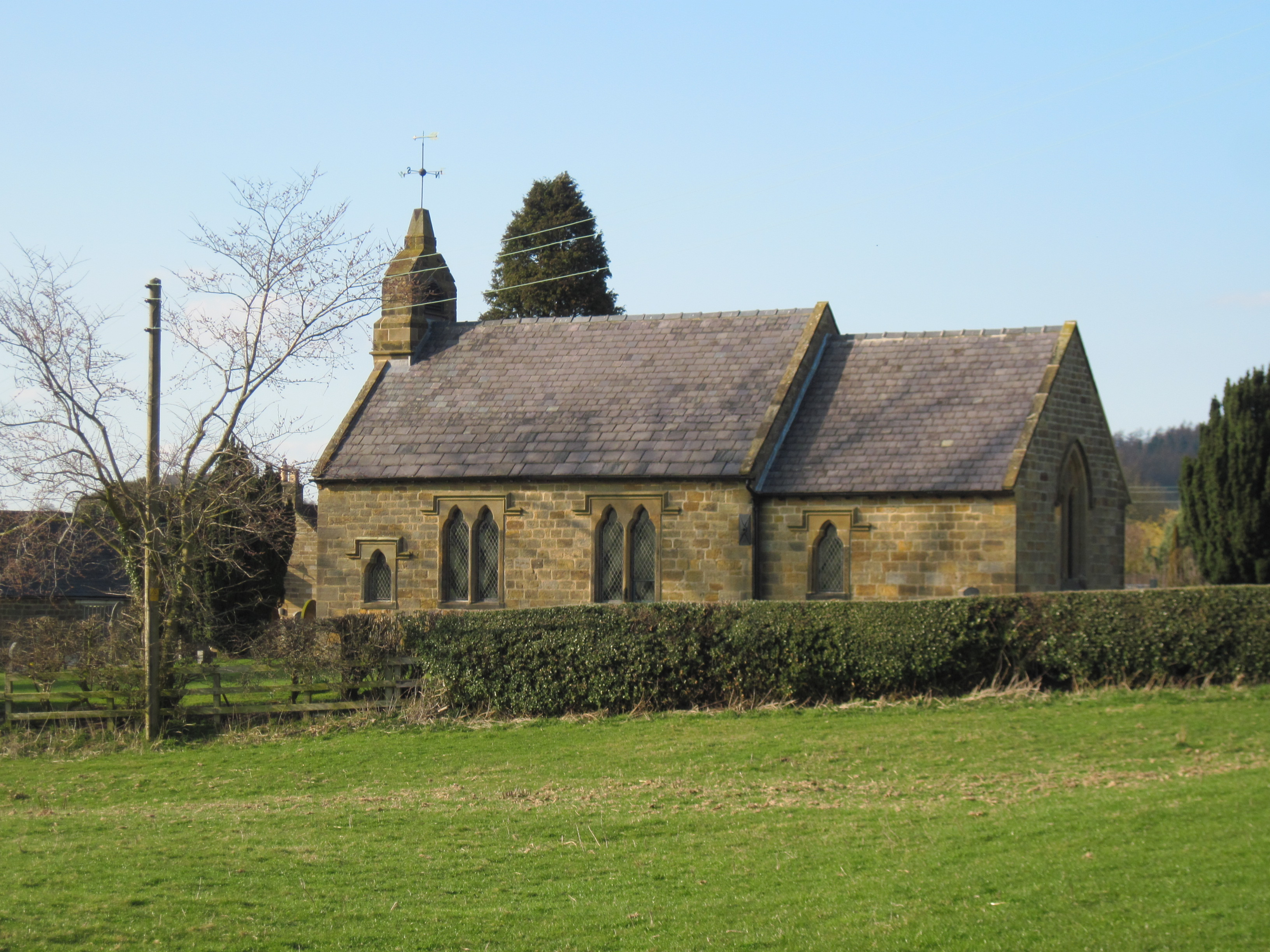
The church, in 2021

All Saints' Church is an Anglican church in Nether Silton, a village in North Yorkshire, in England.

Until 1933, Nether Silton lay within the parish of St Mary's Church, Leake. A chapel of ease in Nether Silton was first recorded in 1786, while the current church was built in 1812. Some of the stones are substantially older, but their origin is unknown. The church was extended in 1873, and was grade II listed in 1970.

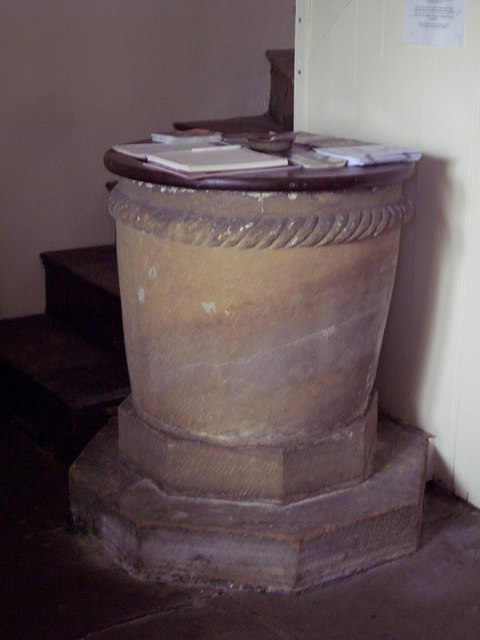
The font

The church is built of stone, with a Welsh slate roof and stone coping. It consists of a nave, a north porch and a chancel. On the west gable is a chamfered bellcote surmounted by a short obelisk. Inside, there is a Norman tub font, with thick cable moulding below the rim. The origin of the font is uncertain but it may have been moved from the church in Leake.

== See also ==
- Listed buildings in Nether Silton
