= Kepwick Mill =

Watermill in Kepwick, North Yorkshire, England

Coordinates: 54.3082°N 1.3066°W

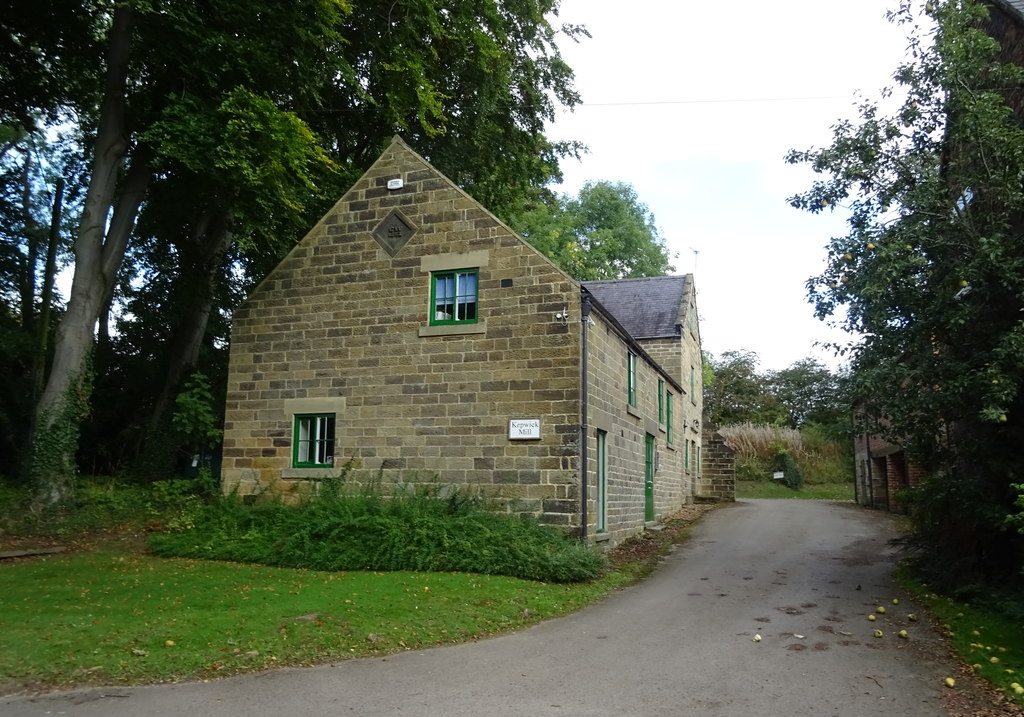
The building, in 2020

Kepwick Mill is a historic building in Kepwick, a village in North Yorkshire, in England. The mill was Grade II listed in 1990.

The watermill lies on Sorrow Beck, probably on the same site as the manorial mill recorded in 1379. The current building dates from the late 18th century, with a two-storey extension to the south in 1882. It was used to grind corn for many years, but has more recently been converted into offices.

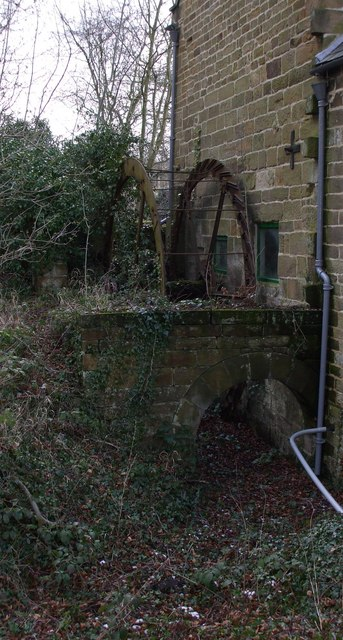
The waterwheel

The mill is built of stone, and has a slate roof with stone coping and kneelers. At the south end are two storeys, beyond which is a gabled cross wing with two storeys and an attic, and at the northeast is a pair of stepped buttresses. Most of the windows are horizontally-sliding sashes. On the south front is a diamond-shaped plaque inscribed "E.W. 1882". There is a large iron and wood waterwheel on the west front, and the corn grinding machinery survives in what is now the reception area.

== See also ==
- Listed buildings in Kepwick
