= Sheepwash =

Sheepwash may refer to:

- Sheepwash, Devon, England
- Sheepwash, Northumberland, England
- Sheepwash, North Yorkshire, England

== See also ==
- Sheepwash Channel, Oxford, England
- Sheepwash Urban Park, a Local Nature Reserve in the West Midlands, England
