= Listed buildings in Kepwick =

Kepwick is a civil parish in the county of North Yorkshire, England. It contains ten listed buildings that are recorded in the National Heritage List for England. All the listed buildings are designated at Grade II, the lowest of the three grades, which is applied to "buildings of national importance and special interest". The parish contains the village of Kepwick and the surrounding area. Most of the listed buildings are houses and associated structures, cottages and farmhouses, and the others include a watermill and a monument.

== Buildings ==
Name and location	Photograph	Date	Notes
Holly House and wall 54.31201°N 1.27968°W	—	1720	The house, which was extended in the 19th century, is in stone, with quoins, an eaves band, and a pantile roof with stone coping and shaped kneelers. There are two storeys, the original part has two bays and a rear wing, and the added bay to the left has a rear outshut. The doorway is in the left bay, and the windows are sashes. The front wall is about 1 metre (3 ft 3 in) high, it is coped, contains a gateway, and is ramped up at the ends.
Stay House and cottage 54.31469°N 1.27562°W	—	Early 18th century	A farmhouse and cottage is in stone, with pantile roofs, and mainly with two storeys and attics. The main front has a gabled cross-wing, to the east is a wing, beyond that is a single-storey wing, and further beyond is a rear wing. The doorway has a fanlight, and most of the windows are sashes, some horizontally-sliding, and there is a three-light mullioned window.
Mill Hill House; 54.30832°N 1.30727°W	—	Mid 18th century	A farmhouse in stone, with a pantile roof, stone coped gables and kneelers. There are two storeys, three bays, and a single-storey extension to the left. The doorway has a quoined surround. In the ground floor are casement windows, and the upper floor contains horizontally-sliding sashes. All the openings have keystones.
Park Farmhouse; 54.31207°N 1.27797°W		18th century	The farmhouse is in stone, and has pantile roofs with gable coping and chamfered kneelers. There are two storeys and four bays, the left two bays projecting slightly. The left two bays contain casement windows, and in the right two bays is a doorway, two-light mullioned windows in the ground floor, and sash windows above.
The Mill; 54.30821°N 1.30659°W		Late 18th century	The mill is in stone, and has a slate roof with stone coping and kneelers. At the south end are two storeys, beyond which is a gabled cross wing with two storeys and an attic, and at the northeast is a pair of stepped buttresses. Most of the windows are horizontally-sliding sashes. On the south front is a diamond-shaped plaque with initials and a date.
Joiner's Shop; 54.31126°N 1.28175°W	—	Early 19th century	A house with an attached workshop, in stone with a pantile roof, inturned kneelers, and stone coping. There are two storeys and three bays. On the front is a doorway and fixed-light windows. In the centre of the rear is a large segmental archway with voussoirs infilled with a door and window, a stable door and windows.
Blue Row; 54.31192°N 1.28017°W		Early to mid 19th century	A row of five cottages in stone on a plinth, with quoins, an eaves band, and a Welsh slate roof with stone coping and shaped kneelers. They have a single storey, each cottage has two bays, and there is a continuous rear outshut. Steps lead up to the doorways in architraves, and the windows are sashes.
Kepwick Hall, service wing and coach house 54.31100°N 1.26759°W		1873–74	A country house that was extended in 1888–89. It is in stone on a chamfered plinth, with bands, a coped parapet, and slate roofs with coped gables and kneelers. There are two storeys and attics, and a south front of three bays, with a slightly projecting wing on the right. The east front has ten bays, and the west front has six bays and a gabled porch with a chamfered surround, and a segmental-headed doorway with a tripartite fanlight. All the windows are chamfered cross mullions. To the north is a three-storey service wing, and beyond that is a coach house with a small courtyard, approached through a large round archway with a hood mould and a keystone.
Gates to Kepwick Hall; 54.31304°N 1.26960°W	—	1888	Flanking the entrance to the grounds are square stone gate piers, each on a moulded plinth, with a moulded cap and an octagonal ball finial. Outside these are low walls with chamfered coping and iron railings, ending in small square piers. The iron gates are in Baroque Revival style.
Howe Hill Monument; 54.30897°N 1.28723°W		c. 1891	The monument has a square base of four steps. Standing on this is a broken fluted column in Portland stone, on a tapering square base.
