= Leake Hall =

House in Leake, North Yorkshire, England

Coordinates: 54°18′31″N 1°20′05″W

The building in 2026

Leake Hall is a historic building in Leake, North Yorkshire, a hamlet in England.

A manor house in Leake was first recorded in 1313. The current building was constructed in the 17th century for the Danby family, with an H-shaped plan. It was leased to the Morton family from the mid 18th century, who used it as a farmhouse, and reduced to a T-shaped plan. The building was grade II* listed in 1986.

The house is built of stone on a plinth, with string courses, and a pantile roof with stone coping and shaped kneelers. It has three storeys and a T-shaped plan, with a main range of six bays, and a central rear wing. On the front is a doorway and cross windows, and in the top floor is a blind oval window with keystones. In the rear wing is the main doorway, that has a rusticated arched surround, and a moulded impost band. Inside, there is an early oak staircase, two ground floors with oak panelling, and one first floor room with linenfold panelling, and a carved shield over the doorway.

== See also ==
- Grade II* listed buildings in North Yorkshire (district)
- Listed buildings in Leake, North Yorkshire
