= Kepwick =

Village and civil parish in North Yorkshire, England

Coordinates: 54°18′42″N 1°16′53″W

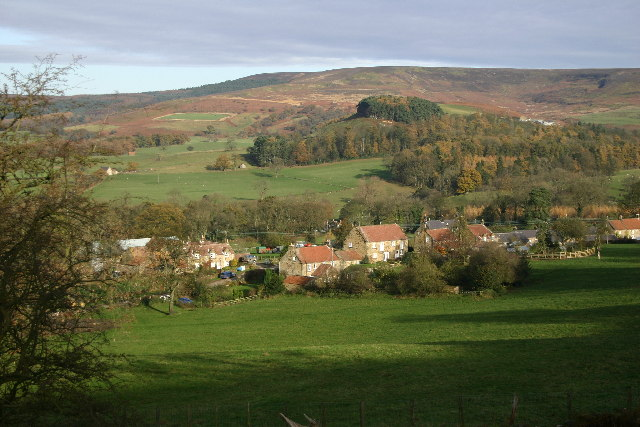
- Kepwick Village

- Location within North Yorkshire
- OS grid reference: SE469909
- Unitary authority: North Yorkshire
- Ceremonial county: North Yorkshire
- Region: Yorkshire and the Humber
- Country: England
- Sovereign state: United Kingdom
- Post town: Thirsk
- Postcode district: YO7
- Police: North Yorkshire
- Fire: North Yorkshire
- Ambulance: Yorkshire
- UK Parliament: Richmond and Northallerton

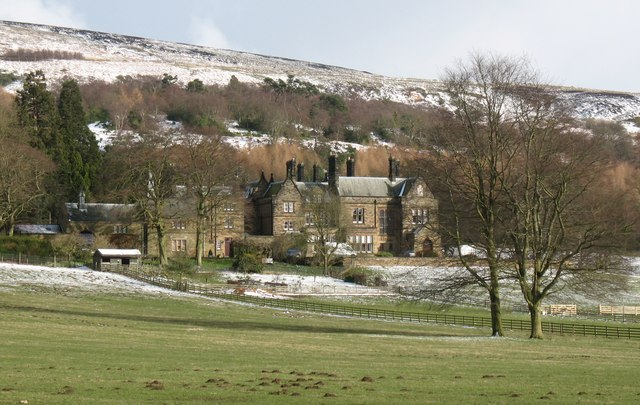
Kepwick Hall, built in 1873 in the revived Tudor style

Kepwick is a village and civil parish in the county of North Yorkshire, England, on the North York Moors and near the A19. The population according to the 2011 Census was fewer than 100 and, whilst the details are included in the civil parish of Nether Silton, North Yorkshire County Council estimated the population to be about 90 in 2015.

== History ==
The village is mentioned twice in the Domesday Book as either Chipuic or Capuic in the Allerton hundred. Chipuic or Capuic is translated from Old Scandinavian as meaning market-place. At the time of the Norman invasion the manor was split among Orm, son of Gamil, Arnketil and Gillemicel. Afterwards some of the land remained with the Crown but some was granted to Hugh, son of Baldric as the main tenant. Until the 13th century the lands were granted to the Mowbray family, who installed mesne lordships to the Nevill and Malbiche families. The manor then passed to Nicholas de Punchardon, who in turn sold to Ingram Knout around 1316. After the Knout family ran into financial trouble, Margaret Knout married into the Lepton family to retain some of the land, with other parts being owned by the Bransby family at the start of the 15th century. When the Lepton family also ran into financial problems, they sold their land to Thomas, Lord Fauconberg of Newburgh in 1640 and they retained this land until 1808.

Remnants of the quarrying of limestone, sandstone and ironstone can be seen on the hills to the east of the village as well as the line of the tramway that connected them to the lime kilns. The tramway was not used after 1890. The remains of those Lime Kilns to the west of the village are designated a scheduled ancient monument.

There a chapel dedicated to St Margaret was built around 1300 but it disappeared at the time of the reformation. A private chapel was built in 1894 by the local landowner where Wesleyans held services. This has since passed into private hands.

== Governance ==
The village is in the Richmond and Northallerton UK Parliamentary constituency. From 1974 to 2023 it was part of the Hambleton District, it is now administered by the unitary North Yorkshire Council.

== Geography ==
The nearest settlements are Nether Silton 1.1 miles (1.8 km) to the north-east and Cowesby 0.7 miles (1.1 km) to the south-east. The A19 road lies 2.2 miles (3.5 km) to the west. At the east end of the village Eller Beck runs off the Kepwick Hall Estate to join the Marl Pits Beck to the north. They form part of the Cod Beck tributary system, which flows into the River Swale.

The 1881 UK Census recorded the population as 168.

At the end of the road to the disused quarries, to the east of the village, lies the old Hambleton Drove Road, which forms part of the Cleveland Way long-distance footpath.

== See also ==
- Listed buildings in Kepwick
