= Nether Silton =

Village and civil parish in North Yorkshire, England

Coordinates: 54°19′29″N 1°18′01″W

- Location within North Yorkshire
- Population: 276 (Including Kepwick plus Over Silton. 2011 census)
- OS grid reference: SE456923
- Civil parish: Nether Silton
- Unitary authority: North Yorkshire
- Ceremonial county: North Yorkshire
- Region: Yorkshire and the Humber
- Country: England
- Sovereign state: United Kingdom
- Post town: Thirsk
- Postcode district: YO7
- Dialling code: 01609
- Police: North Yorkshire
- Fire: North Yorkshire
- Ambulance: Yorkshire

Nether Silton is a village and civil parish in the county of North Yorkshire, England. It lies 6 miles (9.7 km) east of Northallerton, on the border of the North York Moors national park. During 1870–72 Nether Silton was described as, "a chapelry in Leake parish, N. R. Yorkshire; 6½ miles E of Northallerton r. station. Post town, Thirsk. Real property, £1,702. Pop. 178. Houses, 45." by John Marius Wilson, Imperial Gazetteer of England and Wales.

The name Silton derives from the Old Norse personal name Sylfa or the Old English scelf meaning 'shelf', and the Old English tūn meaning 'settlement'.

== Then and now ==
=== Boundary classification and growth ===
Historically areas were classified into Ancient Counties, alternatively known as Historic counties of England, Nether Silton was within the county of Yorkshire. These Ancient Counties were then separated further, Nether Silton was within the North Riding of Yorkshire. Areas were then separated into Poor Law Union/Registration district, Nether Silton came under Northallerton. Nether Silton then became part of Birdforth, an Ancient District. Then formed part of a Registration sub-District under Northallerton. Then became a Sanitary District under the area of Northallerton. Again, continued to be part of Northallerton under Local government district. Previously part of Leake civil parish, Nether Silton became a parish in its own right in 1866. The only growth in the area was in 1934, an increase of 120 acres (0.49 km^{2}) to 1,658 acres (6.71 km^{2}), through gaining part of Leake.

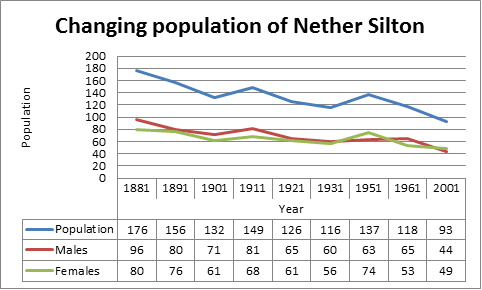
A graph showing the changing population of Nether Silton

From 1974 to 2023 it was part of the Hambleton District, it is now administered by the unitary North Yorkshire Council.

=== Demographics ===
In 1881 the total population occupying Nether Silton was 176, consisting of 96 males and 80 females. The changing population graph of Nether Silton, shows that since 1881 the population of those living in the village has continued to decrease. According to data from the Census the population in 2001 was 93, consisting of 44 males and 49 females. 55% of the population are aged 45 years and above and the mean age of the population is 46.6 years. Therefore, from the demographic statistics, Nether Silton has a declining population and also an emerging ageing population.

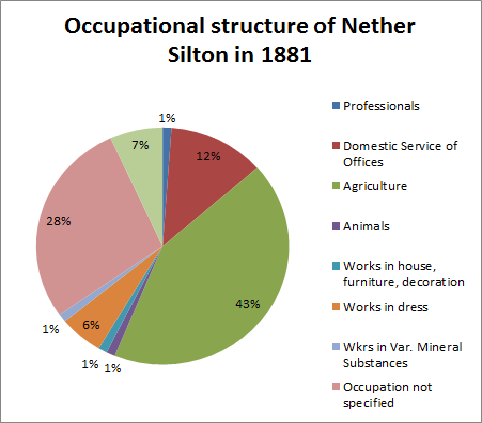
A graph showing the occupational structure of Nether Silton in 1881

This now appears to have all changed with the 2011 census measuring the population at 276.

=== Employment ===
In 1881, 36 out of the 44 males were employed in agriculture, therefore the dominant occupation. During the same period of time, the majority of females occupations are not specified. According to data obtained from the 2001 Census employment was equally divided between extractive and manufacturing industries (agriculture, fishing, hunting, forestry, quarrying, mining, manufacturing, construction, electricity, gas and water supply), and service industries (transport, retail, hotel, catering, property, storage, public administration and defence, finance, communication, education, health and social work). Agriculture is now grouped under manufacturing industries so the number of those employed in agriculture is unknown. But with the area's history of agriculture dominating employment for males it is probable that agriculture is an employer to some extent in Nether Silton. Therefore, when summarising the 2001 census data, it would be correct to say that agriculture no longer dominates employment as it did in 1881, as residents are now moving into jobs within the service sector.

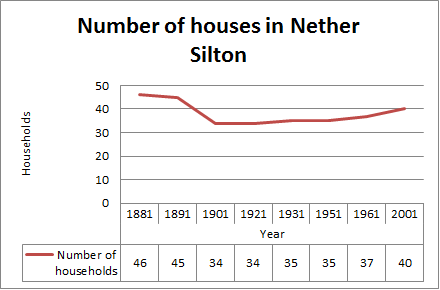
A graph showing the number of houses in Nether Sitlon

=== Housing ===
From the graph showing the changing number of houses in Nether Silton, the number of houses in the village has varied only slightly and remained constantly low. In 1881 the number of houses was 40, and in 2001 the number of houses remained at 40. Although there has not always been the same number of houses in the area, there have only been minor fluctuations in the total number of houses.

== Church ==
All Saints' Church, Nether Silton serves the Leake Parish. In 1812 the church was rebuilt and in 1878 it was enlarged. The altar rails may originate from HMS Dreadnought. The stained glass windows in the church are in remembrance of the Scaife family, who originally came from the area of Thirsk in North Yorkshire and were known as the Mowbray Scaifes. All Saints Church is part of the Imperial War Museum Project. The adjacent photo shows a Roll of Honour, War Memorial on display at the church, for those who served in the First World War and Second World War.

== Education ==
There used to be a school in Nether Silton, but it closed in the 1980s due to lack of pupils. Osmotherley County Primary School in Northallerton is the closest primary school, 3 miles (4.8 km) away and the closest secondary school is Allertonshire School 6 miles (9.7 km) away, located in Northallerton.

== Public transport ==
The closest railway stations are Northallerton railway station, 6 miles (9.7 km), and Thirsk railway station, 7.5 miles (12.1 km) away. There is no public bus that serves the area.

== See also ==
- Listed buildings in Nether Silton
