= Listed buildings in Thimbleby, North Yorkshire =

Thimbleby is a civil parish in the county of North Yorkshire, England. It contains 12 listed buildings that are recorded in the National Heritage List for England. All the listed buildings are designated at Grade II, the lowest of the three grades, which is applied to "buildings of national importance and special interest". The parish contains the village of Thimbleby and the surrounding countryside. Three of the listed buildings are associated with Thimbleby Hall, and the others are houses and farmhouses, most of them in the village.

== Buildings ==
Name and location	Photograph	Date	Notes
Middle Farmhouse; 54.35192°N 1.30895°W	—	Early 17th century	The farmhouse is in stone, and has a pantile roof with stone coping and shaped kneelers. There are two storeys and three bay, and a single-storey extension on the left. The doorway is on the right of the extension, with a casement window to its left. On the main range is a small fire window, to the right are two four-light mullioned windows, and the upper floor contains three casement windows.
North Webstone House and Webstone House; 54.35148°N 1.30937°W	—	Early 17th century	Two houses in stone with a tile roof, stone coping and shaped kneelers. There are two storeys, each house has two bays, and to the right is a single-storey one-bay extension. On the front are three doorways, one blocked. The ground floor windows in the main part are casements, in the upper floor are three-light mullioned windows, and the extension has a horizontally sliding sash window.
North Farmhouse; 54.35710°N 1.30565°W	—	Late 18th century	The farmhouse is in stone, with an eaves band, and a pantile roof with stone coping and shaped kneelers. There are two storeys and three bay, On the front is a doorway with a plain surround, and the windows are casements with large lintels and double keystones.
Coach house and garages, Thimbleby Hall; 54.36070°N 1.29671°W	—	Late 18th century	The buildings are in stone with hipped Welsh slate roofs. The coach house has two storeys and three bays, the middle bay projecting under a pediment. It has a plinth and an eaves band. The middle bay contains a full height round-headed arch with an impost band. On the outer bays are round-headed panels containing sash windows, and above them are square openings with casements. To the right is a single-storey three-bay extension. In the middle is a pier, the central bay has a coped pediment, and the extension contains wagon doors.
Dovecote and barn, Thimbleby Hall; 54.35958°N 1.29915°W	—	Late 18th century	The dovecote is in stone on a plinth, with floor bands, a frieze, an eaves band, and a hipped Welsh slate roof with a ball finial. There are two storeys, an octagonal plan, and at the rear is a single-storey two-bay shelter. The dovecote contains a doorway with a plain surround flanked by rectangular openings, and above are blind round-headed openings. Inside are terracotta nesting boxes. The barn is rendered, with stone dressings, quoins, an eaves band and a pantile roof. It contains a doorway and square windows, all with quoined surrounds.
Lodges, piers, gates and walls, Thimbleby Hall; 54.36008°N 1.30280°W		Late 18th century	Flanking the entrance to the drive are two lodges in stone with Welsh slate roofs. Each lodge has a single storey and one bay, with an eaves band, an embattled gable containing a blind roundel, and a ball finial. The windows are sashes with pointed arches. The southeast lodge has a two-storey two-bay addition with a hipped roof. Attached to each lodge is a quadrant screen wall ending in a rusticated pier with a ball finial. Between the lodges are four rusticated gate piers with plinths, impost bands, friezes with oval medallions, cornices and ball finials. Between the piers are wrought iron gates with spear finials.
West Farmhouse; 54.35183°N 1.32662°W	—	Late 18th century	The farmhouse is in stone, and has a pantile roof with stone copings and a shaped kneeler. The central block has two storeys and two bays, to the right is a lower two-storey two-bay extension, and to the left is a single-storey three-bay wing. On the main block is a gabled porch, and the windows are horizontally siding sashes, those in the main block and left wing with keystones. On the left wing is a French window.
Thimbleby Grange; 54.34775°N 1.32025°W	—	Late 18th to early 19th century	The farmhouse is in stone, and has a pantile roof with stone coping and shaped kneelers. There are three storeys and three bays, and two lower rear wings. The central doorway has quoined jambs, a radial fanlight, impost bands, and an archivolt with a keystone. All the windows have keystones, those in the lower two floors are sashes. The top floor has a blind central windo flanked by 20th-century windows. Inside, there is an inglenook fireplace.
East Cottage; 54.35248°N 1.30848°W	—	Early 19th century	The house is in stone, and has a pantile roof with stone coping and shaped kneelers. There are two storeys and two bays, and a single-storey one-bay extension to the left. The doorway is in the centre, the windows in the main part are casements, and on the extension is a doorway and a horizontally sliding sash window.
Milton Cottage and Tudor Cottage; 54.35266°N 1.30840°W	—	Early 19th century	A pair of houses in stone that have a pantile roof with stone coping and shaped kneelers. There are two storeys and each house has three bays. Each house has a central doorway, the left house with a gabled porch, and over each doorway is a blind opening. The left house contains casement windows, and the windows on the right house are sashes, those in the upper floor horizontally sliding.
Woodlands; 54.35121°N 1.31038°W	—	Early 19th century	The house is in stone and has a pantile roof with stone coping. There are two storeys, a two-bay block, and a lower three-bay recessed block on the left. The doorway is in the centre, and the windows are casements.
Washbeck House; 54.35247°N 1.30911°W	—	Early to mid-19th century	The house is in stone, with chamfered quoins, and a pantile roof with stone coping and plain kneelers. Thee are two storeys and three bays. The doorway is in the centre, and the windows are sashes.
