= The Three Tuns, Osmotherley =

Pub in Osmotherley, North Yorkshire, England

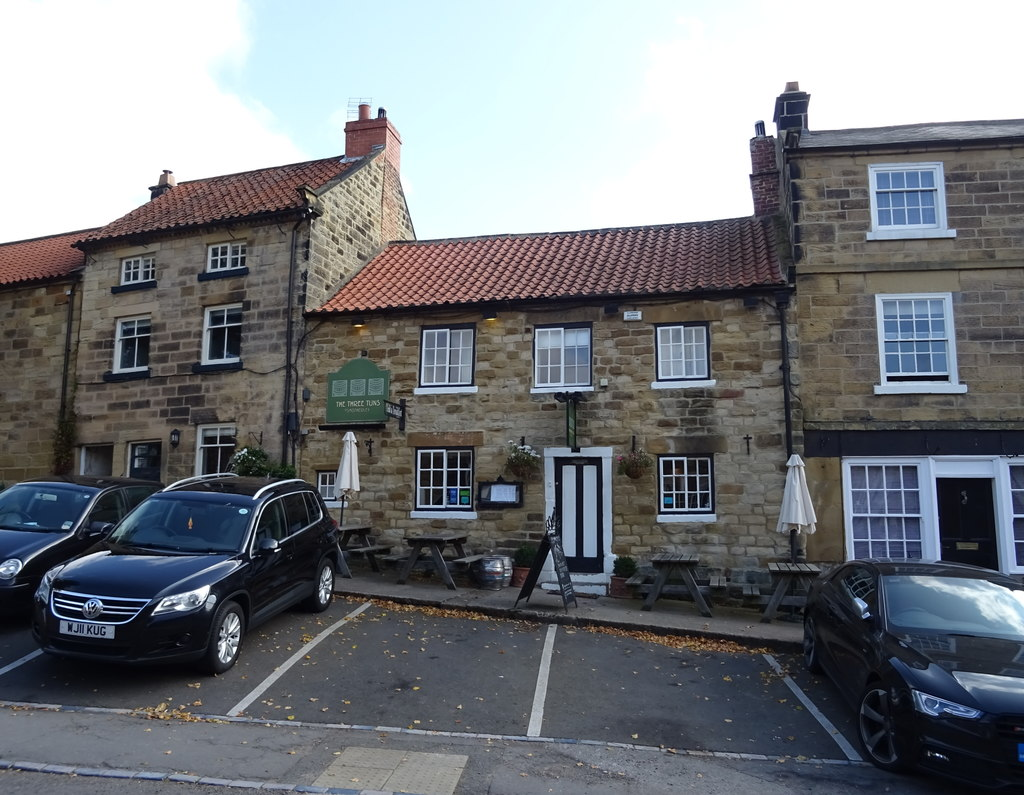
The pub, in 2020

The Three Tuns is a historic pub in Osmotherley, North Yorkshire, a village in England.

The pub was built in the 17th century, and the building was altered early in the 19th century. The building was grade II listed in 1970. In 2018, the pub was put up for sale for £700,000, at which time it had a bar, restaurant, snug, four hotel bedrooms, and a beer garden. In 2021, The Yorkshireman recommended it as one of the ten best beer gardens in the North York Moors, and described the pub as "no frills" but as having a "homely, cottage-like air".

The pub is built of stone on a plinth, and has a pantile roof with a shaped kneeler and stone coping on the right. The central doorway has a plain surround on shaped plinths, on the left is a fire window, and the other windows are horizontally-sliding sashes.

== See also ==
- Listed buildings in Osmotherley, North Yorkshire
