= Cod Beck Reservoir =

Reservoir in North Yorkshire, England

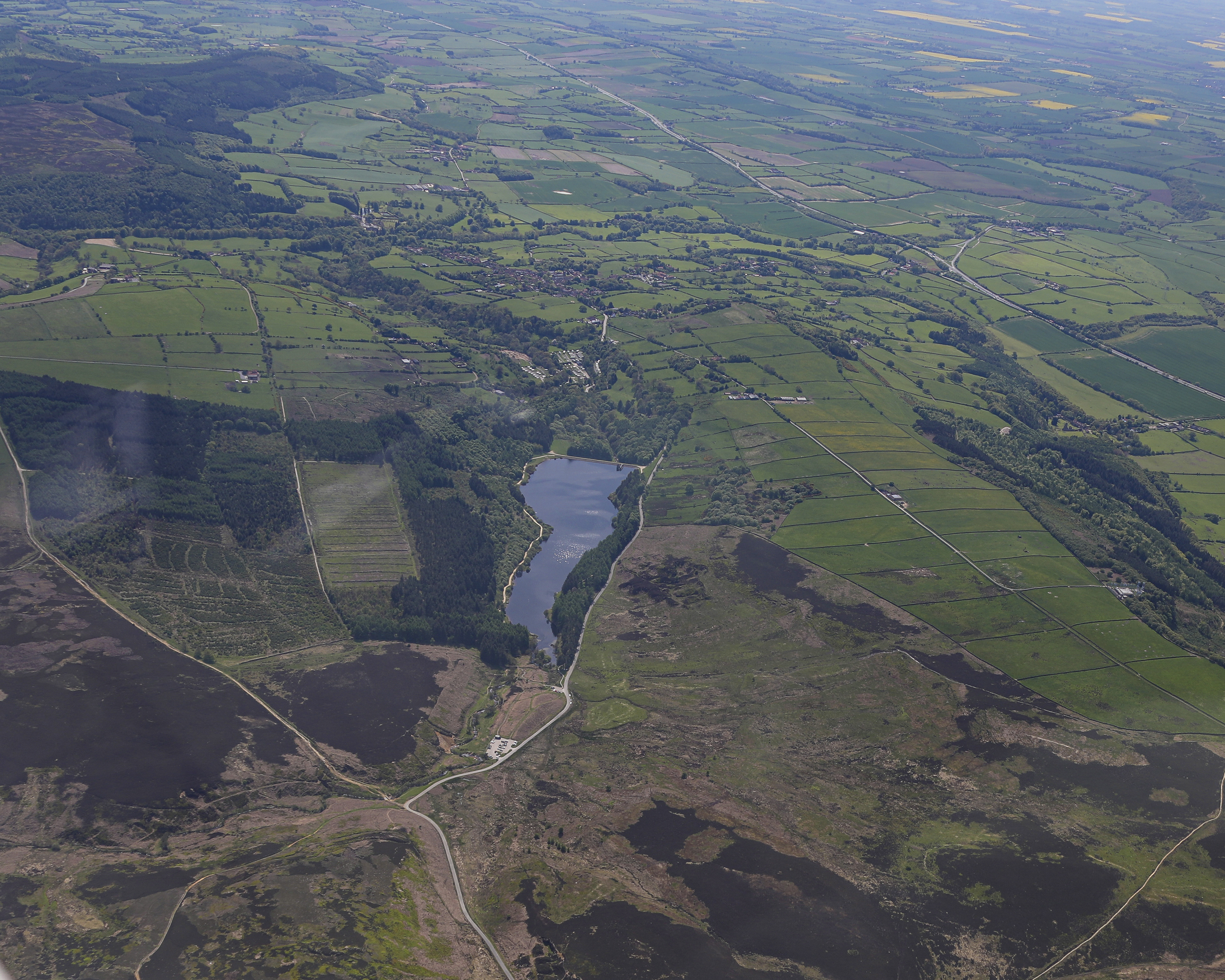
- Cod Beck Reservoir from the air

- Location within North Yorkshire
- Location: North Yorkshire
- Coordinates: 54°22′55″N 1°17′12″W
- Type: reservoir
- Primary inflows: Cod Beck
- Primary outflows: Cod Beck
- Basin countries: United Kingdom
- Surface area: 10 ha (25 acres)
- Water volume: 115,000 m^{3} (25,000,000 imp gal; 93 acre⋅ft)

Cod Beck Reservoir is a man-made lake situated within the North York Moors National Park, near the village of Osmotherley in the English county of North Yorkshire. The reservoir is named after Cod Beck, which is the small river that fills it.

== History ==
The building of the reservoir was started in 1948 with final completion in 1953. The dam head height is listed as being 24.4 m (80 ft) and an old pit at Crathorne was re-opened in 1950 to supply clay to line the dam head.

The treatment works was closed down in 2006 after the deterioration of the quality of the water from the moorland and the presence of Cryptosporidium; water is now supplied to Northallerton and Thirsk, and to Osmotherley village, from Thornton Steward Reservoir. Cod Beck Reservoir now operates as a compensation reservoir to maintain flow into the downstream reaches of Cod Beck and as such, it is still operated and maintained by Yorkshire Water.

The reservoir is surrounded by woodland and just upstream is the local beauty spot called Sheepwash. Because of its position at the north of the North York Moors, the site attracts many visitors from Darlington and Teesside.

Cod Beck Reservoir is open to the public for walking and enjoyment of the countryside but campfires, camping, illegal raves, fishing and swimming are prohibited for public safety.

== Ecology ==
Cod Beck Reservoir is recognised as being important to toads. Common Toads hibernate on the moorland and have been subject to death on the road that runs alongside the reservoir. Volunteers go out on mild wet nights in February for a two to four-week period to rescue the toads. Yorkshire Water have similarly said that they will only release water in drought conditions if it is of benefit to the environment downstream to alleviate the plight of the toads.

Cod Beck also supports Brown Trout, Grayling, Bullhead, Eel, Stone loach, Minnow and Lamphrey. Evidence of Otters has also been noted.

== Facilities ==
- Picnic area
- Car park nearby

== Activities ==
- Walking – a circular path around the reservoir provides a 45-minute walk
- Private canoeing
- The Lyke Wake Walk starts opposite the northern end of the reservoir
