= Kepwick Hall =

Building in Kepwick, North Yorkshire, England

Coordinates: 54.3110°N 1.2676°W

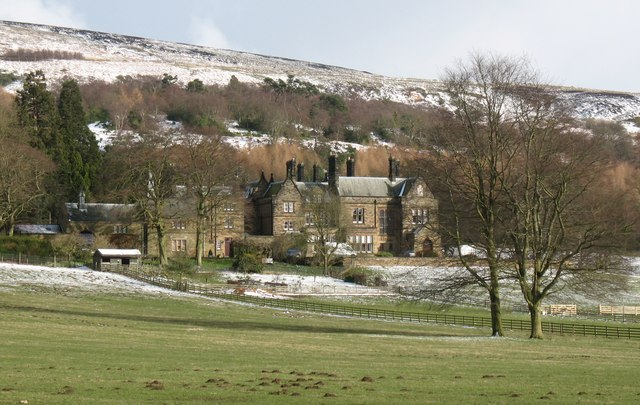
The building, in 2008

Kepwick Hall is a historic building in Kepwick, a village in North Yorkshire, in England.

The building lies on the site of the manor house, first recorded in 1379. The current building was constructed in 1873, to a design by Robert Johnson Goodacre. He also designed a large extension, which was completed in 1889, and there was some alterations in about 1930. The country house was grade II listed in 1990, along with the attached service wing and coach house. The Victoria County History describes it as "a fine mansion". In 2002, it was owned by Peter Stephenson, chair of Able UK, who was shot in the head after confronting three people in the grounds.

The building is constructed of stone on a chamfered plinth, with bands, a coped parapet, and slate roofs with coped gables and kneelers. It has two storeys and attics, and a south front of three bays, with a slightly projecting wing on the right. The east front has ten bays, and the west front has six bays and a gabled porch with a chamfered surround, and a segmental-headed doorway with a tripartite fanlight. All the windows are chamfered cross mullions. To the north is a three-storey service wing, and beyond that is a coach house with a small courtyard, approached through a large round archway with a hood mould and a keystone.

== See also ==
- Listed buildings in Kepwick
