= Listed buildings in Nether Silton =

Nether Silton is a civil parish in the county of North Yorkshire, England. It contains 15 listed buildings that are recorded in the National Heritage List for England. All the listed buildings are designated at Grade II, the lowest of the three grades, which is applied to "buildings of national importance and special interest". The parish contains the village of Nether Silton and the surrounding countryside. The listed buildings include houses and associated structures, cottages, farmhouses, an inscribed standing stone, a workshop, a limekiln, a church and a telephone kiosk.

== Buildings ==
Name and location	Photograph	Date	Notes
Silton Hall; 54.32475°N 1.30298°W	—	Late 16th century	The house, which has been much extended, is in stone with pantile roofs, and two storeys. The south front has three bays and a linking bay, a rear wing on the right and a rear range. The doorway has an architrave, pilasters, a radial fanlight, an archivolt and a keystone, and above it is a casement window. In the right bay is a full-height bow window. To the left is an octagonal full-height tower with four-centred arched openings, a band, and an embattled parapet on corbels. The right return has six bays, and contains sash windows.
Manor Farmhouse and stable block 54.32405°N 1.29953°W		16th or early 17th century	The farmhouse and attached stable block are in stone, with moulded floor bands, and pantile roofs with shaped kneelers and stone copings. The house has four bays and the stable block has two. Both parts have two storeys, and contain mullioned windows, and doorways with a four-centred arched lintel.
Outbuilding north of Silton Hall; 54.32501°N 1.30307°W	—	Late 16th or early 17th century	The outbuilding is in stone, and has a pantile roof with stone coping and a shaped kneeler on the right. There is one storey and six bays. On the front are carriage doors, and board doors, one with a chamfered surround and a four-centred arched lintel.
Manor House Farmhouse; 54.32095°N 1.28985°W	—	18th century	The farmhouse is in stone, and has a pantile roof with stone copings. There are two storeys and three bays, the left bay later and lower. On the front is a doorway, there is one casement window, and the other windows are sashes, some horizontally-sliding.
Stone pillar 54.32381°N 1.30006°W		1763	The pillar has a square plan, and is about 1.5 metres (4 ft 11 in) tall. On the south side is an inscription written in code.
North Farm; 54.32498°N 1.29936°W	—	Mid to late 18th century	The farmhouse is in stone, and has a Welsh slate roof with shaped kneelers and stone coping. There are two storeys and four bays. On the front is a doorway, there is one casement window, and the other windows are horizontally-sliding sashes.
Blue House; 54.32423°N 1.30065°W	—	Late 18th century	The house is in stone, with quoins, and a pantile roof with stone coping and shaped kneelers. There are two storeys and three bays. The central doorway has a plain surround on plinths, and a fanlight, and the windows are sashes with lintels and continuous stone sills.
Joiners Shop; 54.32447°N 1.30053°W	—	Late 18th century	The workshop is in stone, with quoins, and a Welsh slate roof with shaped kneelers and stone coping. On the front is a segmental-arched carriage door with a quoined surround and voussoirs, and three windows.
Silton Grange; 54.31857°N 1.31312°W	—	Late 18th century	The farmhouse is in stone, and has a pantile roof with stone coping and shaped kneelers. There are two storeys and three bays. In the centre is a doorway with a three-light fanlight, and the windows are a mix of sashes and casements.
All Saints' Church; 54.32442°N 1.30014°W		1812	The church is in stone, with a Welsh slate roof and stone coping. It consists of a nave, a north porch and a chancel. On the west gable is a chamfered bellcote surmounted by a short obelisk.
Forge Cottage; 54.32476°N 1.30042°W	—	Early 19th century	A pair of cottages in stone, with a Welsh slate roof and stone coping. There are two storeys, and each cottage has two bays and a central doorway. The windows are sashes.
Honey Kiln Farm; 54.32788°N 1.28404°W	—	Early 19th century	The farmhouse is in stone, and has a pantile roof with shaped kneelers and stone coping. There are two storeys and three bays, the right bay lower. The doorway has a lintel with a keystone. The windows are sashes, one horizontally-sliding, and the ground floor windows have keystones.
Limekiln; 54.32352°N 1.29027°W		Early 19th century	The limekiln is built in large blocks of stone set in a slope, and has tapered sides. The entry is in an arched recess, there are holes at the rear, and a circular hole on the top.
School Farm; 54.32465°N 1.29926°W	—	Early 19th century	The farmhouse is in stone, and has a pantile roof with shaped kneelers. There are two storeys and three bays, the left bay projecting as an outshut under a catslide roof. On the front is a doorway and sash windows.
Telephone kiosk 54.32467°N 1.30043°W	—	1935	The K6 type telephone kiosk in front of Forge Cottage was designed by Giles Gilbert Scott. Constructed in cast iron with a square plan and a dome, it has three unperforated crowns in the top panels.
