= Osmotherley Village Green =

Open space in Osmotherley, North Yorkshire, England

Coordinates: 54°22′07″N 1°17′58″W

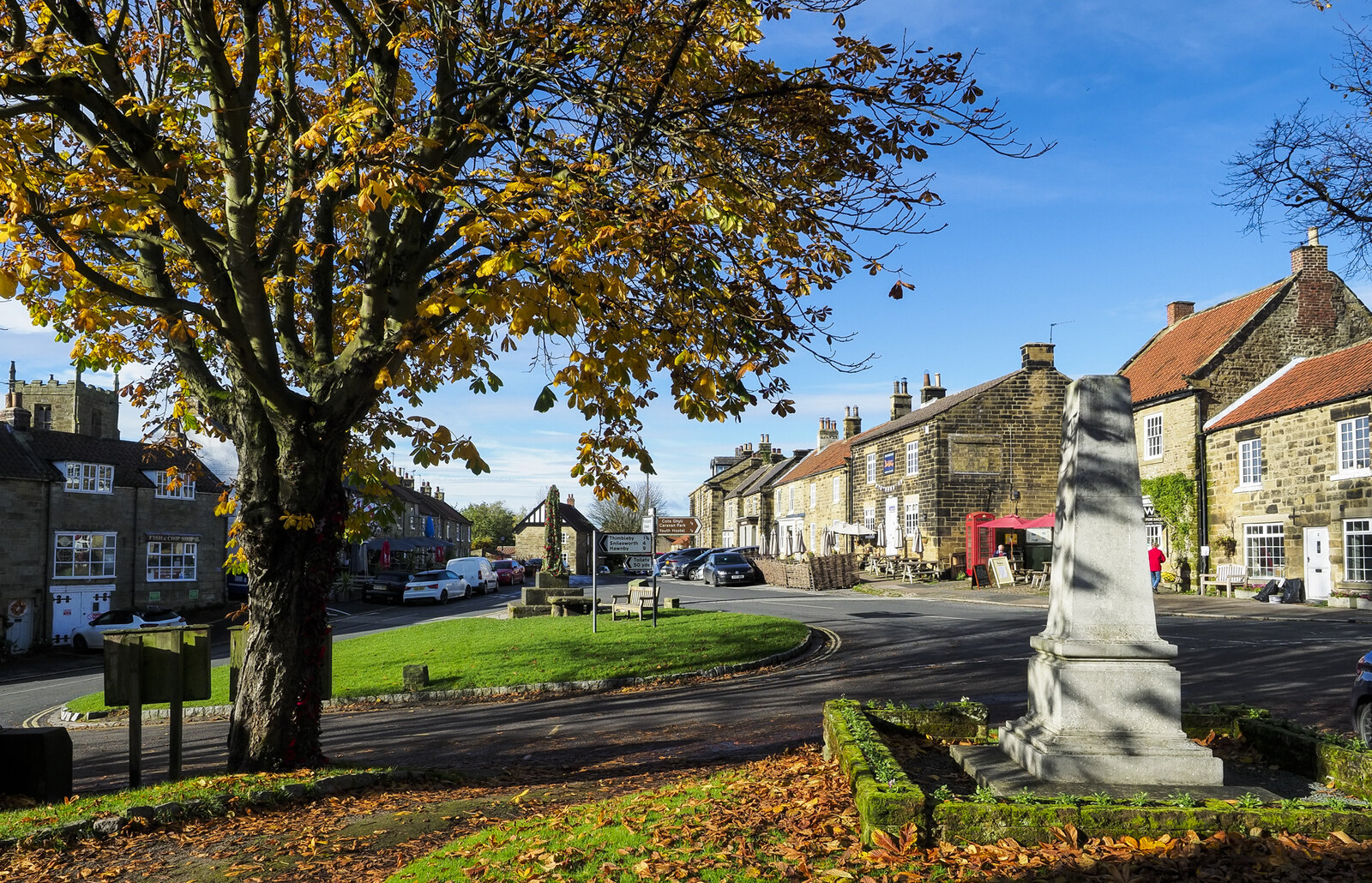
The green, in 2021

Osmotherley Village Green is an open space in the centre of Osmotherley, North Yorkshire, a village in England.

The settlement is centred on its small, triangular, village green, where its three main roads meet. On the green stand a cross and a stone table. A local tradition claims that the cross was associated with a 19th-century market, but no record of a market charter exists. The stone table was probably used as an individual market stall, but has also been described as a stone on which a coffin would have been rested. In the early 1750s, John Wesley preached in the village, and it is said that he did so while standing on the table. Both the cross and table are grade II listed.

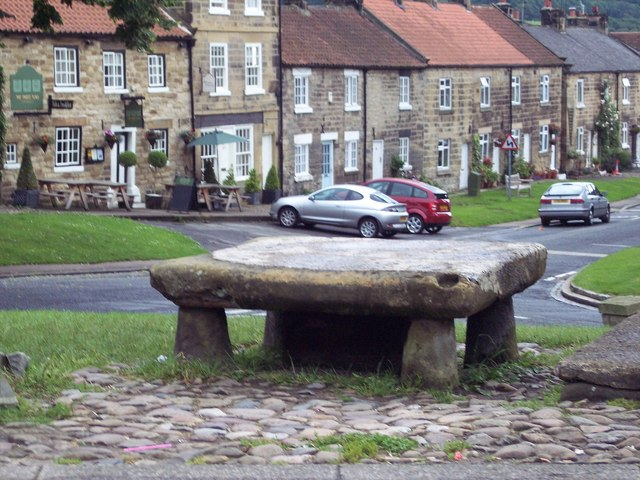
The stone table

The village cross is in stone, and consists of three mediaeval square steps surmounted by a plain 18th-century obelisk. The 16th-century table is also in stone, about 1.5 feet (0.46 m) in height, and consists of a slab on five tapered supports.

== See also ==
- Listed buildings in Osmotherley, North Yorkshire
