= Thimbleby Hall =

Country house in North Yorkshire, England

Coordinates: 54°21′42″N 1°17′48″W

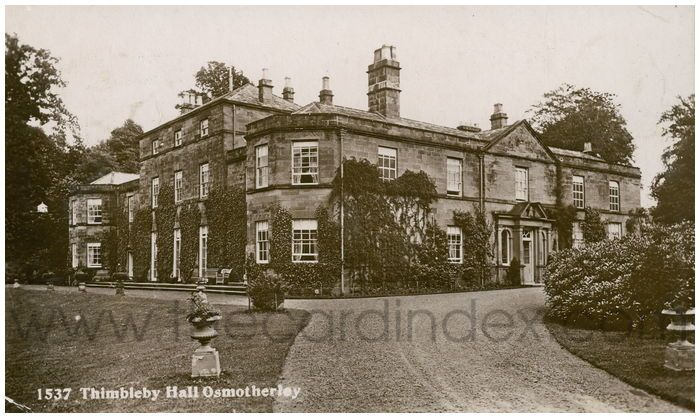
The building, before alteration

Thimbleby Hall is a historic building in Thimbleby, North Yorkshire, a village in England.

In the late 12th century, Bishop Hugh Pudsey granted Thimbleby Hall to his steward Philip Colville, after which it remained in the Colville family until 1418, when Sir John Colville was executed for treason at York. The estate then passed via the Wandesfords to the Peirse family of Hutton Bonville.

The Peirse family built the present Georgian hall, which was extended in Victorian and Edwardian times, it was mainly used as a shooting lodge by the family. In the 1920s the hall was reduced in size, when a complete storey was removed from the centre block. It became a grade II listed building in 1953. A major restoration took place in the 1980s with listed building consent.

In 2005, the hall along with the 3,000 acre estate was sold to Andrea Shelley (b. 1961) and her husband Andrew (b. 1960), Andrea is the eldest child of the late Sir Ken Morrison, the Yorkshire entrepreneur who created the Morrisons supermarket empire, Andrea and her siblings William Morrison and Eleanor Kernighan are reported by The Sunday Times to be worth approximately £933 million. The present owners further renovated the hall, adding a wing and garages in 2011. In March 2011 it was delisted.

Throughout its long history, the Thimbleby Estate has always remained in private ownership. To this day it is still a working estate, including grouse moors, a simulated shooting business, forestry and farming.

== Architecture ==
=== Hall ===
The house, built in the late Georgian period, is constructed of stone. It has a three-bay pedimented gable, while the outer bays are canted. There is a porch to the side, supported by pairs of Tuscan order pillars. Inside, it has five reception rooms, five bedrooms and three bathrooms. The south wing is divided from the rest of the property but in the same ownership.

=== Coach house ===
The grade II-listed coach house and garages is built of stone with hipped Welsh slate roofs. It has two storeys and three bays, the middle bay projecting under a pediment. It has a plinth and an eaves band. The middle bay contains a full height round-headed arch with an impost band. On the outer bays are round-headed panels containing sash windows, and above them are square openings with casements. To the right is a single-storey three-bay extension. In the middle is a pier, the central bay has a coped pediment, and the extension contains wagon doors.

=== Dovecote and barn ===
The dovecote is in stone on a plinth, with floor bands, a frieze, an eaves band, and a hipped Welsh slate roof with a ball finial. There are two storeys, an octagonal plan, and at the rear is a single-storey two-bay shelter. The dovecote contains a doorway with a plain surround flanked by rectangular openings, and above are blind round-headed openings. Inside are terracotta nesting boxes. The barn is rendered, with stone dressings, quoins, an eaves band and a pantile roof. It contains a doorway and square windows, all with quoined surrounds. The structure is also grade II listed.

=== Lodges and gates ===
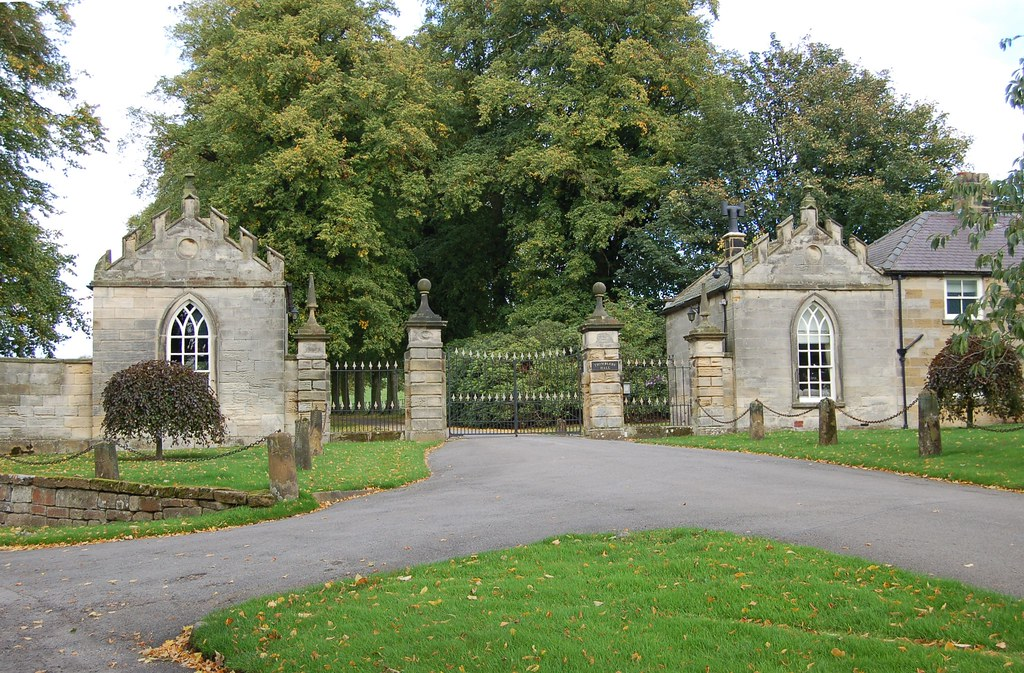
The gate lodges

Flanking the entrance to the drive are two lodges in stone with Welsh slate roofs. Each lodge has a single storey and one bay, with an eaves band, an embattled gable containing a blind roundel, and a ball finial. The windows are sashes with pointed arches. The southeast lodge has a two-storey two-bay addition with a hipped roof. Attached to each lodge is a quadrant screen wall ending in a rusticated pier with a ball finial. Between the lodges are four rusticated gate piers with plinths, impost bands, friezes with oval medallions, cornices and ball finials. Between the piers are wrought iron gates with spear finials. The whole structure is grade II listed.

== See also ==
- Listed buildings in Thimbleby, North Yorkshire
