= Sheepwash, North Yorkshire =

Tourist location in North Yorkshire, England

Coordinates: 54.38787°N 1.27685°W

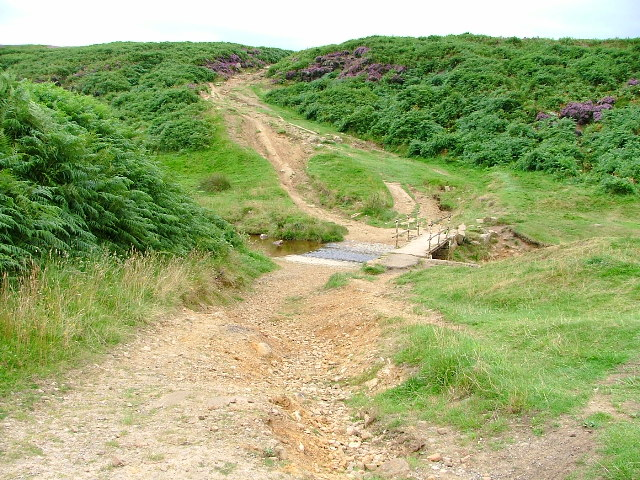
Sheepwash

Sheepwash is a popular tourist spot in the North York Moors, North Yorkshire, England. It is located on Cod Beck which flows into Cod Beck Reservoir near Osmotherley.

The name possibly derives from the fact that shepherds bring their sheep down from the surrounding moorland and wash them in the beck at the ford. The ford across the Cod Beck at Sheepwash was on an old drovers' road known as the Hambleton Drove Road, part of an ancient highway running from Scotland to the south of England. Most of the lower lying parts of the road have been converted into modern roads but the section across the North York Moors is still a rough upland track.

The area is bounded to the west by Scarth Wood Moor, which also lends its name to the National Trust car park at Sheepwash. In 2004 75% of parking tickets issued in Hambleton District were handed out near Sheepwash, to drivers parked incorrectly or on grassed verges.
