= Listed buildings in Osmotherley, North Yorkshire =

Osmotherley is a civil parish in the county of North Yorkshire, England. It contains 57 listed buildings that are recorded in the National Heritage List for England. Of these, one is listed at Grade II*, the middle of the three grades, and the others are at Grade II, the lowest grade. The parish contains the village of Osmotherley and the surrounding countryside. Most of the listed buildings are houses and associated structures. The others include a church and tombs in the churchyard, a stone table and a village cross, a hotel and a public house, a Friends' meeting house, an animal pound, a bridge, farmhouses, an estate lodge, and a telephone kiosk.

== Key ==
| Grade | Criteria |
|---|---|
| II* | Particularly important buildings of more than special interest |
| II | Buildings of national importance and special interest |

== Buildings ==
| Name and location | Photograph | Date | Notes | Grade |
|---|---|---|---|---|
| St Peter's Church; 54.36813°N 1.30010°W | | 12th century | The church has been altered and extended through the centuries, including a restoration and alterations by C. Hodgson Fowler in 1892–93. It is built in stone with roofs of slate and lead, and consists of a nave, a south aisle, a south porch, a chancel with a south vestry, and a west tower. The tower has three stages, a plinth, diagonal buttresses, a three-light mullioned and transomed west window, bands, a clock face, two-light mullioned and transomed bell openings, and an embattled parapet with corner pinnacles. The south doorway is Norman, and has two orders of columns with scalloped capitals. | II* |
| Village Cross; 54.36854°N 1.29947°W | | Medieval | The village cross is in stone, and consists of three square steps surmounted by a plain 18th-century obelisk. | II |
| Stone table 54.36854°N 1.29943°W | | 16th century | The table is in stone, about 1.5 feet (0.46 m) in height, and consists of a slab on five tapered supports. | II |
| The Three Tuns Inn; 54.36818°N 1.29904°W | | 17th century | The public house is in stone on a plinth, and has a pantile roof with a shaped kneeler and stone coping on the right. The central doorway has a plain surround on shaped plinths, on the left is a fire window, and the other windows are horizontally-sliding sashes. | II |
| Tombstone to Mr Weighill and his wife 54.36801°N 1.29981°W | — | 1696 | The tombstone is in the churchyard of St Peter's Church, to the southeast of the chancel. It consists of a short rectangular block with a segmental hood mould and scrolled ends, and has a worn inscription and the date. | II |
| Osmotherley Friends Meeting House; 54.36929°N 1.30191°W | | 1723 | The meeting house is in stone, with quoins, and a pantile roof with shaped kneelers and coped gables. There is a single storey and five bays, and a lean-to on the east. On the front are two doorways, one blocked, and four-light windows, and on the lean-to is a casement window. | II |
| 28 West End; 54.36882°N 1.30135°W | — | Early 18th century | The house is in stone, and has a pantile roof with shaped kneelers and stone coping on the left. There are two storeys and three bays. On the right bay is a doorway and a small sash window in a chamfered surround to its right. On the middle bay is a casement window in each floor, and elsewhere the windows are horizontally-sliding sashes. | II |
| 5 and 7 North End; 54.36896°N 1.29920°W | — | Mid-18th century | Two houses in stone, with a pantile roof, a shaped kneeler on the right and stone coping. There are two storeys, the left house is taller and has one bay, and the right house has two bays. Each house has a doorway and sash windows. | II |
| 10 South End; 54.36743°N 1.29924°W | — | Mid-18th century | The house is in stone on a plinth, with quoins, the remains of a floor band, and a pantile roof with shaped kneelers and stone coping on the right. There are two storeys and two bays. In the centre is a doorway with a quoined surround and a fanlight, and the windows are sashes. | II |
| Chequers Farmhouse; 54.36659°N 1.27017°W | | Mid-18th century | A house, with incorporated outbuildings, in stone with a pantile roof. The central block has two storeys and two bays, to the right is a single-storey wing with three bays, and to the left is a recessed single-storey two-bay wing. The central block has a roof with stone coping, and it contains horizontally-sliding sash windows, those on the ground floor with keystones. In each wing is a doorway and sash windows, some horizontally-sliding. | II |
| Pound; 54.37147°N 1.29839°W | | 18th century (probable) | The pound has walls in sandstone, with quoins and triangular coping. The walls surround a square enclosure, with a narrow entrance on the south spanned by a pair of lintels. | II |
| Swinestye Game Hill Farmhouse; 54.37672°N 1.29767°W | | 18th century | The farmhouse is in stone, with quoins, a floor band, and a pantile roof with shaped kneelers and stone coping. There are two storeys and three bays and a lower bay to the left. On the front is a doorway with a fanlight, and a porch with a stable door, and the windows are casements. | II |
| The Post Office; 54.36869°N 1.29950°W | | 18th century | A house, later used for other purposes, in rendered stone on a deep plinth, with chamfered quoins, an eaves band, and a pantile roof with shaped kneelers and stone coping. There are two storeys and two bays. In the centre is a shopfront with a frieze, four consoles and a cornice. To its left is a six-pane window, and the upper floor contains sash windows. | II |
| Tombstone to John Dick; 54.36802°N 1.29988°W | — | 1769 | The tombstone is in the churchyard of St Peter's Church, to the south of the chancel. It consists of a short rectangular block with a rusticated moulded archivolt and a central double keystone, and an inscription with the date. | II |
| 18 North End; 54.36894°N 1.29874°W | | Late 18th century | The house, which incorporates a chapel, is in stone on a deep chamfered plinth, with a moulded cornice, and a pantile roof with shaped kneelers and moulded coping. There are three storeys and three bays. The central doorway has pilasters, a fanlight, a frieze and a cornice, and the windows are sashes with flat stucco arches. On the left return are steps leading up to the chapel. | II |
| 26 and 36 North End; 54.36930°N 1.29841°W | — | Late 18th century | The house is in stone, and has a pantile roof with kneelers and stone coping. There are two storeys and four bays. To the left is a doorway with a plain surround, and to the right is an alleyway opening with a quoined surround. Flanking the doorway are bow windows, and to the right of the alleyway is a small square window. The upper floor contains a horizontally-sliding sash window on the right, and the other windows are casements. | II |
| 48 North End; 54.36994°N 1.29838°W | — | Late 18th century | The house is in stone with a pantile roof. There are two storeys and two bays. The doorway is to the left, and the windows are casements. | II |
| 64 North End; 54.37037°N 1.29856°W | — | Late 18th century | The house is in stone, with a moulded cornice, and a pantile roof with stone coping and shaped kneelers. There are two storeys and three bays. On the front is a doorway with a plain surround, and the windows are sashes. | II |
| 7 South End; 54.36823°N 1.29903°W | — | Late 18th century | The house is in stone, with a dentilled cornice, and a pantile roof with a shaped kneeler and stone coping on the right. There are three storeys and two bays. On the ground floor are two doorways, to their right and on the middle floor are sash windows, and the top floor contains horizontally-sliding sashes. | II |
| 8 South End; 54.36762°N 1.29932°W | — | Late 18th century | The house is in stone, with quoins, a bracketed cornice, and a Welsh slate roof with stone coping and shaped kneelers. There are two storeys and three bays. In the middle of the left two bays is a doorway with pilasters, a frieze and a hood on consoles, flanked by full-height canted bay windows with a frieze and a cornice. On the right bay are sash windows, some horizontally-sliding. | II |
| 3 West End; 54.36833°N 1.29954°W | — | Late 18th century | The house is in stone, and has a pantile roof with stone coping and shaped kneelers. There are three storeys and one bay. On the ground floor is a doorway with a casement window to the left. The middle floor contains a sash window, and on the top floor is another casement window. All the windows have lintels and keystones. | II |
| Queen Catherine Hotel; 54.36839°N 1.29990°W | | Late 18th century | Two houses, later combined and converted into a hotel, in stone with a Welsh slate roof, and stone coping on the left. There are two storeys and eight bays. On the front is a doorway with a flat hood, and the windows are sashes, some with keystones. | II |
| 20 West End; 54.36876°N 1.30096°W | — | 1776 | The house is in stone, and has a Welsh slate roof with stone coping and shaped kneelers. There are two storeys and two bays. The central doorway has a chamfered surround, and an inscribed and dated lintel. This is flanked by square bay windows, and the upper floor contains casement windows with keystones. | II |
| Table tomb 54.36804°N 1.30041°W | | 1789 | The table tomb to Thomas Walker is in the churchyard of St Peter's Church, to the southwest of the porch. It is in stone and consists of a slab with moulded sides, an inscription and the date. The slab stands on four shaped baluster legs, and there is a vertical panel under the slab. | II |
| 47 South End; 54.36738°N 1.29846°W | — | 1798 | The house is in stone with chamfered quoins, and a pantile roof with stone coping and shaped kneelers. There are two storeys and three bays. Steps lead up to a central doorway with a chamfered quoined surround, and a lintel with a double keystone. The ground floor windows are casements, and on the upper floor are sash windows. The lintel over the middle upper floor window is dated. | II |
| Boville Park Bridge; 54.36580°N 1.31972°W | — | Late 18th to early 19th century | The bridge carries a road over Cod Beck. It is in stone, and consists of a single segmental arch with voussoirs. The arch is flanked by pilasters, and has a band, a coped plain parapet, and octagonal end piers. | II |
| 25–31 South End; 54.36803°N 1.29906°W | — | 1821 | A row of four houses in stone, with quoins, and a Welsh slate roof with stone coping and shaped kneelers. There are two storeys and four bays. On the front are two pairs of doorways, one house has horizontally-sliding sash windows, and the windows on the other houses are casements. On the upper floor is an initialled datestone, also containing the outline of a shoe. | II |
| Paradise Row; 54.36754°N 1.29882°W | — | 1823 | A row of seven houses in stone, with quoins, one quoin inscribed and dated, and a Welsh slate roof, hipped on the left, and with a shaped kneeler and stone coping on the right. On the front are doorways, mostly paired, and a mix of casement windows and horizontally-sliding sash windows. | II |
| 1 North End; 54.36877°N 1.29930°W | — | Early 19th century | The house is in rendered stone on a plinth, with a hipped Welsh slate roof. There are three storeys and one bay. On the ground floor is a doorway flanked by plate glass windows, all set in a 19th-century shopfront with Doric pilasters, a frieze and a cornice. Above it is a bay window with a plinth, pilasters, a frieze and a cornice, and the top floor contains a sash window. | II |
| 3 North End; 54.36884°N 1.29925°W | — | Early 19th century | The house is in stone, with quoins, and a pantile roof with a shaped kneeler and stone coping on the right. There are two storeys and two bays, and a recessed one-storey one-bay wing on the right. The doorway has a quoined surround and a fanlight, and the windows are horizontally-sliding sashes. | II |
| 11 and 11A North End; 54.36911°N 1.29908°W | | Early 19th century | A house and a shop, later a pair of houses, in stone on a plinth, with quoins, an eaves band, and a Welsh slate roof with stone coping. There are two storeys and three bays. The left house has a former shopfront, consisting of a door with a fanlight flanked by windows, the lintels forming a frieze. The right house has a doorway with a plain surround and a fanlight, and a sash window to the right, and the upper floor contains sash windows. | II |
| 12 North End; 54.36875°N 1.29879°W | — | Early 19th century | The house is in stone, and has a Welsh slate roof with stone coping on the left. There are two storeys and two bays. The doorway has a five-pane fanlight, to its left is a bow window, and the upper floor contains sash windows. | II |
| 16 North End; 54.36886°N 1.29875°W | | Early 19th century | Two houses, later combined into one, in stone with a machine tile roof. There are two storeys and two bays. The doorway has a fanlight, to the far left is a blocked doorway, and the windows are sashes. | II |
| 17 North End; 54.36937°N 1.29884°W | — | Early 19th century | The house is in stone, with an eaves band, and a pantile roof with stone coping and shaped kneelers. There are two storeys and two bays. The doorway has a fanlight and a bracketed stone hood, and is flanked by bow windows on stone plinths with friezes and hoods. To the right is a horizontally-sliding sash window, and the upper floor contains casement windows. | II |
| 19 North End; 54.36942°N 1.29880°W | — | Early 19th century | The house is in stone with a pantile roof. There are two storeys and two bays. In the centre is a doorway with a divided fanlight, and to its left is a lower passage door. The windows are sashes. | II |
| 43 North End; 54.37085°N 1.29882°W | — | Early 19th century | The house is in stone, with quoins, and a pantile roof with stone coping. There are two storeys and two bays. The central doorway has a quoined surround, and the windows are sashes. | II |
| 50–56 North End; 54.37004°N 1.29844°W | — | Early 19th century | A row of four houses in stone, with quoins, and a pantile roof with stone coping. There are two storeys, and each house has one bay. On the front are four doorways, and the windows are a mix of casements and horizontally-sliding sashes. | II |
| 58 North End; 54.37019°N 1.29851°W | — | Early 19th century | The house is in stone, and has a Welsh slate roof, with the coped pedimented gable end facing the street. There are two storeys and one bay. The doorway, on the left, has a fanlight, and the windows are sashes. | II |
| 66 North End, walls and railings 54.37063°N 1.29851°W | | Early 19th century | The house is in stone, with a moulded cornice, and a Welsh slate roof with shaped kneelers and stone coping. There are two storeys and three bays. The central doorway has a stone surround with reeded Doric pilasters, an archivolt and a fluted keystone, and a doorway with a blind radial fanlight. The windows are sashes with flat arches and voussoirs. At the front is a garden wall with chamfered coping, iron railings and rusticated stone piers with pyramidal caps. | II |
| 68–78 North End; 54.37081°N 1.29847°W | — | Early 19th century | A row of six houses in stone, with quoins, and Welsh slate roofs with shaped kneelers and stone coping. There are two storeys, each house has one bay, and the left three houses are slightly recessed. On the right of each house is a doorway with a fanlight, one house has casement windows, and the windows on the other houses are sashes. | II |
| 1 and 2 School Lane; 54.36781°N 1.29954°W | — | Early 19th century | A pair of houses in stone, with a machine tile roof and stone coping on the right. There are two storeys, and each house has one bay and a doorway on the left. The left house has horizontally-sliding sash windows, and on the right house the windows are casements. | II |
| 11 South End; 54.36811°N 1.29906°W | — | Early 19th century | A house and a shop, the ground floor later incorporated in a public house, in stone on a plinth, with quoins, floor bands, and a Welsh slate roof with stone coping and shaped kneelers. There are three storeys and two bays. On the ground floor is a doorway flanked by shop windows, and to the right is a board door. The upper floors contain sash windows. | II |
| 13 and 15 South End; 54.36803°N 1.29906°W | — | Early 19th century | A pair of houses in stone, with quoins, and pantile roof with stone coping and shaped kneelers on the right. There are two storeys and three bays. On the front are two doorways, the windows on the left house are horizontally-sliding sashes, and those on the right house are casements. | II |
| 8 West End; 54.36866°N 1.29979°W | — | Early 19th century | The house is in stone, with quoins on the right, and a pantile roof with a shaped kneeler and stone coping on the right. There are two storeys and two bays. The doorway is in the centre, the ground floor windows are sashes, and on the upper floor they are casements. | II |
| 30 West End; 54.36881°N 1.30150°W | — | Early 19th century | The house is in stone with a pantile roof. There are two storeys and two bays. The doorway is at the rear, the ground floor contains casement windows, and on the upper floor are sash windows. | II |
| 33 West End; 54.36855°N 1.30239°W | — | Early 19th century | The house, with a barn incorporated into the house, is in stone, with quoins, and a pantile roof with a kneelers and stone coping on the right. There are two storeys and four bays. On the front is a doorway, and a mix of casement windows and horizontally-sliding sashes. | II |
| 44–50 West End; 54.36869°N 1.30244°W | — | Early 19th century | A row of four houses in stone, with quoins, and a pantile roof with a shaped kneeler and stone coping on the right. There are two storeys and four bays. On the front are two pairs of doorways, and one horizontally-sliding sash window, and the other windows are casements. | II |
| 52–56 West End; 54.36866°N 1.30270°W | — | Early 19th century | A row of three houses in stone, with a pantile roof and a shaped kneeler and stone coping on the right. There are two storeys and four bays. On the front are three doorways, the right two paired, the middle house has horizontally-sliding sash windows, and the windows in the other houses are casements. | II |
| 58 West End; 54.36865°N 1.30294°W | — | Early 19th century | The house is in stone, and has a Welsh slate roof with shaped kneelers and stone coping. There are two storeys and three bays. In the centre, stone steps lead up to a doorway with Doric half-columns, a moulded architrave, a fanlight, a frieze and a cornice. It is flanked by canted bay windows with friezes and cornices. The upper floor contains sash windows with flat painted arches. | II |
| Osmotherley Bridge Millhouse; 54.36481°N 1.29294°W | | Early 19th century | The house is in stone, with an eaves band, and a pantile roof with stone coping. There are two storeys and two bays, and a single-storey single-bay extension recessed on the left. The doorway is in the centre, and the windows are sashes. | II |
| The Vicarage; 54.36960°N 1.29792°W | — | Early 19th century | The house is in stone on a plinth, with a cornice and blocking course, and a Welsh slate roof with stone coping. There are two storeys and three bays. Steps lead up to a central doorway with a fanlight and a hood on brackets, and the windows are sashes with flat lintels and incised voussoirs. | II |
| 44 and 46 North End; 54.36987°N 1.29836°W | — | Early to mid-19th century | A pair of houses in stone, with an eaves band, and a pantile roof with stone coping. There are two storeys, and each house has one bay. The doorways are paired in the centre, and the windows are sashes. | II |
| Blue Cottages; 54.36573°N 1.29796°W | | Early to mid-19th century | Two cottages in stone with Welsh slate roofs. The left cottage has two storeys and one bay, and a roof with shaped kneelers and stone coping. It contains a doorway on the right and a horizontally-sliding sash window in each floor; the ground floor openings have hood moulds. The right cottage has one storey and five bays, and the roof is hipped on the right. On the front is a doorway and horizontally-sliding sash windows, all with hood moulds. | II |
| Boville Park Lodge; 54.36599°N 1.32039°W | — | Early to mid-19th century | The lodge is in stone, the upper floor is rendered, and it has a floor band, oversailing bracketed eaves, and a pyramidal Welsh slate roof. There are two storeys and two bays. The doorway in the right bay has an architrave, the windows are sashes, and all the openings have flat arches with incised voussoirs. | II |
| Greenhills Farmhouse; 54.36600°N 1.28161°W | | Early to mid-19th century | The farmhouse is in stone, with quoins, and a Welsh slate roof with stone coping. There are two storeys and three bays. The central doorway has a fanlight, and the windows are sashes. | II |
| 34 West End; 54.36879°N 1.30178°W | — | Mid-19th century | The house is in stone, and has a pantile roof with stone coping. There are two storeys, three bays, and a continuous rear outshut. The doorway has a fanlight, and the windows are casements. | II |
| Telephone kiosk 54.36868°N 1.29953°W | | 1935 | The K6 type telephone kiosk in front of the Post Office was designed by Giles Gilbert Scott. Constructed in cast iron with a square plan and a dome, it has three unperforated crowns in the top panels. | II |
