= St Mary's Church, Over Silton =

Church in Over Silton, North Yorkshire, England

Coordinates: 54°19′55″N 1°18′01″W

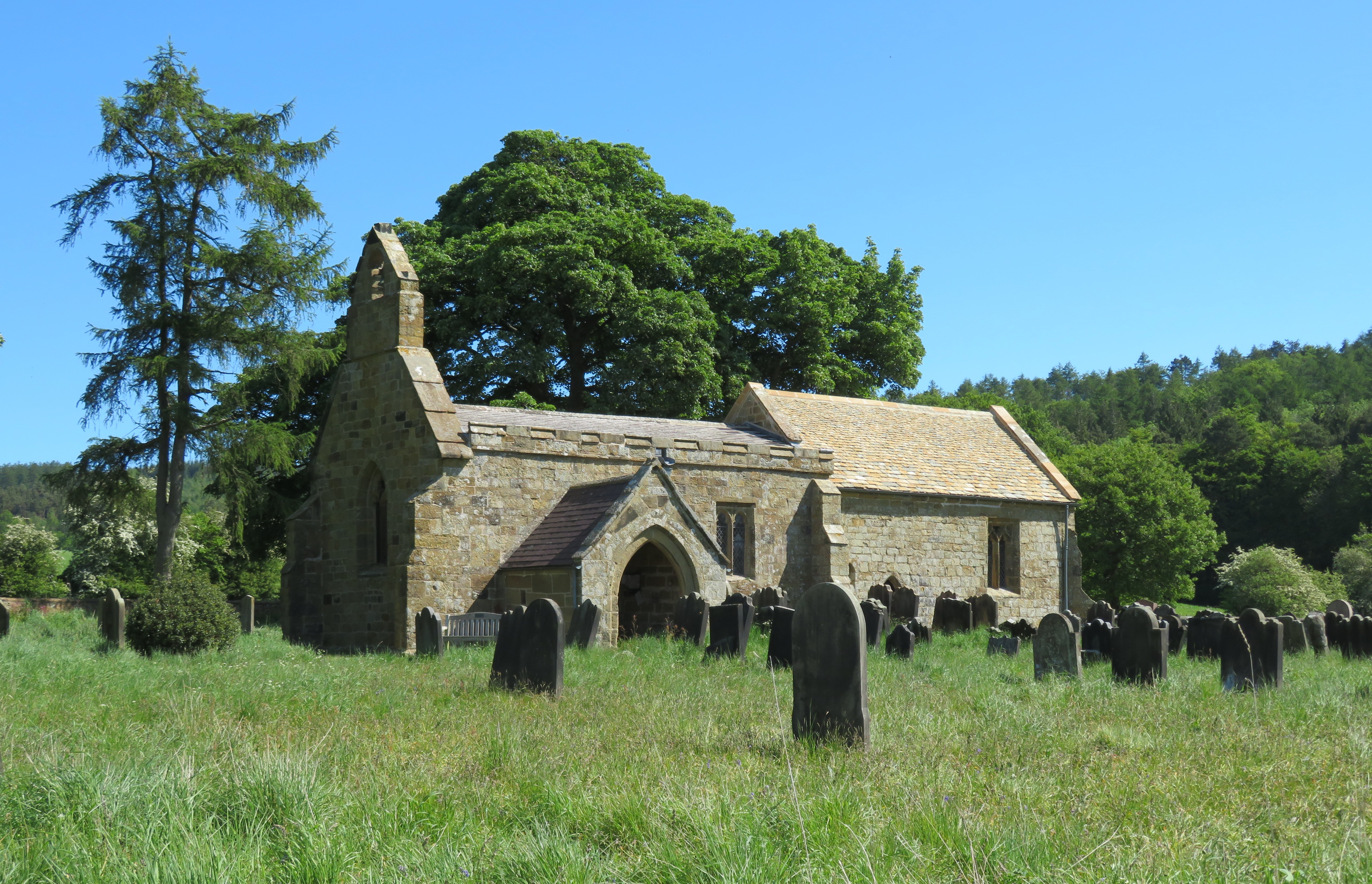
The church, in 2011

St Mary's Church is the parish church of Over Silton, a village in North Yorkshire, in England.

The oldest part of the church is the nave, including the south doorway and chancel arch, which date from the 12th century. The chancel was enlarged in the 14th century, many of the windows were rebuilt, and the porch was also added. The bellcote was added in the 15th century. A vestry was added on the north side in the 19th century. The building was grade II* listed in 1970.

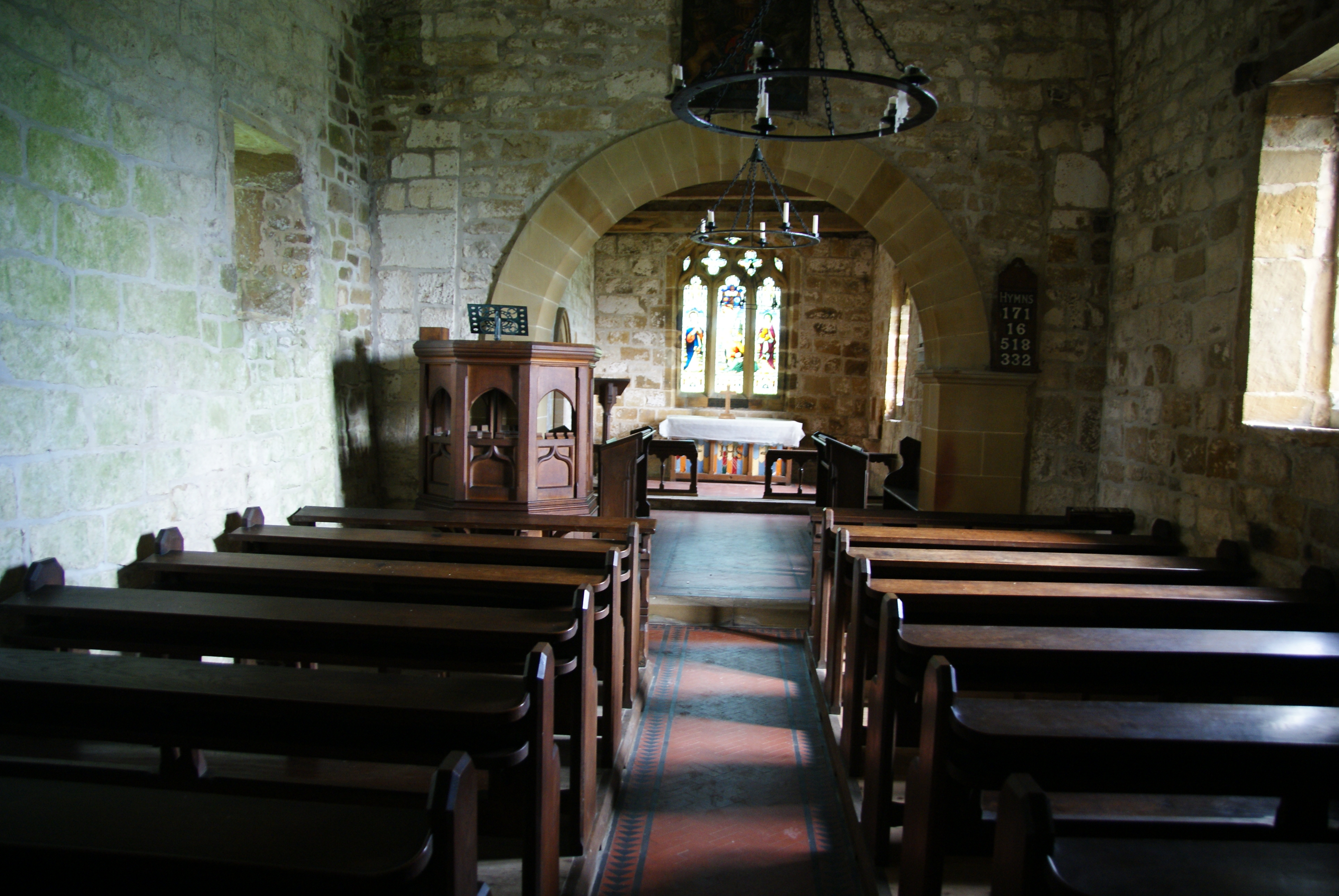
View from the nave into the chancel

The church is built of stone with roofs of stone slate and Welsh slate. It consists of a nave with an embattled parapet, a south porch, and a chancel with a north vestry. At the west end is a tall wide gabled bellcote, and a window with a pointed arch and two lights. The porch is gabled and has a doorway with a chamfered surround and a pointed arch. The inner doorway is Norman, and has one order of shafts, scalloped capitals, and an arch with chevrons and roll moulding. Inside, there is a 17th-century font and painted 18th-century royal arms. The original 12th-century door has been hung on the wall.

== See also ==
- Grade II* listed churches in North Yorkshire (district)
- Listed buildings in Over Silton
