= Listed buildings in Leake, North Yorkshire =

Leake is a civil parish in the county of North Yorkshire, England. It contains three listed buildings that are recorded in the National Heritage List for England. Of these, one is listed at Grade I, the highest of the three grades, one is at Grade II*, the middle grade, and the other is at Grade II, the lowest grade. The parish contains the hamlet of Leake and the surrounding area. All the listed buildings are in the hamlet, and they consist of a church, tombstones in the churchyard, and a house.

== Key ==
Grade	Criteria
I	Buildings of exceptional interest, sometimes considered to be internationally important
II*	Particularly important buildings of more than special interest
II	Buildings of national importance and special interest

== Buildings ==
Name and location	Photograph	Date	Notes	Grade
St Mary's Church; 54.30947°N 1.33577°W		12th century	The church has been altered and extended through the centuries. It is built in stone, and has roofs of Welsh slate and lead. The church consists of a nave with a clerestory, north and south aisles, a south porch, a chancel and a west tower. The tower is embraced by the aisles, and has three stages, a three-light west window with a pointed arch and a hood mould. In the top stage is a triple arcade, the central arch with a bell opening, and the outer arches blind, and above is a corbel table and a plain chamfered parapet.	I
Leake Hall; 54.30879°N 1.33468°W		17th century	The house is in stone on a plinth, with string courses, and a pantile roof with stone coping and shaped kneelers. There are three storeys and a T-shaped plan, with a main range of six bays, and a central rear wing. On the front is a doorway and cross windows, and in the top floor is a blind oval window with keystones. In the rear wing is the main doorway, that has a rusticated arched surround, and a moulded impost band.	II*
Two tombstones 54.30931°N 1.33599°W	—	Mid 18th century	The two tombstones are in the churchyard of St Mary's Church to the south of the church. They are in limestone, on a plinth, and each has a raised aedicule-type panel with a cornice. Above each aedicule is a cherub's head, and on each side are crossed bones.	II
