= St Peter's Church, Osmotherley =

Church in Osmotherley, North Yorkshire, England

Coordinates: 54°22′05″N 1°18′00″W

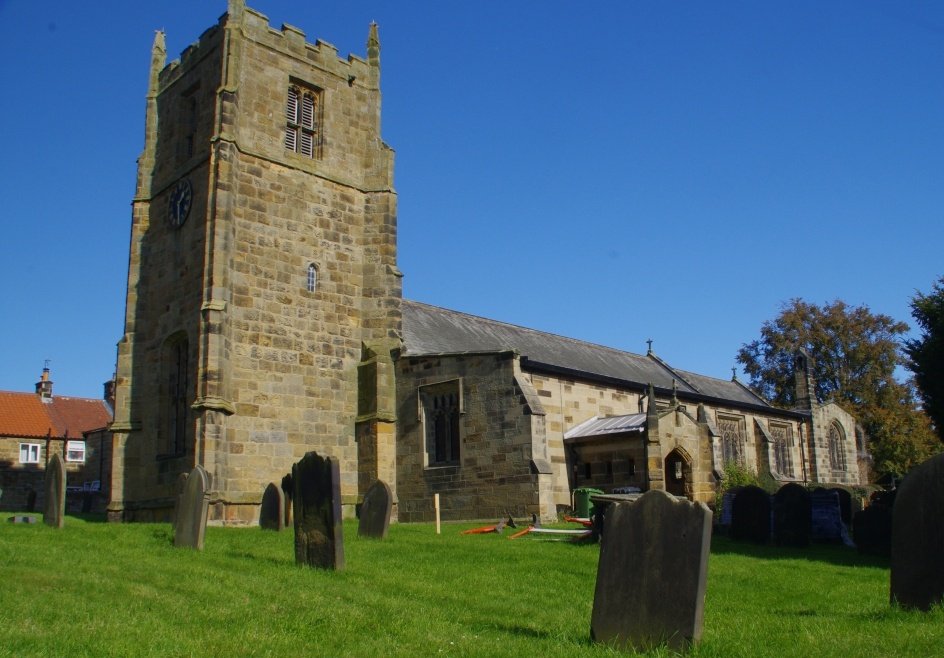
The church, in 2012

St Peter's Church is the parish church of Osmotherley, North Yorkshire, a village in England.

The oldest part of the church is the nave, which was built in about 1190, and retains its original south doorway. The chancel was rebuilt in the 13th century and again in the 14th century, while the tower and the south chapel were added in the 15th century. In the 16th century, a south aisle and porch were added. The church was restored in 1892 and 1893 by C. Hodgson Fowler, who rebuilt much of the structure, the work including the extension of the south aisle, enlargement of the chapel, and replacement of all the windows other than those in the tower. The church was grade II* listed in 1970.

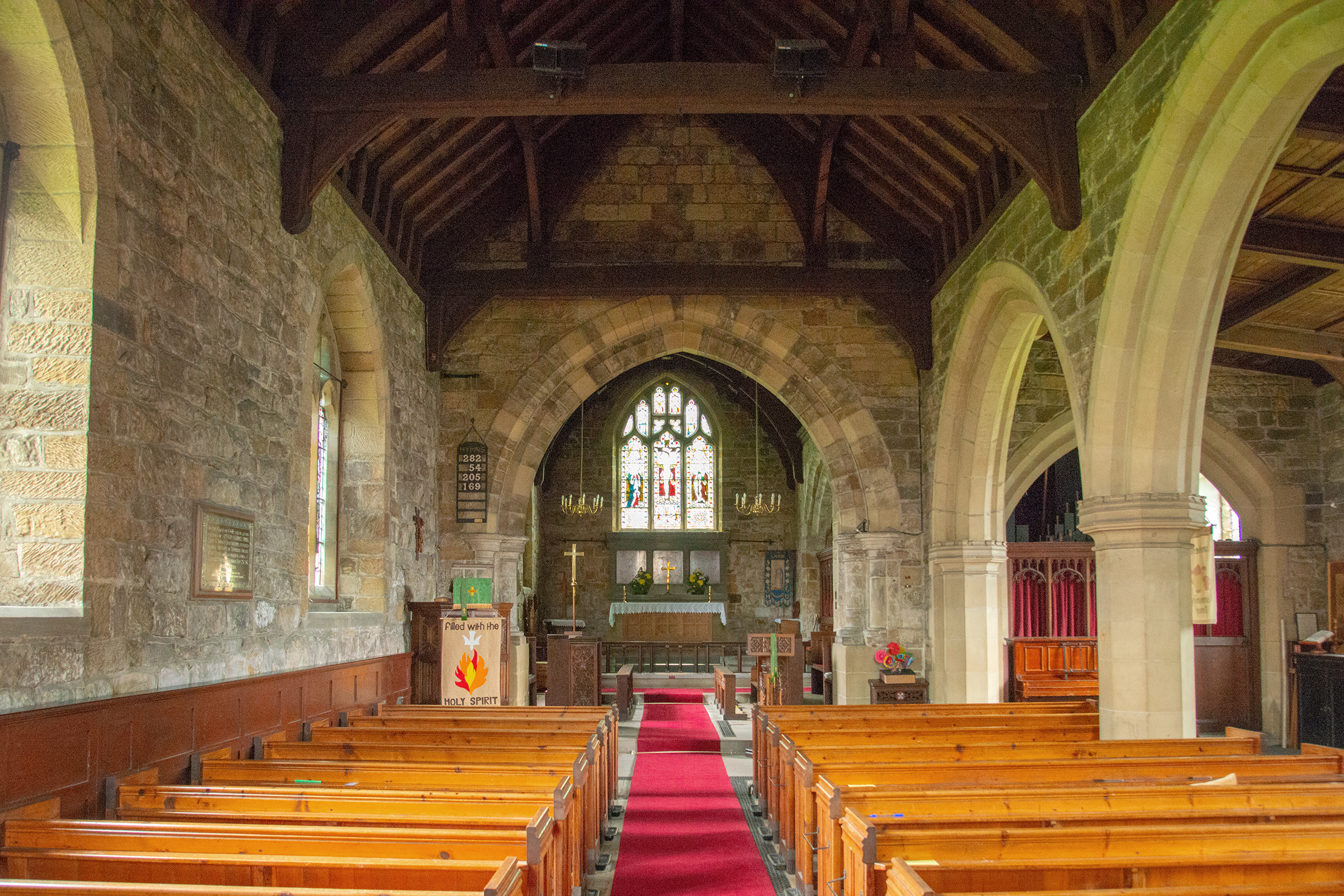
View from the nave into the chancel

The church is built of stone with roofs of slate and lead, and consists of a nave, a south aisle, a south porch, a chancel with a south vestry, and a west tower. The tower has three stages, a plinth, diagonal buttresses, a three-light mullioned and transomed west window, bands, a clock face, two-light mullioned and transomed bell openings, and an embattled parapet with corner pinnacles. The south doorway is Norman, and has two orders of columns with scalloped capitals. Inside, there is an early 12th-century cylindrical font. The east window has stained glass by Charles Eamer Kempe. There is part of an Anglo-Danish cross shaft, and part of a hogback.

== See also ==
- Grade II* listed churches in North Yorkshire (district)
- Listed buildings in Osmotherley, North Yorkshire
