= Osmotherley Friends Meeting House =

Quaker meeting house in Osmotherley, North Yorkshire, England

Coordinates: 54.369°N 1.301°W

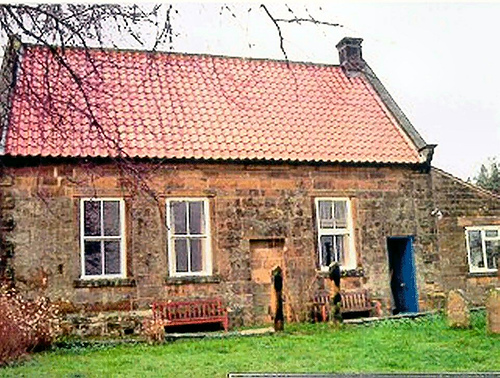
Osmotherley Meeting House

Osmotherley Friends Meeting House is a Friends Meeting House of the Religious Society of Friends (Quakers), situated in the village of Osmotherley in North Yorkshire, England. It is a Grade II listed building.

The meeting house is a traditional stone building, built around 1723 (302 years ago), it is owned and maintained by Teesdale & Cleveland Area Meeting of the Religious Society of Friends (Quakers). It is still used regularly as a place of worship. Meeting for worship is held on the third Sunday of each month at 1500 hours GMT.

The Meeting House and a separate dormitory block are available for letting to organised groups and families, both Quaker and non-Quaker, and can sleep up to 25.

== See also ==
- Listed buildings in Osmotherley, North Yorkshire
