= Listed buildings in Over Silton =

Over Silton is a civil parish in the county of North Yorkshire, England. It contains 13 listed buildings that are recorded in the National Heritage List for England. Of these, one is listed at Grade II*, the middle of the three grades, and the others are at Grade II, the lowest grade. The parish contains the village of Over Silton and the surrounding countryside. The most important building in the parish is a church, which is listed, and most of the other listed buildings are associated with it, consisting of tombstones and a mounting block in the churchyard. The rest of the listed buildings are houses in the village.

== Key ==
Grade	Criteria
II*	Particularly important buildings of more than special interest
II	Buildings of national importance and special interest

== Buildings ==
Name and location	Photograph	Date	Notes	Grade
St Mary's Church; 54.33205°N 1.30026°W		12th century	The church has been altered and enlarged through the centuries, and is built in stone with roofs of stone slate and Welsh slate. It consists of a nave with an embattled parapet, a south porch, and a chancel with a north vestry. At the west end is a tall wide gabled bellcote, and a window with a pointed arch and two lights. The porch is gabled and has a doorway with a chamfered surround and a pointed arch. The inner doorway is Norman, and has one order of shafts, scalloped capitals, and an arch with chevrons and roll moulding.	II*
North Farmhouse; 54.33387°N 1.30723°W	—	Late 17th century	The farmhouse is in stone, and has a pantile roof with shaped kneelers and stone coping. There are two storeys and four bays. On the front are two doorways, one with a chamfered surround and a triangular head, and the other with a fanlight. The windows are casements, some with keystones.	II
Tombstones to Abel and R. Hardwick; 54.33189°N 1.30020°W	—	1720	The tombstones are in the churchyard of St Mary's Church, to the south of the chancel. Both have well-lettered inscriptions, the one dated 1720 with a shaped head, and the other, dated 1723, is a short rectangular block with an inscription in the border on the top.	II
Tombstone of George Taylor; 54.33193°N 1.30002°W	—	1723	The tombstone is in the churchyard of St Mary's Church, to the south of the east end of the chancel. It is a short rectangular block with good lettering to top in the border, and is flanked by scrolls.	II
Tombstone of William Wilson; 54.33186°N 1.29998°W	—	1723	The tombstone is in the churchyard of St Mary's Church, to the south of the east end of the chancel. It consists of a short rectangular block with a well-lettered inscription on the top in the border.	II
Double tombstone 54.33187°N 1.30007°W	—	Early 18th century	The double tombstone is in the churchyard of St Mary's Church, to the south of the east end of the chancel. It consists of a short wide block with a well-lettered but worn inscription on the top and side.	II
Group of four tombstones 54.33192°N 1.30015°W	—	Early 18th century	The tombstones are in the churchyard of St Mary's Church, to the south of the east end of the nave. Three of the tombstones are rectangular blocks with well-cut inscriptions on the top surfaces, and the fourth has a shaped head.	II
Headstone and footstone 54.33198°N 1.30005°W	—	Early 18th century	The headstone and footstone are in the churchyard of St Mary's Church, to the south of the east end of the chancel. The headstone has a shaped top and well-lettered inscription, and the abutting footstone has a V-incised margin and five narrow concave-topped niches.	II
Holly Tree Cottage; 54.33331°N 1.30701°W	—	Early 18th century	The house is in stone, and has a pantile roof with shaped kneelers and stone coping. There are two storeys and two bays. On the front is a doorway, to its right is a casement window and further to the right is a small window. The upper floor contains a horizontally-sliding sash window on the left and a casement window to the right.	II
Manor Cottage; 54.33339°N 1.30710°W	—	18th century	The house is in stone, and has a pantile roof with shaped kneelers and stone coping. There are two storeys and two bays. On the front is a doorway, and the windows are horizontally-sliding sashes, those on the ground floor with lintels and keystones.	II
Mounting block 54.33194°N 1.30031°W		18th century (probable)	The mounting block is in the churchyard of St Mary's Church, to the southwest of the church. It is in limestone, and consists of a block of four steps.	II
Headstone of James Wieldon; 54.33200°N 1.30012°W	—	1767	The headstone is in the churchyard of St Mary's Church, to the south of the centre of the chancel. It has a well-lettered inscription, and is flanked by rusticated pilasters with an open pediment.	II
Glebe Cottage; 54.33352°N 1.30710°W	—	Late 18th century	The house is in stone, and has a tile roof with stone coping. There are two storeys and three bays. On the front is a doorway, and the windows are horizontally-sliding sashes.	II
