= Queen Catherine Hotel =

Pub in Osmotherley, North Yorkshire, England

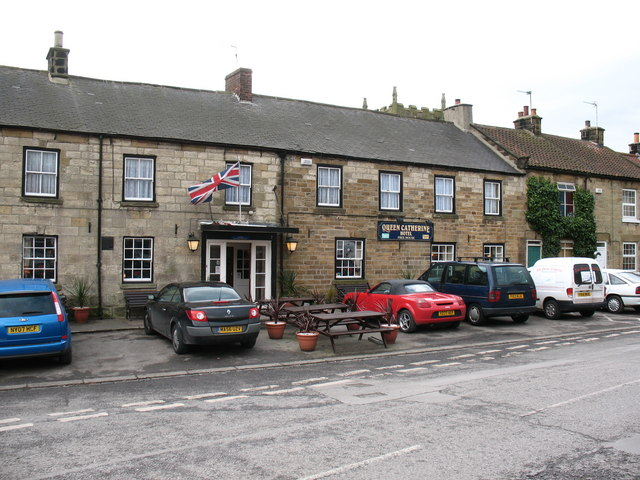
The pub, in 2008

The Queen Catherine Hotel is a historic pub in Osmotherley, North Yorkshire, a village in England.

The building was constructed in the late 18th century, as two houses. In the 19th century, they were converted into a pub. In 2020, the pub was refurbished at a cost of £1 million, following which, in addition to a bar and restaurant, it had a terrace which could seat 100 people, and accommodation for 25 guests.

The pub is built of stone with a Welsh slate roof, and stone coping on the left. There are two storeys and eight bays. On the front is a doorway with a flat hood, and the windows are sashes, some with keystones. It has been grade II listed since 1970.

== See also ==
- Listed buildings in Osmotherley, North Yorkshire
