= Leake, North Yorkshire =

Hamlet and civil parish in North Yorkshire, England

Coordinates: 54°18′32″N 1°20′06″W

Leake
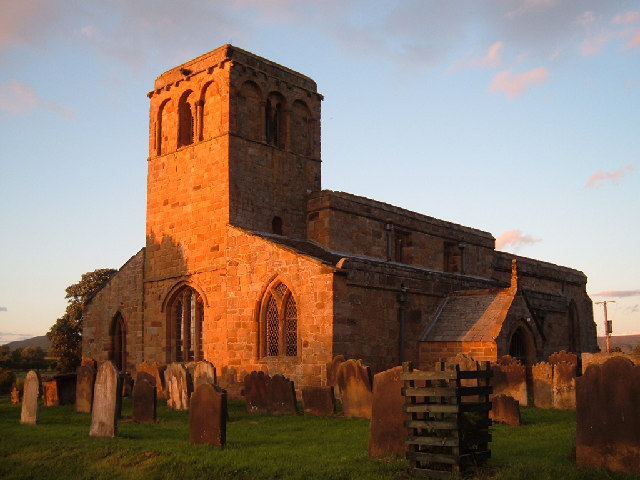
- The church of Saint Mary the Virgin, Leake; the church tower is from the 11th century

- Location within North Yorkshire
- Population: 10
- OS grid reference: SE433906
- Civil parish: Leake
- Unitary authority: North Yorkshire
- Ceremonial county: North Yorkshire
- Region: Yorkshire and the Humber
- Country: England
- Sovereign state: United Kingdom
- Post town: THIRSK
- Postcode district: YO7
- Police: North Yorkshire
- Fire: North Yorkshire
- Ambulance: Yorkshire

Leake is a hamlet and civil parish in the county of North Yorkshire, England, about six miles north of Thirsk. The population of the parish was estimated at 10 in 2010. With the population in 2011 being less than 100 information is contained in the civil parish of Borrowby, Hambleton.

From 1974 to 2023 it was part of the Hambleton District; it is now administered by the unitary North Yorkshire Council.

Leake Hall

The settlement was mentioned in the Domesday Book and the name of the hamlet derives from the Old English Lece or Lecan which means to drip or leak. All other places in England that are named Leake are situated near to water and an alternative etymology would be that Lece may be an Old English word for brook.

Leake Hall is a grade II* listed house which dates from the 17th century. Originally built in three storeys to an H-shaped floor plan, it now has a T-shaped layout with a six-bay frontage. It is now a farmhouse.

The grade I listed St Mary's Church dates from Norman times. The Norman tower has a Saxon cross built into it. The bench ends for the choir stalls in the chancel were rescued from Bridlington Priory at the Dissolution.

Close to the church is the site of the deserted medieval village of Leake.

== See also ==
- Listed buildings in Leake, North Yorkshire
