= Osmotherley, North Yorkshire =

Village and civil parish in North Yorkshire, England

Coordinates: 54°22′07″N 1°17′58″W

Osmotherley
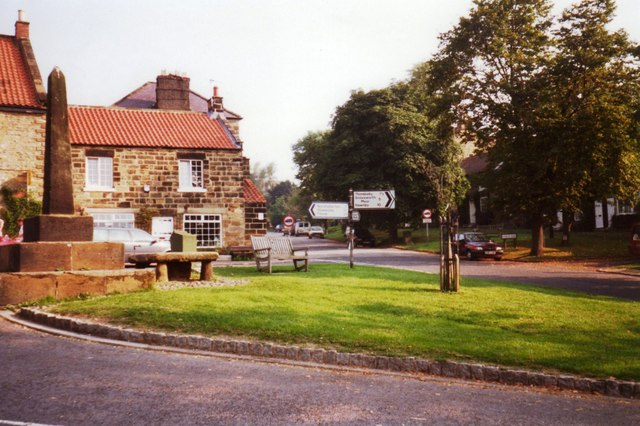
- Osmotherley Village Green

- Location within North Yorkshire
- Population: 668 (2011 census)
- OS grid reference: SE456972
- Unitary authority: North Yorkshire
- Ceremonial county: North Yorkshire
- Region: Yorkshire and the Humber
- Country: England
- Sovereign state: United Kingdom
- Post town: NORTHALLERTON
- Postcode district: DL6
- Dialling code: 01609
- Police: North Yorkshire
- Fire: North Yorkshire
- Ambulance: Yorkshire
- UK Parliament: Richmond and Northallerton

Osmotherley is a village and civil parish in the Hambleton Hills in North Yorkshire, six miles north-east of Northallerton. The village is at the western edge of the North York Moors National Park. Osmotherley is on the route of the 110-mile Cleveland Way, one of the National Trails established by Natural England.

== Origin of name ==
Osmotherley probably means the clearing or 'ley' belonging to a Viking called 'Asmund' or a Saxon called 'Osmund'. In Domesday Book it was recorded as Asmundrelac and subsequently as Osmundeslay and Osmonderlay.

Local legend says that Osmotherley was named after the mother of a villager named Oswald or Osmund, who went out to gather firewood in the winter. When she did not return her son became anxious and went out to look for her. He found her lying in the snow, dead or dying from the cold. Because he was not able to carry her back, he lay down beside her and died himself. It is where Oswald's mother lies, hence Osmotherley.

== Governance ==
Osmotherley is located in the North Riding of Yorkshire, a division of the historic county of Yorkshire. From 1974 to 2023 it was part of the Hambleton District. It is now administered by the unitary North Yorkshire Council.

An electoral ward of the same name stretches north and south from the village and had a population at the 2011 census of 1,764. The village is in the Richmond and Northallerton parliamentary constituency.

== Amenities ==
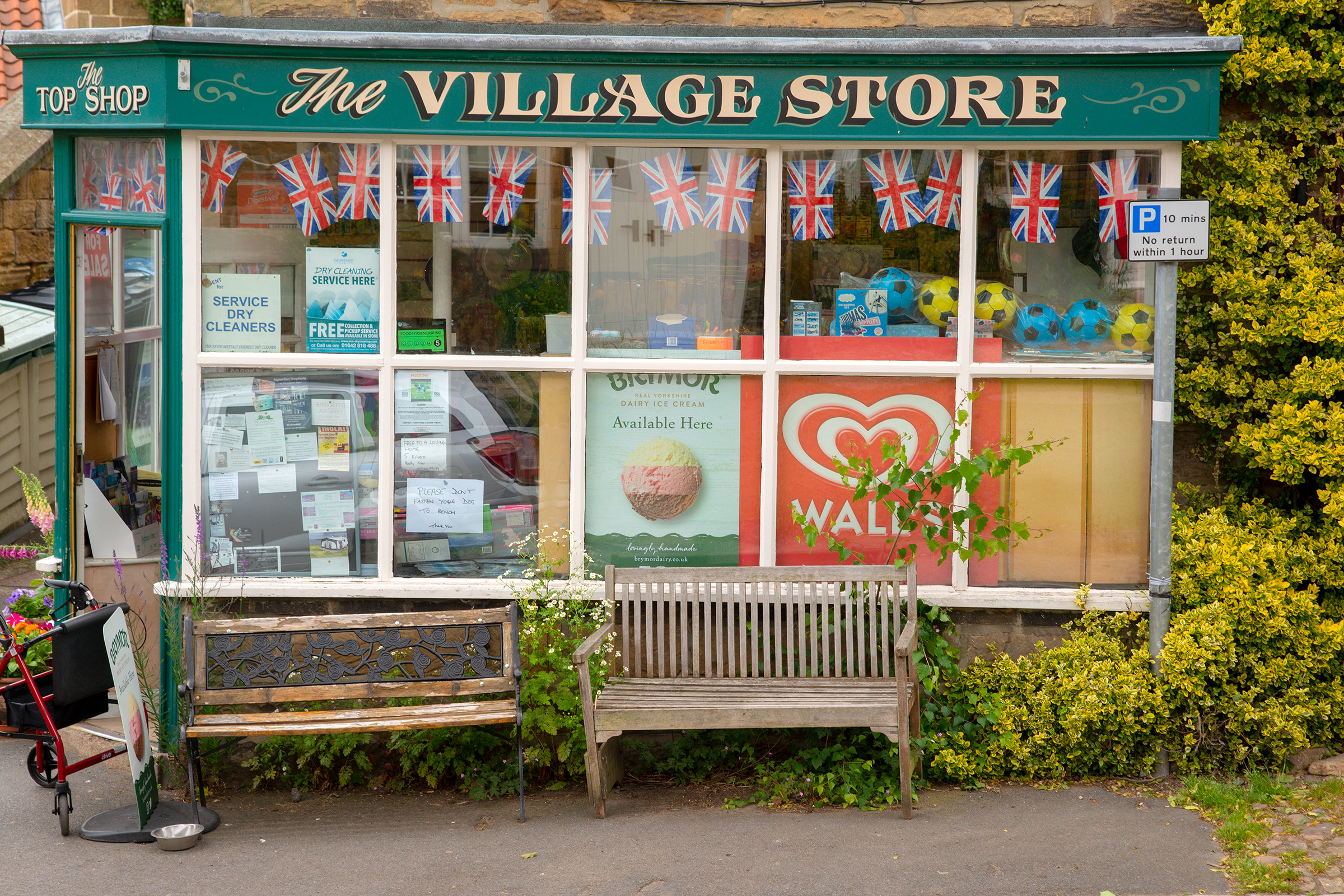
The Top Shop

The village school, Osmotherley Primary School, was founded 1857 and the present building dates from 1878. It is on School Lane and has fewer than 50 pupils.

Osmotherley has three public houses within a 55-yard (50 m) radius: the Queen Catherine Hotel, The Three Tuns and the Golden Lion. The village also has a newsagents, at Top Shop & a cafe. In 2019 the Osmotherley Fish and Chip Shop was named the best fish and chip shop in Northern England at the England Business Awards event, the fish & chip shop closed in 2024. Thompson, the shop that served Osmotherley since 1786, and an art and craft shop have both recently closed.

The Barter Table on Osmotherley Village Green is a five-legged structure about 1.5 feet (0.46 m) high with a stone slab on top. Goods were exchanged or bartered on the table and it is now a grade II listed structure.

The annual Summer Games takes place on the first weekend in July, this is a long-standing fete which is believed to have originated in celebration of the summer solstice & was originally held on Summer Games hill which stands above the village.

The annual Osmotherley Show takes place at Hall Farm in Thimbleby the first weekend in August. Thimbleby lies just to the south of Osmotherley.

== Religion ==
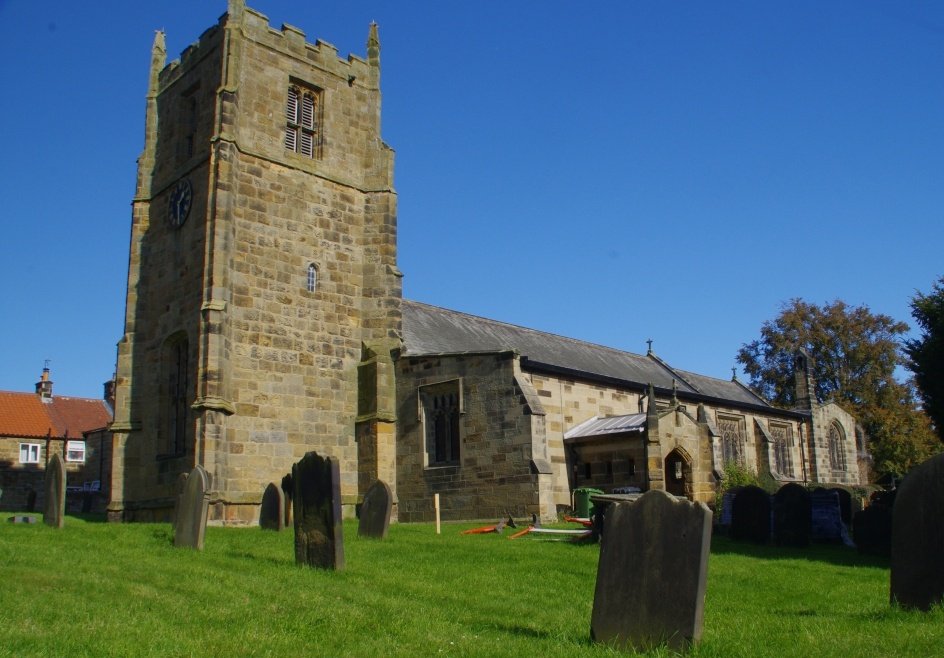
Church of St Peter

St Peter's Church, Osmotherley is built on an Angle site and parts of the building date from the Norman period. Largely rebuilt by architect C. Hodgson Fowler in 1892, it is grade II* listed.

John Wesley preached at the Barter Table on the green on several occasions, the first in 1745. In 1754 a Methodist Chapel was erected in Chapel Yard.

Osmotherley Friends Meeting House, a traditional stone building, was erected in 1690 or 1723. Meetings are held monthly. It is thought that George Fox may have visited the village in the late 17th century.

The Lady Chapel is approx half a mile outside the village on Rueberry Lane & holds catholic mass every Saturday afternoon. It is open to visitors 7 days a week. The original chapel was built for the Carthusians prior to the building of Mount Grace Priory & was restored & extended in the 1950/60s.

About 1½ miles from Osmotherley, near the A19, is Mount Grace Priory, a Carthusian religious house founded around 1396. Its ruins are at the foot of a steep wooded hill with a footpath leading into the village.

== Geography ==
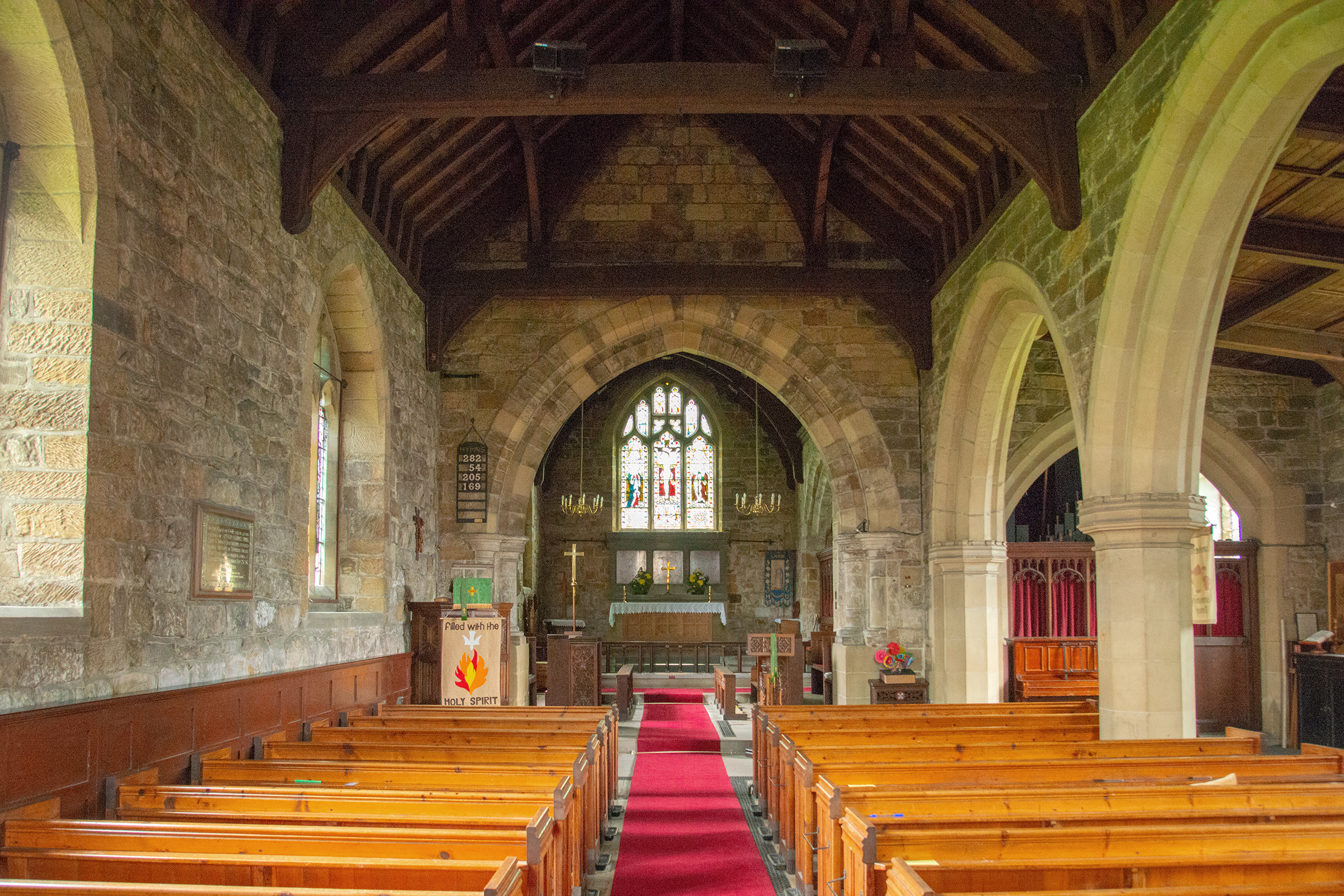
Interior, Church of St Peter

The village is on the edge of the North York Moors, the largest area of upland moorland in Great Britain.

Cod Beck Reservoir to the north is named after Cod Beck, a tributary of the River Swale. The beck derives its name from the Celtic word 'Coed', meaning wood. Just before Cod Beck reaches the reservoir is a picturesque location called Sheepwash.

Osmotherley is close to the western end of the Lyke Wake Walk. The official starting point is at the stone marker at the edge of the moors above the village.

== In popular culture ==
Osmotherley is the setting of some of the final chapters of the novel Brother in the Land by Robert Swindells. In the novel, many towns and cities are hit by individually programmed nuclear missiles but because of Osmotherley's small size the village is spared.

== See also ==
- Listed buildings in Osmotherley, North Yorkshire
- The Shrine of Our Lady of Mount Grace
