= St Mary's Church, Leake =

Church in Leake, North Yorkshire, England

Coordinates: 54°18′34″N 1°20′09″W

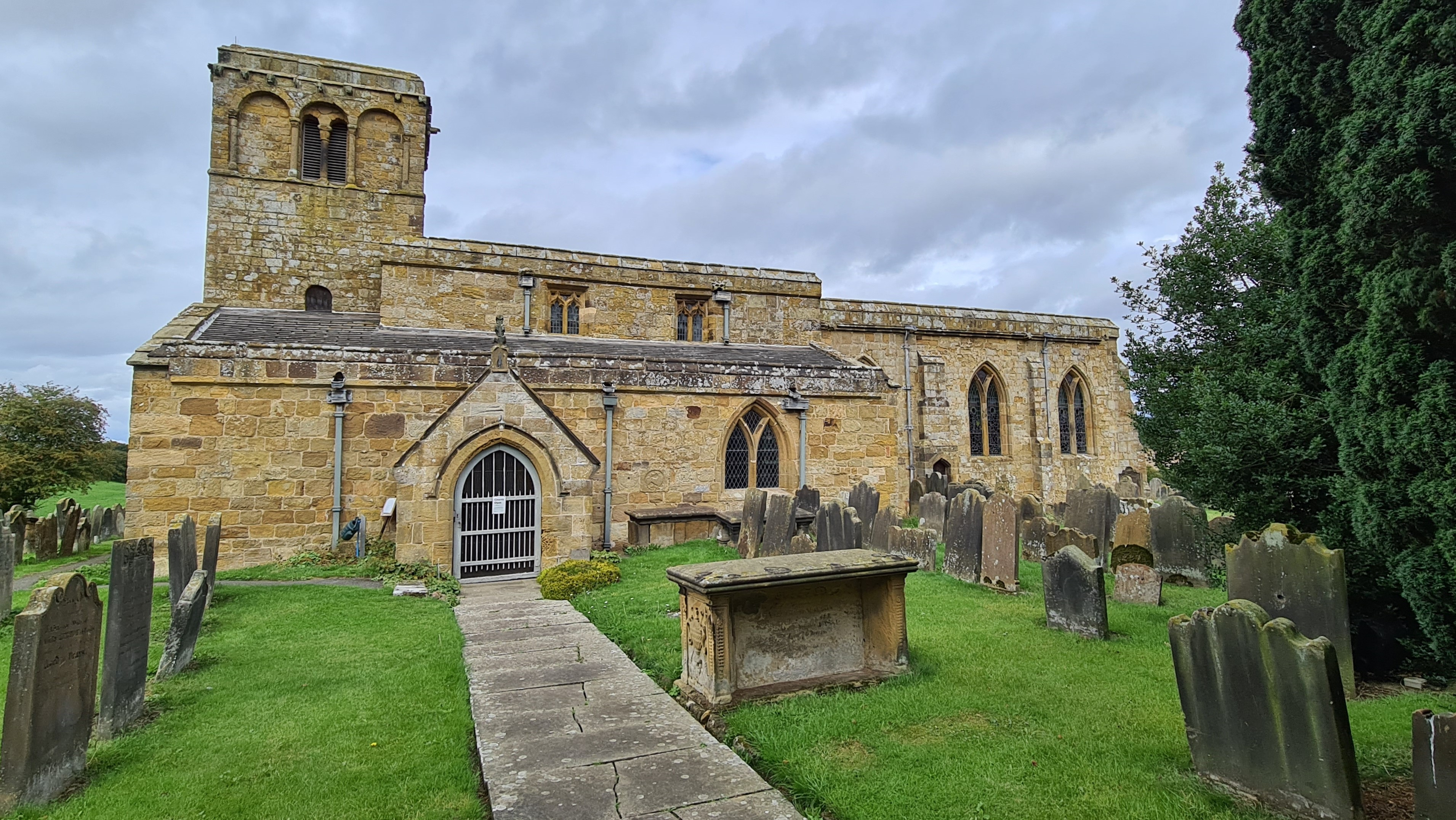
The church, in 2022

St Mary's Church is the parish church of Leake, North Yorkshire, a village in England.

The church was built in the early 12th century, from which period the tower and part of the nave wall survive. The north aisle was added in the early 13th century, and the south aisle late in the century. The chancel was then rebuilt, the work being completed in 1313, and the clerestory was added in about 1370. The roofs and some of the windows were replaced in the 15th century. The church was grade I listed in 1970.

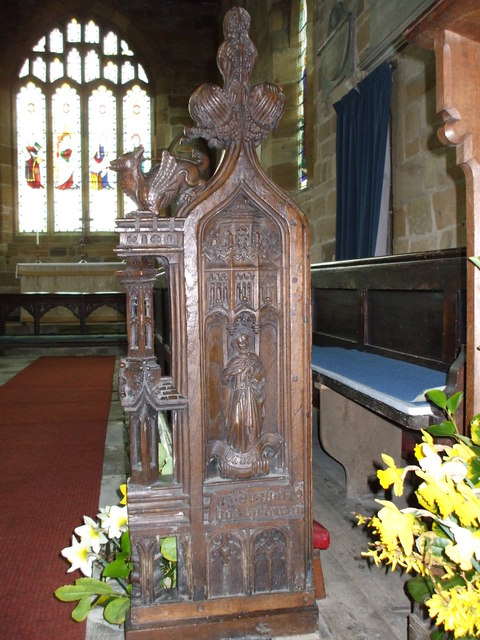
The end of a 16th-century stall

The church is built of stone, and has roofs of Welsh slate and lead. It consists of a nave with a clerestory, north and south aisles, a south porch, a chancel and a west tower. The tower is embraced by the aisles, and has three stages, a three-light west window with a pointed arch and a hood mould. In the top stage is a triple arcade, the central arch with a bell opening, and the outer arches blind, and above is a corbel table and a plain chamfered parapet. Inside, there is a 13th-century piscina, and a carving on an animal reset in the south wall, which is probably late 12th century. There are Jacobean benches, three stalls in the chancel dating from 1519, a 17th-century font cover, and a brass memorial to John Watson and his wife, from about 1530.

== See also ==
- Grade I listed buildings in North Yorkshire (district)
- Listed buildings in Leake, North Yorkshire

== External link ==
Official website
