= Thimbleby, North Yorkshire =

Village and civil parish in North Yorkshire, England

Coordinates: 54°21′08″N 1°18′32″W

Thimbleby
- Location within North Yorkshire
- Population: 258 (2011 census)
- OS grid reference: SE450959
- Unitary authority: North Yorkshire
- Ceremonial county: North Yorkshire
- Region: Yorkshire and the Humber
- Country: England
- Sovereign state: United Kingdom
- Post town: NORTHALLERTON
- Postcode district: DL6
- Police: North Yorkshire
- Fire: North Yorkshire
- Ambulance: Yorkshire

Thimbleby is a small village and civil parish in the county of North Yorkshire, England, it is in the North York Moors and close to the village of Osmotherley and the Cleveland Way, 6 miles (9.7 km) east of Northallerton. The population of the civil parish as of the 2011 census was 258.

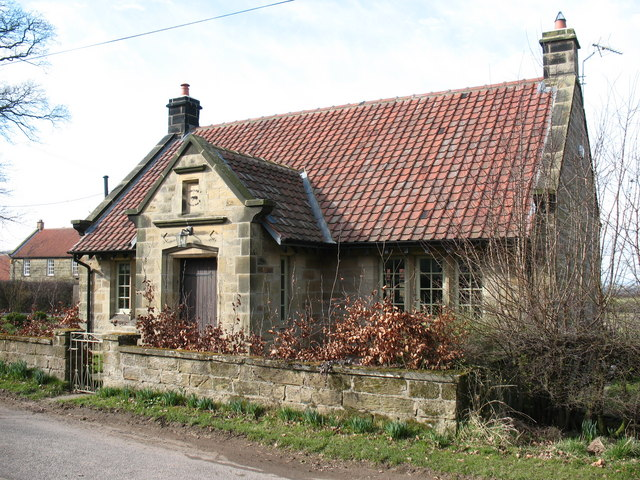
The old reading room in Thimbleby, now a private residence

From 1974 to 2023 it was part of the Hambleton District. It is now administered by the unitary North Yorkshire Council.

The annual Osmotherley Show takes place at Hall Farm in Thimbleby each August.

== Thimbleby Estate ==
Thimbleby Hall sits 1 mile north-east of the centre of the village, the estate lies within the North York Moors National Park and was listed in the Domesday Book as the property of the King family of Northallerton Manor. It was later granted to the Bishops of Durham, when part of the Estate was gifted to Rievaulx Abbey. At one time the size of the estate was in excess of 20,000 acres (8,100 ha).

== Thimbleby Lodge ==
In June 1838, Thimbleby Lodge was bought by Robert Haynes, a retired slave owner from Barbados, presumably using the slavery compensation he had received from the British government. Three sons and a daughter were born there between 1839 and 1862. When he died in 1873 Robert was worth some £35,000. The estate then passed to his sons William and Edmund.

== See also ==
- Listed buildings in Thimbleby, North Yorkshire
