= Cod Beck, North Yorkshire =

River in North Yorkshire, England

Coordinates: 54°10′N 1°21′W

Cod Beck
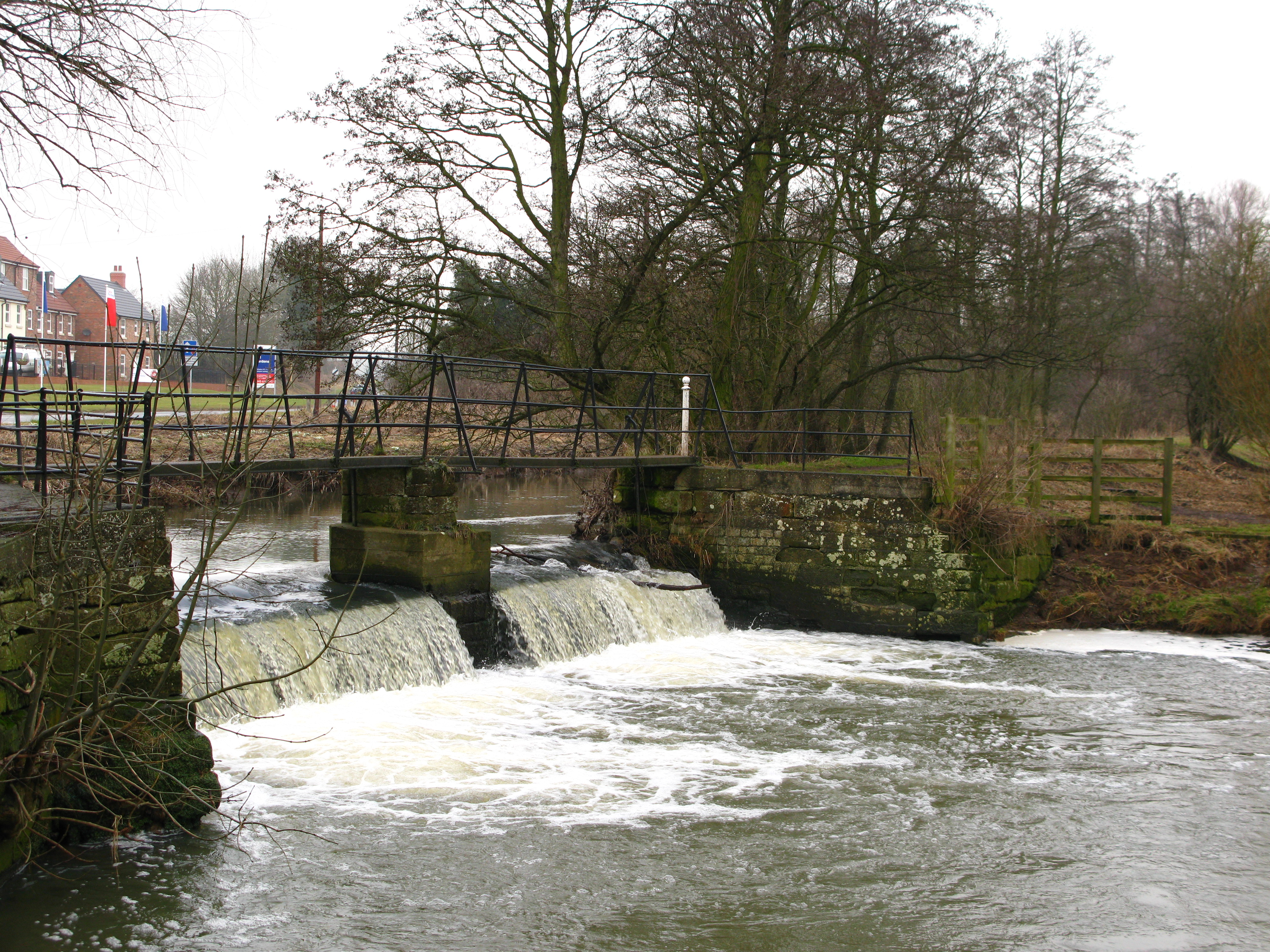
- Cod Beck Weir, Thirsk

Location
- Country: England
- County: North Yorkshire
- Unitary authority: North Yorkshire

Physical characteristics
- Mouth: River Swale, Yorkshire
  - location: Leckby Grange, North Yorkshire
- Discharge
  - location: River Swale

Basin features
- Tributaries
  - left: Oakdale Beck, Howl Beck, Broad Beck, Spital Beck, Whitelass Beck, Moor Stell, Paradise Beck, Willow Beck
  - right: Great Pasture Beck

Cod Beck is a river in North Yorkshire, England. It has a catchment area of 8,912 hectares (34.41 mi^{2}). It flows for over 20 miles (32 km) from Osmotherley, through Thirsk, and enters the River Swale just to the south of Topcliffe.

== History ==
The river extends for 20 miles (32 km) from above Cod Beck Reservoir at Osmotherley on the edge of the North York Moors through Thirsk and on to join the River Swale about a 1-mile (1.6 km) south of Topcliffe. In 1767 an act of Parliament was obtained (Codbreck [sic] Brook Navigation Act 1766 (7 Geo. 3. c. 95)) to canalise the river from its mouth on the Swale, as far upstream as Thirsk; but apart from one set of locks, this scheme failed. The river flowing through Thirsk powered at least one mill, the Union Mill, which ground corn. Osmotherley had five mills which were powered by the river; three textile, one corn, and one timber.

Cod Beck has a long history of flooding Thirsk and a feasibility study completed in April 2005 recommended additional flood defences and upstream storage. In 2011, a proposed flood defence scheme in Thirsk was cancelled due to the Environment Agency having its budget cut by 41%. The highest water level recorded at Thirsk was 2.32 metres (7 ft 7 in) In January 2021.

The name Cod Beck is a derivative of Cold Beck. The surrounding topography means the beck follows an unusual course, running westwards at first away from the Hambleton Hills, then heading south at Foxton until it meets the Swale. The total area that the beck drains is just over 8,912 hectares (34.41 mi^{2}).

The river quality is recognised as being good, and supports native white-clawed crayfish, grayling, trout, stone loach, bullhead and lamphrey. Otters have also been noted along the watercourse.

== Settlements ==
from source

- Osmotherley
- Ellerbeck
- Foxton
- Kirby Sigston
- Thornton-le-Street
- North Kilvington
- South Kilvington, where Spital Beck and Whitelass Beck enter the river
- Thirsk
- Sowerby
- Dalton

(Joins Swale)
