= Broxa, North Yorkshire =

Village in North Yorkshire, England

Coordinates: 54.31062°N 0.54834°W

Broxa
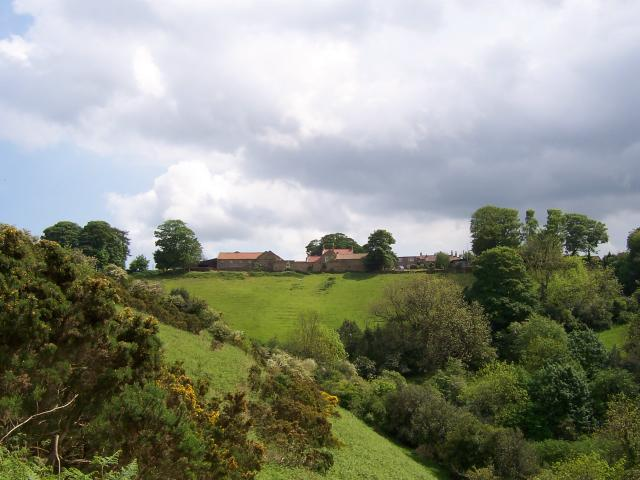
- Looking south-east towards Broxa

- Location within North Yorkshire
- OS grid reference: SE945915
- Civil parish: Broxa-cum-Troutsdale
- Unitary authority: North Yorkshire
- Ceremonial county: North Yorkshire
- Region: Yorkshire and the Humber
- Country: England
- Sovereign state: United Kingdom
- Post town: SCARBOROUGH
- Postcode district: YO13
- Police: North Yorkshire
- Fire: North Yorkshire
- Ambulance: Yorkshire

Broxa is a village in the civil parish of Broxa-cum-Troutsdale, in North Yorkshire, England, within the North York Moors National Park. The village is 6.2 miles (10 km) west of Scarborough, at an elevation of 531 feet (162 m). The River Derwent is 1,600 feet (500 m) west of the village.

Whilst some 12th century documents mention Broxa (in relation to land granted by the abbot of Whitby), the village was not listed in the Domesday Book. It is thought that it was included in the manor of Hackness. The name of the village derives from a personal name Broce, meaning the enclosure of Broce's people.

Broxa was formerly a township in the parish of Hackness, in 1866 Broxa became a separate civil parish, on 1 April 1985 the parish was abolished to form "Broxa cum Troutsdale". In 1971 the parish had a population of 15. Until 1974 it was in the North Riding of Yorkshire. From 1974 to 2023 it was part of the Borough of Scarborough, it is now administered by the unitary North Yorkshire Council.

To the north of the village is Broxa Forest, a 1,527 acres (618 ha) woodland maintained by Forestry England which has walking and cycling trails. The Moors to Sea Cycle route passes through the village and the forest.

== See also ==
- Listed buildings in Broxa-cum-Troutsdale
