= Listed buildings in Suffield-cum-Everley =

Suffield-cum-Everley is a civil parish in the county of North Yorkshire, England. It contains four listed buildings that are recorded in the National Heritage List for England. All the listed buildings are designated at Grade II, the lowest of the three grades, which is applied to "buildings of national importance and special interest". The parish contains the hamlet of Suffield and the surrounding countryside, and the listed buildings consist of three farmhouses and a bridge.

== Buildings ==
Name and location	Photograph	Date	Notes
Keld Runners Farmhouse; 54.29410°N 0.47678°W		Late 18th century	The farmhouse, incorporating a former outbuilding, is in sandstone, and has a pantile roof with coped gables and plain kneelers. There is one storey and attics, the original house has two bays, and the former outbuilding, lower on the right, has two bays. The doorway has a rectangular fanlight. The windows on the front are casements, at the rear are horizontally sliding sash windows, and on the attics are gabled half-dormers with pierced and scalloped bargeboards and finials.
Mowthorp Bridge; 54.28040°N 0.49618°W		Early 19th century	The bridge carries Mowthorp Road over the Sea Cut. It is in sandstone, with alterations in concrete, and consists of two segmental arches. There are round cutwaters rising as buttresses, bands at impost level and at the base of the parapets, which have chamfered coping.
Mowthorp Farmhouse; 54.28053°N 0.49546°W		Early 19th century	The farmhouse is in sandstone, and has a slate roof with coped gables and plain kneelers. There are two storeys and two bays. Steps lead up to the central doorway that has a rectangular fanlight, and the windows are sashes.
Northfield Farmhouse; 54.30276°N 0.48577°W		Early 19th century	The farmhouse is in sandstone, with quoins, and a pantile roof with coped gables and plain kneelers. There are two storeys and three bays. The central doorway has a rectangular fanlight, and the windows are sashes with quoined surrounds.
