= Moorcock =

Moorcock may refer to:

== People ==
- Ace Moorcock, pen name of American cartoonist Brad Parker (born 1961)
- Michael Moorcock (born 1939), English science fiction and fantasy fiction author
  - Hilary Bailey (1936–2017), British writer, critic and editor, wife of Michael Moorcock 1962–1978

== Other uses ==
- Red grouse, a bird sometimes known as moorcock
- The Moorcock, an English contract law case about a ship The Moorcock
- Sly Moorcock, a fictional character from the Ben Elton novel Stark

== See also ==
- Moorcock Inn (disambiguation)
- Moor (disambiguation)
- Cock (disambiguation)
- Moorhen
