= Listed buildings in Hackness =

Hackness is a civil parish in the county of North Yorkshire, England. It contains 27 listed buildings that are recorded in the National Heritage List for England. Of these, two are listed at Grade I, the highest of the three grades, and the others are at Grade II, the lowest grade. The parish contains the village of Hackness and the surrounding countryside. The most important buildings in the parish are a church and the country house, Hackness Hall, both of which are listed at Grade I. Many of the listed buildings are associated with the hall, in its gardens and grounds. The other listed buildings include houses, cottages and associated structures, farmhouses and farm buildings, a cornmill, two bridges, a pinfold, an orangery, and a telephone kiosk.

== Key ==
Grade	Criteria
I	Buildings of exceptional interest, sometimes considered to be internationally important
II	Buildings of national importance and special interest

== Buildings ==
Name and location	Photograph	Date	Notes	Grade
St Peter's Church; 54.30148°N 0.51228°W		11th century or earlier	The church has been altered and extended through the centuries, and was restored in about 1870. It is built in sandstone with a slate roof, and consists of a nave with a clerestory, north and south aisles, a south porch, a chancel with a north chapel and vestry, and a west steeple. The steeple has a tower with three stages, a chamfered plinth, a stair turret at the southwest, angle buttresses, chamfered bands, lancet windows, paired bell openings with pointed heads under round arches and hood moulds, an embattled parapet, and a recessed octagonal spire.	I
Lowdales Cottage; 54.31235°N 0.53458°W	—	Late 17th century	The cottage is in stone, with quoins, and a pantile roof with a brick ridge, and stone coped gables and kneelers. There is a single storey and attics, and a recessed extension on the left. Most of the windows are horizontally-sliding sashes, in the extension is a casement window, and in the attic are gabled dormers with decorative bargeboards. Inside, there is an inglenook fireplace, and in the roof is a central upper cruck truss.	II
Cornmill north of Mill Farmhouse; 54.29543°N 0.51423°W		Mid 18th century	The cornmill and attached outbuildings are in sandstone with pantile roofs. The mill has a stone plinth, two storeys and three bays, to the left is a cart shed with one storey and a loft, and two bays, and further to the left are single-storey buildings. In the centre of the mill is a doorway, above which is a lifting door, the outer bays contain fixed lights, and the roof has coped gables and shaped kneelers. The mill tailrace is carried away through a vaulted stone culvert passing under the mill buildings.	II
Dovecote east of Keeper's House; 54.29770°N 0.51903°W	—	Mid to late 18th century	The dovecote is in sandstone, with floor and eaves bands, and a pyramidal slate roof. There are two storeys and a square plan. On the front is a doorway with a triple keystone, above which is a roundel. In the upper storey of the right return is a lunette.	II
Church Cottage; 54.30148°N 0.51281°W		Late 18th century	The house is in sandstone, with a stepped eaves course, and a pantile roof with coped gables and shaped kneelers. There are two storeys, three bays, flanking lower single-bay wings, and a later rear wing. The windows are horizontally-sliding sashes.	II
Dry Bridge; 54.30193°N 0.50990°W		Late 18th century	The bridge crosses the Hackness to Suffield Road, and links two parts of the gardens of Hackness Hall. It is in sandstone and cambered, with three arches of voussoirs, consisting of a central segmental arch, and smaller round-headed side arches. The bridge has rectangular piers with imposts and flat coping, surmounted by railings.	II
Farm buildings northwest of Wrench Green Farmhouse; 54.29193°N 0.51729°W	—	Late 18th century	The farm buildings are in sandstone with pantile roofs. They consist of a two-storey barn and a cart shed with a granary above, flanked by single-storey ranges of stables, cowhouses and loose boxes, arranged around three sides of walled foldyard, which was later roofed. The cart shed has orange-red piers and arches, the yard has a two-tier hipped roof, and elsewhere the roofs are pitched.	II
Keeper's House; 54.29773°N 0.51921°W	—	Late 18th century	The house is in sandstone, with a stepped eaves course, and a slate roof with coped gables and shaped kneelers. There are two storeys, three bays and a continuous rear outshut under a catslide roof. The central doorway has a divided fanlight, and the windows are sashes.	II
Lowdales Farmhouse; 54.31105°N 0.53517°W	—	Late 18th century	The farmhouse is in sandstone, and has a pantile roof with coped gables and plain kneelers. There are two storeys and three bays, and a single-storey outshut at the rear under a catslide roof. In the centre is a doorway with a divided fanlight, and the windows are sashes, most with keystones.	II
Mill Farmhouse; 54.29509°N 0.51429°W	—	Late 18th century	The farmhouse is in sandstone on the front and sides, and in orange-red brick at the rear, and it has an M-shaped pantile roof. There are two storeys, a double depth plan, three bays, and a lean-to on the left. The central doorway has a fanlight, and the windows are horizontally-sliding sashes.	II
Mount Misery Farmhouse; 54.29225°N 0.54657°W	—	Late 18th century	The farmhouse is in sandstone, and has a pantile roof with coped gables and shaped kneelers. There are two storeys, two bays, and a single-storey lean-to on the left. The doorway is in the centre, the widows are horizontally-sliding sashes, and all the openings have tripartite lintels.	II
Pinfold; 54.29658°N 0.51849°W	—	Late 18th century	The pinfold is in sandstone, and has a circular plan. The walls are about 1.5 metres (4 ft 11 in) high, they are finished with transversely-laid stones, and on the road side is a slatted gate.	II
River View, cottage and forge 54.29683°N 0.51855°W		Late 18th century	A pair of cottages with an attached smithy to the right, in sandstone, with a pantile roof, coped gables and shaped kneelers. There is a single storey and attics, and five bays. The cottage to the left has horizontally-sliding sash windows with tooled lintels, the right cottage has sash windows with wedge lintels, and the smithy has paired doors, and paired six-pane windows under a continuous timber lintel. In the attic are gabled dormers with scalloped bargeboards.	II
Hackness Hall and railings 54.30121°N 0.50927°W		1791–96	A country house that was extended in 1810, and partly rebuilt in 1910 by Walter Brierley following a fire. It is in sandstone with slate roofs. The entrance front has two storeys and seven bays, and a lower L-shaped wing to the left. The middle three bays project under a pediment, and in the centre is a pedimented porch with fluted Doric columns, in antis, containing double doors, over which is a decorated panel. Above the doorway is a tripartite sash window with Ionic columns, a frieze with swags, and a segmental pediment. The other windows are sashes in architraves with modillion cornices. On the front is a pulvinated frieze, sill bands, dentilled eaves, a modillion cornice, and a balustraded parapet. The garden front has seven bays, the middle three bays projecting, with four giant fluted Ionic pilasters, and a tympanum containing an escutcheon in high relief. The terrace railings are decorative and in cast iron.	I
Barn, Hackness Hall; 54.30061°N 0.50778°W	—	c. 1795	The barn is in sandstone on a plinth, with sill and impost bands, and a hipped slate roof. There is a rectangular plan, two storeys and three bays. On the front are double doors under a full-height arch, flanked by round-arched window openings.	II
Dutch barn, Hackness Hall; 54.30085°N 0.50724°W	—	c. 1795	The barn is sandstone with a hipped slate roof. It has a rectangular plan, a single storey, and three bays. In the centre is a segmental arch flanked by round arches, all springing from piers with imposts, and in the returns are two round arches.	II
Stable yard, Hackness Hall; 54.30070°N 0.50840°W	—	c. 1795	The stables, carriage sheds and workshops are in sandstone with slate roofs, and form four ranges round a courtyard. The main range has two storeys on a plinth, and nine arcaded bays, the middle three bays projecting under a pediment. In the centre is a carriage arch, flanked by recessed windows with arches of shaped voussoirs, and in the upper floor are sash windows. Above is a moulded eaves cornice, and raking cornices to the pediment that contains an oculus with keystones in the tympanum. In the centre of the hipped roof is a cupola with a weathervane. Associated with other ranges are two pumps, each with a lead plaque containing a family crest.	II
Low Hall; 54.30133°N 0.51370°W	—	Late 18th to early 19th century	The house is in sandstone, with a modillion eaves cornice, and a slate roof with coped gables and shaped kneelers. There are two storeys and three bays, and flanking lower two-storey one-bay wings. In the centre is a doorway in an architrave with a cornice, and the windows are sashes.	II
Outbuilding, pump and wall north of Low Hall; 54.30156°N 0.51373°W	—	c. 1800	A sawmill, later an outbuilding, consisting of a barn, the remains of the mill, the mill race and the wheel chamber. It is in sandstone with a hipped pantile roof. The barn has two storeys and four bays. To its right is the three-bay wall of the former sawmill, containing three segmental-arched openings of voussoirs. Against the barn is a trough, and a pump with a lead plaque containing a family crest and a date.	II
Orangery; 54.30241°N 0.51221°W	—	c. 1800	The orangery, designed by John Carr, is in sandstone on a plinth at the front, and in orange-red brick with sandstone dressings on the sides and at the rear. The plinth extends to form a terrace, and there are clasping pilasters at the ends, and a moulded eaves course and cornice. The orangery has a single storey and an arcaded front of five bays, the round-arched openings with moulded hoods on pilaster piers with moulded imposts. The central entrance and the flanking sash windows have round heads. At the rear is a five-bay blind arcade with imposts and keystones.	II
Gates and gate piers northeast of Hackness Hall; 54.30161°N 0.50647°W		c. 1810	The gate piers flanking the entrance to the drive are in sandstone, with a square plan, they are on tall plinths, and about 3.25 metres (10.7 ft) high. The piers have alternate long and short quoins forming bands of chamfered rustication. Each pier has a moulded abacus, a frieze with swags, a moulded cornice, and a flat stepped cap with a carved eagle finial. On the front is the family crest. The gates are in cast iron, and probably date from the 20th century.	II
Bridge over Lowdales Beck; 54.30187°N 0.51448°W	—	Early 19th century	The bridge carries Storr Lane over the stream. It is in sandstone, and consists of a single segmental arch between pilasters. The bridge has a band, and a plain parapet with flat coping. At the ends of the parapet are cylindrical piers with shallow domed tops.	II
Hilla Green Farmhouse and cottage 54.29946°N 0.54316°W		Early 19th century	The farmhouse and attached cottage are in sandstone, with a stepped eaves course, and a pantile roof with coped gables and shaped kneelers. There are two storeys and three bays. On the front is a doorway with a buttress to the left, and the entrance to the cottage is in the right gable wall. The windows are sashes with painted stone sills and plain lintels.	II
Icehouse; 54.30212°N 0.50965°W	—	Early 19th century	The icehouse has a circular plan, it is partly sunk into the ground, and has a doorway to the north. The exterior is in rusticated sandstone, the interior is in orange-red brick, and it has a conical roof of stone flags and brick with a square opening at the apex.	II
Red House and railings 54.29676°N 0.51494°W		Early 19th century	An inn, later a private house, in sandstone, with a moulded eaves cornice and paired modillions, and a pantile roof. There are two storeys, a double depth plan, and front of three bays, flanked by single-storey outbuildings. In the centre is a doorway approached by steps, flanked by cast iron railings with urn finials. The doorway has a divided fanlight, and a cornice hood on fluted consoles. The windows are sashes with keystones.	II
Hackness Grange Country Hotel; 54.29755°N 0.52170°W	—	Mid 19th century	A country house, later a hotel, in sandstone on a chamfered plinth, with chamfered quoins, overhanging eaves, and hipped slate roofs. There are two storeys, a front range of three bays, and a five-bay extension to the right. In the centre of the main range is a full-height projecting porch with a cornice on decorative brackets, and a doorway with a partly rusticated surround, and a fanlight. The windows are sashes, those in the ground floor with segmental heads, eared surrounds, keystones, and recessed panels below. The upper floor windows have round-arched architraves, square columns with imposts, and keystones.	II
Telephone kiosk 54.29589°N 0.51479°W		1935	The K6 type telephone kiosk was designed by Giles Gilbert Scott. Constructed in cast iron with a square plan and a dome, it has three unperforated crowns in the top panels.	II
