= Hackness Cross =

The Hackness Cross is an Anglo-Saxon high cross in Hackness, a village in North Yorkshire, in England.

The cross was carved some time between the late 7th and early 9th centuries. It may be associated with a nunnery which Hilda of Whitby founded in the village in about 680, and might have stood in a side-valley known as Crossdales. The cross was later dismantled; local legend claims that it was thrown into the village pond. Before 1848, two stones from the cross were found in an outbuilding of Hackness Hall, one perhaps having seen use as a gate post. In 1859, these fragments were placed in the chancel of St Peter's Church, Hackness. The two stones were not originally adjacent, but have been placed on display one atop the other.

The cross would have been about 1.75 metres high, although the two fragments are just 96 cm and 45 cm tall, respectively. They are made of sandstone, probably sourced from the local area and are now both very worn. Despite this, they have attracted a great deal of attention for their five separate inscriptions, in four different scripts. The Latin letters can be partly interpreted, stating in Latin "Oedilburga blessed for ever". Not enough survives of the text in Anglo-Saxon runes to interpret it, while a tentative translation of part of the Hahalruna again refers to Oedilburga. There is also a text in an unknown script with some similarities to Ogham. Other carvings include plant scrolls, which may imitate the volutes of the Ionic order; knotwork; faces; and beasts, perhaps griffons. While the work is ambitious and the cross was of high status, it is less well executed than similar cross at Bewcastle, Ruthwell and Easby.
