= St Margaret's Church, Harwood Dale =

Church in Harwood Dale, North Yorkshire, England

Coordinates: 54°20′49″N 0°31′26″W

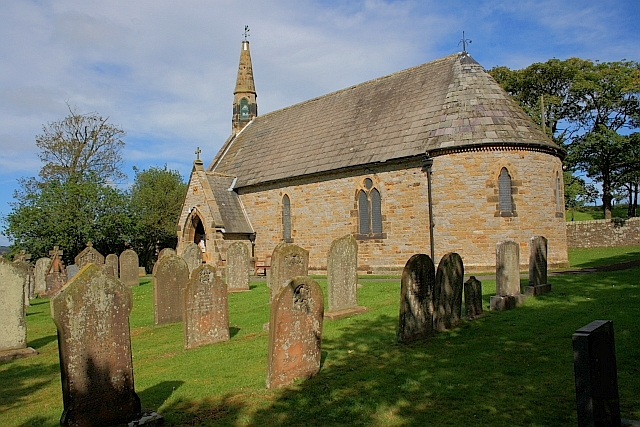
The church, in 2011

St Margaret's Church is an Anglican church in Harwood Dale, a village in North Yorkshire, in England.

The church was built in 1862, as a replacement for Old St Margaret's Church, Harwood Dale. It is in the Early English Gothic style, and is a small, rectangular, building, with a combined nave and chancel, with a semicircular apse. It has a square stone bellcote, set on a diagonal, with a spirelet and one bell. The windows are lancets, and there is a south porch.
