= Suffield, North Yorkshire =

Hamlet in North Yorkshire, England

Coordinates: 54.300623°N 0.487885°W

Suffield
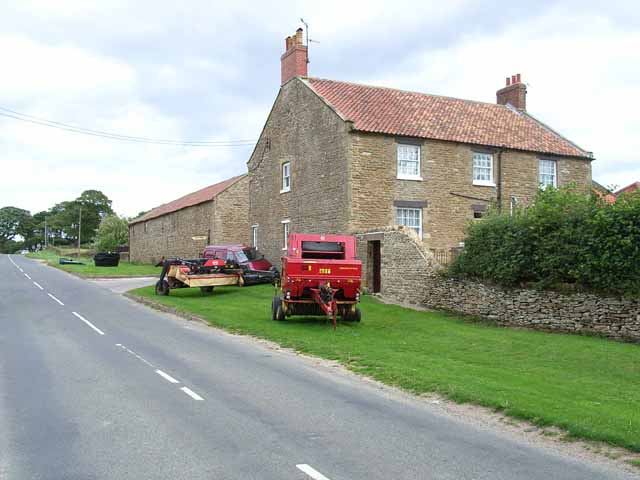
- Road and farm in Suffield

- Location within North Yorkshire
- OS grid reference: SE985905
- Civil parish: Suffield-cum-Everley
- Unitary authority: North Yorkshire
- Ceremonial county: North Yorkshire
- Region: Yorkshire and the Humber
- Country: England
- Sovereign state: United Kingdom
- Post town: SCARBOROUGH
- Postcode district: YO13
- Police: North Yorkshire
- Fire: North Yorkshire
- Ambulance: Yorkshire
- UK Parliament: Scarborough and Whitby

Suffield is a hamlet in the parish of Suffield-cum-Everley in North Yorkshire, England. the hamlet is 4.5 miles (7.2 km) north west of Scarborough (2 miles (3.2 km) west of Scalby) and just inside the North York Moors National Park. From 1974 to 2023 it was part of the Borough of Scarborough, it is now administered by the unitary North Yorkshire Council.

The name Suffield derives from the Old English sūðfeld meaning 'south field'.

A local cider manufacturer works out of the hamlet.

== See also ==
- Listed buildings in Suffield-cum-Everley
