= Silpho =

Village and civil parish in North Yorkshire, England

Coordinates: 54.316180°N 0.517000°W

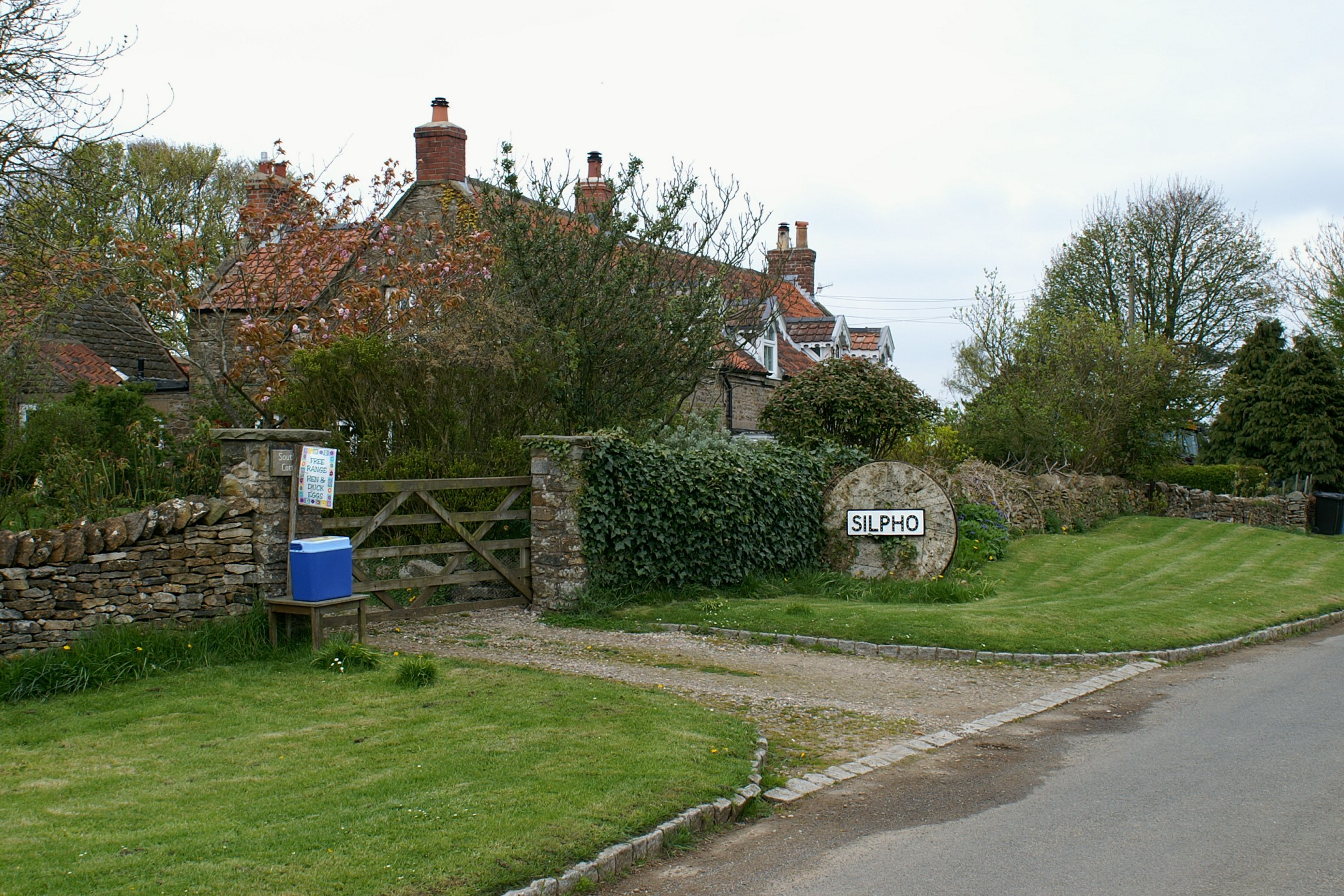

- Location within North Yorkshire
- Population: 31 (2001 census)
- OS grid reference: SE965921
- Civil parish: Silpho
- Unitary authority: North Yorkshire
- Ceremonial county: North Yorkshire
- Region: Yorkshire and the Humber
- Country: England
- Sovereign state: United Kingdom
- Post town: SCARBOROUGH
- Postcode district: YO13
- Police: North Yorkshire
- Fire: North Yorkshire
- Ambulance: Yorkshire
- UK Parliament: Scarborough and Whitby

Silpho is a village and civil parish in the county of North Yorkshire, England.

According to the 2001 UK census, Silpho parish had a population of 31. At the 2011 Census the population remained less than 100. Details are included in the civil parish of Suffield-cum-Everley.

The name Silpho probably derives from the Old English scelfhōh meaning 'shelf hill spur'.

The hill leading to Silpho from Hackness, was the final climb of 1.5 km (Cote de Silpho), on Stage 3 of the 2018 Tour de Yorkshire

The parish council is Hackness & Harwood Dale Group Parish Council which covers the six parishes of Broxa-cum-Troutsdale, Darncombe-cum-Langdale End, Hackness, Harwood Dale, Silpho and Suffield-cum-Everley.

From 1974 to 2023 it was part of the Borough of Scarborough, it is now administered by the unitary North Yorkshire Council.

== See also ==
- Listed buildings in Silpho
