= Listed buildings in Broxa-cum-Troutsdale =

Broxa-cum-Troutsdale is a civil parish in the county of North Yorkshire, England. It contains six listed buildings that are recorded in the National Heritage List for England. All the listed buildings are designated at Grade II, the lowest of the three grades, which is applied to "buildings of national importance and special interest". The parish contains the village of Broxa and part of the valley of Troutsdale. The listed buildings consist of farmhouses, farm buildings, a former school and a telephone kiosk.

== Buildings ==
Name and location	Photograph	Date	Notes
Manor Farmhouse; 54.28211°N 0.59155°W	—	Mid 18th century	The farmhouse is in sandstone, and has a pantile roof with coped gables and shaped kneelers. There are two storeys, four bays, and a single-storey outbuilding on the right. The windows are a mix of sashes and casements, and most of the openings have tooled tripartite lintels.
Low Hall; 54.29654°N 0.57044°W		Early 19th century	A farmhouse in sandstone on a plinth that has a pantile roof with coped gables and shaped kneelers. There are two storeys, a double depth plan, and three bays. In the centre is a doorway with a divided fanlight, the windows are sashes and all the openings have painted wedge lintels, those in the ground floor also with keystones. At the rear are single-storey outbuildings under a catslide roof.
Outbuildings east of Manor Farmhouse; 54.28225°N 0.59113°W	—	Early 19th century	The outbuildings consist of a stable, a pigsty, and a hay store, and they are in stone with a pantile roof. There is a single storey, and they contain doorways, stable doors, and sash and fixed windows.
Stable and barn north of Manor Farmhouse; 54.28239°N 0.59144°W		Early 19th century	The stable and barn are in stone, and have pantile roofs with coped gables and shaped kneelers. The stable has a single storey, and an eaves band. It contains doorways, including stable doors, and casement windows. The barn projects forward, it is taller and contains doorways, a taking-in door and a small window.
Former Troutsdale School House; 54.29048°N 0.57911°W		1870–75	The former school is in brick, the lower part is in stone, and it has a stone slate roof. The building consists of a single cell with a rectangular plan. On the front is a projecting porch with a flat roof containing a lancet-headed doorway, and to its left is a three-light window with chamfered stone shouldered arches. In the left gable end is a chimney flanked by similar windows, in the right gable end is a window with a pointed arch, and on the apex is an ornate iron cross.
Telephone kiosk 54.31050°N 0.54843°W		1935	The K6 type telephone kiosk was designed by Giles Gilbert Scott. Constructed in cast iron with a square plan and a dome, it has three unperforated crowns in the top panels.
