= Scalby Beck =

River in North Yorkshire, England

Coordinates: 54°17′44.9″N 0°26′53.6″W

Sea Cut (Scalby Beck)
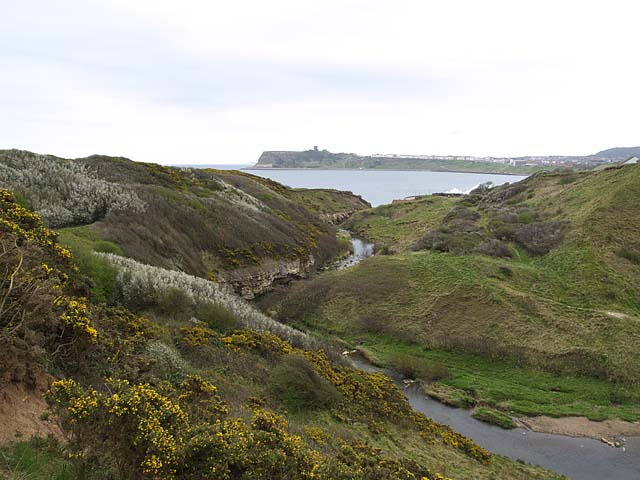
- Scalby Beck (Sea Cut) meandering to its mouth at Scalby Mills

Location
- Country: England
- County: North Yorkshire
- Unitary authority: North Yorkshire

Physical characteristics
- Source
  - location: Suffield-cum-Everley
  - elevation: 41 m (135 ft)
- Mouth: Scalby Ness
  - location: Scalby Mills
  - elevation: 0 m (0 ft)
- Length: 5 mi (8.0 km)
- Basin size: 32.126 km^{2} (12.404 sq mi) (Note: This is including Burniston Beck, Lindhead Beck and Cow Wath Beck)

Basin features
- Tributaries
  - left: North Back Drain, Church Beck, Cow Wath Beck (Note: This is the official name of the beck when it enters the Sea Cut, but it is known locally as Burniston Beck, which is its proper name further upstream)
  - right: Throxenby Beck, Newby Beck

Scalby Beck, or the Sea Cut (Note: Also known as New Cut and Scalby Brook) is a small river that enters the North Sea at Scalby Mills, Scarborough, North Yorkshire, England. The beck is fed from local streams in Scalby, Newby and Burniston and other watercourses draining off the nearby hills. It is also a bypass channel for the upper reaches of the River Derwent when it is under flood conditions.

Control of floodwaters and flood prevention is the responsibility of the Environment Agency as the Sea Cut is designated as a main river alongside the Derwent, the Hertford and the Esk rivers. The becks that flow into the Sea Cut and Scalby Beck are maintained by North Yorkshire Council.

== History ==
The Sea Cut is fed by small streams and becks mainly draining water away from the hills on the western side of Scalby and Newby. In response to major flooding on the River Derwent in 1799, a canalised beck was cut between Everley and Newby Bridge (the present day A171 road bridge that spans the beck between Newby and Scalby), thereby making Scalby Beck a distributary of the River Derwent. The Sea Cut was primarily to stop flooding in West and East Ayton further downstream. This means that water flowing in the River Derwent takes 150 miles (240 km) before reaching the sea via the Humber Estuary as opposed to the relatively short distance via the Sea Cut. This scheme, along with others in the area (straightening of the Derwent and Hertford rivers and land drainage) was promoted by Sir George Cayley and William Chapman with Robert Wilson employed as engineer for the Sea Cut navigation.

During the Ice Age, the water flowed to the sea along the course of the Sea Cut before glacial mud build up caused what is now the Derwent river to change course and lead to it flowing westwards away from the North Sea.

The Sea Cut (or New Cut) was opened on 3 September 1804 and extended to 3 miles (4.8 km) with a width of 9.1 metres (30 ft) and a drop of 41 metres (135 ft). Ten weirs were built along its length to control the energy of the floodwaters with the weir head at Everley controlling the flow of the Sea Cut by use of a sluice gate allowing floodwater over the weir when the Derwent is in spate, but maintaining the flow of water in the Derwent when dryer conditions prevail. The sluice gate at Everley is designed specifically to not allow floodwater to enter the Derwent. Instead the majority of the floodwater is diverted down the Sea Cut.

Local businessmen, entrepreneurs and farmers all gathered together to make the scheme viable as it would also provide additional land for agriculture. A new bridge was built for Mowthorp Road as part of the scheme (which is now Grade II listed) with the other crossing points in Scalby having had many bridges throughout human history, although they were all replaced in the latter part of the 19th or the early part of the 20th century (Newby Bridge was washed away in a flood in August 1890. Whitby Road Bridge (the A165 road) was rebuilt in 1906).

The beck's outfall into the North Sea was further south than where it is now. Adjacent to the Sea Life Centre at Scarborough was a coastal island known as Monkey Island. This was large enough to play cricket and football on top of it and the Sea Cut used to run between the coast and Monkey Island and enter the sea further south on the coast towards Peasholm. Monkey Island was lost to coastal erosion and the remains were finally removed in 1961 after its location became part of what is now the Scarborough Sea Life Centre.

== Route ==
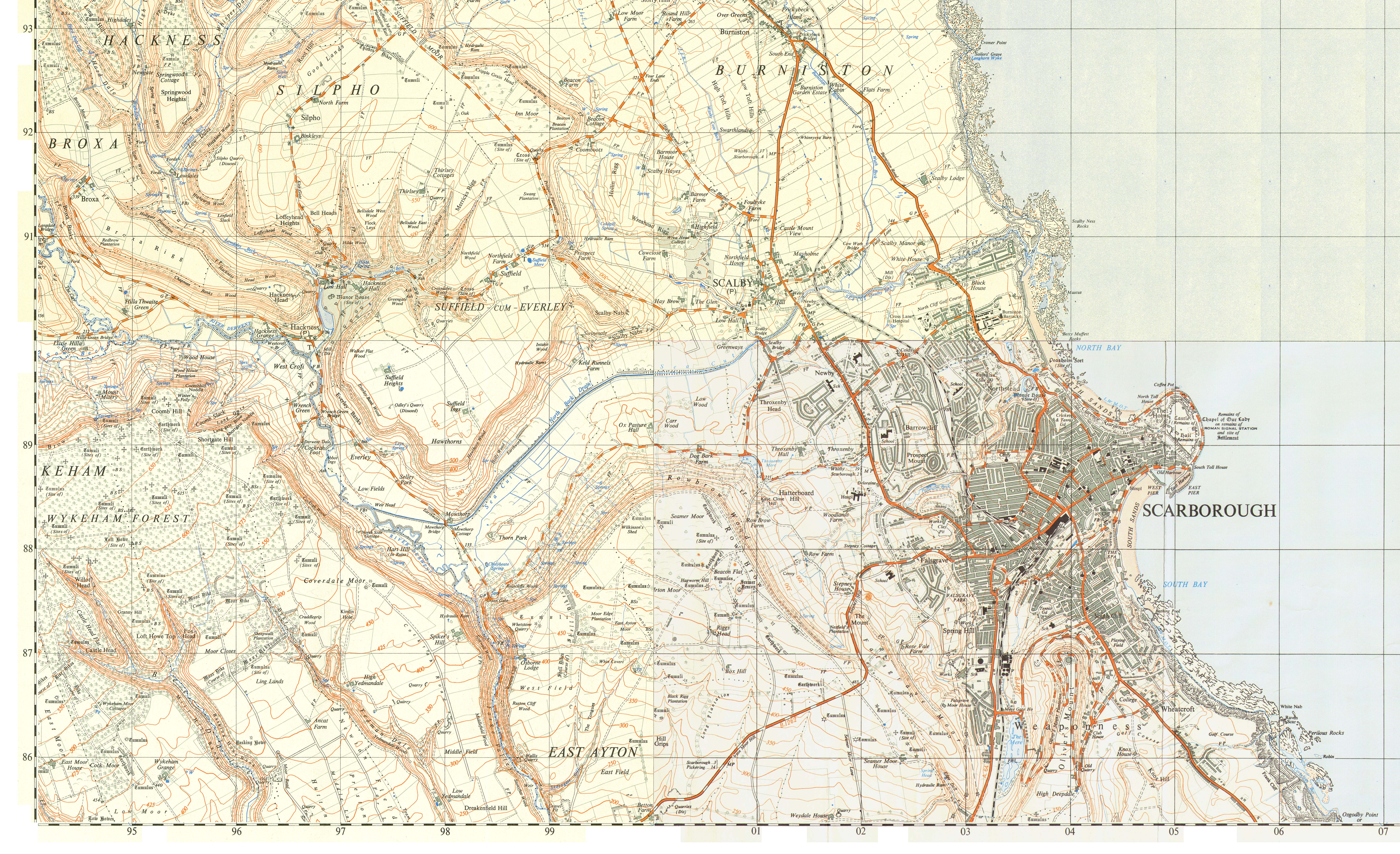
Composite 1954 map showing the course of the Sea Cut (1:25,000)

The watercourse starts in the parish of Suffield-cum-Everley near to Mowthorpe Farm. This is where the River Derwent turns south away from the coast. The Sea Cut runs for 3.1 miles (5 km) due eastwards flowing over three weirs on the way in a fairly straight sided channel as this is the cut section. It flows under Mowthorp Road (C71) and then flows north eastwards before reaching the Hackness Road (C251). This is where the canalised section ends and the last 1.9 miles (3 km) is known as Scalby Beck. Traditionally, where Church Beck joins the main watercourse, it was known as Scalby Beck.

The beck flows on underneath the A171 road at Newby Bridge; hereafter it is more of a meander as this is the natural course of water before the new cut further upstream was added. The beck then flows under the viaduct of the former Scarborough to Whitby Railway, which now carries the Cinder Track path, and the A165 road before flowing through a deep channel in heathland at Scalby Ness. It then flows under a footbridge by the Old Scalby Mills pub and enters the North Sea by the Scarborough Sea Life Centre. The footbridge carries three long distance footpaths, the Cleveland Way, the King Charles III Coast Path, and the Tabular Hills Walk.

== Industrial history ==
The Sea Cut and its banks were used to support all manner of industries.

Chief amongst these were the four mills that lined the beck, two of which are still extant; one, a former 17th century watermill, which is now a Youth Hostel on the A165 road and the Low Mill at Scalby Mills which is a public house having been converted from a mill by 1854. Of the ten watermills on the entire watercourse, seven were downstream of Newby Bridge.

High Mill, and its associated buildings, still exist as High Mill Farm and are Grade II listed. The history of milling on this site goes back to 1609 (though the current building were built in the 1840s). High Mill made good use of the increased water flow on Scalby Beck by building a mill race to power its waterwheel. The mill race has since been filled in with earth.

The corn mill that operated as Newby Bridge was opened in the mid 18th century and had closed by the 1950s. It received its corn via the railway at Scalby railway station. This mill was adjacent to the A165 bridge further downstream from Newby, but was known as Newby Bridge Mill.

Coastal surveys have identified a Smallpox isolation hospital and a rifle range in the lower reaches of the beck. The rifle range was used in the First and Second World Wars.

== Ecology ==
When the Sea Cut was drained for repairs in 2014, a colony of 100 Crayfish were removed for safety and then returned to the beck when the remediation works had taken place.

Many obstacles prevent fish from migrating up the beck (notably the weirs) and steps have been taken to alleviate this problem. In autumn 2012, a special fish pass was installed on the weir adjacent to the Burniston Road Bridge (the A165). Scalby Beck Angling Club spent £9,000 on the wooden structure which is the same as another successful fish pass installed further up the beck. Another barrier to fish migration is the weir at the mouth of the beck. There is a concrete pipe which was originally built to carry sewage and deposit it onto the beach further north. Apart from high tide, fish migration is very difficult here.

Scalby Beck provides the only substantial sea trout and salmon spawning area between the River Esk at Whitby and the Humber Estuary. Otters have also been recorded on the beck.

The lower reaches of the beck have been notified as a Site of Importance for Nature Conservation (SINC).

== Access ==
In the upper reaches of the Cut, when it makes its way across the flat terrain west of Scalby, the Cut can be accessed by paths and bridleways on both the northern and southern banks. The Tabular Hills Walk runs along the southern bank from the A171 Road bridge to Mowthorpe Farm on Mowthorp Road. The walk stretches for 48 miles (77 km) from Scalby Mills to Helmsley.

The lower reaches of the Cut from the A171 Road to the mouth are steeper and access is controlled by Scalby Beck Angling Club.

The mouth of the beck is accessible via a footbridge that carries the Cleveland Way. The mouth is also adjacent to Scalby Mills and Scarborough Sea Life Centre, so access is easy there too.

== Gallery ==
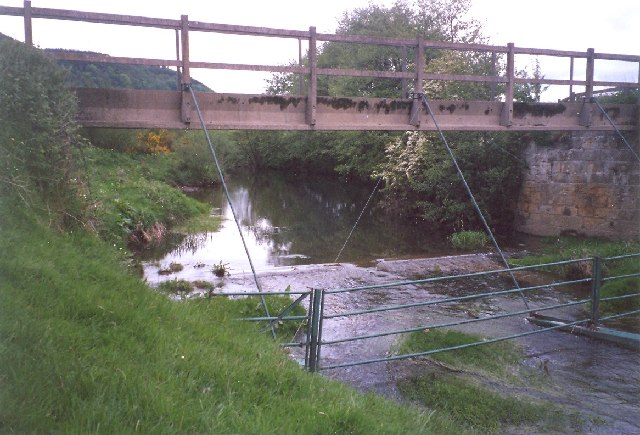
Sea Cut Weir, Suffield cum Everley; the Derwent is out of shot on the left. This view is looking north west.

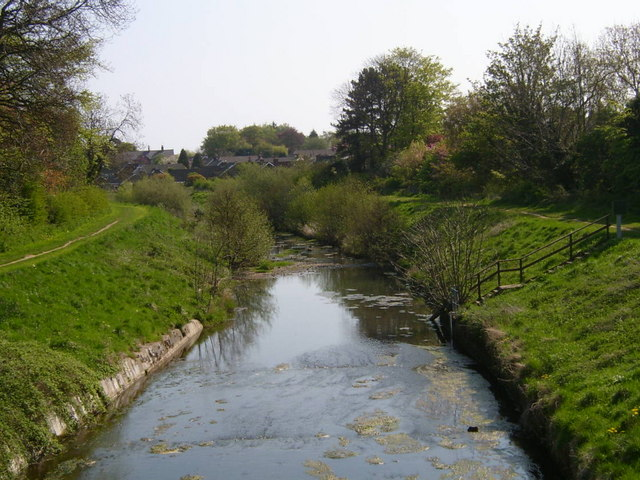
Sea Cut looking towards Scalby. The Tabular Hills Way is on the right.

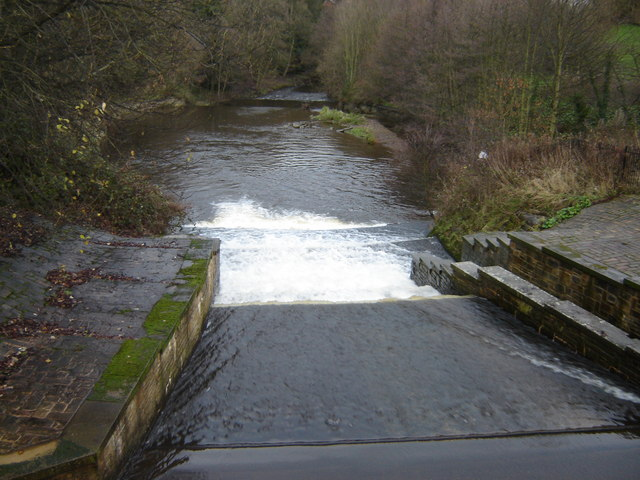
Weir on Sea Cut from A171 bridge looking east.

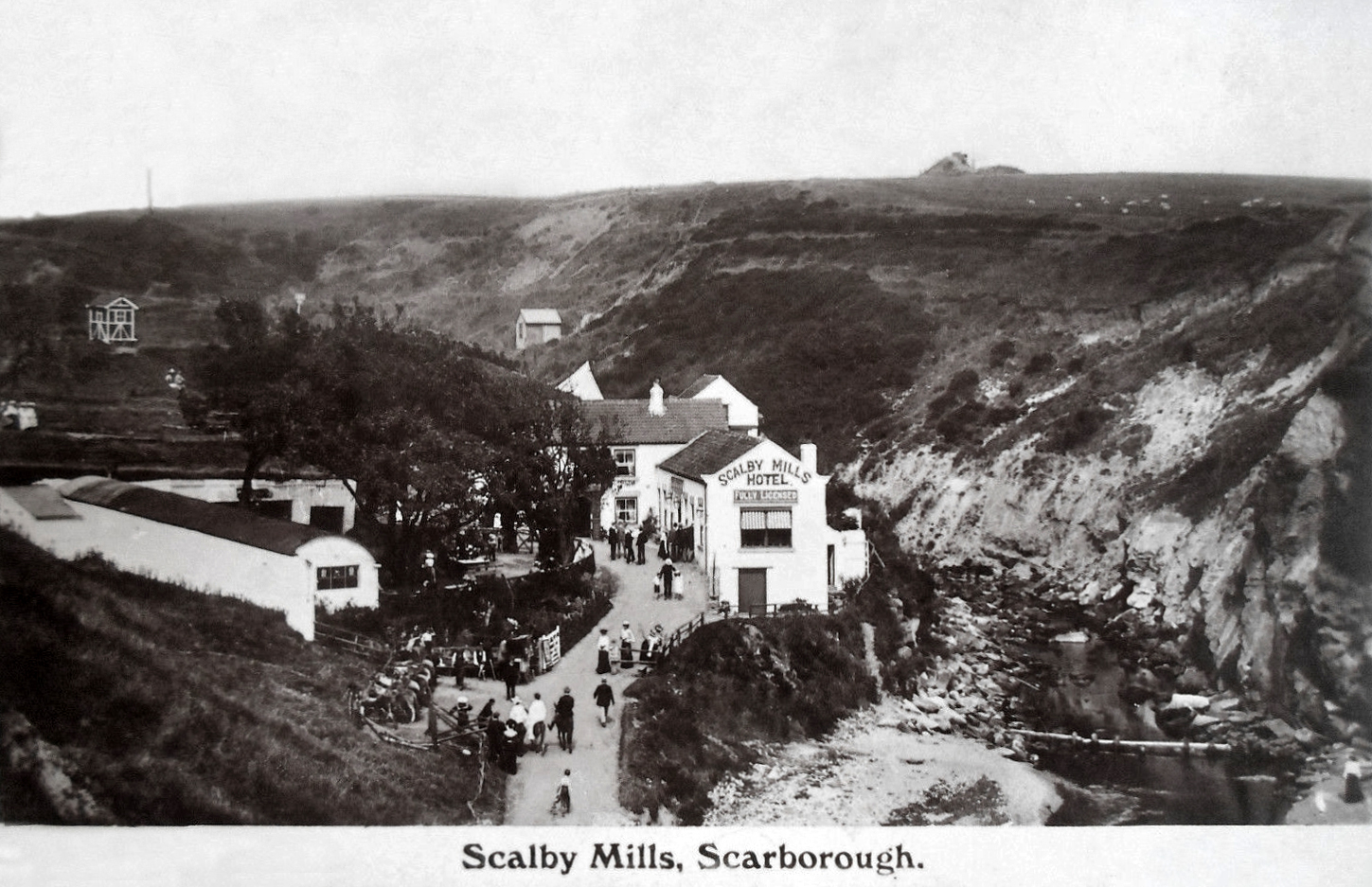
Scalby Mills, Scarborough North Yorkshire England 1901 - 1910 before the footbridge that carries the Cleveland Way was built.
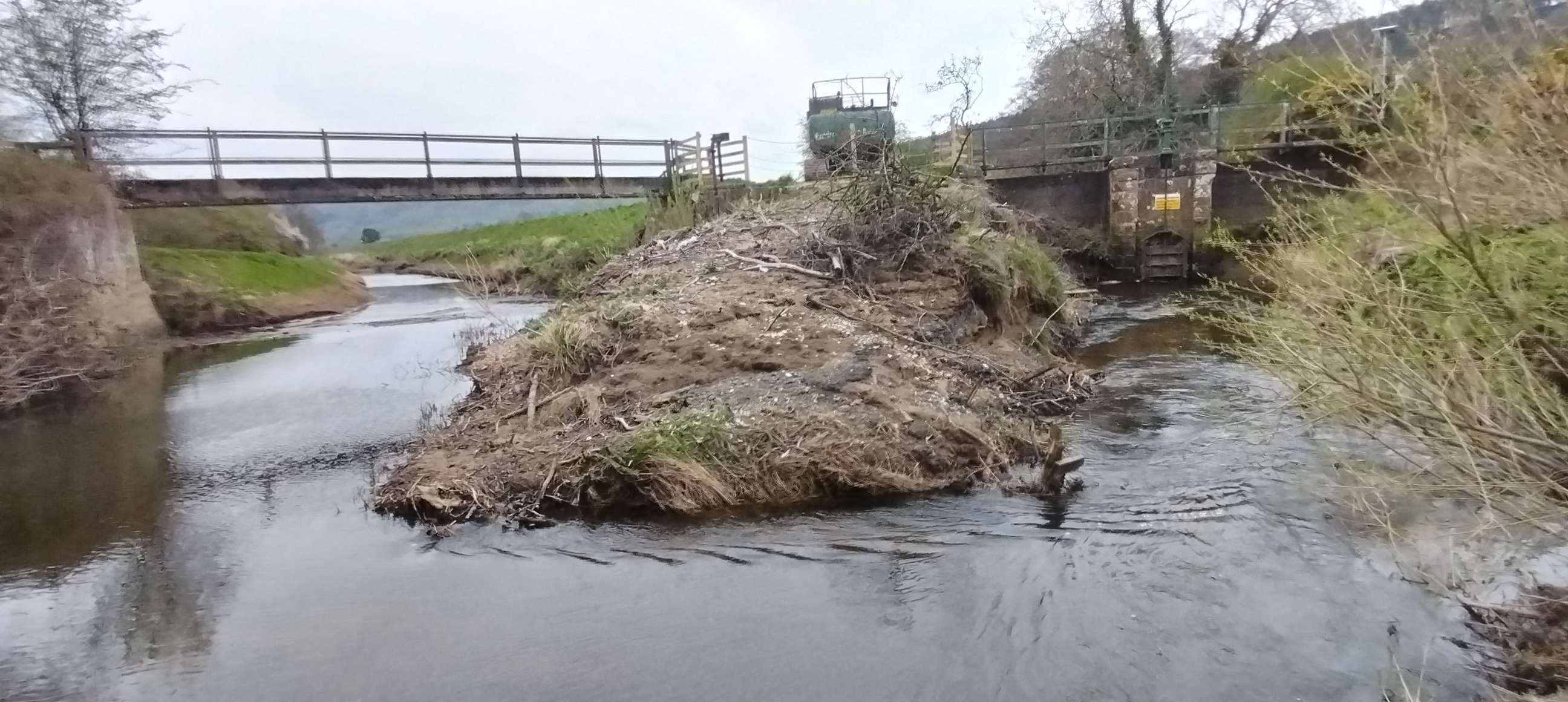
Sea Cut (left) as it diverges from the River Derwent (to the right), April 2026.

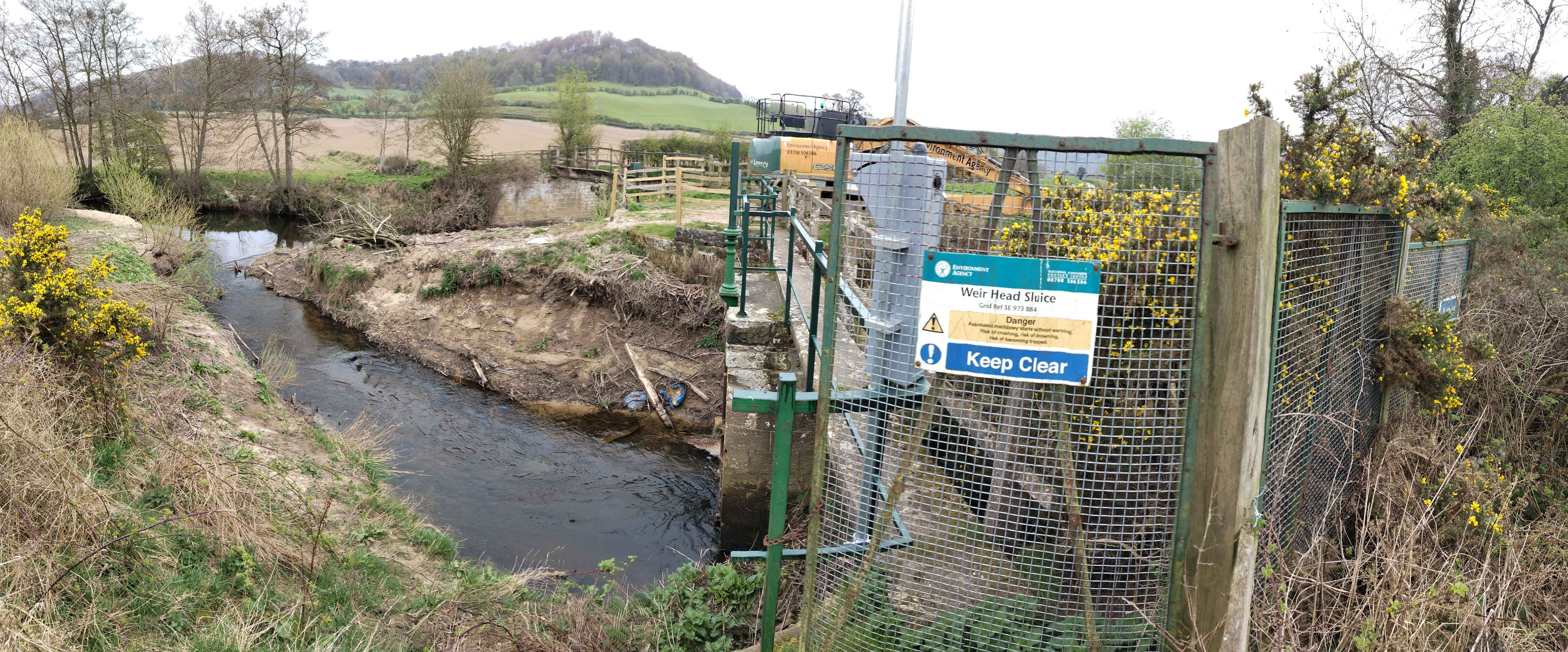
Weir Head Sluice on the River Derwent at the point of divergence; Sea Cut divergence visible in the background.

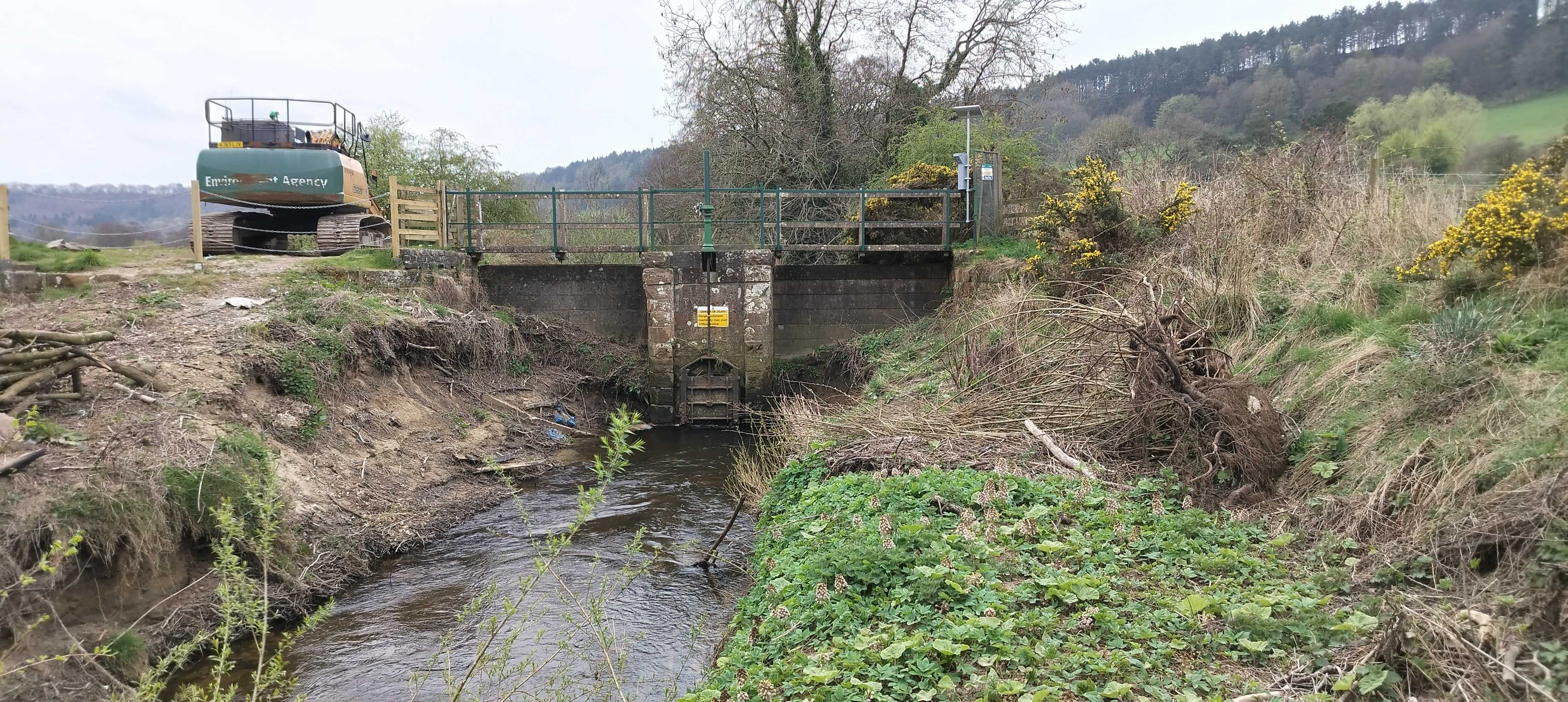
Weir Head Sluice on the River Derwent; Sea Cut (not visible) is to the left of this photo.
