= Listed buildings in Darncombe-cum-Langdale End =

Darncombe-cum-Langdale End is a civil parish in the county of North Yorkshire, England. It contains three listed buildings that are recorded in the National Heritage List for England. All the listed buildings are designated at Grade II, the lowest of the three grades, which is applied to "buildings of national importance and special interest". The parish contains the settlement of Langdale End and the surrounding countryside, and the listed buildings consist of a farmhouse and a barn, a public house and outbuildings and a telephone kiosk.

== Buildings ==
Name and location	Photograph	Date	Notes
Bridge Farmhouse and barn 54.30554°N 0.55459°W		Late 17th to early 18th century	The farmhouse is in limestone, and has a pantile roof with coped gables and shaped kneelers. It has a two-storey single-bay range with an outbuilding to the left, and a taller two-storey single-bay range to the right. In the outbuilding is a casement window, and the other windows are sashes, some of them horizontally-sliding. Further to the right, the barn, which was added in the early 19th century, is in sandstone with a slate roof. It has two storeys and contains a stable door.
The Moorcock Inn and outbuildings 54.30842°N 0.55847°W		Late 18th century	A farmhouse and farm buildings, later a public house and outbuildings, in sandstone with stepped eaves and a pantile roof. The main block has two low storeys, two bays, with flanking single-storey extensions. On the front are two doorways, and the windows are sashes, mainly horizontal-sliding, those in the ground floor with tooled stone lintels, and in the upper floor the lintels are timber.
Telephone kiosk 54.30835°N 0.55764°W		1935	The K6 type telephone kiosk was designed by Giles Gilbert Scott. Constructed in cast iron with a square plan and a dome, it has three unperforated crowns in the top panels.
