= Darncombe-cum-Langdale End =

Civil parish in North Yorkshire, England

Coordinates: 54.3085°N 0.5683°W

- Civil parish
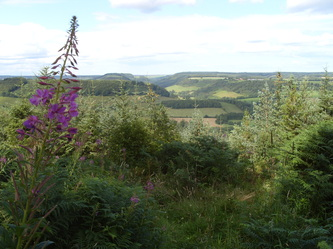

- Population: 42 (2001 census)
- OS grid reference: SE932912
- Civil parish: Darncombe-cum-Langdale End
- Unitary authority: North Yorkshire
- Ceremonial county: North Yorkshire
- Region: Yorkshire and the Humber
- Country: England
- Sovereign state: United Kingdom
- Post town: SCARBOROUGH
- Postcode district: YO13
- Police: North Yorkshire
- Fire: North Yorkshire
- Ambulance: Yorkshire
- UK Parliament: Scarborough and Whitby

Darncombe-cum-Langdale End is a civil parish in the county of North Yorkshire, England.

According to the 2001 UK census, Darncombe-cum-Langdale End parish had a population of 42. The population remained at less than 100 according to the 2011 census. Details are included in the civil parish of Hackness.

In June 2004, the village became the first location in Britain, to become home to a Coptic Orthodox Church of Alexandria monastery (St Athanasius) at the manor house.

The parish council is Hackness & Harwood Dale Group Parish Council which covers the six parishes of Broxa-cum-Troutsdale, Darncombe-cum-Langdale End, Hackness, Harwood Dale, Silpho and Suffield-cum-Everley.

From 1974 to 2023 it was part of the Borough of Scarborough, it is now administered by the unitary North Yorkshire Council.

The Moorcock Inn lies in Langdale End. Also in the village is St Peter's Church, Langdale End.

== See also ==
- Listed buildings in Darncombe-cum-Langdale End
