= Listed buildings in Harwood Dale =

Harwood Dale is a civil parish in the county of North Yorkshire, England. It contains eight listed buildings that are recorded in the National Heritage List for England. All the listed buildings are designated at Grade II, the lowest of the three grades, which is applied to "buildings of national importance and special interest". The parish contains the village of Harwood Dale and the surrounding countryside, and the listed buildings consist of farmhouses, a ruined church, a smithy and a telephone kiosk.

== Buildings ==
Name and location	Photograph	Date	Notes
Old St Margaret's Church and wall 54.35583°N 0.53665°W		1634	The church, now a ruin, is in grey sandstone and is without a roof. It has a rectangular plan, with a south porch and a west bellcote. At the east end is a three-light window with a transom, and the west end has a two-light round-arched window with a keystone. In the north wall are two-light windows, and a blocked doorway with an ogee arch. All the windows have chamfered frames and mullions.
Thirley Beck Farmhouse; 54.33907°N 0.48812°W	—	1643	The farmhouse, which has been altered, is in stone on a chamfered plinth, and has a pantile roof with chamfered coping and moulded kneelers. There are two storeys and attics, three bays, and outshuts. In the centre is a gabled porch, and a doorway with a chamfered surround and a triangular head. In the ground floor are three-light mullioned windows and fire windows, the upper floor contains casement windows, and in the roof are 20th-century dormers.
Chapel Farmhouse and The Cruck House; 54.35720°N 0.53588°W	—	Early 18th century	The former farmhouse, dairy and barn are in sandstone, and have a pantile roof with coped gables and plain kneelers. There are two storeys, four bays, and a single-storey extension to the right. On the front is a gabled porch, and the windows are sashes, all but one horizontally-sliding. In the left gable wall is a doorway with a sundial above and a fire window, and in the former barn is a blocked segmental cart arch. Inside, there is an inglenook fireplace.
Murk Head Farmhouse; 54.34820°N 0.53861°W	—	c. 1740	The farmhouse is in grey sandstone, and has a slate roof with coped gables and plain kneelers. There are two storeys and an attic, and three bays. In the centre is a doorcase with a dentilled open pediment on panelled pilasters, and the doorway is in a round-arched opening with a keystone, and has a rectangular fanlight. The windows are pivoted, and have lintels with keystones.
Thirley Banks Cottage; 54.34164°N 0.49852°W	—	c. 1800	A farmhouse, later a private house, in sandstone, with a pantile roof and a stone ridge, coping and moulded kneelers. There are two storeys, three bays, and a later rear outshut. In the centre is a doorway with a rectangular fanlight, and the windows are a mix of sashes and casements. All the openings have lintels with keystones.
Thirley Cote Farmhouse; 54.34175°N 0.50041°W	—	Early 19th century	The farmhouse is in grey sandstone, and has a slate roof with stone coped gables and plain kneelers. There are two storeys, a double depth plan, and two bays. In the centre is a lean-to porch, and the windows are sashes.
Smithy; 54.34893°N 0.52011°W	—	Mid 19th century	The smithy is in stone, and has a pantile roof with a coped gable on the right. There is a single storey, and the openings include doorways and windows, one a sash window. All the openings have plain lintels.
Telephone kiosk 54.34900°N 0.52055°W		1935	The K6 type telephone kiosk was designed by Giles Gilbert Scott. Constructed in cast iron with a square plan and a dome, it has three unperforated crowns in the top panels.
