= Moorcock Inn =

Moorcock Inn may refer to the following buildings in England:

- Moorcock Inn, Hawes, near Garsdale railway station, in North Yorkshire
- Moorcock Inn, Langdale End, in North Yorkshire
- Moor Cock Inn and barn, a listed building in Luddendenfoot, West Yorkshire
