= St Peter's Church, Langdale End =

Church in Langdale End, North Yorkshire, England

Coordinates: 54°18′24″N 0°33′21″W

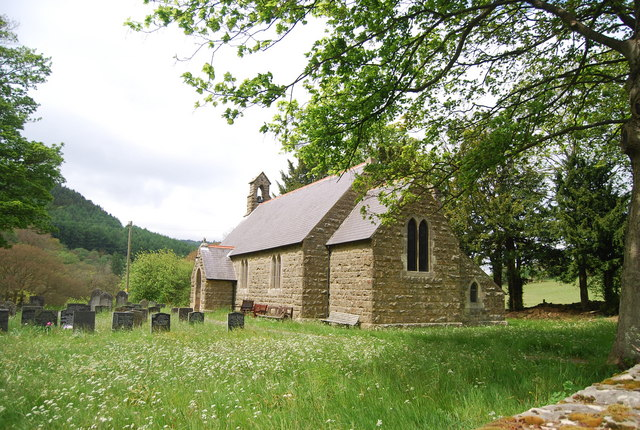
The church, in 2010

St Peter's Church is an Anglican church in Darncombe-cum-Langdale End, a village in North Yorkshire, in England.

The building is a chapel of ease to St Helen and All Saints' Church, Wykeham. It was built in 1884, for Viscountess Downe, at a cost of £750. It is a Gothic Revival building, in the 13th century style. In the churchyard is a large cross, dedicated to G. C. Dawnay, who died in 1889.

The church is a small, rectangular, stone building, with a nave, chancel and south porch. At the west end is a bellcote.
