= Old St Margaret's Church, Harwood Dale =

Ruined church in Harwood Dale, North Yorkshire, England

Coordinates: 54°21′21″N 0°32′12″W

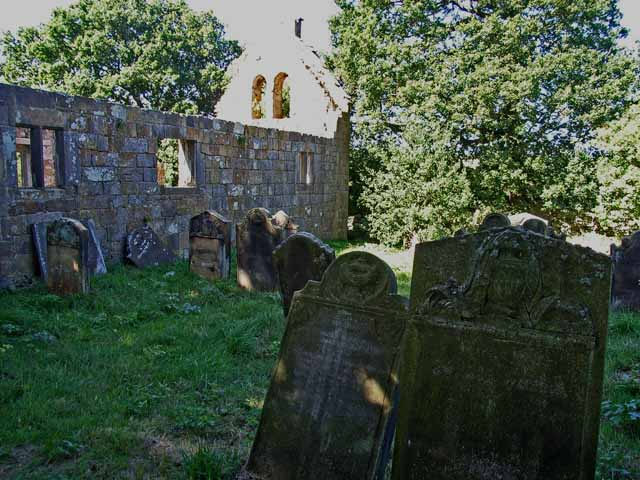
The building, in 2006

Old St Margaret's Church is a ruined Anglican church in Harwood Dale, a village in North Yorkshire, in England.

The church was built in 1634 for Thomas Posthumous Hoby, in memory of his wife. In 1862, it was replaced by the current St Margaret's Church, Harwood Dale, a mile down the valley, and it gradually fell into ruin. The surviving ruins were consolidated in the later 20th century. They were grade II listed in 1967, and the site was made a scheduled monument in 2004. Despite this, the structure suffered further damage, and some stones were stolen, leading to access to the site being restricted.

The church is built of grey sandstone and has no roof. It has a rectangular plan, measuring 13.9m by 4.6m, with a south porch and a west bellcote. At the east end is a three-light window with a transom, and the west end has a two-light round-arched window with a keystone. In the north wall are two-light windows, and a blocked doorway with an ogee arch. All the windows have chamfered frames and mullions. No internal features survive, although there are traces of plaster on the walls.

== See also ==
- Listed buildings in Harwood Dale
