= Broxa-cum-Troutsdale =

Civil parish in North Yorkshire, England

Coordinates: 54.3085°N 0.551677°W

- Civil parish
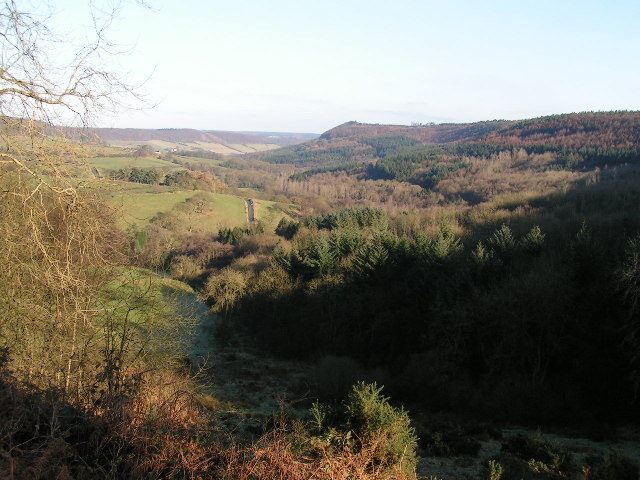

- Population: 44 (2001 census)
- OS grid reference: SE943912
- Civil parish: Broxa-cum-Troutsdale
- Unitary authority: North Yorkshire
- Ceremonial county: North Yorkshire
- Region: Yorkshire and the Humber
- Country: England
- Sovereign state: United Kingdom
- Post town: SCARBOROUGH
- Postcode district: YO13
- Police: North Yorkshire
- Fire: North Yorkshire
- Ambulance: Yorkshire
- UK Parliament: Scarborough and Whitby

Broxa-cum-Troutsdale is a civil parish in the county of North Yorkshire, England. The population as of the 2011 census remained less than 100. Details are included in the civil parish of Hackness. The parish includes the village of Broxa, and covers part of Troutsdale.

According to the 2001 UK census, Broxa-cum-Troutsdale parish had a population of 44.

The parish council is Hackness & Harwood Dale Group Parish Council which covers the six parishes of Broxa-cum-Troutsdale, Darncombe-cum-Langdale End, Hackness, Harwood Dale, Silpho and Suffield-cum-Everley.

From 1974 to 2023 it was part of the Borough of Scarborough, it is now administered by the unitary North Yorkshire Council.

== See also ==
- Listed buildings in Broxa-cum-Troutsdale
