= St Peter's Church, Hackness =

Church in North Yorkshire, England

Coordinates: 54°18′05″N 0°30′44″W

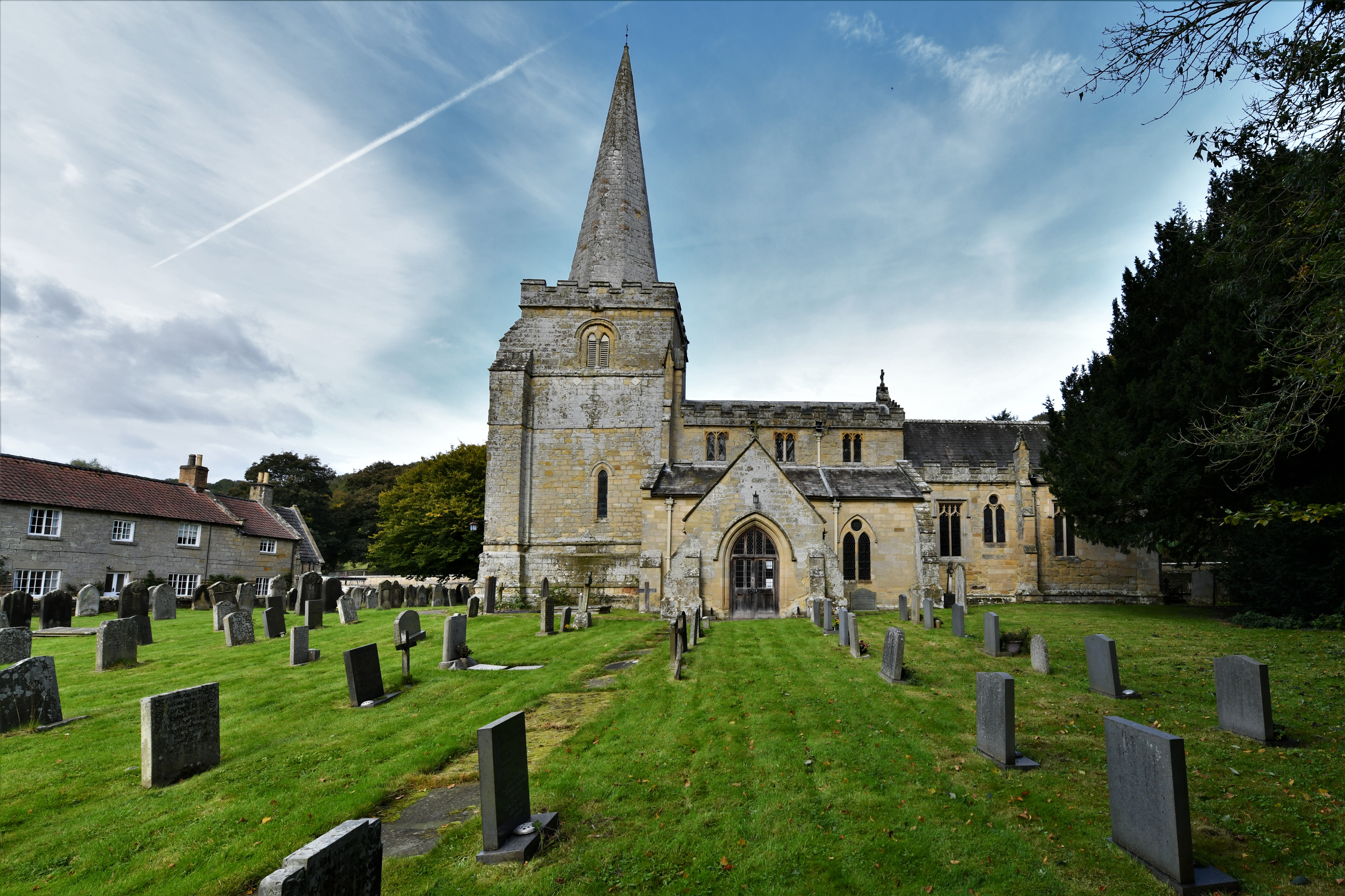
The church, in 2020

St Peter's Church is the parish church of Hackness, a village in North Yorkshire, in England.

A nunnery was founded in Hackness by Hilda of Whitby, in about 680. By the 11th century, there were three churches in the village, one of which was St Peter's Church, on the site of the former nunnery. The chancel arch survives from this period. The south arcade was added in the early 12th century, followed later in the century by the north arcade, tower and tower arch. The chancel, clerestory, spire and battlements were added in the 15th century, and then in the 17th century a vestry was added, along with a window in the north chapel. In 1870 a porch was added, and the aisles were rebuilt. The church was grade I listed in 1967.

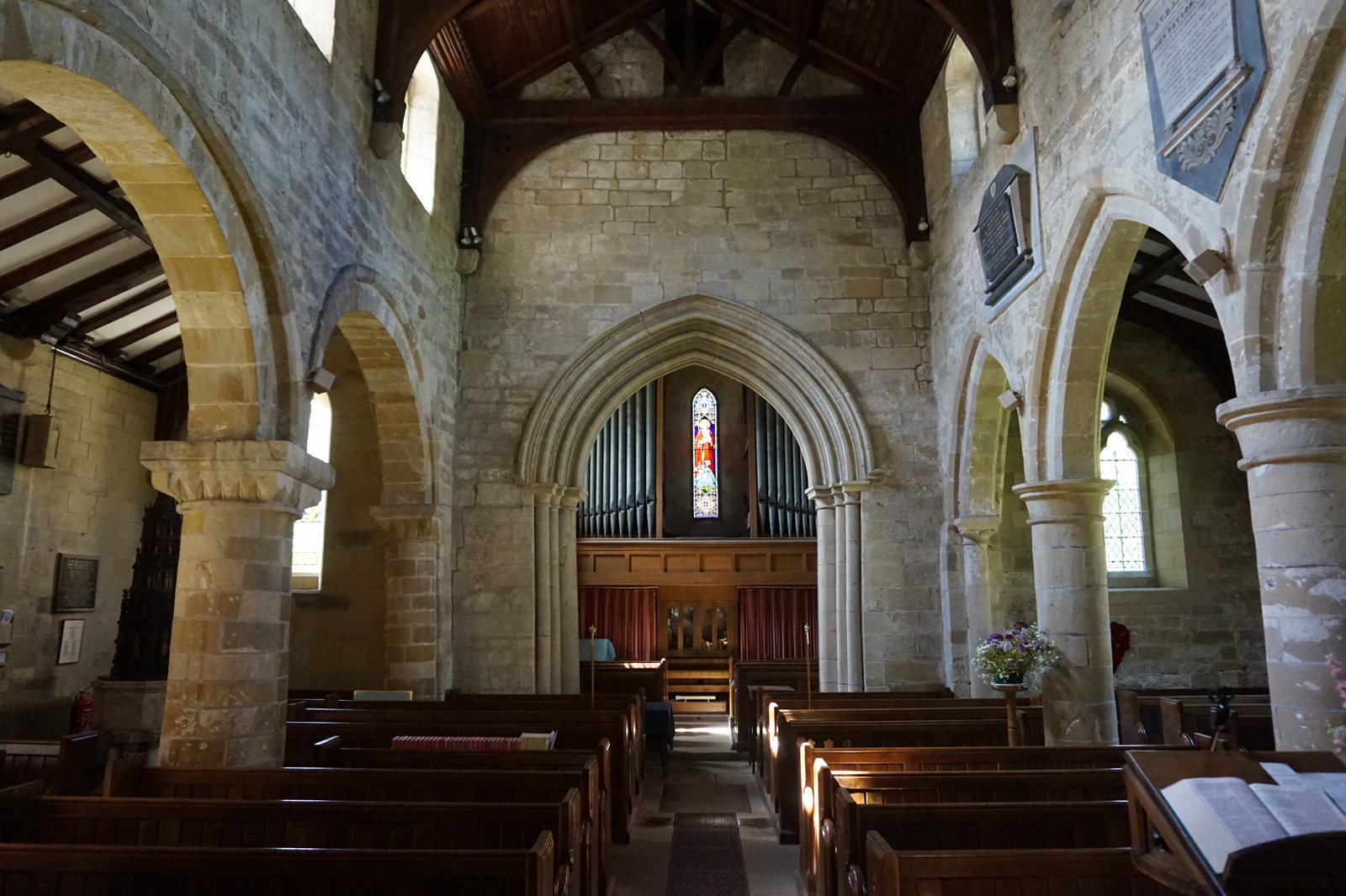
View from the nave into the chancel

The church is built in sandstone with a slate roof, and consists of a nave with a clerestory, north and south aisles, a south porch, a chancel with a north chapel and vestry, and a west steeple. The steeple has a tower with three stages, a chamfered plinth, a stair turret at the southwest, angle buttresses, chamfered bands, lancet windows, paired bell openings with pointed heads under round arches and hood moulds, an embattled parapet, and a recessed octagonal spire. Inside, there is the Anglo-Saxon Hackness Cross, eight 15th-century misericords, and a font cover of similar date on a 19th-century font. There are several monuments of interest from 1592 on, including one by Francis Leggatt Chantrey.

== See also ==
- Grade I listed buildings in North Yorkshire (district)
- Listed buildings in Hackness
