= Listed buildings in Silpho =

Silpho is a civil parish in the county of North Yorkshire, England. It contains four listed buildings that are recorded in the National Heritage List for England. All the listed buildings are designated at Grade II, the lowest of the three grades, which is applied to "buildings of national importance and special interest". The parish contains the village of Silpho and the surrounding area. All the listed buildings are in the village, and consist of a cottage and outbuildings, a farmhouse, a water tower and a telephone kiosk.

== Buildings ==
Name and location	Photograph	Date	Notes
Pond Cottage and outbuildings 54.31513°N 0.51844°W		Early 17th century	A longhouse and byre, later a cottage and outbuildings, it is in sandstone, with quoins, and a pantile roof with coped gables. There is a single storey and attic, the cottage has three bays and the outbuildings have two. The house has a doorway, horizontally sliding sash windows, and two half-dormers with scalloped bargeboards, and the outbuildings have doorways with heavy lintels.
Binkley's Farmhouse; 54.31392°N 0.51740°W		Early 19th century	The farmhouse is in sandstone, and has a pantile roof with coped gables and plain kneelers. There are two storeys and four bays, and a single-bay extension to the right. The doorway has a divided fanlight, and the windows are sashes.
Water tower 54.31560°N 0.51796°W		Early to mid-19th century	The water tower is in limestone on a plinth, with quoins and a pitched slate roof. There are two stages and a doorway in each stage.
Telephone kiosk 54.31557°N 0.51800°W	—	1935	The telephone kiosk is of the K6 type designed by Giles Gilbert Scott. Constructed in cast iron with a square plan and a dome, it has three unperforated crowns in the top panels.
