= Lady Margaret Hoby =

English diarist (1571–1633)

Margaret, Lady Hoby née Dakins (1571 – 4 September 1633) was an English diarist of the Elizabethan period. Hers is the earliest known diary written by a woman in English. She had a Puritan upbringing. Her diary covering the period 1599–1605 reflects much religious observance, but gives little insight into the writer's private feelings.

== Life ==
Margaret Dakins was born before 10 February 1571 (the date of her baptism), the only child of a landed gentleman, Arthur Dakins (c. 1517–1592) of Linton, East Riding of Yorkshire, and his wife, Thomasine Gye (died 1613). She was baptised at Wintringham Church.

Margaret was educated in the household of Katherine Hastings, Countess of Huntingdon, a devout Protestant with Puritan leanings, who ran a school for young gentlewomen. Penelope and Dorothy Devereux, the daughters of Margaret's future father-in-law, Walter Devereux, 1st Earl of Essex, also attended the school. She was well-liked by Henry Hastings, 3rd Earl of Huntingdon, who provided a portion of her dower.

As an heiress, Margaret was a valuable commodity on the Elizabethan marriage market. Her first husband was Walter Devereux, the younger son of Essex and a court favourite of Queen Elizabeth I, whom she married between 1588 and May 1589. The manor and parsonage of Hackness near Scarborough in the North Riding were purchased for the couple, and remained Margaret's property after the death of Devereux at the siege of Rouen on 8 September 1591.

Three months later, Margaret was courted unsuccessfully by Sir Thomas Posthumous Hoby, son of the translator and English ambassador to France Sir Thomas Hoby (p. 75). She married at that juncture Sir Thomas Sidney, the younger brother of Philip Sidney and Robert Sidney, but after Sidney died in 1595, she next married Hoby after all, on 9 August 1596. They lived at Hackness, but had no children. Margaret spent much of her time there in the company of a confessor, Richard Rhodes. She went round tending the sick and infirm in her own community, while running her household and recording detailed household accounts. The activities reported in her diary reflect profound religious beliefs.

== The diary ==
Margaret Hoby's diary – the earliest known by an Englishwoman (1599–1605) – gives a notable account of the domestic disciplines of Elizabethan puritanism, along with the religious exercises and prayers for the whole household and the private prayers and reading, in which she was guided by her chaplain, Richard Rhodes. It was written as a pious exercise, and as such, presaged a school of religious soul-searching in diary form that continued into the 18th century.

The importance to Hoby of religious observance is apparent in much of the diary: "After private prayers I did eat my breakfast and then went to church: after, I came home and prayed, then I dined and, when I had talked a while with some of my neighbours, I went again to church: and, after the sermon, I went about the house and took order for diverse things which were to be done in my absence, and, at five o'clock, I returned to private prayer and meditation. After I went to supper, then to lector, and so to bed."

The diary also shed light on the management of the estate in her husband's frequent absences: supervising and paying servants, sorting linen, playing music, gardening, giving medical advice and treating neighbours and tenants. It tells little about the writer's private feelings. References to Sir Thomas Hoby are formal, though Margaret was strong-minded enough to resist until 1632 his request that she make over her Hackness and other properties to him and his heirs. She had no children herself. As with the diary of Samuel Pepys later in the 17th century, the day's entry often ends with the phrase, "And so to bed."

== Memorials ==
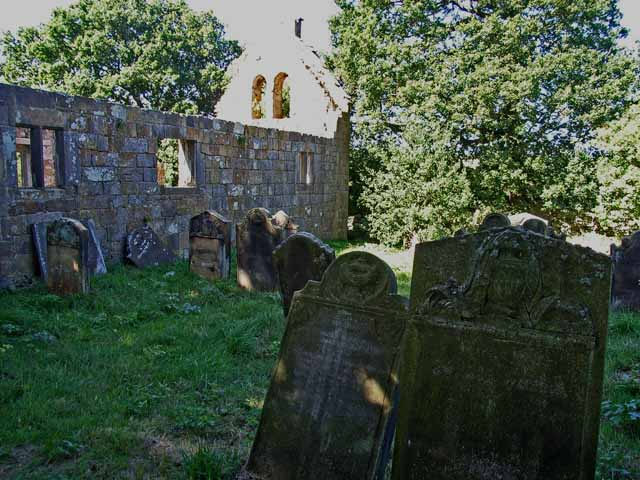
Old St Margaret's Church in Harwood Dale

Margaret Hoby visited York and London several times during the years covered by her diary, but it makes little reference to public events. Margaret died on 4 September 1633 and was buried on 6 September in the chancel of St Peter's Church, Hackness, where her husband erected an alabaster monument to her. It survives, but St Margaret's Chapel in Harwood Dale, which Hoby also built to her memory, is in ruins. Her husband died in 1640 leaving his manor at Hackness to the son of his first cousin named John Sydenham, whose son, Sir John Posthumous Sydenham, erected a monument to Hoby in Hackness Church. There is also a memorial window to him in All Saints' Church, Bisham, Berkshire.

== Sources ==
- Dorothy M. Meads (ed.), The Diary of Lady Margaret Hoby 1599-1605 (London: Routledge, 1930)
- Joanna Moody (ed.), The Private Life of an Elizabethan Lady: The Diary of Lady Margaret Hoby 1599-1605 (Phoenix Mill: Sutton, 1998)ISBN 0-7509-1349-5
- Sylvia Freedman, Poor Penelope: Lady Penelope Rich. An Elizabethan Woman (Abbotsbrook, Bucks: Kensal Press, 1983). ISBN 0-946041-20-2
- Hoby, Lady Margaret. In: A Historical Dictionary of British Women (London: Europa, 2003). ISBN 1-85743-228-2
- "Hoby [née Dakins], Margaret, 1571–1633". The Cambridge Guide to Women's Writing in English (1 ed.). Cambridge, UK: Cambridge University Press. 1999. ISBN 9780521495257.
- Thomas Posthumous Hoby. Secret-bases site, UK Retrieved 24 September 2011.
- Paul Slack, "Hoby, Margaret, Lady Hoby (bap. 1571, d. 1633)", rev. Oxford Dictionary of National Biography (Oxford, UK: OUP, 2004). Retrieved 3 November 2011. Subscription required.
- Cambridge University Orlando project page on Hoby. Subscription required.
- University of Victoria biography
