= Arthur Irvin =

English cricketer and clergyman

Personal information
- Full name: Arthur John Edward Irvin
- Born: 10 March 1848; Hackness, Yorkshire, England
- Died: 22 July 1945 (aged 97); Old Basing, Hampshire, England
- Batting: Right-handed
- Role: Wicket-keeper

Domestic team information
- Years: Team
- 1868–1871: Oxford University

Career statistics
Competition	First-class
Matches	2
Runs scored	18
Batting average	9.00
100s/50s	–/–
Top score	12
Catches/stumpings	4/1
- Source: Cricinfo, 9 February 2020

Arthur John Edward Irvin (10 March 1848 – 22 July 1945) was an English first-class cricketer and clergyman.

The son of The Reverend Joseph Irvin, he was born in March 1848 at Hackness, Yorkshire. He was educated at Rossall School, matriculating at Pembroke College, Oxford in 1867, and graduating B.A. in 1873. While studying at Oxford, he made two appearances in first-class cricket as a wicket-keeper for Oxford University against Southgate in 1868, and the Gentlemen of England in 1871.

After graduating from Oxford, he took holy orders in the Church of England in 1874. His first ecclesiastical post was as curate of Rothwell, which he held until 1877, before becoming the vicar of Woodlesford in 1877. He served on the Hunslet Rural District council in 1895, in addition to being closely associated with the establishment of a new workhouse at Woodlesford, which would later become St. George's Hospital. Irvin retired to Oxford, before settling at Old Basing, Hampshire. He died there in July 1945, at the age of 97.
