= Begu (nun) =

Nun
- Born: Hackness, Yorkshire
- Died: 31 October 690
- Venerated in: Anglican Communion; Roman Catholic Church; Eastern Orthodox Church
- Feast: 31 October

Saint Begu (died 31 October 690) was a nun and later became a saint from Hackness, Yorkshire (Deira). She served at the monastic cell in the nunnery of Hackness, near Scarborough which was built by St Hilda of Whitby shortly before her death.

According to Bede, Begu was the woman who claimed to have witnessed Hilda's soul being borne to heaven by angels when Hilda died on 17 November 680. Tradition states that at the moment of Hilda's passing, the bells tolled. Begu awoke to find her fellow sisters in the dormitory sleeping; it is then that Begu stated she witnessed the vision of the roof of the house opening and Hilda's soul been borne into heaven. The nuns awakened and prayed for the soul of the blessed abbess until, at dawn, some monks arrived to tell them of her death.

Years after the death of Begu herself, the monks of Whitby Abbey were seeking holy relics to replace those of Hilda in 1125, as they were transferred to Glastonbury Abbey due to the 10th century Viking raids. Through a supposed revelation, a sarcophagus was uncovered at Hackness where Begu had served. It bore the inscription Hoc est sepulchrum Begu, the contents were transferred to nearby Whitby where miracles were soon reported.
