= Hackness Hall =

House in North Yorkshire, England

Coordinates: 54.3012°N 0.5092°W

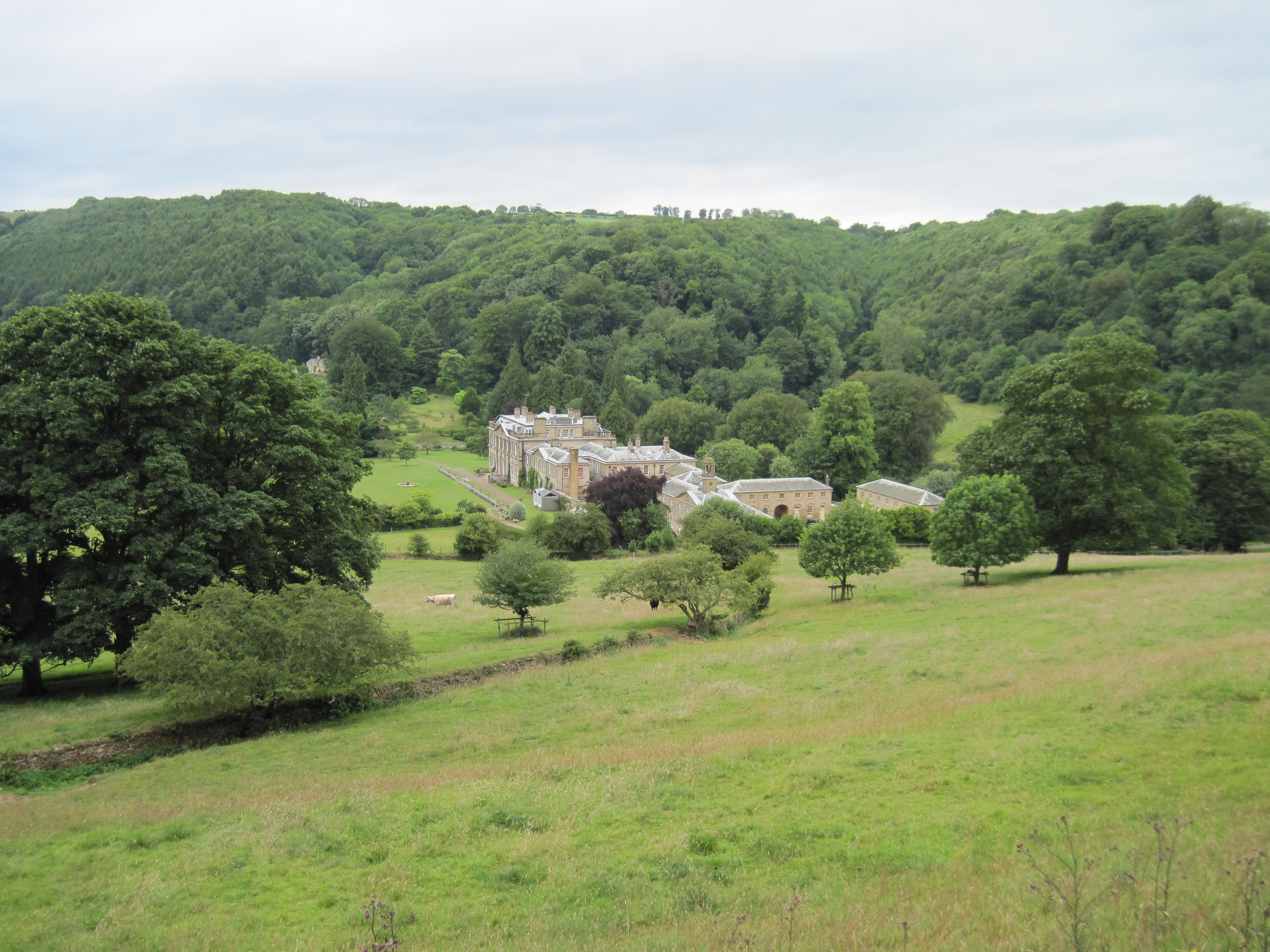
The hall, in 2009

Hackness Hall is a historic building in Hackness, a village in North Yorkshire, in England.

A timber-framed manor house was built in Hackness in the late mediaeval period, replaced by a new house in about 1600. Between 1791 and 1796, Richard Vanden-Bempde-Johnstone commissioned a new hall, perhaps designed by Peter Atkinson, while John Carr designed the outbuildings. In 1798, Johnstone demolished the Elizabethan hall. The building was extended in 1810, with the wings enlarged and a new entrance created. The hall was gutted by fire in 1910, but it was restored the following year by Walter Brierley, who kept the facades unchanged. The building was grade I listed in 1951.

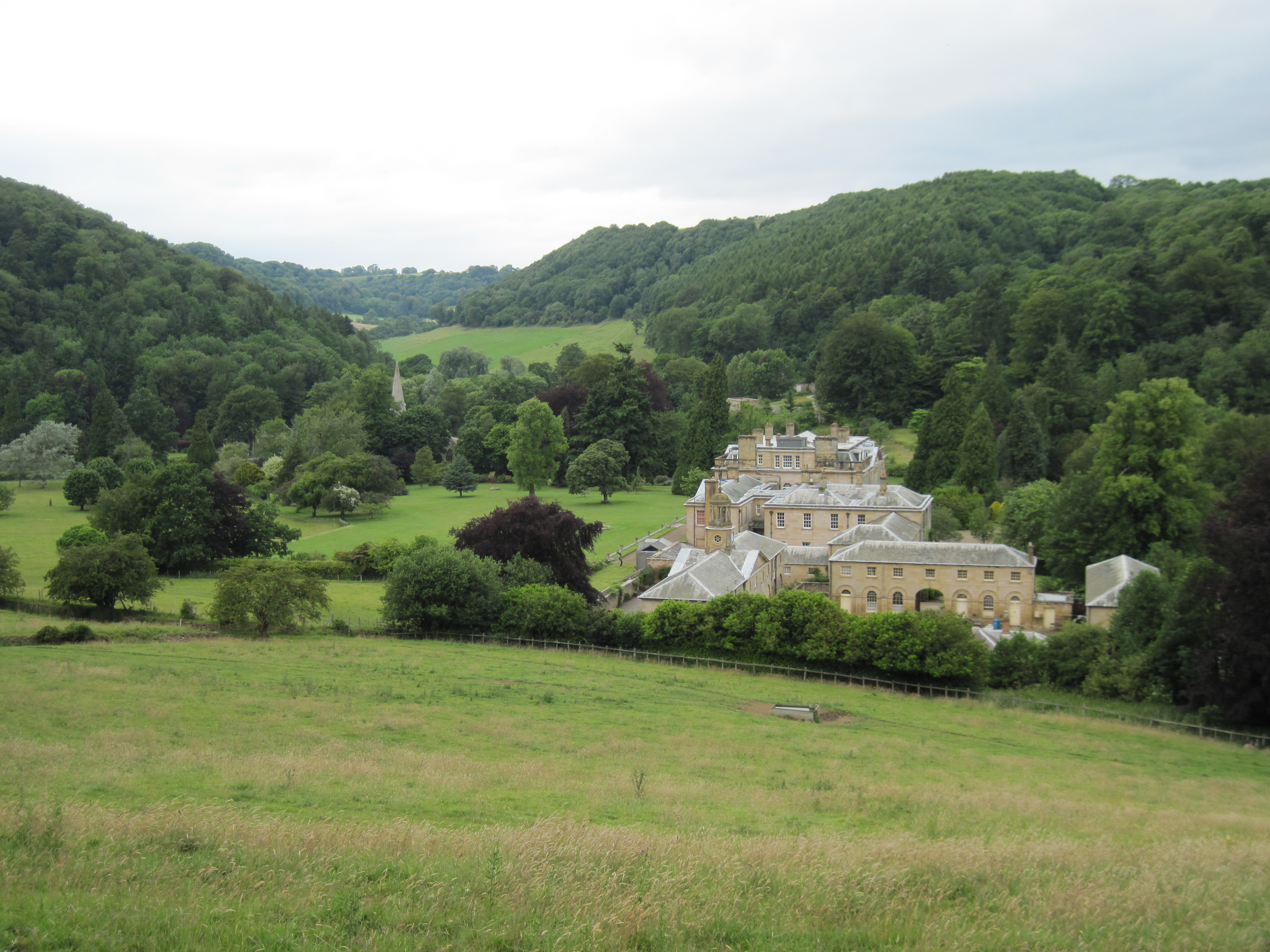
The stable yard

The house is built of sandstone with slate roofs. The entrance front has two storeys and seven bays, and a lower L-shaped wing to the left. The middle three bays project under a pediment, and in the centre is a pedimented porch with fluted Doric columns, in antis, containing double doors, over which is a decorated panel. Above the doorway is a tripartite sash window with Ionic columns, a frieze with swags, and a segmental pediment. The other windows are sashes in architraves with modillion cornices. On the front is a pulvinated frieze, sill bands, dentilled eaves, a modillion cornice, and a balustraded parapet. The garden front has seven bays, the middle three bays projecting, with four giant fluted Ionic pilasters, and a tympanum containing an escutcheon in high relief. The terrace railings are decorative and in cast iron. Inside, the octagonal room retains an 18th century fireplace, while the drawing room is a replica of the original, designed by Brierley. Other key features introduced by Brierley are the cantilevered staircase and the fireplace in the dining room.

Immediately southeast of the hall is the grade II listed stable yard, designed by Carr. The stables, carriage sheds and workshops are built of sandstone with slate roofs, and form four ranges round a courtyard. The main range has two storeys on a plinth, and nine arcaded bays, the middle three bays projecting under a pediment. In the centre is a carriage arch, flanked by recessed windows with arches of shaped voussoirs, and in the upper floor are sash windows. Above is a moulded eaves cornice, and raking cornices to the pediment that contains an oculus with keystones in the tympanum. In the centre of the hipped roof is a cupola with a weathervane. Associated with other ranges are two pumps, each with a lead plaque containing a family crest.

== See also ==
- Grade I listed buildings in North Yorkshire (district)
- Listed buildings in Hackness
