= Hackness =

Village and civil parish in North Yorkshire, England

Coordinates: 54°17′47″N 0°30′55″W

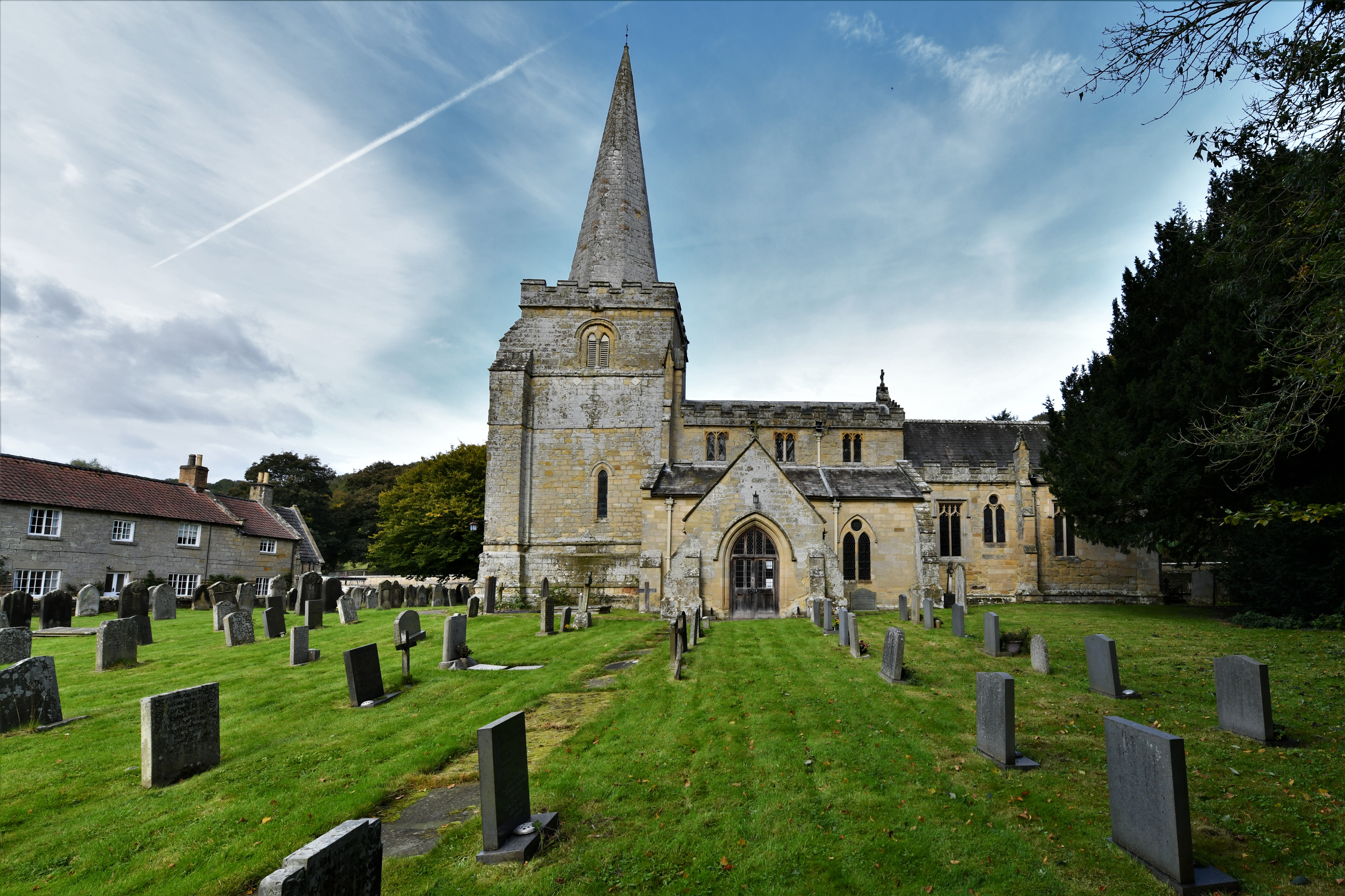
- St Peter's Church

- Location within North Yorkshire
- Population: 221 (Including Broxa-cum-Troutsdale and Darncombe-cum-Langdale Edge. 2011 census)
- OS grid reference: SE969906
- Civil parish: Hackness
- Unitary authority: North Yorkshire
- Ceremonial county: North Yorkshire
- Region: Yorkshire and the Humber
- Country: England
- Sovereign state: United Kingdom
- Post town: SCARBOROUGH
- Postcode district: YO13
- Police: North Yorkshire
- Fire: North Yorkshire
- Ambulance: Yorkshire
- UK Parliament: Scarborough and Whitby

Hackness is a village and civil parish in the district and county of North Yorkshire, England. It lies within the North York Moors National Park. The parish population rose from 125 in the 2001 UK census to 221 in the 2011 UK census.

From 1974 to 2023 it was part of the Borough of Scarborough; it is now administered by the unitary North Yorkshire Council.

== Heritage ==
The name Hackness derives from the Old English hacanæss meaning 'hook shaped promontory or ness'.

Hackness is mentioned as the site of a double monastery or nunnery by Bede, writing in the early 8th century. The present St Peter's Church is a Grade I listed building, parts of which date from the 11th century.

The church also possesses fragments of Hackness Cross dating from the late 8th or early 9th century. These preserve parts of a Latin prayer for Saint Æthelburh and an illegible inscription, apparently in the runic alphabet.

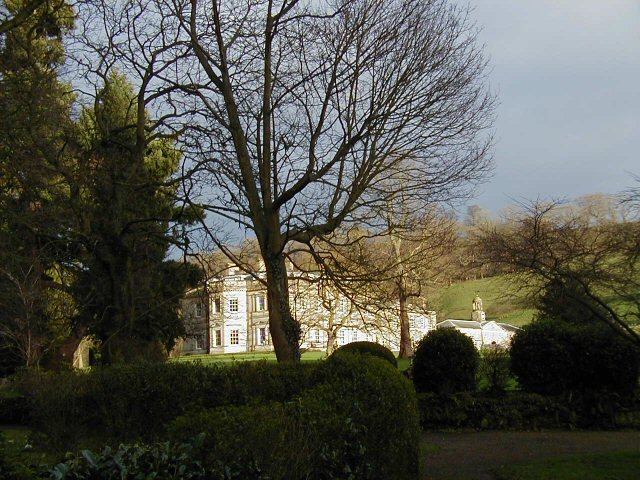
Hackness Hall, designed by Peter Atkinson c. 1795

Hackness Hall and its landscape gardens were created in the 1790s. The house, a Grade I listed building, was commissioned by Sir Richard Van den Bempde-Johnstone, who had inherited the estate through his mother. A new entrance was added in 1810. Fire damage in 1910 was restored under the direction of Walter Brierley.

== Governance ==
Hackness & Harwood Dale Group Parish Council covers a total of the six parishes: Broxa-cum-Troutsdale, Darncombe-cum-Langdale End, Hackness, Harwood Dale, Silpho and Suffield-cum-Everley. From 1974 to 2023 it was in Scarborough district.

== Sports ==
There is a tennis club in the village with three grass courts and two hard courts, on the road to Lowdales and Highdales. The club was able to celebrate 90 years of tennis in Hackness in 2013.

== Notable people ==
In birth order:

- Hilda of Whitby (c. 614–680), saint, died in Hackness.
- Begu (nun) (died 690), saint, lived in the Nunnery in Hackness.
- Lady Margaret Hoby (1571–1633) was lady of the manor, kept the earliest known female diary in English (1599–1605).
- Sir Thomas Posthumous Hoby (1566–1640) was lord of the manor, as his wife's heir, and a possible inspiration for Shakespeare's Malvolio in Twelfth Night.
- Matthew Noble (1818–1876), sculptor, made the bust of William Smith (geologist), who was employed at Hackness Hall.
- Arthur Irvin (1848–1945), cricketer and clergyman

== See also ==
- Listed buildings in Hackness
