= Moorcock Inn, Langdale End =

Listed former pub in North Yorkshire, England

Moorcock Inn
- The pub in 2019, prior to its closure in 2020
- Interactive map of the Moorcock Inn area

General information
- Type: Public house (former; originally a farmhouse)
- Location: Darncombe-cum-Langdale End, North Yorkshire, England
- Coordinates: 54.3084°N 0.5586°W
- Year built: Late 18th century
- Renovated: 19th and 20 century (altered and extended); 1992 (restored)
- Closed: 2020

Design and construction
- Designations

Listed Building – Grade II
- Official name: The Moorcock Inn and attached outbuildings
- Designated: 14 April 1987
- Reference no.: 1148852

The Moorcock Inn is a historic former public house in Darncombe-cum-Langdale End, a village in North Yorkshire, England.

The building was constructed as a farmhouse, although it also operated as a pub from an early date. Some sources claim it was built in 1640, but Historic England dates it to the late 18th century. It was named for a racehorse which won the Richmond Gold Cup three years in a row. The pub was extended in the 19th century, and again in the 20th century. From 1893 until 1989, it was operated by the Martindale family. It was restored in 1992, with the serving areas being extended. In 2014, its main room did not have a bar, with drinks instead being served at a hatch. It had a bar billiards table, and also possessed a tea room. The pub closed in 2020. The building has been Grade II listed since 1987.

The building is constructed of sandstone with stepped eaves and a pantile roof. The main block has two low storeys, two bays, with flanking single-storey extensions. On the front are two doorways, and the windows are sashes, mainly horizontal-sliding, those in the ground floor with tooled stone lintels, and in the upper floor the lintels are timber. Inside, there is a 19th-century range by Candler of Scarborough, and an early ladder stair to the loft.

== See also ==
- Listed buildings in Darncombe-cum-Langdale End
