= Harwood Dale =

Village and civil parish in North Yorkshire, England

Coordinates: 54°20′55″N 0°31′18″W

- Location within North Yorkshire
- Population: 140 (NYCC 2015)
- OS grid reference: SE962958
- Civil parish: Harwood Dale
- Unitary authority: North Yorkshire
- Ceremonial county: North Yorkshire
- Region: Yorkshire and the Humber
- Country: England
- Sovereign state: United Kingdom
- Post town: SCARBOROUGH
- Postcode district: YO13
- Police: North Yorkshire
- Fire: North Yorkshire
- Ambulance: Yorkshire
- UK Parliament: Scarborough and Whitby

Harwood Dale is a village and civil parish in the county of North Yorkshire, England. It lies within the North York Moors National Park. According to the 2001 UK census, Harwood Dale parish had a population of 134, which had risen to 140 at the 2011 Census, and remained at that number for an estimate by North Yorkshire County Council in 2015.

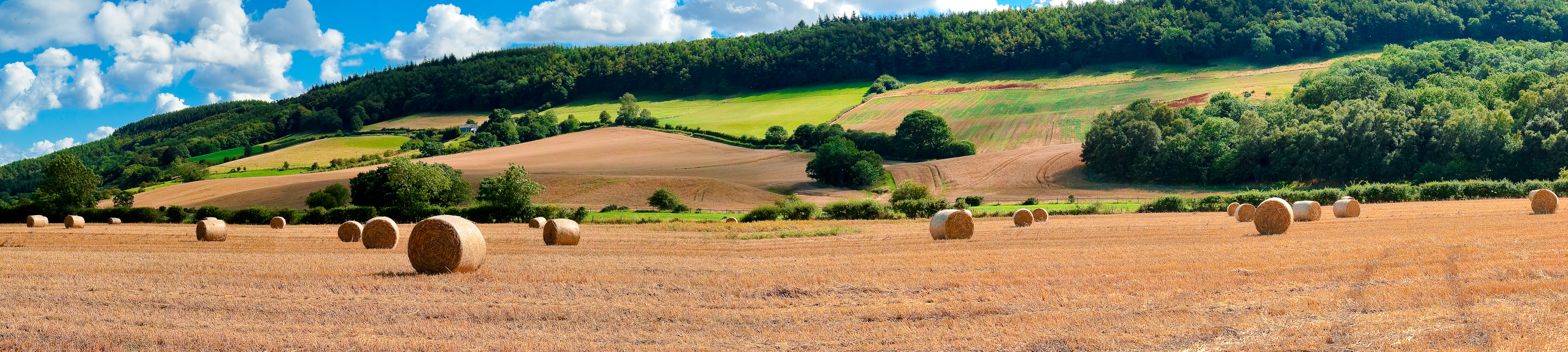
Harwood Dale Scarborough North Yorkshire England

The name Harwood derives from the Old English wudu meaning 'wood' and an uncertain first element, either hær meaning 'heap of stones', hār meaning 'grey', or hara meaning 'hare'.

== Governance ==
The parish council is Hackness and Harwood Dale Group Parish Council, which covers the six parishes of Broxa-cum-Troutsdale, Darncombe-cum-Langdale End, Hackness, Harwood Dale, Silpho and Suffield-cum-Everley.

From 1974 to 2023 it was part of the Borough of Scarborough, it is now administered by the unitary North Yorkshire Council.

== Diarist ==
The ruined Old St Margaret's Church, Harwood Dale, was built in memory of Margaret, Lady Hoby (1571–1633) of Hackness. She kept what is thought to be the oldest extant diary by a woman in English.

== See also ==
- Listed buildings in Harwood Dale
