= Suffield-cum-Everley =

Civil parish in North Yorkshire, England

Coordinates: 54.2835°N 0.4850°W

- Civil parish
- Population: 241 (2011 census)
- OS grid reference: SE987886
- Civil parish: Suffield-cum-Everley
- Unitary authority: North Yorkshire
- Ceremonial county: North Yorkshire
- Region: Yorkshire and the Humber
- Country: England
- Sovereign state: United Kingdom
- Post town: SCARBOROUGH
- Postcode district: YO12
- Police: North Yorkshire
- Fire: North Yorkshire
- Ambulance: Yorkshire
- UK Parliament: Scarborough and Whitby

Suffield-cum-Everley is a civil parish in North Yorkshire, England.

According to the 2011 UK census, the parish (including Silpho) had a population of 241, an increase on the 2001 UK census figure of 61.

The parish council is Hackness & Harwood Dale Group Parish Council which covers the six parishes of Broxa-cum-Troutsdale, Darncombe-cum-Langdale End, Hackness, Harwood Dale, Silpho and Suffield-cum-Everley.

From 1974 to 2023 it was part of the Borough of Scarborough, it is now administered by the unitary North Yorkshire Council.

== See also ==
- Listed buildings in Suffield-cum-Everley
