= Thorpe Underwood Hall =

Building in North Yorkshire, England

Coordinates: 54°01′38″N 1°17′40″W

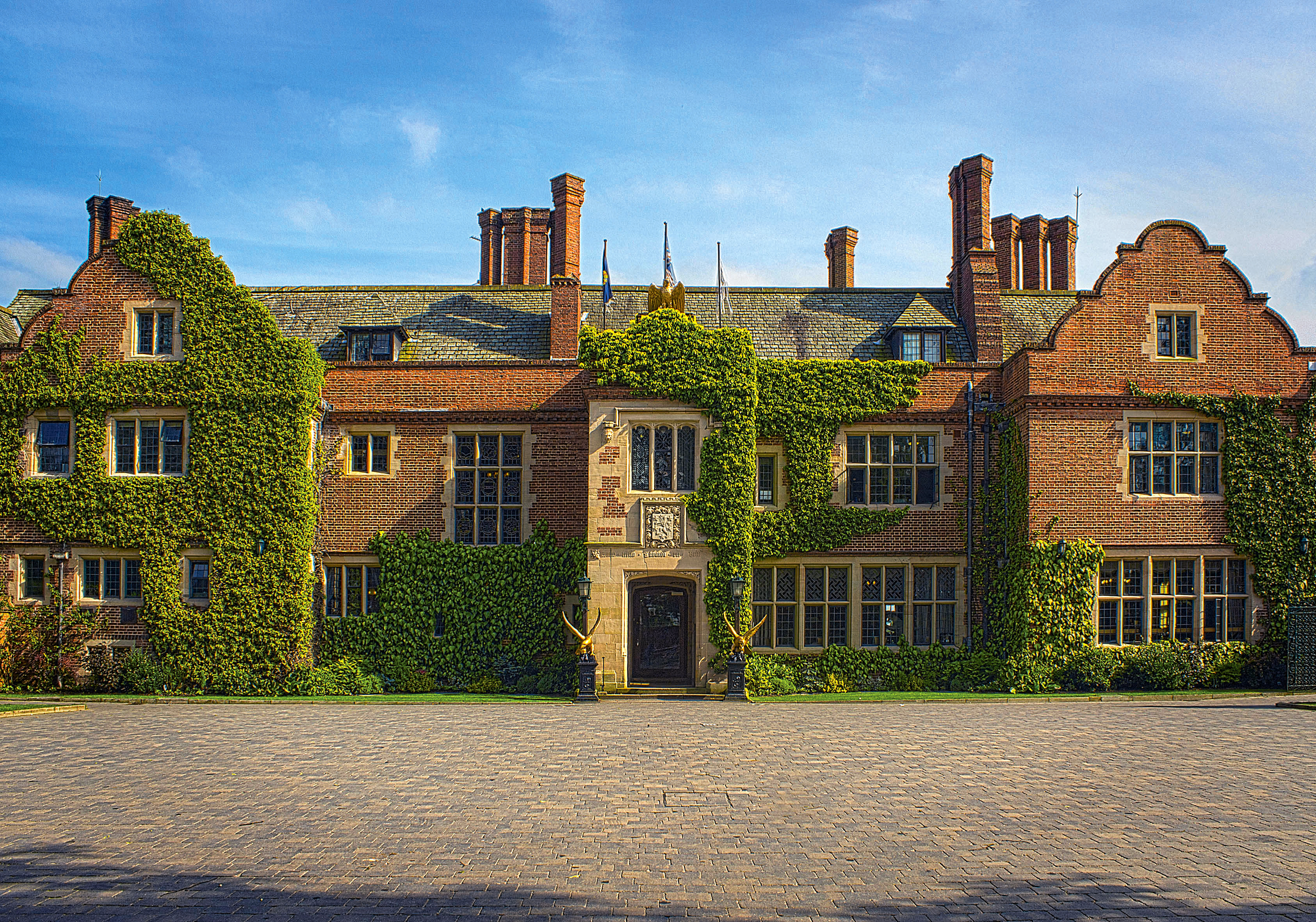
The building, in 2014

Thorpe Underwood Hall is a historic building in Thorpe Underwood, North Yorkshire, a hamlet in England.

In the 19th century, Thorpe Green Hall was the manor house of Thorpe Underwood. It is best known for Anne and Branwell Bronte's time spent there, tutoring the owners' children. The house burned down in 1895, and between 1902 and 1903 a replacement was constructed for Frederick William Slingsby. The new building was known as "Thorpe Underwood Hall". It was designed by Walter Brierley, in what Nikolaus Pevsner describes as an "opulent Neo-Jacobean" style. In 1991, it was purchased by Queen Ethelburga's Collegiate school, and has since formed the centre of its campus. The building was grade II* listed in 1980.

The building is constructed of red brick on a chamfered brick plinth, with sandstone dressings and a slate roof. The entrance front has two storeys and five bays, with a two-storey service bay at the left. The end and centre bays project, the end bays with shaped gables, and the centre bay with a parapet. In the centre is a square-headed doorcase containing a doorway with a double-chamfered surround and a Tudor arch. The spandrels are decorated, and the lintel is inscribed. Flanking the doorway are heraldic beasts, and above it is a decorated shield. Most of the windows are mullioned or mullioned and transomed, and there are half-hipped dormers. On the garden front are three bay windows, the middle one canted and the outer ones square.

Features inside the building include a massive stone fireplace in the hall; a library with built-in shelving and an inglenook fireplace; an 18th-century chimneypiece in the drawing room, moved from elsewhere; an elaborate fireplace in the dining room; and the original staircase. There is panelling throughout the ground floor and most rooms have moulded plasterwork ceilings.

== See also ==
- Grade II* listed buildings in North Yorkshire (district)
- Listed buildings in Thorpe Underwoods
