= Yorkshire Youth Choir =

Yorkshire Youth Choir (YYC) was formed in 2002 as part of Northern Orchestral Enterprises Limited (NOEL). It comprises both a Main and Training Choir with a current total of around 130 members ages ranging from 10 to 21.

== About The Choir ==
YYC was formed in 2002 as part of Northern Orchestral Enterprises Limited (NOEL) under the Artistic Directorship of John Pryce-Jones. The Choir routinely meets twice a year in the Easter and Summer holidays for week-long residential courses and currently has around 130 members, ages ranging from 10–21. The choir has visited a number of schools and Universities around Yorkshire to hold the residential courses. These include Ampleforth College, University of York, Giggleswick School, Harrogate Ladies' College and Queen Ethelburga's Collegiate. From 2002 to 2007 the Main Choir did not have a permanent conductor and invited guest conductors to work with the choir for the residential courses. These included Joyce Ellis, Jill Henderson-Wild, Cathy Roberts, Gilian Dibden and Mark Griffiths. Since 2008, NOEL's Artistic Director John Pryce-Jones has been the permanent conductor of the Main Choir with his wife and fellow artistic director Alison Pryce-Jones having conducted the Training Choir since the choir's inception.

The Training Choir sings in SA and SSA format and is intended for primarily younger and less chorally experienced choir members to develop their sight reading, aural and general choral skills. However, following a few Training Choir courses, members are usually deemed ready to be moved up into the Main Choir. The Main Choir sings in SATB format and usually joins together with the training choir to sing a Medley of Popular/Musical Theatre songs at the end of concerts.

The Yorkshire Youth Choir has always been dedicated to introducing its choristers to varied styles and cultures of music. One of the ways this is done is through workshops taking place both during and in between residential courses. These workshops have explored areas of music that would not usually be covered in a choir, such as Jazz, Gospel, African, World and Theatre music. In these workshops, YYC have worked with the likes of Pete Churchill, Chris Mallinson, Lin Marsh, Lucky Moyo, Paul Whittaker and Cyrilla Rowsell. These workshops have been taking place since the Easter residential of 2003 and have been largely successful, especially in the case of Pete Churchill who has returned to give workshops at 3 separate residential courses.

The choir has contributed to the production of several professional musicians and performers, many of whom have undergone some form of professional education in institutes such as LIPA and East15.

== 2008 tour of Italy ==
At the end of July 2008, YYC embarked on their first overseas tour, to the Tuscany region of Italy. Staying in a hotel in Montecatini Terme, the choir performed in three concerts in Florence, Montecatini Terme and Perugia across the five-day tour. The final concert, at the Duomo in Perugia, was the end of YYC careers for many of the older members. The concert ended with an encore song, "Change in my Life", featuring Sam Parry on lead solo. The tour was a success; however, despite the wish to repeat and do another abroad tour, YYC have come short funding wise since the recession and have so far been unable to go abroad again.

The Italy tour of 2008 was as preceded as usual by an Easter residential course, but also by competing in the BBC Choir of the Year competition. The first stage of this was to compete in an area selection stage. The judges will then choose any number of Choirs of the day for each area, then a separate panel will select the choirs that go through to the Finals, based on the recordings of the Choirs of the Day. YYC were selected as one of the choirs of the day at their Area Selection but did not make it through to the Finals. The eventual winners of the 2008 Choir of the Year competition were Taplow Youth Choir.

== Cultural Olympiad 2012 ==
YYC have been taking part in the "Don't Just Sit There" project as part of the Cultural Olympiad 2012. The idea of the "Don't Just Sit There" project is to inspire people to increase participation in sport and other physical activities using alternative movement forms including music. YYC took part in a workshop in November followed by a recording of a specially commissioned piece by Stuart Wood called "When I Move, The World Moves Too" in January. This is to be performed LIVE on 13 May at Quarry Hill, Leeds as further promotion of the Cultural Olympiad 2012.

== 10th Year Anniversary Celebrations ==
2012 marks the 10th anniversary of YYC. During the Easter holidays, YYC will have a residential course as usual, and at the end of course concert, all the previous YYC Members will be invited back to join in a piece at the end of the concert. The venue for this concert is unconfirmed at the moment, but venue's such as Huddersfield Town Hall are thought to be top of the list.

== 2012 Tour of Mallorca ==
The second half of YYC's anniversary year will see an overseas tour to Mallorca. This will be the second overseas tour in YYC's 10-year history.

== Recordings ==
=== Residential Course Albums ===
- Easter 2002, LIVE at Ampleforth College
- Summer 2002, LIVE at York Minster
- Summer 2004, LIVE at Sir Jack Lyon's Concert Hall, University of York
- Summer 2005, LIVE at Sir Jack Lyon's Concert Hall, University of York
- Easter 2006, LIVE at Giggleswick School
- Easter 2007, LIVE at Giggleswick School
- Summer 2007, LIVE at Harrogate Ladies College
- Summer 2008, LIVE at Duomo, Perugia, Italy
- Easter 2009, LIVE at Selby Abbey
- Summer 2009, LIVE at Halifax Minster
- Easter 2010, LIVE at Beverley Minster
- Summer 2010, LIVE at Halifax Minster

=== Stand Alone Recordings ===
- 'When I Move, The World Moves Too' Recording for the Cultural Olympiad 2012

== Video/DVDs ==
- Summer 2006, LIVE at Harrogate Ladies College
- 'When I Move, The World Moves Too', Recording for Cultural Olympiad 2012
