= Queen Ethelburga's Collegiate =

Boarding and day schools in York, England

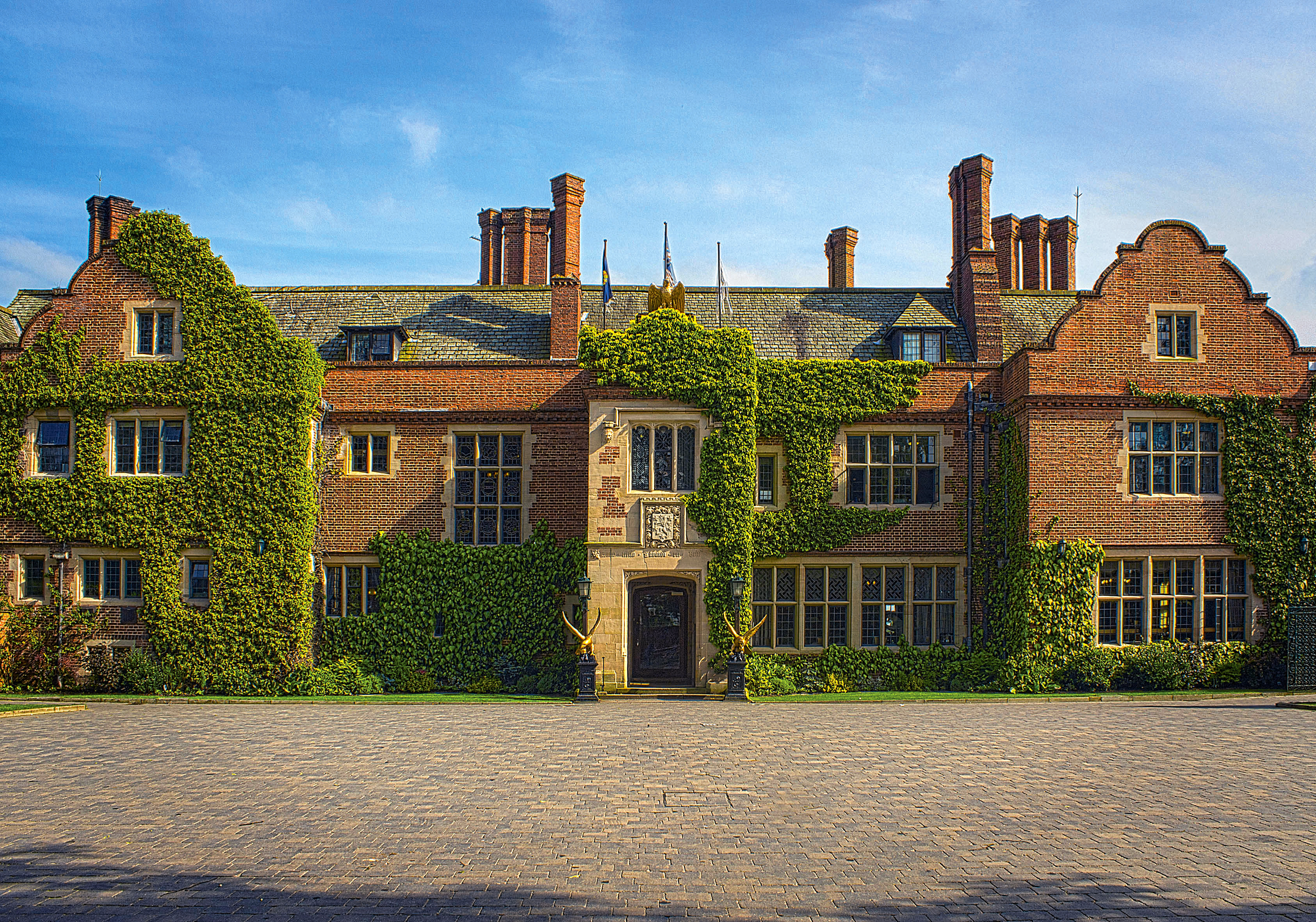

Location
- Thorpe Underwood; York, North Yorkshire, YO26 9SS; England; 54.0280°N 1.2933°W

Information
- Type: Independent Boarding & Day School
- Motto: To be the best that I can with the gifts that I have
- Established: 1912; 114 years ago
- Founder: Nathaniel Woodard
- Trust: The Collegiate Foundation
- Chair School Board: Amy Martin
- Principal: Daniel Machin
- Age: 3 months to 19 years
- Capacity: 1,600
- Houses: Cantwara; Derwent; Eoforwic; Lyminge
- Colours: Blue & gold
- Website: www.qe.org

Queen Ethelburga's Collegiate incorporates four boarding and day schools for girls and boys from 3 months to 19 years old, located in Thorpe Underwood, near Little Ouseburn, close to York and Harrogate, England. It is a member of the Independent Schools Association. It is named after Æthelburh of Kent.

Queen Ethelburga's College has three sections: the Chapter House preparatory school, King's Magna middle school, and a Key Stage 4 (GCSE) and Sixth Form (A-Level) section. The second is the Faculty of Queen Ethelburga's and is purely Key Stage 4 (GCSE) and Sixth Form (A-Level and BTEC).

== History ==
=== 20th century ===
The school originally belonged to the Woodard Corporation, founded by Nathaniel Woodard. The sister senior school was Queen Margaret's School at Escrick and the Junior School was Queen Mary's at Baldersby Park near Thirsk.

The School foundation stone was laid on 21 October 1910 by Viscountess Mountgarret, its inscription was 'Pro deo et ecclesia' – For God and the Church. It was laid on the right-hand side of the school door facing the building.

The school was opened on 27 September 1912 by the Duchess of Albany, with Derwent and Lyminge opened by Lord Halifax on 18 June 1932. The chapel was given by Lord Mountgarret and dedicated to St Aiden. Its foundation stone was laid on 8 May 1911 by the Archbishop of York and its inscription is Jesus himself being the chief cornerstone.

=== Modernity ===
In 1991, Queen Ethelburga's School left the Woodard Corporation, became independent, and came to exist in the trust arrangement, renamed Queen Ethelburga's College. At this time, at the behest of the new owner Brian Martin, it moved from Harrogate to the present campus at Thorpe Underwood Hall.

The senior school has been co-educational since 1999 and draws pupils from over 30 countries.

Pupil numbers of Queen Ethelburga's Collegiate rose from a total of 550 in 2007 to 1,590 in 2015. In the same period an £80 million investment was made in a new sports village, new boarding houses and new classrooms, and other facilities, such as a pastoral care centre for caring for students' mental health and behaviour care.

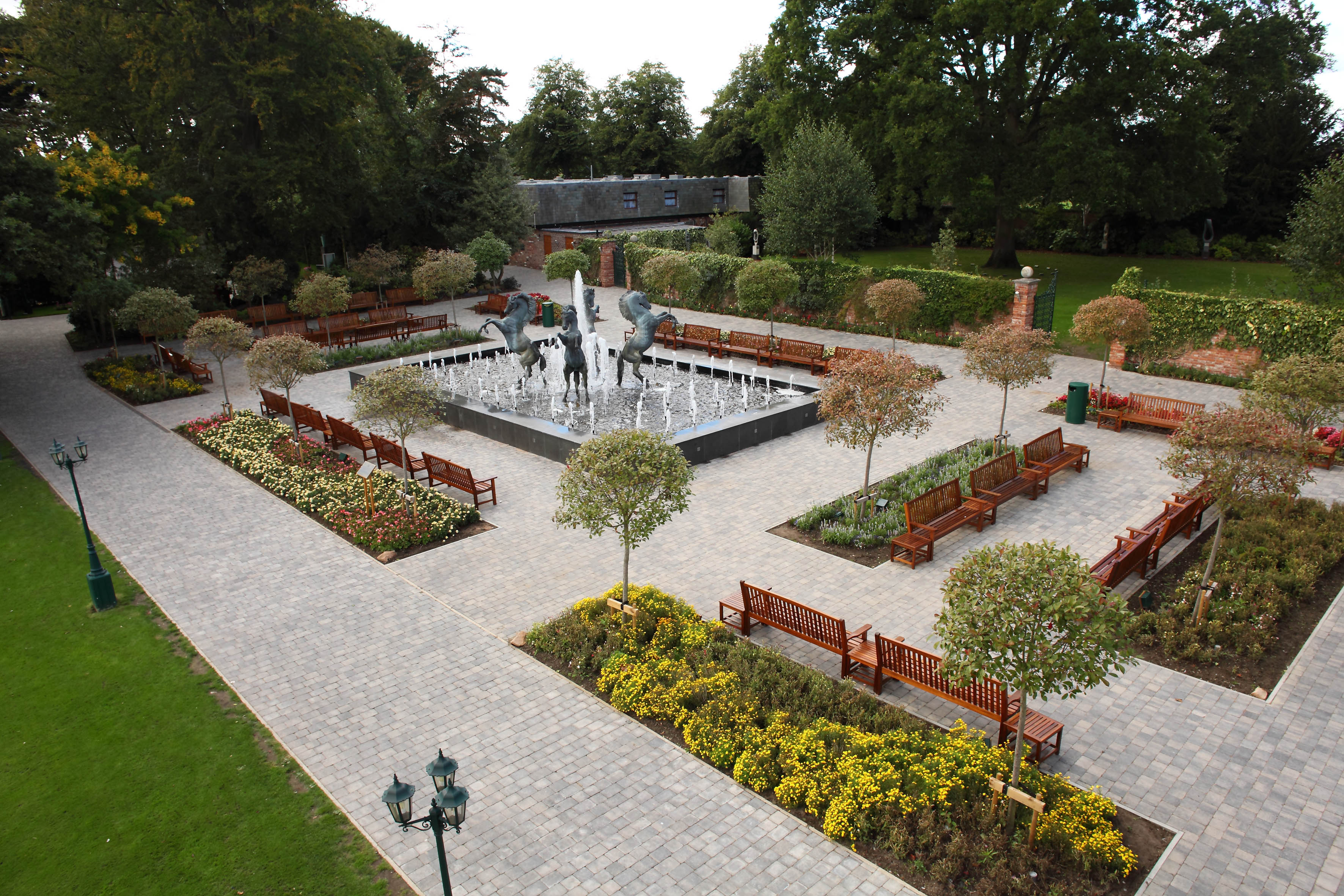

== Rankings ==
Queen Ethelburga's College was ranked tenth by The Daily Telegraph, for A*/A A-Level Results, in their 2015 UK Independent School League Tables. The Faculty of Queen Ethelburga's was ranked 11th in the same League Table. In 2017, Queen Ethelburga's College was ranked as the top performing independendent school in Yorkshire. In 2018, it was the only independent school in Yorkshire to rank in the top 50 nationally. In 2019, Queen Ethelburga's College was ranked second in the country with 85.7 per cent of students getting three A-levels at grades AAB or higher.

The 2016 pass rate at Queen Ethelburga's College was 100%, with 98% of its A-Level grades A* to B. The Faculty of Queen Ethelburga's on the other hand had achieved 91% Distinction or Distinction Star grades in all BTEC subjects, the two highest possible grade classifications. In 2019, 80.05% of pupils scored A*-A for their A-Levels examination, whereas 80% scored A*-A for their GCSEs. Results have remained consistently strong over the last few years and in 2021, students in the academically focused college achieved 85% percent A*/A at A-Level (96 per cent A*/B),. The Faculty, which offers a wider range of academic, creative, and vocational courses, achieved 77% percent A*/A (92 percent A*/B). The percentage of D*/D grades in The Faculty was 75%.

Results at Key Stage 4 are also strong with 85% of college grades at 7 or above and 68% of Faculty grades at 6 or above in 2021. Faculty students are also able to take BTECs with more than 50% of grades at Distinction or Distinction* standard.

== Sports ==
Queen Ethelburga's has 42 acres of outdoor sports pitches and a full-time team of grounds keepers. As well as providing a facility for students and visiting schools, it has also hosted Newcastle United and a number of other sports teams for summer training. The Faculty of Queen Ethelburga's offers the Performance Sports Programme (PSP), a specialist program which allows students to focus on their chosen sport alongside strength and conditioning, nutrition and performance analysis.

=== Athletics ===
Students from the school have been successful in the Independent School Association National Cross Country finals and in the 2016 Under-20 International meet. In 2021, a student became the U20 Northern long jump champion.

=== Rugby ===
Queen Ethelburga's rugby union first team secured the 2015 British Colleges National Cup.

Some former students have been selected for the England Counties U18 Squad.

In July 2019, The Faculty of Queen Ethelburga's student Suva Ma'asi was signed by The Cornish Pirates Rugby Team.

In April 2019, The Faculty of Queen Ethelburga's student Joseph Sawdon was selected to represent the 2019 ISRFC Lambs South Africa Touring Squad.

In 2021, The Faculty of Queen Ethelburga's student Jason Qareqare made his professional debut for Castleford Tigers Rugby League Team.

=== Netball ===
Students from the school have been selected for the Netball Europe Championship. They have also been selected as part of the Leeds Rhinos U17 and U19 squads. In 2018, the U18 Netball squad won the Independent Schools Association National Netball Cup.

=== Cricket ===
In 2016, Yorkshire County Cricket Club agreed to a partnership with the school which includes the creation of a joint cricket academy for 16 to 19-year-old players.

In 2018, The Faculty of Queen Ethelburga's student Dominic Leech was selected to represent England U19 Squad, and in August 2020 made his first-class debut with Yorkshire Country Cricket Club.

In June 2021, The Faculty of Queen Ethelburga's student Harry Crawshaw made his debut for Durham in the 2021 T20 Blast. Crawshaw was selected to represent England and Wales Cricket Board U19 Young Lions on their tour to Sri Lanka in November 2021.

=== Basketball ===
In December 2019, two students at the school were selected to represent England U16 men and U18 men in the Tri-Nations Tournament.

=== Football ===
In March 2020, The Senior Football squad made it to the final of the Independent Schools Football Association Cup (ISFA) which was held at Milton Keynes Dons Football Club. The game finished 5–4 to Millfield in what ISFA described as 'arguably the most thrilling Boodles ISFA Cup Final of all time'.

Some students have been selected to join external football teams.

=== Other ===
In December 2021, King's Magna students Lily-May Horn won the Independent School Association (ISA) National Clay Pigeon Shooting competition in the Senior women's category scoring 46/50.

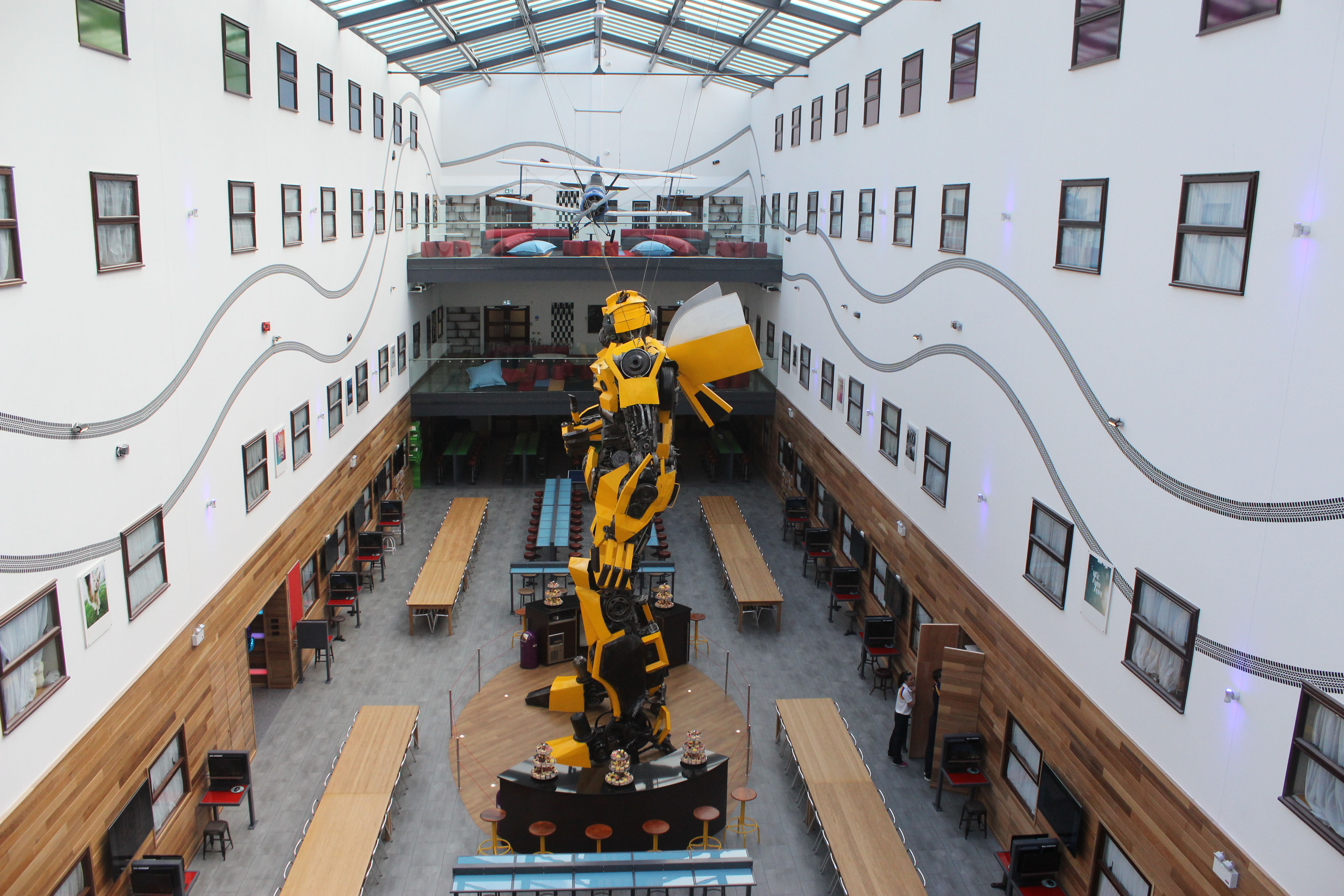

== Awards ==
The catering team was awarded Independent School Caterer of the Year in 2017 at the 'Educatering' Excellence Awards, along with the School Food Plan Award. A group of students was awarded McDougall's Young Baking Team of the Year in 2017.

In October 2021, Chapter House, the Early Years, Infants and Junior School at Queen Ethelburga's Collegiate was re-awarded the Primary Quality Mark Award for English and Mathematics by the national program The Quality Mark. This new Award followed after Chapter House was awarded the Primary Science Quality Mark (PQSM) Gilt, earned in June 2021.

== Inspections ==
In mid-2015, the school was given the notice to improve after an inspection by the Independent Schools Inspectorate, conducted at the request of the Department of Education, described a large CCTV network on the school site. As of late 2015, the school was given a clean bill of health and in 2019, both the college and the faculty were graded as excellent in all categories by the Independent Schools Inspectorate.

The most recent ISI Inspection took place in 2019 and was a Regulatory Compliance and Educational Quality Inspection. The report found both schools to be fully compliant and rated the achievements of the pupils, including their academic development, and their personal development, as ‘Excellent’. The Early Years Foundation Stage, as part of Queen Ethelburga's College, received an ‘Outstanding’ rating for the effectiveness of its early year's provision.

The full inspection report noted that “pupils display great self-confidence, self-awareness, and resilience; they reflect on their learning and demonstrate an excellent understanding of how to improve further.” Additionally, inspectors commented on the way in which students were confident to take risks and enjoy taking on new challenges. Queen Ethelburga's is an international school with students from over 50 different nationalities, and inspectors appreciated the atmosphere of tolerance and understanding across the Collegiate.

== Controversies ==
=== Pedophile convictions ===
In 2018 Brian Martin, Chair of Governors until 2015, faced three charges regarding offences against pupils at the college: two of indecently assaulting a girl in the early 1990s and one of sexually assaulting a boy in the late 2000s. At a subsequent trial, Martin was found guilty of an indecent assault on a girl and a sexual assault on a boy and received a sentence of three years and three months.

In 2018 staff member Thomas Ball, who held a junior role at Queen Ethelburga's, was arrested on a series of charges including three counts of making indecent images of children as well as downloading child pornography. In March 2021 Ball was jailed for 20 months.

On 16 October 2020, Mariusz Borowski, a chef working at the school, was arrested on and charged with three counts of making indecent images of children, to counts of distributing indecent images and one count of possessing extreme pornography. Among the evidence were two laptops containing over 3,120 photos and videos of child pornography. On 22 November 2022, Borowski was sentenced to 14 months in jail.

=== Money laundering ===
In May 2016 The Guardian reported that, in March 2012, $20,792 (£14,350) was sent via Lloyds Bank in Harrogate to Queen Ethelburga's Collegiate. This was said to be money laundered from the Russian Hermitage Capital Management fraud.

In September 2017 The Guardian reported that £89,800 was transferred to Queen Ethelburga's Collegiate in 2014. The money was reportedly connected to the Azerbaijani Laundromat scandal, in which the Azerbaijani government is supposedly involved.

=== Charity Commission investigation into linked charities ===
In January 2018, the Charity Commission had begun an investigation into two charities linked to QE. The charities were The Collegiate Charitable Foundation and The Martin Foundation. The primary activity of these charities is to "...provide bursaries to enable students to attend independent primary and secondary schools; provide advertising, facilities, and equipment, and assist the local community.” The Commission took over the management of the charities and is yet to make a judgment on the situation.
