= Kirby Hall, Harrogate =

Civil parish and estate in North Yorkshire, England

Coordinates: 54°02′33″N 1°18′08″W

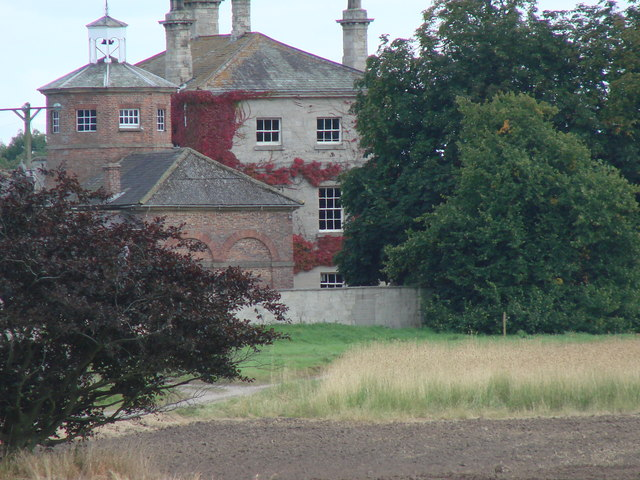
The surviving section of the hall

Kirby Hall is a civil parish and estate located between Great Ouseburn and Little Ouseburn in North Yorkshire, in England.

== Civil parish ==
In the 19th century, Kirby Hall was a township in the parish of Little Ouseburn; in 1851, it had a population of 48 people. It has a grouped parish council with Little Ouseburn and Thorpe Underwood. There is no village in the parish, which is centred on the former Kirby Hall estate. This was recorded in the Domesday Book, and ended up in the ownership of the Thompson family in the 1680s.

Until 1974 it was part of the West Riding of Yorkshire. From 1974 to 2023 it was part of the Borough of Harrogate, it is now administered by the unitary North Yorkshire Council.

== The estate ==
=== The hall ===
A new country house was commissioned by Stephen Thompson in 1746, and was built by Richard Boyle, 3rd Earl of Burlington and Roger Morris, with John Carr as the Clerk of Works. The work cost £13,500, and contained carvings by Grinling Gibbons and murals by James Thornhill. The house was influential, and was illustrated in Vitruvius Britannica. It lay within parkland, which included a serpentine river.

An eight-room wing was added in 1800, but was demolished in 1857 and a 24-room replacement wing was added in 1860. In 1919, the family sold the estate, and in 1920 most of the house was demolished.

The remains of the house are built of limestone, and include a seven-bay house wall, and an angle and quadrant wall at the left. This contains a segmental-arched opening with a rusticated surround, a moulded cornice, and ball finials. The forecourt wall has a plinth, pilaster piers and ball finials, and is partly balustraded. The carriage gate piers are square, and rusticated, with moulded bases, moulded cornices, stepped-up caps and pineapple finials. They are grade II listed.

The former service wing of the house is the only intact section, and is separately grade II listed. It is in limestone on a plinth, partly rendered, with floor bands, a moulded eaves cornice, and a slate roof. There are two storeys and an attic, and two bays, and a single-storey four-bay wing recessed on the right. The windows are sashes. In the left return is the doorcase re-set from the original house. It is in sandstone, with a moulded surround, and a cornice hood on scrolled consoles.

=== New Lodge ===
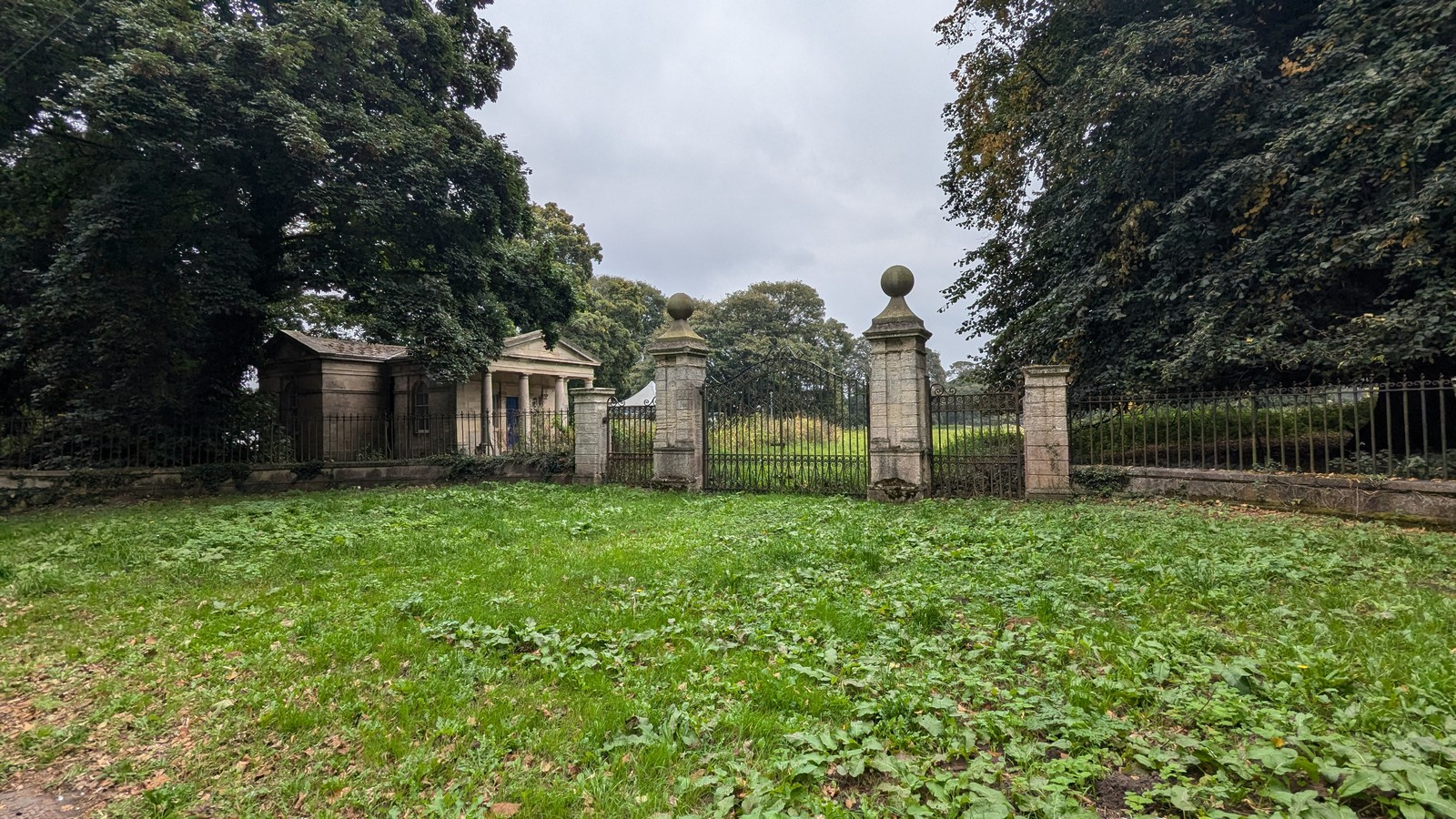
Gateway at the New Lodge

The New Lodge is grade II listed. It is built of limestone, with a continuous impost band, an entablature a dentilled eaves cornice, and a slate roof. There is one storey, a cruciform plan, and a front of three bays. On the front is a tetrastyle Tuscan portico with a pediment. The windows are round-headed sashes, on the front with keystones, and on the returns under pedimented gables. The rear walls have flat coping and contain a square-headed doorway.

The gates, piers, walls and railings at New Lodge are separately grade II* listed. Its carriage gateway dates from about 1750, with the pedestrian gateway and walls dating from the 19th century, and they are in limestone. The carriage gates are in wrought iron and delicately decorated. The gate piers are square and about 4 metres (13 ft) high, with banded rustication. Each pier has a frieze with triglyphs and rosettes, above which is a moulded cornice and ball finials on voluted pedestals. The pedestrian gates are in cast iron, and the piers are about 3 metres (9.8 ft) high and less ornate. The quadrant walls have a moulded plinth and coping, and the railings have urn finials. The end piers have moulded cornices and pyramidal caps.

=== Old Lodge ===
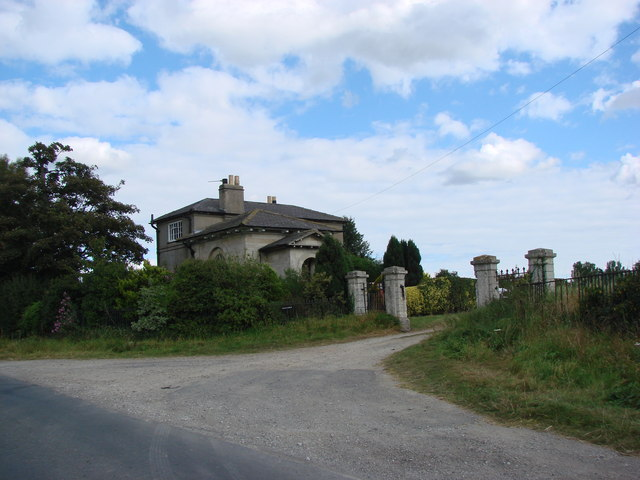
The Old Lodge

The Old Lodge, designed by Robert Lugar in about 1814, is in limestone and has overhanging eaves and a pyramidal slate roof. There is a single storey and one bay. Projecting from the front is a porch with a pediment, containing a round-arched doorway with voussoirs and a hood mould. In each return is a round-headed casement window in a round-arched recess with an archivolt of voussoirs.

=== Stables ===
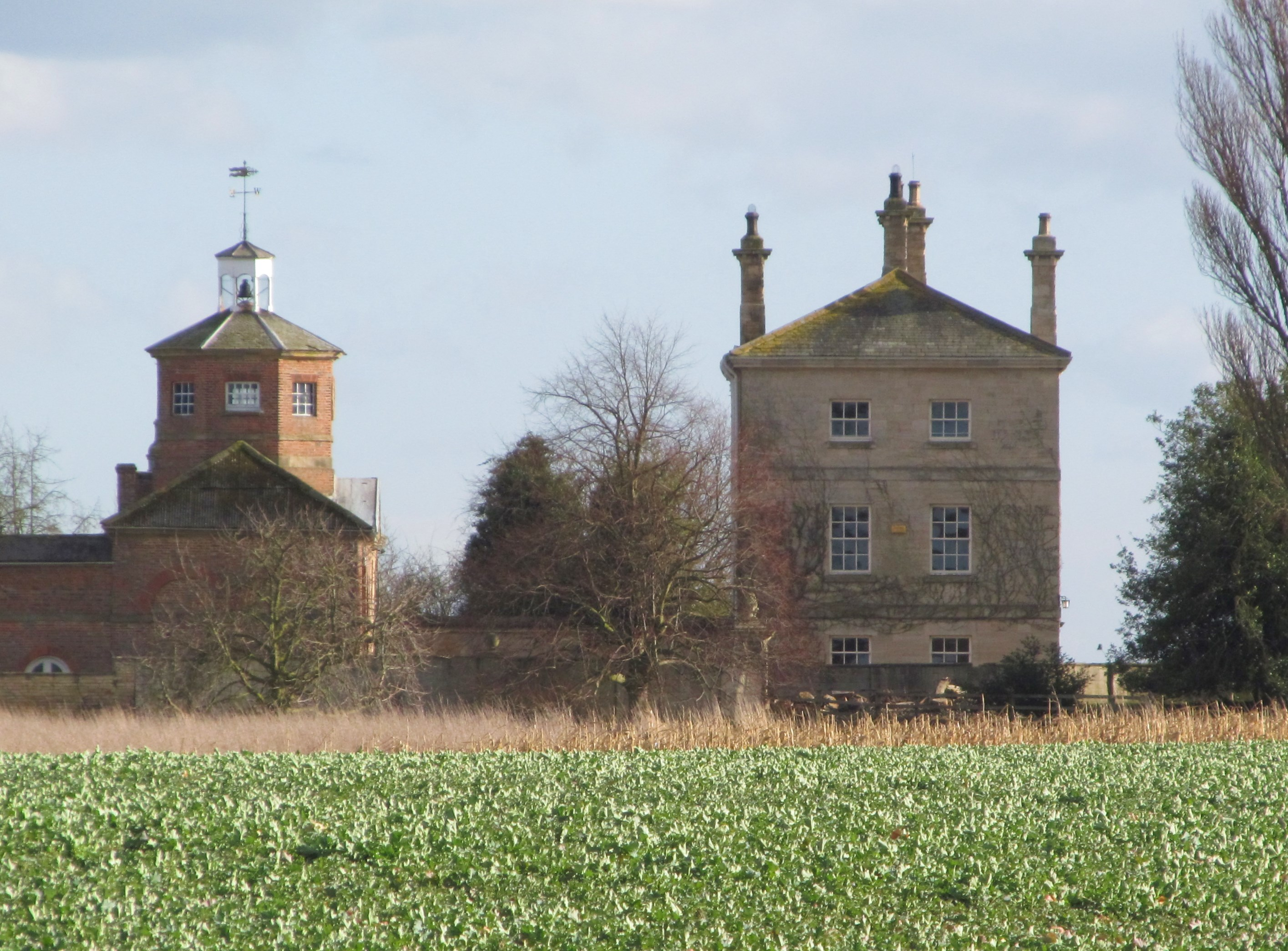
The stables

The stable buildings form four ranges round a courtyard. They are in orange-pink brick, with sandstone dressings, an impost band, an eaves cornice, and hipped slate roofs. The main range has two storeys, a central bay with an open pediment, and flanking two-bay wings. In the centre is a carriage arch, and on the roof is a stone-banded octagonal cupola with a clock face, a timber lantern, and a wrought iron weathervane. The flanking bays contain sash windows in recessed blind arches, and above are lunettes.

== See also ==
- Grade II* listed buildings in North Yorkshire (district)
- Listed buildings in Kirby Hall, Harrogate
