= Listed buildings in Little Ouseburn =

Little Ouseburn is a civil parish in the county of North Yorkshire, England. It contains 13 listed buildings that are recorded in the National Heritage List for England. Of these, one is listed at Grade I, the highest of the three grades, one is at Grade II*, the middle grade, and the others are at Grade II, the lowest grade. The parish contains the village of Little Ouseburn and the surrounding countryside. Most of the listed buildings are houses, farmhouses and associated structures, and the other consist of a church, a mausoleum in the churchyard, a boundary stone and a milestone.

== Key ==
| Grade | Criteria |
|---|---|
| I | Buildings of exceptional interest, sometimes considered to be internationally important |
| II* | Particularly important buildings of more than special interest |
| II | Buildings of national importance and special interest |

== Buildings ==
| Name and location | Photograph | Date | Notes | Grade |
|---|---|---|---|---|
| Holy Trinity Church; 54.04424°N 1.31065°W | | 11th century | The church has been altered and extended through the centuries, including a restoration in 1875 by Austin and Paley. It is built in stone with a stone flag roof, and consists of nave, a south aisle, a south porch, a chancel with a north organ chamber and vestry, and a west tower. The tower dates from the 11th century, it is unbuttressed, and has three stages, a string course, paired bell openings, and an embattled parapet with corner pinnacles, a small saddleback roof and a weathercock. On the south side of the chancel is a round-arched priest's door. | I |
| Moat Hall; 54.04296°N 1.31129°W | | Early to mid 18th century | The house incorporates part of an earlier house with a timber framed core. The exterior is rendered and colourwashed with a modillion eaves cornice. The roof of the front range is in pantile with a stone slate verge, and the rear of the roof is in slate. There are two storeys, a triple-depth plan, and a front range of five bays. The central doorway has fluted pilaster jambs, a blocked radial fanlight, and an open pediment. On the front are cross windows, those in the upper floor with cambered heads. In the right return is a mullioned and transomed window, and on the left return is a sundial. | II |
| Beech House and outbuildings 54.04044°N 1.31797°W | — | Mid 18th century | The house is in mottled pink brick on a sandstone plinth, with floor and eaves bands, and a pantile roof. There are two storeys and three bays. The entrance is in the left return, and the windows on the front are sashes. To the right is a lower two-storey three-bay outbuilding in cobble with orange-red brick bands. It contains a doorway with a fanlight, various windows, and pigeon openings in the right gable. Further to the right is an outbuilding with one storey and a loft, with a loading door on the right return. | II |
| Broadlands Farmhouse; 54.04049°N 1.31928°W | — | Mid 18th century | The farmhouse is in plum red brick with floor and eaves bands and a pantile roof. There are two storeys and three bays. The doorway and the windows, which are sashes, have cambered brick arches. | II |
| Manor Farmhouse; 54.04062°N 1.31599°W | — | 18th century | The house is in orange-red brick, with floor and eaves bands, and a pantile roof with coped gables and shaped kneelers. There are two storeys and four bays. The entrance is at the rear, and the windows are sashes. | II |
| Sloethorne Farmhouse; 54.04088°N 1.31491°W | — | Mid 18th century | The farmhouse is in mottled pink brick, with floor and eaves bands, and a pantile roof with a stone slate verge, and tumbled-in gables on the left. There are two storeys, a double depth plan and five bays. In the centre is a porch, and the windows are casements. | II |
| Thompson Mausoleum; 54.04407°N 1.31116°W | | Mid 18th century | The mausoleum in the churchyard of Holy Trinity Church is in sandstone with a lead roof. It consists of a rotunda, with an attached Roman Doric colonnade of 13 columns, carrying a triglyph frieze and a cornice, and surmounted by a plain drum and a ribbed domed roof. The doorway has an architrave, a pulvinated frieze and a cornice, and above it is an inscribed panel. | II* |
| Village Farm; 54.04008°N 1.32026°W | — | Mid 18th century | The farmhouse is in orange-red brick, with a floor band, a dentilled eaves course and a pantile roof. There are two storeys and three bays. On the front is a doorway, and the windows are horizontally-sliding sashes, two in the ground floor with segmental arches. | II |
| Farm building east of Manor Farmhouse; 54.04064°N 1.31551°W | — | Late 18th century | The farm building is in cobbles with bands of orange-red brick and a pantile roof. There are two storeys and a loft, and four bays. The windows have cambered arches, and on the left return is an external staircase leading to a doorway with a cambered arch. | II |
| Wall west of Sloethorne Farmhouse; 54.04100°N 1.31511°W | — | Mid 18th century | The wall is in cobble and brick, with red brick banding, it is rendered in places, and has sandstone coping. Its height varies between 1.75 metres (5 ft 9 in) and 2.25 metres (7 ft 5 in), it is ramped up in places, and towards the south it contains double gates. | II |
| Boundary stone 54.03138°N 1.32061°W | — | Mid 19th century (probable) | The parish boundary stone is on the west side of the B6265 road and is in sandstone. It has a triangular plan, and is about 0.5 metres (1 ft 8 in) high. The top is sloping, and is incised with the letters "B S". | II |
| Garden wall, Broadlands Farmhouse; 54.04056°N 1.31885°W | — | 19th century | The wall runs along the east and south sides of the garden. It is in orange-red brick with cambered sandstone coping, and is about 1.5 metres (4 ft 11 in) high. | II |
| Milestone; 54.04793°N 1.33501°W | | 19th century | The milestone on the east side of the B6265 road is in gritstone. It has a triangular plan and a sloping top. The cast iron plates have been removed from the sides. | II |
