= Holy Trinity Church, Little Ouseburn =

Coordinates: 54.0443°N 1.3107°W

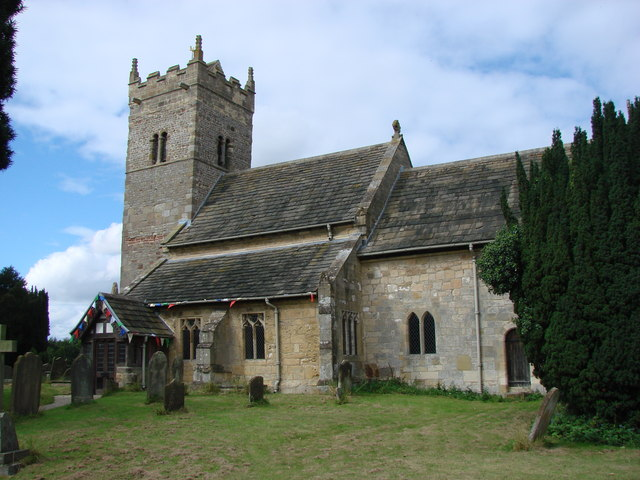
- Holy Trinity Church, Little Ouseburn, from the south-east

- Location in North Yorkshire
- OS grid reference: SE 45237 61139
- Location: Little Ouseburn, North Yorkshire
- Country: England
- Denomination: Anglican
- Website: Holy Trinity, Little Ouseburn

History
- Status: Parish church

Architecture
- Functional status: Active
- Heritage designation: Grade I
- Designated: 15 March 1966
- Architect: Paley and Austin (rebuilding)
- Architectural type: Church

Administration
- Province: York
- Diocese: Leeds
- Archdeaconry: Richmond
- Deanery: Ripon
- Parish: Little Ouseburn

Clergy
- Vicar: Sarah Feaster

Holy Trinity Church stands to the northeast of the village of Little Ouseburn, North Yorkshire, England. It is an Anglican parish church in the deanery of Ripon, the archdeaconry of Richmond, and the Diocese of Leeds. Its benefice is united with those of five local churches. The church is recorded in the National Heritage List for England as a designated Grade I listed building.

== History ==
The tower and chancel date from the 11th century, the south aisle, arcades and the chancel arch from the 14th century, and the battlements and pinnacles on the tower from the 15th century. In 1874–75 the north aisle was rebuilt to provide an organ chamber and a vestry, and the east window was altered, the architects being the Lancaster partnership of Paley and Austin. Also during the 19th century the porch was added.

== Architecture ==
=== Exterior ===
The older parts of the church are constructed in stone rubble, and the newer parts in dressed sandstone. The porch is timber-framed on stone, and the roofs are in stone flags. The plan of the church consists of a two-bay nave, north and south aisles, a south porch, a north organ chamber, a chancel with a north vestry, and a west tower. The tower is in three stages with an embattled parapet with pinnacles, a saddleback roof, and a weathervane in the form of a cockerel. On the south and west sides of the tower are round-headed windows. The louvred bell openings are in pairs and are round-headed. On the side of the south aisle is a gabled porch, with two two-light square-headed windows to the east of it. The east window of the aisle has three lights, under a lintel consisting of a re-used grave slab carved with a wheelcross. On the south side of the chancel is a round-arched priest's door between pairs of lancet windows. On the side of the north aisle are two three-light square-headed windows and the organ chamber. The vestry has a north three-light window and two lancets on the east side. The east window in the chancel has five lights under a pointed arch. At the west end of the south aisle are fragments of an early sculpture. On the gable at the east end of the nave is a finial consisting of a wheelcross.

=== Interior ===
The tower arch has a round head; the chancel arch is pointed. The arcades have pointed arches carried on octagonal piers. In the south wall of the chancel is a recess for an aumbry, and a damaged piscina. There is another aumbry recess in the wall of the south aisle. One of the pews in the church is carved with a poppyhead and a parrot. Other pews are carved with poppyheads, these dating probably from the 19th century. The two-manual organ was built in 1872 by Brindley and Foster.

== Thompson Mausoleum ==
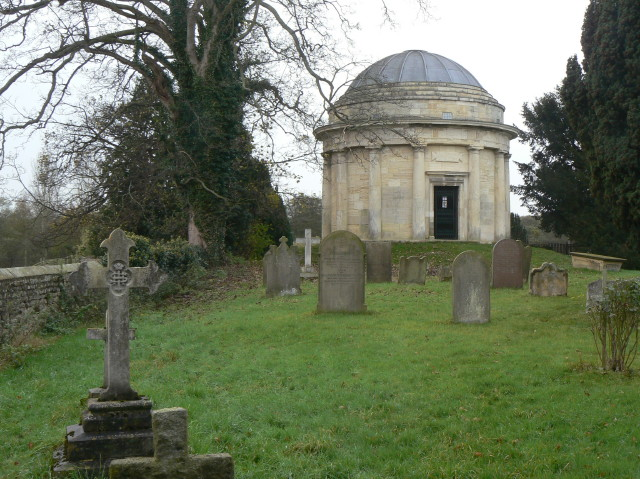
Mausoleum

To the southwest of the church is a mausoleum dating from the middle of the 18th century. It was built for Henry Thompson of nearby Kirby Hall who died in 1760. The mausoleum is constructed in sandstone ashlar and has a lead roof. It consists of a rotunda surrounded by a Greek Doric colonnade with a triglyph frieze and cornice; it is surmounted by a drum with a domed roof. It is a Grade II* listed building.

== See also ==
- Grade I listed buildings in North Yorkshire (district)
- Listed buildings in Little Ouseburn
- List of ecclesiastical works by Paley and Austin
