= Moat Hall =

House in Little Ouseburn, North Yorkshire, England

Coordinates: 54°02′35″N 1°18′41″W

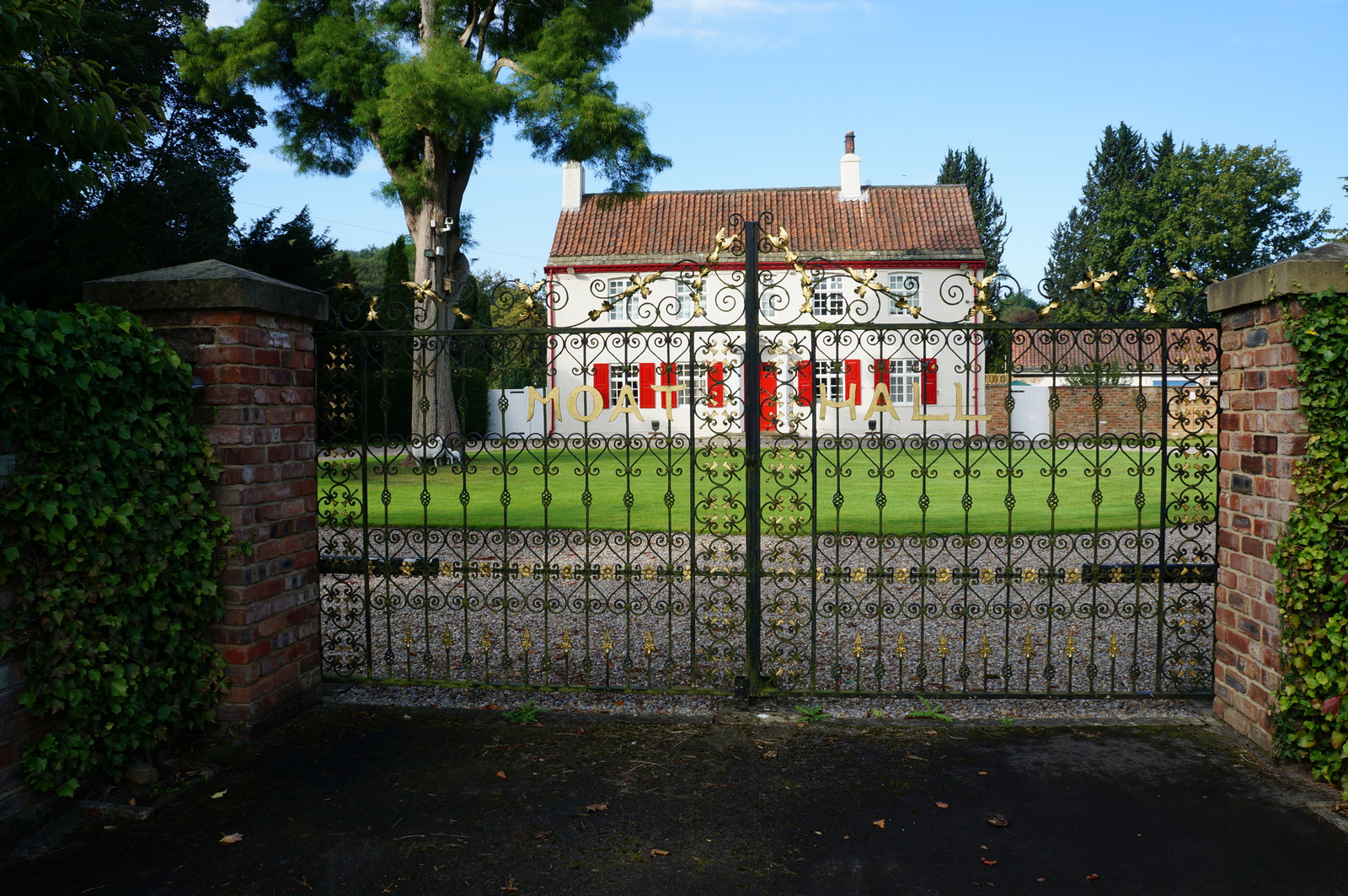
The house, in 2014

Moat Hall is a historic building in Little Ouseburn, a village in North Yorkshire, in England.

The house was originally timber framed, and was constructed in or before the 17th century. Ivan Broadhead claims that some of its beams are 800 years old, and that some of the stones used in its construction are Roman. The house was largely rebuilt in the early or mid 18th century, was altered later in the century, and then extended in the late 19th century, before being altered again in the 20th century. In 1943, it was commandeered for use by the Women's Land Army, and it was bombed during the war. It was grade II listed in 1966.

The exterior of the house is rendered and colourwashed with a modillion eaves cornice. The roof of the front range is in pantile with a stone slate verge, and the rear of the roof is in slate. There are two storeys, a triple-depth plan, and a front range of five bays. The central doorway has fluted pilaster jambs, a blocked radial fanlight, and an open pediment. On the front are cross windows, those in the upper floor with cambered heads. In the right return is a mullioned and transomed window, and on the left return is a sundial. Inside are an early staircase and fireplaces, a reused 17th-century door, and visible beams.

In September 2026 Moat Hall was offered as the main prize in the Omaze Yorkshire House IV' competition in support of Blood Cancer UK.

== See also ==
- Listed buildings in Little Ouseburn
