= Listed buildings in Kirby Hall, Harrogate =

Kirby Hall is a civil parish in the county of North Yorkshire, England. It contains 14 listed buildings that are recorded in the National Heritage List for England. Of these, one is listed at Grade II*, the middle of the three grades, and the others are at Grade II, the lowest grade. The parish does not contain any settlements, and its major building was the country house, Kirby Hall. Most of the house has been demolished, but some remains have survived, together with its former service wing, both of which are listed. Many of the other listed buildings are associated with the house, and the others include a bridge, farmhouses and farm buildings.

== Key ==
Grade	Criteria
II*	Particularly important buildings of more than special interest
II	Buildings of national importance and special interest

== Buildings ==
Name and location	Photograph	Date	Notes	Grade
Walls and hothouses south of Kirby Hall; 54.04002°N 1.30229°W	—	18th century	The garden walls are in orange-red brick with flat sandstone coping, whitewashed on the east side, and pilaster piers. The hothouses date from the 19th century.	II
Outbuilding north of Kirby Hall; 54.04343°N 1.30185°W	—	18th century	A summerhouse, later used for other purposes, in orange-red brick with plastered columns and a slate roof. There is one storey and a rectangular plan. It has a hexastyle Ionic temple front, with dentilled cornices, an entablature and a pediment, and a paved area.	II
Little Ouseburn Bridge; 54.04421°N 1.30927°W		Mid 18th century	The bridge carries New Road over Ouse Gill Beck, and is in red brick with sandstone dressings. The bridge consists of three semicircular arches, the middle arch higher, and has square piers, a band, and a plain parapet with cambered coping. It is flanked by raked abutments.	II
Gates, piers, walls and railings, New Lodge; 54.04078°N 1.31088°W		18th century	The carriage gateway is the older, with the pedestrian gateway and walls dating from the 19th century, and they are in limestone. The carriage gates are in wrought iron and delicately decorated. The gate piers are square and about 4 metres (13 ft) high, with banded rustication. Each pier has a frieze with triglyphs and rosettes, above which is a moulded cornice and ball finials on voluted pedestals. The pedestrian gates are in cast iron, and the piers are about 3 metres (9.8 ft) high and less ornate. The quadrant walls have a moulded plinth and coping, and the railings have urn finials. The end piers have moulded cornices and pyramidal caps.	II*
Ice house northeast of Old Lodge; 54.04617°N 1.30594°W		18th century	The ice house is in red brick. It consists of a barrel-vaulted tunnel leading to a circular ice chamber with a domed roof, and is sunk into the ground.	II
[[Kirby Hall, Harrogate#The hall|]] 54.04247°N 1.30229°W		c. 1747–52	The service wing of a former country house converted into a house in about 1920. It is in limestone on a plinth, partly rendered, with floor bands, a moulded eaves cornice, and a slate roof. There are two storeys and an attic, and two bays, and a single-storey four-bay wing recessed on the right. The windows are sashes. In the left return is the doorcase re-set from the original house. It is in sandstone, with a moulded surround, and a cornice hood on scrolled consoles.	II
Remains of former Kirby Hall, gateway and walls 54.04230°N 1.30260°W	—	c. 1747–52	The remains are in limestone, and include a seven-bay house wall, and an angle and quadrant wall at the left. This contains a segmental-arched opening with a rusticated surround, a moulded cornice, and ball finials. The forecourt wall has a plinth, pilaster piers and ball finials, and is partly balustraded. The carriage gate piers are square, and rusticated, with moulded bases, moulded cornices, stepped-up caps and pineapple finials.	II
Barn north of Kirby Hall; 54.04321°N 1.30282°W	—	c. 1755	The barn is in orange-pink brick on a plinth, with sandstone dressings, a moulded eaves cornice, and a corrugated asbestos roof. There are two storeys, nine bays on the front and three on the returns. The fronts contain blind recessed arches with an impost band. In the centre of the front range is an entrance, and above the impost band are lunettes. The gable ends are pedimented.	II
Stable buildings northwest of Kirby Hall; 54.04292°N 1.30264°W		c. 1755	The stable buildings form four ranges round a courtyard. They are in orange-pink brick, with sandstone dressings, an impost band, an eaves cornice, and hipped slate roofs. The main range has two storeys, a central bay with an open pediment, and flanking two-bay wings. In the centre is a carriage arch, and on the roof is a stone-banded octagonal cupola with a clock face, a timber lantern, and a wrought iron weathervane. The flanking bays contain sash windows in recessed blind arches, and above are lunettes.	II
Old Lodge; 54.04579°N 1.30717°W		c. 1814	The lodge, designed by Robert Lugar, is in limestone and has overhanging eaves and a pyramidal slate roof. There is a single storey and one bay. Projecting from the front is a porch with a pediment, containing a round-arched doorway with voussoirs and a hood mould. In each return is a round-headed casement window in a round-arched recess with an archivolt of voussoirs.	II
Kirby Hall Farmhouse; 54.03916°N 1.30945°W	—	Early 19th century	The farmhouse is in orange-red brick, with a dentilled eaves band, and a stone slate roof, hipped on the wings. In the centre is a projecting bay with two storeys and an attic, flanking it are wings with two storeys and one bay. In the centre is a two-storey round-arched recess with an impost band. The windows are small-pane casements, and the entrance is in the right return.	II
Farm buildings southeast of Kirby Hall Farmhouse; 54.03884°N 1.30900°W	—	Mid 19th century	The farm buildings are in brownish brick with a pantile roof, and surround a rectangular yard. They consist of a threshing barn and a horse-engine house, cart and shelter sheds with lofts, and attached ranges of byres, stables and loose boxes at the rear. The barn has two storeys and seven bays, protruding from its centre is a polygonal horse-engine house, and to the right are three elliptical-arched cart entries.	II
Foldyard southwest of Kirby Hall Farmhouse; 54.03898°N 1.30987°W	—	Mid 19th century	The foldyard is in pink brick, and has a flattened pyramidal pantile roof in two levels, It consists of four single-story ranges, with the entrance on the east. This is flanked by doorways, and windows with cambered arches, and at the left end are flat-arched cart openings.	II
New Lodge and rear wall 54.04096°N 1.31071°W		Mid 19th century	The lodge is in limestone, with a continuous impost band, an entablature a dentilled eaves cornice, and a slate roof. There is one storey, a cruciform plan, and a front of three bays. On the front is a tetrastyle Tuscan portico with a pediment. The windows are round-headed sashes, on the front with keystones, and on the returns under pedimented gables. The rear walls have flat coping and contain a square-headed doorway.	II
