= Listed buildings in Thorpe Underwoods =

Thorpe Underwoods is a civil parish in the county of North Yorkshire, England. It contains nine listed buildings that are recorded in the National Heritage List for England. Of these, one is listed at Grade II*, the middle of the three grades, and the others are at Grade II, the lowest grade. The parish contains the village of Thorpe Underwood and the surrounding countryside, and the listed buildings consist of houses, farmhouses and farm buildings, and two boundary stones.

== Key ==
Grade	Criteria
II*	Particularly important buildings of more than special interest
II	Buildings of national importance and special interest

== Buildings ==
Name and location	Photograph	Date	Notes	Grade
Monks House; 54.02900°N 1.29423°W	—	17th century	The house has been extended, the original part is in red brick, the extension is in orange-red brick, there is an eaves string course, and the roofs are in stone slate with a brick coped shaped gables. There are two storeys and an L-shaped plan, with a front range of three bays. Most of the windows in the original part are mullioned or mullioned and transomed, and on the extension are casement windows, and horizontally sliding sashes.	II
Moss Hill Farmhouse; 54.02218°N 1.28270°W		Late 18th century	The farmhouse is in red brick with a pantile roof. There are two storeys and three bays, and a lower two-storey two-bay wing on the right. The doorway has a fanlight, the windows are sashes, and all the openings have flat arches of gauged brick.	II
Farm buildings northeast of Low Farmhouse; 54.03817°N 1.29417°W		Early 19th century	The farm buildings consist of a threshing barn and cart shed, and ranges of cow byres, loose boxes and stables. They are in red brick, with some timber framing, they have pantile roofs, and form a square foldyard. At the front is a barn range with two storeys and six bays, with single-storey ranges at the rear. On the front is a full-height opening under a cambered relieving arch, three segmental cart arches, and a round-headed loft opening.	II
Pool Spring Farmhouse; 54.01401°N 1.27494°W	—	Early 19th century	The farmhouse is in orange-red brick, with a dentilled eaves band, and a roof of pantile and stone slate. There are two storeys and three bays. The doorway has a divided fanlight, and the windows are sashes under cambered arches of gauged brick.	II
Thorpe Hill Farmhouse; 54.02609°N 1.30616°W		Early 19th century	The farmhouse is in mottled plum brick, with floor and attic bands, a dentilled eaves band, and a pyramidal stone slate roof. There two storeys and an attic, and three bays. The doorway has a divided fanlight, the middle window in the attic storey is blocked, and the others are sashes. All the openings have flat arches of gauged bricks.	II
Boundary stone at SE4501058640; 54.02183°N 1.31449°W		Mid-19th century (probable)	The boundary stone at the junction of Score Ray Lane and the B6265 road is in sandstone. It has a triangular plan and a sloped upper face, and is about 0.75 metres (2 ft 6 in) in height. The upper face is inscribed with "B S".	II
Boundary stone at SE4488958888; 54.02409°N 1.31628°W	—	Mid-19th century (probable)	The boundary stone near a junction of the B6265 road is in sandstone. It has a triangular plan and a sloped upper face, and is about 0.3 metres (1 ft 0 in) in height. The upper face is inscribed with "B S" and "OSBM".	II
Low Farmhouse; 54.03807°N 1.29451°W	—	Mid-19th century	The farmhouse is in orange-red brick, with sandstone dressings, and a pantile roof with coped gables and moulded kneelers. The main block has two storeys and three bays, there is a wing on the left with one storey and an attic, and a single-storey outbuilding further to the left. The doorway is arched, and has a double chamfered surround under a square head. The windows on the front are mullioned and transomed, and at the rear they have flat arches of gauged brick.	II
Thorpe Underwood Hall; 54.02722°N 1.29431°W		1902–03	A country house, later a school, designed by Walter Brierley, it is in red brick on a chamfered brick plinth, with sandstone dressings and a slate roof. The entrance front has two storeys and five bays, with a two-storey service bay at the left. The end and centre bays project, the end bays with shaped gables, and the centre bay with a parapet. In the centre is a square-headed doorcase containing a doorway with a double-chamfered surround and a Tudor arch. The spandrels are decorated, and the lintel is inscribed. Flanking the doorway are heraldic beasts, and above it is a decorated shield. Most of the windows are mullioned or mullioned and transomed, and there are half-hipped dormers. On the garden front are three bay windows, the middle one canted and the outer ones square.	II*
