= Thorpe Underwood, North Yorkshire =

Village and civil parish in North Yorkshire, England

Coordinates: 54°01′44″N 1°17′40″W

Thorpe Underwood
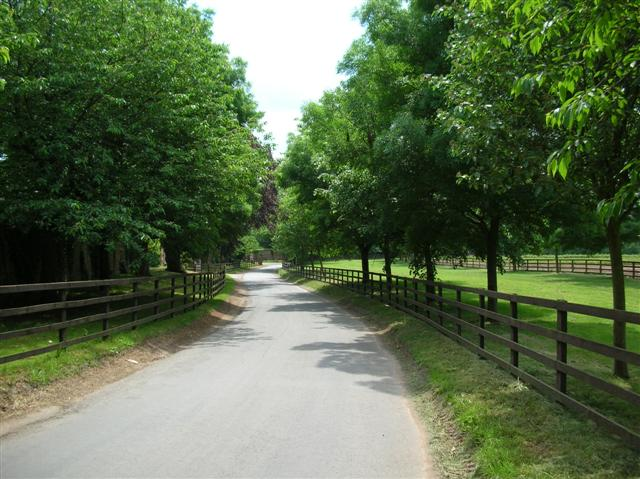

- Location within North Yorkshire
- Area: 16.41 km^{2} (6.34 sq mi)
- Population: 793 (2011 census)
  - Density: 48/km^{2} (120/sq mi)
- Civil parish: Thorpe Underwoods
- Unitary authority: North Yorkshire
- Ceremonial county: North Yorkshire
- Region: Yorkshire and the Humber
- Country: England
- Sovereign state: United Kingdom
- Police: North Yorkshire
- Fire: North Yorkshire
- Ambulance: Yorkshire

Thorpe Underwood is a settlement and (as Thorpe Underwoods) a civil parish about 10 miles (16 km) north of York, in the county of North Yorkshire, England. In 2011 the parish had a population of 793. The parish touches Aldwark, Green Hammerton, Kirby Hall, Linton-on-Ouse, Little Ouseburn, Nun Monkton and Whixley. Thorpe Underwoods shares a parish council with Little Ouseburn and Kirby Hall called "Little Ouseburn Grouped Parish Council".

Until 1974 it was part of the West Riding of Yorkshire. From 1974 to 2023 it was part of the Borough of Harrogate, it is now administered by the unitary North Yorkshire Council.

== Landmarks ==
There are nine Listed buildings in Thorpe Underwoods.

== History ==
The name "Thorpe" means 'Outlying farm/settlement'. Thorpe Underwood was recorded in the Domesday Book as Tuadestorp. Thorpe Green was recorded as being a hamlet in the township of Thorpe Underwood, it is where the modern Thorpe Underwood hamlet is. Thorpe Underwoods was formerly a township in the parish of Little Ouseburn, in 1866 Thorpe Underwoods became a civil parish in its own right.
