= Little Ouseburn =

Village and civil parish in North Yorkshire, England

Coordinates: 54°02′25″N 1°19′11″W

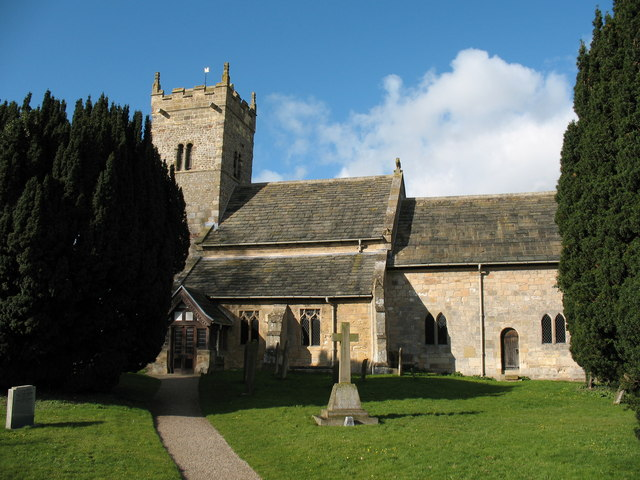
- Holy Trinity Church on Church Lane

- Location within North Yorkshire
- Population: 264 (2011 census)
- OS grid reference: SE447606
- Civil parish: Little Ouseburn
- Unitary authority: North Yorkshire
- Ceremonial county: North Yorkshire
- Region: Yorkshire and the Humber
- Country: England
- Sovereign state: United Kingdom
- Post town: York
- Postcode district: YO26
- Police: North Yorkshire
- Fire: North Yorkshire
- Ambulance: Yorkshire
- UK Parliament: Wetherby and Easingwold

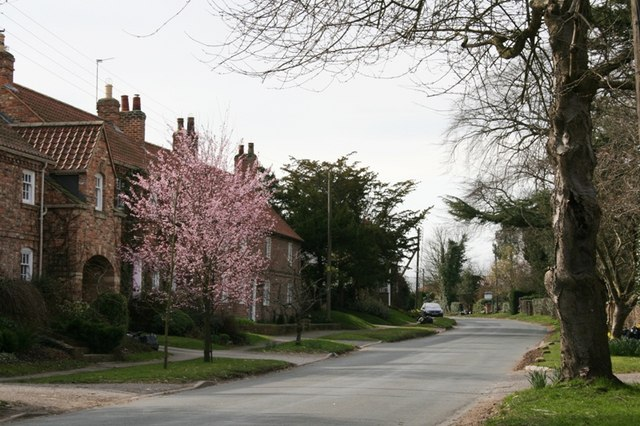
Main Street in Little Ouseburn

Little Ouseburn is a small village and civil parish in the county and unitary authority area of North Yorkshire, England. It is situated near the A1(M) motorway and 6 miles (9.7 km) south-east of Boroughbridge. It consists of two roads, Main Street which is the residential area, and Church Lane which contains a Holy Trinity Church that is a grade I listed building. (see 'External Links' below for a survey of the burials in the churchyard) It also has a small brick bridge over a stream which leads to Great Ouseburn. According to the 2011 census data the total population of Little Ouseburn is 264.

== History and population ==
Little Ouseburn is listed (alongside Great Ouseburn) in the Domesday Book as having three plough lands and three villagers. The name of the village derives from Ouse Beck, which divides Great and Little Ouseburn, with the beck being a tributary of the River Ouse. The village is set out along both sides of Main Street, which runs on an east–west orientation. Most of the villagers were either tenant farmers or workers for the nearby Kirby Hall estate, which is on the eastern side of the village across the Ouse Beck. Kirby Hall was designed by Roger Morris and built by John Carr. The hall was demolished in the 1920s and the estate broken up, with most of the houses and land being sold to the villagers. A portion of the house exists as Kirby Hall and is a grade II listed structure.

In the 1870s Little Ouseburn was described as:

OUSEBURN (Little), a village, a township, and a parish in Great Ouseburn district, W. R. Yorkshire. The village stands ¾ of a mile S of Great Ouseburn village, and 3¼ N by W of Cattal r. station; and has a post-office under York.

Until 1974 it was part of the West Riding of Yorkshire. From 1974 to 2023 it was part of the Borough of Harrogate, it is now administered by the unitary North Yorkshire Council.

During the Second World War, the Moat Hall, a mansion house between the village and the church, was used as a hostel for some Land Army girls. The Moat Hall and the land between the church were bombed, which is thought to be an overrun of a bombing sortie on the nearby RAF Linton-on-Ouse. Also during the war, a bomber from RAF Tholthorpe lost control in icy conditions and crashed near to the church damaging the mausoleum and the church building.

Census data shows that the population of Little Ouseburn dropped significantly between the years of 1840 and 1880 from around 600 to 250. The 2001 census data stated that there were 226 people living in the parish, since then the population has increased and the 2011 census data states that there are now 264 people living in Little Ouseburn.

== Geography ==
The village lies just to the east of the B6265 road which links Boroughbridge with the A59 road and is part of Dere Street. The village is 6 miles (9.7 km) south-east of Boroughbridge, 8 miles (13 km) east of Knaresborough, and 13 miles (21 km) north-west of York.

== Industry ==
According to data from the 1831 census the primary industry in Little Ouseburn was focused on agriculture with almost 75% of men aged over 20 being involved in it. This was reflected by the social status of the people living in Little Ouseburn with around half of them being labourers. This was almost entirely just men, with women taking on the more traditional domestic chores. The 1881 census data shows how many people were involved in an occupation and their gender. Around 30 men worked in agriculture, 15 women in domestic service, but around 40 women were in unknown occupations. There was very little else the population was involved in. 2001 census data shows that in more recent times the occupation of the inhabitants has shifted to manufacturing and retail with few people left working in agriculture.

== Housing ==
As with the population between 1840 and 1880, the number of houses in Little Ouseburn shrunk significantly. This is most likely due to boundary changes. The number of houses began to increase after 1920. Before 1920 a very small percentage of houses were unoccupied. After 1920, every house has been occupied. According to 2011 data there are 110 households and 223 vehicles. 43.6% of the households have two vehicles and 8.2% have four or more.

== See also ==
- Listed buildings in Little Ouseburn
