= Givendale =

Civil parish in North Yorkshire, England

- Civil parish
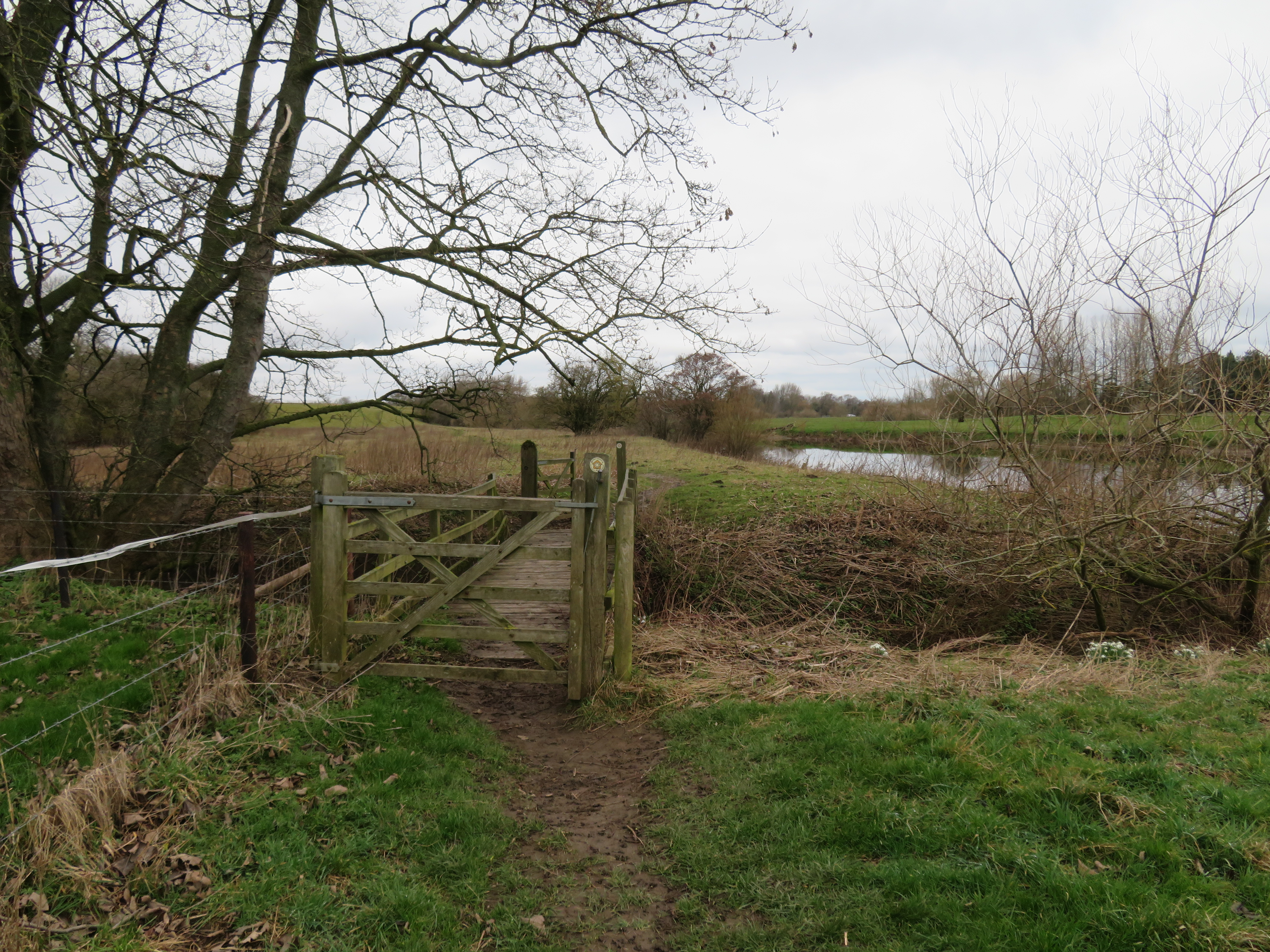
- A footbridge in the parish
- Interactive map of Givendale
- Coordinates: 54.113°N 1.479°W
- Country: England
- County: North Yorkshire

Area
  - Total: 342.51 ha (846.4 acres)
- (in 2017)
- Elevation: 26 m (85 ft)

Population (2021)
  - Total: 10
  - Density: 2.9/km^{2} (7.6/sq mi)
- Time zone: UTC00:00
- Post Code: HG4 5AD
- ONS parish code: E04007347

Givendale is a civil parish and former settlement in North Yorkshire, England. It lies 2.5 miles (4 km) to the south-east of Ripon, and 3.5 miles (5.6 km) west of Boroughbridge. Records indicate the name Gherindale appearing before the Domesday survey, with religious connections to the minster (later cathedral) at nearby Ripon. No village exists within the parish, but a deserted village is thought to have been extant until the 16th century. The village and township of Givendale was in the West Riding of Yorkshire historically, but it was moved into North Yorkshire in 1974 when the boundaries changed.

== History ==
Givendale is mentioned in the Domesday Book as Gherindale, but it is recorded three centuries before that as being one of the manors that contributed to the building of what is now Ripon Cathedral. Another document that predates the Domesday survey is from 1030, which describes Givendale as "Gyðling-dale" and having one hide of land belonging to the priest at Givendale, and eights hides belonging to the Soke of Ripon. The name derives from Old English of Gyðlinga and dale, the first part being a personal name, most likely Gefwine (the dale of Gefwine).

A manor house was located in the parish at SE336933, which was acquired by the Ward family before 1266. All that remains of this house is a moat, which has a disparity in the size of the moat on some sides. This has led to speculation that the manor house was built on a curve of the River Ure, which has since moved westwards, and left prime sand and gravel resources in the parish which have been exploited commercially. Evidence of this is also to be found in what is now labelled as Great Givendale on Ordnance Survey mapping; at the eastern edge of the buildings there is a supposed watermill (SE338610) which is now in the middle of a field with the water of the river about 0.5 kilometres (0.31 mi) further west. In 1316, Simon Ward (or Warde) was listed as holding the manor along with Newby (which surrounded Newby Hall). The Ward family had been landholders in the area for some time before taking on the manor house, and they also held land in Baildon and Guiseley, also both in the West Riding. The last male heir of the Ward line died out in 1523, which is possibly when the village was abandoned.

A church or chapel has been identified in the parish; a document from Ripon Minster in 1275 indicates an agreement for a chapel, and another document of 1413 refers to a prebend at Geuendale. Givendale was one of seven pebendal estates that surrounded Ripon and provided money and provisions for the cathedral; (Note: The other six pebendal estates were; Thorpe (Littlethorpe), Monkton, Givendale and Skelton, Nunwick, Studley Magna, Sharow, and Stanwick St John. These were listed in 1301 in this way as the smallest return to the largest, Stanwick St John being the wealthiest.) it is mentioned along with nearby Aismunderby as giving money to help with the construction of Ripon Minster in the 8th century. According to a reference from 1410, the chapel is thought to have been dedicated to St Thomas. The office of the prebend ceased in 1548, though a Prebendal seat still exists in Ripon cathedral; James Stanley was incumbent of this office in the 15th-century. York Minster also has a seat dedicated to the Prebend of Givendale, but that seat relates to the Givendale in the East Riding.

The parish is devoid of a village, but it is recorded that it had a village in Medieval times. The outline of the village (at SE337691) could still be seen on aerial photographs until the 1960s, but since then, the ploughing of the fields has erased all evidence of village structures. The parish was registered in tax documents, one from 1297 showed that Givendale paid almost the same amount of tax as nearby Sharow, but by 1801, the population of Sharow was 106, whereas the tax assessor only had one house to visit in Givendale Parish. The total size of the parish in 1871 was 338 hectares (836 acres), 360 hectares (889 acres) in 1964, and in 2017, it covered an area of 342.51 hectares (846.4 acres). The civil parish of Givendale was in the Liberty of Ripon, and also in the Ecclesiastical Parish of Ripon.

Although the parish area is on the northern/eastern bank of the River Ure, which was traditionally the dividing line between the counties of Yorkshire, the parish and settlement used to be in the West Riding of Yorkshire, with its eastern edge being the border with the old North Riding. At the county boundary changeover in 1974, Givendale Civil Parish was transferred from the old West Riding to the newer county of North Yorkshire. At the time of the Domesday survey, the parish was in the wapentake of Hallikeld, but was later in the wapentake of Lower Claro. Givendale was a township in the ancient parish of Ripon until 1866, when it was created as its own civil parish.

The parish is on the eastern bank of the River Ure, some 2.5 miles (4 km) south-east of Ripon and 3.5 miles (5.6 km) west of Boroughbridge. It includes Givendale Lake, a former aggregates quarry that has been flooded, and which is now used for sailing by the White Rose Sailing Association. The parish ONS code is E04007347, and the postcode is HG4 5AD, under the post town of Ripon.

=== Population ===
Population of Givendale 1801–2021
Year	1801	1811	1821	1831	1841	1851	1861	1871	1881	1891	1901	1911	1921	1931	1951	1961	1971	2015	2021
Population	19	25	31	35	29	35	40	39	41	36	48	46	42	40	25	24	18	10 (Note: Estimated)	16
County	West Riding of Yorkshire																	North Yorks	
Type	Township							Civil parish											

== See also ==
- Listed buildings in Givendale (Besides the two listed buildings wholly within the parish, part of the Newby Hall estate (which is Grade II* listed) lies in the parish of Givendale.)
