= Aismunderby =

Deserted village in Yorkshire, England

Coordinates: 54.1103°N 1.5331°W

- Village (deserted)
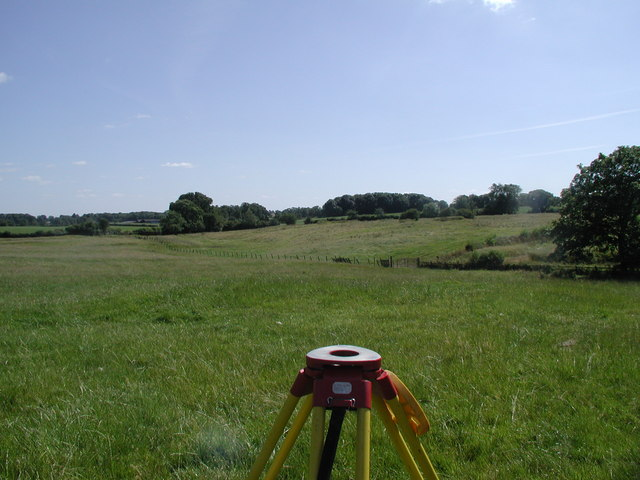
- The site of Aismunderby

- Location within North Yorkshire
- OS grid reference: SE306685
- Civil parish: Littlethorpe
- Unitary authority: North Yorkshire
- Ceremonial county: North Yorkshire
- Region: Yorkshire and the Humber
- Country: England
- Sovereign state: United Kingdom

Aismunderby is a deserted village near to Ripon in North Yorkshire, England. The site is mentioned in Domesday and was in the West Riding of Yorkshire, but was depopulated in the 16th century. The boundary changes of 1974 moved the site of the village into North Yorkshire. A separate, and later settlement, also named Aismunderby, was built on the edge of Ripon and came to be known as Aismunderby with Bondgate before becoming part of the city proper in the late 19th-century.

== History ==
Aismunderby is thought to be one of the manors that contributed to the building of what is now Ripon Cathedral in the 7th-century; a record exists showing Hasmundernes alongside Gindene (possibly Givendale) and Duninge. In 1086, the settlement is recorded as having three villagers, one ploughland, and belonging to William of Percy, with a value of 10 shillings. It was listed as being in Littlethorpe, part of the Wapentake of Burghshire, later the Wapentake of [Lower] Claro. In 1284, the area was under the possession of Ranulf de Neville, the male heir in a line traced back to William of Percy. Aismunderby was mentioned in the poll tax of 1379, and in 1472, the tax rolls state that the village belonged to Sir Thomas Markenfield, being worth £6, 13s, and 4d, and with a taxable value of £6.

By 1822, a township named Aismunderby-with-Bondgate was part of the Ecclesiastical Parish of Ripon, but was significantly further north-eastwards than the original settlement. The deserted village of Aismunderby was also part of the Ripon Ecclesiastical Parish.

The name of the settlement is recorded as either Asmundrebi or Hashundebi in the Domesday Book. It derives from the Old Norse of Asmundr which is a personal name (from which the Anglicized name of Osmund derives) and bȳ, which means the farmstead or village of Asmundr.

The village was on the south-western side of the city of Ripon (now North Yorkshire, but originally in the West Riding of Yorkshire) and formed a township with Bondgate, the name of which still exists as a suburb of the Ripon. (Note: Bondgate is so named as it was on the bounds of the city of Ripon.) The deserted village is known to have had a place of worship dedicated to St John the Baptist, as it is mentioned in a charter from c. 1204 when Roger, son of Ralph (of the Percy family), gifted some land to "the chaplain and clerk ministering there." An archaeological investigation of the Medieval chapel was undertaken in the 1960s, and the location of the chapel is marked on mapping as Chapel Garths (SE305685). The excavation revealed a building which was rectangular and about 27 feet (8.2 m) long by 15 feet (4.6 m) wide on a rough east-west alignment.

A second manor at Asmunderby is also mentioned as belonging to the Archbishop of York. It is thought that Aismunderby was depopulated by 1540.

=== City village ===
A later settlement with the same name developed on the southern side of Ripon, 0.25 miles (0.40 km) away from the city centre, which was integrated into the city from the previous rural district in the late 19th-century. In 1871 it was described as being "south of the city... and consists of about a dozen scattered houses." (Note: This contrasts sharply with a report to Parliament at the time of the 1821 census which recorded the township as having 114 houses, with 121 families, broken down as 278 males and 273 women.)

Population of Aismunderby (1673), and Aismunderby (with Bondgate) 1801–1901
Year	1673	1801	1811	1821	1831	1841	1851	1861	1871	1881	1891	1901
Population	135 (Note: Estimated)	496	521	551	655	614	607	620	732	815	852	1,116

Between 1801 and 1831, the population of Markenfield was included in the statistics of Aismunderby with Bondgate. The civil parish of Aismunderby-with-Bondgate was abolished in 1894, and divided between the parishes of Littlethorpe and Ripon, with the former area of Aismunderby deserted village now wholly within the parish of Littlethorpe. Aismunderby-with-Bondgate now forms a suburb of Ripon which is connected by Bondgate Bridge, but the deserted village of Aismunderby lies further south by the A61 road.
