= Hollin Hall =

Hollin Hall may refer to:

- Hollin Hall (Virginia), United States
- Hollin Old Hall, Cheshire, England
- Hollin Hall, Cumbria, Crook, Cumbria, England
- Hollin Hall, Littlethorpe, North Yorkshire England
