= Copt Hewick =

Village and civil parish in North Yorkshire, England

Coordinates: 54°08′10″N 1°28′56″W

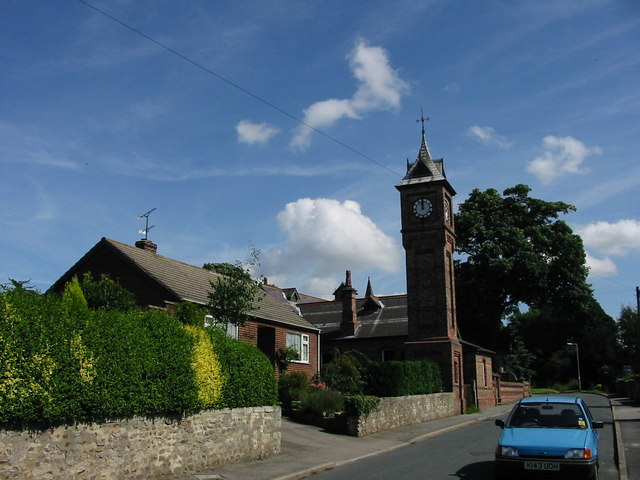
- The clock tower of Copt Hewick Village Hall

- Location within North Yorkshire
- Population: 253 (Including Bridge Hewick and Givendale, 2011 census)
- OS grid reference: SE 33755 70974
- Unitary authority: North Yorkshire
- Ceremonial county: North Yorkshire
- Region: Yorkshire and the Humber
- Country: England
- Sovereign state: United Kingdom
- Post town: RIPON
- Postcode district: HG4
- Police: North Yorkshire
- Fire: North Yorkshire
- Ambulance: Yorkshire

Copt Hewick is a village and civil parish in the county of North Yorkshire, England. The village lies about two miles east of Ripon. It had a population of 180 in 2004 according to the North Yorkshire County Council, increasing to 253 at the 2011 census.

Until 1974 it was part of the West Riding of Yorkshire. From 1974 to 2023 it was part of the Borough of Harrogate, it is now administered by the unitary North Yorkshire Council.

The name of the village derives from the Old English Coppede hēah wīc, which means High specialised farm. The Copt element refers to the hill that the village stands on.

The village is home to Holy Innocents Church, Copt Hewick, which forms a group with a school and clock tower, all built in 1876.

== See also ==
- Listed buildings in Copt Hewick
