= St Michael and All Angels' Church, Littlethorpe =

Anglican church in North Yorkshire, England

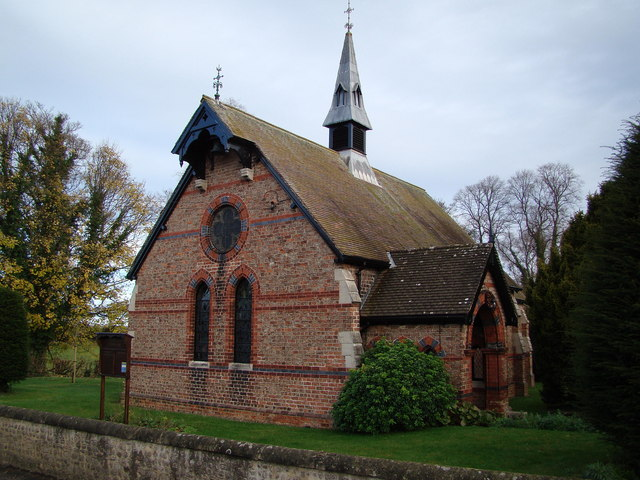
- St Michael and All Angels' Church, Littlethorpe (photograph by David Rogers)
- St Michael and All Angels' Church, Littlethorpe
- 53°7′6.79″N 1°30′21.48″W
- OS grid reference: SE 32369 69320
- Location: Littlethorpe, North Yorkshire
- Country: England
- Denomination: Church of England

History
- Dedication: St Michael and All Angels
- Consecrated: 23 April 1878

Architecture
- Heritage designation: Grade II listed
- Architect: Robert Hargreave Brodrick
- Construction cost: £700

Specifications
- Capacity: 120 people

Administration
- Province: Province of York
- Diocese: Diocese of Leeds
- Archdeaconry: Cathedral
- Deanery: Cathedral
- Parish: Ripon Cathedral Parish with Littlethorpe

St Michael and All Angels’ Church, Littlethorpe is a Grade II listed parish church in the Church of England in Littlethorpe, North Yorkshire England.

== History ==
The site for the church was given by Mr Denison of Scarborough. It was built to designs of the architect Robert Hargreave Brodrick. The church includes a nave, chancel, apsidal vestry, organ chamber, south porch, and bell cote. Constructed using brick with stone accents, it features window jambs and string courses made of molded red and blue Staffordshire bricks. The roof is covered with Staffordshire flat tiles. The floor was laid with Maw's encaustic tiles, and the church was lit with a brass gas corona. Warming stoves by Musgrave and Co of Belfast were installed. The church was consecrated on 23 April 1878 by the Bishop of Ripon.

== See also ==
- Listed buildings in Littlethorpe, North Yorkshire
