= Listed buildings in Littlethorpe, North Yorkshire =

Littlethorpe is a civil parish in the county of North Yorkshire, England. It contains 13 listed buildings that are recorded in the National Heritage List for England. Of these, one is listed at Grade II*, the middle of the three grades, and the others are at Grade II, the lowest grade. The parish contains the village of Littlethorpe and the surrounding countryside. The most important building in the parish is the country house, Hollin Hall, which is listed together with a number of associated buildings. The other listed buildings are smaller houses and associated structures, and a church.

== Key ==
Grade	Criteria
II*	Particularly important buildings of more than special interest
II	Buildings of national importance and special interest

== Buildings ==
Name and location	Photograph	Date	Notes	Grade
Hollin Hall; 54.10067°N 1.52272°W	—	Late 17th century	A country house, the main ranges in stuccoed and painted red brick, with stone dressings, quoins, and stone slate roofs, and the outbuildings in brick and stone with pantile roofs. The plan is complicated, and consists of a main range with two storeys and an L-shaped plan, with an entrance front of five bays, and a south front of six bays, a two-storey L-shaped service wing to the north, and an L-shaped range of outbuildings with one and two storeys further to the north. The middle bay of the entrance front projects under a pediment containing an oeil-de-boeuf, and the outer bays also project. In the centre is a portico with paired Tuscan columns carrying an entablature, a cornice and a blocking course. There is a floor band and a dentilled eaves cornice, and the windows are sashes.	II*
Whitcliffe Hall; 54.11551°N 1.54586°W	—	Late 17th century	A house that has been altered, in limestone, with quoins, and a pantile roof with two eaves courses of stone, kneelers and stone gable coping. There are two storeys and an attic, and three bays. On the front is a doorway with a fanlight, and casement windows. To the right is a blocked segmental-arched doorway. The rear is more complex, and includes blocked mullioned and transomed windows, and a moulded string course.	II
Sundial west of Hollin Hall; 54.10049°N 1.52298°W	—	1681	The sundial is in gritstone and is about 80 centimetres (31 in) high. It consists of a pillar with a crudely-cut base, and a square shaft with roll moulding, and inscriptions and the date on the faces. The dial is in bronze.	II
Ha ha south and east of Hollin Hall; 54.10060°N 1.52196°W	—	18th century	The ha ha is in gritstone. It is about 1.5 metres (4 ft 11 in) high and 150 metres (490 ft) long, and divides the house from the lake and the grounds.	II
Walled garden, house, gates, bothey and glasshouses, Hollin Hall; 54.09958°N 1.52564°W	—	18th century	The north garden wall is heated, it is in limestone lined with brick, and has pantile coping, flues and stoke-holes. The other walls are in brick with stone coping, and contain gateways. The former gardener's house has a stone slate roof, two storeys and three bays and contains sash windows. The bothy is a lean-to in limestone, with a corrugated asbestos roof, one storey and six bays, and the glasshouses are also lean-tos, and have an elaborate cast iron roof system.	II
Well cover southwest of Hollin Hall; 54.09957°N 1.52419°W	—	Late 18th century	The well cover is in stone and consists of an arched recess with a chamfered surround, a keystone and stone coping. The flanking walls project and slope down to ground level, enclosing a shallow pool in front of the arch.	II
Littlethorpe House; 54.11717°N 1.50629°W	—	Late 18th century	The house is rendered, and has floor and eaves bands, paired wooden gutter brackets, and a purple slate roof. There are two storeys and attics, five bays, and a two-bay service wing on the right. The central doorway has pilasters and a triangular pediment, and the windows are sashes.	II
Wall, piers, gates and railings, Littlethorpe House; 54.11714°N 1.50664°W	—	Late 18th century	The wall encloses the boundary of the house on two sides. It is in limestone, including a lower part with wrought iron railings. The piers flanking the gateways are in rusticated stone, about 2 metres (6 ft 7 in) high, each with a moulded capstone.	II
Manor House; 54.12063°N 1.50545°W	—	Late 18th to early 19th century	The house is rendered, and has gutter brackets and a stone slate roof. There are two storeys, a main range of two bays, a recessed bay to the left, and a projecting taller two-bay block to the right with a hipped roof. The doorway has a round arch with a keystone and a fanlight, and is flanked by Ionic columns carrying an open dentilled pediment. The windows are sashes in architraves, and have lintels with keystones.	II
Gates, gate piers and wall, Manor House; 54.12026°N 1.50524°W	—	Late 18th to early 19th century	The gates are in wrought iron, decorated with scrolls, and are flanked by rusticated stone gate piers. These have a square section, they are about 2 metres (6 ft 7 in) high, and each has a projecting band and a shallow pyramid finial. The wall is in limestone with flat coping, it is ramped at the northern end, and extends for about 60 metres (200 ft).	II
Stables, Hollin Hall; 54.10095°N 1.52355°W	—	Early 19th century	The stable block, later used for other purposes, is in painted limestone, with a moulded eaves band, and hipped slate roofs with two courses of stone. There is a horseshoe plan, the main range with two storeys and two bays, and the projecting wings with a single storey and three bays. In the centre of the main range is a coach house with large segmental-headed windows, and lunettes in the upper floor. The wings contain stable doors.	II
Thorpe Lodge; 54.11262°N 1.51655°W	—	Early 19th century	The house is in painted brick, with a dentilled eaves cornice, and a hipped stone slate roof. There are two storeys, a front of five bays, and a single separately roofed bay to the right. The middle bay projects, it is canted, it contains a central doorway with a fanlight, and is flanked by sash windows, all round-headed. There is a porch with paired reeded columns carrying an entablature and a dentilled cornice.	II
St Michael's Church; 54.11873°N 1.50627°W		1878	The church is in brick with polychromatic bands and dressings, and a blue slate roof. It consists of a nave, a south porch and a chancel. The porch has a gable with a bargeboard, an opening with a pointed arch and a moulded surround, and the windows are lancets. On the west gable is a cantilevered timber bell frame, and on the nave roof is a lead-covered flèche.	II
