= Listed buildings in Copt Hewick =

Copt Hewick is a civil parish in the county of North Yorkshire, England. It contains eight listed buildings that are recorded in the National Heritage List for England. All the listed buildings are designated at Grade II, the lowest of the three grades, which is applied to "buildings of national importance and special interest". The parish contains the village of Copt Hewick and the surrounding countryside. Outside the village is the country house of Copt Hewick, which is listed together with associated structures. In the village, the listed buildings are a church and a school and their boundary walls, a clock tower and a house.

== Buildings ==
Name and location	Photograph	Date	Notes
Yellow House; 54.13587°N 1.48187°W	—	Early to mid 18th century	The house is in painted brick on a stone plinth with a stone slate roof. There are two storeys, three bays, and a projecting single-storey outbuilding on the left. The doorway is in the centre, in the ground floor are four casement windows, and the other windows are horizontally-sliding sashes.
Copt Hewick Hall; 54.14048°N 1.47249°W	—	Late 18th century	A country house, it is rendered, on a stone plinth, with a dentilled eaves cornice, a hipped stone slate roof, and two storeys. The main front has six bays, the middle three bays with giant Tuscan pilasters. Curved steps lead up to a central doorway under a verandah with a lead roof on wrought iron pillars. The windows are sashes, and in the upper floor is a wrought iron balustrade. In the centre of the rear is a large Venetian window. The right return has two bays and a service range on the right, and also has a wrought iron balustrade.
Stable Courtyard, Copt Hewick Hall; 54.14068°N 1.47325°W	—	Late 18th century	The courtyard consists of stables, a coach house, a barn and a closing wall. The coach house in the west range is in brick with a hipped Westmorland slate roof, two storeys and two bays. In the ground floor are four segmental arches, above which is a band, and windows with pointed lights. On the roof is a clock tower with a wooden louvred lantern. The stable range on the south is in sandstone and brick, with stone slate roof. There are two storeys, three bays, and a single-storey single-bay block on the left, and it contains a doorway, a sash window, and pigeon holes. The barn in the north range is in sandstone with limestone quoins and a slate roof with coped gables. The wall on the eat side is in limestone, about 1.5 metres (4 ft 11 in) high, and has a central entrance flanked by square piers with ball finials.
Garden balustrade, Copt Hewick Hall; 54.14040°N 1.47279°W	—	Late 18th or early 19th century	The balustrade in the garden is in stone, about 80 centimetres (31 in) high, and encloses a gravelled area on three sides. It contains geometric patterns, and square-section piers with ball finials.
Holy Innocents Church; 54.13669°N 1.47974°W		1876	The church is in polychromatic brick with a roof in purple slate with grey bands. It consists of a nave with a south porch, an apsidal chancel with a conical roof, and a north vestry. On the roof is a wooden lantern with a short spire. The west window has two lights, and the other windows are lancets. The porch has a blue brick archway with a wooden head pierced by small quatrefoils.
School; 54.13657°N 1.48008°W		1876	The school is in polychromatic brick and has a roof in purple slate with grey bands. There is a single storey and an L-shaped plan, each range with two bays. The porch has a gabled roof, and the windows are sashes with cambered heads and moulded brick surrounds. On the roof are three gabled ventilators with louvred fronts.
Wall and gates to church and school 54.13668°N 1.47944°W		1876	The wall forming the boundary to the church and school is in bands of red and blue brick with gabled stone coping. The church gate piers are in sandstone, the main columns are chamfered, and they have pyramidal caps. The gates are wooden, with trefoil open panels, and wrought iron crosses and an overthrow. The school gate piers are in brick with moulded stone caps.
Clock tower 54.13645°N 1.48012°W		1893	The clock tower is in bands of red and blue brick, and it has a lead roof. There are three stages, each face of each stage with a recessed panel. In the lowest stage is a doorway and a two-light window with a cambered head, and the middle stage has a stepped dentilled cornice. The top stage is corbelled, and on each side is a clock face. The roof is pyramidal, and has gablets with louvres, a spire and a weathervane.
