= Holy Innocents Church, Copt Hewick =

Church in Copt Hewick, North Yorkshire, England

Coordinates: 54°08′12″N 1°28′47″W

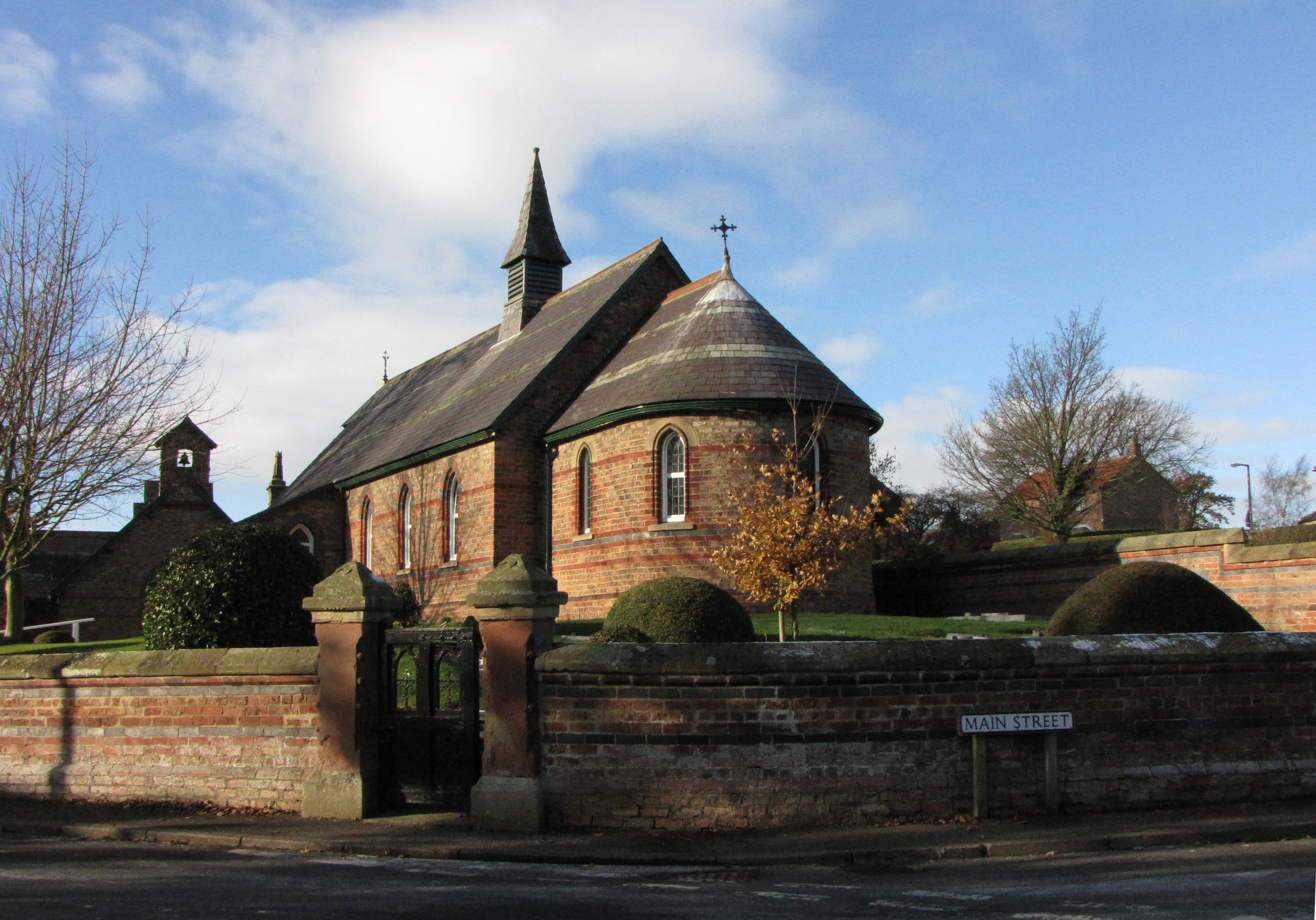
The building, in 2010

Holy Innocents Church is an Anglican church in Copt Hewick, a village in North Yorkshire, in England.

Anglican worship in Copt Hewick began in the mid-19th century, in a schoolroom. In 1876, a church was constructed, to a design by W. Lewis and Robert Hargreave Brodrick. It was consecrated by the Bishop of Ripon on 2 August. In 1887, it was dedicated to the Holy Innocents, and that year, the nave was extended, a vestry added, and the roof was replaced. In 1960, new altar rails and a reading desk were installed, and the following year, stained glass was placed in the windows. The church was Grade II listed in 1986.

The church is built of polychromatic brick, with a roof in purple slate with grey bands. It consists of a nave with a south porch, an apsidal chancel with a conical roof, and a north vestry. On the roof is a wooden lantern with a short spire. The west window has two lights, and the other windows are lancets. The porch has a blue brick archway with a wooden head pierced by small quatrefoils. Inside, there are many polychromatic tiles, and there is a chancel screen which can slide into the side walls.

== See also ==
- Listed buildings in Copt Hewick
