= Robert Hargreave Brodrick =

Australian architect (1860–1934)

Robert Hargreave Brodrick (3 July 1860 – 19 September 1934) was an architect from England who spent most of his life in Australia as City Architect for Sydney.

He was born in Macclesfield, Cheshire, the son of Robert Brodrick, a silk manufacturer. His apprenticeship was served at the practice of James Fraser, of Leeds.

He was initially in partnership with W. Lewis, trading as Lewis and Brodrick of Thirsk and Ripon, but this partnership was dissolved in 1877.

He undertook a number of commissions in England, until aged 22 he moved to Australia. In 1883 he got a job as a draftsman in the City Architect's Department of Sydney Municipal Council. Within 12 years he was City Architect.

He married Emily Jane Maher on 20 May 1896 at All Saints' Church, Petersham. They had five children, four daughters and a son.

== List of works ==
- Holy Innocents Church, Copt Hewick and Sunday school 1876
- St Michael and All Angels' Church, Littlethorpe 1878
- St John's Almshouses, Ripon 1878
- Congregational School and Ministers House, Ripon 1881
