= St John's Almshouses, Ripon =

Grade II listed building in North Yorkshire, England

St John’s Almshouses, Ripon
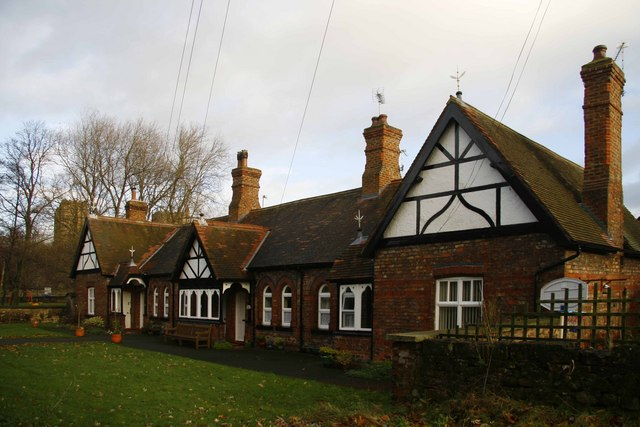

- Location within North Yorkshire
- 54°07′58.77″N 1°31′14.31″W
- Location: Ripon, North Yorkshire, England

History
- Built: 1878

Site notes
- Architect: Robert Hargreave Brodrick

Listed Building – Grade II
- Official name: Hospital of St John the Baptist
- Designated: 19 March 1984

St John’s Almshouses (formally the Hospital of St John the Baptist) are Grade II listed Almshouses in Ripon, North Yorkshire, England.

== History ==
The hospital was founded by the Archbishop of York Thomas in the early 12th century.

In 1544-5 King Henry VIII allowed the Archbishop of York to take over responsibility for the hospital and appoint the masters.

Originally governed by an independent Master, the Mastership was transferred to the Dean of Ripon in 1688.

The current almshouses were built in 1878 to the designs of the architect Robert Hargreave Brodrick.

== See also ==
- Listed buildings in Ripon
