= Listed buildings in Stirton with Thorlby =

Stirton with Thorlby is a civil parish in the county of North Yorkshire, England. It contains 35 listed buildings that are recorded in the National Heritage List for England. All the listed buildings are designated at Grade II, the lowest of the three grades, which is applied to "buildings of national importance and special interest". The parish contains the settlements of Stirton and Thorlby, and the surrounding countryside. A significant number of the listed buildings are boundary stones, and the others include houses, farmhouses and farm buildings, a set of stocks, two milestones, a bridge, an aqueduct and tunnel, and a guidepost.

== Buildings ==
Name and location	Photograph	Date	Notes
Store west of Stirton House; 53.97009°N 2.04430°W		Mid 17th century (possible)	A granary later used for other purposes, it is in stone with a stone slate roof. There are two storeys and one bay. On the front is a doorway with a plain surround, and on the right return are external steps leading to an upper floor doorway, to the right of which is a small round-headed window with a chamfered surround. At the rear is a blocked window.
Tithe Barn; 53.96882°N 2.04495°W	—	17th century	The tithe barn, later converted for residential use, probably has an earlier roof structure. It is in stone with a stone slate roof, and consists of a single cell with five bays. On the west front is a cart entrance, on the east front is a central doorway, and on both fronts are ventilation slots. The south gable end contains a square pitching opening.
Stirton House; 53.97022°N 2.04415°W		1668	The farmhouse is in stone with a stone slate roof, the left gable coped and with a kneeler. There are two storeys, three bays, a continuous rear outshut, and the gable end faces the street. On the front is a gabled porch with a chamfered surround and shaped kneelers. The inner entrance has a moulded surround and a dated and initialled Tudor arched lintel, and to the left is a blocked entrance. The windows are casements, one with a chamfered surround, and there are traces of blocked 17th-century windows. Inside, there is a massive inglenook fireplace.
Ivy Cottage; 53.96919°N 2.04427°W		1673	The house is in stone, and has a stone slate roof with shaped kneelers. There are two storeys and three bays. The doorway has a round arch of voussoirs, a moulded surround, and projecting moulded imposts. Above it is a hood mould enclosing an initialled datestone. To the left of the doorway is a transomed fire window with a chamfered surround, above which is a single-light window. The other windows are mullioned and transomed with casements.
Barn north of Stirton House; 53.97031°N 2.04434°W		1673	The barn is in stone, with sandstone dressings, and a stone slate roof with coped gables and shaped kneelers. There are two storeys and two bays. In the centre is a wagon entrance with a chamfered surround, a basket arch of voussoirs, and a dated and initialled keystone. Above the entrance is a slate roof on corbels. To the left is a doorway converted into a window, and there are windows in the upper floor on the right, and on the left return.
Boundary stone at NGR SD 9468 5435; 53.97718°N 2.08258°W	—	1698	The boundary stone is in millstone grit, and is about 65 centimetres (26 in) in height. It is inscribed "T" on the east side, "ST" on the west side and "11" on the top.
Boundary stone at NGR SD 9470 5338; 53.97645°N 2.08225°W	—	1698	The boundary stone is in millstone grit, and is about 67 centimetres (26 in) in height. It is inscribed "T" on the east side, "ST" on the west side and "2" on the top.
Boundary stone at NGR SD 9470 5337; 53.97626°N 2.08219°W	—	1698	The boundary stone is in millstone grit, and is about 70 centimetres (28 in) in height. It is inscribed "T" on the east side, "ST" on the west side and "3" on the top.
Boundary stone at NGR SD 9472 5330; 53.97581°N 2.08187°W	—	1698	The boundary stone is in millstone grit, and is about 75 centimetres (30 in) in height. It is inscribed "T" on the east side, "ST" on the west side and "5" on the top.
Boundary stone at NGR SD 9480 5299; 53.97294°N 2.08065°W	—	1698	The boundary stone is in millstone grit, and is about 72 centimetres (28 in) in height. It is inscribed "T" on the east side, "ST" on the west side and "7" on the top.
Boundary stone at NGR SD 9490 5298; 53.97281°N 2.07905°W	—	1698	The boundary stone is in millstone grit, and is about 70 centimetres (28 in) in height. It is inscribed "T" on the east side, "ST" on the west side and "8" on the top.
Boundary stone at NGR SD 9497 5299; 53.97273°N 2.07804°W	—	1698	The boundary stone is in millstone grit, and is about 70 centimetres (28 in) in height. It is inscribed "T" on the east side, "ST" on the west side and "9"(?) on the top.
Boundary stone at NGR SD 9501 5297; 53.97272°N 2.07767°W	—	1698	The boundary stone is in millstone grit, and is about 70 centimetres (28 in) in height. It is inscribed "T" on the east side, "ST" on the west side and "1"(0) on the top.
Boundary stone at NGR SD 9502 5292; 53.97232°N 2.07737°W	—	1698	The boundary stone is in millstone grit, and is about 70 centimetres (28 in) in height. It is inscribed "T" on the east side, "ST" on the west side and "11"(?) on the top.
Boundary stone at NGR SD 9505 5291; 53.97221°N 2.07704°W	—	1698	The boundary stone is in millstone grit, and is about 75 centimetres (30 in) in height. It is inscribed "T" on the east side, "ST" on the west side and "12"(?) on the top.
Boundary stone at NGR SD 9506 5265; 53.96984°N 2.076634°W	—	1698	The boundary stone is in millstone grit, and is about 45 centimetres (18 in) in height. It is inscribed "T" on the east side, "ST" on the west side and "13"(?) on the top.
Boundary stone at NGR SD 9517 5236; 53.96730°N 2.075114°W	—	1698	The boundary stone is in millstone grit, and is about 75 centimetres (30 in) in height. It is inscribed "T" on the east side, "ST" on the west side and "23" on the top.
Boundary stone at NGR SD 9532 5241; 53.96770°N 2.07238°W	—	1698	The boundary stone is in millstone grit, and is about 38 centimetres (15 in) in height. It is inscribed "T" on the north side, "ST" on the south side and "25" on the top.
Boundary stone at NGR SD 9553 5235; 53.96705°N 2.06924°W	—	1698	The boundary stone is in millstone grit, and is about 30 centimetres (12 in) in height. It is inscribed "T" on the north side, "ST" on the south side.
Boundary stone at NGR SD 9588 5218; 53.96563°N 2.06443°W	—	1698	The boundary stone is in millstone grit, and is about 80 centimetres (31 in) in height. It is inscribed "T" on the northeast side, "ST" on the southest side and "36" on the top.
Stocks; 53.9715067°N 2.04505°W		Early 18th century (probable)	The stocks are in millstone grit, and consist of two posts, the left about 60 centimetres (24 in) in height and broken, and the right, about 90 centimetres (35 in) in height, with a rectangular section and a mortice on the inner side. The base rail contains four recesses for legs.
Milestone, White Hills Lane; 53.97125°N 2.03438°W		Mid 18th century (probable)	The milestone on the north side of White Hills Lane is in millstone grit. It has a rectangular section and a rounded top, and is about 60 centimetres (24 in) in height. The left side is inscribed "1" and the right side "15".
Stirton Croft; 53.96967°N 2.04428°W	—	Mid to late 18th century	The house is in limestone with sandstone dressings, and a hipped stone slate roof. There are two storeys and two bays, a cellar, and a rear wing with two storeys and two bays. On the centre of the front is a gabled porch and a doorway with a plain surround, and the windows are mullioned with two lights. On the rear wing is a doorway with a plain surround and three-light mullioned windows.
Thorlby House; 53.97528°N 2.04001°W	—	Mid to late 18th century	A large house in rendered roughcast stone, with sandstone dressings, quoins, a sill band, a projecting modillion cornice, and a slate roof. There are two storeys, three bays, and a later entrance block. On the entrance front is a Greek Doric portico with a pulvinated frieze, a modillion pediment, and a doorway with a fanlight and a dentilled lintel. On the ground floor is a French window and casement windows, and the upper floor has sash windows. The left return has a two-storey bow window, two engaged pilasters, and two Ionic columns in antis.
Inghey Bridge; 53.96103°N 2.06051°W		1772–73	The bridge carries a former road over the River Aire, it incorporates earlier material, and has since been widened. It is in stone, and consists of two segmental arches over the river and one over land. The main arch has recessed voussoirs and a curved hood mould, and the other arches have flush voussoirs. There are four cutwaters on each side, the parapets are coped, and they end in conical bollards.
Tunnel under the Leeds and Liverpool Canal; 53.96192°N 2.05541°W		1774	An aqueduct carries the canal over a tunnel through which passes a track, and it was designed by James Brindley. The tunnel is in stone, and passes at an obtuse angle under the canal. It has projecting impost blocks and voussoirs to the basket arch, and the retaining walls have a string course and coping.
Bay Horse Farmhouse; 53.97153°N 2.05479°W	—	Late 18th century	An inn, later a farmhouse, in stone with a stone slate roof. There are two storeys and two bays, and a single-bay extension to the left. On the front is a doorway with a plain surround and a moulded hood, and to the right is a doorway with a thin chamfered surround. The windows in the original part are mullioned, and those in the extension are sashes.
Manor Farm Cottage; 53.97095°N 2.05187°W	—	1782	A farmhouse, later a private house, it is in stone with a stone slate roof. There are two storeys and two bays, and a later single-storey extension on the left. The central doorway has a chamfered surround, a basket-arch, and an initialled and dated lintel, and the windows in the main part are mullioned. The extension has a doorway and casement windows with plain surrounds.
White House Farmhouse; 53.97186°N 2.04219°W	—	c. 1790	The farmhouse is in stone with a stone slate roof. There are two storeys and four bays. The central doorway has a plain surround, and the windows are mullioned, and contain casements and fixed lights.
Owlet House; 53.99053°N 2.03989°W	—	c. 1830	The farmhouse is in sandstone with eaves modillions and a stone slate roof. There are two storeys and four bays. On the front is a Tuscan porch, and the doorway has a plain surround. There are two blind windows, and the others are sashes. To the left is a single-bay barn.
Aireville Grange; 53.96516°N 2.03797°W	—	1835	A coachman's lodge, later a private house, it is in stone with a stone slate roof. There are two storeys and three bays, the gable end facing the road. The middle bay projects and is gabled with a ball finial. This bay contains a doorway, and above it is a round-arched window. The other windows are mullioned, those in the ground floor with moulded surrounds. On the chimney stack facing the road is an initialled datestone.
Aireville Lodge; 53.96434°N 2.03654°W		c. 1836	Originally the lodge to Aireville Hall, it is in stone with a steep Welsh slate roof, and gables with carved and shaped bargeboards. There is one storey and three bays, the middle bay projecting and gabled. The middle bay contains a doorway with a Tudor arch, above which is a shield of arms. The flanking windows are mullioned with two lights, and on the left return, facing the road, is an oriel window.
Guidepost; 53.98337°N 2.03478°W		Mid-19th century	The guidepost at the junction of Bog Lane and Grassington Road (B6265 road) is in millstone grit. It has a triangular plan and a pointed top, and is about 1 metre (3 ft 3 in) in height. On the south face is inscribed "STIRTON" and "GARGRAVE", and on the north face "CRACOE" and "THRESHFIELD".
Boundary stone on south side of Inghey Bridge; 53.96090°N 2.06153°W		Mid to late 19th century	The boundary stone is a painted sandstone slab about 45 centimetres (18 in) in height, with two round arches divided by a scored vertical line. The left side is inscribed "E S STIRTON WITH THORLBY" and the right side with "H D BROUGHTON".
Milestone, Grassington Road; 53.98637°N 2.03623°W		1870s	The milestone on the east side of Grassington Road (B6265 road) is in millstone grit with a cast iron plate. It has a triangular plan and a rounded head. On the top is inscribed " SKIPTON AND CRACOE ROAD" and "STIRTON WITH THORLBY", on the left side is the distance to Skipton, and on the right side to Cracoe.
