= List of boundary changes in Yorkshire and the Humber =

Map of Yorkshire and the Humber

This is a list of boundary changes occurring in the Yorkshire and the Humber region of England, since the re-organisation of local government following the passing of the Local Government Act 1972.

== Administrative boundaries ==
=== Initial creation ===
When the Local Government Act 1972 was passed there were still some details left to be decided, the Local Government Boundary Commission for England's first work was to clarify these details.

Date	Statutory Instrument	LGBCE Report
1 February 1973	The English Non-Metropolitan Districts (Definition) Order 1972	Report No. 001: Recommendations for new Districts in the non-Metropolitan Counties November 1972
1 May 1973	The English Non-Metropolitan Districts (Names) Order 1973	Report No. 002: Names of Non-Metropolitan Districts March 1973
1 April 1973	The Metropolitan Districts (Names) Order 1973	n/a

=== Principal Area Boundary Reviews ===
The Local Government Boundary Commission for England (or LGBCE) was established by the Local Government Act 1972 to review the administrative boundaries of every local authority in England. Between 1974 and 1992 they completed a series of Principal Area Boundary Reviews; reviewing the administrative boundaries of local authorities at their request.

Date	Statutory Instrument	Effect	LGBCE Report(s)
1 April 1976	The Glanford and Scunthorpe (Areas) Order 1976	Changes to the Glanford/Scunthorpe (both Humberside) boundary	Report No. 032: Appleby/Frodingham Steelworks (Glanford/Scunthorpe) July 1975
1 April 1983	The North Yorkshire and West Yorkshire (Areas) Order 1982	Changes to the Bradford (West Yorkshire)/Craven (North Yorkshire) boundary	Report No. 415: Craven/Bradford July 1981
1 April 1985	The Humberside and North Yorkshire (Areas) Order 1984	Changes to the: Boothferry (Humberside)/Selby (North Yorkshire) boundary; Boothferry/East Yorkshire Borough of Beverley (both Humberside) boundary	Report No. 454: Boothferry/Beverley/Selby August 1983

=== Mandatory Reviews of non-Metropolitan Counties, Metropolitan Districts and London Boroughs ===
In 1985 they began the first full administrative review of all non-metropolitan counties. Their reviews of metropolitan counties and Greater London began in 1987 and both reviews were completed in 1992.

Date	Statutory Instrument	Effect	LGBCE Report(s)
1 April 1990	The Cumbria, Northumberland and North Yorkshire (County Boundaries) Order 1989	Changes to the: Carlisle (Cumbria)/Tynedale (Northumberland) boundary; Eden (Cumbria)/Richmondshire (North Yorkshire) boundary	Report No. 557: Cumbria July 1988
1 April 1991	The Durham and North Yorkshire (County Boundaries) Order 1991	Changes to the: Teesdale (Durham)/Richmondshire (North Yorkshire) boundary; Darlington (Durham)/Richmondshire (North Yorkshire) boundary; Darlington (Durham)/Hambleton (North Yorkshire) boundary	Report No. 569: North Yorkshire December 1988
1 April 1992	The North Yorkshire and West Yorkshire (County and District Boundaries) Order 1991	Changes to the: Craven (North Yorkshire)/Bradford (West Yorkshire) boundary; Harrogate (North Yorkshire)/Bradford (West Yorkshire) boundary; Bradford/Leeds (both West Yorkshire) boundary; Bradford/Calderdale (both West Yorkshire) boundary	Report No. 586: Bradford April 1990
1 April 1991	The North Yorkshire, South Yorkshire and Nottinghamshire (County Boundaries) Order 1991	Changes to the: Selby (North Yorkshire)/Doncaster (South Yorkshire) boundary; Doncaster (South Yorkshire)/Bassetlaw (Nottinghamshire) boundary	Report No. 585: Doncaster March 1990
1 April 1993	The Greater Manchester and West Yorkshire (County and District Boundaries) Order 1992	Changes to the: Oldham (Greater Manchester)/Kirklees (West Yorkshire) boundary; Oldham/Rochdale (both Greater Manchester) boundary; Oldham/Manchester (both Greater Manchester) boundary; Oldham/Tameside (both Greater Manchester) boundary	Report No. 611: Oldham October 1991
1 April 1993	The North Yorkshire and West Yorkshire (County Boundaries) Order 1992	Changes to the: Harrogate (North Yorkshire)/Leeds (West Yorkshire) boundary; Selby (North Yorkshire)/Leeds (West Yorkshire) boundary	Report No. 606: Leeds September 1991
1 April 1993	The North, South and West Yorkshire (County and District Boundaries) Order 1992	Changes to the: Selby (North Yorkshire)/Wakefield (West Yorkshire) boundary; Barnsley (South Yorkshire)/Kirklees (West Yorkshire) boundary; Barnsley (South Yorkshire)/Wakefield (West Yorkshire) boundary; Doncaster (South Yorkshire)/Wakefield (West Yorkshire) boundary; Barnsley/Doncaster (both South Yorkshire) boundary; Barnsley/Rotherham (both South Yorkshire) boundary; Kirklees/Wakefield (both West Yorkshire) boundary; Leeds/Wakefield (both West Yorkshire) boundary	Report No. 600: Wakefield February 1991
1 April 1994	The Bradford, Kirklees and Leeds (City and Metropolitan Borough Boundaries) Order 1993	Changes to the: Bradford/Kirklees (both West Yorkshire) boundary; Kirklees/Leeds (both West Yorkshire) boundary	Report No. 659: Kirklees June 1992
1 April 1994	The Calderdale and Kirklees (Metropolitan Borough Boundaries) Order 1993	Changes to the Calderdale/Kirklees (both West Yorkshire) boundary	Report No. 630: Calderdale March 1992
1 April 1994	The Derbyshire and South Yorkshire (County and District Boundaries) Order 1993	Changes to the: North East Derbyshire (Derbyshire)/Sheffield (South Yorkshire) boundary; Barnsley/Sheffield (both South Yorkshire) boundary	Report No. 614: Sheffield September 1991
1 April 1994	The Derbyshire, Nottinghamshire and South Yorkshire (County and District Boundaries) Order 1993	Changes to the: Bolsover (Derbyshire)/Rotherham (South Yorkshire) boundary; North East Derbyshire (Derbyshire)/Rotherham (South Yorkshire) boundary; Bassetlaw (Nottinghamshire)/Rotherham (South Yorkshire) boundary; Doncaster/Rotherham (both South Yorkshire) boundary; Rotherham/Sheffield (both South Yorkshire) boundary	Report No. 670: Rotherham August 1992
1 April 1994	The Humberside and South Yorkshire (County Boundaries) Order 1993	Changes to the Boothferry (Humberside)/Doncaster (South Yorkshire) boundary	Report No. 650: Doncaster June 1992

Other mandatory meviews of non-metropolitan counties, metropolitan districts and London boroughs

- Report No. 563: Humberside September 1988
- Report No. 601: Barnsley February 1991
- Report No. 604: Humberside (Further Review) July 1991
- Report No. 607: North Yorkshire (Further Review) August 1991

== Electoral boundaries ==
=== Initial creation ===
When the Local Government Act 1972 was passed there was not sufficient time to draw up proper electoral boundaries for the new county and district councils, so a temporary system was quickly put in place, intended to only be used for the first elections in 1973.

Date	Statutory Instrument
7 June 1973	The County of Humberside (District Wards) Order 1973
12 April 1973	The County of Humberside (Electoral Divisions) Order 1973
7 June 1973	The County of North Yorkshire (District Wards) Order 1973
12 April 1973	The County of North Yorkshire (Electoral Divisions) Order 1973
12 April 1973 & 10 May 1973	The County of South Yorkshire (Electoral Divisions and Wards) Order 1973
12 April 1973 & 10 May 1973	The County of West Yorkshire (Electoral Divisions and Wards) Order 1973

=== First periodic review ===
The Local Government Boundary Commission for England (or LGBCE) was established by the Local Government Act 1972 to review the electoral boundaries of every local authority in England. In 1974 they began the first full electoral review of all metropolitan and non-metropolitan districts, completing it in July 1980. Their reviews of the county councils were completed in 1984.

Date	Statutory Instrument	LGBCE Report
6 May 1976	The Borough of North Wolds (Electoral Arrangements) Order 1975	Report No. 036: North Wolds August 1975
6 May 1976	The District of Boothferry (Electoral Arrangements) Order 1975	Report No. 065: Boothferry October 1975
6 May 1976	The District of Holderness (Electoral Arrangements) Order 1975	Report No. 027: Holderness June 1975
3 May 1979	The Borough of Beverley (Electoral Arrangements) Order 1976	Report No. 119: Beverley November 1975
3 May 1979	The Borough of Cleethorpes (Electoral Arrangements) Order 1976	Report No. 127: Cleethorpes December 1975
3 May 1979	The Borough of Glanford (Electoral Arrangements) Order 1976	Report No. 128: Glanford January 1976
3 May 1979	The Borough of Scunthorpe (Electoral Arrangements) Order 1976	Report No. 109: Scunthorpe November 1975
3 May 1979	The City of York (Electoral Arrangements) Order 1976	Report No. 166: City of York September 1976
3 May 1979	The Borough of Scarborough (Electoral Arrangements) Order 1977	Report No. 182: Scarborough February 1977
3 May 1979	The District of Craven (Electoral Arrangements) Order 1977	Report No. 174: Craven November 1976
3 May 1979	The District of Richmondshire (Electoral Arrangements) Order 1977	Report No. 222: Richmondshire July 1977
3 May 1979	The Borough of Barnsley (Electoral Arrangements) Order 1978	Report No. 264: Barnsley November 1977
3 May 1979	The Borough of Grimsby (Electoral Arrangements) Order 1978	Report No. 288: Grimsby August 1978
3 May 1979	The District of Hambleton (Electoral Arrangements) Order 1978	Report No. 293: Hambleton September 1978
3 May 1979	The District of Selby (Electoral Arrangements) Order 1978	Report No. 228: Selby July 1977
1 May 1980	The Borough of Calderdale (Electoral Arrangements) Order 1979	Report No. 308: Calderdale October 1978
1 May 1980	The Borough of Doncaster (Electoral Arrangements) Order 1979	Report No. 284: Doncaster August 1978
5 May 1983	The Borough of Harrogate (Electoral Arrangements) Order 1979	Report No. 312: Harrogate December 1978
1 May 1980	The Borough of Rotherham (Electoral Arrangements) Order 1979	Report No. 306: Rotherham October 1978
1 May 1980	The City of Bradford (Electoral Arrangements) Order 1979	Report No. 337: Bradford June 1979
5 May 1983	The City of Kingston upon Hull (Electoral Arrangements) Order 1979	Report No. 318: Kingston-upon-Hull January 1979
1 May 1980	The City of Leeds (Electoral Arrangements) Order 1979	Report No. 346: Leeds August 1979
1 May 1980	The City of Sheffield (Electoral Arrangements) Order 1979	Report No. 345: Sheffield July 1979
5 May 1983	The District of Ryedale (Electoral Arrangements) Order 1979	Report No. 320: Ryedale February 1979
6 May 1982	The Borough of Kirklees (Electoral Arrangements) Order 1980	Report No. 344: Kirklees July 1979
6 May 1982	The City of Wakefield (Electoral Arrangements) Order 1980	Report No. 349: Wakefield September 1979
7 May 1981	The County of Humberside (Electoral Arrangements) Order 1981	Report No. 407: Humberside December 1980
2 May 1985	The County of North Yorkshire (Electoral Arrangements) Order 1985	Report No. 477: North Yorkshire August 1984
1 November 1985	The County of West Yorkshire (Electoral Arrangements) Order 1985	Report No. 483: West Yorkshire October 1984

=== Second periodic review ===
The Local Government Act 1992 established the Local Government Commission for England (or LGCE) as the successor to the LGBCE. In 1996 they began the second full electoral review of English local authorities. On 1 April 2002 the Boundary Committee for England (or BCfE) took over the functions of the LGBCE and carried on the review, completing it in 2004.

Date	Statutory Instrument	LGCE/BCfE Report(s)
2 May 2002	The Borough of Harrogate (Electoral Changes) Order 2000	Draft report 25 May 1999 Final report 30 November 1999
1 May 2003	The Borough of Scarborough (Electoral Changes) Order 2000	Draft report 25 May 1999 Final report 30 November 1999
2 May 2002	The District of Craven (Electoral Changes) Order 2000; The District of Craven (Electoral Changes) (Amendment) Order 2005	Draft report 25 May 1999 Final report 30 November 1999
1 May 2003	The District of Hambleton (Electoral Changes) Order 2000	Draft report 25 May 1999 Final report 30 November 1999
1 May 2003	The District of Richmondshire (Electoral Changes) Order 2000	Draft report 25 May 1999 Final report 30 November 1999
1 May 2003	The District of Ryedale (Electoral Changes) Order 2000	Draft report 25 May 1999 Final report 30 November 1999
1 May 2003	The District of Selby (Electoral Changes) Order 2000	Draft report 25 May 1999 Final report 30 November 1999
1 May 2003	The Borough of North East Lincolnshire (Electoral Changes) Order 2001	Draft report 12 December 2000 Final report 15 May 2001
1 May 2003	The Borough of North Lincolnshire (Electoral Changes) Order 2001	Draft report 12 December 2000 Final report 15 May 2001
2 May 2002	The City of Kingston upon Hull (Electoral Changes) Order 2001	Draft report 12 December 2000 Final report 15 May 2001
1 May 2003	The City of York (Electoral Changes) Order 2001	Draft report 12 December 2000 Final report 15 May 2001
1 May 2003	The District of East Riding (Electoral Changes) Order 2001; The District of East Riding (Electoral Changes) (Amendment) Order 2002	Draft report 12 December 2000 Final report 15 May 2001
10 June 2004	The Borough of Barnsley (Electoral Changes) Order 2003; The Borough of Barnsley (Electoral Changes) (Amendment) Order 2004	Draft report 11 February 2003 Final report 29 July 2003
10 June 2004	The Borough of Calderdale (Electoral Changes) Order 2003	Draft report 11 February 2003 Final report 29 July 2003
10 June 2004	The Borough of Kirklees (Electoral Changes) Order 2003	Draft report 11 February 2003 Final report 29 July 2003
10 June 2004	The City of Leeds (Electoral Changes) Order 2003	Draft report 11 February 2003 Final report 29 July 2003
10 June 2004	The City of Wakefield (Electoral Changes) Order 2003	Draft report 11 February 2003 Final report 29 July 2003
10 June 2004	The Borough of Doncaster (Electoral Changes) Order 2004	Draft report 11 February 2003 Final report 27 August 2003
10 June 2004	The Borough of Rotherham (Electoral Changes) Order 2004	Draft report 11 February 2003 Final report 27 August 2003
10 June 2004	The City of Bradford (Electoral Changes) Order 2004	Draft report 11 February 2003 Final report 29 July 2003
10 June 2004	The City of Sheffield (Electoral Changes) Order 2004	Draft report 11 February 2003 Final report 29 July 2003
5 May 2005	The County of North Yorkshire (Electoral Changes) Order 2005	Draft report 28 May 2004 Draft report (reissue) 2 June 2004; Final report 12 October 2004

=== Further electoral reviews by the BCfE ===
Date	Statutory Instrument	BCfE Report(s)
1 May 2008	The Bradford (Electoral Changes) Order 2008	

=== Further electoral reviews by the LGBCE ===
The Local Government Boundary Commission for England (or LGBCE) was established by the Local Democracy, Economic Development and Construction Act 2009 on 1 April 2010 as the successor to the BCfE. It continues to review the electoral arrangements of English local authorities on an ‘as and when’ basis.

Date	Statutory Instrument	LGBCE Report(s)
7 May 2015	The Hambleton (Electoral Changes) Order 2014	Final report March 2013
7 May 2015	The Selby (Electoral Changes) Order 2014	Final report January 2014
7 May 2015	The York (Electoral Changes) Order 2014	Final report July 2014
7 May 2015	The Doncaster (Electoral Changes) Order 2015	Final report November 2014
5 May 2016	The Sheffield (Electoral Changes) Order 2015	Final report March 2015
3 May 2018	The Harrogate (Electoral Changes) Order 2017	Final report December 2016
3 May 2018	The Kingston upon Hull (Electoral Changes) Order 2017	Final report October 2017
3 May 2018	The Leeds (Electoral Changes) Order 2017	Final report March 2017
2 May 2019	The Richmondshire (Electoral Changes) Order 2018	Final report April 2018
2 May 2019	The Scarborough (Electoral Changes) Order 2018	Final report April 2018
6 May 2021	The Rotherham (Electoral Changes) Order 2020	Final report October 2017
4 May 2023	The North Lincolnshire (Electoral Changes) Order 2022	Final report March 2022
7 May 2026	The Barnsley (Electoral Changes) Order 2025	Final report December 2024
7 May 2026	The Bradford (Electoral Changes) Order 2025	Final report December 2024
7 May 2026	The Calderdale (Electoral Changes) Order 2024	Final report May 2024
7 May 2026	The Kirklees (Electoral Changes) Order 2025	Final report December 2024
7 May 2026	The Wakefield (Electoral Changes) Order 2025	Final report December 2024

=== Changes resulting from parish council boundary changes ===
These orders were made to subsequent to changes to civil parish boundaries.

Date	Statutory Instrument	Cause
1 May 2008	The Bradford (Electoral Changes) Order 2008	Transfer of areas between Denholme and Oxenhope
5 May 2011	The Rotherham (Electoral Changes) Order 2011	Transfer of areas from Dinnington St. John's to Woodsetts
2 May 2013; 22 May 2014; 5 May 2016	The District of Craven (Electoral Changes) Order 2012; The District of Craven (Electoral Changes) (Amendment) Order 2013	Transfers of areas between the following parishes: Carleton-in-Craven to Lothersdale; Cowling to Lothersdale; Giggleswick to Settle; Glusburn and Cross Hills to Cononley; Glusburn and Cross Hills to Kildwick; Glusburn and Cross Hills to Lothersdale; Glusburn and Cross Hills to Sutton-in-Craven; Hartlington to Appletreewick; Kildwick to Glusburn and Cross Hills; Long Preston to Settle; Linton to Cracoe; Settle to Giggleswick; Skipton to Draughton; Skipton to Embsay with Eastby; Skipton to Stirton with Thorlby; Stirton with Thorlby to Skipton; Sutton-in-Craven to Cowling; Sutton-in-Craven to Glusburn and Cross Hills

== Structural changes ==
Date	Statutory Instrument	LGCE Report(s)
1 April 1996	The Humberside (Structural Change) Order 1995	
1 April 1996	The North Yorkshire (District of York) (Structural and Boundary Changes) Order 1995	
1 April 2023	The North Yorkshire (Structural Changes) Order 2022	

Other structural reviews

- Humber to the Wash - Draft report June 1993
- North of the Humber - Draft report June 1993
- A report on the 1992-1995 Structural Review May 1995
- Overview report of 21 Districts in England September 1995
