= Listed buildings in Givendale =

Givendale is a civil parish in the county of North Yorkshire, England. It contains two listed buildings that are recorded in the National Heritage List for England. Both the listed buildings are designated at Grade II, the lowest of the three grades, which is applied to "buildings of national importance and special interest". The parish contains part of the grounds of Newby Hall, and the listed buildings are a lodge at the entrance to the grounds, and associated structures.

== Buildings ==
Name and location	Photograph	Date	Notes
Lodge to Newby Hall; 54.10991°N 1.47473°W	—	Early 19th century	The lodge at the entrance to the grounds is in stone with an eaves band, a modillion eaves cornice and a hipped grey slate roof. There is one storey and two bays, the right bay projecting slightly. On the front are two sash windows, the doorway is in the left return, and each of the openings has a plain cornice on brackets.
Gates, gate piers and walls, Lodge to Newby Hall; 54.11002°N 1.47460°W		Early 19th century	The gate piers flanking the entrance to the drive are in rusticated gritstone with modillion cornices and dragon crests, and between them are double wrought iron gates. The walls outside these are ramped down to two pairs of smaller, similar piers with lion crests. The wall continues to the left, with buttresses, and a pair of gates with rusticated piers, the right pier with an eagle crest. The wall to the left incorporates two piers with ball finials, and there is a free-standing limestone wall containing three rusticated piers with ball finials.
