= Hollin Hall, Littlethorpe =

Building in Littlethorpe, North Yorkshire, England

Coordinates: 54.1006°N 1.5226°W

Hollin Hall is a historic building in Littlethorpe, North Yorkshire, a village in England.

The building was constructed in the late 17th century, probably for William Thomson, replacing an earlier building. It was originally named Hollin Close Hall. It was altered in about 1811, at which time it was owned by Richard Wood, who shortened its name to "Hollin Hall". The building was grade II* listed in 1967.

The main ranges of the house are constructed of stuccoed and painted red brick, with stone dressings, quoins, and stone slate roofs, and the outbuildings in brick and stone with pantile roofs. The plan is complicated, and consists of a main range with two storeys and an L-shaped plan, with an entrance front of five bays, and a south front of six bays, a two-storey L-shaped service wing to the north, and an L-shaped range of outbuildings with one and two storeys further to the north. The middle bay of the entrance front projects under a pediment containing an oeil-de-boeuf, and the outer bays also project. In the centre is a portico with paired Tuscan columns carrying an entablature, a cornice and a blocking course. There is a floor band and a dentilled eaves cornice, and the windows are sashes. Inside, there are some carved wooden fireplaces, elaborate plasterwork, some 17th century panelling, and a hidden staircase leading to an attic room.

== See also ==
- Grade II* listed buildings in North Yorkshire (district)
- Listed buildings in Littlethorpe, North Yorkshire
