= Stirton with Thorlby =

Civil parish in North Yorkshire, England

Coordinates: 53.971°N 2.059°W

- Civil parish
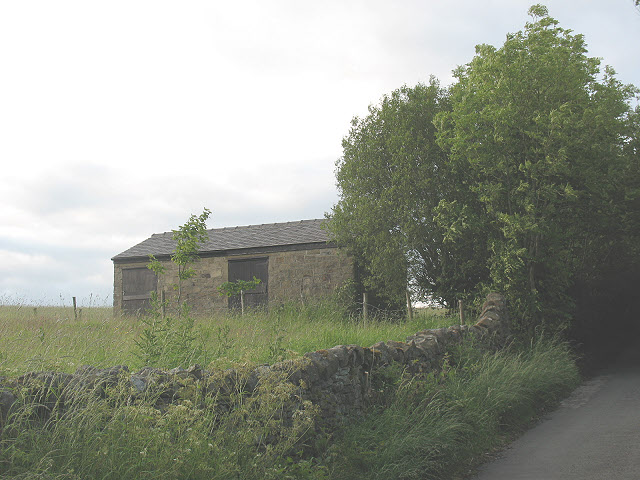
- Barn on Bog Lane, Stirton

- Population: 204 (2011 census)
- OS grid reference: SD961529
- Civil parish: Stirton with Thorlby
- Unitary authority: North Yorkshire
- Ceremonial county: North Yorkshire
- Region: Yorkshire and the Humber
- Country: England
- Sovereign state: United Kingdom
- Post town: SKIPTON
- Postcode district: BD23
- Police: North Yorkshire
- Fire: North Yorkshire
- Ambulance: Yorkshire

Stirton with Thorlby is a civil parish in the county of North Yorkshire, England. The parish includes the settlements of Stirton and Thorlby. The population at the 2011 census was 204, an increase on the 2001 census figure of 173.

== History ==
Stirton with Thorlby was formerly a township in the parish of Skipton, in 1866 Stirton with Thorlby became a civil parish in its own right. On 1 April 1938 7 acres was transferred to Skipton.

Until 1974 it was part of the West Riding of Yorkshire. From 1974 to 2023 it was part of the Craven District, it is now administered by the unitary North Yorkshire Council.

== See also ==
- Listed buildings in Stirton with Thorlby
