= Littlethorpe, North Yorkshire =

Village and civil parish in North Yorkshire, England

Coordinates: 54°07′04″N 1°30′22″W

Littlethorpe
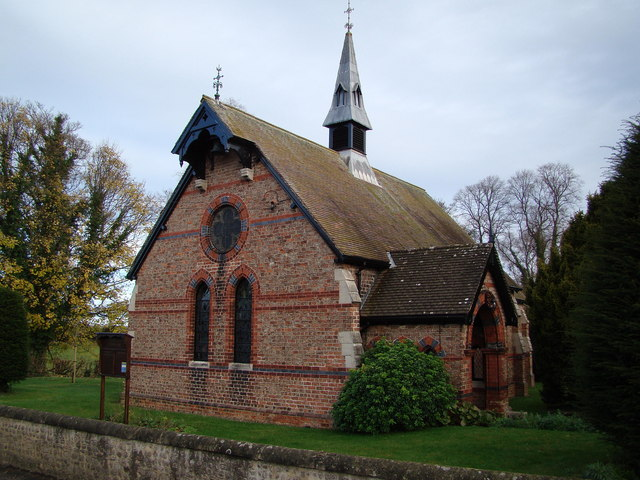
- St Michael and All Angels' Church

- Location within North Yorkshire
- Population: 573 (UK Census 2011)
- OS grid reference: SE3224669346
- Unitary authority: North Yorkshire
- Ceremonial county: North Yorkshire
- Region: Yorkshire and the Humber
- Country: England
- Sovereign state: United Kingdom
- Post town: RIPON
- Postcode district: HG4
- Police: North Yorkshire
- Fire: North Yorkshire
- Ambulance: Yorkshire

Littlethorpe is a village and civil parish in the English county of North Yorkshire, near the city of Ripon.

From 1974 to 2023 it was part of the Borough of Harrogate, it is now administered by the unitary North Yorkshire Council.

Littlethorpe has a place of worship, St Michael and All Angels' Church, built in 1878.

Hollin Hall dates from the late 17th century and is grade II* listed. Thorpe Lodge on the Knaresborough Road is a Grade II listed building.

== See also ==
- Listed buildings in Littlethorpe, North Yorkshire
