= Grade II* listed churches in North Yorkshire (district) =

There are over 20,000 Grade II* listed buildings in England. This page is a list of the 152 churches and chapels in the unitary authority of North Yorkshire listed at Grade II*.

As there are 534 Grade II* listed buildings in the district, the 382 other buildings are instead detailed in the article Grade II* listed buildings in North Yorkshire (district).

Name	Location	Type	Completed (Note: The date given is the date used by Historic England as significant for the initial building or that of an important part in the structure's description.)	Date designated	Grid ref. (Note: The grid reference is based on the British national grid reference system, sometimes known as OSGB36, used by the Ordnance Survey.) Geo-coordinates	Entry number (Note: The "List Entry Number" is a unique number assigned to each listed building and scheduled monument by Historic England.)	Image
Airton Quaker Meeting House, archway and bench	Airton	Friends Meeting House	1694	20 February 1958	SD9031359214; 54°01′44″N 2°08′58″W	1132105	Airton Quaker Meeting House, archway and bench More images
Church of Saint Lawrence	Aldfield	Church	1780s	6 March 1967	SE2658269471; 54°07′14″N 1°35′41″W	1149796	Church of Saint Lawrence More images
Church of Saint John (previously St Mary)	Allerston	Church	14th century	10 January 1953	SE8782982912; 54°14′04″N 0°39′15″W	1149549	Church of Saint John (previously St Mary) More images
Chapel of St Mary attached to the Mansion	Allerton Park, Allerton Mauleverer with Hopperton	Roman Catholic Chapel	c. 1807	18 August 1983	SE4140558064; 54°01′01″N 1°22′11″W	1149995	Upload Photo
Church of St Martin	Allerton Mauleverer	Church	c. 1745	15 March 1966	SE4158457954; 54°00′57″N 1°22′01″W	1149996	Church of St Martin More images
Chapel Range	Aske Park, Aske	Apartment	1887	4 February 1969	NZ1777603442; 54°25′34″N 1°43′39″W	1131346	Upload Photo
Church of Saint Andrew	Aysgarth	Church	10th century	25 March 1969	SE0119588534; 54°17′33″N 1°58′59″W	1318439	Church of Saint Andrew More images
Church of St John the Baptist	Low Bentham, Bentham	Church	15th century	20 February 1958	SD6447369272; 54°07′05″N 2°32′42″W	1157613	Church of St John the Baptist More images
Church of St Mary	Bolton-on-Swale	Church	14th century	4 February 1969	SE2523999168; 54°23′15″N 1°36′46″W	1131521	Church of St Mary More images
Church of St Peter	Brafferton	Church	15th century	17 May 1960	SE4364670152; 54°07′31″N 1°20′01″W	1314926	Church of St Peter More images
Church of All Saints	Brandsby-cum-Stearsby	Church	1767–70	17 May 1960	SE5983871934; 54°08′23″N 1°05′08″W	1150750	Church of All Saints More images
Church of St Paulinus, Presbytery and attached Outbuildings	Brough Park, Brough with St Giles	Priests House	1837	3 July 1987	SE2155298106; 54°22′41″N 1°40′11″W	1179809	Church of St Paulinus, Presbytery and attached Outbuildings More images
Church of St Michael and All Angels	Hubberholme, Buckden	Church	12th century	10 September 1954	SD9261478268; 54°12′00″N 2°06′53″W	1167280	Church of St Michael and All Angels More images
Church of All Saints and churchyard wall and railings	Burton in Lonsdale	Church	1868–76	24 June 1988	SD6511272139; 54°08′38″N 2°32′08″W	1132430	Church of All Saints and churchyard wall and railings More images
Church of St John the Evangelist	Buttercrambe, Buttercrambe with Bossall	Church	c. 1200	29 January 1953	SE7339158108; 54°00′50″N 0°52′53″W	1315747	Church of St John the Evangelist More images
Church of St Mary (Roman Catholic)	Carlton	Roman Catholic Church	1842	11 November 1993	SE6476624310; 53°42′40″N 1°01′13″W	1148399	Church of St Mary (Roman Catholic) More images
Church of St Mary	Carlton Husthwaite	Chapel of Ease	c. 1675	17 May 1960	SE4997076713; 54°11′02″N 1°14′09″W	1190878	Church of St Mary More images
Church of St Oswald	Castle Bolton	Church	Late 14th century	13 February 1967	SE0336491875; 54°19′21″N 1°56′59″W	1130886	Church of St Oswald More images
Church of St Michael	Copgrove	Sculpture	pre Christian	15 March 1966	SE3463963243; 54°03′50″N 1°28′20″W	1150343	Church of St Michael More images
Church of Holy Trinity	Coverham, Coverham with Agglethorpe	Cross	Anglo Saxon	13 February 1967	SE1039786369; 54°16′22″N 1°50′31″W	1130892	Church of Holy Trinity More images
Church of All Saints	Crathorne	Church	14th century	22 June 1966	NZ 44330 07559; 54°27′41″N 1°19′04″W	1150265	Church of All Saints More images
Church of St Mary	Crathorne	Roman Catholic Church	1777	23 June 1966	NZ4421807492; 54°27′39″N 1°19′10″W	1150262	Church of St Mary More images
Church of St John the Evangelist	Dalton	Church	1868	9 March 1988	SE4356176319; 54°10′51″N 1°20′03″W	1150818	Church of St John the Evangelist More images
Church of St Hilda	Danby Dale, Danby	Church	14th century	6 October 1969	NZ6961906309; 54°26′51″N 0°55′40″W	1316255	Church of St Hilda More images
Church of St Helen	Denton	Church	1776	22 November 1966	SE1448848918; 53°56′10″N 1°46′51″W	1174421	Church of St Helen More images
Church of Saint Michael and All Angels	Downholme	Church	12th century	4 February 1969	SE1106898334; 54°22′49″N 1°49′52″W	1179437	Church of Saint Michael and All Angels More images
Church of St John the Baptist and All Saints	Easingwold	Church	Pre c1200	17 May 1960	SE5255870043; 54°07′25″N 1°11′50″W	1294335	Church of St John the Baptist and All Saints More images
Church of St John the Baptist	East Ayton	Church	Early 12th century	18 January 1967	SE9913284952; 54°15′02″N 0°28′48″W	1167755	Church of St John the Baptist More images
Church of St Oswald	East Harlsey	Church	12th century	31 March 1970	SE4262399754; 54°23′29″N 1°20′42″W	1315125	Church of St Oswald More images
Church of St Mary the Virgin	Ebberston and Yedingham	Church	12th century	10 November 1953	SE8918783316; 54°14′16″N 0°37′59″W	1315780	Church of St Mary the Virgin More images
The Old Abbey and attached Farmbuilding	Ebberston and Yedingham	Farmhouse	Late 17th century	10 November 1953	SE8959079788; 54°12′22″N 0°37′41″W	1149556	Upload Photo
Church of St Michael	Edstone	Church	13th century	14 July 1955	SE7055184005; 54°14′49″N 0°55′08″W	1149266	Church of St Michael More images
Church of St Mary the Virgin	Eryholme	Church	c. 1200	18 March 1968	NZ3206509008; 54°28′32″N 1°30′24″W	1131336	Church of St Mary the Virgin More images
Church of St Helen	Escrick	Church	1857	17 November 1966	SE6280543127; 53°52′50″N 1°02′46″W	1167966	Church of St Helen More images
Church of St Felix	Felixkirk	Church	C12-C13	20 June 1966	SE4679284760; 54°15′23″N 1°17′00″W	1241255	Church of St Felix More images
Church of St Lawrence	Fewston	Church	Medieval	14 July 1987	SE1948254102; 53°58′57″N 1°42′16″W	1174478	Church of St Lawrence More images
Church of St Andrew	Finghall	Church	C9	13 February 1967	SE1906390166; 54°18′24″N 1°42′31″W	1131477	Church of St Andrew More images
Church of St John the Evangelist	Folkton	Tower	13th century	30 June 1966	TA0536079689; 54°12′08″N 0°23′11″W	1148153	Church of St John the Evangelist More images
Church of All Saints	Foston	Church	12th century	25 January 1954	SE6990865170; 54°04′40″N 0°55′59″W	1315740	Church of All Saints More images
Church of St Nicholas	Butterwick, Foxholes	Church	12th century	10 October 1966	SE9913971491; 54°07′47″N 0°29′04″W	1174510	Church of St Nicholas More images
Church of St Stephen	Robin Hood's Bay, Fylingdales	Parish Church	1868–1870	6 October 1969	NZ9486205281; 54°26′03″N 0°32′21″W	1148649	Church of St Stephen More images
Church of St Nicholas	Ganton	Church	13th century	10 October 1966	SE9898777599; 54°11′05″N 0°29′05″W	1149689	Church of St Nicholas More images
Church of St Mary	Gate Helmsley	Church	Early 13th century	29 January 1953	SE6907155217; 53°59′18″N 0°56′53″W	1149613	Church of St Mary More images
Giggleswick School Chapel	Giggleswick	Chapel	1897–1901	20 February 1958	SD8072063927; 54°04′15″N 2°17′46″W	1131724	Giggleswick School Chapel More images
Church of St James the Greater	Lealholm, Glaisdale	Church	1902	6 October 1969	NZ7632407674; 54°27′31″N 0°49′27″W	1178962	Church of St James the Greater More images
Wesleyan Chapel	Lealholm, Glaisdale	Wesleyan Methodist Chapel	1839	6 October 1969	NZ7611607575; 54°27′28″N 0°49′39″W	1316252	Wesleyan Chapel More images
Church of St Mary, Entrance Steps and Attached Handrail	Goathland Village, Goathland	Church	1894–1896	6 October 1969	NZ8277600700; 54°23′42″N 0°43′36″W	1174270	Church of St Mary, Entrance Steps and Attached Handrail More images
Church of St Mary	Great Ouseburn	Church	1779	15 March 1966	SE4491261782; 54°03′00″N 1°18′56″W	1150284	Church of St Mary More images
St Andrew's Chapel, Ribston Hall	Ribston Park, Great Ribston with Walshford	Chapel	13th century	15 March 1966	SE3920453755; 53°58′42″N 1°24′13″W	1294221	St Andrew's Chapel, Ribston Hall
Church of St Mary	Harrogate	Church	c. 1916	4 February 1975	SE2949154747; 53°59′17″N 1°33′06″W	1149482	Church of St Mary More images
Parish Church of St John	Bilton, Harrogate	Parish Church	Circa 1851-7	4 February 1975	SE3045257007; 54°00′29″N 1°32′13″W	1315827	Parish Church of St John More images
Parish Church of St Robert of Knaresborough	Pannal, Harrogate	Church Hall	C20	18 July 1949	SE3062051694; 53°57′38″N 1°32′05″W	1149449	Parish Church of St Robert of Knaresborough More images
Church of All Saints	Hawnby	Church	12th century	4 January 1955	SE5365189679; 54°18′00″N 1°10′38″W	1191164	Church of All Saints More images
Church of St John (previously St Helen)	Healaugh	Parish Church	12th century	12 July 1985	SE4984947913; 53°55′30″N 1°14′33″W	1316655	Church of St John (previously St Helen) More images
Church of Saint Paul	Healey	Church	1848	9 August 1966	SE1829480670; 54°13′17″N 1°43′15″W	1132072	Church of Saint Paul More images
Church of St. Peter	Hebden	Church	1841	25 January 1994	SE0260062967; 54°03′45″N 1°57′42″W	1203742	Church of St. Peter More images
Church of All Saints	Helmsley	Church	12th century	4 January 1955	SE6118483871; 54°14′49″N 1°03′45″W	1149308	Church of All Saints More images
St Aidan's Church	Carlton, Helmsley	Former Church	1884–1887	13 February 2001	SE6101486672; 54°16′19″N 1°03′53″W	1392849	St Aidan's Church More images
Church of St Mary Magdelene	Helmsley	Church	1882	18 March 1985	SE6096890347; 54°18′18″N 1°03′52″W	1149272	Church of St Mary Magdelene More images
Church of St Paul	Hensall	Church	1854	11 December 1967	SE5829322596; 53°41′48″N 1°07′07″W	1295734	Church of St Paul More images
Church of All Saints	Hovingham	Church	10th century	25 January 1954	SE6666075730; 54°10′23″N 0°58′49″W	1148990	Church of All Saints More images
Church of All Saints	Hunmanby	Tower	12th century	30 June 1966	TA0958477470; 54°10′53″N 0°19′21″W	1316442	Church of All Saints More images
Church of St Nicholas	Husthwaite	Church	12th century	17 May 1960	SE5183175112; 54°10′09″N 1°12′27″W	1150764	Church of St Nicholas More images
Church of All Saints	Ingleby Cross, Ingleby Arncliffe	Parish Church	Medieval	23 June 1966	NZ4527100270; 54°23′45″N 1°18′15″W	1151374	Church of All Saints More images
Church of St Mary the Virgin	Ingleton	Church	15th century	20 February 1958	SD6951273260; 54°09′15″N 2°28′06″W	1252726	Church of St Mary the Virgin More images
Chapel at Scargill House, including linking passage, staircase and vestry	Kettlewell with Starbotton	Steps	1958–61	25 September 1998	SD9779971067; 54°08′08″N 2°02′07″W	1376604	Chapel at Scargill House, including linking passage, staircase and vestry More images
Church of St Mary	Kettlewell	Church	1820	10 September 1954	SD9714072255; 54°08′46″N 2°02′43″W	1173574	Church of St Mary More images
Church of St Mary	Low Kilburn, Kilburn High and Low	Church	18th century	20 June 1966	SE5136979676; 54°12′37″N 1°12′50″W	1190640	Church of St Mary More images
Church of St Andrew	Kirby Grindalythe	Church	12th century	10 October 1966	SE9037467517; 54°05′44″N 0°37′11″W	1174946	Church of St Andrew More images
Church of St Laurence	Kirby Misperton	Church	14th century	10 November 1953	SE7792379545; 54°12′21″N 0°48′25″W	1167989	Church of St Laurence More images
Church of St John the Baptist	Kirby Wiske	Church	12th century	20 June 1966	SE3763084832; 54°15′28″N 1°25′26″W	1281456	Church of St John the Baptist More images
Church of St Augustine	Kirkby	Parish Church	Early Medieval	23 June 1966	NZ5383806050; 54°26′49″N 1°10′17″W	1189284	Church of St Augustine More images
Church of St Mary	Kirkby Fleetham with Fencote	Church	12th century	22 August 1966	SE2812195722; 54°21′23″N 1°34′08″W	1150928	Church of St Mary More images
Church of St John the Baptist	Kirkby Wharfe with North Milford	Church	pre Conquest	3 February 1967	SE5060841071; 53°51′48″N 1°13′55″W	1148423	Church of St John the Baptist More images
Church of St Peter	Kirk Smeaton	Church	12th century	25 March 1968	SE5201116638; 53°38′37″N 1°12′53″W	1316345	Church of St Peter More images
Saint Robert's Cave, also called Saint Roberts Chapel, about 120m South West of Grimbald Bridge	Knaresborough	Chapel	1160–1218	5 February 1952	SE3610056087; 53°59′58″N 1°27′03″W	1149914	Saint Robert's Cave, also called Saint Roberts Chapel, about 120m South West of Grimbald Bridge More images
Chapel of St Mary	Lead	Chapel	12th century	3 February 1967	SE4642836896; 53°49′35″N 1°17′46″W	1148440	Chapel of St Mary More images
Methodist Church and retaining Wall with Gate and Steps	Leathley	Gate	1826	22 February 1985	SE2343247183; 53°55′13″N 1°38′41″W	1150014	Methodist Church and retaining Wall with Gate and Steps More images
Church of St Mary	Levisham	Former Church	11th century	10 November 1953	SE8324290030; 54°17′57″N 0°43′21″W	1280303	Church of St Mary More images
St Peter and St Paul's Church	Leyburn	Church	1835	24 January 1986	SE1122390716; 54°18′43″N 1°49′44″W	1130906	St Peter and St Paul's Church More images
Church of St Michael and All Angels	Linton	Church	12th century	10 September 1954	SE0050863229; 54°03′54″N 1°59′37″W	1167172	Church of St Michael and All Angels More images
Church of St Giles	Lockton	Church	13th century	10 November 1953	SE8431990002; 54°17′55″N 0°42′21″W	1260741	Church of St Giles More images
Church of St Mary	West Lutton, Luttons	Church	1874–75	10 October 1966	SE9306469225; 54°06′38″N 0°34′41″W	1149659	Church of St Mary More images
Church of St Michael	Malton	Church	c. 1150	29 September 1951	SE7856471716; 54°08′07″N 0°47′57″W	1201930	Church of St Michael More images
Malton Meeting House and attached Walls bounding Quaker Burial Ground	Malton	Gate	18th century	29 September 1951	SE7872971890; 54°08′13″N 0°47′47″W	1291410	Malton Meeting House and attached Walls bounding Quaker Burial Ground More images
Malton Methodist Church	Malton	Methodist Chapel	1811	10 June 1974	SE7866371684; 54°08′06″N 0°47′51″W	1220043	Malton Methodist Church More images
Church of All Saints	Manfield	Church	1796–1802	18 March 1968	NZ2226813377; 54°30′55″N 1°39′27″W	1131339	Church of All Saints More images
Church of St Edmund King and Martyr	Marske	Parish Church	12th century	4 February 1969	NZ1045500501; 54°24′00″N 1°50′26″W	1301436	Church of St Edmund King and Martyr More images
Church of St Mary	Marton-cum-Moxby	Church	12th century	17 May 1960	SE6020468249; 54°06′24″N 1°04′51″W	1241740	Church of St Mary More images
Church of St Peter	Martons Both	Parish church	12th century	10 September 1954	SD9080750690; 53°57′08″N 2°08′30″W	1167226	Church of St Peter More images
Church of Saint Mary	Masham	Church	12th century	9 August 1966	SE2267480670; 54°13′17″N 1°39′14″W	1166880	Church of Saint Mary More images
Church of St James	Melsonby	Cross	c800	4 February 1969	NZ2011408444; 54°28′15″N 1°41′28″W	1167040	Church of St James More images
Church of All Saints	Moor Monkton	Church	12th century	15 March 1966	SE5109656032; 53°59′52″N 1°13′19″W	1293654	Church of All Saints More images
Red House School Chapel	Moor Monkton	Chapel	Early 17th century	8 March 1952	SE5297857081; 54°00′25″N 1°11′35″W	1190840	Red House School Chapel More images
Church of Saint Mary	Muker	Church	1580	7 December 1966	SD9105597880; 54°22′35″N 2°08′21″W	1302046	Church of Saint Mary More images
Church of St Mary	Myton-on-Swale	Church	13th century	17 May 1960	SE4392366644; 54°05′38″N 1°19′48″W	1294251	Church of St Mary More images
Church of St Laurence	Newby and Scalby	Church	C12-C13	26 November 1985	TA0090990329; 54°17′55″N 0°27′03″W	1148211	Church of St Laurence More images
Church of St Andrew	Normanby	Church	Mid 12th century	10 November 1953	SE7348181656; 54°13′31″N 0°52′28″W	1149710	Church of St Andrew More images
Church of St Peter	Osmotherley	Church	12th century	31 March 1970	SE4556797186; 54°22′05″N 1°18′01″W	1188638	Church of St Peter More images
Church of Saint Oswald	Oswaldkirk	Church	Saxon	4 January 1955	SE6208578922; 54°12′08″N 1°02′59″W	1173343	Church of Saint Oswald More images
Church of St Mary	Over Silton	Church	12th century	31 March 1970	SE4560493166; 54°19′55″N 1°18′01″W	1150956	Church of St Mary More images
Church of All Saints	Pickhill with Roxby	Church	12th century	20 June 1966	SE3472083754; 54°14′54″N 1°28′07″W	1204105	Church of All Saints More images
Church of St Mary	Raskelf	Church	12th century	17 May 1960	SE4894770767; 54°07′50″N 1°15′09″W	1294222	Church of St Mary More images
Church of St Mary	Redmire	Church	12th century	13 February 1967	SE0508790800; 54°18′46″N 1°55′24″W	1130873	Church of St Mary More images
Church of Saint Peter	Reighton	Church	12th century	30 June 1966	TA1309475226; 54°09′37″N 0°16′10″W	1296580	Church of Saint Peter More images
Church of St Leonard	Speeton, Reighton	Church	Anglo-Danish	30 June 1966	TA1513574699; 54°09′19″N 0°14′18″W	1148130	Church of St Leonard More images
Parish Church of St Mary	Richmond	Parish Church	Late 12th century	1 August 1952	NZ1743201066; 54°24′17″N 1°43′59″W	1289814	Parish Church of St Mary More images
Church of All Saints	Ripley	Church	c. 1400	15 March 1966	SE2833260505; 54°02′23″N 1°34′08″W	1174051	Church of All Saints More images
Church of St Wilfrid	Ripon	Roman Catholic Church	1858–62	19 March 1984	SE3107371544; 54°08′20″N 1°31′33″W	1173834	Church of St Wilfrid More images
Church of St Mary	Roecliffe	Church	1843	15 March 1966	SE3756266019; 54°05′19″N 1°25′38″W	1150316	Church of St Mary More images
Church of St Andrew (United Reformed)	Scarborough	Congregational Chapel	1864-8	8 June 1973	TA0410087761; 54°16′30″N 0°24′10″W	1243011	Church of St Andrew (United Reformed) More images
Church of St Columba	Scarborough	Church	1926	19 March 1981	TA0359288969; 54°17′09″N 0°24′37″W	1272794	Church of St Columba More images
St Peter and St Paul's Church	Scrayingham	Church	8th century	22 August 1966	SE7328860390; 54°02′04″N 0°52′57″W	1295421	St Peter and St Paul's Church More images
Church of St Radegund	Scruton	Church	12th century	22 August 1966	SE3003692552; 54°19′40″N 1°32′23″W	1150897	Church of St Radegund More images
Church of St Cuthbert	Sessay	Church	1847–48	20 December 1988	SE4642574729; 54°09′59″N 1°17′26″W	1190725	Church of St Cuthbert More images
Friends Meeting House	Settle	Friends meeting house	1678	13 September 1988	SD8181963663; 54°04′07″N 2°16′45″W	1166732	Friends Meeting House More images
Church of All Saints	Settrington	Church	Late C12-Early 13th century	10 October 1966	SE8393370271; 54°07′17″N 0°43′02″W	1173883	Church of All Saints More images
Church of St Hilda	Sherburn	Church	Early 12th century	10 October 1966	SE9595077433; 54°11′01″N 0°31′52″W	1175457	Church of St Hilda More images
Church of All Saints	Sinnington	Church	12th century	10 November 1953	SE7463886062; 54°15′53″N 0°51′20″W	1288816	Church of All Saints More images
Christ Church	Skipton	Church	1837–39	2 March 1978	SD9882451338; 53°57′29″N 2°01′10″W	1131846	Christ Church More images
Church of All Saints, Slingsby	Slingsby	Church	13th century	25 January 1954	SE6968274984; 54°09′57″N 0°56′03″W	1149788	Church of All Saints, Slingsby More images
Church of St Wilfrid	South Kilvington	Church	12th century	20 June 1966	SE4258884006; 54°15′00″N 1°20′52″W	1241263	Church of St Wilfrid More images
Church of St Oswald	Sowerby	Church	Norman	20 June 1966	SE4311581374; 54°13′35″N 1°20′25″W	1151342	Church of St Oswald More images
Church of All Saints	Spofforth with Stockeld	Church	Late 12th century	30 March 1966	SE3646451079; 53°57′16″N 1°26′45″W	1149981	Church of All Saints More images
Church of St Nicholas	Stillington	Church	Late 15th century	17 May 1960	SE5830567833; 54°06′11″N 1°06′35″W	1281543	Church of St Nicholas More images
Church of the Holy Trinity	Stonegrave	Cross	10th century	4 January 1955	SE6557077880; 54°11′33″N 0°59′48″W	1173360	Church of the Holy Trinity More images
Church of St Mary	Tadcaster	Church	Early C14-Early 15th century	12 July 1985	SE4859343507; 53°53′08″N 1°15′44″W	1167462	Church of St Mary More images
Church of All Saints	Great Thirkleby, Thirkleby High and Low with Osgodby	Church	1851	20 December 1988	SE4731178732; 54°12′08″N 1°16′34″W	1315254	Church of All Saints More images
Church of Saint Mary	Thixendale	Church	1868–1870	10 October 1966	SE8422161070; 54°02′19″N 0°42′56″W	1316014	Church of Saint Mary More images
Church of St Mary Magdalene	Thormanby	Church	12th century	17 May 1960	SE4959274968; 54°10′05″N 1°14′31″W	1191364	Church of St Mary Magdalene More images
Church of St Oswald	Thornton in Lonsdale	Church	15th century	20 February 1958	SD6857173618; 54°09′27″N 2°28′58″W	1252730	Church of St Oswald More images
Church of All Saints	Thornton-le-Dale	Church	14th century	10 November 1953	SE8382783127; 54°14′13″N 0°42′55″W	1241098	Church of All Saints More images
Church of Saint Hilda	Ellerburn, Thornton-le-Dale	Church	11th century	5 February 1986	SE8414284218; 54°14′48″N 0°42′37″W	1074194	Church of Saint Hilda More images
Church of St Leonard	Thornton-le-Street	Church	12th century	20 June 1966	SE4141886232; 54°16′12″N 1°21′56″W	1315196	Church of St Leonard More images
Church of St Oswald	Thornton Steward	Cross	Saxon	15 February 1967	SE1705086939; 54°16′40″N 1°44′23″W	1130925	Church of St Oswald More images
Church of All Saints	Thorpe Bassett	Church	12th century	10 October 1966	SE8581773459; 54°08′59″N 0°41′15″W	1149491	Church of All Saints More images
Chapel of Saint Mary Magdalen	Thrintoft	Chapel	C13-C16	29 January 1953	SE3189092972; 54°19′53″N 1°30′40″W	1315439	Chapel of Saint Mary Magdalen More images
Church of St Columba	Topcliffe	Church	13th century	20 June 1966	SE3996576037; 54°10′43″N 1°23′21″W	1315200	Church of St Columba More images
Church of St Mary	Wath	Church	13th century	22 July 1955	SE3251377152; 54°11′21″N 1°30′12″W	1173160	Church of St Mary More images
Church of St Barnabas	Weeton	Church	1851-3	30 March 1966	SE2838346503; 53°54′50″N 1°34′10″W	1149990	Church of St Barnabas More images
Church of Saint Mary	Westow	Church	Saxon	10 October 1966	SE7593166053; 54°05′05″N 0°50′27″W	1149059	Church of Saint Mary More images
Church of St Oswald	West Rounton	Church	12th century	13 November 1987	NZ4139003409; 54°25′28″N 1°21′49″W	1293683	Church of St Oswald More images
Church of Saint Martin	Wharram Percy, Wharram	Church	Early 10th century	10 October 1966	SE8582564209; 54°04′00″N 0°41′24″W	1316019	Church of Saint Martin More images
Church of St Martin	Whenby	Church	15th century	17 May 1960	SE6307869820; 54°07′13″N 1°02′11″W	1191384	Church of St Martin More images
Brunswick Methodist Church and the Brunswick Room	Whitby	Meeting Hall	1891-2	23 December 1994	NZ8973110932; 54°29′09″N 0°36′59″W	1261233	Brunswick Methodist Church and the Brunswick Room More images
Church of St Hilda	West Cliff, Whitby	Parish Church	1884–86	9 January 1996	NZ8945811259; 54°29′20″N 0°37′14″W	1272560	Church of St Hilda More images
Church of St Ninian	Whitby	Church	1776–1778	23 February 1954	NZ8981810964; 54°29′10″N 0°36′54″W	1148349	Church of St Ninian More images
St Columbans	Whitby	House	1790	23 February 1954	NZ8954310272; 54°28′48″N 0°37′10″W	1254352	St Columbans More images
The Missions to Seamen	Whitby	House	Late 18th century	23 February 1954	NZ8982811109; 54°29′15″N 0°36′54″W	1316432	The Missions to Seamen More images
Church of St John Evangelist	Whitwell-on-the-Hill	Church	1858–60	15 July 1985	SE7242265889; 54°05′02″N 0°53′40″W	1149602	Church of St John Evangelist More images
Church of the Ascension	Whixley	Church	Early 14th century	15 March 1966	SE4420458297; 54°01′08″N 1°19′37″W	1189906	Church of the Ascension More images
Church of St Peter	Willerby	Church	13th century	10 October 1966	TA0082879175; 54°11′54″N 0°27′21″W	1175601	Church of St Peter More images
All Saints Church	Wykeham	Church	1853–1855	18 January 1967	SE9648283393; 54°14′14″N 0°31′16″W	1316131	All Saints Church More images
