= St Peter's Church, Reighton =

Church in Reighton, North Yorkshire, England

Coordinates: 54°09′38″N 0°16′10″W

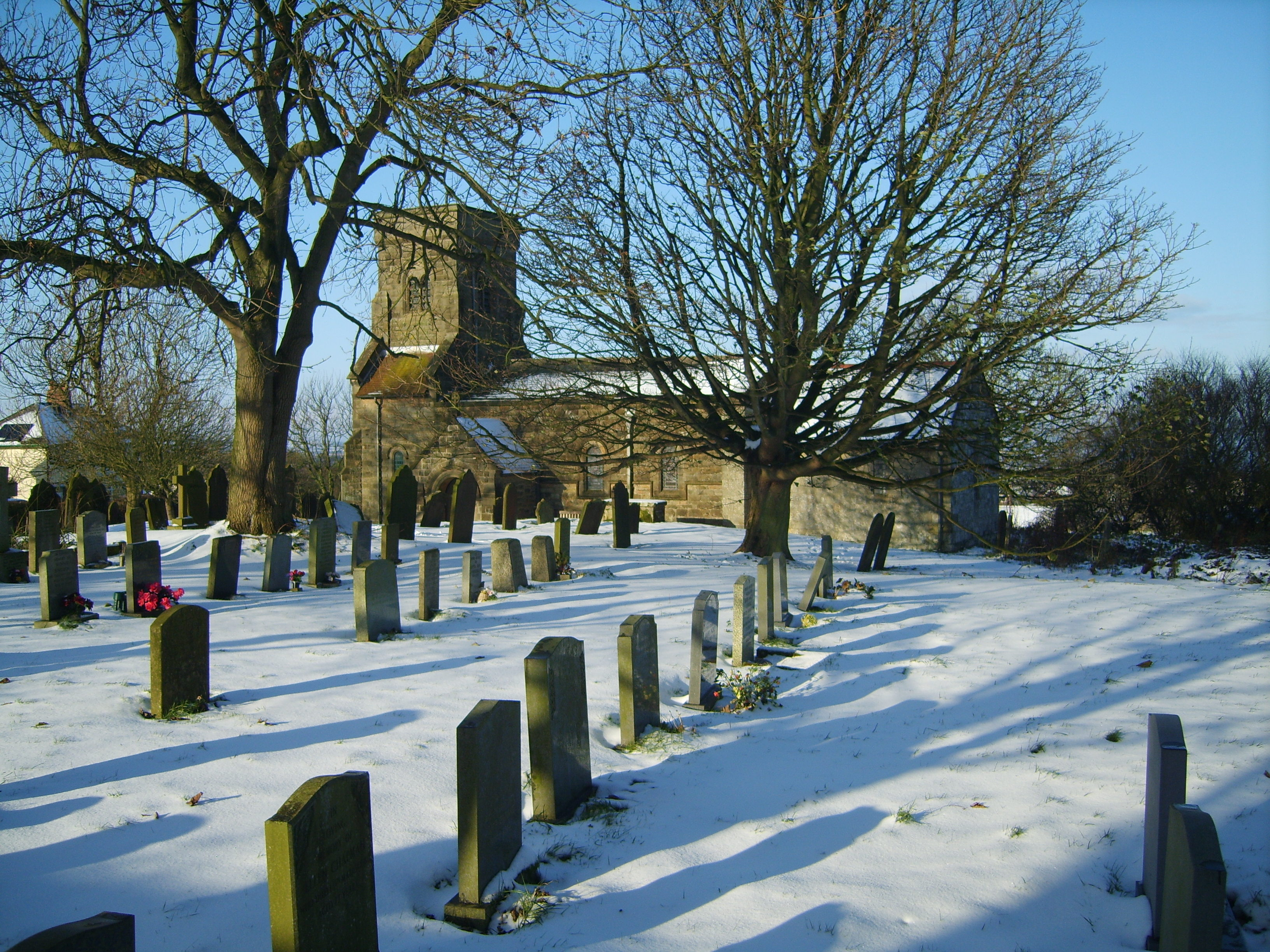
The church, in 2008

St Peter's Church is the parish church of Reighton, a village in North Yorkshire, in England.

A church was built in Reighton in the 12th century. In 1848, it was described as "extremely ancient", and it had seating for up to 104 worshippers. The church was largely rebuilt between 1897 and 1905, to a design by Frederick Stead Brodrick, Arthur Lowther and William Walker. They retained only the chancel and an arcade from the original building. The church was grade II* listed in 1966.

The church is built of sandstone, and has a roof partly of tile and partly of slate. It consists of a nave, a north aisle, a south porch, a chancel and a west tower. The tower has two stages, with diagonal buttresses, two-light bell openings, and a coped parapet. The porch has a round-arched opening, and the south door has Norman jambs. Inside, there is a square Norman font, which Historic England describe as "magnificent".

== See also ==
- Grade II* listed churches in North Yorkshire (district)
- Listed buildings in Reighton
