= St Mary Magdalene's Church, East Moors =

Church in North Yorkshire, England

Coordinates: 54°18′18″N 1°03′52″W

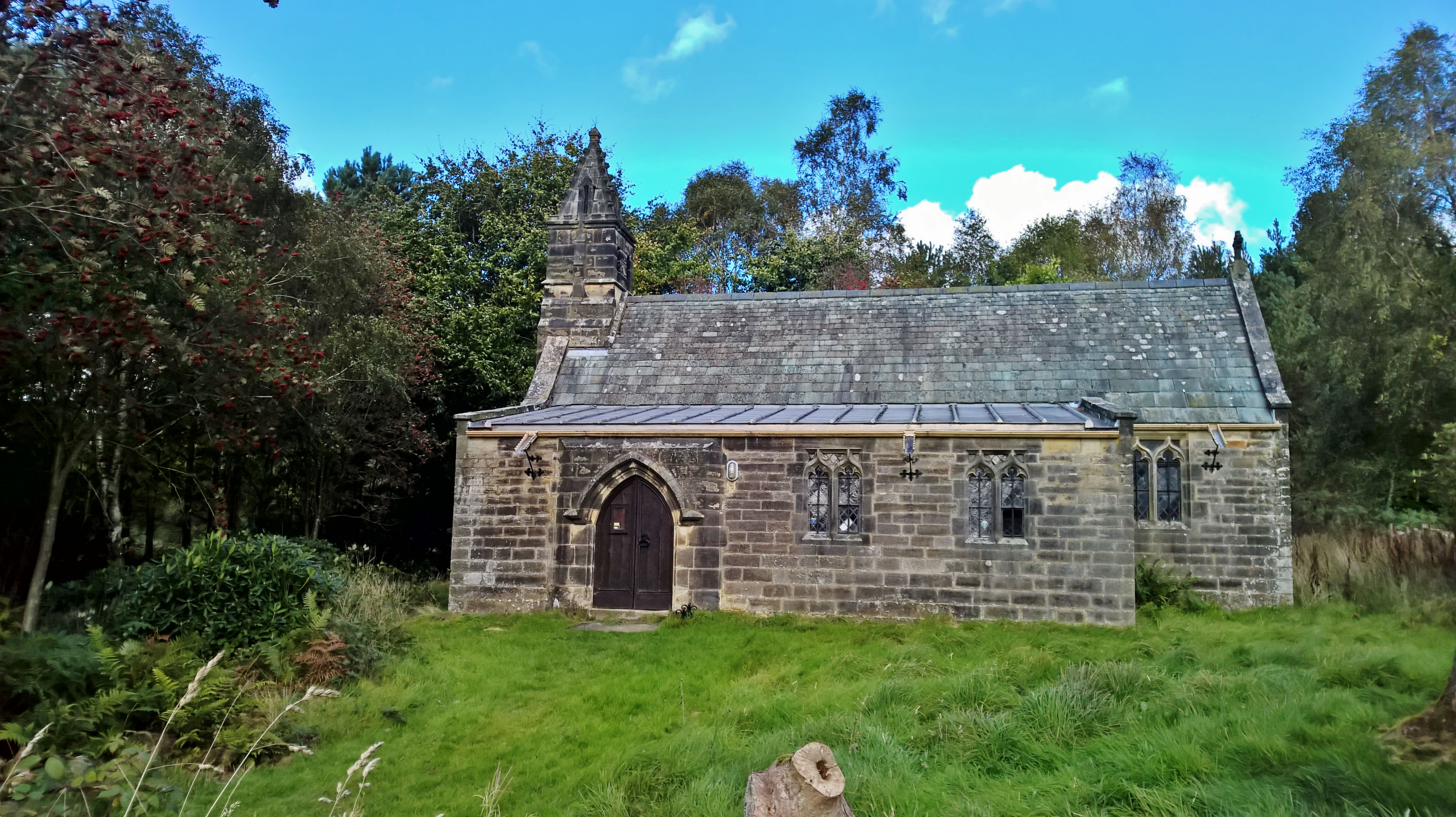
The church, in 2016

St Mary Magdalene's Church is an Anglican church in the East Moors area north of Helmsley, a town in North Yorkshire, in England.

The moorland area long fell within the parish of All Saints' Church, Helmsley, but is distant from the church, and by the late 19th century there were 200 residents in the area who were rarely able to attend services. The church was designed by George Gilbert Scott Jr. with assistance from Temple Moore, and was completed in 1882. Nikolaus Pevsner claims that Moore "obviously enjoyed this job thoroughly, and his pleasure is infectious". In the early years, clergy would ride out in an evening and sleep in the church in order to reach the location early enough for a morning service. John Betjeman wrote a poem, "Perp. Revival i' the North", about the church. It was grade II* listed in 1985.

The church is built of sandstone, the roof of the nave is in Westmorland slate and that of the aisle is in lead. The church consists of a nave, a chancel, and a lean-to south aisle. At the west end is a bellcote with two Tudor arched bell openings, and a pinnacle with lucarnes and crockets. Inside, there are a simple font, reading desk and pews, all designed by Moore, a painted wooden reredos and iron light fittings, under a barrel roof.

== See also ==
- Grade II* listed churches in North Yorkshire (district)
- Listed buildings in Helmsley
