= St Wilfrid's Church, Ripon =

St Wilfrid's Church
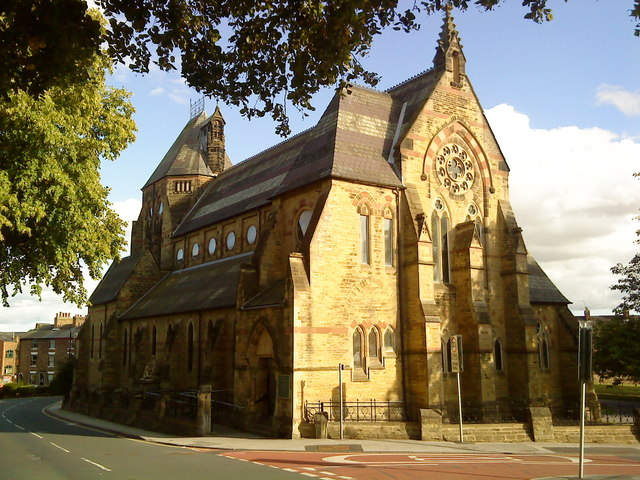
- St Wilfrid's Church
- 54.1388°N 1.5259°W
- OS grid reference: SE 31073 71544
- Location: Ripon
- Country: England
- Denomination: Roman Catholic
- Website: StWilfridRipon.org.uk

History
- Status: Parish church
- Founder: Fr Garstang
- Dedication: Saint Wilfrid

Architecture
- Functional status: Active
- Heritage designation: Grade II* listed
- Designated: 19 March 1984
- Architect: Joseph Hansom
- Style: Gothic Revival
- Groundbreaking: 21 November 1860
- Completed: 23 April 1862

Administration
- Province: Liverpool
- Diocese: Leeds
- Deanery: Harrogate
- Parish: St Wilfrid's, Ripon

St Wilfrid's Church is a Roman Catholic parish church in Ripon, North Yorkshire, England. It was built from 1860 to 1862 and designed by Joseph Hansom. It is located on the corner of Trinity Lane and Coltsgate Hill to the north of the centre of Ripon. It is in the Gothic Revival style and is a Grade II* listed building.

== History ==
=== Foundation ===
From the Reformation until the end of the nineteenth century, local Catholics in Ripon gathered for Mass in chapels such as in Fountains Hall and Bishop Thornton. In 1850, the priest that served the mission in Ripon was a Fr Garstang. He was the first to say Mass in Ripon at Heath Court in Low Skellgate. He wanted to build a church in Ripon, but local opposition initially stopped this from happening.

=== Construction ===
After seeing opposition to the building of a Catholic church in Ripon, Fr Garstang sought out someone else to buy some land for the church on his behalf. Thomas Bradwell bought the site of the current church. On 21 November 1860 the foundation stone was laid by Fr Joseph Render, the Vicar General of the Diocese of Beverley. The plans were made by Joseph Hansom and included a church, school and presbytery. The reredos was designed by E. W. Pugin. According to Historic England, the chapel at Alton Castle and Church of the Saintes Maries de la Mer influenced the design of St Wilfrid's Church. The cost of the church was £5,000 and was financed by the priest Canon Vavasour and the Vavasour family of Hazlewood Castle. On 23 April 1862, the church was opened by the Bishop of Beverley Robert Cornthwaite, the Bishop of Hexham and Newcastle William Hogarth, the Bishop of Nottingham Richard Roskell and the Bishop of Liverpool Alexander Goss.

=== Developments ===
On 2 July 1863 the school was opened. In 1874, George Robinson, 1st Marquess of Ripon became a Catholic and paid for the building of the Lady chapel. In 1909 he died and bequeathed certain fittings from St Mary's, Studley Royal to St Wilfrid's Church.

== Parish ==
St Wilfrid's Church has its own parish and has two Sunday Masses at 5:30 pm on Saturday and 10:00 am on Sunday.

== See also ==
- Media related to St Wilfrid's Church, Ripon at Wikimedia Commons
- Diocese of Leeds
- Grade II* listed churches in North Yorkshire (district)
- Listed buildings in Ripon
