= St Michael and St Lawrence's Church, Fewston =

Church in Fewston, North Yorkshire, England

Coordinates: 53°58′58″N 1°42′16″W

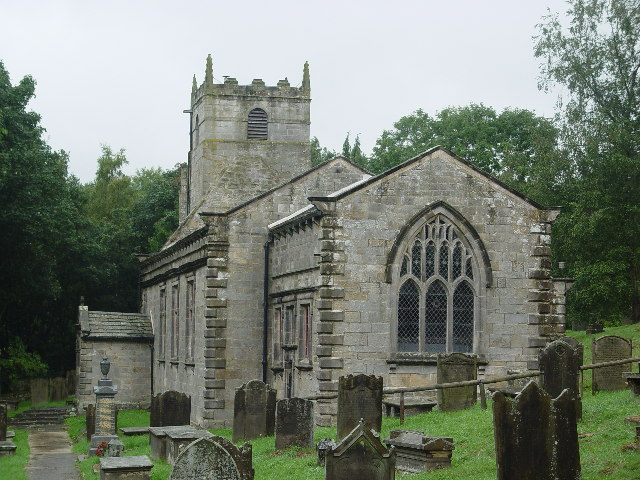
The church, in 2005

St Michael and St Lawrence's Church is an Anglican church in Fewston, a village in North Yorkshire, in England.

A church was first built in Fewston in the 12th century, and the mediaeval tower survives. The remainder of the church was rebuilt in 1697, from which time the font also dates. The tower was restored in about 1800, while the church was further altered later in the century. It was grade II* listed in 1987.

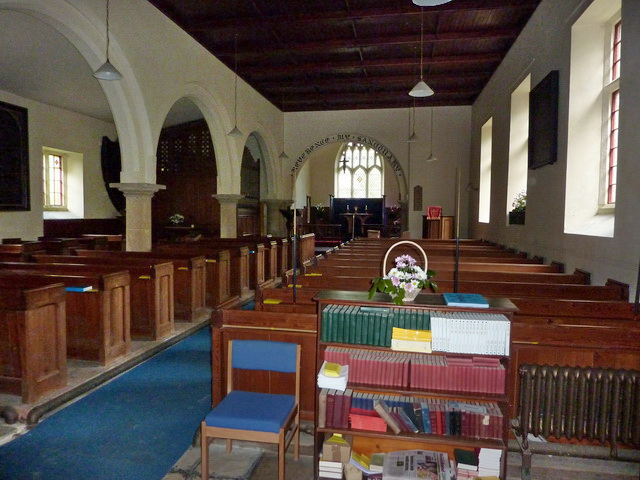
Interior of the church, looking east

The church is built of gritstone with a stone slate roof, and consists of a five-bay nave, a north aisle, a south porch, a three-bay chancel and a west tower. The tower has three stages, diagonal buttresses, round-arched bell openings with an impost band, a coved cornice, and an embattled parapet with corner pinnacles. The porch has a shallow segmental arch, pilasters, a projecting band, and a dated keystone, above which is a pulvinated frieze, a cornice, a coped gable with shaped kneelers, and a cross at the apex.

== See also ==
- Grade II* listed churches in North Yorkshire (district)
- Listed buildings in Fewston
