= Wesley Centre =

Building in Malton, North Yorkshire, England

Coordinates: 54°08′06″N 0°47′52″W

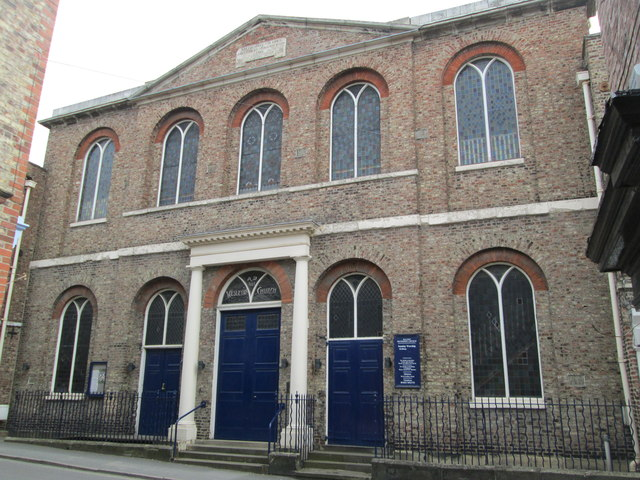
The building, in 2014

The Wesley Centre is a historic building in Malton, North Yorkshire, a town in England.

John Wesley preached in Malton in the 1770s, and in 1811 the Wesleyan Methodist Church built a church on Saville Street in the town. The building was grade II listed in 1974, and was upgraded to grade II* in 1995. In 2015, structural issues were discovered with the roof, and the Methodist Church twice attempted to sell the building, without success. Instead, £2 million was raised to restore the building, so that the main hall would become a 600-seat concert venue. The building will also host Sunday religious services, a community cafe, and a food bank.

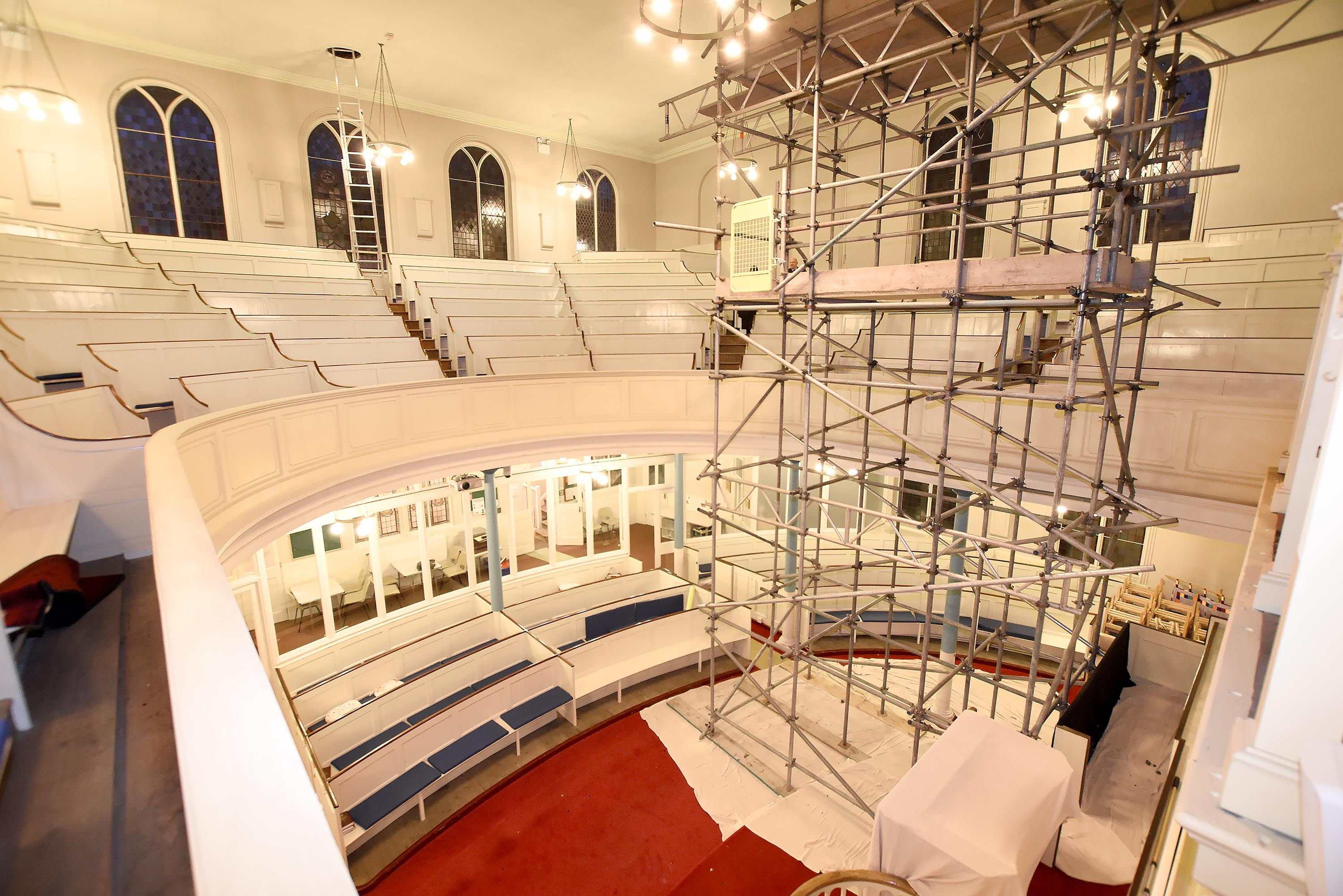
Interior of the church

The church is built of pink and cream mottled brick on a stone plinth, with dressings of stone and orange-red brick, a floor band, a sill band, an eaves band, and a hipped pantile roof. There are two storeys and a front of five bays, the middle three bays projecting under a pediment containing a scrolled datestone. Steps lead up to the central doorway that has engaged Tuscan columns, a semicircular traceried fanlight, a plain frieze and a moulded dentilled cornice. This is flanked by doors with similar fanlights, and the outer bays and the upper floor contain round-headed windows with Y-tracery. All the openings are in round-headed recesses. Over the outer bays is a plain coped parapet.

== See also ==
- Grade II* listed churches in North Yorkshire (district)
- Listed buildings in Malton, North Yorkshire (central area)
