= Settle Quaker Meeting House =

Building in Settle, North Yorkshire, England

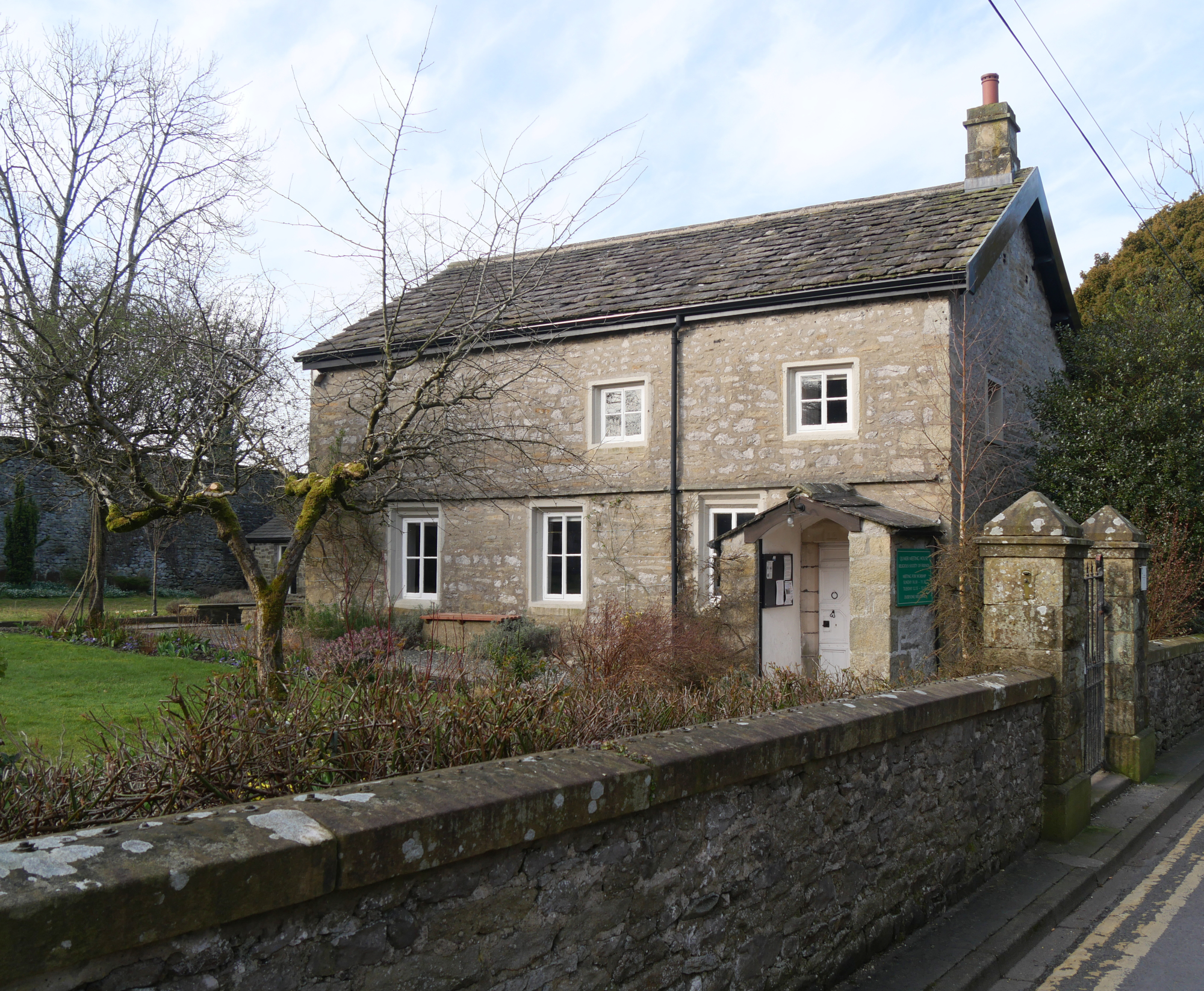
The building, in 2025

The Settle Quaker Meeting House is a historic building in Settle, North Yorkshire, a town in England.

Quakers began meeting in Settle in the 1650s, from 1661 at Howson's Croft, possible in a barn. In 1678, they built a dedicated meeting house and stable, at a cost of £80. Between 1729 and 1732, the roof was raised, enabling the insertion of a gallery, initially used as a women's meeting room. The interior was rearranged in about 1800. In the 1860s, an extension was constructed to the rear of the meeting house, serving initially as a schoolroom, but in 1872 a separate school was built, and it served as a library and reading room. A kitchen and toilet were added in 1927, and this enabled the building to be used by evacuees during World War II. In 2004, the kitchen was demolished and a new extension was constructed, while the floor of the rear extension was lowered. The building has been grade II* listed since 1988.

The meeting house is built of stone with sandstone dressings, a string course, and slate roofs. It has two storeys, and a later single-storey extension. On the right is a gabled porch containing a doorway with a cambered timber lintel. The windows are a mix of casements and sashes. Inside, there is a large meeting room with a plain panelled dado, a north gallery reached by a staircase from the west wing, and an Elder's stand to the south. It contains 19th-century furniture.

== See also ==
- Grade II* listed churches in North Yorkshire (district)
- Listed buildings in Settle, North Yorkshire
