= Listed buildings in Fewston =

Fewston is a civil parish in the county of North Yorkshire, England. It contains 13 listed buildings that are recorded in the National Heritage List for England. Of these, one is listed at Grade II*, the middle of the three grades, and the others are at Grade II, the lowest grade. The parish contains the village of Fewston and part of the village of Blubberhouses, and the surrounding countryside. Most of the listed buildings are houses, farmhouses and farm buildings, and the others include a church, a memorial and a sundial in the churchyard, and a guidestone.

== Key ==
| Grade | Criteria |
|---|---|
| II* | Particularly important buildings of more than special interest |
| II | Buildings of national importance and special interest |

== Buildings ==
| Name and location | Photograph | Date | Notes | Grade |
|---|---|---|---|---|
| St Lawrence's Church; 53.98265°N 1.70439°W | | Medieval | The oldest part of the church is the tower, with the body dating from 1697. It is built in gritstone with a stone slate roof, and consists of a nave, a north aisle, a south porch, a chancel and a west tower. The tower has three stages, diagonal buttresses, round-arched bell openings with an impost band, a coved cornice, and an embattled parapet with corner pinnacles. The porch has a shallow segmental arch, pilasters, a projecting band, and a dated keystone, above which is a pulvinated frieze, a cornice, a coped gable with shaped kneelers, and a cross at the apex. | II* |
| Memorial to John Brerey; 53.98264°N 1.70388°W | — | 1613 | The memorial is a chest tomb in the churchyard of St Lawrence's Church. It is in gritstone, and consists of a slab with a moulded edge on four blocks set on edge. On each block is an inscribed cross, and there is an inscription along the south edge of the top slab. | II |
| 1 and 2 Hopper Lane; 53.99442°N 1.74247°W | — | 1703 | A pair of houses in gritstone, with a stone slate roof, shaped kneelers and gable copings. There are two storeys and four bays. The left house has a doorway with tie-stone jambs, a shaped doorhead, and dated and initialled quoins, and the right house has a doorway with an inscribed and dated lintel. Both houses have mullioned windows with sashes. | II |
| Hardisty House; 53.99831°N 1.74063°W | — | 1728 | The house, which incorporates earlier material, is in gritstone, with quoins, and a stone slate roof with bulbous kneelers and gable coping. There are two storeys, two bays, and a rear outshut. The central doorway has moulded quoined jambs, and an initialled and dated ogee lintel. The windows on the front are recessed, chamfered and mullioned, at the rear is a stair window with a transom, and in the left return is a cross window. | II |
| Barn and stable range, Hardisty House; 53.99802°N 1.74017°W | — | Mid 18th century | The barn and stable range are in gritstone, with quoins, and a stone slate roof with shaped kneelers and gable coping. There are four bays and an added bay on the left. The main range contains a segmental-arched cart entrance and a byre door, both with quoined jambs, and a stable door with long and short jamb stones. On the left are external steps with a dog kennel beneath, and the added bay has a sliding door and a square pitching door. | II |
| Ivy Cottage; 53.98333°N 1.70472°W | — | Mid 18th century | A house in gritstone, with quoins, and a stone slate roof with shaped kneelers and gable coping. There are two storeys and two bays. The central doorway has quoined jambs, and the windows are mullioned. | II |
| Skaife Hall Farmhouse; 53.99818°N 1.74609°W | — | Mid 18th century | The farmhouse is in gritstone, with quoins, shaped gutter brackets, and a stone slate roof with shaped kneelers and gable coping. There are two storeys, three bays, and a projecting wing on the left. In the centre is a gabled porch with cast iron columns and a doorway with a fanlight. In the middle of the upper floor is as round-arched window with imposts and a keystone, and the other windows are mullioned. At the rear is a tall staircase window with a transom. | II |
| Barn, Sykes Hill Farm; 54.00062°N 1.73144°W | — | Mid 18th century | The barn is in gritstone, with quoins, and a stone slate roof with shaped kneelers and gable coping. There are four bays and an aisle. It contains a cart entrance with quoined jambs, a stable entrance, and rows of vents. | II |
| Sundial; 53.98249°N 1.70462°W | — | 18th century (probable) | The sundial is in the churchyard of St Lawrence's Church. It is in gritstone, and consists of a shaft about 1 metre (3 ft 3 in) high on a circular base. The gnomon is missing, and on the south side are inscribed initials. | II |
| Plane Trees Farmhouse and outbuildings 53.99971°N 1.72923°W | | Mid to late 18th century | The farmhouse and outbuildings are in gritstone, with quoins, the roof of the farmhouse is in stone slate, and there is some corrugated asbestos elsewhere. The house has two storeys and two bays, and a single-bay cottage on the left. To the right is a three-bay outbuilding with a hayloft, and further to the right is a four-bay barn. The house has a doorway with long and short quoined jambs, and mullioned windows. In the outbuilding is a shallow segmental arch with quoined jambs, and external steps to the hayloft, and the openings in the barn include a pitching door and slit vents. | II |
| Guidestone; 54.00806°N 1.74447°W | | Late 18th century (probable) | The guidestone by a road junction is in gritstone. It consists of a square column about 1 metre (3 ft 3 in) high. It is inscribed on three sides with pointing hands and the direction of named places. | II |
| High Apprentice House; 54.00027°N 1.74368°W | — | c. 1800 | The house is in gritstone, with shaped gutter brackets, and stone slate roofs with shaped kneelers and gable copings. The main block has three storeys and three bays, to the left is a two-storey two-bay extension, and further left is an arched gateway. In the main block is a round-arched doorway, and to the right a smaller flat-headed doorway. The windows on the front are sashes, those in the ground floor of the main block with round-arched heads. At the rear is a doorway with tie-stone jambs, and mullioned windows. | II |
| Barn and cattle shelter, Skaife Hall Farm; 53.99834°N 1.74642°W | — | c. 1820 | The farm buildings are in gritstone with moulded gutter brackets and a corrugated asbestos roof. They have an L-shaped plan, consisting of a range of two storeys and nine bays, and a two-bay barn. In the ground floor is an arcade of round arches with impost bands, and a circular pitching hole over each arch. The barn has a doorway with tie-stone jambs, a circular opening above, and a square window to the left. | II |
