= St Aidan's Church, Carlton =

Former church in Yorkshire, England

Coordinates: 54°16′20″N 1°03′52″W

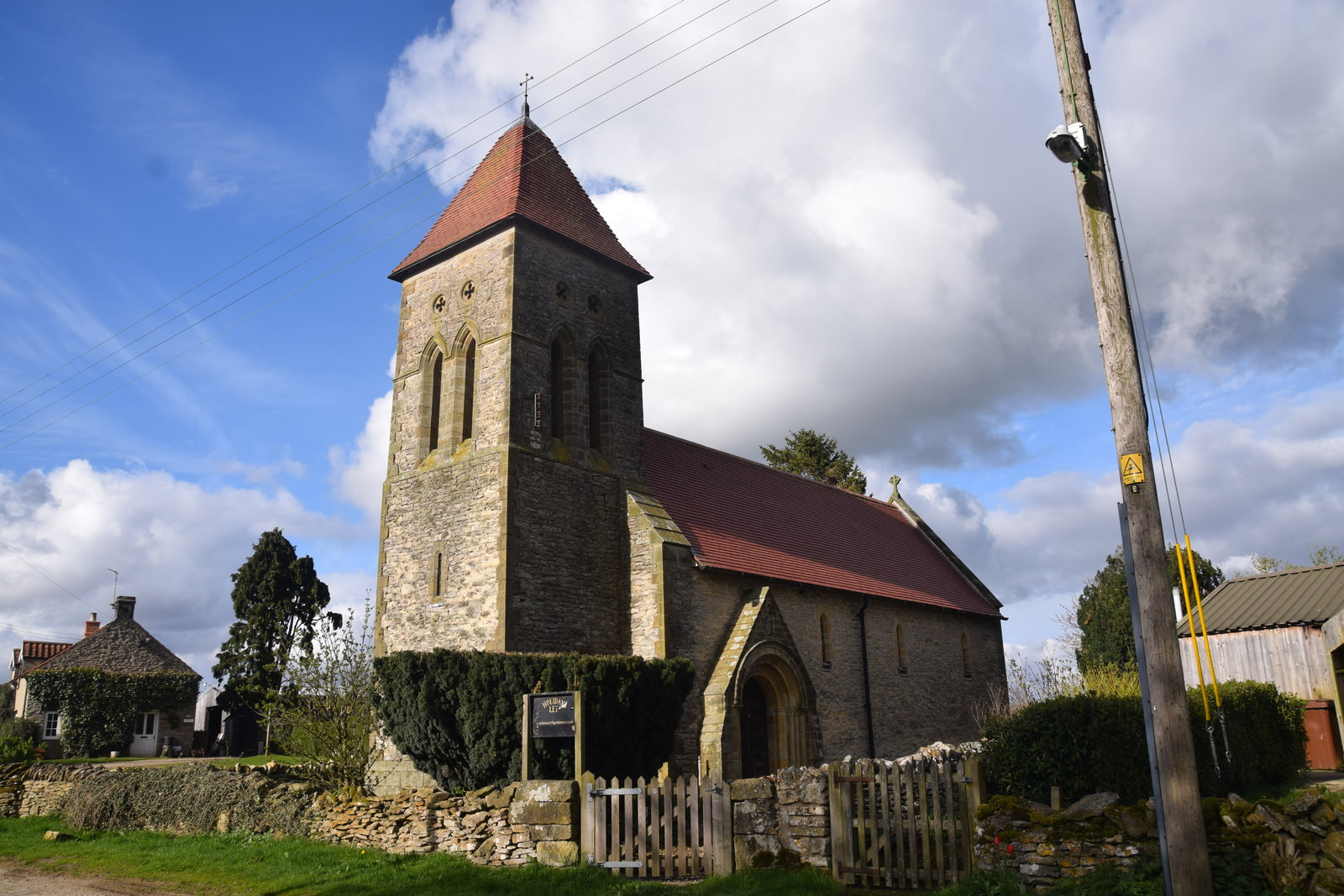
The building, in 2018

St Aidan's Church is a redundant Anglican church in Carlton, a hamlet north of the town of Helmsley, in North Yorkshire, in England.

The church was designed by Temple Moore in the Early English style, and was constructed between 1884 and 1887. The construction cost £530, considered low even at the time. It was Moore's first solo commission. It was grade II* listed in 2001. It closed around this time, and in 2012 was converted by the architect Jonathan Lindh into a holiday let. In 2020, it was marketed for sale, for £650,000.

The church is built of sandstone with a tile roof, and consists of a nave and a chancel under one roof, a south porch, and a west tower. The tower has a square plan, and contains a lancet window on the west side, string courses, and paired lancet bell openings, above which are circular openings with quatrefoil tracery. At the top is a pyramidal roof with a cross finial. The south doorway has a round arch with a moulded surround, above which is a niche containing a figure of Christ. As part of the conversion, an extension clad in dark zinc was added.

Inside, the church has a barrel vaulted ceiling which is painted and stencilled. The eastern window in the south wall has a large reveal, which includes a sedilia and piscina. The floor, covered in parquet, has one step up to the chancel, a second to the sanctuary, and a third to the altar. The east window has World War I-memorial stained glass, probably by Charles Eamer Kempe's company. All the fittings are by Moore, and have been preserved in the conversion; these include the wooden pews, altar, chancel screen and cupboard for prayer books, and the stone font.

== See also ==
- Grade II* listed churches in North Yorkshire (district)
- Listed buildings in Helmsley
