= St Hilda's Church, Westcliff =

Anglican church in Whitby, North Yorkshire

Coordinates: 54.4887°N 0.6202°W

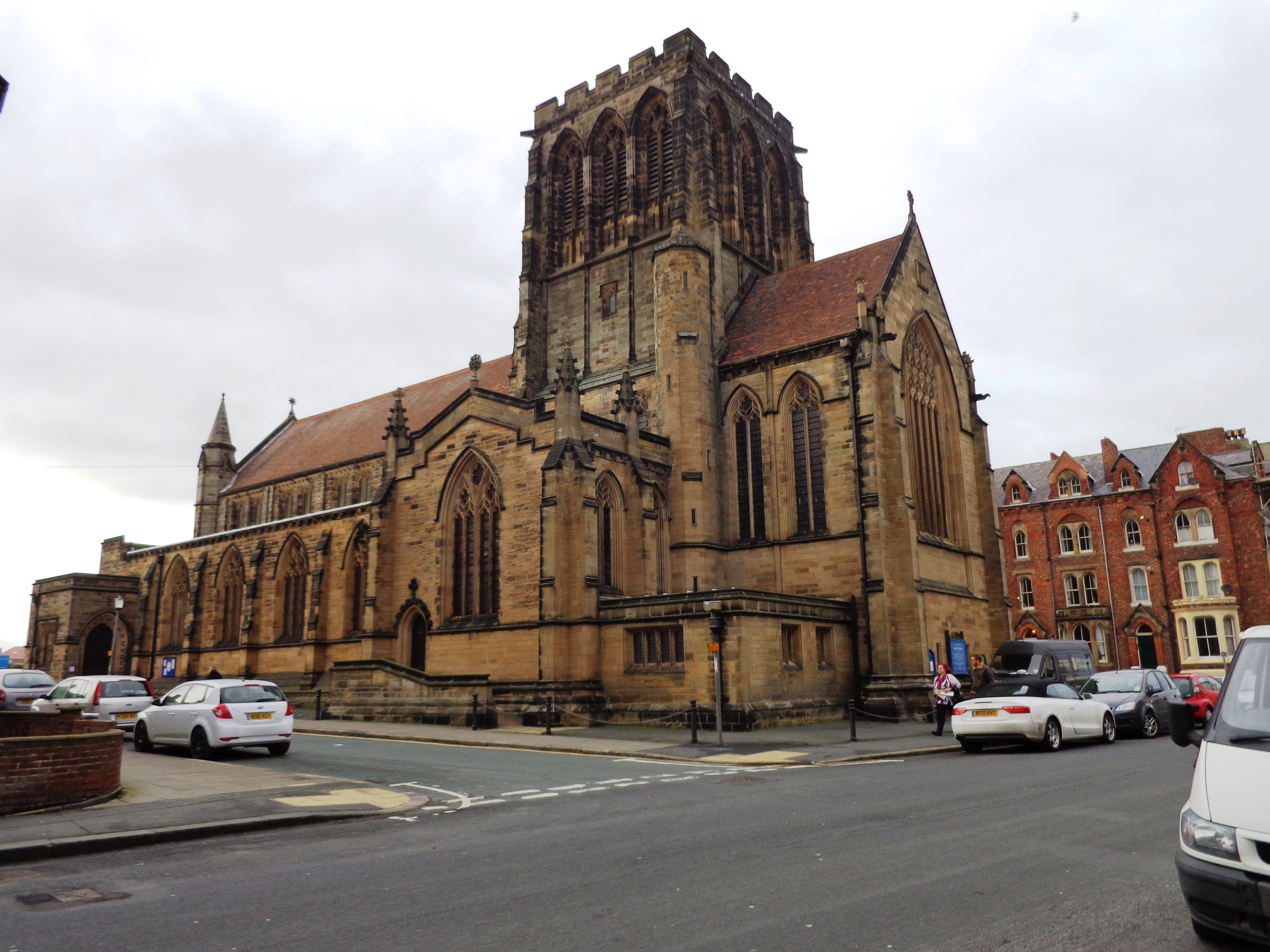
The church, in 2013

St Hilda's Church is an Anglican church in the West Cliff area of Whitby, a town in North Yorkshire, in England.

A chapel of ease on the site opened in the late 1870s, a temporary structure built of iron. A permanent building was designed by Robert James Johnson and was constructed between 1884 and 1886 (140 years ago). It is in the Decorated Gothic style, and cost £18,500 to build. The tower was only completed in 1938, to a design by G. E. Charnwood. It has been grade II* listed since 1996, and is described by Historic England as "a superb example of the late Gothic Revival style with a particularly fine collection of Victorian and Edwardian fittings and stained glass".

The church is built of stone with tile roofs. It has a cruciform plan, consisting of a nave with a clerestory, north and south aisles, a west baptistry, a south porch, north and south transepts, a chancel with flanking vestries, and a broad tower at the crossing. The tower has three two-light bell openings on each side and an embattled parapet. At the west end is a large six-light window and octagonal corner turrets with short spires, and the east window has seven lights. Inside, the chancel has stencilled decorations on the wall and there is a stone sedilia. The wooden roof is panelled and has bosses, the part in the chancel being painted and gilded. The high altar and reredos are particularly elaborate and are also painted and gilded. There is a wooden bishop's throne, carved in 1908, and the original wooden altar rail and choir stalls. There is a war memorial in the form of a triptych, and extensive stained glass, mostly by Charles Eamer Kempe, with two windows designed by Harry Harvey.

== See also ==
- Grade II* listed churches in North Yorkshire (district)
- Listed buildings in Whitby (central area - west)
