= Hugh Edwin Strickland =

English geologist, ornithologist, naturalist and systematist

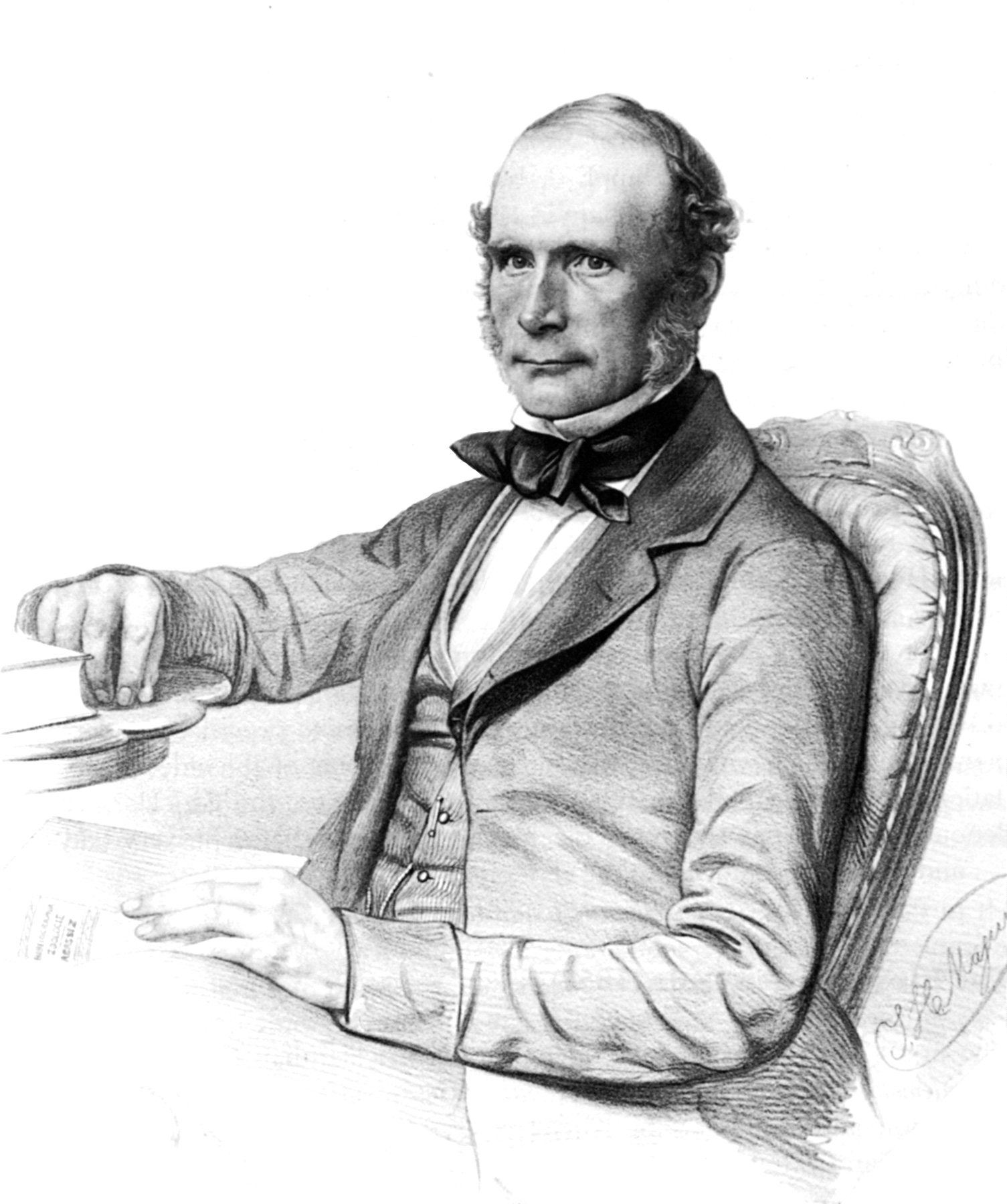
- Born: 2 March 1811; Reighton, East Riding of Yorkshire, England
- Died: 14 September 1853 (aged 42)
- Citizenship: Britain
- Scientific career
- Fields: Geology; Ornithology; Natural history Systematics

Hugh Edwin Strickland (2 March 1811 – 14 September 1853) was an English geologist, ornithologist, naturalist and systematist. Through the British Association, he proposed a series of rules for the nomenclature of organisms in zoology, known as the Strickland Code, that was a precursor of later codes for nomenclature.

== Biography ==
Strickland was born at Reighton, in the East Riding of Yorkshire. He was the second son of Henry Eustatius Strickland of Apperley, Gloucestershire, by his wife Mary, daughter of Edmund Cartwright, inventor of the power loom, and grandson of Sir George Strickland, bart., of Boynton. In 1827 he was sent as a pupil to Thomas Arnold (1795–1842), a family friend.

As a boy he acquired a taste for natural history which dominated his life. He received his early education from private tutors and in 1829 entered Oriel College, Oxford. He attended the anatomical lectures of John Kidd and the geological lectures of William Buckland and he became interested both in zoology and geology. He graduated B.A. in 1831, and proceeded to M.A. in the following year. He married Catherine Dorcas Maule Jardine, the daughter of Sir William Jardine, in 1845. She drew many of the illustrations for Illustrations to Ornithology (1825–1843), using her initials, CDMS (her sister Helen was also an illustrator).

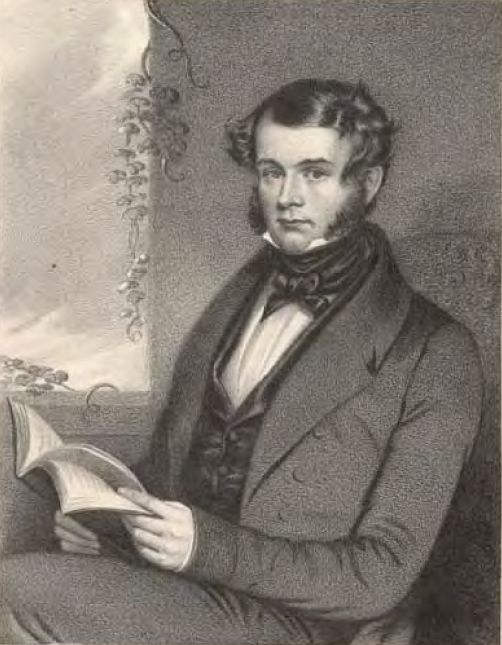
Strickland at age 26

Returning to his home at Cracombe House, near Tewkesbury, he began to study the geology of the Vale of Evesham, communicating papers to the Geological Society of London (1833–1834). He also gave much attention to ornithology. Becoming acquainted with Roderick Murchison he was introduced to William Hamilton (1805–1867) and accompanied him in 1835 on a journey through Asia Minor, the Thracian Bosporus and the island of Zante. Hamilton afterwards published the results of this journey and of his subsequent excursion to Armenia in Researches in Asia Minor, Pontus and Armenia (1842).

After his return in 1836 Strickland brought before the Geological Society several papers on the geology of the districts he had visited in southern Europe and Asia. He also described in detail the "drift deposits in the counties of Worcester and Warwick, drawing particular attention to the fluviatile deposits of Cropthorne in which remains of hippopotamus, &c., were found". With Murchison he read before the Geological Society an important paper On the Upper Formations of the New Red Sandstone System in Gloucestershire, Worcestershire and Warwickshire (Trans. Geol. Soc., 1840). In other papers he described the Bristol Bone-bed near Tewkesbury and the Ludlow Bone-bed of Woolhope. He was author likewise of ornithological memoirs communicated to the Zoological Society, the Annals and Magazine of Natural History and the British Association.

He drew up the report, in 1842, of a committee appointed by the British Association to consider the rules of zoological nomenclature. This report is the earliest formal codification of the principle of priority, which represents the fundamental guiding precept that preserves the stability of zoological nomenclature. It became known as the "Strickland Code". The code took the twelfth edition of Carl Linnaeus's Systema Naturae, published in 1766, as the starting point.

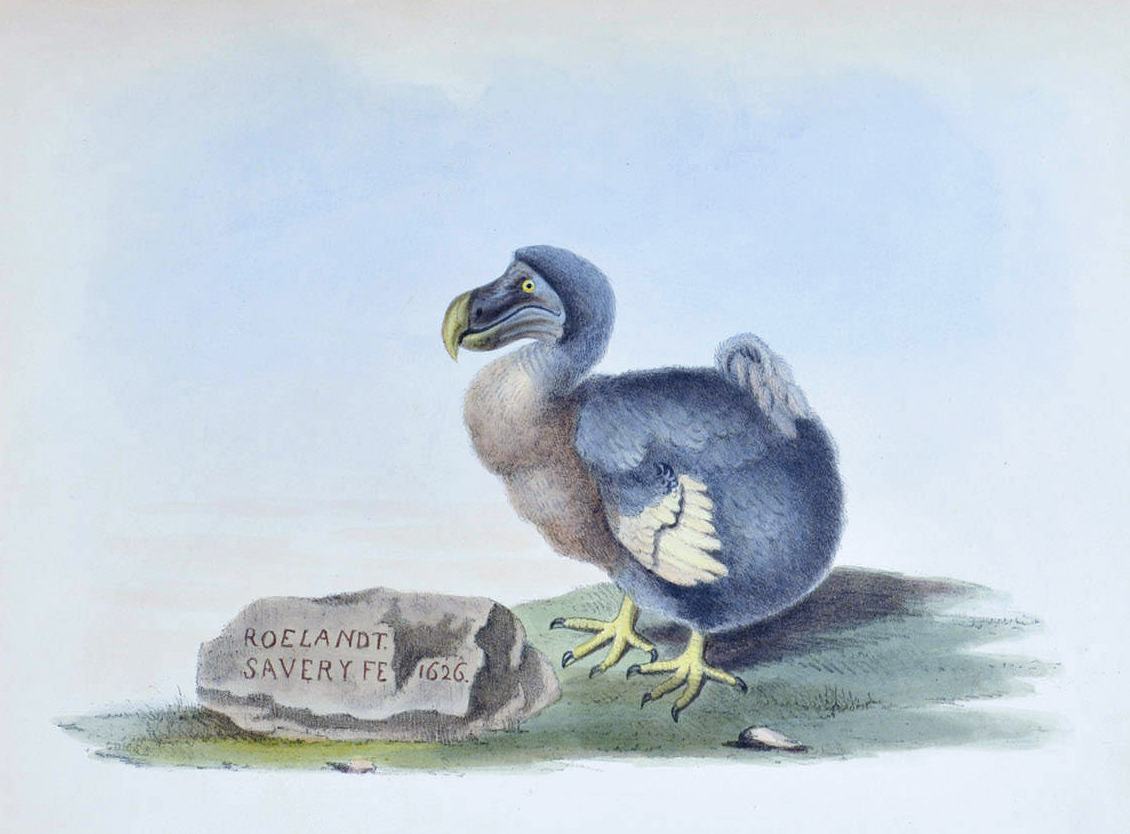
Frontispiece of Strickland's 1848 book 'The Dodo and Its Kindred; or the History, Affinities, and Osteology of the Dodo, Solitaire, and Other Extinct Birds of the Islands Mauritius, Rodriguez, and Bourbon'

He was one of the founders of the Ray Society, suggested in 1843 and established in 1844, the object being the publication of works on natural history which could not be undertaken by scientific societies or by publishers. For this society Strickland corrected, enlarged and edited the manuscript of Agassiz for the Bibliographia Zoologiae et Geologiae (1848). In 1845 he edited with J. Buckman a second and enlarged edition of Murchison's Outline of the Geology of the neighbourhood of Cheltenham. In 1846 he settled at Oxford, and two years later he issued in conjunction with Alexander Gordon Melville a work on The Dodo and its kindred (1848).

In 1850 he was appointed deputy reader in geology at Oxford during the illness of Buckland, and in 1852 he was elected Fellow of the Royal Society. In the following year, after attending the meeting of the British Association at Hull, he went to examine the geological strata visible in cuttings on the Manchester Sheffield & Lincolnshire Railway near Retford. There he was knocked down and killed by a train; on a double track he stepped out of the way of a goods train and was hit by an express coming in the opposite direction. He was buried at Deerhurst church near Tewkesbury, where a memorial window was erected.

His Ornithological Synonyms was published in 1855. His collection of 6,000 birds went to Cambridge in 1867. While travelling in 1835 he discovered the olive-tree warbler on the island of Zante, and the cinereous bunting in the vicinity of İzmir in western Turkey.

His name was honoured in the name of a bird endemic to N. Borneo, Copsychus stricklandii Motley & Dillwyn (1855) as well as the brachiopod genus Stricklandia.
