= Brunswick Methodist Church =

Building in Whitby, North Yorkshire, England

Coordinates: 54.4858°N 0.6165°W

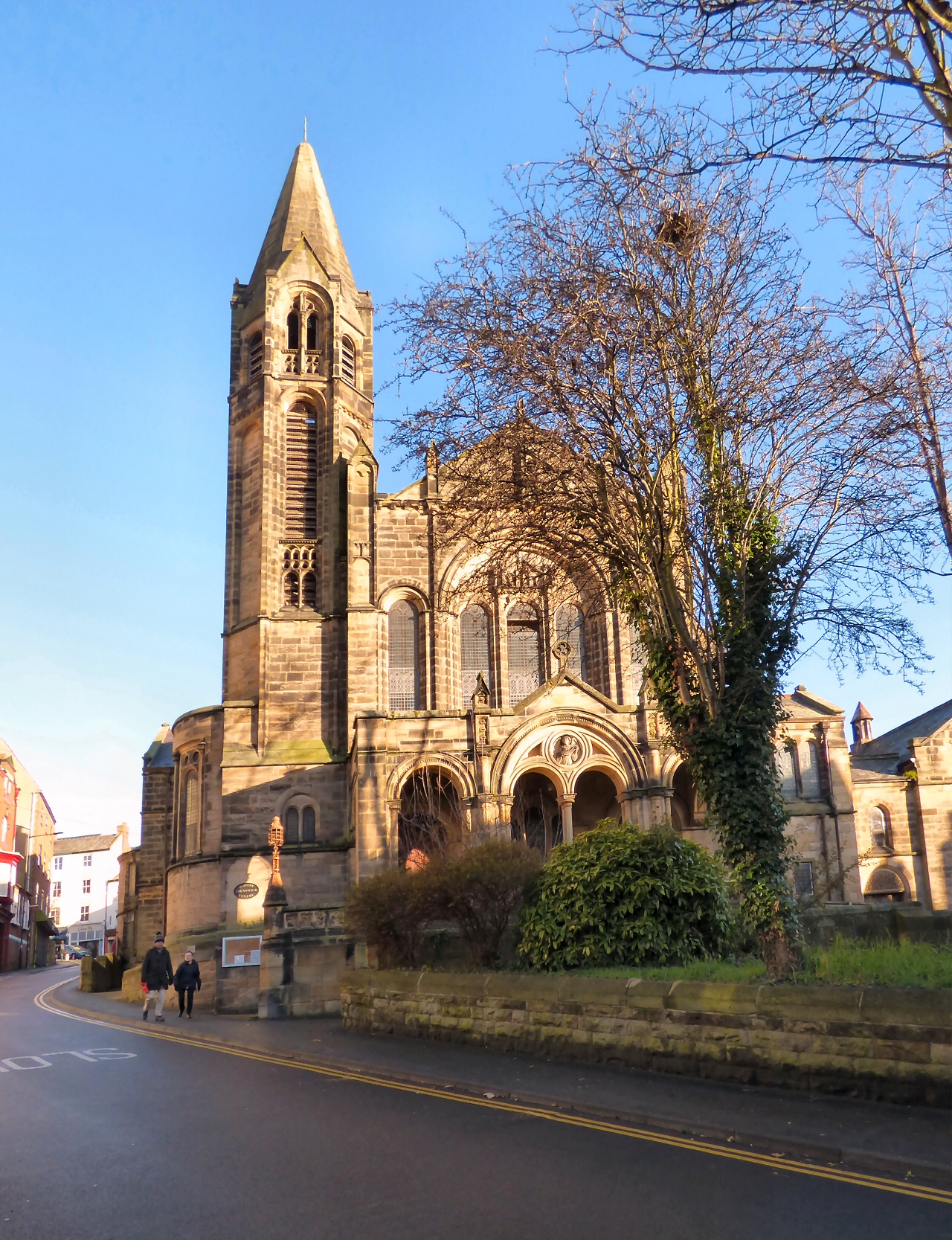
The building, in 2018

Brunswick Methodist Church is a former chapel in Whitby, a town in North Yorkshire, in England.

Methodists were worshipping in Whitby by 1750, and the Wesley Chapel on Church Street was opened by John Wesley in 1788. In 1814, the Brunswick Chapel was constructed in the West Cliff area. It could seat 900 worshippers, and soon grew to have a larger congregation than the Wesley Chapel. By the late 19th century, it was not large enough to accommodate tourists visiting the town during the summer. Between 1890 and 1891, a new church was built on the site, with attached meeting rooms. It was designed by Waddington and Son in the free Romanesque style. The building was grade II* listed in 1994. The church closed in 1997, and was converted into the Brunswick Centre, a members' club. In 2025, it became Eighteen91, a live entertainment venue. It regularly hosts part of the Bizarre Bazaar market during the Whitby Goth Weekend.

The former church is built of stone with a slate roof, and consists of a nave, a west porch, transepts and a northwest tower. On the west front, steps lead up to a porch with three round arches, the middle one with a central pair of columns and a gable. Above it is a large round arch with three round-headed windows, flanked by taller windows, above which is a gable. The tower is octagonal and has a projecting bow window. The bell openings are round-headed, and above them are two round-headed openings with a gable, and a squat spire. The interiors of the attached Brunswick and Pannet rooms have faience tile decoration.

== See also ==
- Grade II* listed churches in North Yorkshire (district)
- Listed buildings in Whitby (central area - west)
