= All Saints' Church, Hunmanby =

Church in Hunmanby, North Yorkshire, England

Coordinates: 54°10′53″N 0°19′21″W

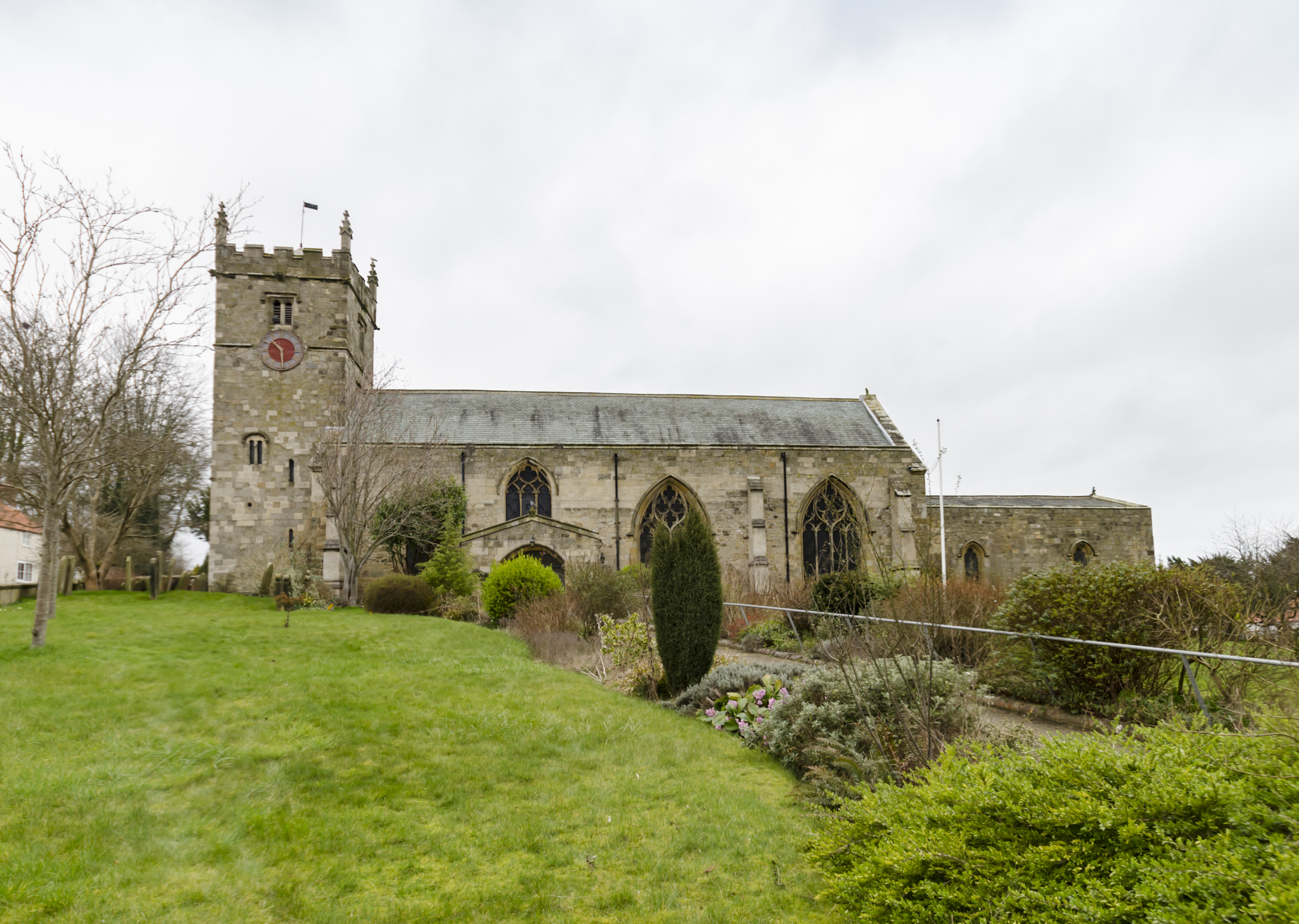
The church, in 2017

All Saints' Church is the parish church of Hunmanby, a village in North Yorkshire, in England.

The church was built in the late 11th century, and was recorded in the Domesday Book. Parts of the nave and chancel survive from this period. The tower was added in the 12th century, and a north aisle in the 13th century. In the 15th century, the top stage of the tower was added, followed in the 18th century by the porch, at which time the chancel was partly rebuilt. The church was restored in 1845, when all the windows other than those in the tower were replaced, the north wall was rebuilt, and the interior was refitted. The building was grade II* listed in 1966.

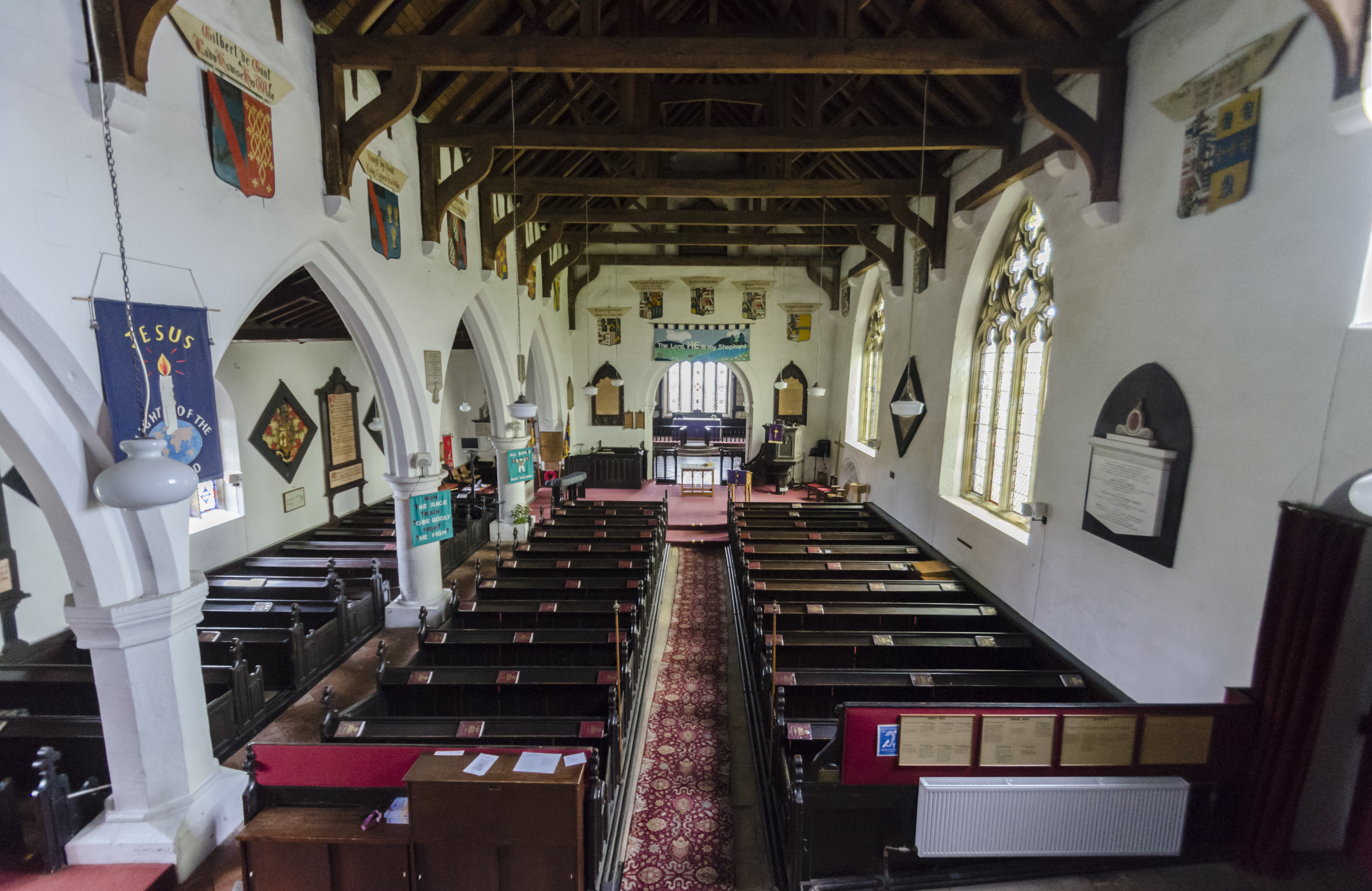
View from the nave into the chancel

The church is built of sandstone with a tile roof, and consists of a nave, a north aisle, a south porch, a chancel and a west tower. The tower is unbuttressed and has three stages. In the lowest stage are slit windows, the middle stage contains a two-light window with a rounded hood mould, the bell openings have two lights and a square hood mould, on the south front is a clock face, and at the top is an embattled parapet with crocketed corner pinnacles. The porch is cobbled, and has a round-arched doorway with a tympanum containing a Maltese cross. Inside the church, various fragments of crosses and a Saxon crosshead have been incorporated into the north wall. There is a broken Norman font, a chained Bible dating from 1541, and a couple of monuments dating from the 1770s.

== See also ==
- Grade II* listed churches in North Yorkshire (district)
- Listed buildings in Hunmanby
