= Haggersgate House =

Building in Whitby, North Yorkshire, England

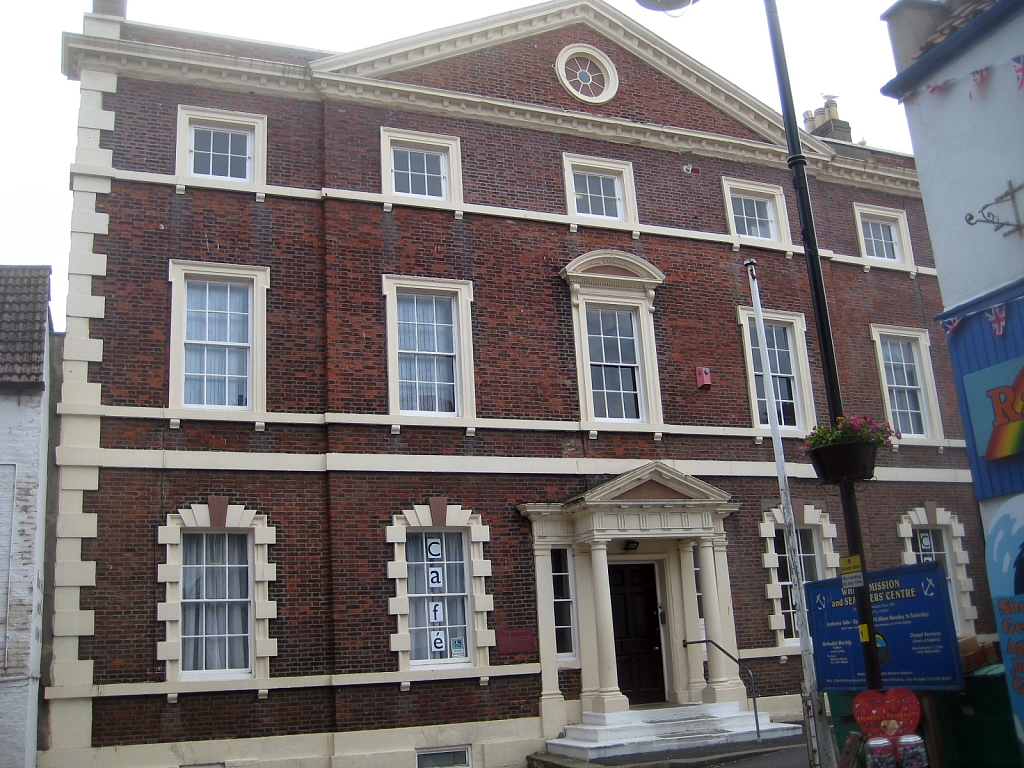
- The building in 2011

- Location within North Yorkshire
- Alternative names: Whitby Mission and Seafarers' Centre

General information
- Location: Haggersgate, Whitby, North Yorkshire, England
- Coordinates: 54°29′15″N 0°36′53″W
- Year built: 1760
- Client: John Yeoman

Listed Building – Grade II*
- Official name: The Missions to Seaman
- Designated: 23 February 1954
- Reference no.: 1316432

Haggersgate House, also known as the Whitby Mission and Seafarers' Centre, is a historic building on Haggersgate in Whitby, a town in North Yorkshire, England.

The house was built in 1760, for the shipowner John Yeoman, and was described as the "best brick house in town". In 1877, it was converted into a seamen's mission. A chapel was created, and painted by W. Lawson. Some of the internal furnishings were sold after the Second World War. The building was Grade II* listed in 1954.

The building is constructed of brick on a plinth, the basement rendered, with stone dressings, quoins, floor and sill bands, and a dentilled cornice, There are three storeys and a basement, and five bays, the middle three bays projecting under a dentilled pediment containing an oculus. Projecting from the centre is a porch with Doric columns, an entablature with mutules and guttae, and a dentilled pediment. The windows are sashes, those on the ground floor with Gibbs surrounds and triple keystones. The windows on the upper floors have architraves, those on the middle floor eared, and the central window on the middle floor has a segmental dentilled pediment and a brick apron. Inside, the original main and secondary staircases survive, and the chapel has early panelling.

== See also ==
- Grade II* listed churches in North Yorkshire (district)
- Listed buildings in Whitby (central area - west)
