= St Michael's Church, Malton =

Church in Malton, North Yorkshire, England

Coordinates: 54°08′07″N 0°47′57″W

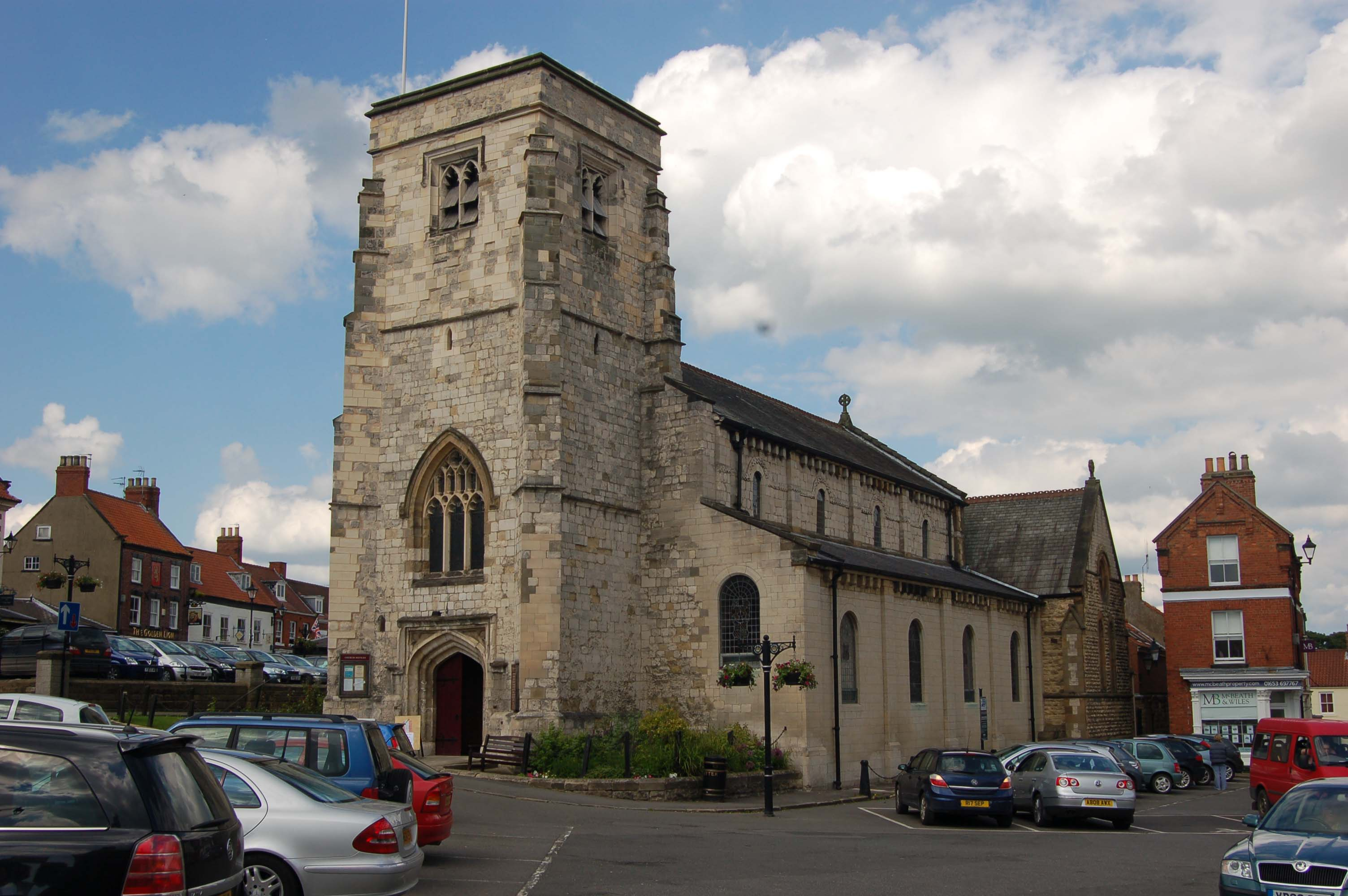
The church, in 2012

St Michael's Church is the parish church of Malton, North Yorkshire, a town in England.

The church was built in about 1150, from which period much of the nave survives. The tower was added in the 15th century, at which time the nave was slightly shortened. The chancel was rebuilt in 1858, then in 1883 under George Fowler Jones the south arcade and east end of the nave were rebuilt, two galleries were removed, and transepts were added. In 1966 the south side of the church was rebuilt, and in about 1986 the north aisle roof was replaced. The building has been grade II* listed since 1951.

The church is built of sandstone with a slate roof, and consists of a nave with a clerestory, north and south aisles, north and south transepts, a chancel with a north vestry and organ chamber and a south chapel, and a west tower. The tower has three stages, angle buttresses, a chamfered plinth, and moulded string courses. On the west side is a doorway with a moulded surround, a four-centred arch and a hood mould, and above it is a Perpendicular window. The bell openings have pointed cusped openings and hood moulds, and above is a plain parapet. Inside, there is a 17th-century font, and there is a 20th-century screen between the nave and the south chapel.

== See also ==
- Grade II* listed churches in North Yorkshire (district)
- Listed buildings in Malton, North Yorkshire (central area)
