= St Andrew's United Reformed Church, Scarborough =

Church in Scarborough, North Yorkshire, England

Coordinates: 54°16′30″N 0°24′10″W

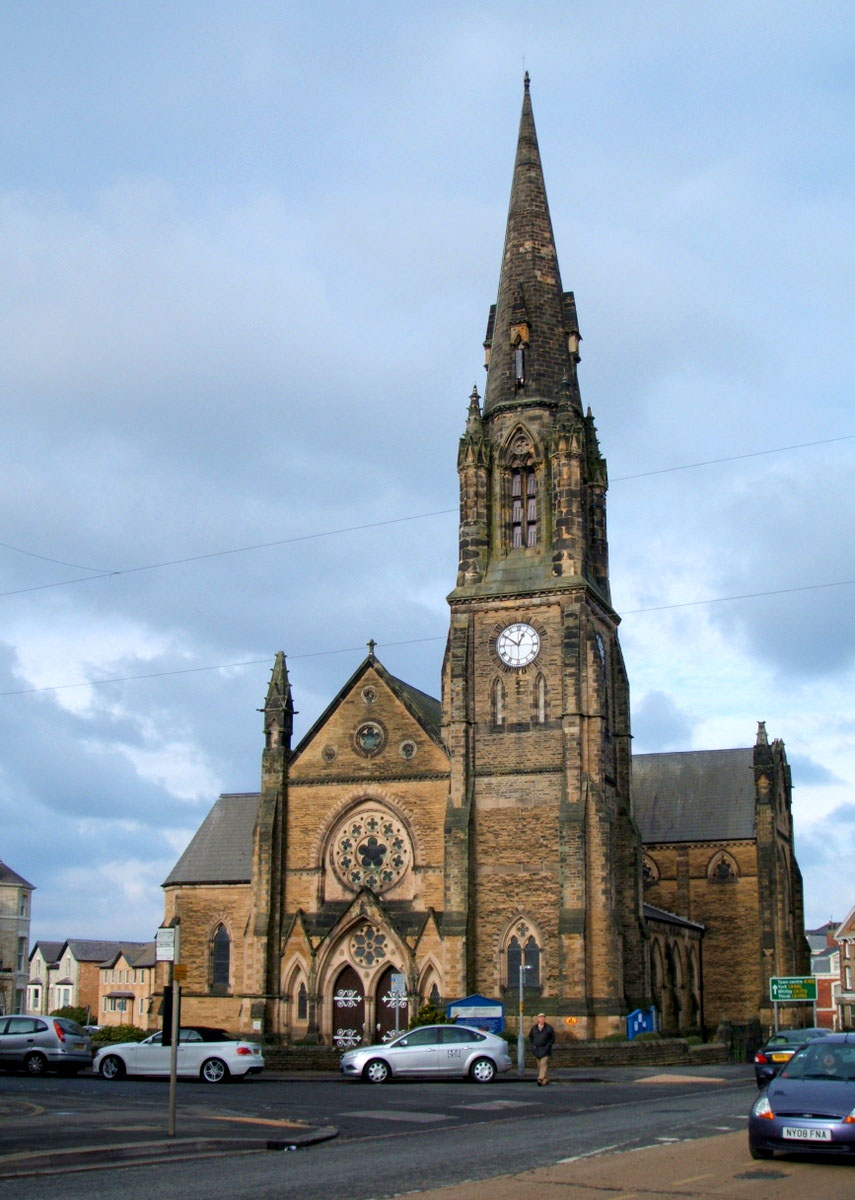
The building, in 2017

St Andrew's United Reformed Church is a church in Scarborough, North Yorkshire, a town in England.

The church was constructed for the Congregational Union of England and Wales, its third church in the town after ones on Eastborough and Westborough, and is now part of the United Reformed Church. It was built between 1864 and 1868, to a design by Henry Francis Lockwood and William Mawson, the funding coming from Titus Salt. It is in a 13th-century Gothic revival style, and is described by Nikolaus Pevsner as being "as spectacular as any Scarborough church". The building was grade II listed in 1973, and upgraded to grade II* in 1993.

The church is built of stone. It consists of a nave with a clerestory, north and south transepts, a chancel, a southwest steeple, and a northwest apse. The steeple has a two-stage tower with buttresses and clock faces, on which are four crocketted pinnacles and a spire, and at the north end is a rose window. The base of the spire is unusual, with a partly-open passage.

== See also ==
- Grade II* listed churches in North Yorkshire (district)
- Listed buildings in Scarborough (Ramshill Ward)
