= Listed buildings in Reighton =

Reighton is a civil parish in the county of North Yorkshire, England. It contains twelve listed buildings that are recorded in the National Heritage List for England. Of these, two are listed at Grade II*, the middle of the three grades, and the others are at Grade II, the lowest grade. The parish contains the villages of Reighton and Speeton and the surrounding countryside. The listed buildings consist of two churches, houses and associated structures, farmhouses and farm buildings.

== Key ==
Grade	Criteria
II*	Particularly important buildings of more than special interest
II	Buildings of national importance and special interest

== Buildings ==
Name and location	Photograph	Date	Notes	Grade
St Leonard's Church, Speeton; 54.15523°N 0.23844°W		Early 12th century	The church has been altered through the centuries, including restorations in the 20th century. It is built in sandstone, on a plinth, and has a pantile roof. The church consists of a nave, a chancel and a west tower. The tower is stepped, it has three stages, it contains round-headed bell openings, and has a swept pyramidal roof. Inside, there is a plain Norman chancel arch.	II*
St Peter's Church; 54.16042°N 0.26954°W		12th century	The church has been altered and extended through the centuries, and the exterior was largely rebuilt between 1897 and 1905. It is built in sandstone, and has a roof partly of tile and partly of slate. The church consists of a nave, a north aisle, a south porch, a chancel and a west tower. The tower has two stages, with diagonal buttresses, two-light bell openings, and a coped parapet. The porch has a round-arched opening, and the south door has Norman jambs.	II*
Johnson's Farmhouse; 54.16271°N 0.26959°W	—	Early 18th century	The farmhouse is in red brick on the front and sides, and in chalk at the rear, and has a pantile roof with coped tumbled brick gables. There is one storey, three bays, and a rear outshut. On the front is a doorway and horizontally sliding sash windows, all with flat arches of gauged brick, and in the attics are flat-headed dormers.	II
Dovecote, Reighton Hall; 54.15821°N 0.26287°W	—	Early 18th century	The dovecote is in red brick, with modillion eaves and a pointed pantile roof. There are two storeys and a hexagonal plan. It contains a door flanked by ventilation grills, with dove holes and a landing platform to the right. All the openings have segmental arches of gauged brick.	II
Reighton Hall; 54.15805°N 0.26346°W	—	1730–40	The house, which was remodelled in 1810, is in chalk faced in brick, and the south front is rendered. There are two storeys and six bays. On the front is a semicircular porch with Doric columns and a modillion cornice. The windows are sashes with wedge lintels. At the rear is a canted bay window and a round-headed stair window.	II
1 and 2 Watson's Lane; 54.16320°N 0.27144°W		Mid to late 18th century	A house, later divided into two, in chalk, with brick quoins, a brick eaves course, and a pantile roof. There is one storey and an attic, and three bays. The original doorway is under a segmental brick arch, and to the left is an inserted door. There is one casement window, the other windows are horizontally sliding sashes, and at the right end is a raking half-dormer.	II
Manor Farmhouse and outbuilding 54.16281°N 0.27132°W		Late 18th century	The farmhouse is in chalk, with brick quoins and gables, and a slate roof. There are two storeys and three bays, and a rear extension. In the centre is a doorway with pilasters and a cornice, and the windows are sashes with wedge lintels and keystones. To the right is a single-storey outbuilding in brick containing a round-headed doorway, a window opening and a segmental-headed cart opening.	II
Manor Farmhouse, Speeton; 54.15399°N 0.23809°W	—	Late 18th century	The farmhouse, with a cottage later incorporated, is in whitewashed rendered chalk, and the extension to the left is in whitewashed brick, rendered on the sides and rear. There is a pantile roof, two storeys and five bays. On the front is a doorway in a timber gabled porch, and the windows are sashes, those in the ground floor with segmental arches of gauged brick.	II
The Old Vicarage (northwest); 54.15981°N 0.26914°W	—	c. 1825	The vicarage, later a private house, is in red brick with an extension in chalk, a string course, and a pantile roof with coped gables. There are two storeys, three bays, and a rear extension. The central doorway has a fanlight with Gothic glazing. The windows are sashes with wedge lintels on the ground floor, and gauged flat brick arches on the upper floor.	II
Beech Cottage; 54.16271°N 0.26940°W	—	Early 19th century	The house is in chequerboard brick on the front, and is rendered on the sides and rear. It has a modillion eaves course, and a pantile roof with coped gables. There are two storeys and two bays, and a rear extension. In the centre is a doorway with a moulded surround with paterae, and a divided fanlight. To the right is a French window, and the other windows are sashes; all the windows have wedge lintels.	II
Stable block, Reighton Hall; 54.15830°N 0.26311°W	—	Early 19th century	The stables and coach house are in red brick on the front and in chalk on the sides, and have modillion eaves and hipped pantile roofs. The block consists of a central two-storey bay flanked by single-storey wings. In the centre is an elliptical-headed coach entrance, above which is a pitching door to the hayloft above. In the left wing is a semicircular-arched doorway flanked by sash windows, and the right wing contains garage doors.	II
The Old Vicarage (southeast); 54.15975°N 0.26901°W	—	c. 1840	A school, later a private house, it is in red brick, with a string course and a pantile roof. There are two storeys and two bays, and a rear extension. The doorway is in the centre, and the windows are sashes, those in the upper floor with gauged brick flat arches.	II
