= Christ Church, Skipton =

Church in Skipton, North Yorkshire, England

Coordinates: 53.9581°N 2.0194°W

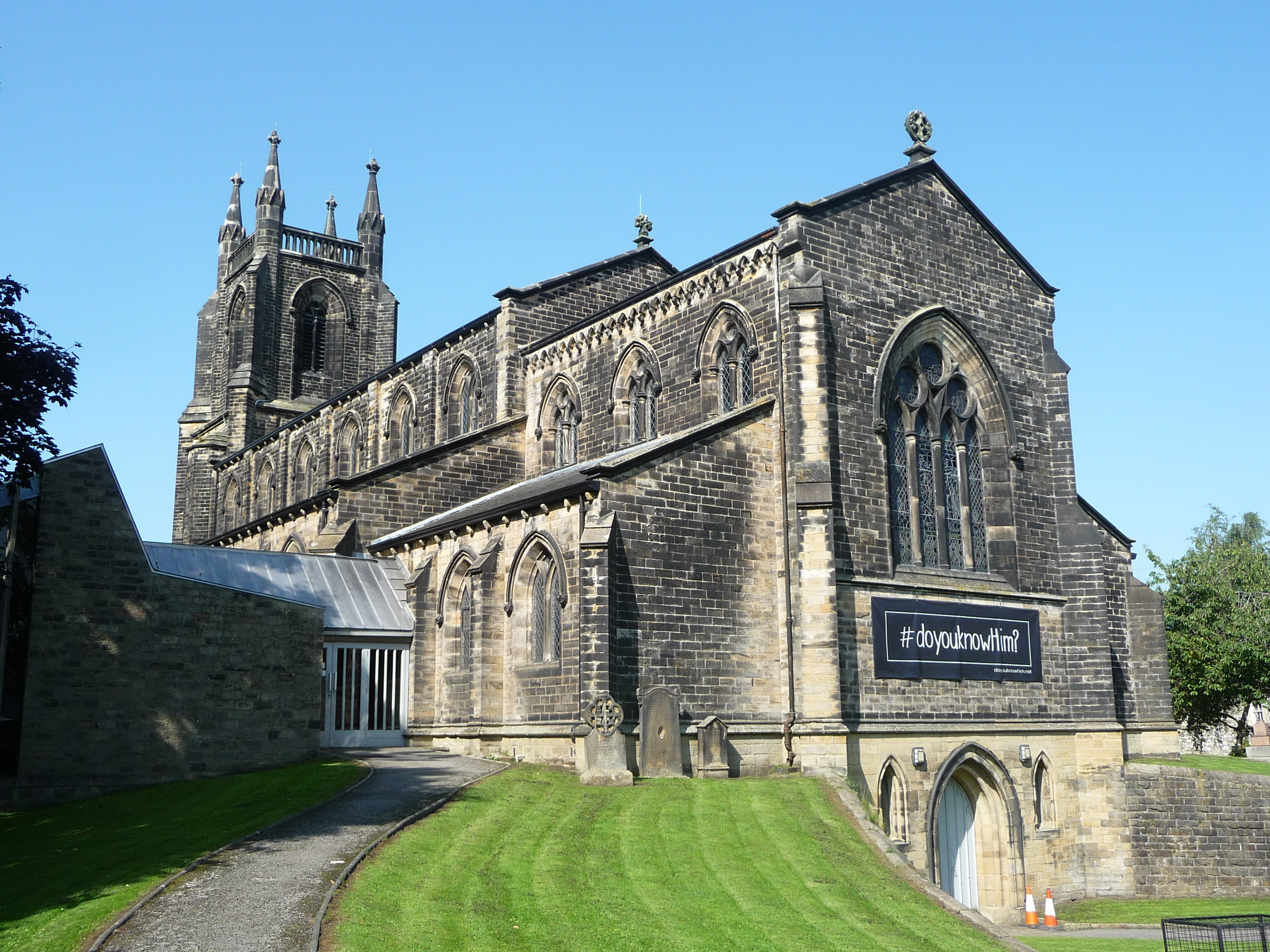
The church, in 2018

Christ Church is an Anglican parish church in Skipton, a town in North Yorkshire, in England.

The church was built between 1837 and 1839, to a design by Robert Dennis Chantrell, at a cost of £6,260 5s. 4d. In January 1839, a storm damaged the roof and blew in the west windows, but they were repaired in time for the consecration in September. In 1840, it was given a parish, split from that of Holy Trinity Church, Skipton. A parsonage was added nearby in 1846, and stained glass windows were installed between 1844 and 1854. An organ was installed in 1905, which was constructed by Harrison & Harrison. The building has been grade II* listed since 1978. Parish rooms were added on the south side in 1982, and in 2010, the building was renovated at a cost of £140,000, the work including the removal of the pews and the installation of a semi-sprung floor with underfloor heating.

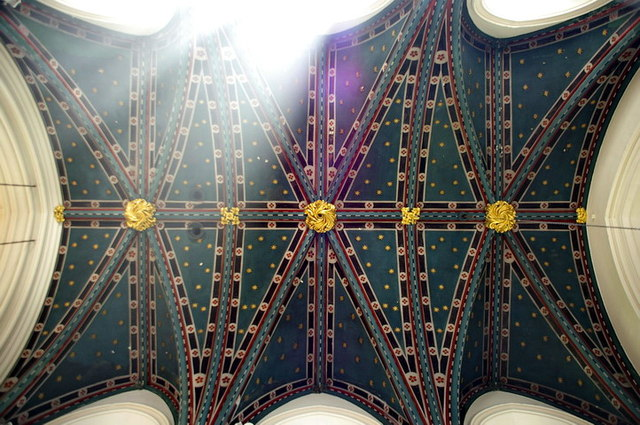
The painted ceiling

The church is built of sandstone and freestone with a slate roof. It consists of a nave with a clerestory, north and south aisles, a chancel with a clerestory, aisles and a crypt, and a west tower. The tower has two stages, diagonal buttresses rising to corner pinnacles, and an open arcaded parapet. On the west side is a doorway with a pointed arch, above it is a large three-light window, and the bell openings have two lights and louvres. Inside, the nave, aisles and chancel have plaster rib vaults, that in the chancel is painted and gilded, perhaps by Charles Nicholson in the 1920s. Nicholson also created the south chapel. There is a Gothic reredos, designed by Robert Thompson.

== See also ==
- Grade II* listed churches in North Yorkshire (district)
- Listed buildings in Skipton
