= Arthur Gwyther =

The Venerable Arthur Gwyther M.A.
- Born: 23 February 1850; Fewston
- Died: 21 February 1921 (aged 70); Bournemouth
- Education: St John's College, Cambridge
- Occupation: Anglican priest
- Title: Archdeacon of Demerara
- Term: 1896-1919

The Ven. Arthur Gwyther (Fewston 23 February 1850 – Bournemouth 21 February 1921) was an Anglican priest in the Caribbean in the late 19th and early 20th centuries.

Gwyther was educated at St John's College, Cambridge. He was ordained in 1875. After a curacy in Weybridge he went out to Guyana. He held incumbencies in Wakenaam, Essequibo and Georgetown. He was Archdeacon of Demerara from 1896 to 1919.
