= St Leonard's Church, Speeton =

Church in Speeton, North Yorkshire, England

Coordinates: 54°09′19″N 0°14′18″W

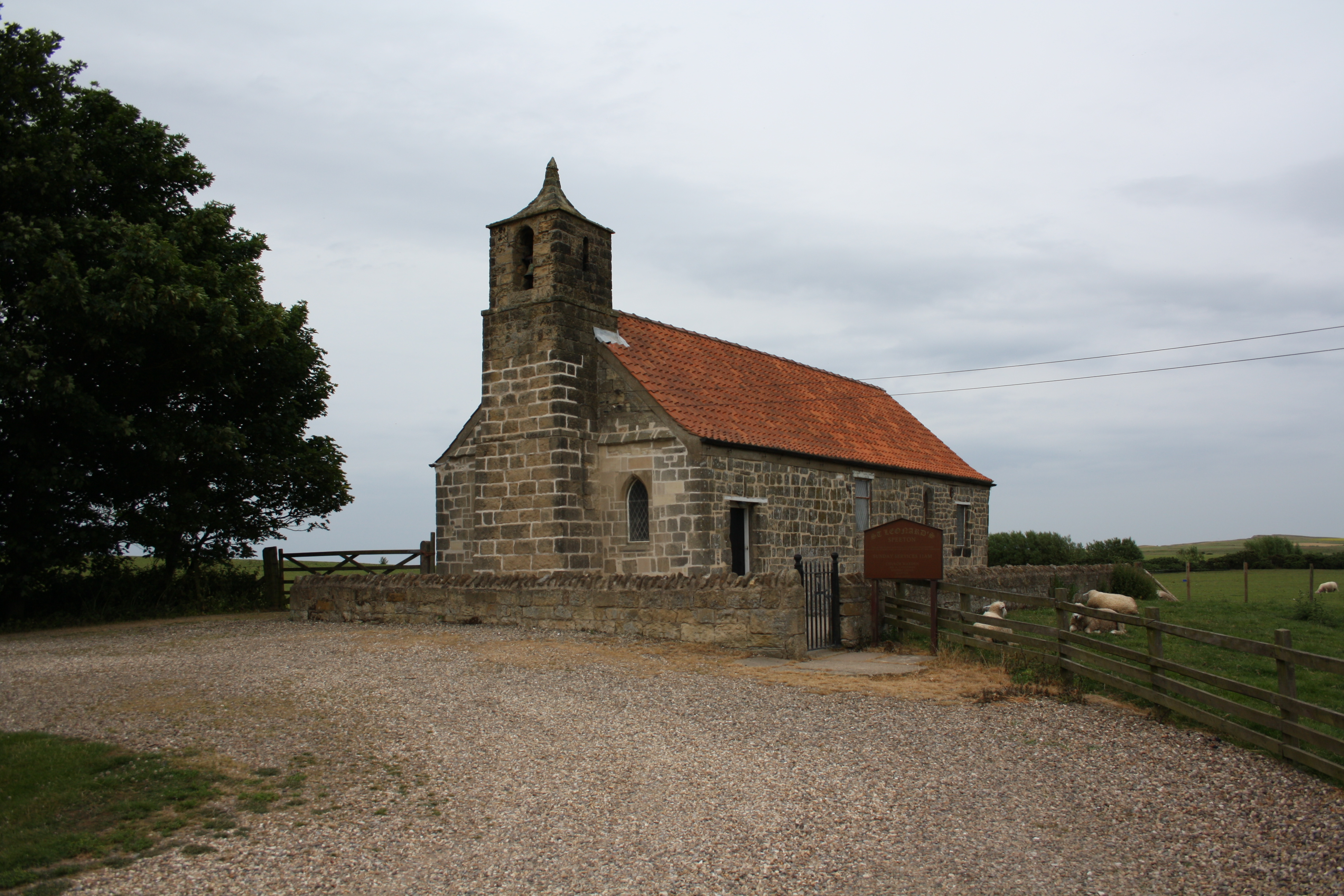
The church, in 2010

St Leonard's Church is an Anglican church in Speeton, a village in North Yorkshire, in England.

The church was built in the early 12th century. Nikolaus Pevsner described it as "the simplest of buildings", and for centuries it only had windows in the south wall. The church was restored in 1905 and 1911, the work adding windows to the west wall, and again restored in 1976. It was grade II* listed in 1966.

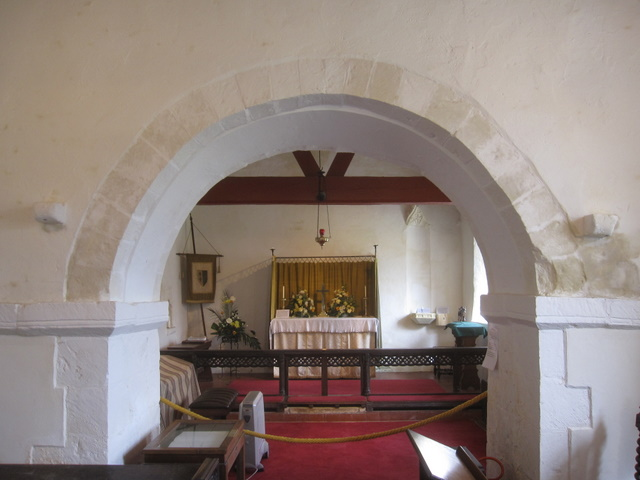
The chancel

The church is built of sandstone, on a plinth, and has a pantile roof. The church consists of a nave, a chancel and a west tower. The tower is stepped, it has three stages, it contains round-headed bell openings, and has a swept pyramidal roof. Inside, there is a plain Norman chancel arch. The nave measures 4.5m by 6.8m, and the chancel is about half the size. There is an empty statue niche, an alms box, two piscinae, and a simple Norman tub font. In the north wall, there are two reset fragments of carved stone, probably both early 12th century.

== See also ==
- Grade II* listed churches in North Yorkshire (district)
- Listed buildings in Reighton
