= Airy Hill, Whitby =

Historic building in North Yorkshire, England

Airy Hill
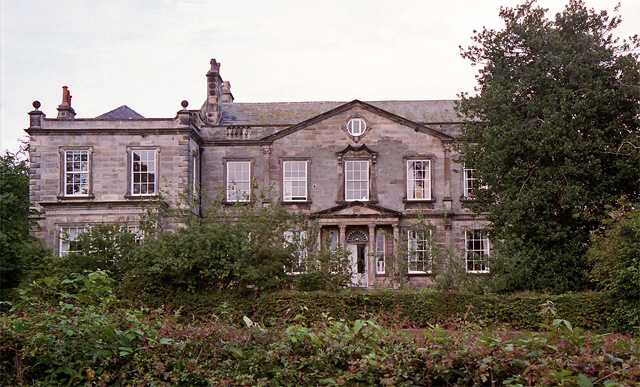
- The house in 2002

- Location within North Yorkshire
- Alternative names: St Columban's

General information
- Location: Waterstead Lane, Whitby, North Yorkshire, England
- Coordinates: 54°28′48″N 0°37′11″W
- Year built: 1790
- Renovated: 19th century (added)
- Client: Richard Moorson

Listed Building – Grade II*
- Official name: St Columbans
- Designated: 23 February 1954
- Reference no.: 1254352

Airy Hill, also known as St Columban's, is a historic building on Waterstead Lane in Whitby, a town in North Yorkshire, England.

The area was known in the Viking period as "Ergum Hill", which was gradually corrupted to "Airy Hill". The current house was built in 1790 for Richard Moorson, replacing an earlier building. A local myth claims that it is linked by a tunnel to Whitby's harbour. One ground floor room was for a time used as a magistrates' court. A porch was added in the 19th century. The building was Grade II* listed in 1954.

The house is built of stone with quoins, and consists of a main block with two storeys and five bays, linked by curved walls to single-storey pavilions. The main block has a pediment over the middle three bays containing an oval window, flanked by open balustrades and vases in niches. The block has Tuscan attached columns between bays on the ground floor, and pilasters above. In the centre is a projecting porch with Doric columns and an entablature. The door has curved reveals and an openwork parapet. Above the porch is a Venetian window with Ionic columns and a rusticated surround. The windows have architraves, those in the ground floor with rusticated surrounds and triple keystones. The pavilions have Venetian windows and pyramidal roofs with ball finials. At the rear is a pedimented Corinthian portico. Inside the house, numerous original features survive, including the staircase and doors, drawing room fireplace in the Adam style, and mahogany bookcases.

== See also ==
- Grade II* listed buildings in North Yorkshire (district)
- Listed buildings in Whitby (outer areas)
