= Thrintoft =

Village and civil parish in North Yorkshire, England

Coordinates: 54°19′55″N 1°30′32″W

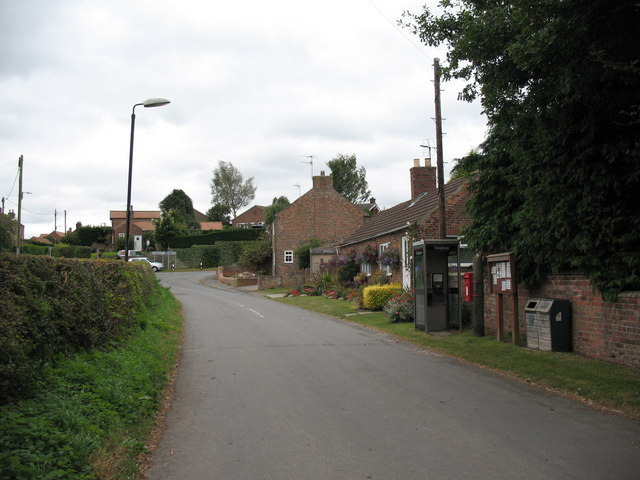
- Village street, Thrintoft

- Location within North Yorkshire
- Population: 185 (Including Little Langton. 2011 census)
- OS grid reference: SE320931
- Unitary authority: North Yorkshire
- Ceremonial county: North Yorkshire
- Region: Yorkshire and the Humber
- Country: England
- Sovereign state: United Kingdom
- Post town: Northallerton
- Postcode district: DL7
- Police: North Yorkshire
- Fire: North Yorkshire
- Ambulance: Yorkshire

Thrintoft is a village and civil parish in the county of North Yorkshire, England. It is situated close to the River Swale, 3 miles (5 km) west of Northallerton.

Thrintoft is mentioned in the Domesday Book as being in the possession of Picot of Lascelles. One of his descendants, Roger de Lascelles, gifted the village to St Mary's Abbey in York around 1146. The name derives from Old Norse and is registered in the Domesday Book as Tirnetofte. It is believed to mean the thorn-bush by (or in) the field.

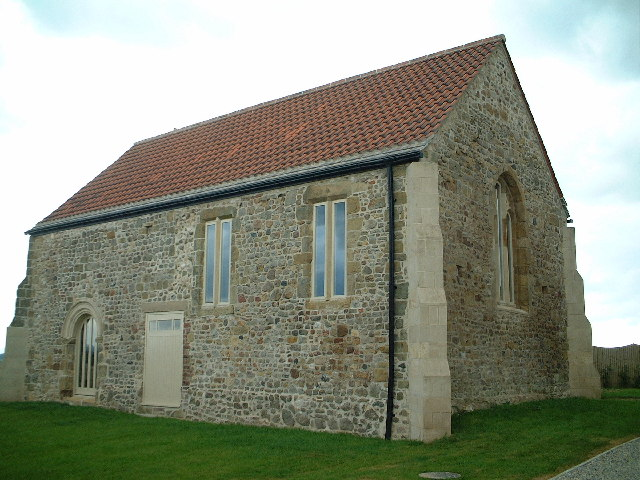
Chapel of Saint Mary Magdalen

Historically in the parish of Ainderby Steeple, which lies 1-mile (1.6 km) to the south, it became its own parish in 1866 and now contains the hamlet of Little Langton. From 1974 to 2023 it was part of the Hambleton District, it is now administered by the unitary North Yorkshire Council.

Whilst the parish has a population of 185, North Yorkshire County Council estimated that the population of the village was 140 at the 2011 census and remained at that number in 2015.

The village is recorded as having a corn mill in 1539, which led to the stream flowing south west through the settlement into the River Swale being named Mill Beck. The chapel of St Mary Magdalen, now a house, was built during the 13th to 15th centuries. It was endowed in 1253 as a chantry chapel connected to Jervaulx Abbey and is a grade II* listed building. The chapel is the only surviving building from Thrintoft Grange.

The village has a pub, The New Inn.
