= Speeton =

Village in North Yorkshire, England

Coordinates: 54°09′17″N 0°14′25″W

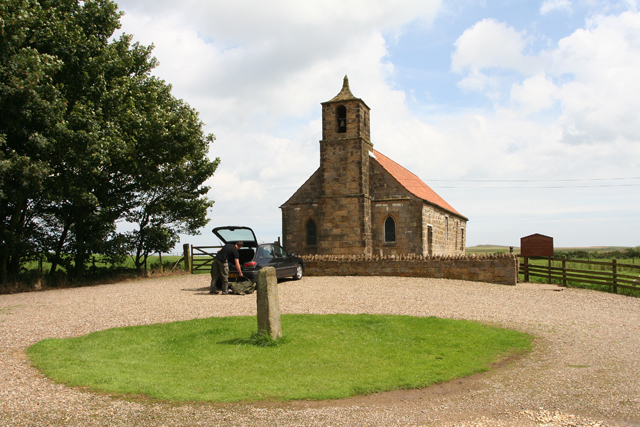
- St Leonards Church

- Location within North Yorkshire
- OS grid reference: TA150746
- Civil parish: Reighton
- Unitary authority: North Yorkshire
- Ceremonial county: North Yorkshire
- Region: Yorkshire and the Humber
- Country: England
- Sovereign state: United Kingdom
- Post town: FILEY
- Postcode district: YO14
- Dialling code: 01723
- Police: North Yorkshire
- Fire: North Yorkshire
- Ambulance: Yorkshire
- UK Parliament: Thirsk and Malton

Speeton is a village in the civil parish of Reighton, in North Yorkshire, England. It lies near the edge of the coastal cliffs midway between Filey and Bridlington. It is North Yorkshire's easternmost settlement, but historically lay in the East Riding of Yorkshire until local government re-organisation in 1974. From 1974 to 2023 it was part of the Borough of Scarborough. It is now administered by the unitary North Yorkshire Council.

Speeton was formerly a township and chapelry in the parish of Bridlington. In 1866 Speeton became a separate civil parish, but on 1 April 1935 the parish was abolished and merged with Reighton. In 1931 the parish had a population of 165.

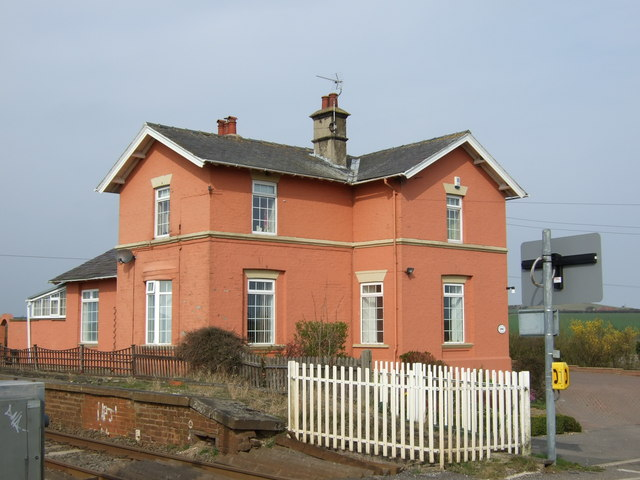
Former Speeton Station House

Speeton railway station on the Yorkshire Coast Line from Hull to Scarborough served the village until it closed on 5 January 1970.

A local geological feature, the Speeton Clay Formation (approximately 130 million years old), was the source of an especially interesting fossil of a hermit crab.

The name Speeton derives from the Old English spēctūn meaning 'speech settlement', possibly referring to council meetings being held here.

== Second World War ==
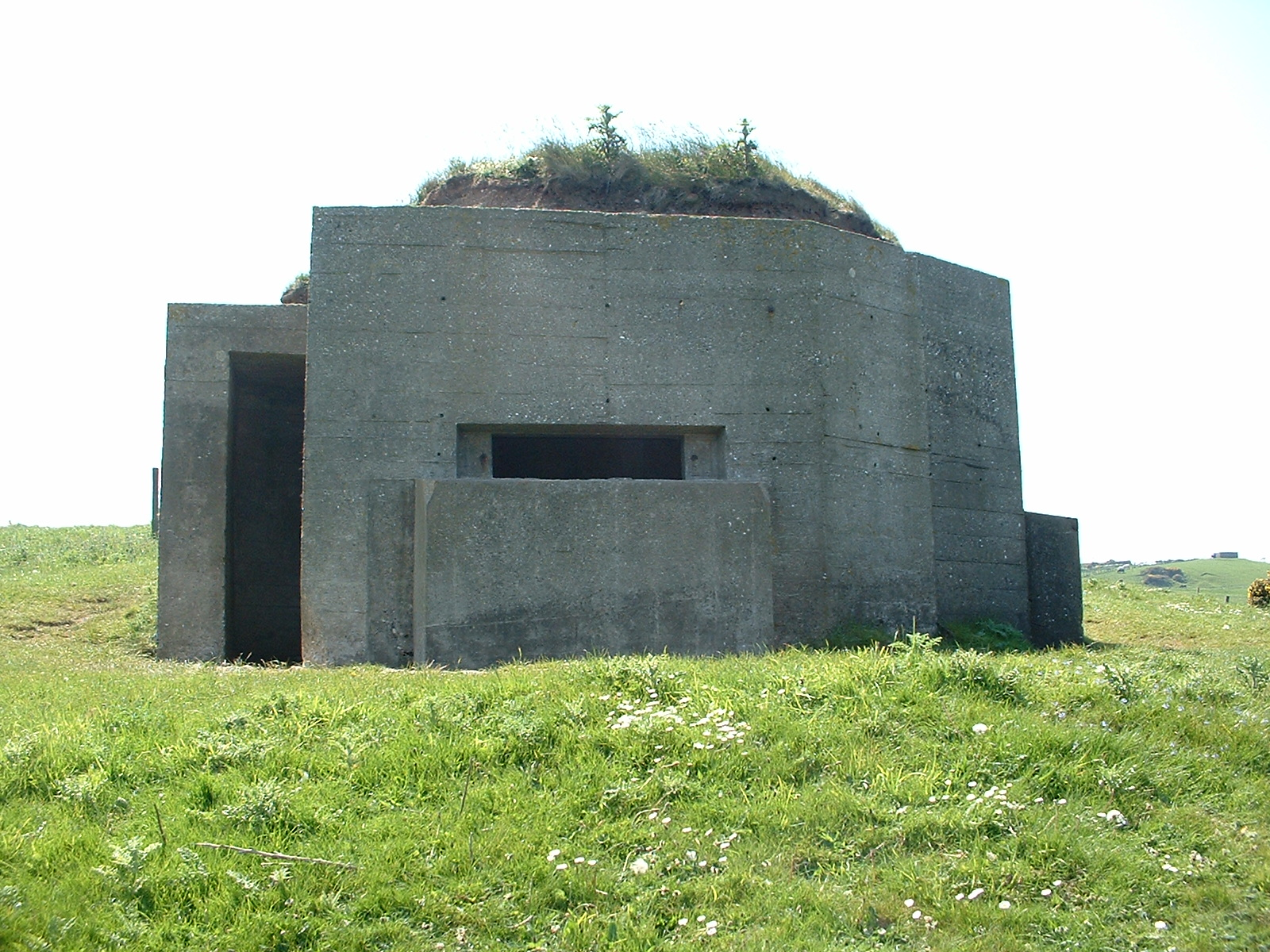
Pillbox, eared type, Speeton.

The Second World War defences constructed around Speeton have been documented by William Foot. They included a large number of pillboxes. Many of the remaining defences have been subject to coastal erosion.

== St Leonard's Church ==
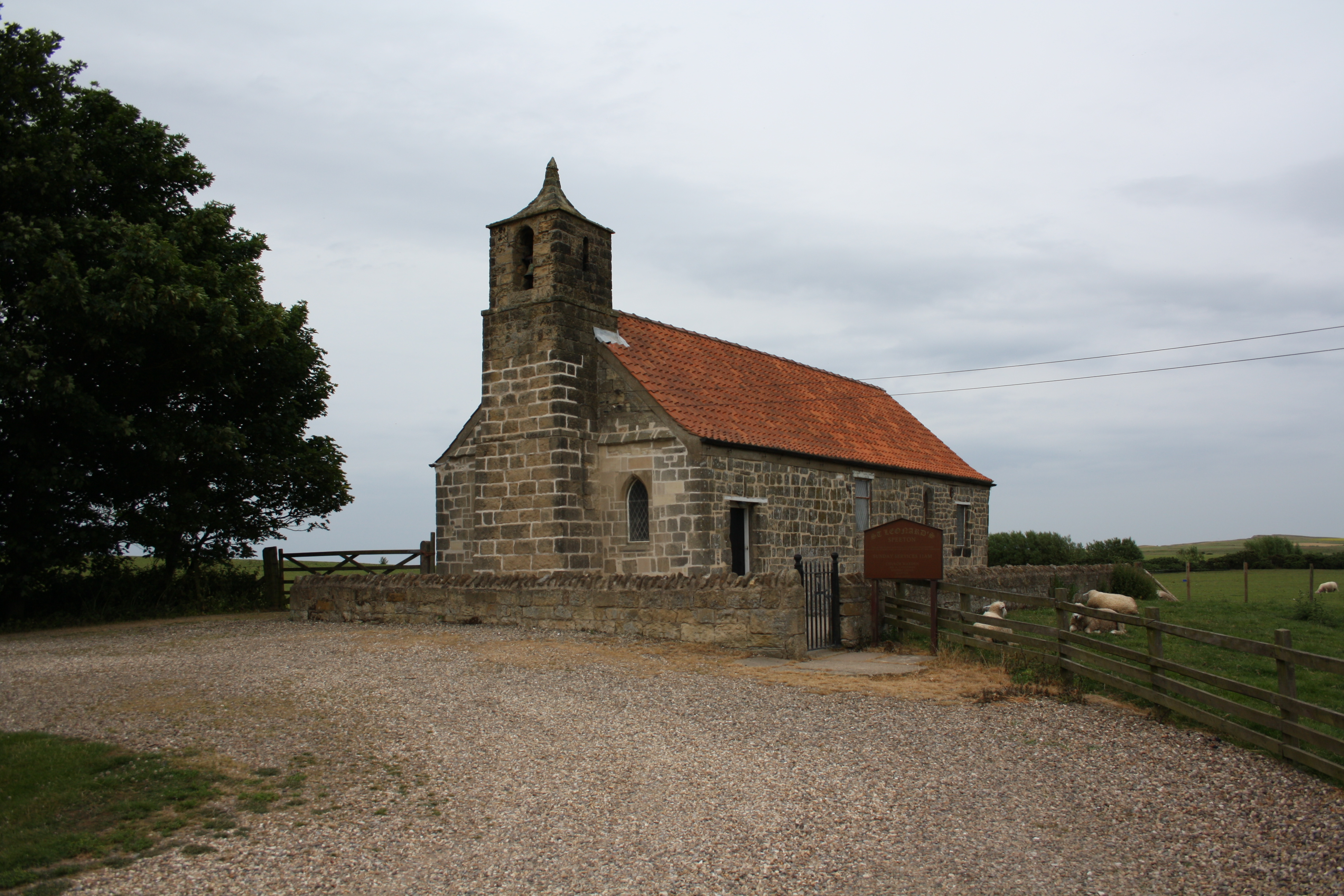
St Leonard's Church

St Leonard's Church, Speeton, is one of the smallest parish churches in Yorkshire and was erected in the early Norman period, probably on the site of an earlier Saxon church. The church was Grade II* listed in June 1966.

== See also ==
- Listed buildings in Reighton
