= Thrintoft Chapel =

Chapel in Thrintoft, North Yorkshire, England

Coordinates: 54°19′53″N 1°30′40″W

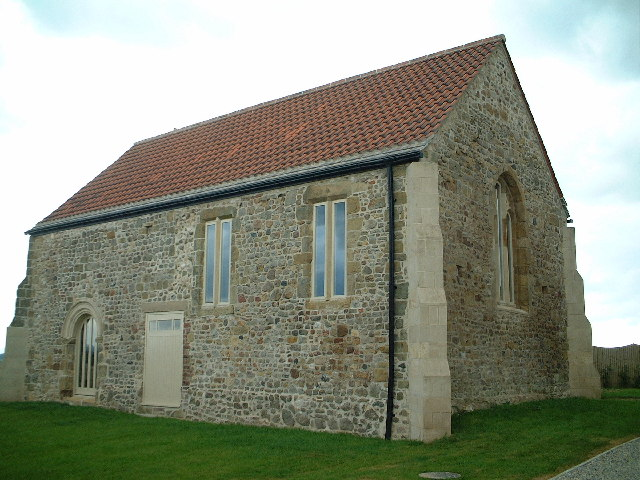
The chapel, in 2001

Thrintoft Chapel is a historic building in Thrintoft, a village in North Yorkshire, in England.

The chapel was founded in 1243, as part of a monastic grange associated with Jervaulx Abbey. It was dedicated to Mary Magdalene. The abbey was suppressed in 1537, and the grange was let out as a private house. The rest of the grange was later demolished, but the former chapel survived, used as a barn. It was grade II* listed in 1953, and in 1999 it was converted into a house.

The chapel is built of rubble, with dressings of ashlar and a modern roof. It has a rectangular plan and offset diagonal buttresses. The original pointed-arch door and two windows are infilled with brick, while one pointed-arch window survives. Inside, there is a 15th-century piscina.

== See also ==
- Grade II* listed buildings in North Yorkshire (district)
