= Reighton =

Village and civil parish in North Yorkshire, England

Coordinates: 54°09′44″N 0°16′17″W

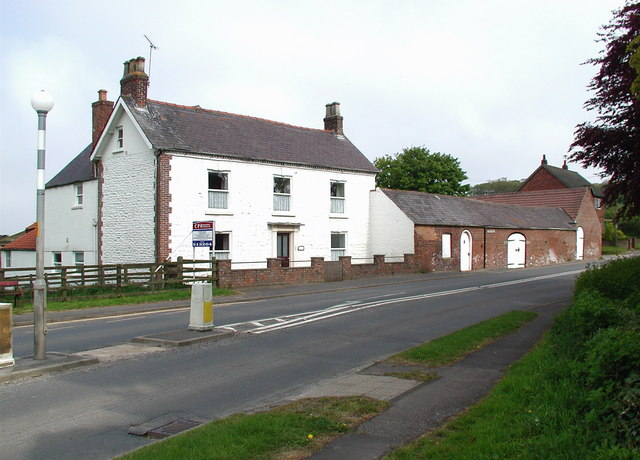
- Reighton Manor House

- Location within North Yorkshire
- Population: 407 (2011 census)
- OS grid reference: TA130752
- Civil parish: Reighton
- Unitary authority: North Yorkshire
- Ceremonial county: North Yorkshire
- Region: Yorkshire and the Humber
- Country: England
- Sovereign state: United Kingdom
- Post town: FILEY
- Postcode district: YO14
- Dialling code: 01723
- Police: North Yorkshire
- Fire: North Yorkshire
- Ambulance: Yorkshire
- UK Parliament: Thirsk and Malton

Reighton is a village and civil parish, in North Yorkshire, England.

From the mediaeval era until the 19th century Reighton was part of Dickering Wapentake. Between 1894 and 1974 Reighton was a part of the Bridlington Rural District, in the East Riding of Yorkshire. From 1974 to 2023 it was part of the Borough of Scarborough; it is now administered by the unitary North Yorkshire Council.

According to the 2011 UK census, Reighton parish had a population of 407, an increase on the 2001 UK census figure of 387. The parish also includes the nearby village of Speeton.

The name Reighton derives from the Old English rictūn, possibly meaning 'settlement on a strip of land'.

== Notable people ==
- Hugh Edwin Strickland

== See also ==
- Listed buildings in Reighton
