= Listed buildings in Malton, North Yorkshire (outer areas) =

Malton is a civil parish in the county of North Yorkshire, England. It contains about 240 listed buildings that are recorded in the National Heritage List for England. Of these, two are listed at Grade I, the highest of the three grades, 14 are at Grade II*, the middle grade, and the others are at Grade II, the lowest grade. The parish contains the market town of Malton, the village of Old Malton and the surrounding area. The earlier settlement is Old Malton, which is associated with Malton Priory. New Malton, to the southwest, grew around the area of the castle, now demolished, and was centred around a market, with a port to the south on the River Derwent.

This list contains the listed buildings outside the central area of the parish that contains Market Place and the streets immediately surrounding it. The outer areas include Old Malton, the industrial area around the former port, and countryside. Most of the listed buildings are houses, cottages and associated structures, farmhouses and farm buildings. The others include the remains of Malton Priory, now a parish church, other churches, chapels and associated structures, a hotel and public houses, a mounting block, bridges, former corn mills, warehouses, a windmill, a former iron foundry, cemetery chapels and a mausoleum, former maltings, two mileposts, a war memorial and two telephone kiosks.

The listed buildings in the central area are included in Listed buildings in Malton, North Yorkshire (central area).

== Key ==
Grade	Criteria
I	Buildings of exceptional interest, sometimes considered to be internationally important
II*	Particularly important buildings of more than special interest
II	Buildings of national importance and special interest

== Buildings ==
Name and location	Photograph	Date	Notes	Grade
Malton Priory; 54.14262°N 0.77898°W		c. 1150	Part of the nave of a priory church, later a parish church, it has been altered through the centuries. It is in stone, and consists of a continuous nave and chancel, and a southwest tower. The tower has three stages, a double-chamfered plinth, and clasping pilaster buttresses. The two lower stages contain lancet windows with hood moulds, the bell openings are paired lancets, and above them are roundels containing quatrefoils. The left buttress contains a blind lancet window in each stage, and in the right buttress are slit openings. The west doorway has a round arch with five orders, above it is a five-light Perpendicular window, and on the gable is a crocketed cross.	I
St Leonard and St Mary's Church and wall 54.13492°N 0.79476°W		Late 12th century	Then church has been altered and extended through the centuries, including restorations in 1856 and 1906–07, and it retains much medieval material. It is built in Hildenley limestone, with repairs in sandstone, there are red tiles to the roof of the nave and chancel, and a lead roof on the north aisle. The church consists of a nave and a chancel, both with a north aisle, a north porch, and a west steeple. The steeple has a tower with four stages, diagonal buttresses, a west door, above which is a window of three lancets with a hood mould, and a carved panel. In the third stage are small lancets, and the bell openings have two lights. Above them are clock faces on three sides, an embattled parapet, and a recessed needle spire with an iron cross finial. The churchyard wall to the south of the church is in Hildenley limestone.	II*
Holgate's House; 54.14286°N 0.77937°W		16th century	The house, which incorporates remains of Malton Grammar School, has been altered and extended. The earlier part is in stone, the later part is in brick faced in stone, and the house has a pantile roof. There is one storey, the earlier part has three bays, and the extension has two. The entrance is in the right return of the extension, and there is a blocked entrance in the earlier part. The windows are horizontally-sliding sashes.	II
Malton Lodge; 54.13562°N 0.79292°W		1604	The remaining part of a mansion, possibly its gatehouse, later extended and used for other purposes, it is in sandstone with a pantile roof. The entrance front has two storeys and five bays, with a one-storey three-bay extension to the right, a two-storey two bay extension to the left, and later extensions further to the left. The middle three bays of the entrance front project, and have paired Tuscan and Doric columns, a moulded string course, a moulded eaves cornice and an embattled parapet flanked by ogee-headed turrets. In the centre of the front is a round arch with a keystone, and an inserted doorway and lunette. Most of the windows are mullioned, some with hood moulds, and in the centre of the parapet is a panel with a moulded surround.	II*
Screen wall northwest of Malton Lodge; 54.13584°N 0.79329°W		c. 1604	The courtyard wall is in sandstone with sloped coping, it extends for about 70 metres (230 ft), and is about 5 metres (16 ft) tall, rising to 6.5 metres (21 ft) over the arches. In the centre is a round arch of voussoirs, now partly blocked, with paired pilasters on bulbous moulded pedestals, imposts, a frieze and a moulded projecting cornice. To the left is an elliptical arch between pilaster buttresses.	II*
Hunters Hall; 54.14437°N 0.77886°W		Late 17th century	The house has been altered and extended. The earlier part is in stone, rendered and whitewashed on the right, with quoins, and a moulded cornice under overhanging eaves. The extensions are in brick, and the pantile roof has a stone verge at the front, coped gables and shaped kneelers. There are two storeys and six bays, and a recessed two-storey two-bay wing on the left. The doorway is approached by steps and has an architrave, and the windows are two-light casements in architraves.	II
Little Thatch; 54.14614°N 0.77948°W		Late 17th century (probable)	The cottage is in sandstone on a rendered plinth, and has a thatched roof. There is one storey and three bays. On the front is a doorway, and the windows are casements. All the openings have painted timber lintels.	II
Old Abbey and outbuildings 54.14204°N 0.77900°W		Late 17th century	A house, incorporating a 12th-century undercroft, which was later extended and used for other purposes. The original part is in sandstone, partly on a chamfered plinth, the rear wing is in orange-red brick, and the roofs are in pantile with a stone slate verge, coped gables, moulded kneelers, and ball and pedestal finials. There are two storeys and an attic, four bays, two-storey one-bay cross-wings, and rear wings. On the front is a doorway with a fanlight, a coved string course, and moulded eaves. Most of the windows are sashes, and there are two gabled dormers. The outbuildings include a stable block with one storey and an attic and four bays. It contains a segmental-arched opening, doorways and sash windows.	II*
Garden wall south of the Talbot Hotel; 54.13372°N 0.80039°W	-	Late 17th century	The garden wall runs north–south, and follows the line of the medieval town wall. It is in Hildenley limestone with flat coping stones, it is just over 2 metres (6 ft 7 in) tall, and runs for about 40 metres (130 ft). The north end has been incorporated into a basement, and towards the centre is a square-headed gateway linking to a short flight of steps.	II
Thatch Cottage; 54.14589°N 0.77826°W		Late 17th century (probable)	The cottage, and byre converted into a garage, are in sandstone, partly on a brick plinth, and have a thatched roof. There is one storey and an attic. In the centre is a doorway, at the left is a garage door, and the windows are casements. In the attic are two raking half-dormers.	II
Eastern garden wall, York House; 54.13397°N 0.79964°W		Late 17th century	The wall running along the eastern side of the garden is in Hildenley limestone with flat coping stones. It is generally between 2 metres (6 ft 7 in) and 3 metres (9.8 ft) tall, ramped over the top terrace, and stepped up elsewhere down the slope of the hill. There have been later repairs and rebuildings.	II
Forecourt walls, piers, gates and railings, York House; 54.13417°N 0.79990°W		Late 17th century	The wall is in stone, about 0.5 metres (1 ft 8 in) tall, with cambered coping, ending in square piers with a moulded cornice and pyramidal cap. The gate piers are square, with rebated angles and banded rustication, each with a moulded cornice, a stepped cap, and a ball and pedestal finial with a band of vermiculated rustication. The gates, overthrow and railings are in wrought iron, and highly ornamented.	II*
Garden steps between terraces, York House; 54.13394°N 0.79977°W	—	Late 17th century	A flight of 14 sandstone steps linking the upper and middle terraces in the garden, to the south of the house. The flight has two landings, the steps have moulded nosings, and the flight is partly flanked by low chamfered parapets.	II
Terrace wall, steps and grotto, York House; 54.13391°N 0.79983°W	—	Late 17th century	The terrace wall and the vaulted chamber are in limestone, and the steps are in sandstone. The steps have low chamfered parapets, they are arranged in two flights of eight steps with a landing between, and have moulded nosings.	II
York House; 54.13412°N 0.79983°W		c. 1684	The house, later used for other purposes, is in sandstone, with a stone slate roof, coped gables and shaped kneelers. There are two storeys and an attic, and an H-shaped plan, with a centre range of two bays, and flanking gabled cross-wings, on a chamfered plinth. In the centre is a doorway with an eared architrave and a keystone, above it is a coved eaves course, and a moulded eaves cornice, and in the attic is a gabled dormer. The wings have quoins and sillbands. In the centre at the rear is a giant round-headed arch with a rusticated and quoined surround. The windows in all parts are sashes in architraves.	II*
The Blue Ball Public House and outbuildings 54.13699°N 0.79860°W		c. 1700	The house, later a public house, has a rendered front and a pantile roof. There are two storeys and four bays. On the front is a doorway, and windows which include a fixed light, horizontally-sliding sashes and top-hung lights. At the rear are one and two-storey ranges of stables and outbuildings.	II
80 and 82 Old Maltongate; 54.13571°N 0.79367°W		Early 18th century	A house, later two cottages, in sandstone on a partial plinth, rendered on the right side, with quoins on the left, and a pantile roof. There are two storeys and two bays. The doorway is in the centre, and the windows are horizontally-sliding sashes.	II
34 Town Street; 54.14510°N 0.77765°W		Early 18th century (probable)	A cottage in sandstone on a stone plinth, with red brick on the right side, and with a pantile roof. There is one storey and an attic, and three bays. The central doorway is flanked by horizontally-sliding sash windows, and in the attic are two flat dormers with casement windows.	II
Castle Dykes; 54.13378°N 0.79210°W	—	Early 18th century (probable)	A house at right angles to the street, in orange-red brick, with a pantile roof, hipped on the right. There are two storeys and an L-shaped plan, with a main range of three bays, one bay facing the street, and a wing with a single projecting bay on the left. The main doorway has a fanlight, and there is another doorway at the left end. The windows are sashes, the window in the wing is horizontally-sliding, and all the openings have wedge lintels.	II
Talbot Hotel; 54.13413°N 0.80048°W		Early 18th century	The hotel is mainly in rendered stone, with pink and cream mottled brick at the rear, quoins, a moulded eaves cornice and a hipped slate roof with iron corner scrolls. It consists of four ranges around a courtyard, and has three storeys. The entrance front has six bays, and contains a doorway with a plain surround and a radial fanlight. The windows are sashes with flat arches of voussoirs. The front facing Yorkersgate has five bays, and a two-story two-bay wing to the left. In the centre is a doorcase flanked by square piers, and with a plain cornice on moulded corbels. The doorway has a rusticated surround, and a flat arch of voussoirs with a keystone. Above the doorway is a square bay window containing a tripartite sash window under a projecting moulded cornice, and the other windows are sashes.	II*
Garden walls and gateways west of Talbot Hotel; 54.13403°N 0.80120°W		Early 18th century	The inner face of the wall is mainly in red brick, the outer face is mainly in limestone, and it has flat coping. The wall is about 2.5 metres (8 ft 2 in) tall, and runs northwest for about 100 metres (330 ft), then south for about 30 metres (98 ft). It contains two square-headed archways in Hildenley limestone. The archway facing the entrance to the hotel is ornamented, it has radiating voussoirs and heavily rusticated jambs, and is infilled with stone and brick. To the west is another similar, but less ornamented arch, which is not infilled.	II*
Retaining wall and steps west of Talbot Hotel; 54.13381°N 0.80089°W	—	Early 18th century	The wall and staircase are in Hildenley limestone. The terrace wall extends for about 60 metres (200 ft), and has cambered coping, and pilaster buttresses that form piers. The staircase makes a quarter turn, it has raked parapet walls with chamfered coping, and it ends in cylindrical piers with shallow domed tops. It is flanked by raked screen walls with square piers. At the head of the staircase is a short flight of simpler steps.	II*
Pedimented archway and wall, Yorkersgate; 54.13423°N 0.80054°W		Early 18th century	The wall is in limestone, with the lower courses in sandstone. It extends for about 45 metres (148 ft), it is up to 2 metres (6 ft 7 in) tall, and at intervals it contains square section piers with shallow pyramidal caps. The archway is in Hildenley limestone, and it has quoined jambs, the alternate ones vermiculated. The arch consists of five vermiculated voussoirs, and above it is a pediment with a moulded cornice.	II*
Forsyth House; 54.13312°N 0.79112°W	—	Mid-18th century	A house, later offices, in rendered brick, with a rear wing in red brick, quoins, and a pantile roof with a coped right gable. There are two storeys and seven bays. In the centre is a doorway with a fanlight, and a similar doorway is inserted in the sixth bay. The windows are sashes, and all the openings have eared architraves. In the rear wing is a round-headed stair window.	II
Churchyard walls, Malton Priory; 54.14238°N 0.77960°W		Mid-18th century	The walls enclosing the churchyard incorporate 12th-century remains from the priory church. They are in stone with some brick, and are coped with stone and pantile. On the north side are entrance gates, screen walls and cast iron railings. The gate piers have a square plan, they are about 2 metres (6 ft 7 in) tall, and each has a moulded base, panelled sides, an overhanging cornice and a shaped cap. The screen walls are about 1.75 metres (5 ft 9 in) tall, with a serpentine plan, flat coping and railings.	I
Mounting block 54.14185°N 0.78316°W		18th century (possible)	The mounting block and milestone to the northwest of 4A Town Street is in sandstone. It consists of three steps, very worn, with a recess for a mile plate. Also, it has a benchmark.	II
Malton Bridge; 54.13292°N 0.79096°W		c. 1760	The bridge carries Castlegate (B1248 road) over the River Derwent and a mid-stream island. It is in sandstone, and consists of three segmental arches of voussoirs. There are mouldings on the downstream side, a raised chamfered band on the upstream side, cutwaters, and a plain chamfered parapet. A concrete walkway with railings has been added.	II
4 Wells Lane; 54.13450°N 0.79632°W		Mid to late 18th century	A house and a shop on a corner site, in painted brick on the front, pink and cream mottled brick on the left, red brick on the right, and stone at the rear, with a moulded eaves cornice, and a pantile roof with a coped right gable. There are two storeys and an attic, and four bays. In the second bay is a doorway with a fanlight, to its left is a sash window, and to the right is a shopfront with pilasters and a cornice. The upper floor contains two sash windows and two blocked windows. All the openings have painted flat arches of gauged brick with keystones. In the attic are two gabled dormers with bargeboards.	II
44 Town Street; 54.14576°N 0.77753°W	—	Mid to late 18th century	The house is in stone on a brick plinth with a pantile roof. There are two storeys, two bays and an outshut. Steps lead up to the central doorway, and the windows are horizontally-sliding sashes.	II
104 Castlegate and outbuildings 54.13363°N 0.79102°W		Late 18th century	A barn converted into a house and outbuildings, it is in brick, partly whitewashed, and has pantile roofs, with coping gables and shaped kneelers on the house, and it is hipped on the outbuilding. The doorway of the house has a divided fanlight and a triple keystone, and the windows are sashes with flat arches. The outbuildings have two storeys and five bays, and a single-storey bay to the right. They contain a doorway with a segmental arch, an inserted garage door, windows, and a lifting door.	II
19 Newbiggin; 54.13688°N 0.79884°W	—	Late 18th century	Two houses, later one shop, on a corner site, in brick, painted on the front, with a dentilled eaves cornice and a pantile roof. There are two storeys and three bays. On the ground floor is a double shopfront and a single shopfront to the right, both with pilasters and imposts, and moulded cornices, and there is a canted bay window on the left. The upper floor contains sash windows.	II
55 Newbiggin; 54.13768°N 0.80027°W	—	Late 18th century	A house in stone with a pantile roof, two storeys and two bays. On the front are a doorway with a divided fanlight, and sash windows, all with flat arches of voussoirs. The windows at the rear are horizontally-sliding sashes.	II
57 Newbiggin; 54.13772°N 0.80036°W	—	Late 18th century	A house in stone with a pantile roof, two storeys and two bays. On the ground floor is a doorway flanked by sash windows, and the upper floor contains horizontally-sliding sashes. All the openings have timber lintels.	II
36 and 38 Old Maltongate; 54.13520°N 0.79503°W		Late 18th century	Two houses, probably previously shops, in sandstone, with quoins and a pantile roof. There are two storeys and two bays. In the centre is a passage doorway, with a doorway and a sash window to the right, and a shopfront with pilasters and imposts, a fascia and a moulded cornice to the left. On the upper floor are sash windows with flat arches of voussoirs.	II
39A Old Maltongate; 54.13582°N 0.79431°W	—	Late 18th century	A hall in stone, with some orange-red brick, and a pantile roof with stone coped gables and shaped kneelers. There are two storeys and a front of two bays. On the front are double doors and sash windows, all with tripartite keystones, and at the rear are round-headed sash windows with arches of voussoirs.	II
40, 42 and 44 Old Maltongate; 54.13523°N 0.79492°W		Late 18th century	A terrace of three cottages in sandstone on a rendered plinth, with brick dressings and a pantile roof. There is one storey and attics, and three bays. Each cottage has a doorway and a sash window o the left, all with flat arches of gauged brick. In the attics are horizontally-sliding sashes in raking dormers.	II
11 and 13 Town Street; 54.14201°N 0.78309°W		Late 18th century	Three, later two, cottages in stone, the lower courses refaced in orange-red brick, on a rendered plinth, with a pantile roof. There are two storeys and three bays. On the front are paired doorways, and the windows are horizontally-sliding sashes, those on the ground floor with flat arches of voussoirs.	II
23 Town Street; 54.14239°N 0.78201°W		Late 18th century (probable)	A cottage in sandstone with brick dressings and a pantile roof. There are two storeys and one bay, and a pent extension on the right. On the front is a doorway and horizontally-sliding sash windows, the ground floor openings with brick segmental arches.	II
27 Town Street; 54.14261°N 0.78111°W		Late 18th century	A farmhouse, later a private house, in sandstone with a pantile roof. There are two storeys and three bays. On the front is a doorway and sash windows, the openings on the ground floor with flat arches of voussoirs.	II
29 Town Street and outbuildings 54.14281°N 0.78024°W		Late 18th century	The house and outbuildings are in sandstone on a brick plinth, and have pantile roofs with coped gables and shaped kneelers. The house has two storeys and three bays. The doorway is in the centre, above it is a blocked window, the other windows are sashes, and all the openings have flat arches of voussoirs with keystones. At the rear on the right is a single-storey range with a stable and a wagon shed, containing doors and a horizontally-sliding sash window.	II
Barn northeast of 29 Town Street; 54.14290°N 0.77994°W		Late 18th century	The barn is in sandstone with red brick dressings and a pantile roof. There are two storeys and four bays. It contains a door and a window, both under segmental arches, slit vents, and a pitching window.	II
35 Town Street and barn 54.14310°N 0.77945°W		Late 18th century	The cottage and barn are in stone, the cottage on a brick plinth, and both have pantile roofs. The cottage has one storey and an attic and three bays, and a single-storey bay to the right. The windows on the front date from the 20th century, two have flat arches of voussoirs, there are two raking dormers, and the entrance is in the left return. The barn has a blocked doorway and two blocked slit vents.	II
40 Town Street; 54.14550°N 0.77761°W		Late 18th century	The house is in sandstone on a brick plinth with a pantile roof. There are two storeys and two bays. The doorway is on the right, and the windows are horizontally-sliding sashes. The ground floor openings have cambered arches of voussoirs.	II
46 and 48 Town Street; 54.14596°N 0.77752°W		Late 18th century	A house, later divided into two, in stone on a brick plinth, with a pantile roof. There are two storeys and two bays. Two steps lead to a central doorway with a divided fanlight, and the windows are small-pane casements, those on the ground floor with flat arches of voussoirs.	II
67–95 Town Street; 54.14480°N 0.77823°W		Late 18th century	A terrace of 15 cottages in sandstone with a pantile roof. There are two storeys, and each cottage has one bay, a doorway, and a window on each floor. The original windows are horizontally-sliding sashes, and some have been replaced by casements or sashes. All the ground floor openings have segmental brick arches.	II
Acomb House Farmhouse; 54.16323°N 0.79575°W	—	Late 18th century	The farmhouse is in stone on a plinth, and has a pantile roof with stone coped gables and shaped kneelers. There are two storeys, a double depth plan and thee bays. The doorway has a fanlight and a moulded cornice hood on consoles. All the windows on the front are sashes with tripartite lintels and triple keystones.	II
Applebye House and outbuildings 54.14526°N 0.77819°W		Late 18th century	The house is in red brick on a plinth, and has a pantile roof with coped gables and shaped kneelers. There are two storeys and an attic, and three bays. Steps lead to the central doorway, above it is a blocked window, and the other windows are sashes. All the openings have flat brick arches and painted keystones. In the right return is a doorway, in the attic is a horizontally-sliding sash window, and at the rear are attached outbuildings.	II
Workshop northwest of Barr Farmhouse; 54.14694°N 0.77689°W		Late 18th century (probable)	A workshop, with an attached smithy, in stone, with brick buttresses, and pantile roofs, the smithy with a catslide roof. The workshop has one storey and two bays, and the smithy, projecting to the left, has one storey and one bay. The openings include a doorway and windows.	II
Howe Farmhouse; 54.16791°N 0.76615°W	—	Late 18th century	The farmhouse is in orange-red brick, the rear wing partly in stone, and it has a pantile roof with stone coped gables and moulded kneelers. There are two storeys, a double depth plan, four bays, and two rear wings. On the front is a doorway and above it is a round-headed stair window, in a continuous frame. To the left is a full-height canted bay window with a shallow parapet, and to the right are sash windows.	II
King's Mill; 54.13338°N 0.78861°W		Late 18th century	A corn mill that was rebuilt in 1802, and later extended. It is in red brick with stone dressings, and has a pantile roof with stone copings and kneelers. The main block has four storeys and six bays, to the left is an extension with three storeys, three bays and a pedimented gable containing a blind oculus, and at right angles on the right is a kiln house with two storeys, two bays and a pyramidal roof. The openings in the main range have segmental heads.	II
Manor Farmhouse; 54.14315°N 0.77937°W		Late 18th century	The farmhouse is in sandstone on a brick plinth, with an extension in red mottled brick and a pantile roof. There are two storeys and three bays, and a two-bay rear wing. On the front are a doorway with a blind window above, and sash windows, the ground floor openings with segmental arches of voussoirs.	II
Post Office; 54.14213°N 0.78258°W		Late 18th century	A house, later a post office, in sandstone on a rendered plinth, with a pantile roof. There are two storeys and two bays. The central doorway has a wedge lintel under a blocked round-arched opening. The windows are sashes, those on the ground floor with flat arches of voussoirs. A post box is set into the wall to the right of the doorway.	II
The Wentworth Arms Hotel and outbuildings 54.14587°N 0.77806°W		Late 18th century	The coaching inn, later a public house, is in red brick with a stone outshut, the outbuildings are in stone, and all have pantile roofs. The public house has two storeys and an attic, a double depth plan, three bays, and an outshut. The doorway is in the centre, and the windows are horizontally-sliding sashes with segmental heads. Attached at the right rear is a stable range with one storey and two bays, and an extension with two storeys and two bays, and at the left rear is a stable range with one storey and six bays.	II
Virginia Cottage; 54.14521°N 0.77817°W		Late 18th century	The cottage is in red brick on a plinth, and has a pantile roof. There are two storeys and one bay. The doorway to the right has a fanlight, the windows are horizontally-sliding sashes, and the ground floor openings have segmental heads.	II
Warehouse, Owston's Wharf; 54.13353°N 0.79897°W		Late 18th century	The warehouse is in red brick with stone dressings and a hipped pantile roof. There is a rectangular plan, three storeys on the river front, two on the yard front, and seven bays. In the centre of the river front is a wide segmental-arched entrance, and there are windows with segmental arches on the ground floor and flat arches on the upper floor. The yard front contains irregular openings.	II
Willow Farmhouse; 54.14729°N 0.77775°W		Late 18th century	The farmhouse, which was extended to the left in the mid-19th century, is in sandstone with pantile roofs, and two storeys. The original part has two bays, a doorway and sash windows, those on the ground floor with cambered heads. The extension is taller, with three bays, a central doorway with a divided fanlight, above which is a blind window the other windows are sashes, and all the openings have keystones.	II
Windmill; 54.15587°N 0.78691°W		Late 18th century	The windmill at Windmill Farm is in orange-red brick, and has a conical roof in Welsh slate with a lead cap finial. The windmill has a circular plan, it is tapering, and has four storeys. On the eastern side, steps lead up to a doorway, and above there are windows on each storey, some blocked.	II
The Gannock House; 54.14306°N 0.77902°W		1786	A schoolmaster's house, later a vicarage, it was extended in the 19th century. The original part is in sandstone, the extension is in pink and cream mottled brick, and it has a pantile roof with stone coped gables and shaped kneelers. The main front has two storeys and three bays, and a recessed two-storey one-bay wing on the right. Most of the windows are sashes with flat arches of voussoirs, and over the doorway is an inscribed datestone. The front facing Town Street has two storeys and two bays, and a two-storey one-bay wing on the left. The doorway has a quoined surround and a fanlight, and the windows are casements, those on the ground floor with cambered arches. To the left is a wall with a round-arched opening.	II
41 and 43 Old Maltongate; 54.13568°N 0.79420°W		c. 1800	Two houses in orange-red brick on a stone plinth, with an eaves cornice and a pantile roof. There are two storeys and attics, and three bays. Steps lead up to a doorway on the front, with a divided fanlight. To the left is a passageway leading to the other doorway. The windows are sashes, and the openings on the front have wedge lintels. In the attic are two flat-roofed dormers.	II
30, 32 and 34 Princess Road; 54.13735°N 0.79530°W	cntre	Late 18th or early 19th century	A row of three cottages in sandstone, with a pantile roof, coped gables and shaped kneelers. There are two storeys and three bays. Each cottage has a doorway with pilasters and a cornice. The windows on the front are sashes, and at the rear they are horizontally-sliding sashes.	II
21 Town Street; 54.14232°N 0.78218°W		Late 18th or early 19th century	The house is in stone with a pantile roof. There are two storeys and an L-shaped plan, with a front block of one bay, and a lower rear extension. On the front is a doorway, and a sash window on each floor, the ground floor openings with flat arches of voussoirs. In the extension is a small-pane window on the ground floor and a horizontally-sliding sash above.	II
Brandsby Agricultural Traders' Association; 54.13356°N 0.79690°W		c. 1814	A large corn mill, converted into a factory in about 1887, in pink and cream mottled brick on a sandstone plinth, with dressings in orange-red brick, a sill band, a moulded eaves cornice, and a slate roof. The main block has four storeys and eight bays and a central five-storey gabled bay. To the left is a cross-wing with four storeys and three bays, under a pediment containing an oculus, and there is a single-storey three-bay boiler house. The ground floor of the wing has three recessed arched openings, the middle one with a doorway, and the outer ones with windows. Most of the windows in the building are cross windows.	II
Baptist Church; 54.13415°N 0.79650°W		1822	The church is in painted brick on the front, with pink and cream mottled brick on the right and at the rear, paired modillion eaves, and a hipped slate roof with wrought iron corner scrolls. There are two storeys and a front of three bays. In the centre is a doorway with a tall radial-glazed fanlight. The windows are sashes also with radial-glazed round heads. To the right of the doorway is an iron boot scraper.	II
11 Mount Road; 54.13625°N 0.80095°W	—	Early 19th century	The house is in pink and cream mottled brick, with dressings in orange-red brick, stone at the rear, a stepped eaves course, and a pantile roof. There are two storeys and three bays. In the centre is a doorway, over which is a round-arched stair window. To its left is a replacement window, and the other windows are tripartite with a central sash. All the windows have cambered arches, and all the arches are quoined and in brick.	II
8–14 Old Maltongate; 54.13489°N 0.79581°W		Early 19th century	A terrace of four houses in pink and cream mottled brick, with a dentilled eaves course, and a pantile roof with coped gables and shaped kneelers. There are three storeys and five bays. On the ground floor is a round-arched passageway, a shopfront, bow windows, doorways with fanlights, and a sash window. The upper floors contain sash windows, and two blind windows over the passage entry; all the windows have wedge lintels.	II
45A Old Maltongate; 54.13576°N 0.79414°W	—	Early 19th century	Formerly the rear wing of No. 45, later a house, in orange-red brick, with a pantile roof, and a coped gable and shaped kneeler on the right. There are two storeys and two bays. The door has a divided fanlight, there is a tripartite window on each floor, a sash window and a small window, most with flat arches of gauged brick.	II
1 Princess Road; 54.13692°N 0.79843°W	—	Early 19th century	A house on a corner site in pink and cream mottled brick on a stone plinth, with an eaves cornice and a hipped slate roof. There are two storeys, three bays on Princess Road and two on Castlegate. In the centre is a doorway with a quoined surround, a fanlight, and a triple keystone. In the left bay are blocked windows, and the other windows are sashes, those on the ground floor with brick cambered arches.	II
4A Town Street; 54.14180°N 0.78313°W		Early 19th century	The house is in pink and cream mottled brick with a dentilled eaves course and a pantile roof. There are two storeys and three bays. At the left is a doorway with a cambered arch, and in the right bay is a shallow bow window. The other windows are horizontally-sliding sashes, those on the ground floor with cambered heads.	II
109 Town Street; 54.14570°N 0.77844°W	—	Early 19th century (possible)	The house is in stone, rendered on the right side, on a rendered plinth, with a pantile roof. There are two storeys and two bays. In the centre is a doorway with a fanlight, and all the windows are 20th-century replacements.	II
1 and 1A Victoria Road; 54.13636°N 0.80086°W	—	Early 19th century	A house, divided into two, in stone with a pantile roof. There are two storeys and three bays. On the front are steps leading to two doorways with fanlights, and the windows are sashes.	II
6 Wells Lane; 54.13444°N 0.79645°W	—	Early 19th century	A house, rendered on the front and left side, and in stone at the rear, with a pantile roof. There are two storeys and three bays. The doorway is in the centre, and the windows are sashes with painted stone sills.	II
Barr Farmhouse and outbuildings 54.14686°N 0.77673°W		Early 19th century	The farmhouse, and byre to the left, are in stone on a brick plinth, with pantile roofs. The house has two storeys and an attic, and three bays. The doorway is in the centre, and is flanked by tripartite sash windows. On the upper floor are sash windows, the attic windows are blocked, and all the openings have flat arches of voussoirs. The byre has one storey, and there are no openings on the front.	II
Farm buildings north of Howe Farmhouse; 54.16836°N 0.76627°W	—	Early 19th century	The farm buildings consist of a threshing barn, and attached ranges of byres, stables, loose boxes and sheds. They are in stone on a brick plinth, with extensions in red brick, and pantile roofs. The barn has two storeys and six bays, the west range has one storey and lofts and nine bays, and the east range has one storey and nine bays. At the north end is a three-bay cart shed and other sheds.	II
Leonard House; 54.13574°N 0.79404°W		Early 19th century	The house is in stone, refronted in brick and painted, with a dentilled eaves cornice, and a pantile roof with coped gables and shaped kneelers. There are two storeys, six bays, a cellar and a rear wing. The doorway has fluted pilasters, a fanlight, a frieze with a fluted central panel, and a cornice hood. The windows are sashes in moulded frames, with flat brick gauged arches and keystones, and there are three roof lights.	II
Nabun House; 54.14333°N 0.77925°W		Early 19th century	The house is in sandstone, and has a roof with coped gables and shaped kneelers. There are two storeys and two bays. The doorway is in the centre, the windows are sashes, and all the openings have heavy plain lintels.	II
Newbiggin House; 54.13736°N 0.79926°W	—	Early 19th century	The house is in orange-red brick, with a floor band, an eaves band, and a hipped slate roof with wrought iron corner scrolls. There are three storeys and two bays. In the right bay is a doorway with sunk-panel pilasters and moulded imposts, a patterned fanlight, and an open pediment. The windows are sashes, with flat gauged brick arches. At the rear is a full-height canted bay window.	II
Garden wall from the southeast of the Talbot Hotel; 54.13383°N 0.80005°W	—	Early 19th century	The wall is built from reused 17th-century orange-red brick and has flat stone coping. It runs south, and is between 2 metres (6 ft 7 in) and 3 metres (9.8 ft) tall. There are pilaster buttresses on the west side, and the wall is ramped as it climbs.	II
Buildings, Talbot Yard; 54.13439°N 0.80101°W	—	Early 19th century	The two yards, facing south, are divided by a stable range, on the eastern side is a former carriage house, and attached are various outbuildings. The buildings are in red brick with limestone dressings, and pantile roofs with coped gables and kneelers. The carriage house has a central gabled bay containing a carriage entrance, and is flanked by recessed wings with one storey and attics. The central stable range has two storeys, and various openings.	II
The George Public House; 54.13438°N 0.79798°W		Early 19th century	A coaching inn, later a public house, in painted stone on the front, the carriage arch in painted brick, in brick at the rear, and it has roofs of pantile and slate. There are three storeys and four bays, the left bay containing a cambered carriage arch of voussoirs. The other bays have a plinth, and in the centre is a doorway with pilasters, and a cornice hood on bulbous brackets. The windows are sashes with flat arches.	II
The New Globe Public House; 54.13468°N 0.79650°W		Early 19th century	The public house, on a corner site, has a rendered and colourwashed front, red brick on the left return, and a pantile roof. There are two storeys and three bays, and a rear outshut with a catslide roof. The doorway has a round arch, pilasters, moulded imposts, and a cornice surmounted by a low balustrade. The windows are sashes, and on the outshut is a gabled dormer.	II
The Royal Oak Public House; 54.14396°N 0.77901°W		Early 19th century	A public house and a cottage to the right, with two storeys, and a pantile roof with coped gables and shaped kneelers. The public house is in painted rendered stone, with applied timber framing to the upper floor. There are three bays, the upper floor is jettied, and the right bay is gabled. The central doorway has a two-light window to its left, and a canted oriel window to the right. The window in the left bay on the upper floor has four lights, and the other windows are cross windows. The cottage is in stone, and has one bay. It contains a doorway to the left, and sash windows, the ground floor openings with wedge lintels.	II
Workshop northeast of 104 Castlegate; 54.13323°N 0.79083°W	—	Early 19th century	A warehouse, later a workshop, in pink and cream mottled brick on a chamfered sandstone plinth with a pantile roof. There are three storeys and four bays. On the front are doorways, lifting doors and windows, the openings on the lower two floors with segmental-arched heads.	II
Fitzwilliam Estate Office; 54.13608°N 0.79236°W		1834	A terrace of three cottages in rusticated sandstone on a chamfered plinth, with a pantile roof and crow-stepped gables. There is one storey and attics, and five bays. On the front, the left doorway has a Gibbs surround, and the other two doorways have quoined and chamfered surrounds and divided fanlights. The windows are sashes, some with a single light, and others with mullions. Above, each bay contains a half-dormer with a crow-stepped gable. On the rear of the roof is a dated weathervane.	II
St Mary's Community Centre; 54.13423°N 0.79650°W	—	1837	A church, later used for other purposes, with a front of painted rendered stone, a rear of blackened brick, and a slate roof with a coped gable. There are two storeys and two bays, and it has a chamfered plinth and quoins. In the centre is a doorway with a radial fanlight, and the windows are cross windows with segmental heads. The top is pedimented by an eaves band, and it contains a blind lunette.	II
Barton Cottage; 54.13423°N 0.80345°W	—	c. 1840	A house in sandstone, with an extension in pink and cream mottled brick, a modillion eaves cornice, and a hipped slate roof. There are two storeys and three bays, and a single-bay extension on the left. The central doorway has a fanlight, and a moulded cornice hood on shaped brackets. To its right is a three-light canted bay window with a moulded cornice, and the other windows are sashes.	II
28A Newbiggin; 54.13732°N 0.79916°W	—	Mid-19th century	A house in pink and cream mottled brick with a pantile roof. There are three storeys and one bay. On the ground floor, to the left, is a doorway with a fanlight and a segmental arch. The windows are sashes, those on the lower two floors with segmental heads.	II
2 Old Maltongate; 54.13477°N 0.79616°W		Mid-19th century	A shop with accommodation on a corner site, in pink and cream mottled brick on a plinth, with an eaves cornice, and a slate roof, hipped on the corner. There are three storeys and an L-shaped plan, with three bays on Old Maltongate, two on Castlegate, and a canted bay on the corner. On the ground floor are doorways and windows with round-arched or segmental brick arched heads. The upper floors contain sash windows, on the middle floor with segmental heads, and on the top floor with flat heads. All the openings have triple keystones.	II
46 Old Maltongate and outbuildings 54.13536°N 0.79457°W		Mid-19th century	An iron foundry on a corner site, later converted for other uses, it is in pink and cream mottled brick, with a stepped eaves course and a pantile roof, hipped on the corner. There are two storeys and an L-shaped plan, with one bay on each front, and a canted bay on the corner. In the corner bay is a doorway with a fanlight, in the bay facing the road is a segmental-arched shop window with four round-arched lights, and in the right return are two windows under a segmental arch. Above each ground floor opening is a painted cambered arch with a triple keystone. The upper floor contains sash windows with triple keystones.	II
66 Old Maltongate; 54.13560°N 0.79392°W	—	Mid-19th century	A house in pink and cream brick, with dressings in orange-red brick and a pantile roof. There are two storeys and an attic and two bays. In the centre is a doorway, with a tripartite sash window to the left and a sash window to the right. The windows are similar on the upper floor but with horizontally-sliding sashes. All the openings have segmental arches. In the attic is a flat-roofed dormer.	II
68 Old Maltongate; 54.13563°N 0.79385°W		Mid-19th century	A house in pink and cream brick on the front and red brick elsewhere, with dressings in orange-red brick, and a pantile roof. There are two storeys and an attic, and one bay. The doorway on the right has a divided fanlight, to its left is a bow window, and on the upper floor is a tripartite sash window. The doorway and the upper floor window have cambered arches of quoined brick. In the attic is a raking dormer.	II
3 and 5 Town Street; 54.14195°N 0.78365°W		Mid-19th century	A pair of houses in red brick on a stone plinth, with sandstone dressings, sandstone at the rear, a floor band, and a slate roof with overhanging eaves on shaped brackets. There are two storeys, two bays, and flanking recessed single-bay wings. The doorways are in the wings, and the windows are sashes with hood moulds on the ground floor, and casements on the upper floor.	II
7 and 9 Town Street; 54.14198°N 0.78341°W		Mid-19th century	A pair of houses in red brick on a stone plinth, with sandstone dressings, sandstone at the rear, and a slate roof with overhanging eaves on shaped brackets. There are two storeys, two bays, and flanking recessed single-bay wings. The doorways are in the wings, with quoined surrounds and shouldered arches, and above them are oculi in quatrefoil frames. The other windows are casements, those on the ground floor with hood moulds, and those above in gabled half-dormers, with shaped aprons.	II
25 Town Street; 54.14258°N 0.78129°W		19th century	A house in sandstone on a brick plinth with a pantile roof. There are two storeys and two bays. The doorway is in the left return, and on the front are sash windows.	II
Church Hall, Railway Street; 54.13406°N 0.79653°W		Mid-19th century	The hall is in pink and cream mottled brick on a chamfered plinth, with sandstone dressings, a moulded cornice, and a slate roof with a coped gable, shaped kneelers and a moulded finial. There is one storey and an attic, and three narrow bays under a semicircular arch with a hood mould. In the centre is a doorway flanked by recessed tall windows with shouldered lintels. Above the doorway are paired windows with chamfered lintels, and a circular window.	II
Garden wall east of Hunters Hall; 54.14426°N 0.77861°W	—	19th century	The wall is in pink and cream brick with cambered stone coping, it extends for about 50 metres (160 ft), and has a curved plan. The wall contains a gate between square piers with flat coping, and between them is a wrought iron overthrow.	II
Ralph Yates and Sons; 54.13385°N 0.79675°W		Mid-19th century	An iron foundry on a corner site, later used for other purposes, in pink and cream mottled brick, with sandstone dressings, quoins in orange-red brick, and a slate roof with coped gables. There is an L-shaped plan, with a front range of two storeys and five bays, a three-bay cross-wing on the right, and a right return with two storeys and an attic, and twelve bays. On the front is a semicircular arch with a quoined surround and an inscription in the tympanum, and above are two oculi with keystones. The ground floor windows have segmental heads, and those above have flat heads. The cross-wing has a round-arched entrance flanked by round-headed windows, and above is a four-light window and two oculi. The bays on both fronts are divided by pilasters.	II
Gas lamp 5 metres west of St Mary's Priory Church; 54.14259°N 0.77940°W		Mid-19th century	The gas lamp is in the churchyard, to the west of the church. It is in painted cast iron, and about 4 metres (13 ft) tall. The lamp consists of a tapering cylindrical shaft with foliate necking, a moulded tapered crossbar, and S-shaped brackets supporting a square lantern with an acorn finial.	II
Gas lamp 30 metres west of St Mary's Priory Church; 54.14257°N 0.77968°W		Mid-19th century	The gas lamp is in the churchyard, to the west of the church. It is in painted cast iron and about 5 metres (16 ft) tall. The lamp consists of a tapering cylindrical shaft with shaft rings, on a tall octagonal pedestal, with a tapered crossbar, and S-shaped brackets supporting a square lantern with an acorn finial.	II
The Old School House and Classroom Cottage; 54.14532°N 0.77762°W		Mid-19th century	A school divided into two houses, in sandstone on a chamfered plinth, partly colourwashed, with a slate roof, stone copings and moulded finials. There is one storey and a front of three bays, the outer bays gabled. The central doorway has a chamfered quoined surround. The right bay contains a mullioned and transomed window with a quoined surround, and above are slit vents. In the left bay is a window consisting of five stepped lancets with cusped heads under a relieving arch. On the roof is a diagonally-set clock tower and bellcote, with a pyramidal steeple, and a wrought iron crocketed weathervane.	II
27 and 27A The Mount; 54.13775°N 0.80223°W	—	c. 1860	The house is in sandstone on a moulded plinth, with quoins, valanced eaves, a banded tiled roof, and gables with pierced and scalloped bargeboards. The front has one storey and an attic, and two-bays, and on the right is a cross-wing with two storeys and an attic. In the centre of the front is a gabled porch with a moulded finial, and a doorway with a double-chamfered surround and a hood mould. On the front is a square bay window, on the left return is a canted bay window, and most of the other windows have trefoil heads.	II
Cemetery chapels 54.13905°N 0.79650°W		1860	Between the two chapels is a gabled arch. The buildings are in sandstone on a chamfered plinth, with quoins, and slate roofs with coped gables. Above the arch is blind quatrefoil moulding, and a bellcote with a trefoiled opening surmounted by a wrought iron finial. The chapel is to the east, and has three bays, and the chapel of rest, to the west, has one bay.	II
Railway Bridge; 54.13318°N 0.79726°W		c. 1860	The bridge carries Railway Street over the River Derwent. It is in cast iron, between abutments in rusticated sandstone. The bridge consists of two flat spans on six transverse Tuscan columns. Each abutment has a cornice band below a plain parapet with flat coping. The bridge has an arcaded balustrade with shaped coping.	II
The Maltings; 54.13449°N 0.79566°W		Mid to late 19th century	The former maltings, later converted for other uses, is in pink and cream mottled brick, with dressings in cream brick, an eaves course of orange-red moulded brick, a moulded eaves cornice, and a half-hipped slate roof with wrought iron corner scrolls. There are three storeys, a front of nine bays, four bays on the left return, and three on the right return. On each front, every bay contains a blind recessed full-height arch. The middle bay on the main front has a quoined surround, and contains a segmental-arched doorway. Elsewhere, every arch contains a segmental-arched window on each floor. In the top storey of the right return is a cast iron lifting platform with iron railings on scrolled iron brackets, in gabled timber housing.	II
Milepost, Old Malton; 54.14436°N 0.77811°W		Late 19th century	The milepost on the east side of Town Street is in cast iron, and has a triangular plan, a sloped upper face, and a semicircular head. The top is inscribed "NORTH RIDING OF YORKSHIRE", on the sloped face is "PICKERING UDC", the lower faces have pointing arrows, and on the left face are the distances to Malton and York, and on the right face to Pickering and Whitby.	II
Milepost north of Howe Farm; 54.17083°N 0.76449°W		Late 19th century	The milepost on the east side of the A169 road, is about 1 metre (3 ft 3 in) tall, in cast iron, and has a triangular plan, a sloped upper face, and a semicircular head. The top is inscribed "NORTH RIDING OF YORKSHIRE", on the sloped face is "PICKERING UDC", the lower faces have pointing arrows, and on the left face are the distances to Malton and York, and on the right face to Pickering and Whitby.	II
War memorial and wall 54.13404°N 0.80207°W		c. 1920	The war memorial and screen wall are in sandstone. The memorial has a hexagonal plan, and consists of a cross on a tall tapering shaft, on a base and chamfered plinth set diagonally on a high stepped pedestal. The plinth has inscriptions and panels containing carvings. The wall is rusticated and coped, and has a half-hexagonal plan. On the wall are panels commemorating the two World Wars, and at the ends are lions couchant.	II
Behrens Mausoleum; 54.13842°N 0.79662°W	—	Early 20th century	The mausoleum in New Malton Cemetery is pebbledashed on a brick plinth, with stone dressings, angle buttresses, overhanging bracketed eaves, and a hipped and sprocketed tile roof. There is one storey and a rectangular plan. The east front has one bay, and it contains a round-arched doorway with a chamfered quoined surround, and a hood mould. The north and south fronts have two bays, and contain square-headed windows in quoined architraves.	II
Telephone kiosk, Lascelles Lane; 54.14444°N 0.77803°W		1935	The K6 type telephone kiosk at the corner of Lascelles Lane was designed by Giles Gilbert Scott. Constructed in cast iron with a square plan and a dome, it has three unperforated crowns in the top panels.	II
Telephone kiosk, Railway Street; 54.13440°N 0.79686°W	—	1935	The K6 type telephone kiosk on Railway Street was designed by Giles Gilbert Scott. Constructed in cast iron with a square plan and a dome, it has three unperforated crowns in the top panels.	II
