= King's Mill =

King's Mill or Kings Mill may refer to:

== In England ==
- King's Mill, Castle Donington, river crossing and former watermill in Leicestershire
- King's Mill, Malton, watermill in North Yorkshire
- Kings Mill, Oxford, former watermill in Oxford
- King's Mill, Settle, building in North Yorkshire
- King's Mill, Shipley, windmill in West Sussex
- Kings Mill, Stamford, building in Lincolnshire

== Elsewhere ==
- Kings Mill, Michigan, an unincorporated community
- King's Mill, Toronto
- King's Mills, a former name for the Gilbert Islands

== See also ==
- King's Mill Hospital, Nottinghamshire
- Kings Mill Reservoir, Nottinghamshire
- Kings Mills, Ohio
- Kingsmill (disambiguation)
