= St Leonard & Mary, Malton =

Roman Catholic church in North Yorkshire, England

Coordinates: 54.13489°N 0.79451°W

St Leonard and Mary, Malton
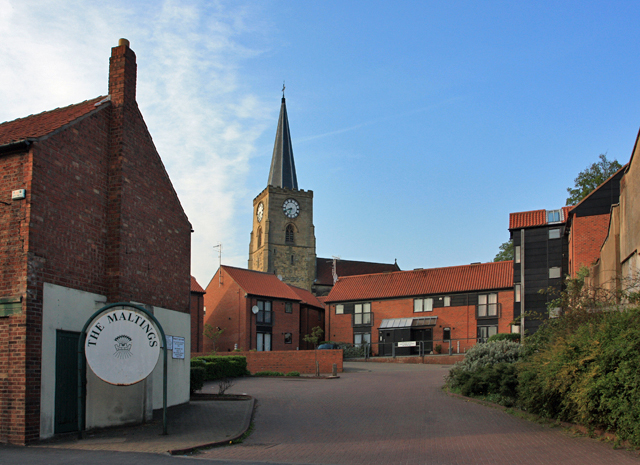
- St Leonard and Mary, Malton
- OS grid reference: SE 78846 71676
- Address: Church Hill, Malton YO17 7EJ
- Country: England
- Denomination: Catholic
- Website: http://www.malton-catholic.org

History
- Status: Active
- Dedication: St Leonard, St Mary

Architecture
- Heritage designation: Grade II*
- Designated: 29 September 1951
- Years built: 12th Century

Administration
- Diocese: Middlesbrough

Clergy
- Priest: Fr. Tim Bywater

St Leonard & Mary Catholic Church is a medieval church situated in Malton, North Yorkshire, England, now serving a parish in the Roman Catholic Diocese of Middlesbrough. It is a Grade II* listed building in the National Heritage List for England, and retains at least 24 pieces of medieval figurative carving.

A notice outside of the church reads: "St Leonard's with St Mary's. Founded in the 12th century as a Chapel of Ease to the Gilbertine Priory at Old Malton. This Church was transferred by way of gift as an ecumenical gesture of goodwill from the Church of England to the Roman Catholic Church in 1971."

Dating as it does from the mid- to late-1100s, this church is the oldest currently held by Catholics in England, a distinction formerly belonging to St Etheldreda's, London, which was built c.1284-86. St Leonard's is the first English parish church to be returned to Roman Catholic use following the Reformation.

== History ==
The first known mention of St. Leonard's is around 1150, when it was given, together with St Michael's, to the Gilbertine order as a chapel of ease for Malton Priory, about a mile distant in "old" Malton. The church's tower was built in the 15th century. It originally had a stone spire, which was later replaced by one of timber and slate.

The church passed into the hands of the new Church of England around December 1539, when the dissolution of the monasteries by Henry VIII closed Malton Priory.

In 1768 a peal of 8 bells was added to the tower, cast by Lester and Pack (later the Whitechapel Bell Foundry). A tower clock was installed in 1897, to celebrate the Diamond Jubilee of Queen Victoria.

Over the centuries there were considerable changes to the building. In 1907 a restoration attempt was undertaken by the architect Charles Hodgson Fowler. This included a refenestration of the north elevation and a rebuilding of the south walls of the nave and chancel.

In 1969, the Church of England closed St Leonard's and, in 1971, presented it to the Roman Catholic Church in a gesture of goodwill. At that time, the dedication of the church to St Leonard was extended to include St Mary: it was from the Catholic chapel to St Mary in Wells Street, Malton, that the congregation transferred. A stained glass window from that chapel was conveyed as a physical marker of this move.

In 1988-9 there was a major reordering of the floor plan: a dais with an altar was placed in the middle of the nave on the south side and the seating arranged around that. The old chancel was retained as the Blessed Sacrament chapel, separated from the nave by an open screen.

== See also ==
- Grade II* listed churches in North Yorkshire (district)
- Listed buildings in Malton, North Yorkshire (outer areas)
