= Maltings (disambiguation) =

A maltings or malt house is a building where cereal grain is converted into malt.

Maltings may also refer to:

- The Maltings, a malt house in Mittagong, New South Wales, Australia
- The Maltings, Malton, a business centre in England
- The Maltings, Snape (Snape Maltings), an arts complex in Snape, Suffolk, England
- The Maltings, York, a pub in England
- Maltings Academy, a secondary school in Witham, Essex, England
- The Maltings College, a sixth form centre in Halifax, West Yorkshire, England
- The Maltings School (Malting House School), an experimental educational institution that operated from 1924 to 1929 in Cambridge, England
- The Maltings Theatre & Cinema, Berwick-upon-Tweed, Northumberland, England

== See also ==
- Bass Maltings, Sleaford, an industrial complex in Sleaford, Lincolnshire, England
- Farnham Maltings, a creative arts centre in Farnham, Surrey, England
- Toowoomba Maltings, a heritage-listed malt house in Toowoomba, Queensland, Australia
