= Old Abbey, Malton =

Building in Old Malton, North Yorkshire, England

Coordinates: 54.1421°N 0.7790°W

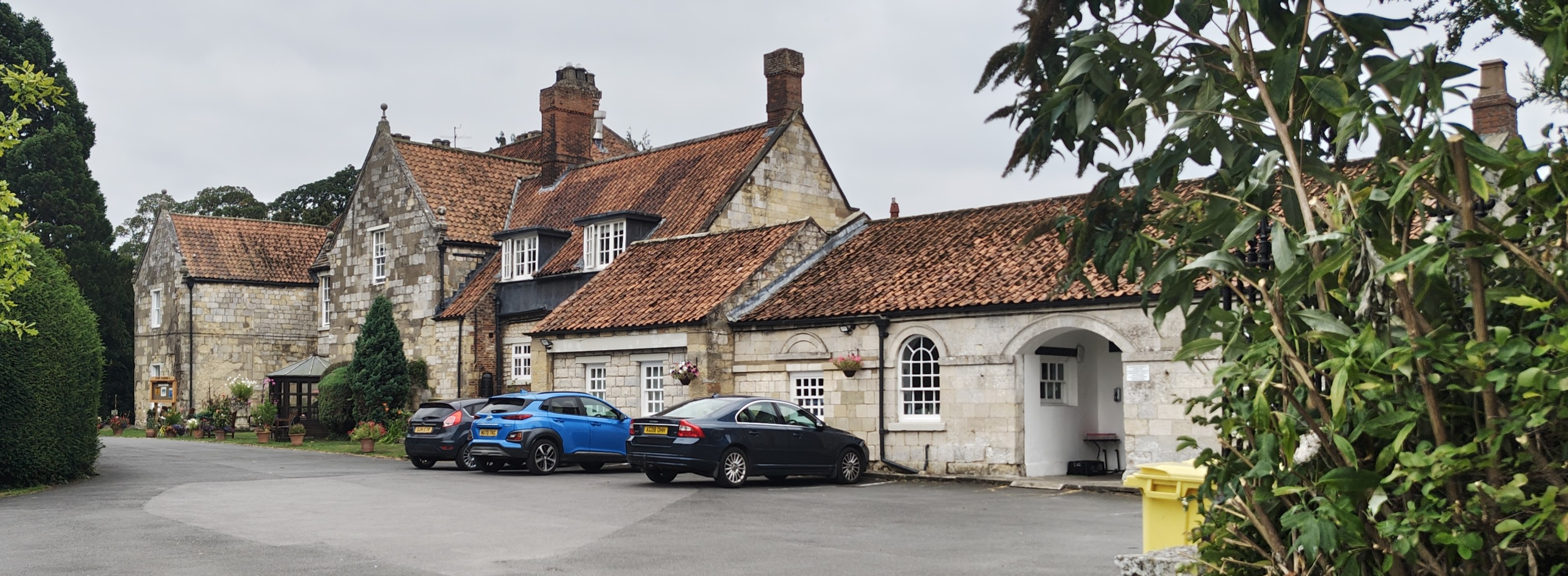
The building, in 2025

The Old Abbey, also known as Abbey House, is a historic building in Old Malton, a village in North Yorkshire, in England.

The building lies on part of the site of Malton Priory. Most of the priory was demolished following the Dissolution of the Monasteries, but the undercroft of the refectory survived. In the late 17th century, a house was constructed, using the undercroft as its basement. It was altered and extended in the late 18th century, the work including a new stable block. It was again altered and extended in the late 19th century, and in the 20th century. The building was grade II* listed in 1951. In 1988, it was converted into a residential care home for the elderly.

The original part of the house is built of sandstone, partly on a chamfered plinth, the rear wing is in orange-red brick, and the roofs are in pantile with a stone slate verge, coped gables, moulded kneelers, and ball and pedestal finials. It has two storeys and an attic, four bays, two-storey one-bay cross-wings, and rear wings. On the front is a doorway with a fanlight, a coved string course, and moulded eaves. Most of the windows are sashes, and there are two gabled dormers. The outbuildings include a stable block with one storey and an attic and four bays. It contains a segmental-arched opening, doorways and sash windows. Inside, there is an early staircase, the original kitchen fireplace, and several round-arched ovens. The undercroft is vaulted and has a stone bench on the west side, a mullioned window, former fireplace, and blocked tunnel.

== See also ==
- Grade II* listed buildings in North Yorkshire (district)
- Listed buildings in Malton, North Yorkshire (outer areas)
