= Vanbrugh Arch =

18th-century archway in Malton, North Yorkshire, United Kingdom

Coordinates: 54°08′03″N 0°48′03″W

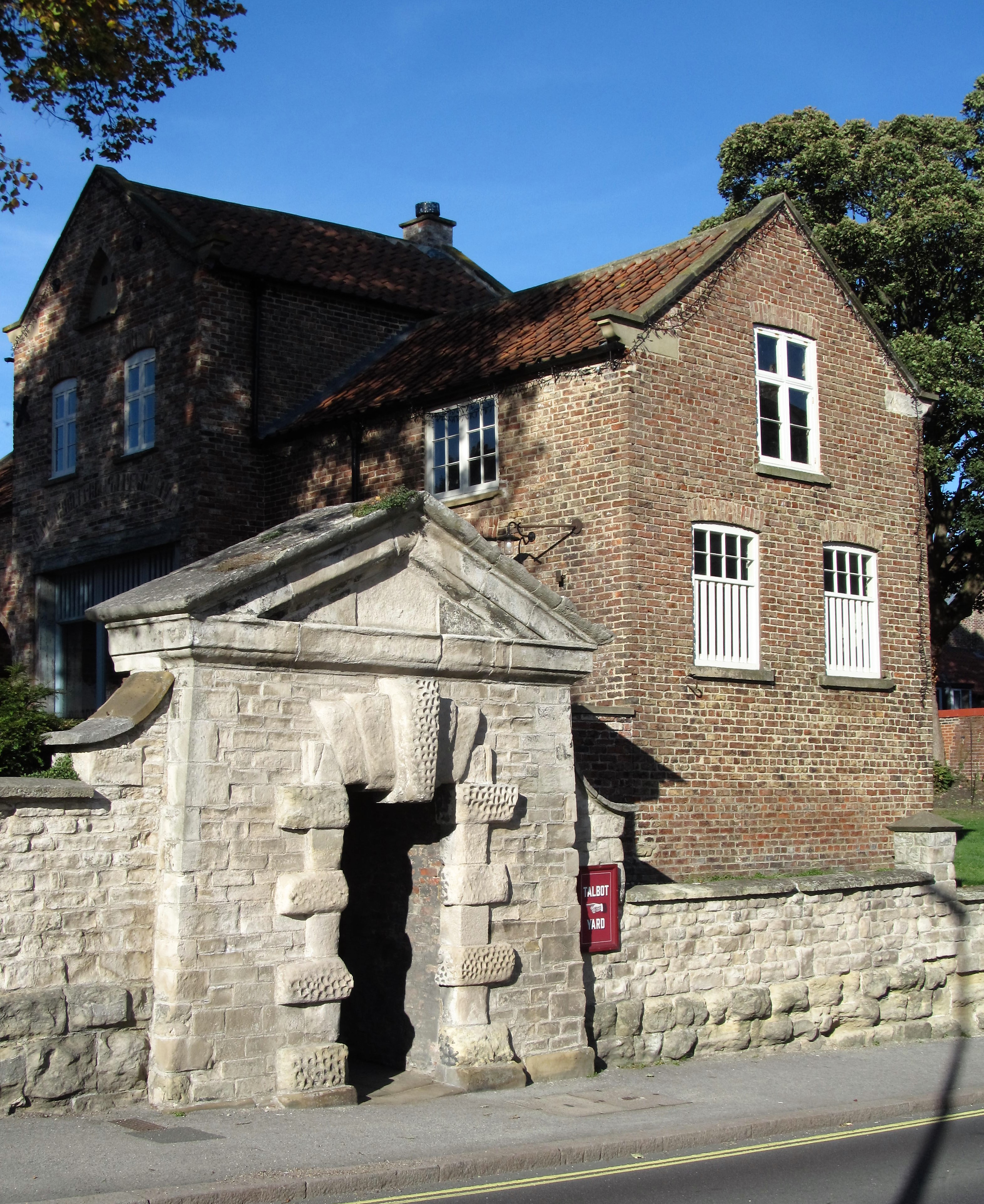
The arch, in 2018

The Vanbrugh Arch is a historic structure in Malton, North Yorkshire, a town in England.

The arch is believed to date from the first half of the 18th century, and to have been constructed as part of work either on York House or the neighbouring Talbot Hotel. It may have been the original principal entrance to the Talbot Hotel, or the entrance to a stable yard between the two properties. It is similar in style to a nearby gateway and a flight of steps, probably by the same designer. Its architect is not known with certainty, but it has been long associated with John Vanbrugh; it matches a design in one of Vanbrugh's sketchbooks, and is similar to an archway designed by Nicholas Hawksmoor under Vanbrugh's direction, at the Walled Garden, Castle Howard. It was moved to its current location in the 1800s, to provide access between the Talbot Hotel and its stable yard. It was listed in 1951, along with the retaining walls either side, and raised to grade II* in 2013.

The wall is built of limestone, with the lower courses in sandstone. It extends for about 45 metres (148 ft), it is up to 2 metres (6 ft 7 in) tall, and at intervals it contains square section piers with shallow pyramidal caps. The archway is in Hildenley limestone, and it has quoined jambs, the alternate ones vermiculated. The arch consists of five vermiculated voussoirs, and above it is a pediment with a moulded cornice.
