= The Royal Oak, Malton =

Pub in Old Malton, North Yorkshire, England

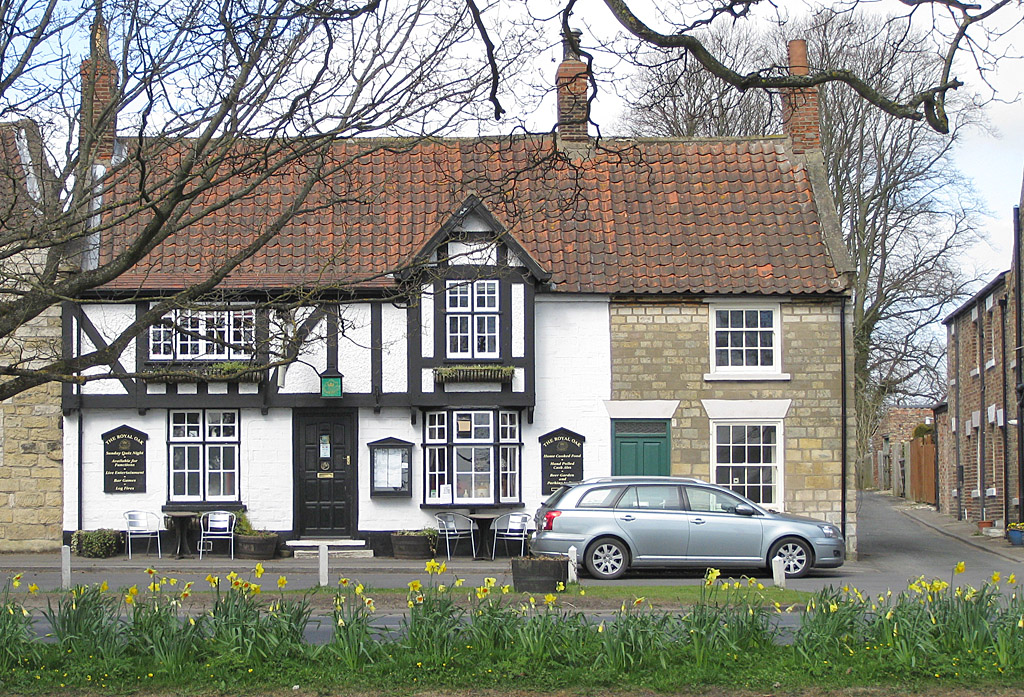
The pub, in 2013

The Royal Oak is a historic pub in Old Malton, a village in North Yorkshire, in England.

The Royal Oak was first registered as an alehouse in 1780. The current pub was constructed as part of a terrace of three cottages, probably in the early 19th century. The pub was altered after World War I, the work including the incorporation of one of the cottages, and the addition of mock timber framing to the front. The building was grade II listed in 1974. As of 2019, it operated as a free house and served "back to basics" pub food.

The public house and a cottage to its right have two storeys, and a pantile roof with coped gables and shaped kneelers. The pub is in painted rendered stone, with applied timber framing to the upper floor. There are three bays, the upper floor is jettied, and the right bay is gabled. The central doorway has a two-light window to its left, and a canted oriel window to the right. The window in the left bay on the upper floor has four lights, and the other windows are cross windows. The cottage is in stone, and has one bay. It contains a doorway to the left, and sash windows, the ground floor openings with wedge lintels. Inside, it has beamed ceilings, terracotta floor tiles, and two open fires.

== See also ==
- Listed buildings in Malton, North Yorkshire (outer areas)
