= Old Malton Mill =

Building in North Yorkshire, England

Coordinates: 54°09′21″N 0°47′13″W

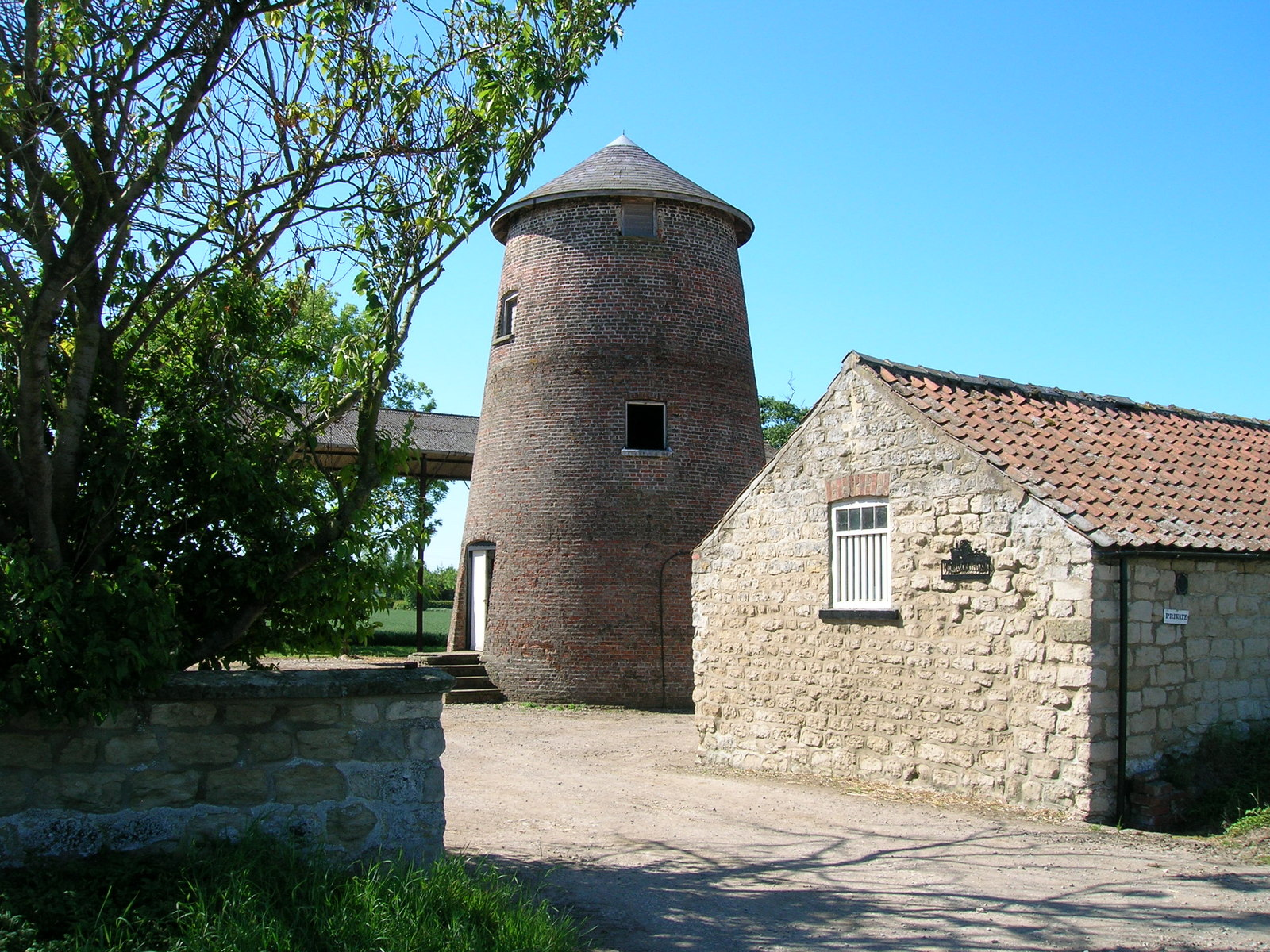
The windmill, in 2011

Old Malton Mill, also known as Old Malton Moor Mill, is a historic building near Old Malton, a village in North Yorkshire, in England.

A windmill was first recorded in 1780, although it is unclear whether this was the current building, which has the appearance of having been built about 1800. It was used to produce flour. By the 1840s, it was part of a group of buildings, which developed into Windmill Farm. Its sails were removed in 1902. The mill machinery was dismantled in about 1952, and the building has since been used for storage. It was grade II listed in 2023.

The mill is built of orange-red brick, and has a conical roof in Welsh slate with a lead cap finial. The windmill has a circular plan, it is tapering, and has four storeys. On the eastern side, steps lead up to a doorway, and above there are windows on each storey, some blocked. Inside, there is a timber staircase, a mid-20th century corn milling machine, a grain sump and a grain bin.

== See also ==
- Listed buildings in Malton, North Yorkshire (outer areas)
