= County Bridge =

County Bridge is the name of:

- County Bridge No. 36, in Pennsylvania, USA
- County Bridge No. 45, in Indiana, USA
- County Bridge No. 54, in Pennsylvania, USA
- County Bridge No. 101, in Pennsylvania, USA
- County Bridge No. 124, in Pennsylvania, USA
- County Bridge No. 148, in Pennsylvania, USA
- County Bridge No. 171, in Pennsylvania, USA
- County Bridge, Malton, in England
