= Kingsmill =

Kingsmill or Kingsmills may refer to:

== Places ==
- Kingsmill, Virginia, an area of James City County, Virginia, United States
- Kingsmill, County Armagh, Northern Ireland, site of the 1976 Kingsmill massacre
- Kingsmill, Ontario, Canada
- Kingsmill, Texas, a ghost town in the United States
- Kingsmill Islands or the Gilbert Islands
- Kingsmills Park, a football ground in Inverness, Scotland
- Kingsmill Resort, a resort near Williamsburg, Virginia

== Other uses ==
- Kingsmill (surname), a surname (and list of people with the surname)
- Kingsmill Bates (1916–2006), British naval officer
- Kingsmill (bread), a British brand of bread made by Associated British Foods
- HMS Kingsmill (K484) and later USS Kingsmill (DE-200), a frigate first commissioned in 1943
- Kingsmill (1798 ship), a British merchant vessel of the Age of Sail
- Kingsmill Championship, a women's professional golf tournament in the US
