= Malton Baptist Church =

Church building in Malton, North Yorkshire, England

Coordinates: 54°08′03″N 0°47′48″W

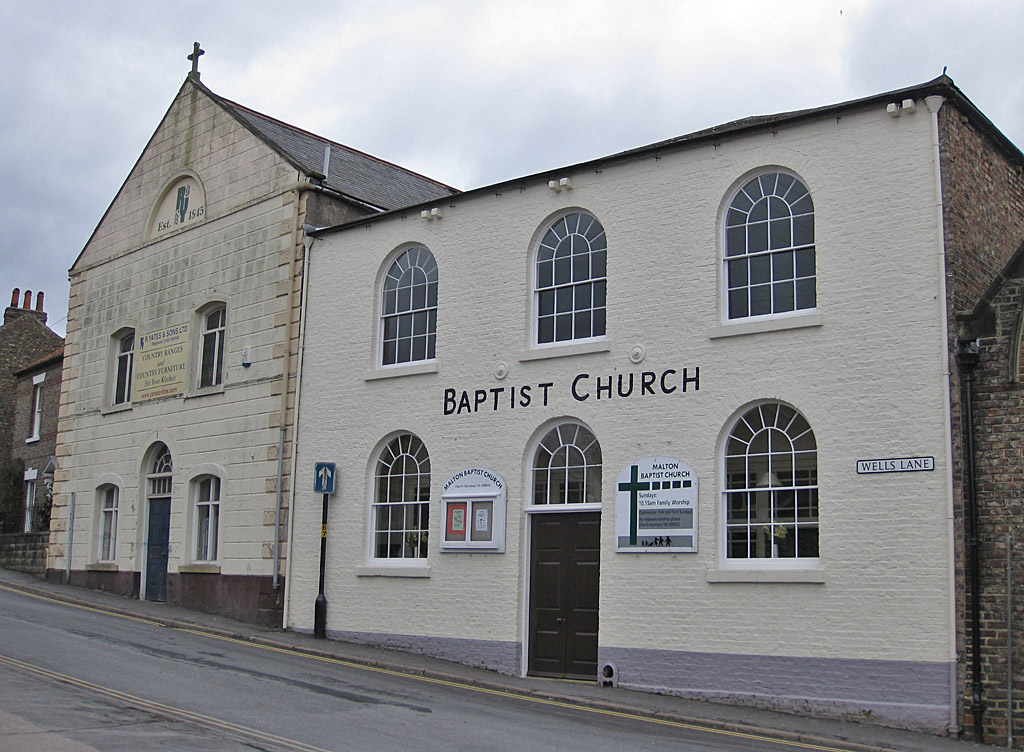
The building, in 2013

Malton Baptist Church is a historic building in Malton, North Yorkshire, a town in England.

In 1821, the Baptist Itinerant Society started preaching in Malton, and before the end of the year, six worshippers were baptised in the River Derwent. Regular services began in 1822, and funds were raised to construct a church on Wells Lane, with the foundation stone laid in 1823, and the building completed in 1824. By 1857, the church had 42 members, although its evening services attracted up to 80 worshippers. The chapel was extended to the rear in 1863. The building was grade II listed in 1974. The church closed in 2022, due to a declining congregation.

The church is in painted brick on the front, with pink and cream mottled brick on the right and at the rear, paired modillion eaves, and a hipped slate roof with wrought iron corner scrolls. There are two storeys and a front of three bays. In the centre is a doorway with a tall radial-glazed fanlight. The windows are sashes also with radial-glazed round heads. To the right of the doorway is an iron boot scraper.

== See also ==
- Listed buildings in Malton, North Yorkshire (outer areas)
