= Owston's Warehouse =

Warehouse in Malton, North Yorkshire, England

Coordinates: 54°08′01″N 0°47′56″W

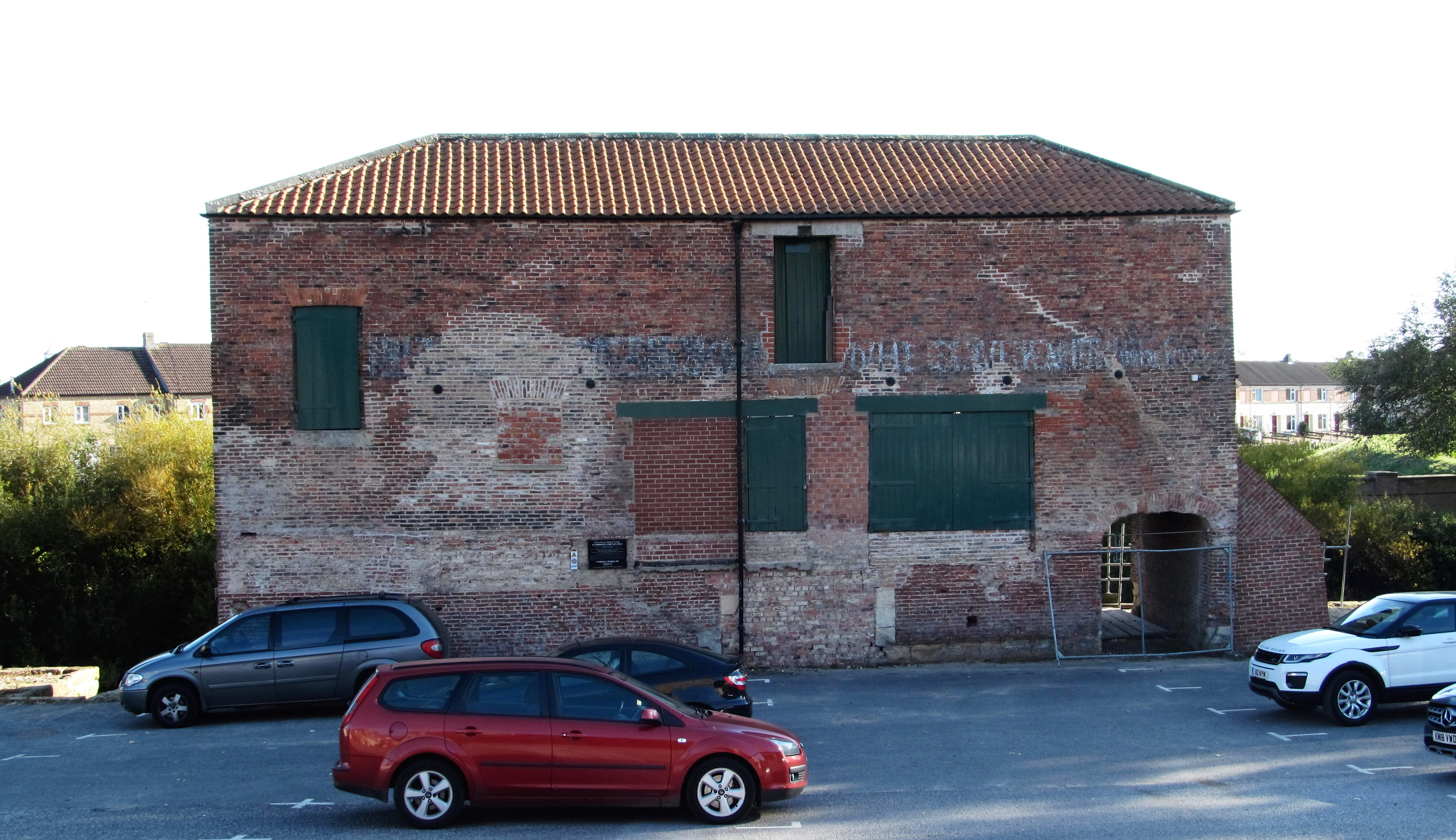
The building, in 2018

Owston's Warehouse is a historic building in Malton, North Yorkshire, a town in England.

A quay was built on the River Derwent in Malton in 1725, with a stone warehouse on it. In the late 18th century, a new warehouse was built adjoining the existing one. It was probably used to store corn, and may have been built for Mr Owston; he was recorded as the tenant in 1809. His yard extended back to Yorkersgate and included a maltings and other buildings to the rear. In the early 20th century, the ground floor openings were blocked up, and the level of the first floor was lowered by 34 inches (86 cm), while retaining the original timbers.

The warehouse is built of red brick with stone dressings and a hipped pantile roof. It has a rectangular plan, three storeys on the river front, two on the yard front, and seven bays. In the centre of the river front is a wide segmental-arched entrance, and there are windows with segmental arches on the current ground floor and flat arches on the upper floor. The yard front contains irregular openings. It has been grade II listed since 1979.

== See also ==
- Listed buildings in Malton, North Yorkshire (outer areas)
