= York House, Malton =

Listed building in North Yorkshire, England

York House
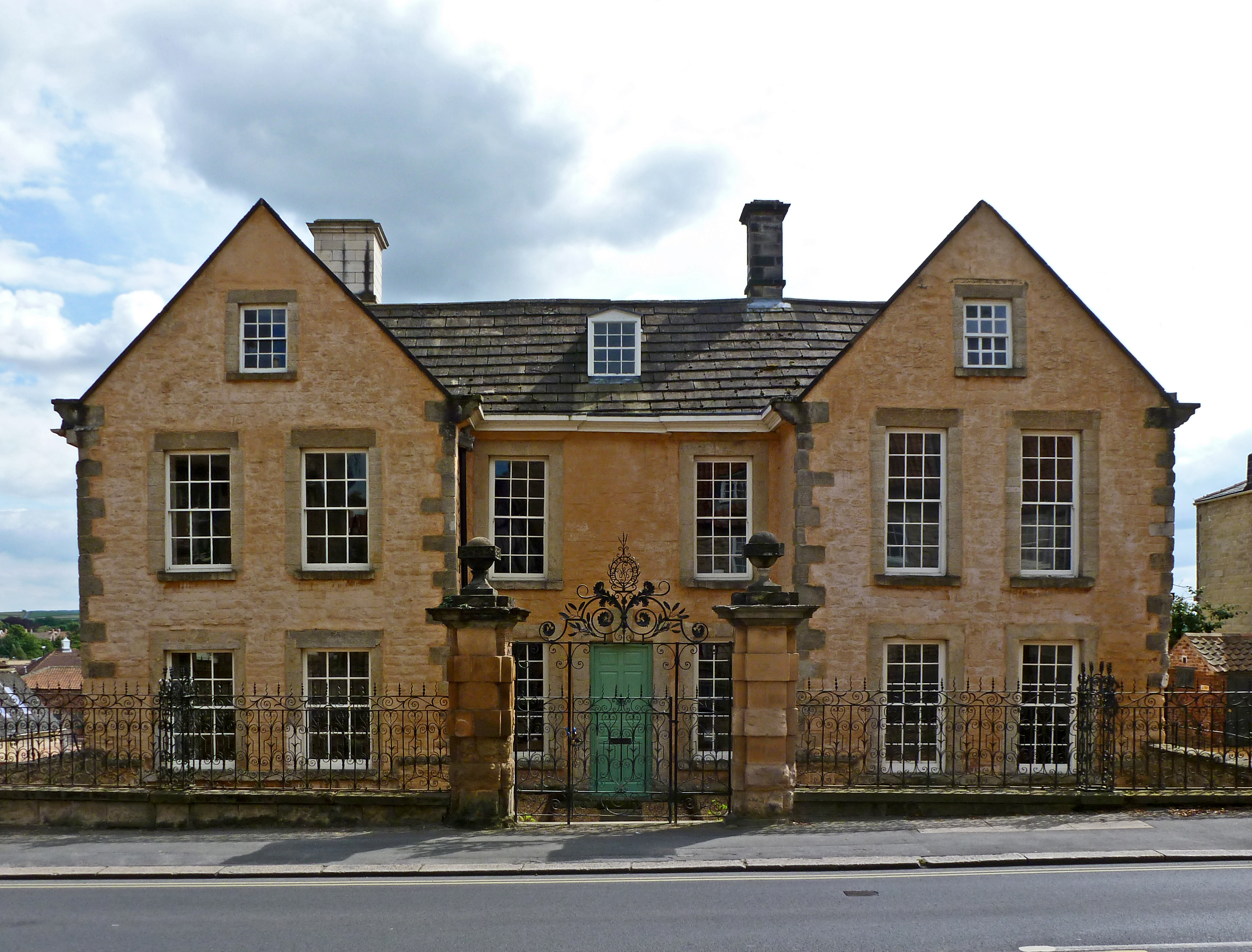
- The house in 2012
- Interactive map of York House

General information
- Location: Malton, North Yorkshire, England
- Coordinates: 54°08′02″N 0°47′59″W
- Completed: c. 1684
- Renovated: Early 18th century (partly rebuilt and garden extended)

Technical details
- Floor count: 2 + attic
- Designations

Listed Building – Grade II*
- Official name: York House
- Designated: 29 September 1951
- Reference no.: 1290865

Listed Building – Grade II*
- Official name: Forecourt walls, piers, gates and railings to the front York House
- Designated: 29 September 1951
- Reference no.: 1202749

York House is a historic building in Malton, North Yorkshire, a town in England.

The core of the building was probably constructed in the 15th century, within the town walls. It was rebuilt in about 1684, perhaps for William Strickland or Ralph Elwes. It was partly rebuilt in the early 18th century, when the centre of the garden front was brought forward. It had substantial gardens, which survive largely intact. The building was Grade II* listed in 1951, and the wall and railings in front of it are separately Grade II* listed. The history of the building is linked to that of the neighbouring Talbot Hotel, and the house currently forms an annexe to the hotel.

The house is built of sandstone, with a stone slate roof, coped gables and shaped kneelers. It has two storeys and an attic, and an H-shaped plan, with a centre range of two bays, and flanking gabled cross-wings, on a chamfered plinth. In the centre is a doorway with an eared architrave and a keystone, above it is a coved eaves course, and a moulded eaves cornice, and in the attic is a gabled dormer. The wings have quoins and sillbands. In the centre at the rear is a giant round-headed arch with a rusticated and quoined surround. The windows in all parts are sashes in architraves. Inside, the entrance hall retains an early 18th-century paved floor, and early panelling and staircases also survive.

The wall in front of the house is built of stone, about 0.5 metres (1 ft 8 in) tall, with cambered coping, ending in square piers with a moulded cornice and pyramidal cap. The gate piers are square, with rebated angles and banded rustication, each with a moulded cornice, a stepped cap, and a ball and pedestal finial with a band of vermiculated rustication. The gates, overthrow and railings are in wrought iron, and highly ornamented.

== See also ==
- Grade II* listed buildings in North Yorkshire (district)
- Listed buildings in Malton, North Yorkshire (outer areas)
