= Malton Lodge =

Listed building in North Yorkshire, England

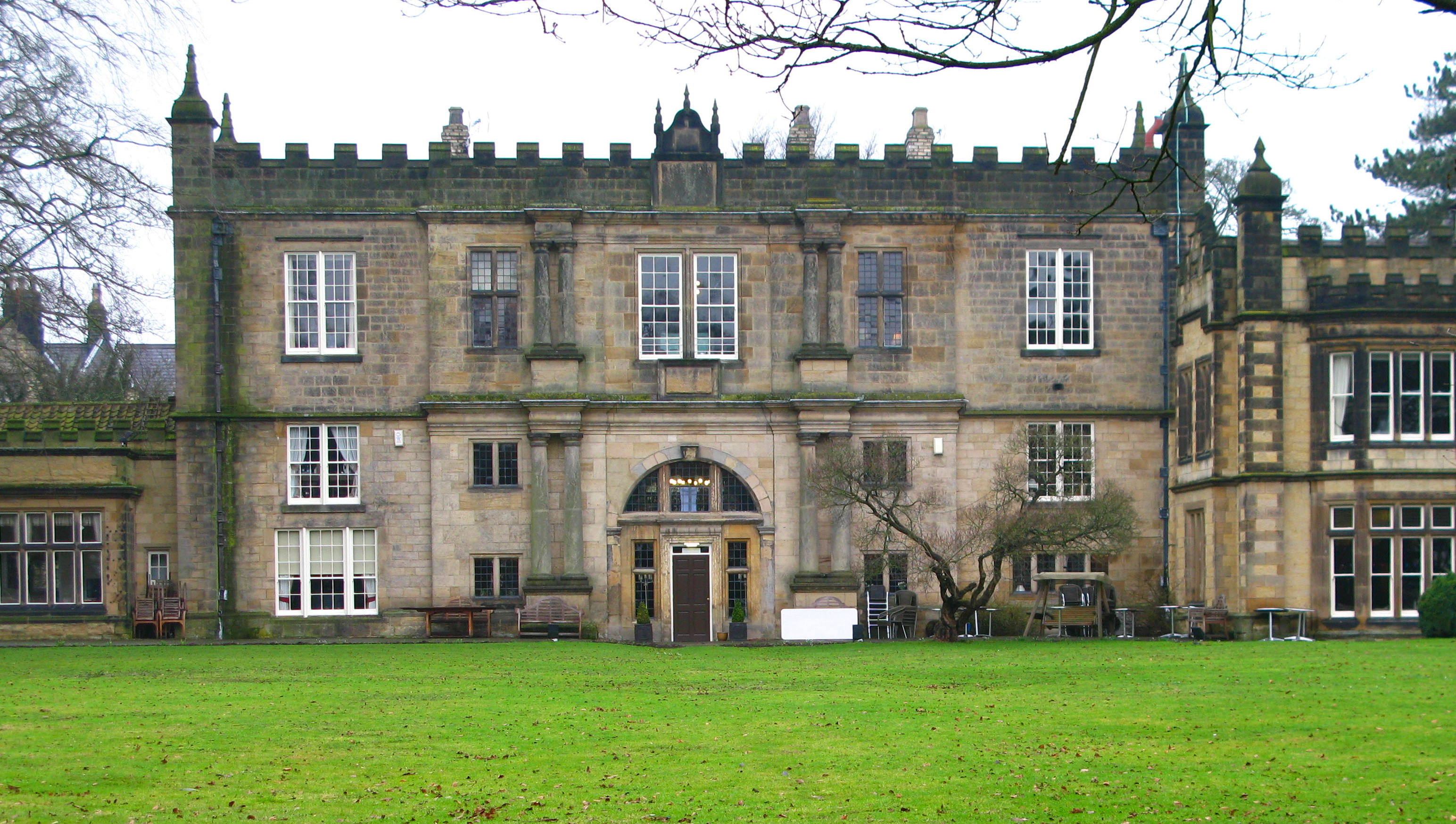
- The building in 2011
- Alternative names: Old Lodge

General information
- Address: Malton, North Yorkshire, England
- Coordinates: 54.1356°N 0.7926°W
- Completed: 1604
- Renovated: c. 1675 (altered) c. 1834 and 1878 (extended)

Technical details
- Floor count: 1 / 2
- Designations

Listed Building – Grade II*
- Official name: Malton Lodge
- Designated: 29 September 1951
- Reference no.: 1201941

Malton Lodge, also known as the Old Lodge, is a historic building in Malton, North Yorkshire, a town in England.

In 1569, Ralph Eure, 3rd Baron Eure built a large house on the site of Malton Castle. His family constructed a gatehouse to the property in 1604. In 1674, the main house was demolished, but the gatehouse was retained and altered to form "Malton Lodge". In about 1834, it was extended on both sides, and in 1878 it was again extended to the left, with outbuildings further to the left. The building was Grade II* listed in 1951. It currently serves as a hotel.

The building is constructed of sandstone with a pantile roof. The entrance front has two storeys and five bays, with a one-storey three-bay extension to the right, a two-storey two bay extension to the left, and later extensions further to the left. The middle three bays of the entrance front project, and have paired Tuscan and Doric columns, a moulded string course, a moulded eaves cornice and an embattled parapet flanked by ogee-headed turrets. In the centre of the front is a round arch with a keystone, and an inserted doorway and lunette. Most of the windows are mullioned, some with hood moulds, and in the centre of the parapet is a panel with a moulded surround. Inside, there are two 17th-century staircases and Jacobean woodwork including an elaborate fireplace.

A 70-metre (230 ft) stretch of the screen wall to the outer forecourt of the former house survives in the grounds of the lodge, and is separately Grade II* listed. The wall is built of sandstone with sloped coping, and is about 5 metres (16 ft) tall, rising to 6.5 metres (21 ft) over the arches. In the centre is a round arch of voussoirs, now partly blocked, with paired pilasters on bulbous moulded pedestals, imposts, a frieze and a moulded projecting cornice. To the left is an elliptical arch between pilaster buttresses.

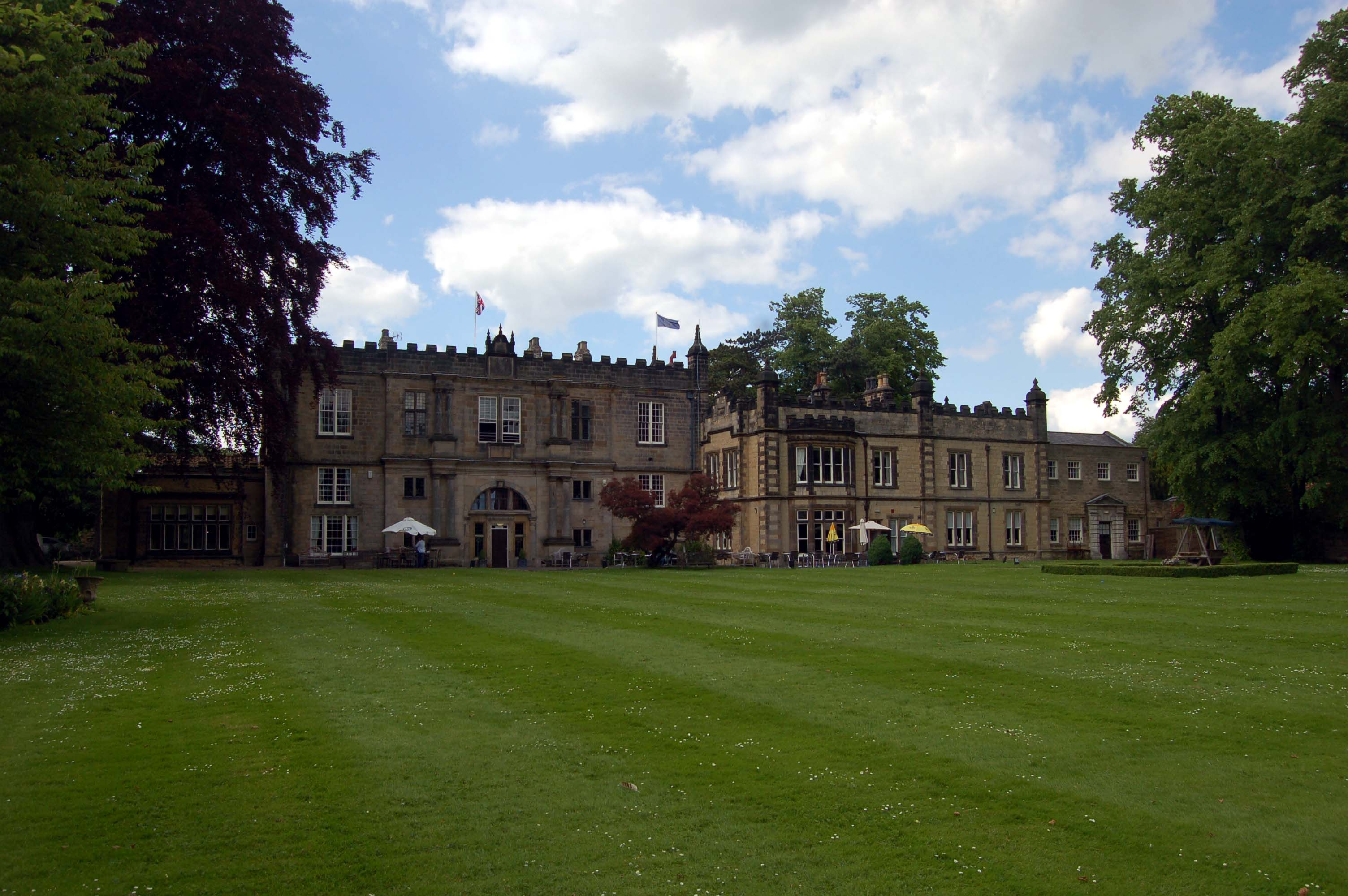
The building, with extensions

== See also ==
- Grade II* listed buildings in North Yorkshire (district)
- Listed buildings in Malton, North Yorkshire (outer areas)
