= The Cornmill =

Building in Malton, North Yorkshire, England

Coordinates: 54°08′01″N 0°47′49″W

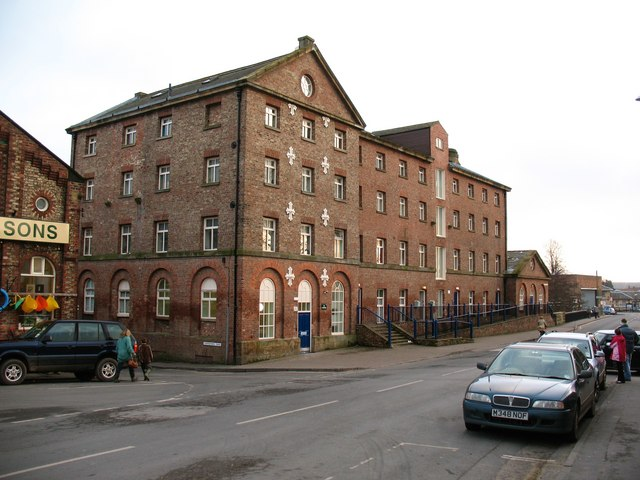
The building, in 2009

The Cornmill is a historic building in Malton, North Yorkshire, a town in England.

A large corn mill lay on the River Derwent in Malton, but its power relied on a weir which impeded shipping. As a result, it was removed in 1845, and the mill was demolished. The owner, Hurtley and Sons, adapted the early 18th century Derwent Navigation building into a new mill. The company later moved to Kingston upon Hull, and in 1887 the building was adapted for use by the newly-founded Malton Biscuit Company. This was not a success, and closed in 1894. The building next served as the offices and warehouse of the Brandsby Agricultural Trading Association, before being converted into flats. In 2018, the flats were purchased by Impact Living, restored, and let to people with physical and mental health conditions. The building has been grade II listed since 1992.

The building is constructed of pink and cream mottled brick on a sandstone plinth, with dressings in orange-red brick, a sill band, a moulded eaves cornice, and a slate roof. The main block has four storeys and eight bays and a central five-storey gabled bay. To the left is a cross-wing with four storeys and three bays, under a pediment containing an oculus, and there is a single-storey three-bay boiler house. The ground floor of the wing has three recessed arched openings, the middle one with a doorway, and the outer ones with windows. Most of the windows in the building are cross windows.

== See also ==
- Listed buildings in Malton, North Yorkshire (outer areas)
