= Talbot Hotel, Malton =

Hotel in Malton, North Yorkshire, England

Coordinates: 54.1340°N 0.8004°W

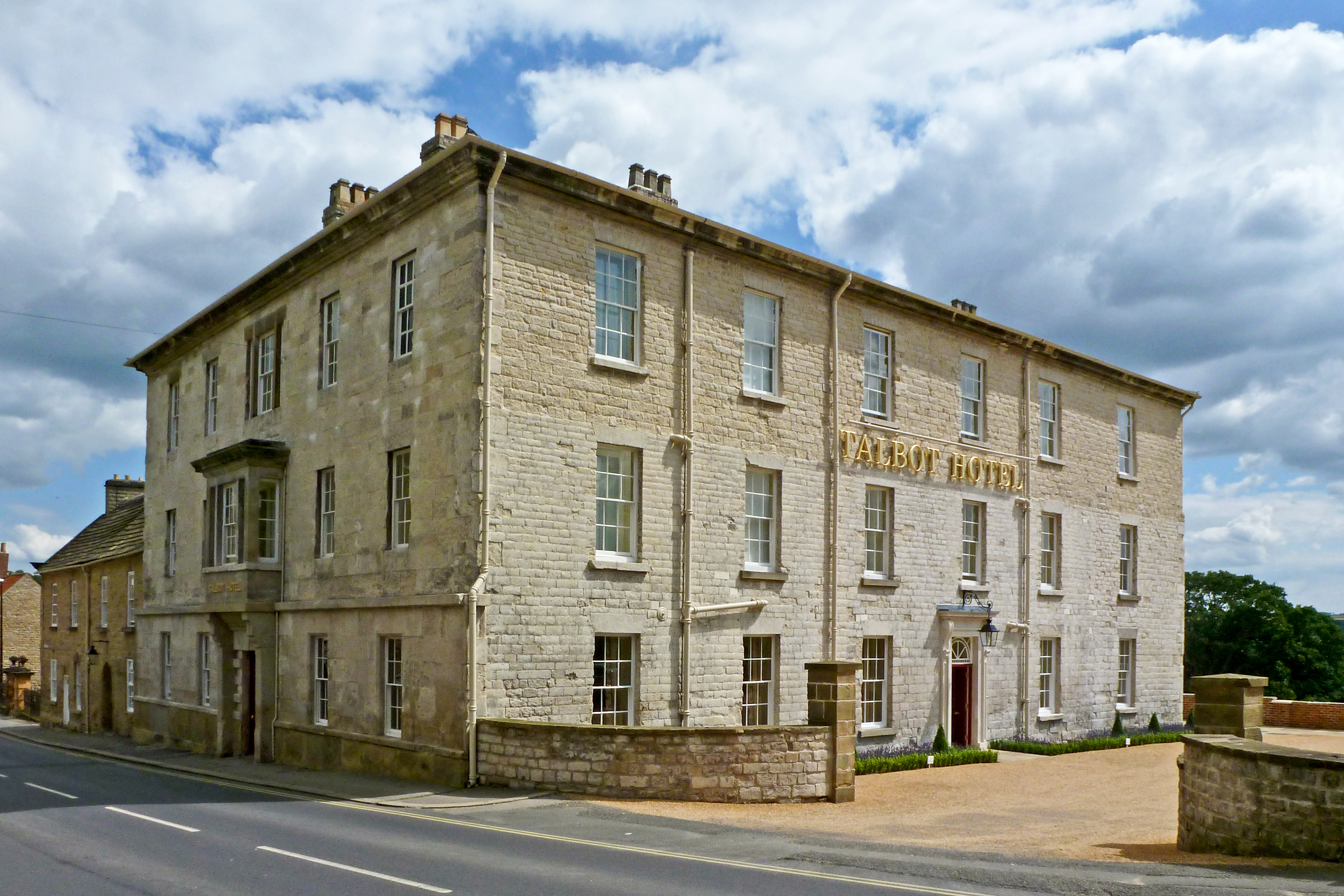
The building, in 2012

The Talbot Hotel is a historic building in Malton, North Yorkshire, a town in England.

The building straddles the line of the town wall, and the Malton Buildings Group argues that part of the wall may survive in its basement. A large house stood on the site by 1599, elements of which may also survive in the basement. It was purchased by the Strickland baronets in 1672, and was generally used as a guest house for friends of the family visiting the town to hunt and race horses. Between 1740 and 1743, it was converted into a coaching inn. Its first landlord was Walter Baldock, formerly of the town's Talbot Inn, and he named the new business as the "New Talbot Inn". The west wing was extended in about 1775, and in 1808 a third storey was added. By this time, it was served by stagecoaches to Leeds, York, Scarborough and Whitby, and it became known as the "Talbot Hotel". The main block was remodelled in about 1840, and in the 1870s a billiard room was added. In 1946, the hotel was leased to Trust Houses Ltd, which incorporated three neighbouring houses into the property, increasing the total number of bedrooms from 16 to 26. The hotel was grade II* listed in 1951. It was refurbished between 2010 and 2012 and was thereafter managed by the Fitzwilliam Malton Estate. For three years, the hotel's menus were overseen by James Martin.

The hotel is mainly built of rendered stone, with pink and cream mottled brick at the rear, quoins, a moulded eaves cornice and a hipped slate roof with iron corner scrolls. It consists of four ranges around a courtyard, and has three storeys. The entrance front has six bays, and contains a doorway with a plain surround and a radial fanlight. The windows are sashes with flat arches of voussoirs. The front facing Yorkersgate has five bays, and a two-story two-bay wing to the left. In the centre is a doorcase flanked by square piers, and with a plain cornice on moulded corbels. The doorway has a rusticated surround, and a flat arch of voussoirs with a keystone. Above the doorway is a square bay window containing a tripartite sash window under a projecting moulded cornice, and the other windows are sashes.

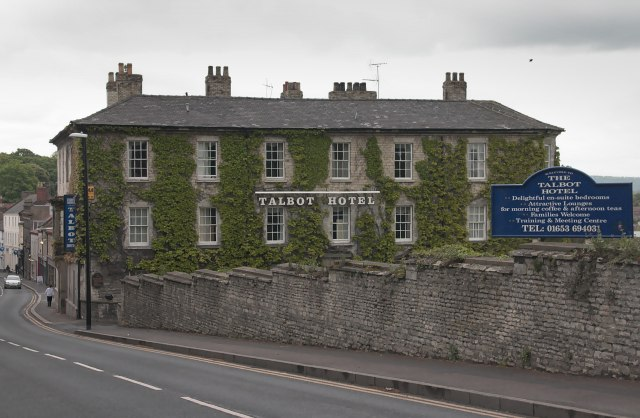
The garden wall

The garden wall and gateways, and retaining wall and steps to the west of the hotel are separately grade II* listed. They resemble the nearby Vanbrugh Arch, and so are suspected of having been designed by John Vanbrugh. The inner face of the garden wall is mainly in red brick, the outer face is mainly in limestone, and it has flat coping. The wall is about 2.5 metres (8 ft 2 in) tall, and runs northwest for about 100 metres (330 ft), then south for about 30 metres (98 ft). It contains two square-headed archways in Hildenley limestone. The archway facing the entrance to the hotel is ornamented, it has radiating voussoirs and heavily rusticated jambs, and is infilled with stone and brick. To the west is another similar, but less ornamented arch, which is not infilled. The retaining wall and staircase are in Hildenley limestone. The terrace wall extends for about 60 metres (200 ft), and has cambered coping, and pilaster buttresses that form piers. The staircase makes a quarter turn, it has raked parapet walls with chamfered coping, and it ends in cylindrical piers with shallow domed tops. It is flanked by raked screen walls with square piers. At the head of the staircase is a short flight of simpler steps.

== See also ==
- Grade II* listed buildings in North Yorkshire (district)
- Listed buildings in Malton, North Yorkshire (outer areas)
