= King's Mill, Malton =

Watermill in Malton, North Yorkshire, England

Coordinates: 54°08′00″N 0°47′19″W

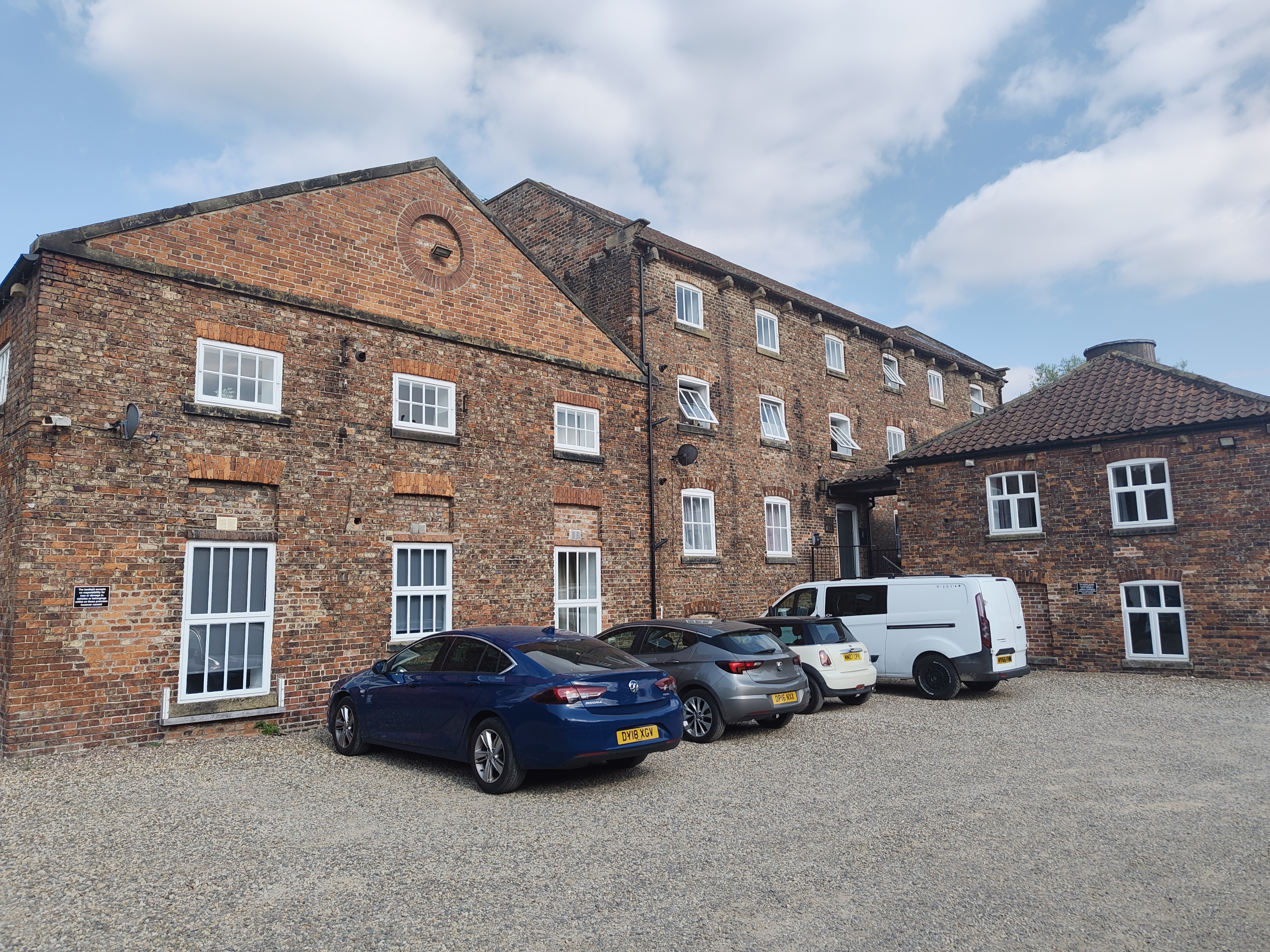
The mill, in 2025

King's Mill is a historic building in Malton, North Yorkshire, a town in England.

The watermill was built in the late 18th century, to grind corn. Its wheel was driven by the River Derwent. It suffered a serious fire, and was largely rebuilt in 1802. Between 1846 and 1848, it was extended, to a design by J. P. Pritchett. The mill closed in the 20th century, and the building was grade II listed in 1978. By 1990, it was partly derelict, but it was converted into flats at the end of the century.

The mill is built of red brick with stone dressings, and has a pantile roof with stone copings and kneelers. The main block has four storeys and six bays, to the left is an extension with three storeys, three bays and a pedimented gable containing a blind oculus, and at right angles on the right is a kiln house with two storeys, two bays and a pyramidal roof. The openings in the main range have segmental heads.

== See also ==
- Listed buildings in Malton, North Yorkshire (outer areas)
