= The Maltings, Malton =

Building in Malton, North Yorkshire, England

Coordinates: 54°08′03″N 0°47′43″W

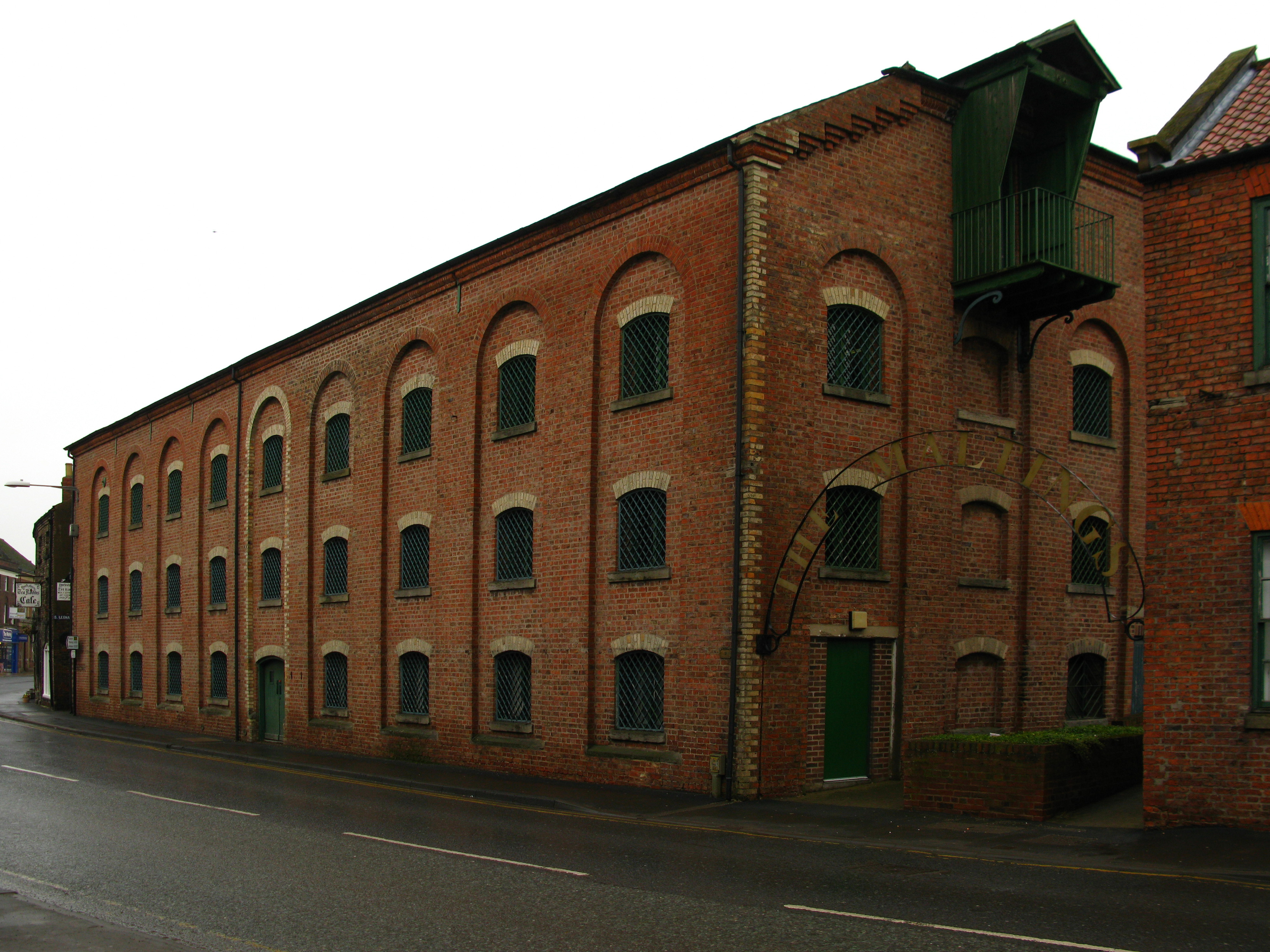
The building, in 2011

The Maltings is a historic building in Malton, North Yorkshire, a town in England.

The Old Brewery was established in Malton in 1767, becoming known as Rose's Brewery in the 20th century. In the mid to late 19th century, it constructed a substantial brewery building on Castlegate. In 1965, the brewery was taken over by Tetley's Brewery, and it closed in 1969. The building was grade II listed in 1991, and around that time, it was converted into a business centre.

The building is built of pink and cream mottled brick, with dressings in cream brick, an eaves course of orange-red moulded brick, a moulded eaves cornice, and a half-hipped slate roof with wrought iron corner scrolls. There are three storeys, a front of nine bays, four bays on the left return, and three on the right return. On each front, every bay contains a blind recessed full-height arch. The middle bay on the main front has a quoined surround, and contains a segmental-arched doorway. Elsewhere, every arch contains a segmental-arched window on each floor. In the top storey of the right return is a cast iron lifting platform with iron railings on scrolled iron brackets, in gabled timber housing.

== See also ==
- Listed buildings in Malton, North Yorkshire (outer areas)
