= County Bridge, Malton =

Bridge in Malton, North Yorkshire, England, UK

Coordinates: 54°07′59″N 0°47′28″W

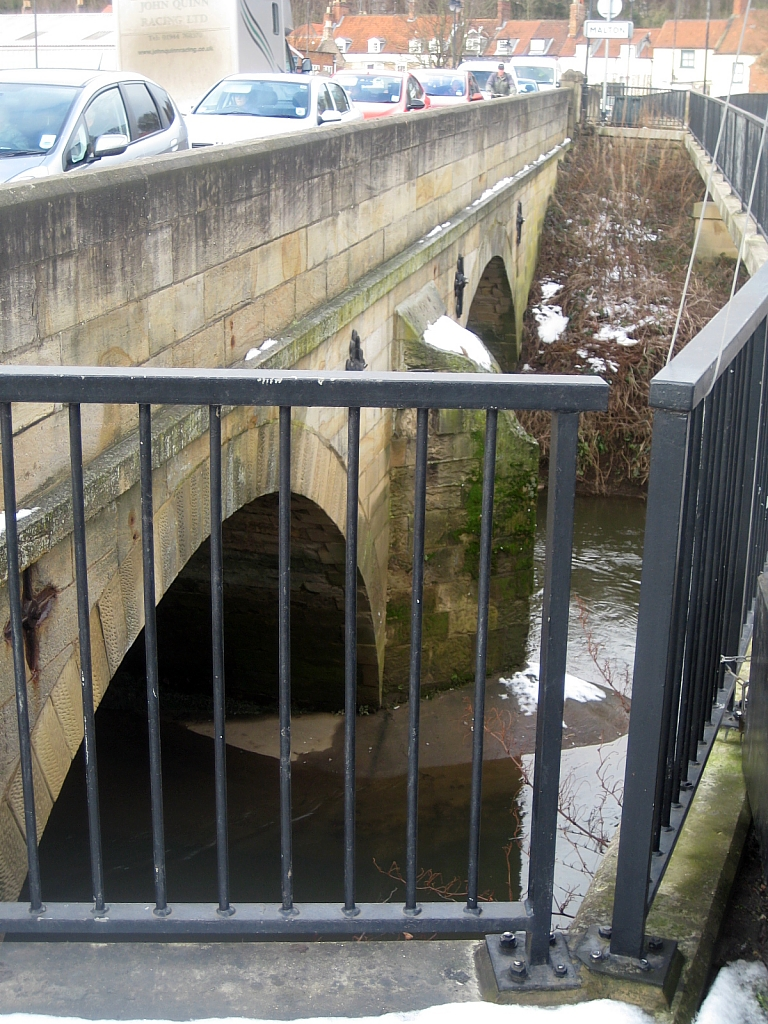
The bridge, in 2012

County Bridge, also known as Malton Bridge, is a bridge in England which connects the town of Malton, North Yorkshire with Norton-on-Derwent.

A bridge crossing the River Derwent at this location was recorded as being repaired in 1332. It was repaired at the cost of £100 in 1612, and in 1736 its parapets were repaired. The current bridge was constructed in about 1760, to a design probably by John Carr. It was widened in 1925, when a footpath was added, but later in the century a separate footbridge was constructed alongside. The bridge was grade II listed in 1974.

The bridge carries Castlegate (the B1248 road) over the river and a mid-stream island. It is built of sandstone, and consists of three segmental arches of voussoirs. There are mouldings on the downstream side, a raised chamfered band on the upstream side, cutwaters, and a plain chamfered parapet. A concrete walkway with railings has been added.

== See also ==
- Listed buildings in Malton, North Yorkshire (outer areas)
