= Malton Priory =

Church in North Yorkshire, England

Coordinates: 54.1425°N 0.7791°W

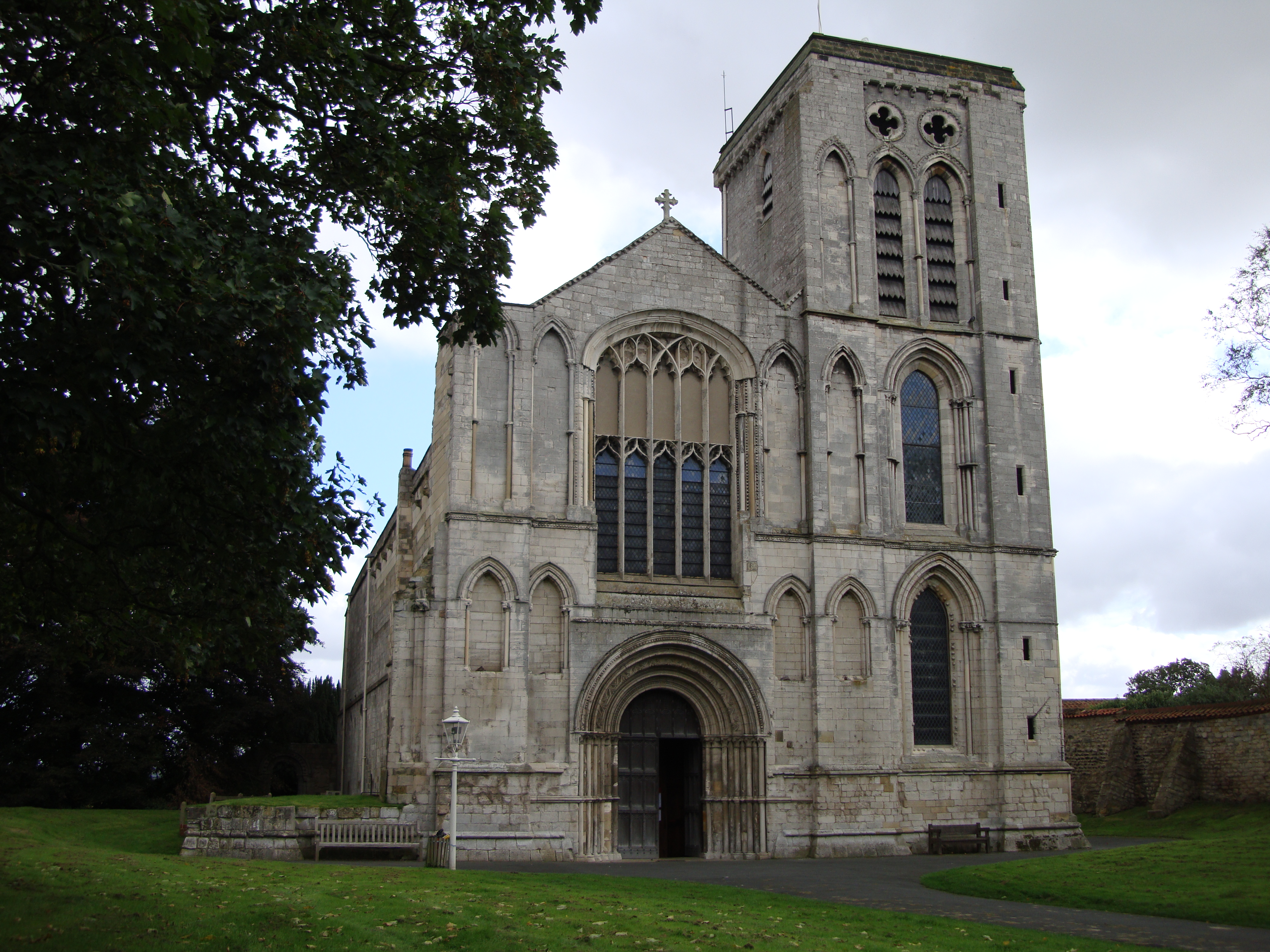
- West front of Malton Priory church
- Interactive map of Malton Priory

Monastery information
- Other name: St Mary's Priory Church
- Order: Gilbertine
- Denomination: Church of England (formerly Roman Catholic)
- Established: 1150
- Disestablished: December 1539

People
- Founder: Eustace fitz John

Site
- Location: Malton, North Yorkshire, England
- Grid reference: SE 79861 72549

Malton Priory, Old Malton, North Yorkshire, England, is near to the town of Malton. It was founded as a monastery of the Gilbertine Order by Eustace fitz John, the lord of Malton Castle. Fitz John founded both Malton Priory and Watton Priory around 1150; some sources suggest that this was an act of penance for his support for the Scots in the Battle of the Standard.

The prior was accused of taking part in the Pilgrimage of Grace.

After the Dissolution, the site was bought in 1540 by Robert Holgate, the former master of the Gilbertine Order, who was then Bishop of Llandaff. In 1545 Holgate became Archbishop of York. He founded three grammar schools in Yorkshire, including Malton School (on part of the monastic site).

== Priory church ==
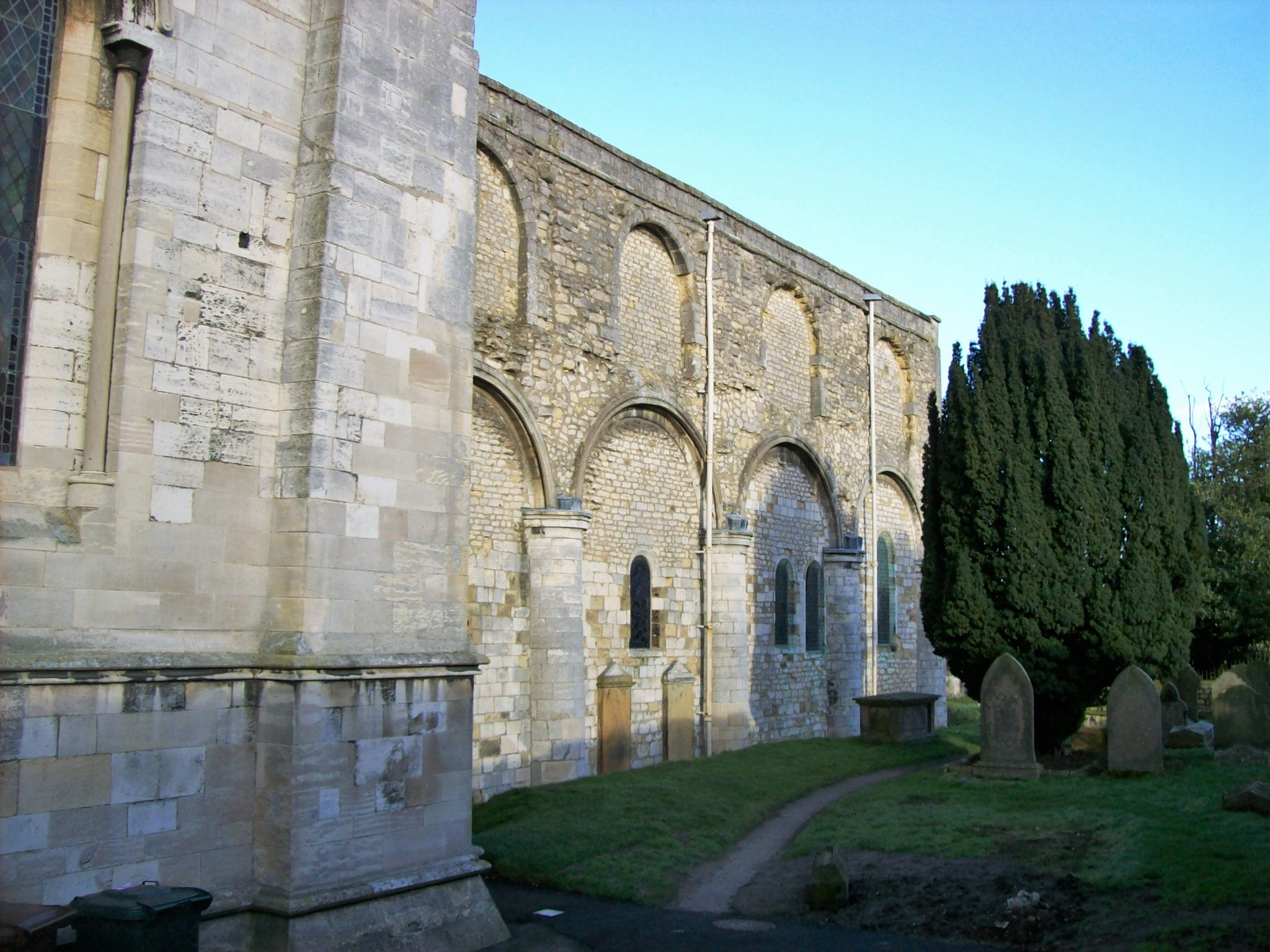
The blocked south arcades, looking east

The priory's main surviving building is the church, which is now a parish church. It is the only church of the Gilbertine Order still in regular use. The undercroft of the refectory also survives, incorporated into the Old Abbey house.

The priory church is much abused, though impressive. The depletion of the church was gradual. For example; the upper level of the nave (the clerestory) was removed and the roof lowered in the 1730s. This alteration is not immediately apparent as the west front retains its full height, the only clue being the blocked upper portions of the main west window.

What now remains is the lowered nave and one of the original two west towers. The nave aisles, crossing tower, transepts and chancel have all long since vanished, for the most part. However, the lower parts of some of the original chancel pillars survive as ruins east of the nave, as do the remains of a chapel (including archway, bits of two walls, a piscina and a corner shaft) which once led off from the south side of the chancel.

The nave still shows evidence of a serious fire in 1500 which led to a partial rebuilding. There was also a major restoration in the nineteenth century by Temple Moore.

== Burials ==
- William de Aton, 2nd Baron Aton
- William FitzHugh, 4th Baron FitzHugh

== See also ==
- List of monastic houses in North Yorkshire
- List of monastic houses in England
- List of English abbeys, priories and friaries serving as parish churches
- Grade I listed buildings in North Yorkshire (district)
- Listed buildings in Malton, North Yorkshire (outer areas)
