= Kingsmill (surname) =

Kingsmill is a surname. Notable people with the name include:

== 15th century ==
- Sir John Kingsmill (judge) (1465–1509), Justice of the Common Pleas
- Sir John Kingsmill (high sheriff) (died 1556), High Sheriff of Hampshire

== 16th century ==
- Richard Kingsmill (MP) (c. 1528-1600), English politician
- William Kingsmill (priest) (died 1549), English clergyman, last Prior of Winchester, first Dean of Winchester, 1541–1549

== 17th century ==
- Anne Finch, Countess of Winchilsea (born Anne Kingsmill; 1661–1720), English poet

== 18th century ==
- Sir Robert Kingsmill, 1st Baronet (1730–1805), Royal Navy admiral

== 19th century ==
- Thomas Kingsmill Abbott (1829–1913), Irish scholar and educator and chair at Trinity College Dublin
- Walter Kingsmill (1864–1935), Australian politician
- Hugh Kingsmill (1889–1949), British writer and journalist
- Charles Kingsmill (1855–1935), Canadian admiral

== 20th century ==
- William Kingsmill (politician) (1905–1971), British soldier, businessman, Conservative Member of Parliament for Yeovil from 1945 to 1951
- John Kingsmill (1920–2013), Australian author and actor
- Richard Kingsmill (born 1964), Australian music journalist
- Mark Kingsmill (born 1956), Australian musician, member of the Hoodoo Gurus band
