= Kings Mill, Stamford =

Grade II listed building in the United Kingdom

Coordinates: 52°39′00″N 0°28′58″W

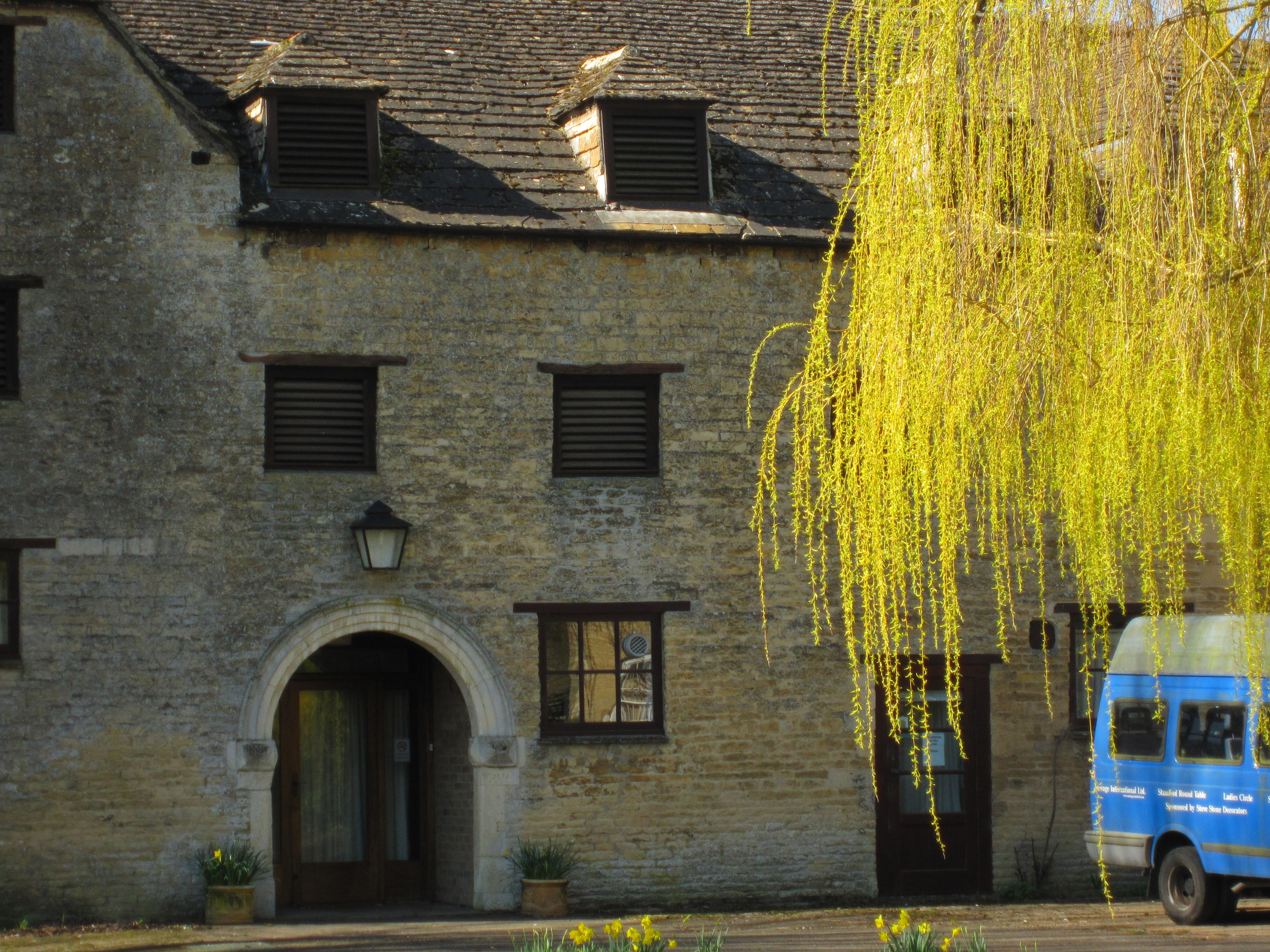
King's Mill Centre, Stamford

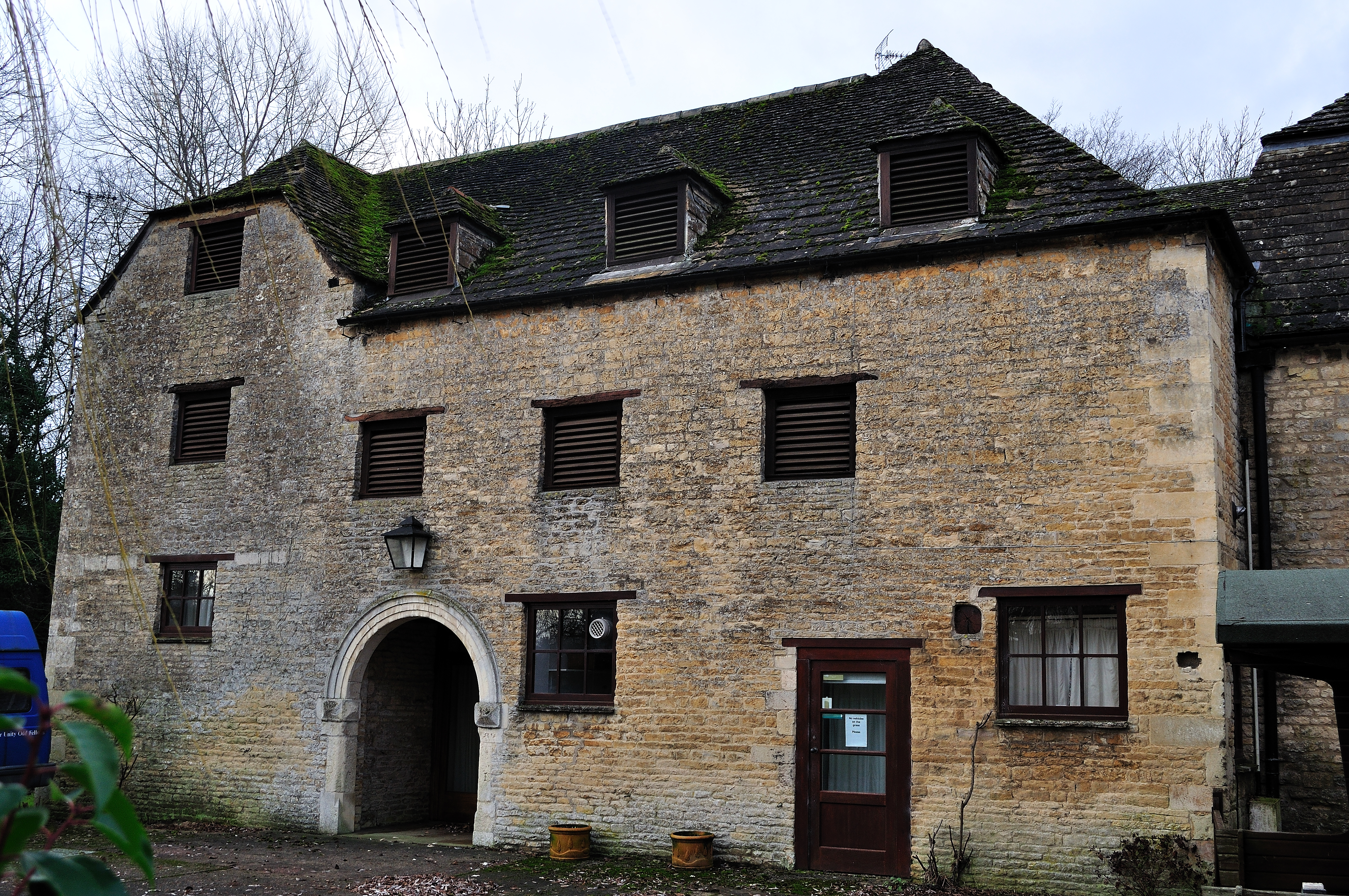
King's Mill Centre, a former watermill

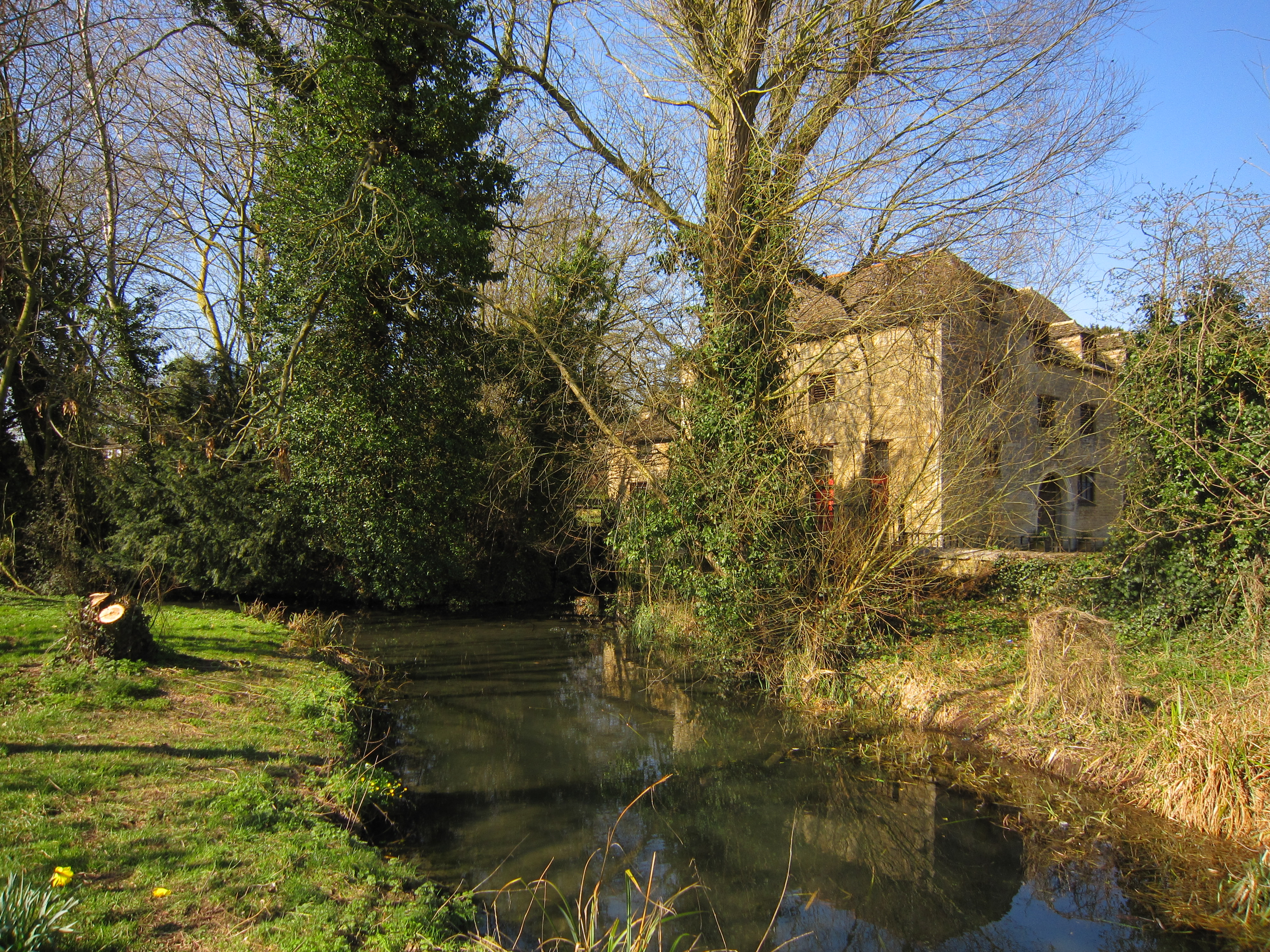
King's Mill from the meadows, over the millstream

King's Mill is a former watermill on Bath Row, Stamford, Lincolnshire, England, at the bottom of the sloping road called St Peter's Vale. There is said to have been a mill on this site at the time of the Domesday survey, and took the name 'King's Mill' in the time of King John. The present building dates from the seventeenth century, and is a Grade II listed building. In 1967, it was converted into a day care centre before being refurbished by Burghley Estates in 2018. The building is currently divided between private accommodation and King's Mill Centre, the offices of Bishopsgate Corporate Finance Ltd and BCF Private Equity.

The millstream or leat separates the town from the Meadows at Bath Row, rejoining the River Welland just before the town bridge. The embankment for the upper reaches of the mill stream forms Melancholy Walk overlooking the upper meadows, where cattle are still sometimes grazed. The weir and sluice for the leat were replaced when the large pumping station for Rutland Water was built near the modern A1 bridge over the Welland. The line of the leat follow part of the line of the town walls.
