= Malton Castle =

Former castle in North Yorkshire, England

- Malton, North Yorkshire

Site information
- Condition: Fragmentary remains

Location
- Coordinates: 54.13469°N 0.79192°W

Malton Castle was a castle in Malton, North Yorkshire, England. A wooden motte and bailey castle was built by William Tyson, lord of Alnwick in the 11th century, on the site of the Roman fort of Derventio Brigantum. The castle was given to Eustace Fitz John, who rebuilt it in stone.

Eustace negotiated the delivery of the castle to King David I of Scotland in 1138. The Scots garrisoned the castle, however it was captured later the same year. King Richard I of England visited the castle in 1189 and King Edward II of England in 1307. When Eustace de Vesci rebelled against King John in 1212, he gave orders to destroy (slight) de Vesci's castles at Malton and Alnwick. The castle was held against King John of England, during the First Barons' War. After the battle of Old Byland the castle was captured and destroyed by King Robert I of Scotland in 1322. The castle was not repaired and fell into ruins. Only the former gatehouse and some short sections of original medieval curtain wall still exist. The gatehouse is now used as a hotel.

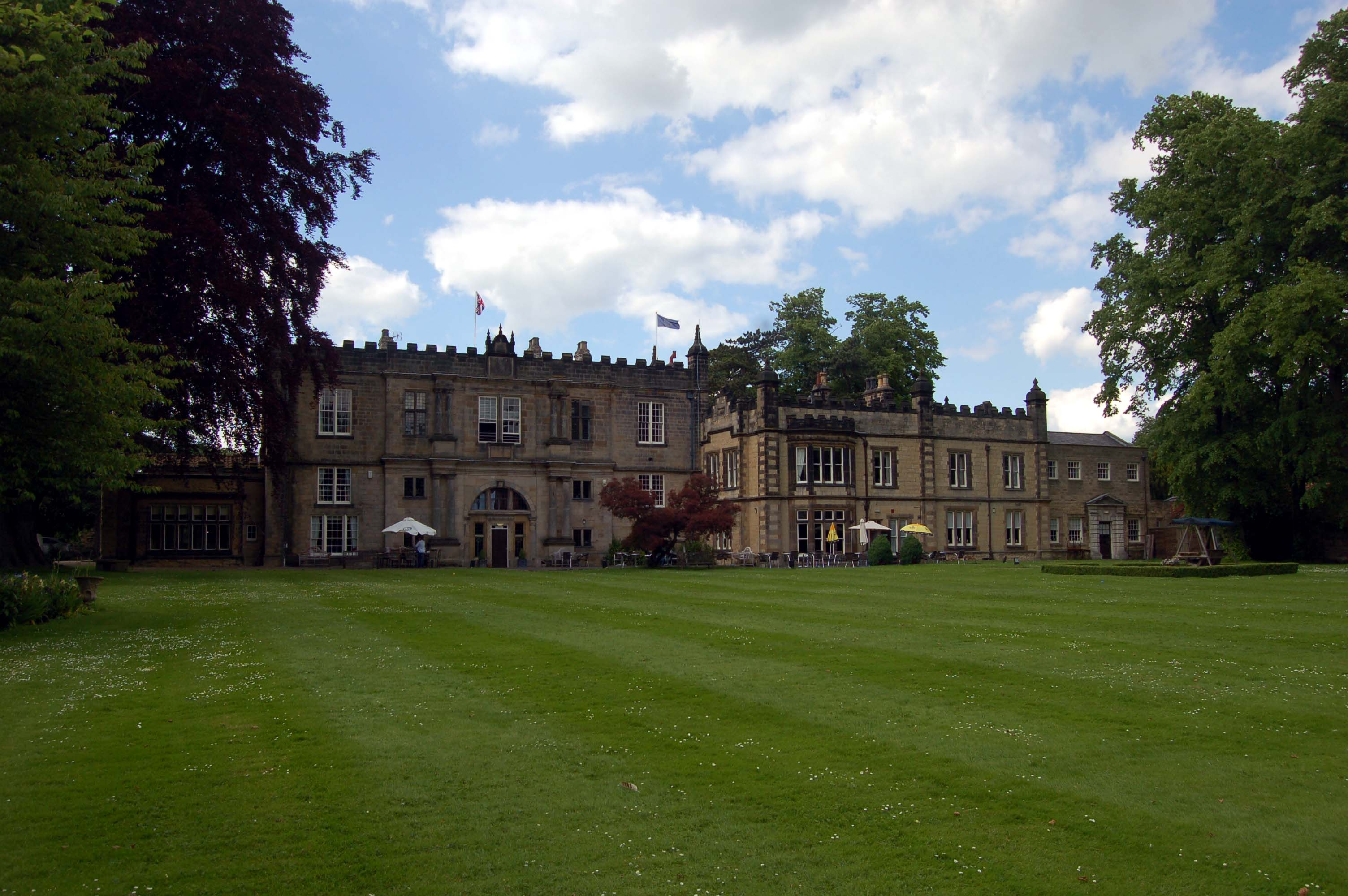
The Old Lodge, formerly the gatehouse to Malton Castle and now a hotel

A house was built on the site in 1569 by Ralph, Lord Eure, which came to be inherited by two sisters of the Eure family, Margaret and Mary. In 1674 they fell out over ownership and took their argument to the County Sheriff, who destroyed the house and put the stones into two equal piles for the sisters to share.

The site is now a scheduled monument.

== See also ==
- Castles in Great Britain and Ireland
- List of castles in England
