= Hildenley =

Former civil parish in England

Coordinates: 54.1278°N 0.8556°W

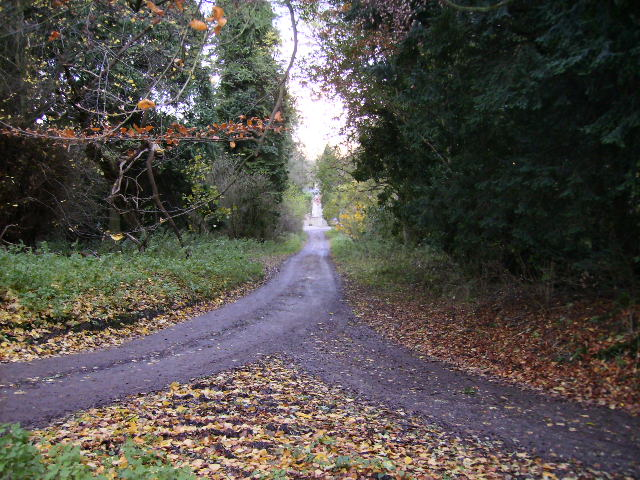
- Track junction to farm in Hindenley Wood

- Location within North Yorkshire
- Civil parish: Amotherby
- Unitary authority: North Yorkshire
- Ceremonial county: North Yorkshire
- Region: Yorkshire and the Humber
- Country: England
- Sovereign state: United Kingdom
- Police: North Yorkshire
- Fire: North Yorkshire
- Ambulance: Yorkshire

Hildenley is a former civil parish, now in the parish of Amotherby, 2 miles (3.2 km) south-west of Malton, North Yorkshire, England, on the north bank of the River Derwent. In 1971 the parish had a population of 27. Hildenley stone, considered to be the best decorative stone in Yorkshire, takes its name from the site. Until 1974 it was in the North Riding of Yorkshire. It was part of the Ryedale district between 1974 and 2023. It is now administered by North Yorkshire Council.

The area is referred to in Domesday Book as Hildingeslei and was also referred to as Hieldenley. There was a holy well at the site, which was named in honour of St. Hilda. Hildenley was formerly a township in the parish of Appleton-le-Street, in 1866 Hildenley became a separate civil parish. On 1 April 1986 the parish was abolished and merged with Amotherby.

In 1565, the estate and its quarries were purchased by the navigator William Strickland, grandfather of Sir William Strickland, 1st Baronet, and the Elizabethan house likely built in the 17th or 18th century. It was built from the fine-grained peloidal limestone found on the estate that became known as Hildenley limestone. It is of extremely high quality, particularly suited for interior carving, and was used at Kirkham Priory, Malton Priory and the chapel at Castle Howard.

George Strickland, of Hildenley, represented the county of Yorkshire in the British Parliament in the 19th century. The estate was 270 acres in the mid-19th century.

The eighth baronet was a keen botanist and built a large conservatory and other structures for nature. After his death on 31 December 1909, Hildenley Hall was described thus by the Linnean Society: "The Hall, although not a very large building, is a comfortable residence, built in a well sheltered site at the base of a steep wooded bank of limestone formation known as Hildenley Wood, which is a relic of the ancient forest-land of Yorkshire and has never been under cultivation, and is the home of some of the rarest of our British native orchids and other rare kinds of the wild flora of Britain."

Sir Walter Strickland, 9th Baronet, known as the "Anarchist Baronet" for his anti-imperialist ideas, sold the estate after his father's death in 1909. It was bought by the Hon. Francis Dawnay (11 December 1853 – 26 June 1914), son of William Dawnay, 7th Viscount Downe, and demolished soon afterwards, another house replacing it.
