= Old Malton =

Village in North Yorkshire, England

Coordinates: 54.145049°N 0.778016°W

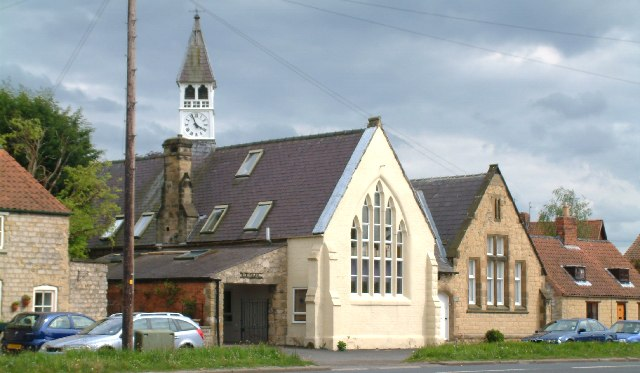
- Former grammar school, Old Malton

- Location within North Yorkshire
- OS grid reference: SE799728
  - London: 180 mi (290 km) S
- Civil parish: Malton
- Unitary authority: North Yorkshire
- Ceremonial county: North Yorkshire
- Region: Yorkshire and the Humber
- Country: England
- Sovereign state: United Kingdom
- Post town: MALTON
- Postcode district: YO17
- Police: North Yorkshire
- Fire: North Yorkshire
- Ambulance: Yorkshire
- UK Parliament: Thirsk and Malton

Old Malton is a village in the civil parish of Malton, in North Yorkshire, England. The village is situated just south of the A64 road and is 1-mile (1.5 km) north-east of the town of Malton. The village is on the B1257 which links Malton with the A64 and the A169 road to the north and is bounded on its eastern side by the River Derwent.

== History ==
Old Malton appears in the Domesday Book as Maltune (meaning Middleton), the present day settlement of Malton (or New Malton) came after Old Malton.

St Mary's Priory Church in the village was founded as a Gilbertine Priory in the 12th century. A church had previously existed in the village as recorded in the Domesday Book, but it is believed that this was damaged when Thurstan of Bayeaux (then Archbishop of York) burned the village to the ground in 1138 after the Battle of the Standard. Eustace Fitz-John, the local landowner, donated the damaged church to the Gilbertine order and they rebuilt the church as a priory. After the Dissolution, the church was reformed as the parish church of Old Malton which it remained as until 1896 when Old and New Malton were joined together as a civil parish. The church still exists today and is noted for being the only Gilbertine Priory church in use for regular worship in England. The building, though largely amended since the Dissolution and renovated by Temple Moore in the 19th century, is now grade I listed.

In May 1547, Archbishop Robert Holgate issued letters patent which declared that three grammar schools would be built in the region including one at Old Malton. The school was in existence until 1835, when the incumbent vicar at St Mary's church moved the pupils to his own school in nearby Norton. The grammar school buildings are still standing as two private dwellings and are now grade II listed.

Eden Camp Second World War Museum is in the village.

In 1891 the civil parish had a population of 1844. On 1 October 1896 the parish was abolished and merged with New Malton to form "Malton". Until 1974 it was in the North Riding of Yorkshire. From 1974 to 2023 it was part of the district of Ryedale, it is now administered by the unitary North Yorkshire Council.
