= Malton Town Hall =

Municipal building in Malton, North Yorkshire, England

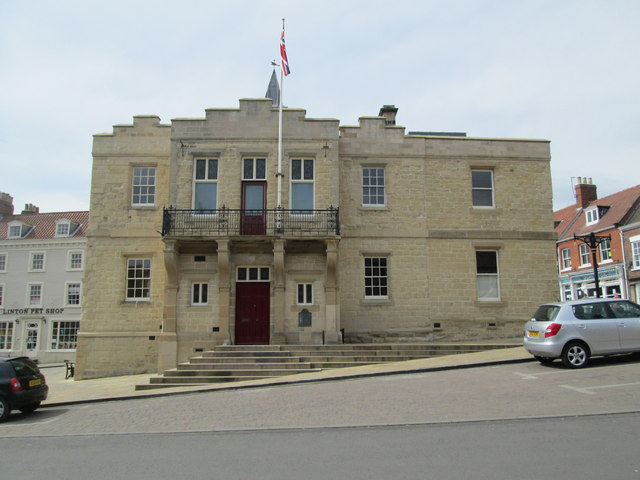
- The east-facing entrance block

- Shown in North Yorkshire
- 54.1358°N 0.7988°W
- Location: Market Place, Malton

History
- Built: 1749

Site notes
- Architectural style: Neoclassical style

Listed Building – Grade II
- Official name: Malton Museum
- Designated: 29 September 1951
- Reference no.: 1282440

Malton Town Hall is a municipal building in the Market Place, Malton, North Yorkshire, England. The structure, which is used as a restaurant, is a grade II listed building.

== History ==
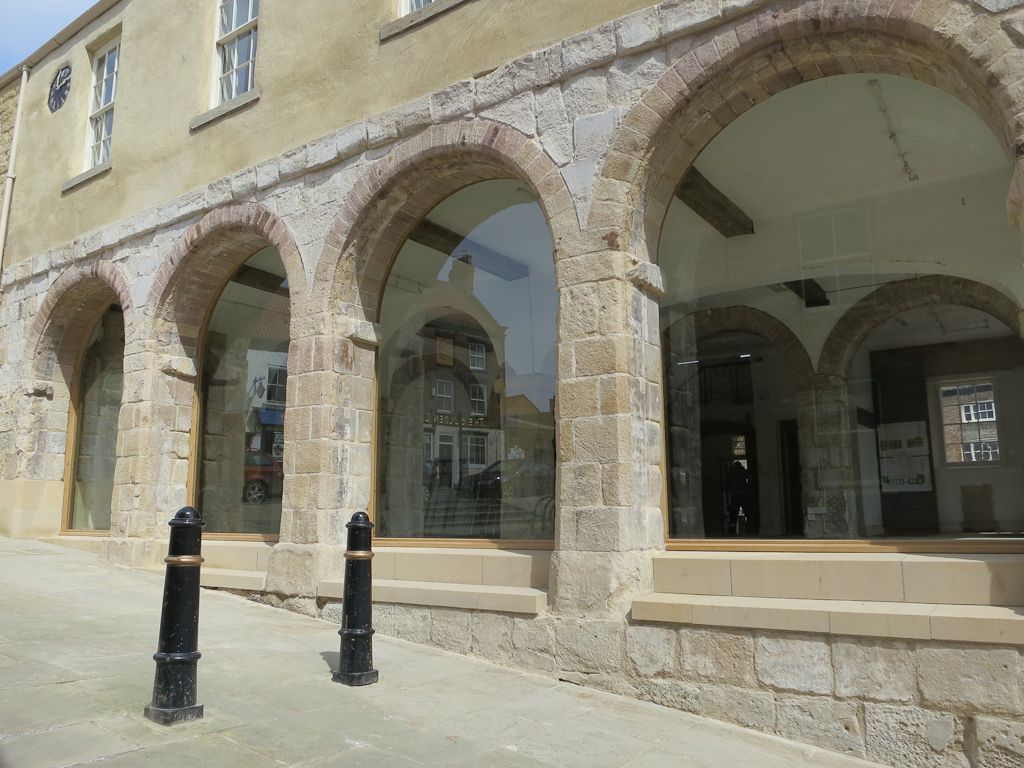
The west-facing butter market

The first building on the site was an early market cross dating back to the 16th century. The current building was commissioned by Thomas Watson-Wentworth, 1st Marquess of Rockingham, whose seat was at Wentworth Woodhouse, as a butter market for the town. It was designed in the neoclassical style, built in stone and completed in 1749. The design involved a rectangular structure which was arcaded on the ground floor, so that markets could be held, with a council chamber on the first floor.

The building was extensively refaced in an unsympathetic style in the mid-19th century, and then extended to the north and to the east in the late 19th century. The design of the new east-facing entrance block, which was castellated, involved a symmetrical main frontage of five bays. The central section of three bays, which was slightly projected forward, featured a doorway with a rectangular fanlight, flanked by two small bi-partite widows. The bays in the central section were flanked by pilasters and by large brackets supporting a wrought iron balcony. On the first floor there was a French door flanked by two casement windows. The outer bays were fenestrated by sash windows on both floors.

Petty session hearings were typically held in the building on a fortnightly basis and county court hearings were held once a month. Following significant population growth, largely associated with the status of Malton as a market town, the area became an urban district in 1894. The town hall then served as the meeting place of the new district council for much of the 20th century, but ceased to be the local seat of government when Ryedale District Council was formed at the council offices in Norton-on-Derwent in 1974. The Malton Museum relocated from the Milton Rooms to the town hall in 1982. However, when their lease came to an end in 2012, the trustees of the museum decided to move to Subscription Rooms.

The town hall then remained vacant for five years, after which it was extensively refurbished to a design by Folium Architects. The work, which cost £380,000, involved the removal of the in-filling in the arches and the installation of glazing instead. The building then re-opened as a restaurant, known as the Stew and Oyster, in 2019. It came under new management, as The Pizza on The Square, in 2023.

== See also ==
- Listed buildings in Malton, North Yorkshire (central area)
