= The Gate, Malton =

Former pub in Malton, North Yorkshire, England

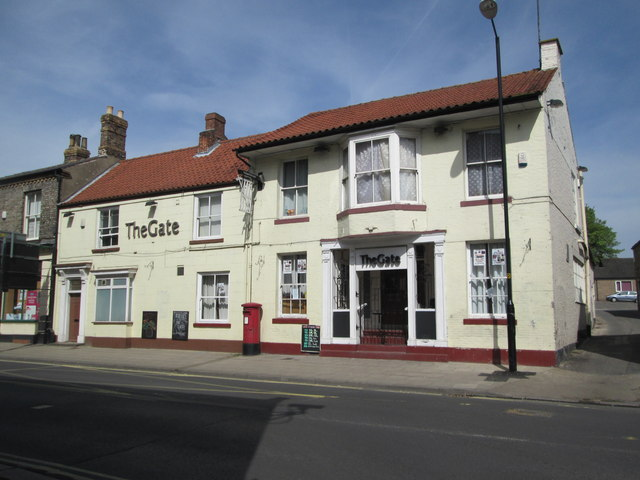
The pub, in 2014

The Gate is a historic closed pub in Malton, North Yorkshire, a town in England.

The building lies on Yorkersgate and was originally two houses. The house to the left was built in the 18th century, while the right-hand house was built in the early 19th century. It was occupied by a wine merchant in the 1840s, and by the 1890s it had been converted into a pub named The Board. It was later renamed The Gate, and expanded into the left-hand house. It closed in 2020, at which time it was owned by Punch Taverns. Punch Taverns refurbished it and renamed it the Filly and Flagon. It reopened in November 2025 It has been grade II listed since 1974.

Both parts of the pub have two storeys. The early part on the left is in painted render, with a pantile roof, and two bays. On the left is a doorway with pilasters, a fanlight, and a cornice on brackets, to its right is a shallow square bay window, and the other windows are sashes. The later part is in painted brick on a plinth, with projecting eaves and a slate roof. There are three bays, and a central doorway with pilasters and a cornice. Above it is a canted oriel window, and the other windows are sashes.

== See also ==
- Listed buildings in Malton, North Yorkshire (central area)
