= Malton Quaker Meeting House =

Building in Malton, North Yorkshire, England

Coordinates: 54°08′13″N 0°47′48″W

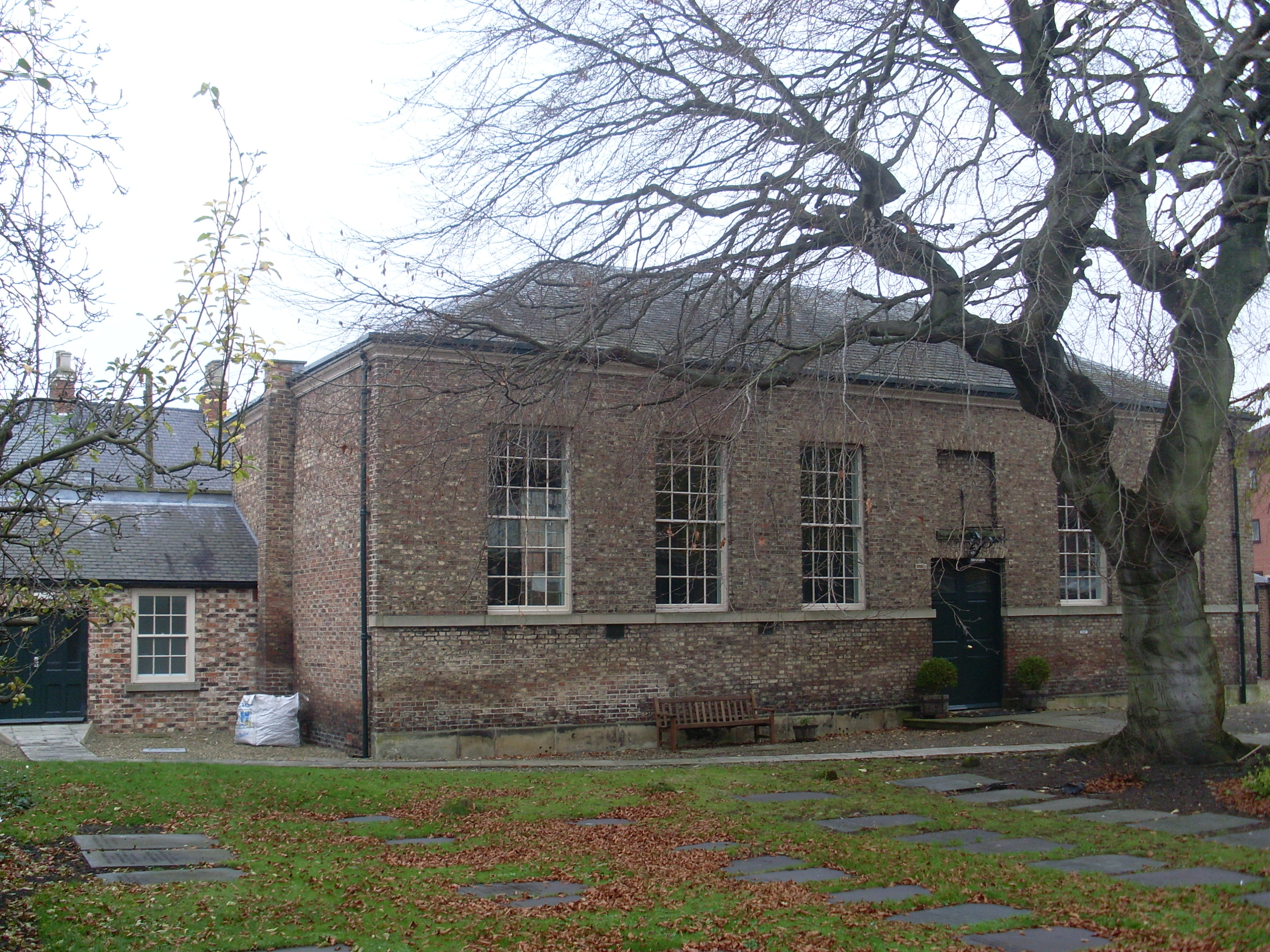
The building, in 2012

Malton Quaker Meeting House is a historic building in Malton, North Yorkshire, a town in England.

The first Quaker meeting in Malton took place in 1671, and in 1677 a small thatched meeting house was constructed on Spital Hill. During the 18th century, a burial ground was created on Greengate, and between 1820 and 1823 a new meeting house was constructed on part of the burial ground. The building was grade II* listed in 1951. In the 1980s, there was a proposal to demolish the building, but it was instead restored from 1991 to 1993, using a grant from English Heritage.

The building is constructed of pink and cream mottled brick on a sandstone plinth, with sandstone dressings, a sill band, a moulded eaves cornice, and a hipped slate roof. There is one tall storey and six bays. On the front is a doorway, above which is a blocked square opening. The windows are sashes, and all the openings have flat arches of gauged brick. Inside, there are two meeting rooms, with a through passage between them. There is a painted timber dado in both rooms, and in the larger rooms there is a timber elder's stand at the west end. The walls enclosing the burial ground are in brick with flat stone coping, some sections dating from the 18th century.

The neighbouring caretaker's house also dates from 1823, and is grade II listed. The house is built of pink and cream mottled brick, with an eaves band and slate roof. There are two storeys, one bay facing the road, and two bays on the left return. The windows are sashes with cambered arches. In the left return is a doorway with a cambered head, and an upper floor extension on posts.

== See also ==
- Grade II* listed churches in North Yorkshire (district)
- Listed buildings in Malton, North Yorkshire (central area)
