= The Green Man, Malton =

Former pub in Malton, North Yorkshire, England

Coordinates: 54°08′05″N 0°48′00″W

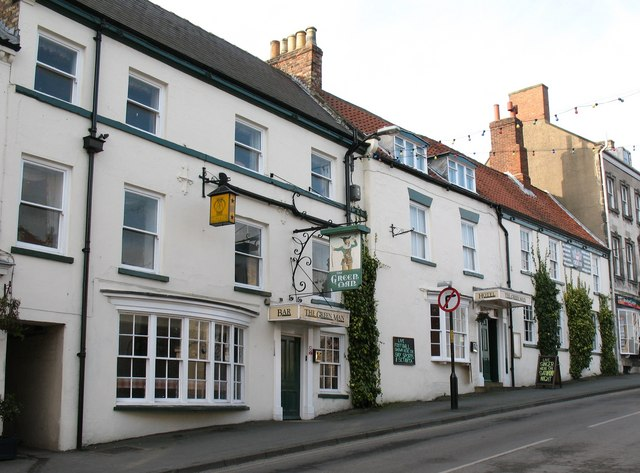
The pub, in 2009

The Green Man is a historic former pub in Malton, North Yorkshire, a town in England.

The pub originated as three buildings on Market Street, in the town centre. The oldest is the northernmost, a timber-framed building which was probably constructed in the 15th century, and was refronted in 1740. By 1823, it had been converted into an inn, named The Fleece. The southernmost building housed the Green Man inn from at least 1823, but it was reconstructed in the late 19th century. In the late 19th century, it was run by Tom Tate Smith, who founded the drinks wholesaler Tate Smith, which is still based in the town. The middle building is early 19th century, and was amalgamated into one of the pubs in the mid 20th century. During the 20th century, all three buildings were extended to the rear. In 1977, the three buildings were combined to form a larger Green Man pub. The work included a new, central, entrance. The building was grade II listed in 1974. The pub closed in 2011.

The building is rendered at the front, the northern house has a Welsh slate roof, and the others have pantile roofs. The northern house has two storeys and four bays, the middle house has two storeys and an attic, and two bays, and the southern house has three storeys and four bays. In the extreme north bay is a passage entry, and there are two doorways with canopies. On the ground floor is a bow window and a canted bay window, most of the other windows are sashes, and the middle house has two dormers. Inside the southern house is an inglenook fireplace.

== See also ==
- Listed buildings in Malton, North Yorkshire (central area)
