= Malton Museum =

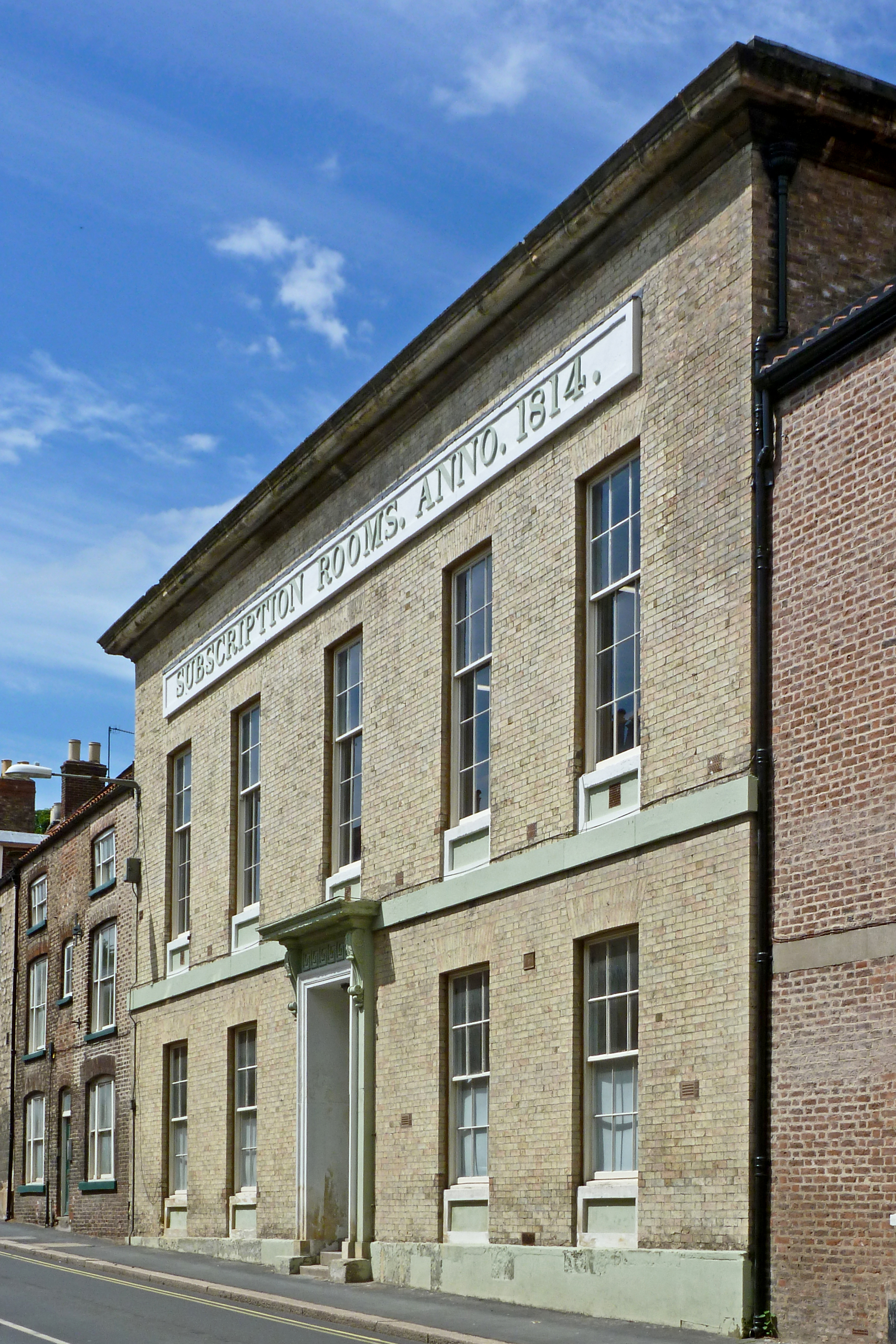

- Location within North Yorkshire
- Established: 1935; 91 years ago
- Location: The Subscription Rooms, Yorkersgate, Malton, North Yorkshire, England
- Coordinates: 54.139°N 0.792°W
- Type: Archaeological Museum
- Director: Peter Addyman (Chair of trustees)
- Website: www.maltonmuseum.co.uk

Malton Museum is an archaeological museum based in Malton, North Yorkshire.

== History ==
The museum first opened in 1935 in the Milton Rooms. By 1982 the collection had expanded and the museum relocated to Malton Town Hall, where it was run by volunteers. This building was leased at a nominal rate from the local council; the expiration of this lease in April 2012 forced the closure of the museum at this site due to the prohibitive cost of the commercial leasing rates that it faced.

In 2013 the museum reopened in two rooms in The Subscription Rooms.

In 2015 the museum employed its first paid member of staff in over 85 years thanks to a successful grant of £87,775 from Arts Council England for the 'Vivat Fido!' project.

The museum held its first Roman festival in 2022 which was repeated in 2023, These were held on the site of the Roman Fort in Orchard Field and this year's event will take place on 21 July 2024.

== Collections ==
The core collection is formed from the results of the first excavations at the Roman fort at Malton (Derventio) between 1927 and 1930 by Philip Corder and John Kirk.

The current museum collections consists of approximately 1,110 boxes of objects, of which 96% is archaeological in nature. Approximately 4% of the collection is viewable on display at any one time.
