= Spotted Cow, Malton =

Pub in Malton, North Yorkshire, England

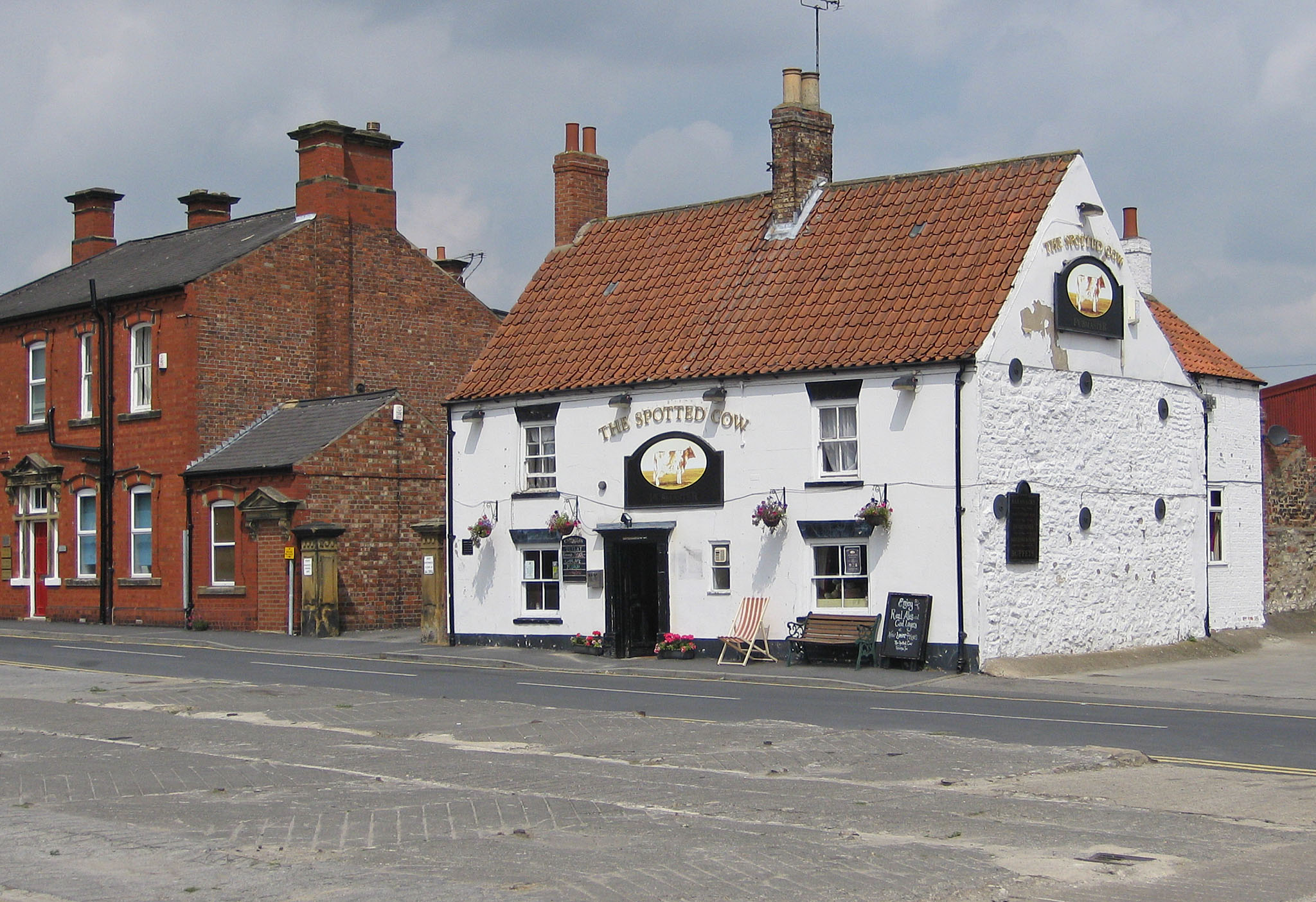
The building, in 2011

The Spotted Cow is a historic pub in Malton, North Yorkshire, a town in England.

The age of the building is uncertain; Historic England describes it as being 18th century "or possibly earlier", while the Gazette and Herald describes it as being 16th century. It was first recorded as a beer house in 1807, and was licensed as a public house in 1869. It was extended during the 19th century, and much of its interior survives from this period. The building was grade II listed in 1974. It was purchased by a brewery in 1988, later passing to Punch Taverns. It closed in 2018 for refurbishment, the work including the conversion of the pool room into a lounge. It is a Tetley Heritage Pub.

The pub is built of colourwashed render, with a rear extension in brick, an eaves cornice, and a pantile roof. There are two storeys, two bays, and a rear wing. The doorway has panelled pilasters and a cornice, and the windows are sashes with wedge lintels. Two of the windows have glass reading "TAP ROOM" and "SMOKE ROOM", and there is a carved timber pub sign, showing a spotted cow.

== See also ==
- Listed buildings in Malton, North Yorkshire (central area)
