= Palace Cinema, Malton =

Commercial building in Malton, North Yorkshire, England

The Palace Cinema
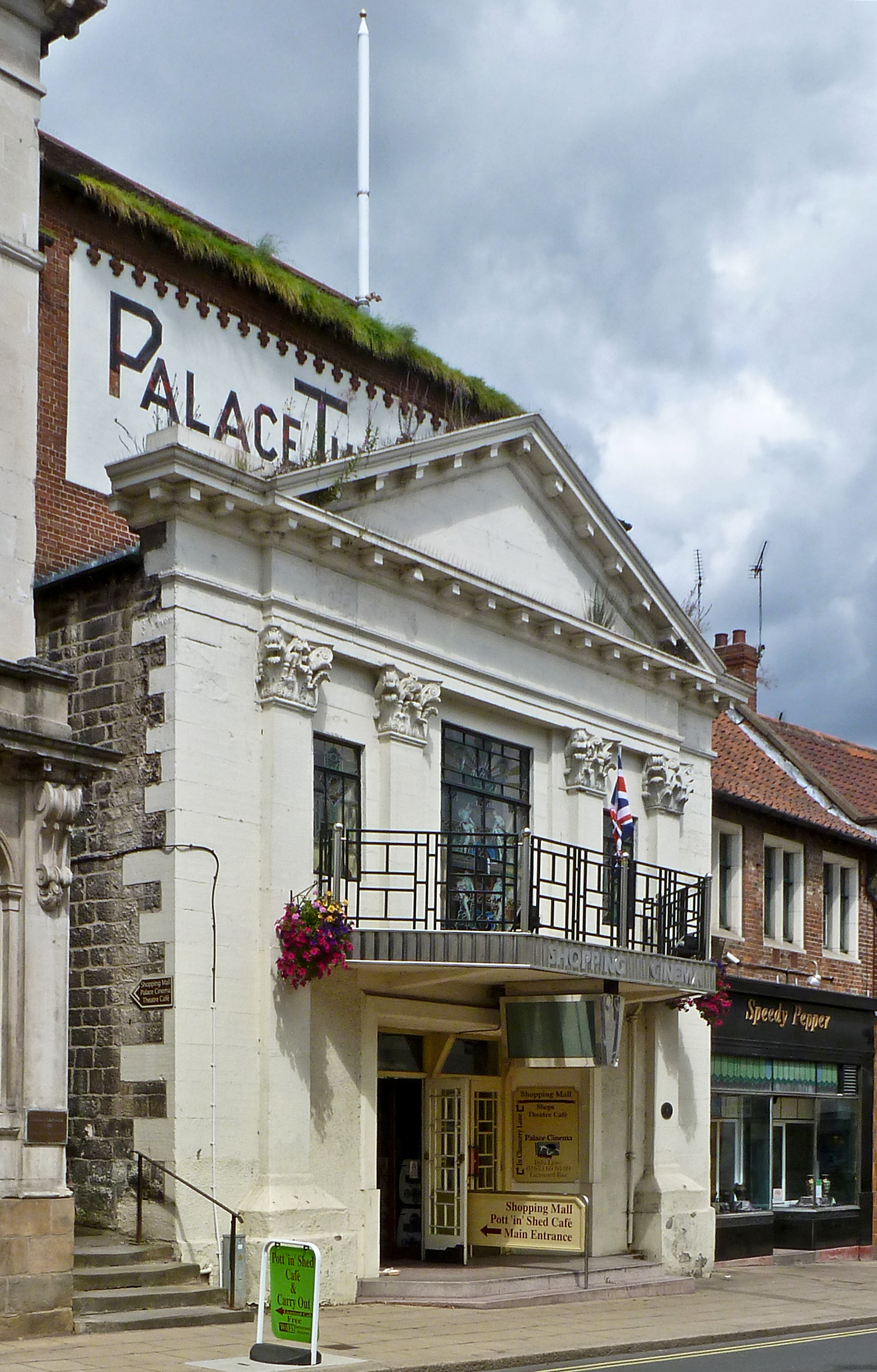
- The Palace Cinema

- Shown in North Yorkshire
- 54.1347°N 0.7983°W
- Location: Yorkersgate, Malton

History
- Built: 1846

Site notes
- Architectural style: Neoclassical style

Listed Building – Grade II
- Official name: Former Palace Cinema and Cinema Shop
- Designated: 10 June 1974
- Reference no.: 1220592

The Palace Cinema is a commercial building in Yorkersgate in Malton, North Yorkshire, England. The structure, which was originally commissioned as a corn exchange, is a Grade II listed building.

== History ==
The building was commissioned as a corn exchange by the lord of the manor, Charles Wentworth-Fitzwilliam, 5th Earl Fitzwilliam, whose seat was at Wentworth Woodhouse. The site he selected was on the north side of Yorkersgate.

The building was designed in the neoclassical style, built in ashlar stone and was officially opened in 1846. The attendees at the opening included Viscount Morpeth, whose seat was at Castle Howard and his agent, John Henderson. The original design involved a symmetrical main frontage of five bays facing onto Yorkersgate. The central section of three bays featured a tetrastyle portico formed by four full-height Corinthian order pilasters supporting an entablature and a modillioned pediment. There were three casement windows on the first floor, but the outer bays were blind. Internally, the principal room was the main trading hall.

Notwithstanding the completion of the new building, corn traders preferred to conduct their business, as they had done previously, in the open air. Moreover, the use of the building as a corn exchange declined significantly in the wake of the Great Depression of British Agriculture in the late 19th century. However, it continued to be used for public events: speakers included the local member of parliament, John Grant Lawson, in January 1899.

The building was converted for use by cinema audiences in 1914 and re-opened as the Exchange Cinema on 13 February 1915. A more substantial programme of works, involving the creation of a new front entrance with a canopy and a balcony above, and the installation of a proscenium arch and stage, was completed in 1934. The windows were decorated in Art Deco style with stained glass depicting some figures dancing, and a shopping mall was established on the ground floor. After completion of the works, which were carried out by W. Birch and Son of York, to a design by James Brodie of Pudsey, the building re-opened as the Palace Theatre on 7 May 1934.

The building closed in 1998, but reopened again, under new management, in July 2002. The cinema was split into two screens in 2006 and then into three screens (with just 12 seats in the third screen) in 2013. The owners invested in full fibre broadband to ensure films could be received on a timely basis in July 2023.

== See also ==
- Corn exchanges in England
- Listed buildings in Malton, North Yorkshire (central area)
