= Listed buildings in Malton, North Yorkshire (central area) =

Malton is a civil parish in the county of North Yorkshire, England. It contains about 240 listed buildings that are recorded in the National Heritage List for England. Of these, two are listed at Grade I, the highest of the three grades, 14 are at Grade II*, the middle grade, and the others are at Grade II, the lowest grade. The parish contains the market town of Malton, the village of Old Malton and the surrounding area. The earlier settlement is Old Malton, which is associated with Malton Priory. New Malton, to the southwest, grew around the area of the castle, now demolished, and was centred around a market, with a port to the south on the River Derwent.

This list contains the listed buildings in Market Place and the streets immediately surrounding it. The area is mainly commercial and residential, most of the listed buildings being shops, offices, and houses. The other listed buildings include churches and chapels, public houses and cottages, banks, a workshop, meeting rooms, a cinema, a post office and telephone kiosks.

The listed buildings in the outer areas are included in Listed buildings in Malton, North Yorkshire (outer areas).

== Key ==
Grade	Criteria
I	Buildings of exceptional interest, sometimes considered to be internationally important
II*	Particularly important buildings of more than special interest
II	Buildings of national importance and special interest

== Buildings ==
Name and location	Photograph	Date	Notes	Grade
St Michael's Church; 54.13531°N 0.79907°W		Mid-12th century	The church has been extended and much altered through the centuries. It is built in sandstone with a slate roof, and consists of a nave with a clerestory, north and south aisles, north and south transepts, a chancel with a north vestry and organ chamber and a south chapel, and a west tower. The tower has three stages, angle buttresses, a chamfered plinth, and moulded string courses. On the west side is a doorway with a moulded surround, a four-centred arch and a hood mould, and above it is a Perpendicular window. The bell openings have pointed cusped openings and hood moulds, and above is a plain parapet.	II*
The Green Man; 54.13493°N 0.79997°W		Late medieval	A row of three houses combined into a hotel, the left two houses dating from the 19th century. The building is rendered at the front, the left house has a Welsh slate roof, and the others have pantile roofs. The right house has two storeys and four bays, the middle house has two storeys and an attic, and two bays, and the left house has three storeys and four bays. In the extreme left bay is a passage entry, and there are two doorways with canopies. On the ground floor is a bow window and a canted bay window, most of the other windows are sashes, and the middle house has two dormers. Inside the right house is an inglenook fireplace.	II
28 Market Place; 54.13529°N 0.79841°W	—	Late 17th century	A house, later a shop, in orange-red brick on the front, in stone at the back and brick rear wings, with a moulded eaves cornice and a pantile roof. There are two storeys and four bays, and rear wings. On the ground floor is a shopfront with panelled pilasters and a cornice, and to the right is a doorway with a fanlight. The upper floor contains two sash windows on the left and two cross windows on the right, all with moulded sills and flat arches.	II
44 Market Place; 54.13578°N 0.79819°W	—	Late 17th century	A house, later a shop, in painted brick at the front, timber framed with orange-red brick infill at the rear, with a moulded eaves course, overhanging eaves on shaped brackets, and a pantile roof with coped gables and shaped kneelers. There are two storeys and three bays. On the ground floor is a double shopfront with a continuous fascia and moulded cornice, and to the left is a passage doorway with pilasters. The upper floor contains sash windows.	II
1, 3 and 5 Castlegate; 54.13466°N 0.79605°W	—	Early 18th century	Three houses, later used for other purposes, in pink and cream mottled brick with stone dressings, the rear in stone and orange-red brick, and pantile roofs. No. 1 on the left has three storeys and two bays. In the right bay is a shopfront with pilasters, moulded imposts and a moulded cornice. To its left is a doorway with a quoined surround, a cambered arch of stepped voussoirs, and a vermiculated keystone, and further to the left is a sash window. The other parts have a lower roof, three storeys and five bays. In the outer bays are tripartite windows with segmental arches and triple vermiculated keystones. In the middle bay is a plate glass window, and this is flanked by segmental-headed doorways with fanlights. The windows on the upper floors of all parts are sashes.	II
68 and 70 Castlegate; 54.13381°N 0.79363°W		Early 18th century (probable)	A house, later a house and a shop, in painted stone with a pantile roof. There are two storeys and two bays. In the left bay is a shopfront with pilasters, moulded imposts and cornice, a recessed doorway with a fanlight to the left, and above is a sash window. The right bay contains a doorway and a sash window to the left, and on the upper floor is a three-light horizontally-sliding sash window.	II
2, 4 and 6 Newbiggin; 54.13667°N 0.79807°W	—	Early 18th century	Two houses, later three shops, in stone, with a moulded eaves course, and a pantile roof with stone coping and a shaped kneeler on the right. There are two storeys and attics, and four bays. On the ground floor are three shopfronts with pilasters and imposts, and cornices. The right bay of the upper floor contains a canted bay window, and the other windows are sash windows, one with a wedge lintel, and the others with flat arches of voussoirs. On the left are two gabled dormers with bargeboards.	II
59 and 61 Market Place; 54.13554°N 0.79874°W		Early 18th century	A shop in painted brick on the front, in red brick at the rear and in the right return, on a stone plinth, with chamfered quoins, a moulded eaves cornice on consoles, and a double span pantile roof with coped gables and shaped kneelers. There are three storeys, an attic and a basement, a front of three bays, and two bays in the return. In the centre, steps lead up to a doorway with a patterned fanlight and a cornice hood, flanked by tripartite windows. The upper floors contain sash windows, and in the attic are two gabled dormers.	II
40 Wheelgate; 54.13612°N 0.79722°W	—	Early 18th century or earlier	A house, later a shop, in stone at the front and in orange-red brick at the rear, with a pantile roof and coped gables. There are two storeys and an attic, and two bays. On the ground floor is a shopfront with a canted bay window with a half-hipped roof. To its left is a doorway with a fanlight, and further to the left is a passage entry with an elliptical arch of voussoirs. The upper floor contains sash windows, and above is a flat-roofed dormer.	II
62 Wheelgate; 54.13659°N 0.79776°W	—	Early 18th century	The shop is in painted render at the front and stone at the rear, with quoins, and a pantile roof. There are two storeys and one bay. On the ground floor is a 20th-century shopfront, and above is a casement window. At the rear and in the left return are various openings, some with wedge lintels, and one with a keystone.	II
43 Yorkersgate; 54.13416°N 0.80010°W		Early 18th century	Originally part of a hotel, later used for other purposes, it is in stone on a rendered plinth, and has a coped left gable and a moulded kneeler. There are two storeys, two bays, and a pilaster strip on the right. In the centre is a doorway, the windows are sashes, and all the openings have flat arches of voussoirs with keystones.	II
Malton Museum; 54.13579°N 0.79874°W		Early 18th century	Originally a butter market and town hall, it is in sandstone on a chamfered plinth, with a slate roof. The entrance front has a floor band, a moulded eaves band, and a coped parapet, stepped in places. There are two storeys and six bays. Three bays project, with pilasters and moulded imposts, and a balcony with wrought iron railings on massive grooved consoles. A flight of steps leads up to a doorway with a divided fanlight. Above are a doorway and windows, and the other bays contain sash windows. At the rear are four bays and a one-bay extension, containing an arcade of arches infilled with sash windows. On the roof is a bellcote with a pyramidal roof and a weathervane.	II
The Clarence Public House; 54.13652°N 0.79769°W		Early 18th century (or earlier)	The public house has a painted pebbledashed front, and a pantile roof, hipped on the right. There are two storeys and five bays. The doorway has a dentilled cornice and a pediment, and at the left end is a round-arched passage entry. The windows are sashes, those on the upper floor top-hung.	II
82 and 82A Castlegate; 54.13363°N 0.79274°W		Mid-18th century	The house is in painted brick on a stone plinth, with stone dressings, chamfered quoins, sill bands, a moulded cornice on consoles, and a pantile roof with stone coped gables and shaped kneelers. There are two storeys and an attic, and six bays. The doorway in the third bay has a fanlight, and in the right bay is another doorway. In the fourth bay on the upper floor is a canted bay window, and the other windows are sashes. The doorway and windows have keystones, and in the attics are two gabled dormers.	II
9 and 11 Finkle Street; 54.13627°N 0.79824°W	—	Mid-18th century	Two houses, later shops, in stone on the front, rendered on the left side, and with pink and cream mottled brick at the rear, a stepped eaves band and a pantile roof. There are two storeys and three bays. On the ground floor are two shopfronts and a doorway with a keystone, and the upper floor contains horizontally-sliding sash windows.	II
23 Market Place; 54.13581°N 0.79918°W	—	Mid-18th century	A house, later two shops, in painted brick on a plinth, with an eaves band and modillion cornice, and a pantile roof with a coped left gable and shaped kneeler. There are two storeys and an attic, and four bays. In the centre is a doorway with a fanlight, a bracketed flat hood and a wedge lintel. To the left is a double shopfront containing bow windows with fluted sills, a fascia and a moulded cornice. To the right is a single shopfront with pilasters and imposts, a fascia and a moulded cornice. The upper floor contains sash windows with wedge lintels, and in the attic are two flat dormers.	II
29 Market Place and railings 54.13604°N 0.79886°W	—	Mid-18th century	A public house, later offices, in red brick, rendered on the right, on a stone plinth, with quoins, a sill band, a moulded eaves cornice, and a pantile roof with a coped right gable. There are two storeys and an attic, and five bays. The central doorway has pilasters and a cornice hood on elaborate consoles. The windows are sashes with flat arches of gauged brick with keystones, and in the attic are three flat dormers with casements. In front of the building are iron railings on a stone plinth about 0.75 metres (2 ft 6 in) tall.	II
36 and 38 Market Place and 10 St Michael Street; 54.13554°N 0.79804°W	—	18th century	A row of houses, later three shops, of different builds. No. 38 Market Place is in painted brick with a pantile roof. There are three storeys and two bays. On the ground floor is a double shopfront, the middle floor contains a tripartite window and a sash window, and on the top floor are casement windows. No. 36, on the right, is in painted render with a pantile roof. It has two storeys and an attic, and two bays. It contains a shopfront and shop window on the ground floor, two sash windows on the upper floor, and a gabled dormer in the attic. No. 10 St Michael Street, further to the right and on a corner, is in painted render, and has a slate roof. There are two storeys, three bays on Market Place, and three on St Michael Street, and a canted bay on the corner containing a doorway. On the ground floor are shop windows and above are sash windows.	II
46 Market Place; 54.13586°N 0.79826°W	—	Mid-18th century	Two houses, later one shop, in painted brick at the front and stone at the rear, with a pantile roof. There are two storeys and an attic, and three bays. On the ground floor are two shopfronts with pilasters, and to the left is a passage door. The upper floor contains sash windows, in the attic are two flat dormers, and at the rear is a raking dormer.	II
1 St Michael Street; 54.13559°N 0.79717°W		18th century	A shop on a corner site, it is rendered, and has a corbel eaves course on the front, and pantile roofs with a coped gable and a shaped kneeler on the right. The front on Wheelgate has two storeys and two bays, a double shopfront with grooved pilasters and enriched imposts, and a fascia and a moulded cornice on grooved consoles. Above are two-light casement windows with incised wedge lintels. The front on St Michael's Street has a gabled bay with two storeys and an attic, and a range of two storeys and three bays. The shopfront continues along the ground floor, and the upper floor contains sash windows.	II
1 and 3 Wheelgate; 54.13488°N 0.79657°W	—	18th century	Two houses, later offices, on a corner site, in reddish-brown brick on a chamfered stone plinth, with rusticated pilasters on the ground floor, the upper floors rendered, with chamfered quoins, and a slate roof with coped gables and shaped kneelers. There are two storeys, four bays on Wheelgate and two on Yorkersgate. Above the ground floor is a modillion cornice. On the ground floor on Wheelgate is an entablature and two doorways, and all the windows are sashes in architraves with cambered heads.	II
49 and 51 Wheelgate and 1 Finkle Street; 54.13642°N 0.79799°W		Mid-18th century	1 Finkle Street is in painted stone with a pantile roof, two storeys and two bays. On the ground floor is a doorway with a quoined surround flanked by bow windows, with another door to the right, and on the upper floor are sash windows. 49 and 51 Wheelgate, on a corner, date from the 19th century, and are in painted rendered stone and brick, with sill bands, and a hipped roof in pantile and slate. They are in three and two storeys, with three bays on Finkle Street, and three on Wheelgate. On the ground floor is a shopfront with pilasters, imposts, a fascia, and a modillion cornice on fluted corbels. There is a doorway in the canted corner, and another in Finkle Street with a fanlight. The windows on the upper floors are sashes.	II
Chapter Two Bar and 7 Market Place; 54.13525°N 0.79981°W		Mid-18th century	A public house and a shop to the right, with pantile roofs, two storeys and attics, and four bays. In the third bay is an elliptical carriage arch of rusticated voussoirs, and to the left is the public house. This has two bays with gables and bargeboards, a doorway with a cornice hood, and to its left is a canted bay window. The other windows are sashes, and in the attics are oriel windows. The shop is in red brick with an eaves cornice. On the ground floor is a shopfront with panelled pilasters, a moulded cornice, a canted bay window, and a doorway to the left. Above is a sash window with a wedge lintel, and in the attic is a flat dormer.	II
Former Midland Bank; 54.13595°N 0.79898°W	—	Mid-18th century	The bank is in orange-red brick on a stone plinth, with a sill band, a moulded and dentilled eaves cornice with consoles, and a tile roof. There are two storeys and attics, and six bays. In the outer bays are doorways with pilasters and cornices, the left one with an inserted window, and the other windows are sashes with wedge lintels. In the attics are two flat dormers with casements.	II
Milton House and former Whip Inn; 54.13486°N 0.79950°W	—	Mid-18th century (probable)	A house and a public house in rendered brick, with a moulded and cogged eaves cornice, and a pantile roof with coped gables, kneelers, and ball and pedestal finials. There are two storeys and attics, and four bays. In the left bay is a doorway with a fanlight and a pediment, and the right bay contains a former shopfront with pilasters and a moulded cornice, a doorway and two windows to the left with segmental heads. Above is a cross window in a gabled half-dormer. The other windows are also cross windows, those on the ground floor with cambered heads and cornice hoods, and in the attic are two gabled dormers.	II
The Gate Public House; 54.13466°N 0.79738°W		18th century	Two houses, the right added in the early 19th century, later combined into a public house, both parts with two storeys. The early part on the left is in painted render, with a pantile roof, and two bays. On the left is a doorway with pilasters, a fanlight, and a cornice on brackets, to its right is a shallow square bay window, and the other windows are sashes. The later part is in painted brick on a plinth, with projecting eaves and a slate roof. There are three bays, and a central doorway with pilasters and a cornice. Above it is a canted oriel window, and the other windows are sashes.	II
The Royal Oak Public House; 54.13524°N 0.79853°W		Mid-18th century	A house, later a public house, in painted stone on a shallow plinth, with a sill band, a moulded eaves cornice and a pantile roof. There are two storeys and an attic, and three bays. The central doorway is recessed in a splayed opening, and the windows are cross windows with flat arches of voussoirs. In the attic are two gabled dormers with horizontally-sliding sashes.	II
The Spotted Cow Public House; 54.13611°N 0.80038°W		Mid-18th century	The public house is in colourwashed render, with a rear extension in brick, an eaves cornice, and a pantile roof. There are two storeys, two bays, and a rear wing. The doorway has panelled pilasters and a cornice, and the windows are sashes with wedge lintels.	II
13 Finkle Street; 54.13620°N 0.79835°W	—	Mid to late 18th century	A house, later used for other purposes, in stone, with a pantile roof, and a coped gable and a shaped kneeler on the left. There are two storeys and three bays. On the ground floor is a shopfront with detached Ionic columns and an entablature, a recessed doorway with a fanlight, and two canted shop windows to the right. The upper floor contains sash windows.	II
12, 12A and 14 Market Place; 54.13500°N 0.79898°W		Mid to late 18th century	A shop in rendered and painted brick at the front, and orange-red brick on the right side, with a moulded modillion cornice, and a pantile roof. There are two storeys and four bays, and a single-storey single-bay extension on the right. On the ground floor is a 20th-century pilastered shopfront, and in the extension at the right is a doorway with a cornice hood. The upper floor contains sash windows.	II
17 Market Place; 54.13560°N 0.79948°W		Mid to late 18th century	A public house, later a shop, in red brick on a rendered plinth, with painted stone quoins, a moulded and dentilled eaves cornice, and a pantile roof with coped gables and shaped kneelers. There are three storeys and an attic, and four bays. On the ground floor is a shopfront with a central doorway under a pediment between windows with three arched lights. The upper floors contain sash windows with wedge lintels, those on the middle floor also with keystones, and in the attic are two gabled dormers.	II
3, 5 and 5A Market Street; 54.13448°N 0.79995°W	—	Mid to late 18th century	Two houses, later three shops, in stone, with a moulded eaves cornice and a pantile roof. There are two storeys and attics and four bays. In the centre is a passage doorway with pilasters and a cornice hood on corbels. To the left is a shopfront with Composite columns, an entablature and a cornice, the shop window with an arcade of five round-arched lights, and a doorway to the right. Further to the right are two shopfronts with pilasters and doorways under a continuous fascia and cornice. The upper floor contains a canted bay window on the left, and sash windows with triple keystones, and in the attic are four gabled dormers.	II
15 and 17 Castlegate; 54.13421°N 0.79494°W	—	Late 18th century	A pair of cottages in stone on a rendered plinth, with some pink and cream mottled brick, rendered on the left side, with a stepped eaves course, and a pantile roof. There are two storeys and two bays. In the centre are doorways, flanked by sash windows, in the left bay both under wedge lintels, and in the right bay with a continuous lintel. The upper floor contains horizontally-sliding sashes with wedge lintels and keystones.	II
19 and 21 Castlegate; 54.13419°N 0.79472°W	—	Late 18th century	A pair of cottages in orange-red brick on a stone plinth, with a pantile roof, stone copings, and moulded kneelers. There are two storeys and cellars, and three bays. The doorways are in the centre, they are approached by steps and have fanlights, above them is a blind window and the other windows on the front are sashes; all these openings have wedge lintels. In the cellars and at the rear are horizontally-sliding sash windows.	II
25 and 27 Castlegate; 54.13413°N 0.79441°W	—	Late 18th century	A house and a shop in orange and vitreous brick, with a pantile roof, and two storeys. No. 25 has two bays, and on the ground floor is a shopfront with pilasters, a cornice, and double doors with a fanlight. The upper floor contains sash windows with flat gauged brick arches and keystones. No. 27 has three bays, in the left two bays is a former shopfront with pilasters, shaped imposts and a moulded cornice, and to the right is a doorway with a fanlight approached by steps. In the middle bay of the upper floor is a blind window, the other windows are sashes, and all have keystones.	II
37 Castlegate; 54.13378°N 0.79193°W		Late 18th century	An inn, later a house, in stone on a plinth, with a pantile roof, stone coping and moulded kneelers. There are two storeys and an attic, and four bays. In the second bay is a doorway with pilasters and a fanlight, flanked by narrow windows. There are canted bay windows in the outer bays and on the upper floor above the doorway. The other windows are sashes with wedge lintels, and in the attic are four gabled dormers.	II
45 Castlegate; 54.13377°N 0.79146°W		Late 18th century	A house in stone, rendered above the upper floor windows, on a painted rendered plinth, with a pantile roof. There are two storeys and an attic, and two bays. On the front is a doorway with a fanlight, and the windows are sashes, the ground floor openings with painted wedge lintels. In the attic are two raking dormers.	II
47 Castlegate; 54.13377°N 0.79134°W	—	Late 18th century (probable)	Two houses, later used for other purposes, rendered on the front, in brick on the right side, with a pantile roof, stone coped gables and shaped kneelers. There are two storeys and four bays. At the left end is a segmental-arched passage entry, and on the rest of the ground floor is a continuous shopfront. The upper floor contains sash windows.	II
74 Castlegate; 54.13376°N 0.79343°W		Late 18th century	The house is in stone on a rendered plinth with a pantile roof. There are two storeys and two bays. To the left is a doorway with a blocked fanlight. To its right is a projecting sash window with a moulded surround and a cornice on short brick piers. Further to the right, and on the upper floor, are sash windows; all the windows have wedge lintels.	II
76 Castlegate; 54.13373°N 0.79328°W		Late 18th century	The house is in stone, with some orange-red brick, and a pantile roof with a coped gable and a shaped kneeler on the right. There are three storeys and three bays. The central doorway has fluted pilasters, imposts, a dentilled cornice and a pediment, and a recessed door with a fanlight. The windows are sashes, some tripartite, and all have wedge lintels.	II
88 Castlegate; 54.13360°N 0.79237°W	—	Late 18th century	The house is in brick, the rear wing is in stone, and it has a pantile roof with stone coped gables and shaped kneelers. There are two storeys and three bays, and the rear wing has three storeys and two bays. The doorway in the left bay has pilasters, a divided fanlight, and a cornice hood on carved brackets. The middle window on the upper floor is blind, and the others are sashes. The windows on the ground floor have wedge lintels, and those on the upper floor have keystones.	II
14 and 16 Finkle Street; 54.13621°N 0.79862°W	—	Late 18th century	Two houses on a corner site, later shops, rendered on the front and left side, and with a stone rear wing, and a pantile roof. There are two storeys and an attic, four bays, and a rear wing on the left with two storeys and one bay. On the ground floor, on the front, are two shopfronts, the left one dating from the 20th century, and the other from the 19th century, and on the upper floor are sash windows with triple keystones.	II
15 Finkle Street; 54.13611°N 0.79847°W	—	Late 18th century	A house and a shop on a corner site, in stone on a plinth on Finkle Street and in painted render on Market Place, with a boxed eaves cornice and a hipped pantile roof. There are three storeys and two bays on each front. On Finkle Street is a double shopfront with fluted pilaster strips, a continuous fascia under a moulded cornice, and a central doorway between canted bay windows. In Market Place is a double shopfront with pilasters and an entablature. The upper floors contain sash windows, those in Finkle Street with wedge lintels.	II
35 and 37 Greengate; 54.13665°N 0.79544°W	—	Late 18th century	A pair of houses in sandstone, with some red brick, a dentilled eaves cornice and a pantile roof. There are two storeys and three bays, and a continuous rear outshut. In the centre are paired doors with fanlights. Above the right doorway are blind windows, and the other windows are sashes. All the openings have wedge lintels.	II
49 Greengate; 54.13587°N 0.79470°W	—	Late 18th century	The house is rendered and has a pantile roof. There are two storeys and two bays. Three steps lead up to a central doorway with a blocked fanlight, and the windows are sashes, those on the upper floor horizontally-sliding.	II
55 and 57 Greengate; 54.13572°N 0.79455°W	—	Late 18th century	A pair of houses in sandstone on the front, and in orange-red and pink and cream mottled brick at the rear, with a pantile roof. There are two storeys and five bays. Each house has a central doorway, the left doorway with a flat arch of voussoirs, the right with a fanlight and a flat arch of gauged brick. In the left bay is a doorway with a wedge lintel set in a blocked elliptical carriage arch. The windows are sashes with flat arches.	II
9, 11 and 13 Market Place; 54.13548°N 0.79960°W	—	Late 18th century	Three houses, later shops, in painted render and brick, with a roof partly of tile and partly of pantile, with gable coping. Nos. 9 and 11 have two storeys and attics and six bays. In the centre is a doorway flanked by shopfronts, the upper floor contains sash windows, and in the attic are three flat dormers and one raking dormer. To the right, No. 13 has three storeys and one bay, with a passage entry on the right and a shopfront. The upper floors contain sash windows, the one on the top floor horizontally-sliding.	II
15 Market Place; 54.13554°N 0.79952°W	—	Late 18th century	A house, later an office, in painted brick, the rear wing in stone, with an eaves band, and a pantile roof with a coped left gable. There are three storeys and two bays, and a rear wing of two storeys and two bays. On the ground floor is a shopfront with fluted pilasters, an entablature, a moulded cornice, and a doorway with a fanlight, between small-pane windows. The upper floors contain sash windows in moulded frames with flat arches and keystones.	II
20 Market Place; 54.13513°N 0.79872°W	—	Late 18th century	A house and shop in painted brick, with a moulded eaves cornice and a pantile roof. There are three storeys and three bays. On the left is a passage entry with an elliptical arch and a moulded cornice. To its right is a shopfront with a doorway between windows, pilasters, and a fascia between grooved and scrolled consoles carrying a moulded cornice. The upper floors contain sash windows with flat arches.	II
22 and 24 Market Place; 54.13517°N 0.79862°W	—	Late 18th century	A shop and offices in painted brick, with a moulded eaves cornice, and a pantile roof with coped gables and shaped kneelers. There are three storeys and three bays. On the ground floor is a 20th-century shopfront and a recessed doorway on the left. The upper floors contain sash windows with flat arches.	II
35 and 37 Market Place; 54.13562°N 0.79894°W	—	Late 18th century	A workshop, and a shop added to the right in the 19th century, both with pantile roofs. The workshop is in painted brick with a moulded eaves cornice, two storeys, two bays, and a single-storey bay on the left. It has a shopfront with pilasters and a cornice, a doorway on the right, a window on the left, and above is a long blind fittings box. To the left and above are sash windows with wedge lintels, and in the left bay is a doorway. The shop is in pink and cream mottled brick, with two storeys and an attic, and three bays. It contains a double shopfront with pilasters, a Greek key band, a fascia and cornice hood on consoles. Above are horizontally-sliding sash windows.	II
40 and 42 Market Place; 54.13568°N 0.79815°W	—	Late 18th century	A house, later a shop, in painted brick, with a moulded eaves cornice and a pantile roof. There are three storeys and an attic, and three bays. On the ground floor is a double shopfront with pilasters and a central doorway, and to the left is a shop window. The middle floor contains a tripartite window, and two sash windows to the right, all with wedge lintels, in the centre of the top floor is a small-pane window, and in the attic are two gabled dormers.	II
51 Market Place; 54.13535°N 0.79865°W	—	Late 18th century (possible)	A shop, rendered and colourwashed at the front and in stone at the rear, with a pantile roof. There are two storeys and two bays. On the ground floor is a door with a fanlight, and a shop window to the left. The upper floor contains two horizontally-sliding sash windows.	II
53 Market Place; 54.13536°N 0.79857°W	—	Late 18th century	A shop on a corner site, in colourwashed render at the front and dark brick at the rear, with a pantile roof and a coped gable. There are three storeys, one bay on the front and two on the left return. On the ground floor is a shopfront extending round the corner, with a doorway in the canted corner between bay windows, with reeded pilasters, an entablature and a dentilled cornice. The windows on the upper floors are sashes with wedge lintels and keystones.	II
57 and 57A Market Place; 54.13546°N 0.79869°W	—	Late 18th century (probable)	A shop and offices in painted render at the front and mottled red brick at the rear, with a pantile roof. There are two storeys and an attic, and two bays. On the ground floor is a shopfront with Ionic pilasters, an entablature and a moulded cornice, and a window flanked by doorways. The upper floor contains sash windows with shouldered surrounds, and in the attic are two gabled dormers.	II
1 Market Street; 54.13438°N 0.79995°W	—	Late 18th century	A house, later a shop, in stone, with a moulded eaves cornice and a pantile roof. There are two storeys and an attic, and two bays. On the ground floor is a shopfront with pilasters and a cornice, the windows with Gothick glazing. The upper floor contains sash windows, and in the attic are two gabled dormers with bargeboards and horizontally-sliding sashes.	II
6 and 8 Market Street; 54.13453°N 0.79971°W	—	Late 18th century	Two shops, later combined, in painted brick with a pantile roof. There are two storeys and an attic, and two bays. On the ground floor are paired shopfronts, the doorways in the middle, with pilasters, and moulded cornices on grooved console brackets. The upper floor contains sash windows with wedge lintels, and in the attic is a flat dormer.	II
10 and 12 Market Street; 54.13465°N 0.79972°W	—	Late 18th century	Two shops in painted brick, with a pantile roof and a coped left gable and shaped kneeler. There are two storeys and an attic, the left shop has two bays, and the right shop has one. On the ground floor of the right shop is a doorway with a blocked fanlight, and to the right is a canted oriel shop window. The left shop has a shopfront with pilasters and a cornice, and a doorway with a fanlight, and between the shops is a passage door. The upper floor contains sash windows with wedge lintels, and in the attic are two flat dormers with horizontally-sliding sashes.	II
11 Market Street; 54.13471°N 0.79996°W	—	Late 18th century	A house, later a shop, rendered and painted on the front, and in orange-red brick at the rear, with a corbel eaves cornice and a pantile roof. There are two storeys and an attic and two bays, and a rear extension. On the ground floor is a shopfront with pilasters and a cornice, a doorway to the right, and a bay window to the left. On the upper floor are sash windows with keystones, and in the attic is a gabled dormer. At the rear are two storeys and two bays, doorways and various windows, mainly sashes.	II
14 and 16 Market Street; 54.13472°N 0.79968°W	—	Late 18th century	A house and a shop in painted brick on a stone plinth with a pantile roof. There are two storeys and attics, and four bays. The shop on the right has a bow window with pilasters and a bracketed cornice, and to the right is a doorway. The house also has a bow window, with a house door and a passage door to the right, each with a fanlight. On the upper floor are sash windows with slightly cambered arches, and in the attic are three gabled dormers.	II
18 Market Street; 54.13480°N 0.79967°W	—	Late 18th century	A house, later a shop, in stone with a pantile roof. There are two storeys and an attic, and two bays. On the ground floor is a double shopfront containing a doorway with a fanlight between plate glass windows, under a continuous fascia and cornice, and to the left is a passage door with a fanlight. The upper floor contains sash windows in architraves with wedge lintels, and in the attic is a gabled dormer.	II
16 Wheelgate; 54.13540°N 0.79666°W	—	Late 18th century	A shop, rendered and painted, with a pantile roof, and a coped gable and a moulded kneeler on the left. There are two storeys and two bays. On the ground floor is a shopfront with pilasters on pedestals, moulded imposts, a moulded cornice, a half-canted window, and a doorway with a fanlight. To the right is another doorway with a fanlight, and on the upper floor are casement windows. On the roof is a gabled dormer.	II
18 Wheelgate; 54.13546°N 0.79669°W	—	Late 18th century	A house, later a shop, it is rendered and painted, with a modillion eaves cornice and a pantile roof. There are two storeys and an attic, and three bays. On the ground floor is a shopfront, with plate glass windows, and a doorway with a blocked fanlight on the left. The upper floors contain sash windows with keystones, and in the attic are two gabled dormers with casements.	II
23A Wheelgate; 54.13547°N 0.79703°W	—	Late 18th century	A house, later a shop, in stone, with a corbelled eaves cornice, and a pantile roof with a coped gable and a moulded kneeler on the left. There are two storeys and an attic, and two bays. On the ground floor is a shopfront with a moulded surround, pilasters, a frieze, and a moulded dentilled cornice. The upper floor contains a sash window on the left, a blocked window on the right, each with a flat arch of voussoirs, and in the attic is a gabled dormer with bargeboards.	II
42 Wheelgate; 54.13616°N 0.79730°W	—	Late 18th century	A house, later a shop, in painted brick with a pantile roof. There are two storeys and an attic, and a single bay. On the ground floor is a shopfront with pilasters, moulded imposts and cornice, and double doors between half-canted shop windows. On the upper floor is a tripartite window with a horizontally-sliding sash and a cambered head, and in the attic is a raking dormer.	II
52 Wheelgate; 54.13641°N 0.79753°W	—	Late 18th century	A house on a corner site, later a shop, in painted brick, with quoins on the left, an eaves cornice, and a pantile roof with a coped gable and moulded kneeler on the left. There are two storeys and three bays. On the ground floor is a 20th-century shopfront, and the upper floor contains sash windows with keystones.	II
2 and 4 Yorkersgate; 54.13480°N 0.79671°W	—	Late 18th century	Two houses, later shops, in painted brick, the ground floor rendered, with a pantile roof. There are three storeys and five bays. On the ground floor are two shopfronts with pilasters, cornices and recessed central doorways, and to the left is a shop window with reeded pilasters and a cornice. The upper floors contain sash windows with cambered arches.	II
5 and 5A Yorkersgate; 54.13463°N 0.79670°W	—	Late 18th century	A house, later a shop, in red brick, the shopfront painted, with a sill band, a stepped brick cornice, and a pantile roof with a coped left gable. There are two storeys and three bays. On the ground floor is a double shopfront with rusticated pilasters and moulded imposts, under a moulded console cornice. The central doorway is flanked by canted shop windows., and to the left is a passage doorway with a patterned fanlight. The upper floor contains sash windows with gauged flat brick arches and keystones.	II
11 Yorkersgate; 54.13449°N 0.79739°W	—	Late 18th century	A house, later used for other purposes, in red brick with stone dressings, chamfered quoins, floor bands, an eaves cornice, and a roof of pantile at the front and slate at the rear, with coped gables and shaped kneelers. There are four storeys and three bays. On the ground floor is a shopfront with a recessed doorway, flanked by canted bay windows with panelled risers, and to the left is a doorway with pilasters, a radial fanlight and a cornice. The windows on the top floor are top-hung, and on the other floors they are sashes with wedge lintels.	II
15, 17 and 17A Yorkersgate; 54.13441°N 0.79784°W	—	Late 18th century (probable)	Two shops, the left in painted brick, and the right in pink and cream mottled brick, with dressings in orange-red brick, quoins, a corbelled eaves cornice and a pantile roof, hipped on the right. There are three storeys and four bays. On the ground floor are two shopfronts, the left modern, the right with panelled pilasters, a frieze with rosettes, and a projecting cornice. Between them is a round-arched doorway with fluted pilasters, a frieze, moulded imposts, a cornice and a fanlight. In each outer bay of the middle floor is a canted bay window. The other windows are sashes with quoined surrounds, those on the middle floor with wedge lintels.	II
25 Yorkersgate; 54.13431°N 0.79846°W	—	Late 18th century	A shop with living accommodation, in painted brick, with an eaves cornice with egg-and-dart moulding, and a pantile roof with stone gable coping and shaped kneelers. There are three storeys and four bays. On the ground floor is a shopfront with cast iron Doric columns, a plain fascia and cornice, and to the right is a round arched passage doorway with a fanlight and a triple keystone. The upper floors contain sash windows with keystones.	II
29–39 Yorkersgate; 54.13422°N 0.79923°W	—	Late 18th century	A row of four houses, later used for other purposes, in stone and painted render, with one roof of slate and the others of pantile. The left house has two storeys and an attic, the others have two storeys, and there is a total of eleven bays. On the ground floor are 20th-century shopfronts. Most of the windows on the upper floor are sashes, in the left house are two windows with triple keystones, and an impost band rising to hood moulds over the windows, and the adjacent house has two windows with pilasters and a cornice on shaped brackets.	II
40 and 42 Yorkersgate; 54.13435°N 0.79948°W	—	Late 18th century	An inn, later offices, the building is in stone on a plinth, and has a pantile roof with a coped right gable and a shaped kneeler. There are two storeys and an attic, and six bays. On the front are two doorways with fanlights, the left one set in a blocked segmental carriage arch. Most of the windows are sashes with flat arches of voussoirs, there is one small horizontally-sliding sash, and in the attic are two gabled dormers.	II
46, 48 and 50 Yorkersgate; 54.13430°N 0.80006°W		Late 18th century	A terrace of three houses in sandstone with a pantile roof, hipped on the right, and with gable copings to the left. There are two storeys, cellars and attics, and a total of six bays. On the front are three doorways with fanlights, one with a bracketed hood, and two canted bay windows. The other windows are sashes with flat arches of voussoirs, and in the attics are three raking dormers.	II
Greengate House; 54.13626°N 0.79505°W	—	Late 18th century	The house is in red brick on a sandstone plinth, with painted stone dressings, a floor band and a sill band, an eaves cornice, and a hipped slate roof. There are two storeys and an attic, and five bays, a two-storey two-bay rear wing, and a two-storey one-bay staircase wing. In the centre is a doorway with detached Doric columns, a semicircular fanlight, a fluted frieze, a dentilled cornice, and a pediment. The windows are sashes with flat brick gauged arches. In the staircase wing is a Venetian window, and both wings have coped gables and shaped kneelers.	II
St Michael's House; 54.13494°N 0.79997°W	—	Late 18th century	A house, later offices, the front in stone, the right side in red brick, the left side rendered, and a rear wing in stone. It has quoins, a floor band, an eaves cornice, and a pantile roof with coped gables and shaped kneelers. There are three storeys, an attic and a basement, five bays, and a rear wing. Three steps lead up to the central doorway that has an architrave, a fanlight, and a moulded cornice hood on decorative brackets. Above this is a shallow parapet pierced by roundels, and a window with a pulvinated frieze and a pediment. Flanking the doorway are bow windows, and at the right end is a doorway with panelled pilasters and a dentilled cornice. The windows are sashes in architraves with keystones, and in the attic is a flat dormer.	II
The Cross Keys Public House; 54.13625°N 0.79771°W		Late 18th century	The public house incorporates a 15th-century undercroft. The ground floor is refaced in red brick with quoins, below is a rendered basement, the upper floor is roughcast and whitewashed, and there is a pantile roof with coped gables and rounded kneelers. There are two storeys and a basement, and four bays. The entrance has a round arch containing a flight of steps leading to an internal doorway. This is flanked by recessed bow windows, and at the right is a five-light window; all contain casements and are under segmental arches. The upper floor contains sash windows.	II*
The Golden Lion Public House; 54.13575°N 0.79928°W		Late 18th century	The public house is in red brick at the front, the ground floor and the left return are rendered, and it is in stone at the rear. It has a moulded eaves cornice, and a pantile roof with coped gables and kneelers. There are three storeys and three bays, and a rear extension. In the centre is a doorway with a fanlight, flanked by canted bay windows. The upper floors contain sash windows with wedge lintels and keystones, and the middle window on the top floor is blocked and contains the silhouette of a lion.	II
Wheelgate House; 54.13571°N 0.79686°W	—	Late 18th century	A terrace of houses, later two shops, the front rendered and painted, the rear in stone, and a pantile roof with a coped gable on the right. There are three storeys and attics, nine bays, and a plain parapet with sunk panels. On the ground floor are two 20th-century shopfronts, the upper floors contain sash windows, and in the attic are three gabled dormers.	II
72 Castlegate; 54.13379°N 0.79353°W		c. 1800	A public house, later a private house, in stone with a pantile roof. There are two storeys and attics, and two bays. On the left is a passage entry with a wedge lintel. To the right is a doorway with panelled pilasters, moulded imposts and cornice, and a recessed door with a fanlight. To its left is a tripartite window, to its right and on the upper floor are sash windows; all the windows have wedge lintels. In the attic are two gabled dormers.	II
78 Castlegate; 54.13370°N 0.79315°W		c. 1800	The house is in orange-red brick, with paired eaves brackets, and a pantile roof with coped gables and moulded kneelers. There are three storeys and four bays. The doorway has a divided fanlight, and the windows are sashes. All the openings have flat arches of gauged brick and wedge lintels.	II
Malton Methodist Church; 54.13505°N 0.79766°W		1811	The church is in pink and cream mottled brick on a stone plinth, with dressings of stone and orange-red brick, a floor band, a sill band, an eaves band, and a hipped pantile roof. There are two storeys and a front of five bays, the middle three bays projecting under a pediment containing a scrolled datestone. Steps lead up to the central doorway that has engaged Tuscan columns, a semicircular traceried fanlight, a plain frieze and a moulded dentilled cornice. This is flanked by doors with similar fanlights, and the outer bays and the upper floor contain round-headed windows with Y-tracery. All the openings are in round-headed recesses. Over the outer bays is a plain coped parapet.	II*
Assembly Rooms and The Milton Rooms; 54.13442°N 0.79903°W		1814	The Assembly Rooms face Yorkersgate, and have a front in cream brick on a stone plinth, and a hipped slate roof. There are two storeys and five bays. In the centre are double doors approached by steps, recessed in an architrave with a moulded cornice hood. The windows are sashes with flat gauged brick heads. Above the upper window is a long inscribed and dated panel. At the rear, The Milton Rooms face Market Place, and are in orange-red brick on a stone plinth, with stone dressings, chamfered quoins and a pantile roof. There are two storeys and an attic, and a gabled front. In the centre is a portico of three flat arches on square pillars with imposts, a modillion cornice and a balustraded parapet. Above are three tall windows and a balcony.	II
14 Saville Street; 54.13523°N 0.79780°W		1815	A Congregational chapel, later used for other purposes, in painted stucco, rusticated on the ground floor, on a stone plinth, the rear in pink and cream mottled brick. On the front is a floor band, and moulded cornices to the eaves and the pediment, and a hipped slate roof. There are two storeys and five bays, the middle three bays projecting slightly under the pediment, between Ionic pilasters and an entablature. The outer bays contain doorways with architraves and massive triple keystones, the centre stone vermiculated, and the windows between have segmental heads. On the upper floor, the windows have two lights and round-arched architraves.	II
Malton Meeting House and walls 54.13690°N 0.79657°W		1823	The Quaker meeting house is in pink and cream mottled brick on a sandstone plinth, with sandstone dressings, a sill band, a moulded eaves cornice, and a hipped slate roof. There is one tall storey and six bays. On the front is a doorway, above which is a blocked square opening. The windows are sashes, and all the openings have flat arches of gauged brick. The walls, some pre-dating the meeting house, are in brick with flat stone coping, and they enclose the burial ground.	II*
Caretaker's House, Malton Meeting House; 54.13668°N 0.79632°W	—	1823	The house is in pink and cream mottled brick, with an eaves band and slate roof. There are two storeys, one bay facing the road, and two bays on the left return. The windows are sashes with cambered arches. In the left return is a doorway with a cambered head, and an upper floor extension on posts.	II
14 and 16 Castlegate; 54.13437°N 0.79608°W	—	Early 19th century	A house, later two shops, in orange-red brick, with a pantile roof and a coped left gable and a moulded kneeler. There are two storeys and an attic, and three bays. On the ground floor are shopfronts with panelled pilasters on moulded bases, dentiled moulded imposts, a panelled frieze and a moulded cornice. In the centre are two elliptical arches with keystones, and doors with fanlights. The upper floor contains sash windows with wedge lintels, and in the attic are three raking dormers.	II
51 and 52 Castlegate; 54.13388°N 0.79437°W	—	Early 19th century	A pair of houses in pink and cream mottled brick, painted blow the ground floor windows, with a pantile roof, stone gable copings and moulded kneelers. There are three storeys and a basement, and four bays. In the outer bays are doorways, the left with a fanlight, the right approached by steps. The windows are sashes, and all the openings have painted wedge lintels.	II
94 and 96 Castlegate; 54.13362°N 0.79198°W		Early 19th century	A pair of houses in stone, with a stone coped left gable and shaped kneeler. There are two storeys, the left house has three bays and the right house has one. The right house contains a doorway with a fanlight and a sash window on each floor. In the centre of the left house is a round-headed doorway with a radial fanlight and a keystone. To its left is an elliptical-arched carriage entrance with a quoined surround and a keystone, and to its right is a sash window with a keystone. In the middle bay of the upper floor is a blind window, flanked by horizontally-sliding sashes.	II
45 Greengate; 54.13612°N 0.79491°W	—	Early 19th century	A house, rendered on the front and right side, in pink and cream mottled brick at the rear, with a moulded eaves band, and a pantile roof with a coped gable and shaped kneeler on the right. There are two storeys and four bays. On the front is a doorway with a fanlight and a flat hood on brackets, the windows are sashes, and all the openings have wedge lintels.	II
74 Greengate; 54.13560°N 0.79465°W	—	Early 19th century	A house in pink and cream mottled brick on a plinth, with a pantile roof. There are two storeys and two bays. One step leads up to a doorway in the left bay with a fanlight, the windows are sashes, and all the openings have wedge lintels.	II
16 and 18 Market Place; 54.13506°N 0.79884°W		Early 19th century	Two houses, later shops, in painted brick, with quoins, a sill band and a pantile roof. There are three storeys and four bays. On the ground floor are two shopfronts with columns, and paired doorways in the centre under a continuous fascia and cornice. The upper floors contain sash windows.	II
48–56 Market Place; 54.13600°N 0.79836°W	—	Early 19th century	A terrace of five houses, later a shop and flats, in pink and cream mottled brick, with red brick dressings, eaves cornices, and a pantile roof with a coped right gable. There are three storeys and five bays. On the ground floor are 20th-century shopfronts, and the upper floors contain tripartite sash windows with quoined surrounds and cambered brick arches.	II
7 and 9 Market Street; 54.13481°N 0.79998°W	—	Early 19th century	A pair of houses, later shops, rendered at the front and rear, the gable walls in brick, with a moulded eaves cornice, and a pantile roof. There are three storeys and four bays. The left shop has a double shopfront with a doorway between plate glass windows, to its right is a passage entry, and further to the right is a single shopfront. On the first floor of the left shop are top-hung windows, and the other windows on both upper floors are sashes.	II
39 Old Maltongate and railings 54.13561°N 0.79439°W		Early 19th century	The house is in sandstone on a rendered plinth, with a paired modillion eaves cornice, and a pantile roof with coped gables and shaped kneelers. There are two storeys and three bays. Five steps flanked by cast iron railings and handrails lead up to the central doorway that has a fanlight and a flat hood on brackets. The windows are sashes, and all the openings have flat arches of voussoirs.	II
8 Saville Street; 54.13487°N 0.79766°W	—	Early 19th century	A house and a shop in pink and cream mottled brick, with stone dressings, a floor band, a coped parapet, and a pantile roof. There are three storeys and two bays. On the ground floor is a 20th-century shopfront, and the upper floors contain sash windows with wedge lintels.	II
12 Saville Street; 54.13514°N 0.79779°W	—	Early 19th century	A house and a shop in pink and cream mottled brick, painted on the ground floor, with a floor band and a coped parapet. There are three storeys and two bays. In the centre of the ground floor is a segmental-arched window, flanked by round-headed doorways, both with fanlights, the right doorway recessed. The upper floors contain sash windows with wedge lintels.	II
16 Saville Street; 54.13533°N 0.79790°W	—	Early 19th century	A house, later used for other purposes, on a corner site, in pink and cream mottled brick on a stone plinth, with a grooved eaves cornice, and a pantile roof hipped on the left. There are two storeys, three bays on the front, and two on the left return. The central recessed doorway has reeded pilasters, a fluted frieze and a modillion cornice hood. This is flanked by round-headed sash windows, and on the upper floor are sash windows with flat heads and wedge lintels. In the left return is a Venetian window with gauged brick arches.	II
6 St Michael Street; 54.13558°N 0.79758°W		Early 19th century	A house and a shop in sandstone with a slate roof. There are two storeys, three bays, and a rear single-storey outshut. To the right is a shopfront with pilasters, a cornice, a door with a fanlight, a two-light shop window, and a canopy blind box. To its left is a doorway with a fanlight, and further to the left and on the upper floor are sash windows. The openings have flat arches of voussoirs, and at the rear are horizontally-sliding sashes.	II
8 St Michael Street; 54.13552°N 0.79776°W		Early 19th century	A house and a shop in sandstone with a pantile roof. There are two storeys and three bays. To the left is a shopfront with pilasters and a cornice, a doorway and plate glass windows. To its right is a recessed doorway, and further to the right and on the upper floor are sash windows. All the openings have flat arches of voussoirs.	II
1–15 The Shambles; 54.13574°N 0.79966°W		Early 19th century	A row of eight shops and offices in painted brick on a stone plinth with an overhanging slate roof on shaped brackets, hipped and curved at the ends. There is a single storey and eight bays. They contain shopfronts and various windows.	II
2–16 The Shambles; 54.13578°N 0.79956°W		Early 19th century	A row of eight shops and offices in painted brick on a stone plinth with an overhanging slate roof on shaped brackets, hipped and curved at the ends. There is a single storey and eight bays. They contain shopfronts and various windows. Between Nos. 10 and 12 is a passage doorway.	II
14 Wheelgate; 54.13536°N 0.79660°W	—	Early 19th century	A house, later a shop, rendered at the front, with a fasciated eaves cornice, and a pantile roof with coped gables and shaped kneelers. There are three storeys and two bays. On the ground floor is shopfront with pilasters, and a moulded cornice on grooved consoles, and on the upper floors are sash windows.	II
31 and 33 Wheelgate; 54.13588°N 0.79739°W	—	Early 19th century	Two houses, later a shop, in painted brick on a painted plinth, with a pantile roof, coped gables and shaped kneelers. There are three storeys and four bays. On the ground floor is a shopfront with recessed doorways, and the upper floor contain sash windows, those on the middle floor with wedge lintels.	II
35 Wheelgate; 54.13595°N 0.79746°W	—	Early 19th century	A house, later a shop, in pink and cream mottled brick, painted at the front, with a cogged eaves course, and a slate roof. There are three storeys and two bays. On the ground floor is a shopfront with pilasters and a cornice, and the upper floors contain sash windows.	II
7 and 7A Yorkersgate; 54.13458°N 0.79686°W	—	Early 19th century	A works, later a shop, on a corner site, in painted brick, with an eaves cornice on brackets, and a pantile roof, hipped on the corner, and with stone gable copings elsewhere. There are three storeys and four bays on Yorkersgate, two storeys and three bays on Railway Street, and a canted corner bay. Most of the ground floor is occupied by a 20th-century shopfront, and in Railway Street is a doorway with a fanlight. On the upper floors are sash windows, those in Railway Street with a sill band and hood moulds.	II
9 Yorkersgate; 54.13449°N 0.79718°W	—	Early 19th century	Two houses, later a shop, on a corner site, in pink and cream mottled brick, with orange-red brick dressings, quoins, and a pantile roof with coped gables. There are three storeys and a front of three bays. On the ground floor is a shopfront extending round the corner. The upper floors contain sash windows with quoined surrounds and flat brick arches. At the rear is a blocked carriage arch, and in the left return is a round-arched stair window.	II
18 and 18A Yorkersgate and 1 Saville Street; 54.13462°N 0.79775°W	—	Early 19th century	Three shops on a corner site in pink and cream mottled brick, with quoins, a sill band, an eaves cornice, and a hipped slate roof. There are two storeys, three bays on Yorkersgate, and five on Saville Street. On the ground floor are four shopfronts, and in Saville Street are two doorways, the left with pilasters, a fanlight, and a cornice hood on brackets, and the right is a passage doorway. On the upper floor, most of the windows are sashes with gauged brick arches.	II
30 Yorkersgate and railings 54.13449°N 0.79846°W		Early 19th century	A bank, later offices, in orange-red brick at the rear, refronted in stone, with a slate roof and stone coping and shaped kneelers at the rear. There are three storeys and three bays. In the centre, steps with cast iron railings lead up to a doorway with a radial fanlight, and to the right is a similar doorway converted into a window. The outer bays project, and contain paired round-headed windows, and all the openings have architraves with keystones. Above is a moulded corbel cornice, and a plain parapet on grooved volutes. On the middle floor are sash windows with moulded cornice hoods, and the top floor contains segmental-arched sash windows in architraves with keystones. Above is a moulded modillion cornice and a plain coped parapet.	II
House to rear of 30 Yorkersgate; 54.13460°N 0.79851°W	—	Early 19th century	The house is in orange-red brick, with stone dressings, a sill band, an eaves cornice, and a pantile roof with coped gables and shaped kneelers. There are two storeys and three bays. Steps lead to the central doorway that has a fanlight, and it is flanked by segmental-headed tripartite sash windows. Above the doorway is a blind window, and it is flanked by sashes.	II
34 Yorkersgate; 54.13443°N 0.79884°W	—	Early 19th century	A house on a corner site in red brick, with a floor band, a moulded eaves cornice, and a pantile roof with a coped gable and a shaped kneeler on the right. There are three storeys and an attic, and one bay on the front. The doorway is in the right return and above it is a round-arched stair window. The windows on the front are tripartite with cambered heads, and elsewhere there are sash windows, one horizontally-sliding.	II
Ryedale Conservative Club; 54.13536°N 0.79827°W	—	Early 19th century	A house, later a club, in pink and cream mottled brick on a stone plinth, with red brick dressings, an eaves course, and a pantile roof with coped gables and shaped kneelers. There are three storeys and three bays. The central doorway has a radial fanlight and an open pediment. Above it is a doorway and an iron balustraded balcony on scrolled consoles. In the outer bays of the lower two floors are tripartite sash windows with elliptical heads, the central window on the top floor is a sash, and this is flanked by tripartite casements. All the windows have quoined surrounds.	II
Crown Hotel; 54.13526°N 0.79650°W	—	1827	The public house is in painted brick on a stone plinth, in pink and cream mottled brick at the rear, with stone dressings, and a corrugated pantile roof with a coped gable on the left. There are two storeys and attics, and four bays. The doorway has pilasters, a fanlight and a cornice. The windows are sashes with wedge lintels, and in the attics are gabled dormers with sashes and kneelers.	II
76 Greengate and 37 Old Maltongate; 54.13553°N 0.79458°W		c. 1840	Two houses on a corner site, in pink and cream mottled brick on a plinth, with dressings in orange-red brick and stone, and a slate roof with coped gables and moulded finials. There are two storeys and an L-shaped plan, with three gabled bays on each front. On Old Maltongate is a central doorway with a sash window to the right between giant pilasters. All the other windows on the front are sashes with flat arches and triple keystones, those on the upper floor in half-dormers. On Greengate, the windows are similar, and there is a central doorway with a fanlight.	II
Former Palace Cinema and Shop; 54.13476°N 0.79843°W		1845	Originally a corn exchange, it was converted into a cinema in about 1910, and later enlarged into a shopping mall. The entrance to the cinema, on the left, is in painted stone, and has two storeys and five bays, and the shop is in red brick with two storeys and three bays. The cinema has a tetrastyle portico with giant Corinthian pilasters, and a modillion cornice and pediment. Above the entrance is a balcony and three tall metal-framed windows. The shop has a shopfront on the ground floor, with a recessed doorway between half-canted shop windows. Above are two-light mullioned casement windows, and a pantile roof.	II
10 and 12 Castlegate; 54.13440°N 0.79621°W	—	Mid-19th century	A pair of shops on a corner site, in pink and cream mottled brick, with orange-red brick quoins, an eaves band, and a slate roof, hipped on the corner. There are two storeys and an attic, three bays on Castlegate and four on Wells Lane. There are two doorways, one on the canted corner, with arched heads and fanlights. On the ground floor are three large segmental-arched shop windows. In Wells Lane are two round-arched niches, and a round-arched doorway to the right. The other windows are sashes with flat brick arches, and there is a gabled dormer.	II
18 and 20 Castlegate; 54.13428°N 0.79578°W		Mid-19th century	A pair of houses, later used for other purposes, in pink and cream mottled brick, painted on No. 18. The roof of No. 18 is in tile, and that of No. 20 is in corrugated pantile. There are two storeys and six bays. In the left bay is a segmental-arched doorway with an eared surround and a grooved volute keystone. To the right are two shopfronts, the right with pilasters, moulded imposts, corbels, a frieze and a dentilled cornice. The left shopfront has cast iron columns, a dentiled moulded cornice, and double doors with a fanlight between half-canted plate glass windows. The upper floor contains sash windows with cambered arches.	II
47 and 49 Market Place; 54.13528°N 0.79878°W	—	Mid-19th century	A shop on a corner site, in red brick on a stone plinth, in stone at the rear, with stone dressings, a painted band, a cogged string course, and a pantile roof. There are two stores and an attic, one bay on the gabled front, and four bays on the right return. In the canted corner is a shopfront containing a central doorway with a fanlight, fluted panelled pilasters with moulded imposts, an entablature with paired fluted brackets, and a dentilled cornice. Above and in the return are sash windows. In the right bays of the return are a doorway and a shop window.	II
55 Market Place; 54.13541°N 0.79860°W	—	19th century	A shop in painted rendered brick, grooved on the ground floor, with a pantile roof. There are three storeys, one bay on the gabled front, and two bays on the left return, the upper storey jettied on stepped corbels. On the front of the ground floor is a shopfront with pilasters and a cornice, a doorway with a fanlight, and a canted window. Most of the windows are sashes, some horizontally-sliding.	II
64 Wheelgate; 54.13659°N 0.79791°W	—	Mid-19th century	A shop in pink and cream mottled brick with orange-red brick dressings, a moulded eaves cornice, and a pantile roof hipped on the right. There are two storeys and three bays on the front, and two storeys with an attic, and two bays on the right return. Extending round the corner is a shopfront with doorways,pilasters, moulded imposts and a moulded cornice. The windows on both floors are sashes with gauged brick arches, cambered on the ground floor. On the left is a roof light, and on the return is a raking dormer.	II
32 Yorkersgate; 54.13446°N 0.79863°W		Mid-19th century	An office in pink and cream mottled brick on a painted plinth, with quoins, a sill band, a floor band, a moulded eaves band, and a pantile roof. There are two storeys and an attic, and four bays. Five steps in the second bay lead up to a doorway with a quoined surround, a fanlight, and a flat arch of stepped voussoirs. The windows are sashes, those on the ground floor over sunk panels, and in the attic are two dormers.	II
38 Yorkersgate; 54.13437°N 0.79922°W		Mid-19th century	An office in pink and cream mottled brick, with orange-red brick dressings, quoins and a pantile roof. There are three storeys and three bays. The central doorway has a fanlight, and above it is a single-light sash window. The windows in the outer bays are tripartite, and all the openings have cambered brick arches.	II
National Westminster Bank; 54.13426°N 0.79869°W		1866	The bank is in sandstone on a plinth at the front, in pink and cream mottled brick at the rear, with moulded floor, impost and eaves bands, a cornice on console brackets, a sunk panelled parapet with urn finials, and a slate roof. There are two storeys and seven bays. In the middle and outer bays are doorways in architraves, with segmental-headed fanlights and keystones. The windows are round-headed sashes with aprons, those on the ground floor with Gibbs surrounds, those on the upper floor with architraves, and all with grooved keystones. Below the middle window on the upper floor is a balustraded parapet with urn finials.	II
13 Yorkersgate; 54.13446°N 0.79756°W	—	Late 19th century	A house, later used for other purposes, in painted brick, with stone dressings, a moulded eaves cornice over a band, and a slate roof. There are three storeys and three bays. On the ground floor are two shopfronts, the left single, the right double, with panelled pilasters on shaped bases, and a projecting consoles cornice on paired carved brackets. In the right bay of the middle floor is an oriel window with a moulded cornice and a hipped roof. The other windows are sashes, those on the middle floor with cambered heads. Each of the upper floors contains an impost band rising to form a hood mould over the windows.	II
25 Market Place; 54.13587°N 0.79909°W		c. 1900	A shop and a flat in red brick, with a moulded eaves cornice, and a tile roof with a coped right gable and shaped kneeler. There are two storeys and an attic, and three bays. On the ground floor is a shopfront with a tiled riser, pilasters and dentilled imposts, a fascia, and a cornice on grooved corbels. To the left is a doorway with a fanlight, the upper floor contains sash windows with cambered brick arches, and in the attic is a flat dormer.	II
Post Office; 54.13607°N 0.79716°W		c. 1910	The Post Office is in red brick on a stone plinth, with orange-red brick dressings, quoins, a moulded eaves cornice with mutules, and a tile mansard roof with coped gables. There are two storeys and an attic, and five bays. The central doorway has an architrave, a fanlight, and a modillion flat hood on massive foliate console brackets. To its right is a tripartite window incorporating a posting box, to the left is a pair of sash windows, on each side under a segmental arch with a keystone. The upper floor contains sash windows with aprons, and in the attic are five dormers, the outer two with flat heads, and the others with segmental pediments.	II
Telephone kiosk adjacent to 17 Market Place; 54.13561°N 0.79937°W		1935	The K6 type telephone kiosk was designed by Giles Gilbert Scott. Constructed in cast iron with a square plan and a dome, it has three unperforated crowns in the top panels.	II
Pair of telephone kiosks adjacent to the Post Office; 54.13598°N 0.79717°W		1935	The K6 type telephone kiosks were designed by Giles Gilbert Scott. Constructed in cast iron with a square plan and a dome, they have three unperforated crowns in the top panels.	II
