= The Shambles, Malton =

Street in Malton, North Yorkshire, England

Coordinates: 54°08′09″N 0°47′58″W

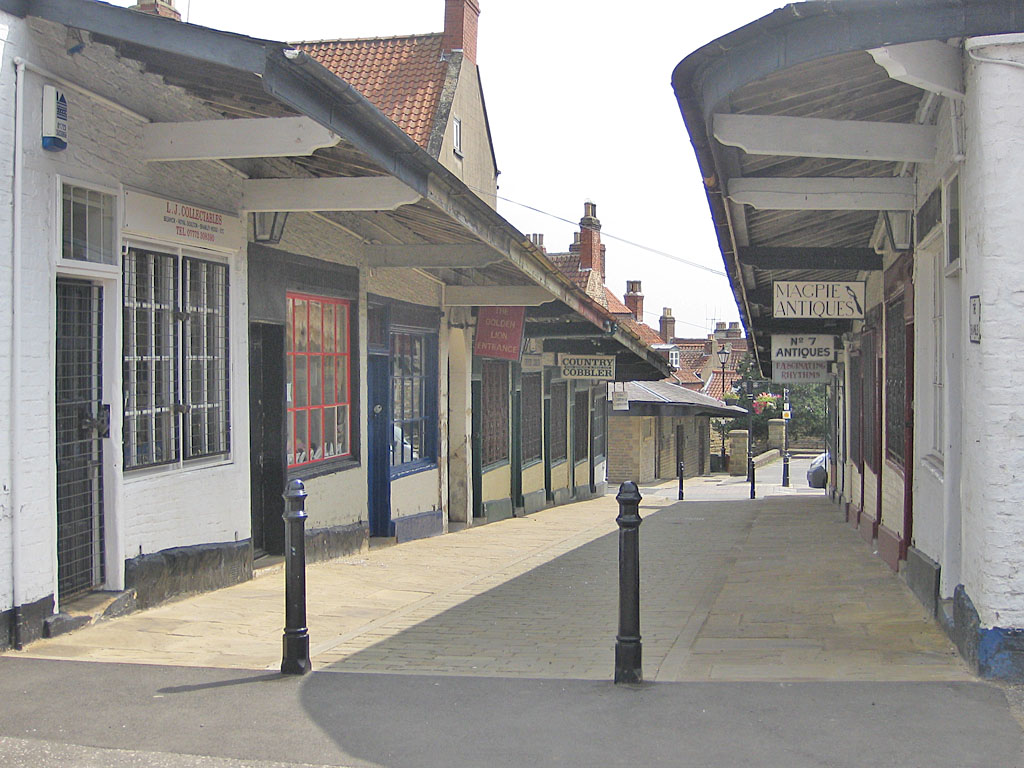
The street, in 2011

The Shambles is a street in Malton, North Yorkshire, a town in England.

The name "Shambles" refers to slaughterhouses and associated butchers' shops. The shambles in Malton was historically alongside St Michael's Church, but in 1826, William Fitzwilliam, 4th Earl Fitzwilliam, commissioned a replacement street of butchers' shops off the north side of the marketplace, leading to his new cattle market. Two terraces of eight shops were constructed, facing each other across the narrow street. The shops were altered in the 20th century, with work including the replacement of their windows. They now contain a mixture of shops and offices. Each terrace was grade II listed in 1993.

The shops are constructed of painted brick on a stone plinth with an overhanging slate roof on shaped brackets, hipped and curved at the ends. They have a single storey and each shop is a single bay wide. They contain shopfronts and various windows. Between numbers 10 and 12 is a passage doorway. Inside, the majority retain an altered fireplace.

== See also ==
- Listed buildings in Malton, North Yorkshire (central area)
