= Milton Rooms =

Arts centre in North Yorkshire, England

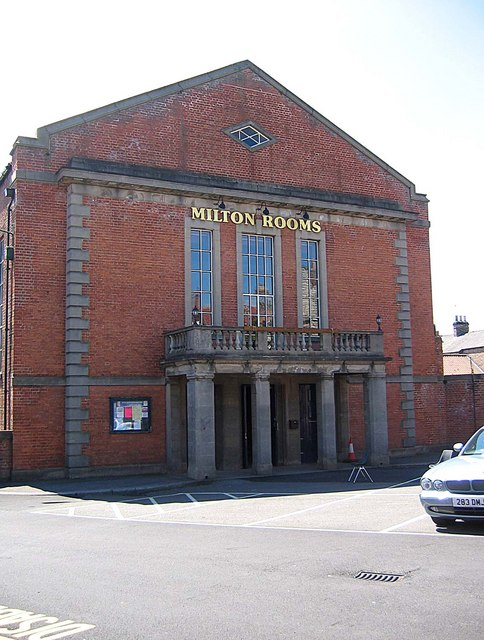
The Milton Rooms in 2008

The Milton Rooms is an arts centre and hub for cultural and community led activities (including theatre, comedy, dance, exhibitions, music and auctions) located in Malton, North Yorkshire, a market town in England. The complex is a Grade II listed building.

The main body of the building was built in 1930 by the Fitzwilliam family over the 19th century Masonic Lodge which is still in use. The complex includes a theatre with the largest sprung dance floor in North Yorkshire, the assembly rooms and the studio bar.

The assembly rooms, at the back of the complex and facing into Yorkersgate, were formerly the Literary Institute and Subscription Rooms commissioned by the Fitzwilliam family in 1814.

The Milton Rooms was given its name by the Fitzwilliam family and originates from their family home Milton Hall.

== See also ==
- Listed buildings in Malton, North Yorkshire (central area)
