= Malton, North Yorkshire =

Market town and civil parish in England

Coordinates: 54°08′19″N 0°47′57″W

Malton
- town
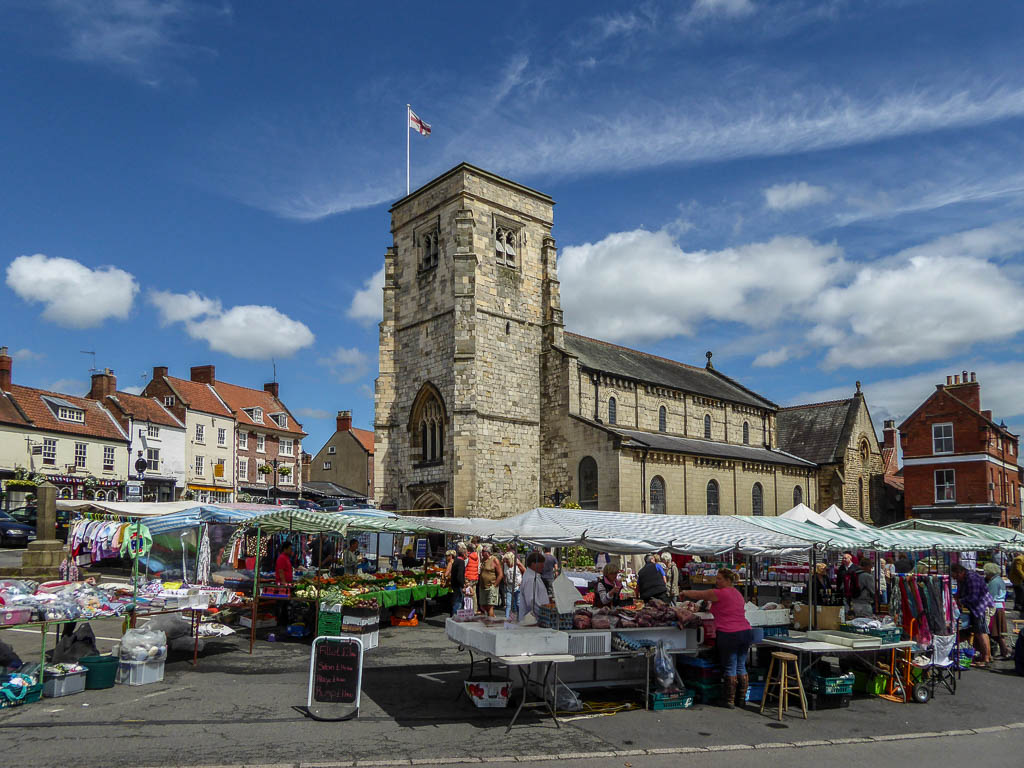
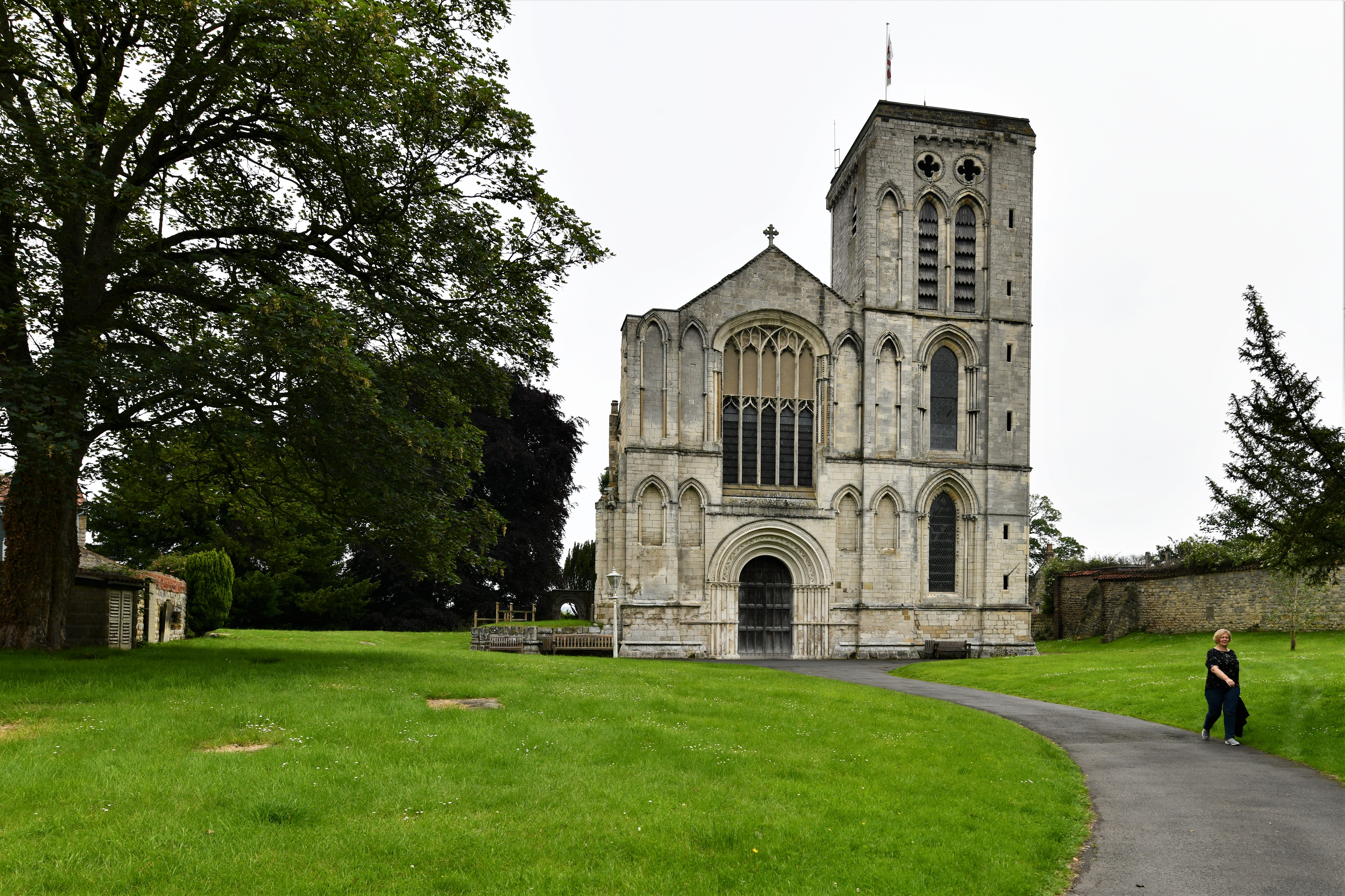
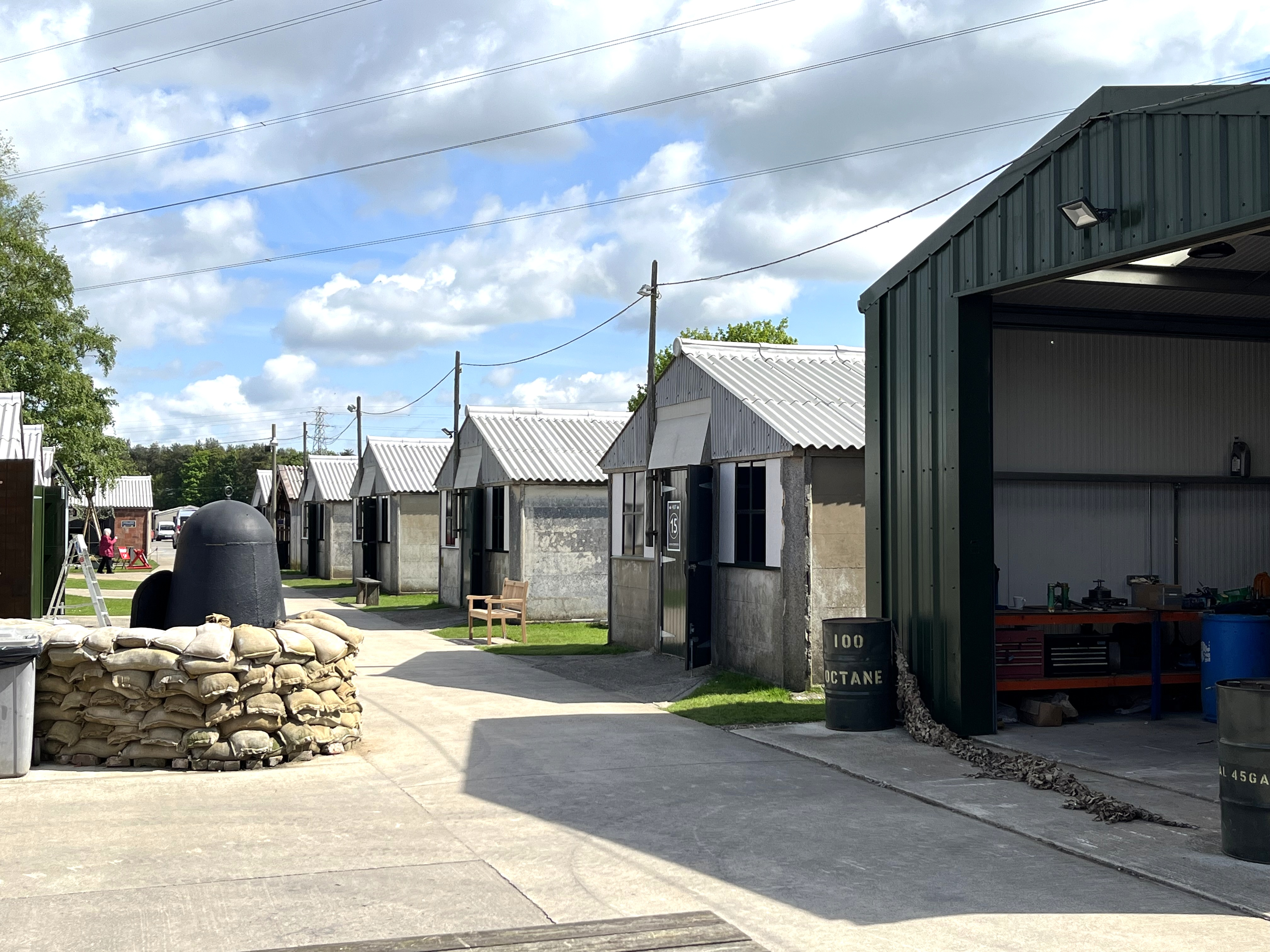
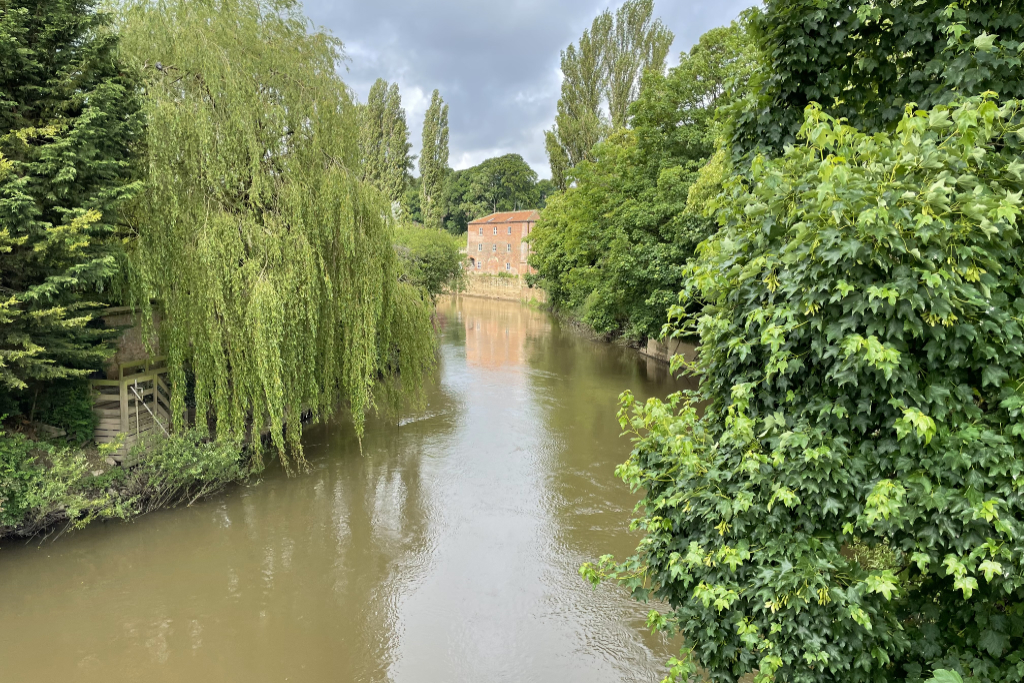
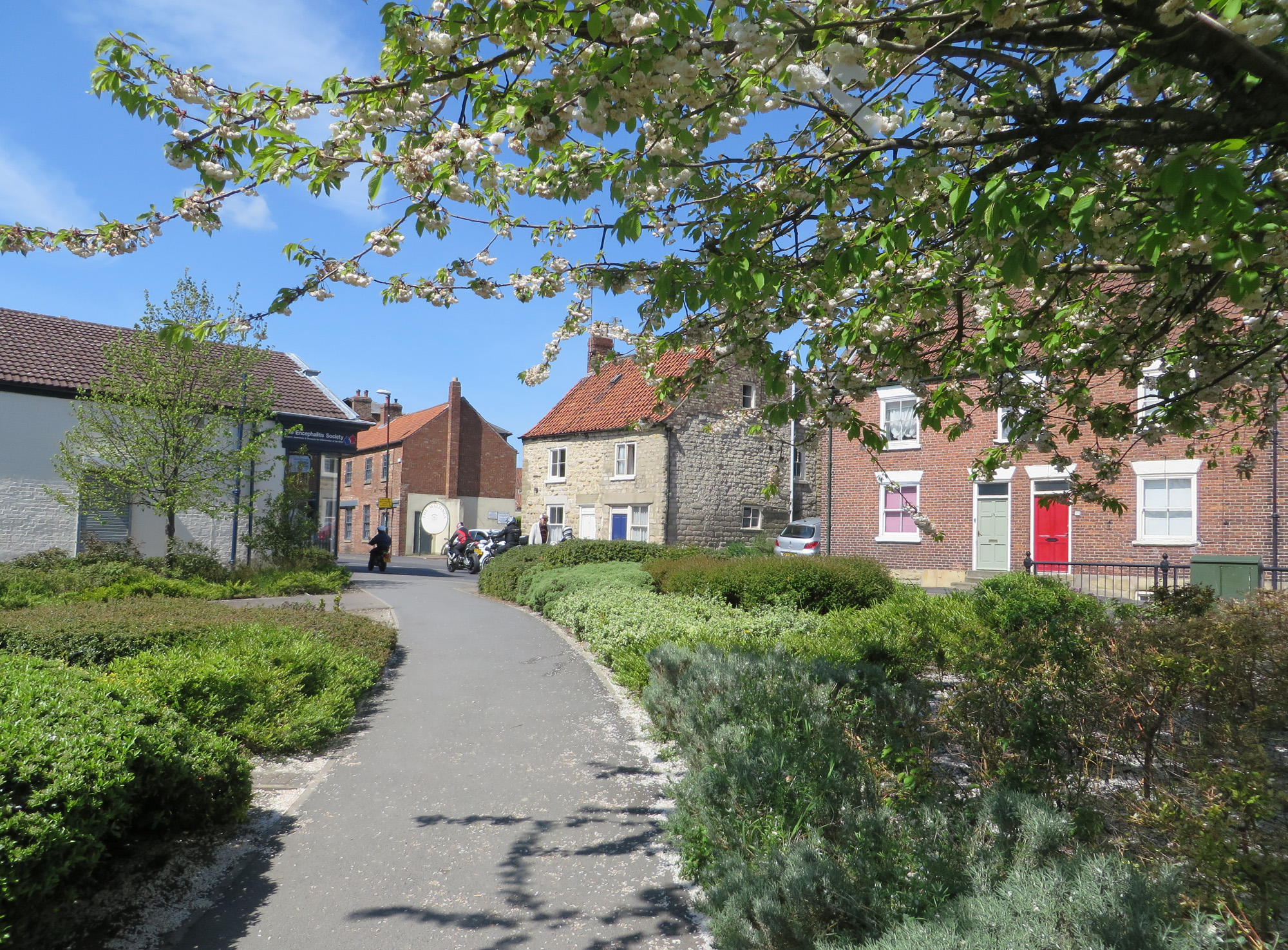
- Market Place Malton Priory Eden Camp Museum River Derwent Castlegate

- Location within North Yorkshire
- Population: 4,888 (2011 census)
- OS grid reference: SE788722
  - London: 180 mi (290 km) S
- Unitary authority: North Yorkshire
- Ceremonial county: North Yorkshire
- Region: Yorkshire and the Humber
- Country: England
- Sovereign state: United Kingdom
- Post town: MALTON
- Postcode district: YO17
- Dialling code: 01653
- Police: North Yorkshire
- Fire: North Yorkshire
- Ambulance: Yorkshire
- UK Parliament: Thirsk and Malton

Malton is a market town, civil parish and electoral ward in North Yorkshire, England. Historically part of the North Riding of Yorkshire, the town has a population measured for both the civil parish and the electoral ward at the 2011 Census as 4,888.

The town is located to the north of the River Derwent, which forms the historic boundary between the North and East Ridings of Yorkshire.

Until 2023 the town was part of the Ryedale District and was the location of the headquarters of the district council.

Facing Malton on the other side of the Derwent is Norton. The Karro Food Group (formerly known as Malton Bacon Factory), Malton bus station and Malton railway station are located in Norton-on-Derwent.

Malton is the local area's commercial and retail centre. In the town centre there are small traditional independent shops and high-street names.

Malton has been described as "the food capital of Yorkshire" and was voted one of the best places to live in Britain by The Sunday Times in both the 2017 and 2018 lists.

Malton was named the dog-friendliest town in the UK at the annual Dog Friendly Awards, in association with the Kennel Club, in 2018/19. In 2020 Malton was named as one of the most dog-friendly staycation spots in the UK and the best in Yorkshire.

== History ==
=== British ===
A seven-foot-long British oak canoe was found on the farm of Mr Hebden Flowers of South Holme in 1869. The relic was taken to Malton, being intended for the Yorkshire Philosophical Society's museum. Moreover, a skeleton similar to the one found at Kirkby Misperton Hall in 1866 was found beneath the clay in the coffer dam. These skeletons were buried in the customary British fashion, with the knees drawn up to the chin. A flint axe was also found some 150 yards away from the Derwent, near the old entrenchments, in 1868.

=== Roman ===
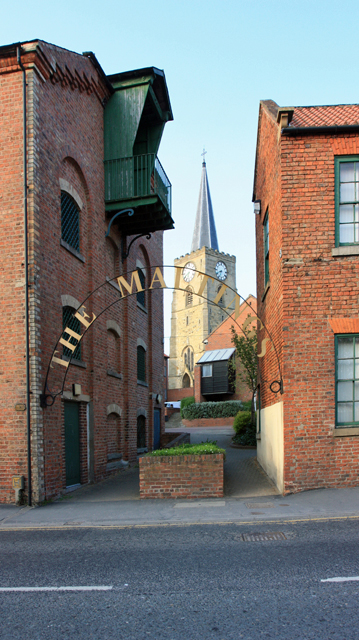
View of St Leonards Catholic church through the Maltings

The earliest established building in Malton dates from the late first century AD when a Roman auxiliary fort was established, probably c. 71 AD under the governor Petilius Cerialis around the same time as Eboracum, although it has been suggested that both sites may be slightly earlier. The site was established on the north bank of the River Derwent. A large civilian settlement developed opposite the fort, on the south of the river at Norton. A single Roman cavalry unit, the Ala Gallorum Picentiana, is recorded from the site. The Romans left in 429AD when the empire collapsed.

The site remained occupied (and subject to continued development) throughout the four centuries of Roman occupation in Britain, particularly in the Trajanic, Severan, Constantian and Theodosian periods and is notable for the manufacture of jet jewellery at the site as well as a single unique inscription identifying a goldsmith shop.

=== Medieval ===
The name Malton derives from either the Old English mæðeltūn meaning 'settlement where council meetings were held' or from a combination of the Old Norse meðal and the Old English tūn meaning 'middle settlement'.

There was some form of settlement in New Malton by 1138 and Old Malton was probably also founded in the 1100s; a Gilbertine monastery was built between 1147 and 1154 in Old Malton, and the monastic church was probably built around 1180. The first reference to a market in New Malton was in a 1283 document, indicating that craftsmen and others, such as butchers, were selling their wares.

Earlier, in the 11th century, a wooden Norman castle, Malton Castle, was built in what is now Castle Garden, on the site of the Roman fort. It was given to Eustace Fitz John, who rebuilt it in stone; he negotiated its surrender to King David I of Scotland in 1138, though it was recaptured later that year. Richard I visited the castle in 1189, and other visitors included Edward II in 1307 and Robert the Bruce in 1322. When Eustace de Vesci (1169–1216) rebelled against King John in 1212, the king ordered the castle slighted. The great house subsequently became ruined.

The castle site was inherited by Lord William Eure (c. 1483–1548) in 1544, when he was also made a baron. (Note: The Eure family had a long and interesting connection with the area – William's son Ralph, born in 1510, defended Scarborough Castle against the Pilgrimage of Grace in 1536 and became Warden of the East Marches. He was also involved in the burning of Edinburgh in 1544. The exploits of this bloody warrior are commemorated in Sir Walter Scott's poem entitled 'Lord Eurie'.) In 1569 Ralph Eure built a new house on the castle site and in 1602, the house was rebuilt in much grander style. This was a spectacular property and it was described by the diarist Sir Henry Slingsby as the rival of many other great houses, including that at Audley End.

The house was subsequently demolished in 1674 and the stones divided between two sisters, Mary (who married into the Palmes family) and Margaret Eure. (The site is now Castle Garden.) They had quarrelled over their inheritance and the demolition was the settlement ordered by Sheriff Henry Marwood. The Old Lodge Hotel is the remaining fragment of the original Jacobean "prodigy house" and its size hints at the grandeur of the complete structure.

=== 18th, 19th and early 20th centuries ===
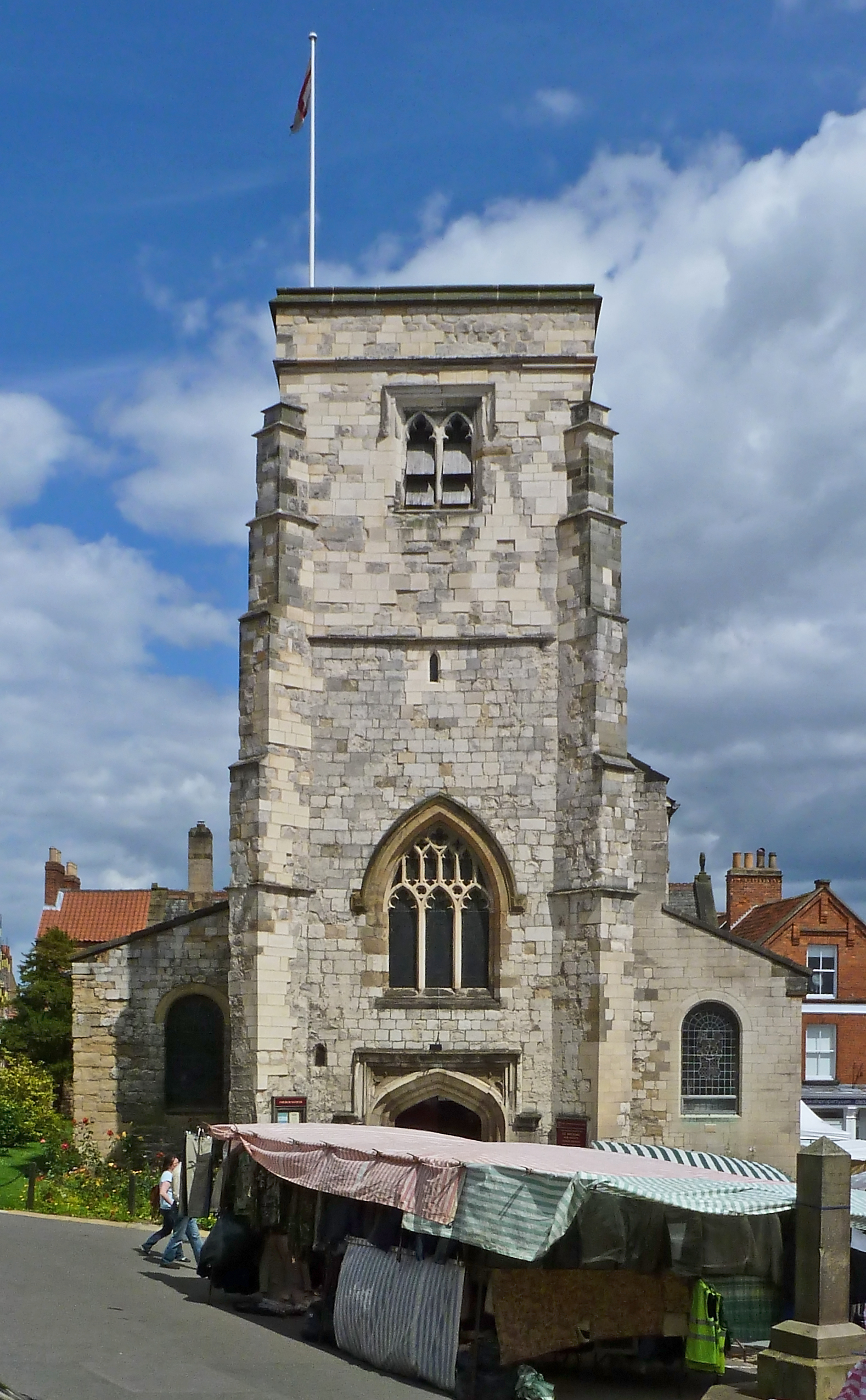
St Michael's, Market Place

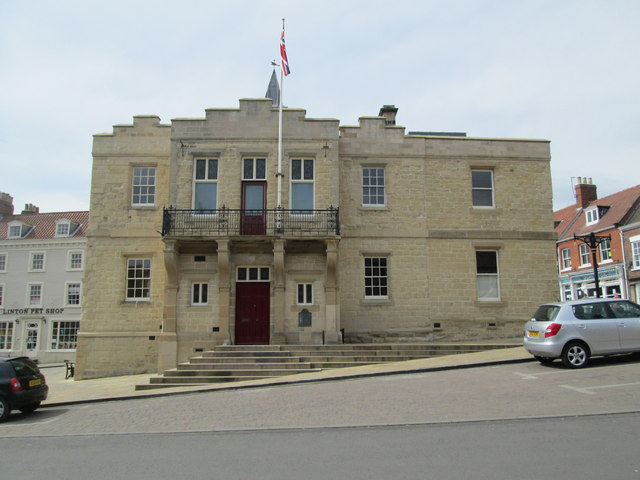
Malton Town Hall

According to contemporary archives, during the 18th century attention was paid to improving the facilities for traders in Malton, in particular for the numerous butchers.

Malton Town Hall was first used as a butter market, butter being the main marketable product for many farmers of the day. The town hall was extended and changed at various intervals over the years.

The town's Shambles, currently opposite Malton Town Hall, used to be located on the north side of St Michael's Church, which still stands in the centre of the Market Place. The Talbot Hotel still standing and renovated, dates back to the early 17th century and may contain remnants of the medieval town wall. It was initially used as a hunting lodge and became an inn in 1740; it was also a coach stop. The property, with its associated buildings in Talbot Yard, is now Grade II listed. In the Victorian era, it was known as Kimberley's Hotel.

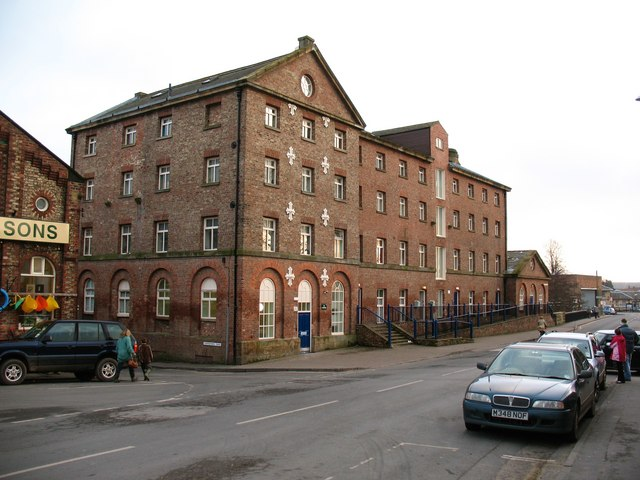
Former flour mills, Railway Street

A sure sign of a town 'up and coming' was the advertisement of a 'light coach, setting out from Leeds to Scarborough returning to Malton to dine.'

In the last year of the 18th century, there was a famine in the area, and a soup kitchen was set up in a brew house in the town. The Earl Fitzwilliam of the time subscribed to a fund, which helped provide 'good strong soup' for the hungry poor.

In 1801 the population of Old and New Malton numbered 3,788. The workhouse contained 15 elderly people and 17 children.

In 1809 Malton's Talbot Hotel was extended and modernised with a third floor being added and new stables being constructed across the road from the hotel.

The town's Assembly Rooms were opened in 1814, a place in which 'polite society' could mingle. An 1833 Gazetteer stated that New Malton did a great deal of trade in coal, corn, butter, etc. There were two churches, four meeting houses for "dissenters", a free school and a national school. A bridge connected this town to Old Malton. Several schools or academies were operating by the 1820s, on a fee basis.

According to the 1840 edition of White's Gazetteer, Malton's "town and suburbs have much improved during the last twenty years, by the erection of houses; and gas works were constructed in 1832." The streets of Malton were lit with gas for the first time on 12 November 1832; the first electric light was lit in 1893, powered by a dynamo, in a single location. By 1867, the Malton Waterworks was supplying residents with water.

By 1835, medical care was being provided at The Dispensary on Saville Street; this was a predecessor of the Malton Cottage Hospital which would not open until August 1905, funded by donations and a subscription. As late as 1841, dental care was provided by barbers; a Mr. Moseley was a prominent "surgeon-dentist".

Newspapers were well established in 1855, when the tax on newspapers was repealed. The Malton Messenger and The Malton & Norton Gazette were both weekly publications.

In 1856, the town was policed by the North Riding, with four men and a superintendent. Thomas Wilson was the Chief Police Officer. The Malton Town Gaol had been opened decades earlier. Work on new police house started in October 1893. By 1881, the Malton Fire Brigade, was operating with a steam engine.

In 1881, the combined population of Old and New Malton was reported as approximately 8,750 persons (contemporary gazetteers give varying figures, some of which may include the neighbouring township of Norton-on-Derwent). Newer industries in New Malton included iron and brass foundries.

The development of the local railway network flourished during the mid-1800s – the York to Scarborough railway opened in 1845 and the Malton and Driffield Junction Railway opened in 1853. The Malton railway station is now Grade II listed (since 1986).

During the early 1900s, electricity was installed in much of the town. Before the Second World War, several buildings were erected, including the Court House, Cottage Hospital and Police Station. The town was bombed during the war.

== Navigation on the River Derwent ==
The navigation capacity on the Derwent was one of the earliest in Britain to be significantly improved around 1725, enabling extensive barge traffic to transport goods and produce.

The navigation continued to compete with the railway, having been extended as far as Yedingham after 1810. The river's use as a highway declined only after it was bought by the railway itself and cheaper coal began to arrive by rail, while river maintenance was deliberately neglected.

== Governance ==
In medieval times, Malton was briefly a parliamentary borough in the 13th century, and again from 1640 to 1885; the borough was sometimes referred to as 'New Malton'. It was represented by two Members of Parliament until 1868, among them the political philosopher Edmund Burke, and by one member from 1868 to 1885.

From 1974 to 2023 it was part of Ryedale District. It is now administered by the unitary North Yorkshire Council.

The current Member of Parliament for Thirsk and Malton (since 2015) is Kevin Hollinrake of the Conservative Party.

== Today ==
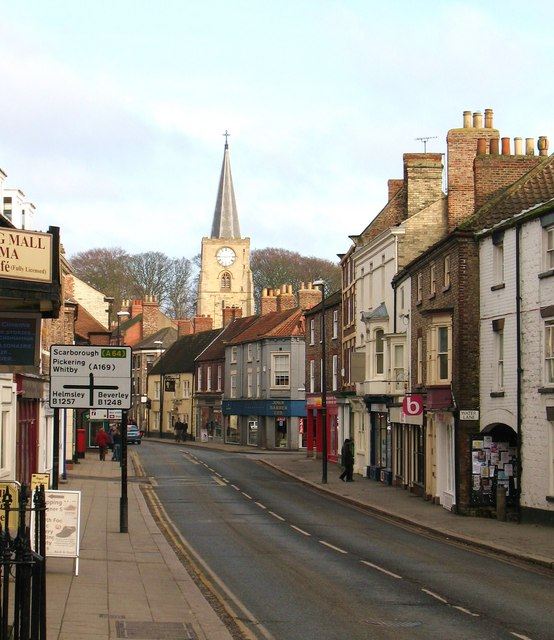
Yorkersgate, one of the main streets in town

The Fitzwilliam family has been important in the history of Malton for centuries, and its descendants, as the Fitzwilliam Malton Estate, own much of the commercial area in and around the town. In 1713 The Hon Thomas Watson-Wentworth (father of the 1st Earl of Malton and Marquess of Rockingham) purchased the Manor of Malton, beginning a long association between the town and the Wentworth, Watson-Wentworth, Wentworth-Fitzwilliam, and Naylor-Leyland families. A book detailing the history since 1713 was published in 2013, written by Norman Maitland, entitled 300 years of continuity and change: families and business in Malton from the 18th century to the present.

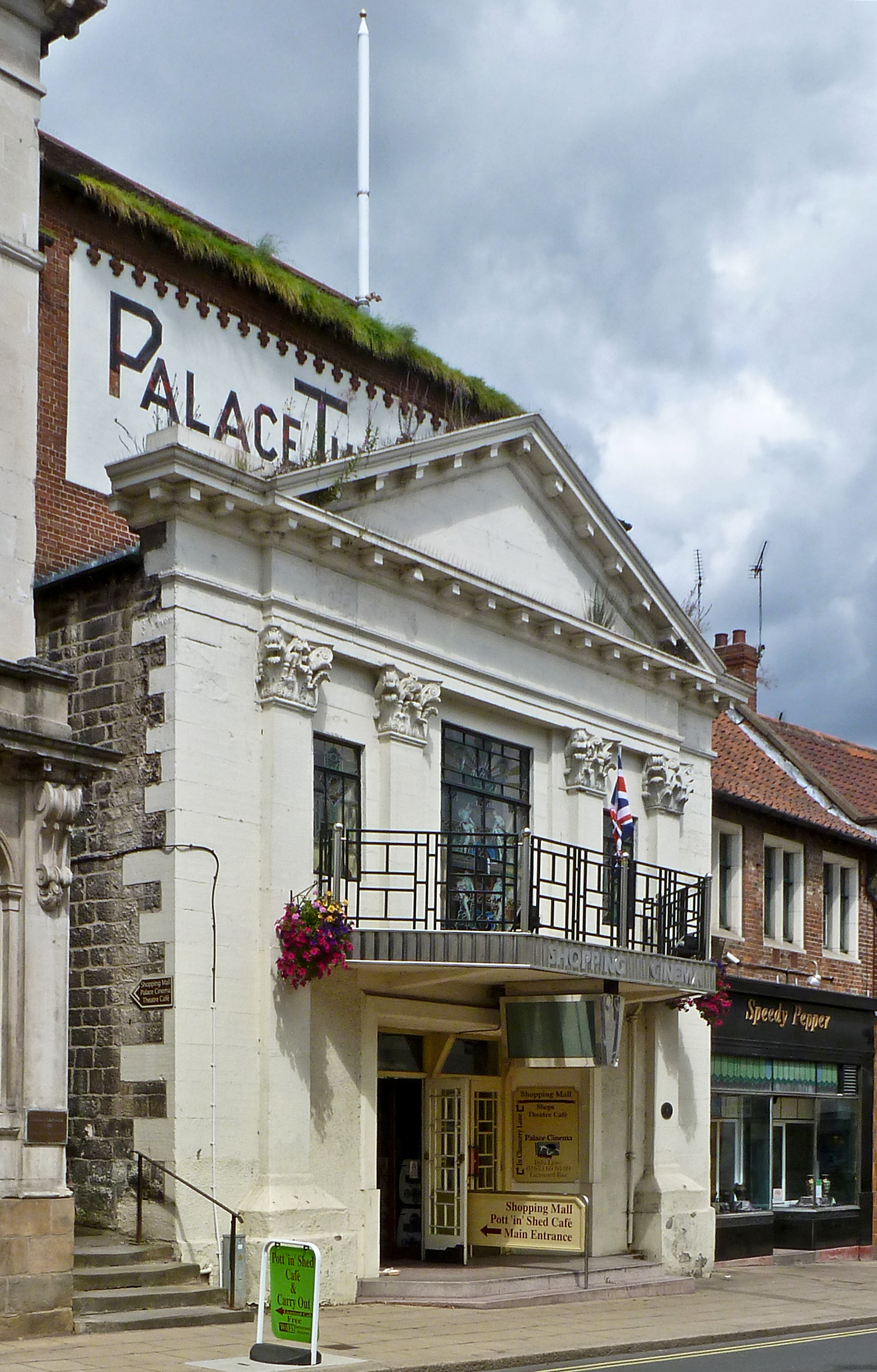
The Palace Cinema, Malton

Attractions in modern Malton include the signposted remains of the Roman fort at 'Orchard Fields', and Malton Priory a Gilbertine priory. Eden Camp, a military themed museum, is located just outside the town. Malton Museum is located at the Subscription Rooms in Yorkersgate. The town has an independent cinema (The Palace Cinema), which also houses a shopping mall, a theatre (The Milton Rooms) and independent retailers, high street shops, cafés, public houses and restaurants. Malton's independent microbrewery, Brass Castle Brewery, hosts an annual spring 'BEERTOWN' festival at the town's Milton Rooms. Brass Castle brew their full range of vegan and gluten-free beers in the centre of Malton, including the 2015 UK Supreme Champion Cask Beer: 'Burnout'. A second microbrewery company in the town is Malton Brewery, which is known for a Yorkshire Pudding Beer produced at Cropton Brewery. Malton Brewery itself is one of Britain's smallest, located in a listed building at Navigation Wharf.

Both towns are known in connection with Charles Dickens, who made regular visits to the area to see his friend Charles Smithson. Dickens did not write A Christmas Carol while staying in Malton, but was inspired by some of the buildings in the town. There have been recent revivals of Dickens-related festivals. Malton and the neighbouring village of Old Malton provide the settings for the collection of stories told in the book, All is Bright – A Yorkshire Lad's Christmas by Dave Preston.

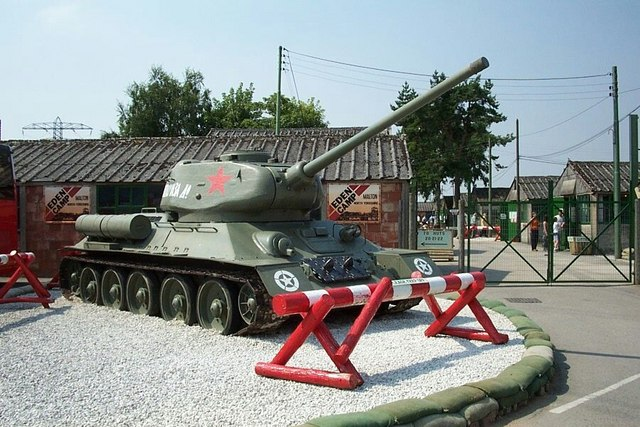
Eden Camp Museum

In September 2013 Ryedale District Council issued their Local Plan Strategy. The current Local Plan, produced in September 2013, supports Malton (together with Norton, its twin town on the south side of the River Derwent) as Ryedale District's Principal Town. The Local Plan sees Malton's historic town centre as the thriving and attractive cultural and economic heart of the area. During the Plan's period until 2027, Malton and Norton will be the focus for the majority of any new development and growth including new housing, employment and retail units. The Local Plan establishes a level of housebuilding of 200 units per annum for the whole district in order to deliver at least 3,000 (net) new homes over the period of 2012 to 2027. Approximately 50% of the planned supply – around 1,500 new homes – will be directed to Malton and Norton. A further plan for employment land is proposed for Malton. Of the 37 hectares of employment land required to meet the needs of the district until 2027, approximately 80% will be allocated towards Malton and Norton. For retail development the plan reflects Malton's role as the main retail centre serving Ryedale, and will direct most new retail and other town centre uses to Malton in order to support and promote its role as a shopping, employment, leisure and cultural centre for Ryedale.

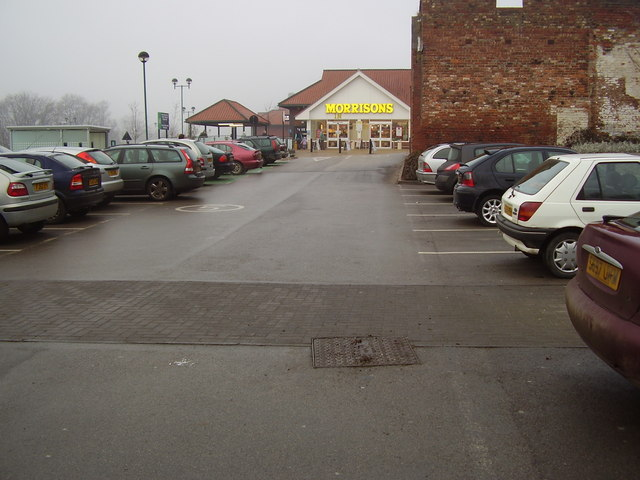
Morrisons Supermarket

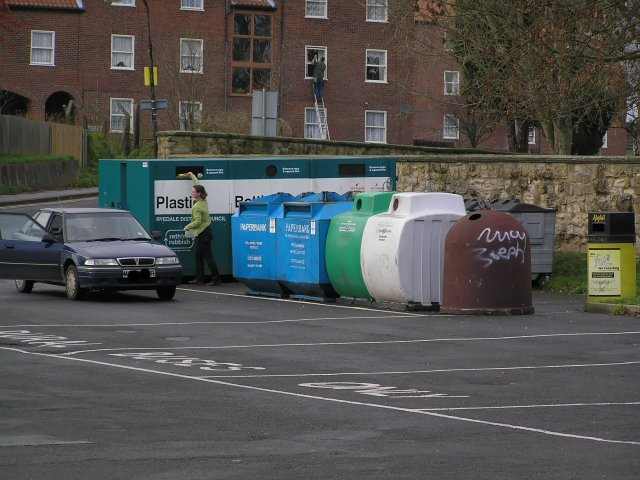
Malton Community Recycling bins

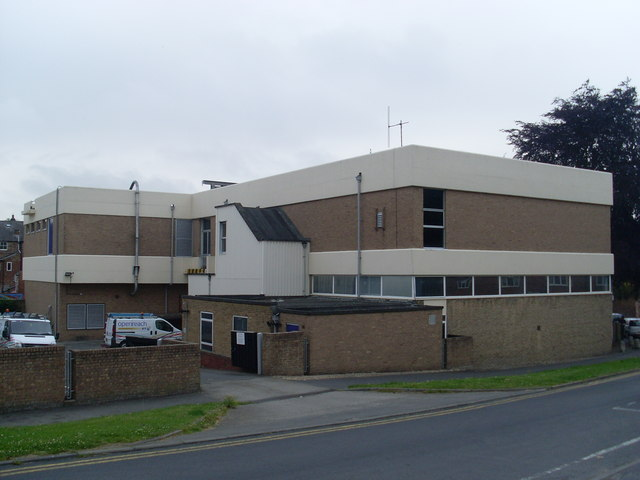
Malton Telephone Exchange

Malton holds a market every Saturday, and a farmers' market on the second Saturday of each month. The town has a war memorial and several historical churches (Norton-on-Derwent also holds large church buildings). The town is served by Malton railway station. The livestock market, currently situated on the edge of the town centre will be relocated to a site close to Eden Camp once construction work there is complete.

Malton is the middle-ground between York, Pickering (access to the North York Moors and also a terminus of the North Yorkshire Moors Railway), Scarborough, Filey and Whitby. The route of the White Rose Way, a long-distance walk from Leeds to Scarborough, North Yorkshire also passes through Malton.

Malton and Norton are significant for their horse racing connections and have a number of training stables in the vicinity. The Malton Stables Open Day, held in August 2013, showcased 19 trainer stables. Writer Norman Maitland describes the history of horse racing as "being in the blood in this part of Yorkshire for generations..." with meetings being advertised as early as 1692. The Malton Races were run on Langton Wolds, between 1692 and 1861.

Malton is also used to flooding, with notable floods in 1999, 2000, 2007, 2012, 2015, 2016, 2017, 2018 and 2021.

=== We Love Malton ===
The 'We Love Malton' campaign was launched in March 2009. It aimed to reinvigorate the town of Malton as a 'Food Lovers' destination and raise its appeal with both residents and tourists. A harvest festival was also scheduled. By 2017, the town was considered to be the food capital of Yorkshire. Malton is also well located for visiting the North York Moors and the seaside towns of Whitby, Scarborough and Bridlington.

=== Malton Community Interest Company (Malton CIC) ===
Formed in 2011, Malton CIC benefits the area with donations to local organisations, including Ryedale Book Festival. The CIC also finances and provides two hours free parking in Malton's Market Place. It helps organise and fund Malton Food Lovers Festival and the Malton Monthly Food Markets.

== Religion ==
Malton's churches include St Michael Anglican church and St Leonard & Mary Catholic church. Preliminary work has commenced at the Methodist Wesley Centre which aims to repurpose the centre for use as a community hub alongside its purpose as a place of worship.

== Education ==
There are two secondary schools in Malton and Norton, Malton School, founded in 1547, and Norton College. Primary education is provided by St Mary's RC Primary School, Norton Community Primary School and Malton Community Primary School. The nearest independent school is Terrington Hall Prep School.

== Media ==
Local news and television programmes are provided by BBC Yorkshire and ITV Yorkshire. Television signals are received from either the Emley Moor or Oliver's Mount TV transmitters. BBC North East and Cumbria and ITV Tyne Tees is also received in the town from the Bilsdale TV transmitter.

Malton's local radio stations are BBC Radio York, Greatest Hits Radio Yorkshire, Capital Yorkshire and Coast & County Radio.

The local newspapers that cover the town are The York Press and Gazette & Herald.

== Climate ==
As with the rest of the British Isles and Yorkshire, Malton possesses a maritime climate with cool summers and mild winters. The nearest Met Office weather station for which records are available is High Mowthorpe, about 6 miles (10 km) east of the town centre. Due to its lower elevation, the town centre is likely to be marginally warmer than High Mowthorpe throughout the year.

Climate data for High Mowthorpe 175m asl, 1991–2020, Extremes 1960–
Month	Jan	Feb	Mar	Apr	May	Jun	Jul	Aug	Sep	Oct	Nov	Dec	Year
Record high °C (°F)	13.3 (55.9)	15.0 (59.0)	20.6 (69.1)	21.7 (71.1)	25.0 (77.0)	28.4 (83.1)	28.5 (83.3)	33.2 (91.8)	26.4 (79.5)	21.7 (71.1)	16.2 (61.2)	14.5 (58.1)	33.2 (91.8)
Mean daily maximum °C (°F)	5.8 (42.4)	6.4 (43.5)	8.7 (47.7)	11.4 (52.5)	14.5 (58.1)	17.3 (63.1)	19.9 (67.8)	20.0 (68.0)	16.8 (62.2)	12.7 (54.9)	8.7 (47.7)	6.2 (43.2)	12.4 (54.3)
Daily mean °C (°F)	3.4 (38.1)	3.7 (38.7)	5.4 (41.7)	7.6 (45.7)	10.4 (50.7)	13.1 (55.6)	15.5 (59.9)	15.6 (60.1)	13.2 (55.8)	9.8 (49.6)	6.2 (43.2)	3.7 (38.7)	9.0 (48.2)
Mean daily minimum °C (°F)	1.0 (33.8)	1.0 (33.8)	2.1 (35.8)	3.8 (38.8)	6.3 (43.3)	8.9 (48.0)	11.0 (51.8)	11.3 (52.3)	9.6 (49.3)	6.9 (44.4)	3.7 (38.7)	1.3 (34.3)	5.6 (42.0)
Record low °C (°F)	−10.2 (13.6)	−10.9 (12.4)	−8.9 (16.0)	−5.7 (21.7)	−2.3 (27.9)	−0.6 (30.9)	3.9 (39.0)	3.9 (39.0)	0.6 (33.1)	−2.8 (27.0)	−7.5 (18.5)	−14.6 (5.7)	−14.6 (5.7)
Average precipitation mm (inches)	64.8 (2.55)	55.5 (2.19)	48.9 (1.93)	55.4 (2.18)	51.4 (2.02)	75.0 (2.95)	63.7 (2.51)	71.9 (2.83)	62.3 (2.45)	72.5 (2.85)	79.3 (3.12)	70.6 (2.78)	771.2 (30.36)
Average precipitation days (≥ 1.0 mm)	12.6	11.7	9.8	9.5	9.4	10.6	10.6	11.1	9.7	12.2	13.7	12.6	133.6
Mean monthly sunshine hours	54.8	81.2	120.9	161.1	208.5	188.4	198.0	181.2	141.6	104.3	65.9	51.1	1,557
Source 1: Met Office
Source 2: Royal Netherlands Meteorological Institute

== Transport ==
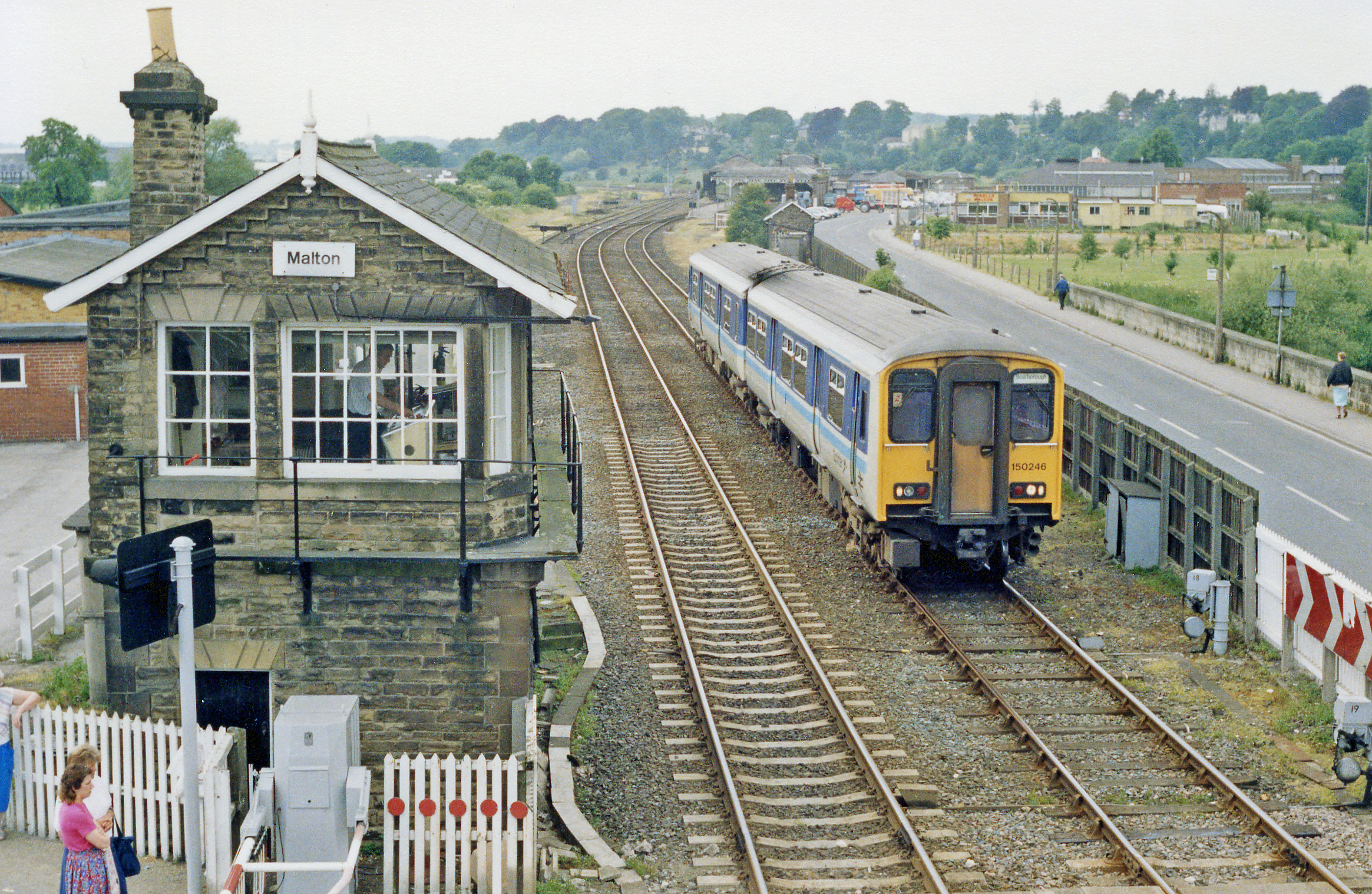
A diesel multiple unit passing Malton signalbox in 1988, approaching the railway station

Malton railway station is a stop on the York-Scarborough line. TransPennine Express operates hourly trains in each direction between Scarborough and York; alternate services continue on to Leeds and Manchester Piccadilly. With a change at York, it is possible to reach London Kings Cross in around two and a half hours; a journey to Leeds takes around 50 minutes.

There are long-term aspirations to reopen the former railway between Malton and Pickering; this would provide services to Whitby over a distance of 32 miles (51 km).

Malton is bypassed by the A64, which runs between Leeds, York and Scarborough; there is a junction at the A169 to Pickering and Whitby.

Malton's main bus routes are run by Yorkshire Coastliner, a division of the Transdev Blazefield bus group; services link the town with Leeds, York, Whitby and Scarborough. Ryedale Community Transport operate regular services to Pickering, Castle Howard and Hovingham.

== Notable people from Malton ==
- George Baker - cricketer
- Robert Bower – Conservative politician
- Alan Brown – racing driver
- Edmund Carter – cricketer
- Adrian Dalby – cricketer
- Keane Duncan – Conservative politician
- Brian Dutton – English professional football coach and former player
- Simon Dyson – golfer
- Terry Dyson – professional football player
- Tim Easterby – racehorse trainer. Easterby's training stables Habton Grange are near Malton
- Edgar Firth – cricketer
- Scott Garnham – actor
- Charles Hall – New Zealand politician
- Lucy Hall (2003– ) – Olympic trap shooter was born and brought up here.
- Francis Jackson – organist and composer
- Richard Leonard MSP – Leader of the Scottish Labour Party (2017–2021)
- James Martin – TV chef
- Martyn Moore – writer and film-maker
- Leo Sheffield – singer and actor
- Marcus Skeet – runner who became the youngest person to run the length of the Great Britain in 2025
- Jon Sleightholme – former England Rugby Union international
- John Smith – banker and vegetarianism activist
- Ryan Swain – multi-award winning presenter, actor and motivational speaker, born in Malton.
- Alfred Tinsley – cricketer
- Bridgit Forsyth – Actress
- Edith Woodford-Grimes – English Wiccan
- Peter Easterby – Horse trainer
- Henry Tinsley – Cricketer
- James Watson – Radical publisher

== See also ==
- Listed buildings in Malton, North Yorkshire (central area)
- Listed buildings in Malton, North Yorkshire (outer areas)
