= Thormanby =

Village and civil parish in North Yorkshire, England

Coordinates: 54°10′02″N 1°14′47″W

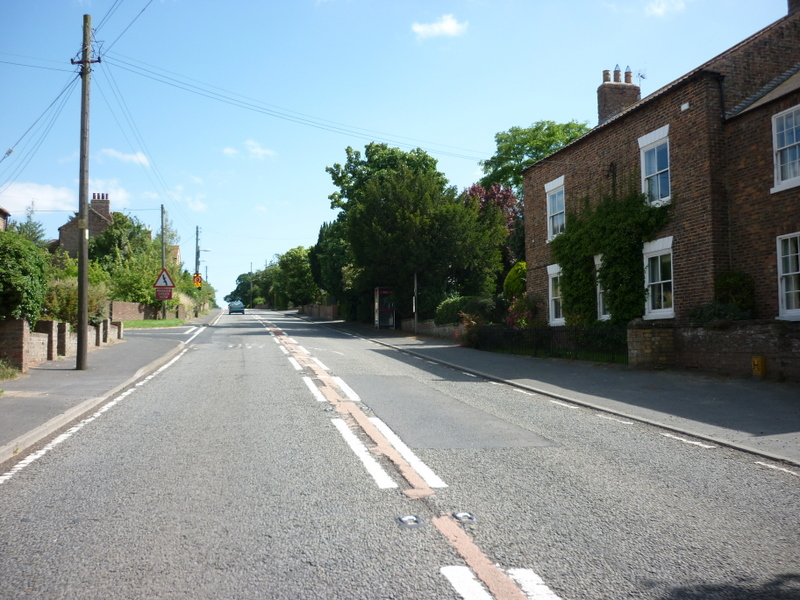
- A19 at Thormanby

- Location within North Yorkshire
- Population: 138 (2011 census)
- OS grid reference: SE492749
  - London: 193 mi (311 km) south
- Unitary authority: North Yorkshire
- Ceremonial county: North Yorkshire
- Region: Yorkshire and the Humber
- Country: England
- Sovereign state: United Kingdom
- Post town: York
- Postcode district: YO61
- Police: North Yorkshire
- Fire: North Yorkshire
- Ambulance: Yorkshire
- UK Parliament: Thirsk and Malton

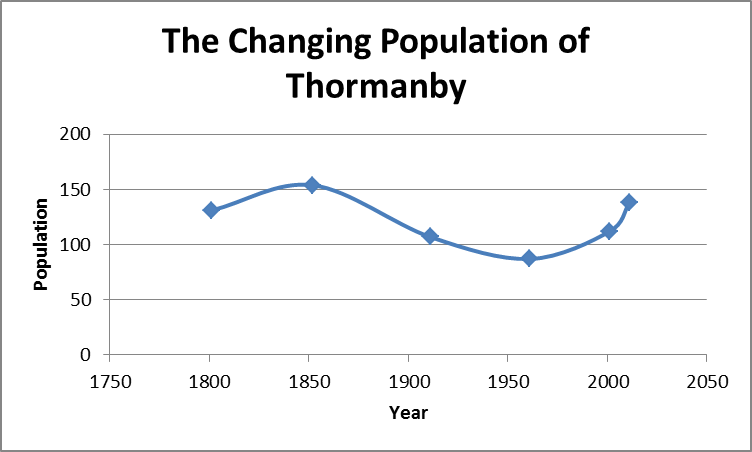
The changing population of Thormanby over time

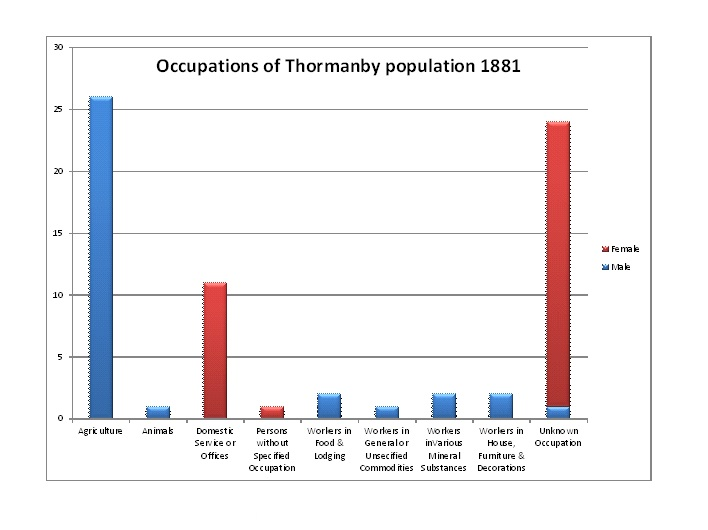
Occupation history 1881

Thormanby is a village and civil parish in the county of North Yorkshire, England. It lies on the A19 approximately halfway between Easingwold and Thirsk and about 14 miles (23 km) south east of the county town of Northallerton.

== History ==
Thormanby is derived from the Old Norse personal name of Thormothr / Þórmóðr (Tormod in modern Norwegian) and the suffix bi meaning "Thormothr's farm". The name Thormothr means "Thor's gift" (i.e. "mind" and "courage").

The village is mentioned twice in the Domesday Book of 1086 as "Tormozbi" in the Yarlestre wapentake. Before the Norman Conquest most of the land in the parish belonged to the manor of Earl Morcar, with a small areas owned by Arkil and Gamel. Following Domesday the manor passed to the Crown and, along with the smaller areas of land, was granted to Robert Malet. It eventually passed into the Nevill family, lords of the manors of Sheriff Hutton and Raskelf, who held it until the 15th century. It passed through several other families during the next 250 years until it came down to the Dawnay family in 1721. From that date it followed the descent of the manor of Sessay. Most of the land in the village was owned by the Viscounts Downe of Wykeham, but much of this was sold in 1918 with the disposing of the Sessay Estate.

William Page in his A History of the County of York North Riding states: "According to tradition there was once a castle here. It is also said that in the rebellion of the Earl of Northumberland in 1569, the royal forces encamped on Thormanby Carr on their way to Maiden Bower near Topcliffe."

In 1870–72, John Marius Wilson's Imperial Gazetteer of England and Wales described Thormanby as:

a parish in Easingwold district, N. R. Yorkshire; 1¾ mile SW of Husthwaite Gate railway station, and 4¼ NNW of Easingwold. It has a post-office under Easingwold. Acres, 958. Real property, £1,042. Pop., 147. Houses, 24. The living is a rectory in the diocese of York. Value, £216.* Patron, alternately Viscount Downe and Sir G. Cayley, Bart. The church is good. Charities, £6.

There were three inns throughout the 17th century and 18th century, but only the Black Bull Inn public house remained until recent years. In 1999 the landlord of the Black Bull, Robert Medd, intended to close the pub, saying "the pub is sometimes more like a morgue," and "sells just 16 pints a day." Residents opposed his application to convert the pub through a belief that the village needed a "focal point".

== Governance ==
The village lies within the Thirsk and Malton UK Parliament constituency. From 1974 to 2023 it was part of the Hambleton District, it is now administered by the unitary North Yorkshire Council.

== Geography ==
The parish contains 1,002 acres (4.1 km^{2}), of which 454 are arable land and 383 grass. The nearest settlements are the hamlet of Birdforth 0.7 miles (1.1 km) to the north and the villages of Carlton Husthwaite, Hutton Sessay and Husthwaite, which are all within a radius of 1.6 miles (2.6 km). The village lies at and elevation between 148 feet (45 m) and 180 feet (55 m) and is the highest point within the parish. The nearest major city is York, 16 miles (26 km) to the south-east. The Thirsk and Malton branch of the North Eastern Railway passed through the parish until its complete closure in 1966 but there was no station here. Much of the former line is still visible but lies on private land.

=== Topography ===
The surface elevation is relatively consistent, varying in height from only 103 feet (31.4 m) to 175 feet (53.3 m) above the Ordnance Survey data. In the south there is an area of low-lying carr (landform) – Sun Beck, Birdforth Beck and Ings Beck, which are part of the tributary system of the River Swale, drain the land and separate Thormanby from Sessay, Birdforth and Carlton Husthwaite respectively.

== Demography ==
The first United Kingdom Census in 1801 recorded the population as 131. The highest recorded population in UK census returns was in 1852 when there were 154 people. By the time of the 1961 UK census, the population had fallen to 87. The 2001 UK census recorded the population as 112 of which 52.7% were male and 47.3% were female. Of those, 88.4% stated their religion as Christian, with the rest not stating a religion. The ethnicity of the parish was virtually 100% white British. There were 44 dwellings in the Parish. The 2011 UK census recorded the population as 138, an increase of 39.4% on the previous figures, of which 51.4% were male and 48.6% were female. Of those, 70.3% stated their religion as Christian, with the rest not stating a religion. The ethnicity of the Parish was virtually 100% white British.

=== Occupation history ===
The stacked column chart represents a simplified version of the 1881 occupational data, using the 24 'Orders' used in the published reports for 1881, plus an 'Unknown' category. Many of these categories combine 'Workers and Dealers' in different commodities, so it is impossible to distinguish workers in manufacturing and services. The graph shows that women had no significant occupation apart from domestic service, showing at approximately 31.5% of females. The most common occupation for males in the parish was agriculture, with approximately 74.2% of males being employed in this sector.

== Landmarks ==
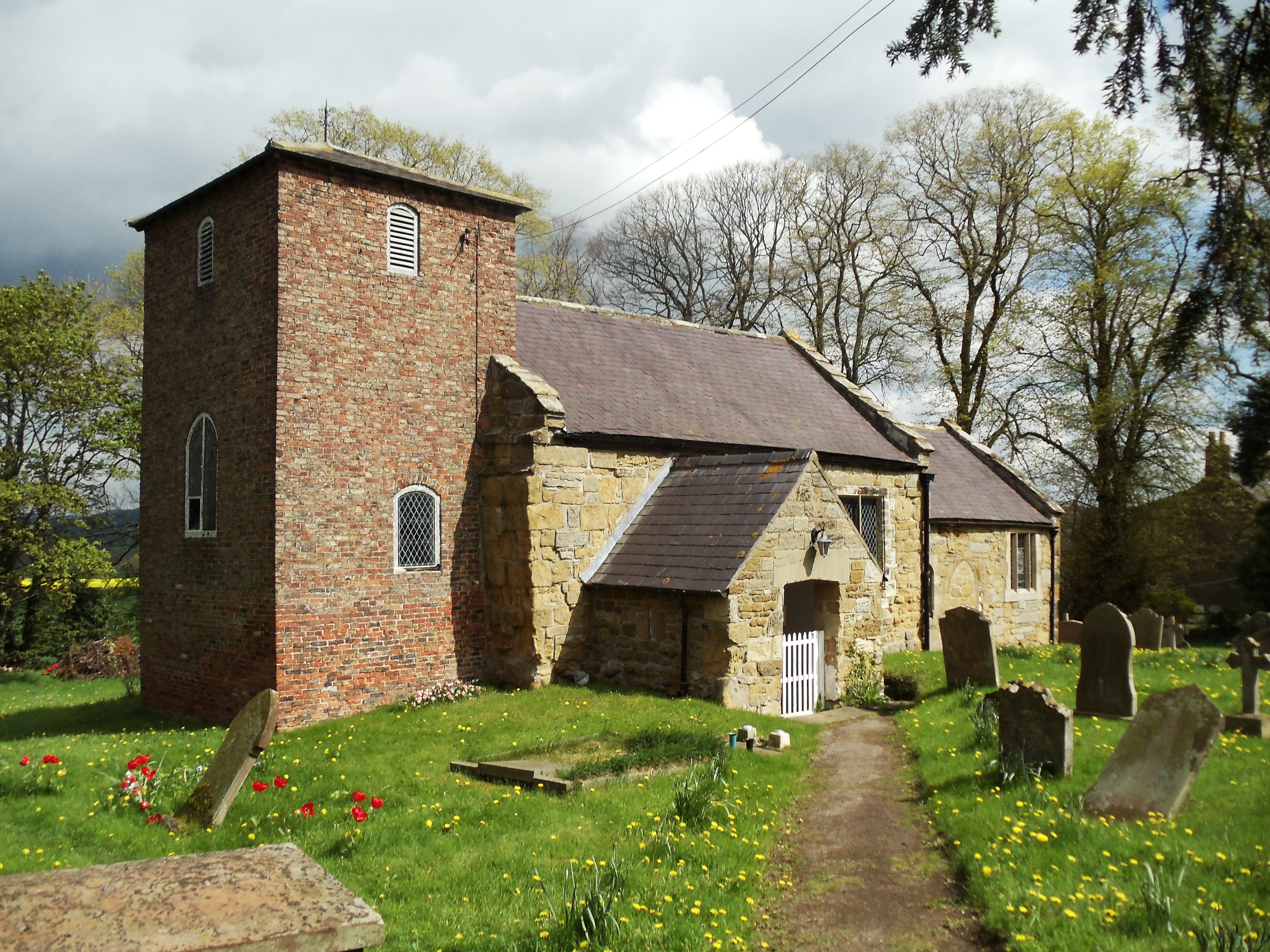
St Mary Magdalene Church, Thormanby

St Mary Magdalene's Church, Thormanby is a Grade II* listed building. It was built in the 12th century and has been subject to frequent changes up to 1955. The church stands a short distance east of the village on Church Lane. The village rectory is just south-west from the church. The Old Rectory is a Grade II Listed 18th-century Georgian residence, built in 1737 with a later addition of a schoolroom in 1786, and further alterations in 1837.

Near the Rectory is a small redundant Wesleyan chapel, built in 1875, which has now been converted into a private house. West of the village, on Birdforth Beck, is Thormanby Mill. A red-brick 19th-century barn at Thormanby Mill is Grade II listed. At the north of the village, on the A19 near Birdforth Bridge, stands a Grade II-listed late 19th-century triangular cast iron mile post.

== Notable people ==
Thomas Whytehead (1815–1843), was a Thormanby-born missionary and poet. He was the fourth son of Henry Robert Whytehead, curate of Thormanby.

Harry Pasley Higginson (1838-1900) was born in Thormanby. He was the son of Revd John (1811–1895) and Mary Maria Hester Higginson (1815–1893). Higginson, who trained in Manchester, was involved in the discovery of dodo bones on Mauritius in 1865. He eventually settled in New Zealand where he became a prominent railway engineer and is commemorated in stained glass at the Wellington Cathedral of St. Paul, Wellington, New Zealand.

== See also ==
- Listed buildings in Thormanby
