= St Mary's Church, Carlton Husthwaite =

Anglican church in Carlton Husthwaite, North Yorkshire, England

Coordinates: 54°11′02″N 1°14′09″W

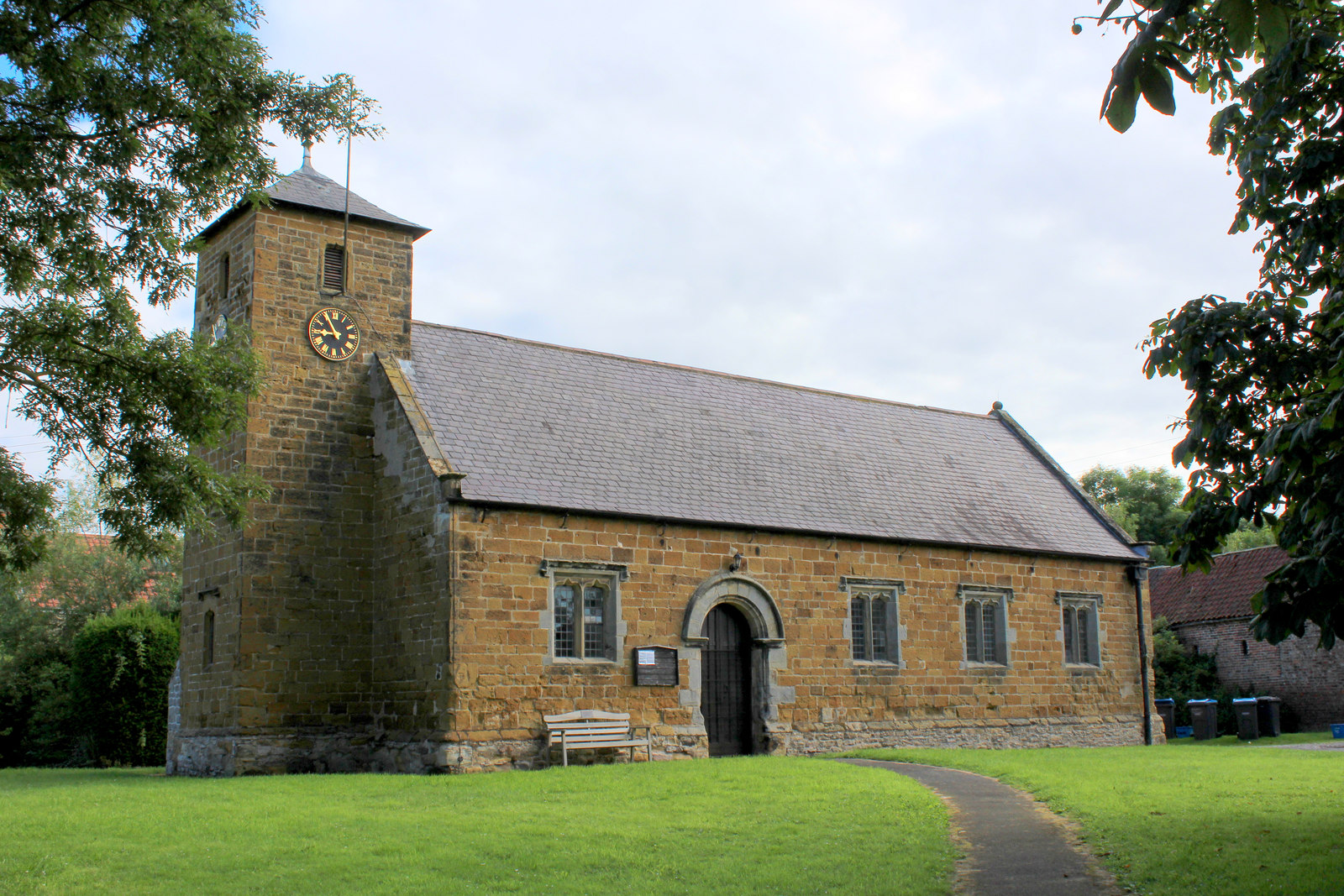
The building, in 2016

St Mary's Church is an Anglican church in Carlton Husthwaite, a village in North Yorkshire, in England.

The building was constructed as a chapel of ease to St Nicholas' Church, Husthwaite, and was probably completed in 1677. A new east window was inserted in the 18th century, and in the 19th century a small heating chamber was added. The building was restored in 1885, and it was Grade II* listed in 1960.

The church is built of sandstone with gritstone dressings and a Welsh slate roof. It consists of a nave and a chancel in one unit, and a west tower. The tower has three stages, a single-light west window with a hood mould, clock faces, single-light bell openings with chamfered surrounds and ogee heads, and a pyramidal roof with a weathervane. The doorway has a round-arched head with impost capitals, a moulded arris, and a hood mould. The windows on the side of the church have two ogee-headed lights and hood moulds, and the east window has three lights, the middle one taller, in a segmental-arched opening with imposts, a keystone and a hood mould.

Inside, many of the furnishings are 17th century, including stalls and benches, a reading desk inscribed "PRAISE THE LORD O IERVSALEM", the pulpit and its tester, which is inscribed "FEED MY LAMBES" and "1678". There are two bells, made by S. Smith of York, and dated 1677. There is also a painted coat of arms of William and Mary, and an octagonal font from the early 20th century.

== See also ==
- Grade II* listed churches in North Yorkshire (district)
- Listed buildings in Carlton Husthwaite
