= Baxby Manor =

Manor house in Husthwaite, North Yorkshire, England

Coordinates: 54°10′12″N 1°13′00″W

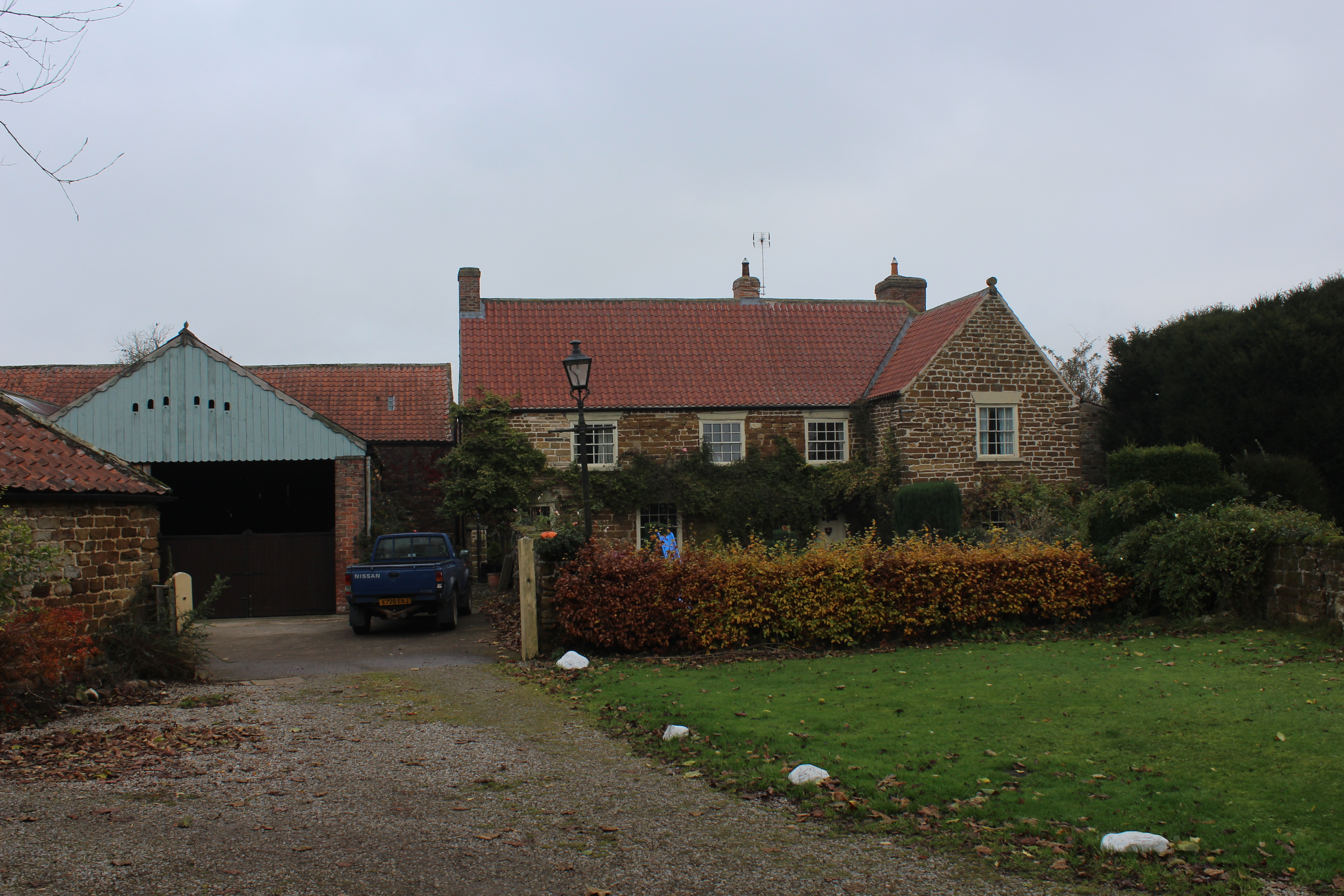
The building, in 2018

Baxby Manor is a historic building in Husthwaite, a village in North Yorkshire, in England.

The core of the manor house was built in about 1300. A chimney was inserted and a wing on the right was added in about 1600. The outer walls were encased in stone in the 18th century. The house was grade II listed in 1980. The building has recently served as a farmhouse. From the mid 1980s, part of the grounds were used as an unlicensed airfield.

The building has a timber framed core encased in brown sandstone, and it has a pantile roof. At the rear, brickwork covers a base cruck, something found elsewhere in northern England only at Canons Garth in Helmsley. The house has two storeys, a main range of three bays, and a gabled cross-wing on the right. On the front is a doorway, and at the rear is a timber porch. Most of the windows are sashes, some horizontally-sliding, and there is a blocked mullioned window. Inside, there is exposed timber framing; 17th-century panelling; a former kitchen with a large fireplace and bread oven; and a huge fireplace in the dining room, which is a subdivision of the former hall.

== See also ==
- Listed buildings in Husthwaite
