= Sessay =

Village and civil parish in North Yorkshire, England

Coordinates: 54°10′21″N 1°18′11″W

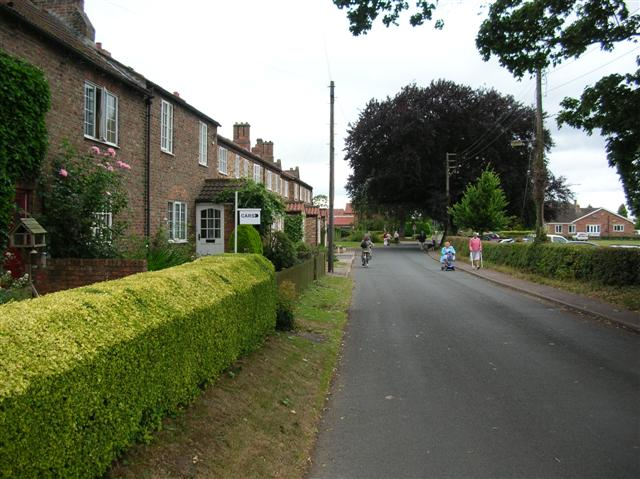
- Sessay, North Yorkshire

- Location within North Yorkshire
- Population: 320
- OS grid reference: SE455756
- Civil parish: Sessay
- Unitary authority: North Yorkshire
- Ceremonial county: North Yorkshire
- Region: Yorkshire and the Humber
- Country: England
- Sovereign state: United Kingdom
- Post town: YORK
- Postcode district: YO7
- Police: North Yorkshire
- Fire: North Yorkshire
- Ambulance: Yorkshire
- UK Parliament: Thirsk and Malton

Sessay is a small linear village and civil parish in North Yorkshire, England. It is situated approximately 4 miles (6 km) south-east from Thirsk, and 2 miles (3 km) west from the A19 road close to the East Coast Main Line.

The civil parish also includes the village of Little Sessay, where the parish church and school are located. In 2013 the population of the civil parish was estimated at 320. The 2001 UK Census recorded the population as 311 of which 266 were over sixteen years old. There were 130 dwellings of which 90 were detached.

== History ==
The village is mentioned in the Domesday Book as "Sezai" in the wapentake of Gerlestre (from the mid-12th century known as Birdforth). It later became a detached part of the wapentake of Allertonshire. At the time of the Norman invasion, the manor was the possession of the Bishop of Durham and St Cuthbert's Church, Durham. The manor became a Mesne lordship and was held after the Norman invasion first by the Percy family and then by the Darrell family from the end of the 12th century to the late 15th century. When the family line of succession ended, it passed by marriage to the Dawnay family in 1525. One descendant, John Dawnay was made Viscount Downe in 1680. The family still hold the manor.

A railway station was opened at Sessay by the Great North of England Railway in 1841. It closed in 1958.

The toponymy is a combination of the Old English word secg meaning sedge and the Anglian word ēg meaning island or dry ground surrounded by marsh. Therefore, it is literally Sedge island.

According to legend, Sessay was once the home of a giant which was slain by a knight named Sir Guy Dawnay.

== Governance ==
The village is within the Thirsk and Malton UK Parliament constituency. From 1974 to 2023 it was part of the Hambleton District. It is now administered by the unitary North Yorkshire Council.

== Geography ==
The village lies immediately to the east of the East Coast Main Line. The nearest settlements are Hutton Sessay 1.1 miles (1.8 km) to the north-east and Dalton 1.7 miles (2.7 km) to the north-west. Birdforth Beck runs to the south of the village on its way to join the nearby River Swale.

The Ordnance Survey have suggested that a field near Sessay may be the geographical centre of Yorkshire, although there are other claimants to this title.

== Amenities ==
The school at Little Sessay, Sessay CE Primary, is within the catchment area of Thirsk School for secondary education. The school was built in 1848 by William Butterfield for Viscount Downe. It has undergone three enlargements and is a Grade II listed building.

There is a Bowls Club and a Cricket Club in the village. The Cricket Club was founded in 1850 and competes in the York Senior League. In September 2010 the club won the National Village Cup at Lord's, repeating its success in September 2016.

== Religion ==
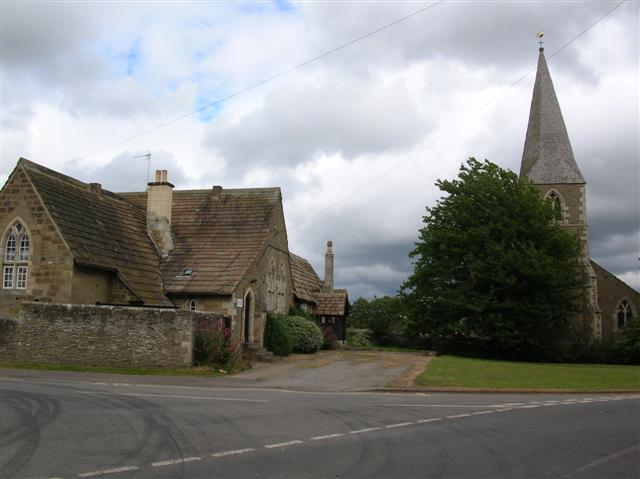
Church and School, Sessay

St Cuthbert's Church, Sessay is a Grade II* listed building, rebuilt by architect William Butterfield in 1847-48 for William Dawnay, 7th Viscount Downe on the site of the original.

In the church there are three funeral brasses in the chancel to members of the Kitchingman family, and one to Mrs. Smelt. Another is that of Master Thomas Magnus on which he is depicted in his priestly robes. At the time of the Dissolution of religious houses he was master of St Leonard's Hospital, York, and was subsequently appointed to the rectory of Sessay, where he died, in 1550, and was buried in the chancel."

== See also ==
- Listed buildings in Sessay
