= Listed buildings in Husthwaite =

Husthwaite is a civil parish in the county of North Yorkshire, England. It contains ten listed buildings that are recorded in the National Heritage List for England. Of these, one is listed at Grade II*, the middle of the three grades, and the others are at Grade II, the lowest grade. The parish contains the village of Husthwaite and the surrounding countryside. Most of the listed buildings are houses and cottages, and the others include a church, a chest tomb in the churchyard, a farmhouse and a farm building.

== Key ==
Grade	Criteria
II*	Particularly important buildings of more than special interest
II	Buildings of national importance and special interest

== Buildings ==
Name and location	Photograph	Date	Notes	Grade
St Nicholas' Church; 54.16925°N 1.20755°W		12th century	The church has been altered and extended through the centuries. It is in sandstone with lead roofs, and consists of a nave, a south porch, a chancel and a west tower. The tower has three stages, a plinth, diagonal buttresses, a three-light west window with a four-centred arch, a string course, two-light bell openings, and a weathervane on the roof. The porch is gabled, and has a triangular-headed doorway with a hood mould. The inner doorway is round-arched with three orders, and spiral capitals and shafts.	II*
Baxby Manor; 54.16993°N 1.21660°W		c. 1300	The farmhouse has a timber framed core, it was encased in brown sandstone in the 18th century, and it has a pantile roof. There are two storeys, a main range of three bays, and a gabled cross-wing on the right. On the front is a doorway, and at the rear is a timber porch. Most of the windows are sashes, some horizontally-sliding, and there is a blocked mullioned window. Inside, there is exposed timber framing.	II
Black Bull Cottage; 54.16876°N 1.20680°W		Mid 16th century (probable)	An inn and a cottage, extended later, and subsequently combined into a house. It has pantile roofs, two storeys and a rear outshut. The older part on the left has two bays, the upper storey is in close studded timber framing, and the rest is in brick. It contains a doorway and casement windows. The later part has two bays, and casement windows, those in the ground floor with wedge lintels. Inside, there is exposed timber framing.	II
Highthorne; 54.16296°N 1.21416°W	—	16th century	A manor house that has been extended, in brown and grey sandstone on a chamfered plinth, with tile roofs, shaped kneelers, stone coping and a finial. There is a main range of two storeys and three bays, and a cross-wing with two storeys and a loft, which has been extended. The main range has a stepped buttress to the left, and a moulded cornice. It contains a segmental-arched doorway with a chamfered surround, and mullioned and transomed windows, those on the ground floor with hood moulds. In the cross-wing are mullioned and transomed windows, and an oval window set in diamond-shaped panel.	II
Laburnum Cottage; 54.16947°N 1.20417°W		Early to mid 18th century	The house is in brown sandstone, with an eaves band, and a pantile roof with moulded stone coping and shaped kneelers. There are two storeys and an attic, and two bays. To the left is a porch, and the windows on the front are horizontally-sliding sashes, those in the ground floor with lintels and keystones.	II
The White House; 54.16873°N 1.20787°W	—	Mid 18th century	The house, which was extended to the left in the 20th century, is in sandstone, whitewashed at the rear, with a pantile roof, shaped kneelers and stone coping. There are two storeys and an attic and three bays, and the extension has two storeys and two bays. In the centre of the original part is a doorway, the windows are sashes, at the rear is a staircase window, and there are two dormers. Inside is an inglenook fireplace.	II
Rose Cottage; 54.16947°N 1.20430°W		Mid to late 18th century (probable)	The cottage is in brown sandstone with a pantile roof. There is a single storey and two bays. To the left is a timber porch, and to the right are two horizontally-sliding sash windows.	II
Farm building northwest of Baxby Manor; 54.17007°N 1.21690°W	—	Late 18th century	A combination farm building in brown sandstone with a pantile roof, hipped on the left. It consists of a barn with two storeys and five bays, and a two-bay cart shed with a granary above. The openings include board doors, slit vents, and a loading door, and there are external steps leading to the granary.	II
Wailes chest tomb 54.16911°N 1.20756°W	—	1796	The chest tomb is in the churchyard of St Nicholas' Church, to the south of the church. It is in sandstone, and has an inscribed moulded lid, On the sides are reeded panels, and at the corners and centres of the long sides are bulbous balusters.	II
Holly Grove House and outbuilding 54.16948°N 1.20341°W	—	1820	The house and the outbuilding to the left are in brick, and have roofs with stone coping and shaped kneelers. The house has two storeys and a loft, and a Westmorland slate roof. In the centre is a doorway with a fanlight, and a pediment on consoles. The windows are sashes with cambered brick arches and keystones. The outbuilding is lower with one storey and a loft, a dog-tooth eaves course, and a pantile roof.	II
