= The Old Hall, Carlton Husthwaite =

Historic building in Carlton Husthwaite, England

Coordinates: 54°11′02″N 1°14′19″W

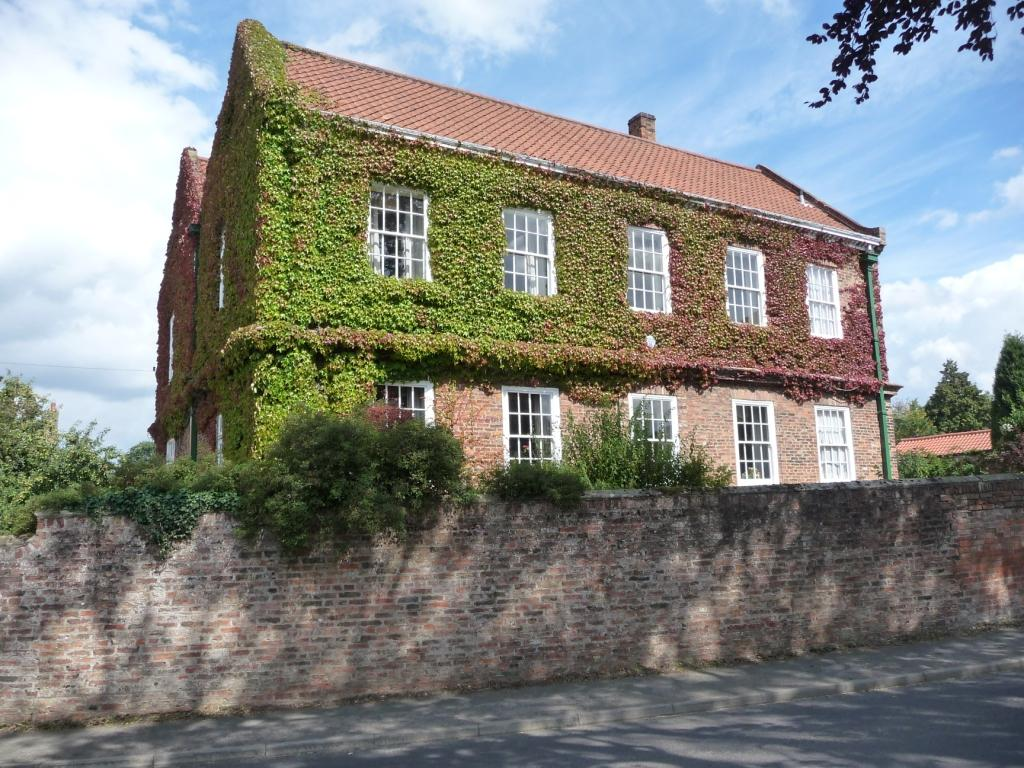
The building, in 2010

The Old Hall is a historic building in Carlton Husthwaite, a building in North Yorkshire, in England.

The building was constructed as a manor house, probably in about 1685. It lies at the west end of the village street. In the 20th century, its roofs were replaced, as were many of the windows, and a single-storey extension was added at the rear. It was Grade II* listed in 1960.

The house is constructed of brick on a stone plinth, with a moulded floor band, a modillion cornice, and a pantile roof with stone copings and kneelers. There are two storeys and an attic, a double depth plan with an M-shaped roof, and five bays, the middle bay projecting slightly. The doorway is in the right return, and in the left return is a French window. The windows are sashes with moulded sills and flat arches. Inside, there are early oak fittings including panelling and staircases, and an 18th-century cast iron grate. Historic England state that "the internal fittings in this house are of unusually high quality".

== See also ==
- Grade II* listed buildings in North Yorkshire (district)
- Listed buildings in Carlton Husthwaite
