= Listed buildings in Thormanby =

Thormanby is a civil parish in the county of North Yorkshire, England. It contains four listed buildings that are recorded in the National Heritage List for England. Of these, one is listed at Grade II*, the middle of the three grades, and the others are at Grade II, the lowest grade. The parish contains the village of Thormanby and the surrounding countryside, and the listed buildings consist of a church, a former rectory, a barn and a milepost.

== Key ==
| Grade | Criteria |
|---|---|
| II* | Particularly important buildings of more than special interest |
| II | Buildings of national importance and special interest |

== Buildings ==
| Name and location | Photograph | Date | Notes | Grade |
|---|---|---|---|---|
| St Mary Magdalene's Church; 54.16814°N 1.24187°W | | 12th century | The church has been altered and extended through the centuries, and the tower dates from 1822. The tower is in brick, the body of the church is in sandstone, and the roofs are in Welsh slate. The church consists of a nave, a south porch, a chancel, a north vestry and a west tower. The tower has segmental-arched windows, bell openings with a single light, segmental heads and louvres, and a pyramidal roof. The gabled porch has a Tudor arched doorway and slit vents, and inside it are stone seats. The windows on the south side of the church are mullioned. | II* |
| The Old Rectory; 54.16704°N 1.24584°W | — | 1737 | The rectory, with a schoolroom added in 1786, later a private house, is in painted stuccoed red brick, with roofs of Welsh slate and pantile. There is a front of two storeys and an attic, and three storeys at the rear, a front of three bays, a rear wing, and the schoolroom on the right. In the centre is a projecting porch with paired pilasters, a fanlight and a pediment, flanked by bay windows with pilasters. Elsewhere, most of the windows are sashes, with some casements at the rear. | II |
| Barn at Thormanby Mill; 54.16881°N 1.25800°W | — | Early 19th century | The barn is in red brick, with tabled and dentilled eaves, and a pantile roof with stone coping and shaped kneelers. There are five bays, and it contains cart entries and vents, and on the left return is a loading door. | II |
| Mile Post on Birdforth Bridge; 54.17474°N 1.25638°W | | Late 19th century | The milepost on the east side of the A19 road is in cast iron. It has a triangular plan and a sloping top. On each side is a pointing hand, the left side is inscribed "BIRDFORTH" and the right side "BULMER WEST". | II |
