= Carlton Husthwaite =

Village and civil parish in North Yorkshire, England

Coordinates: 54°11′00″N 1°14′13″W

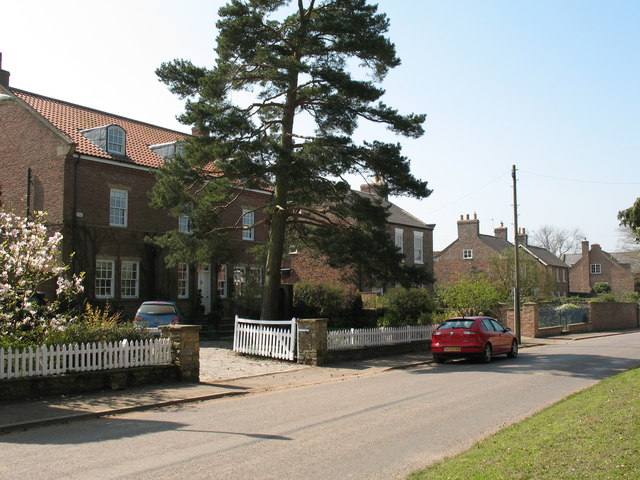
- Village Street, Carlton Husthwaite

- Location within North Yorkshire
- Population: 180 (2011 census)
- Civil parish: Carlton Husthwaite
- Unitary authority: North Yorkshire
- Ceremonial county: North Yorkshire
- Region: Yorkshire and the Humber
- Country: England
- Sovereign state: United Kingdom
- Post town: THIRSK
- Postcode district: YO7
- Police: North Yorkshire
- Fire: North Yorkshire
- Ambulance: Yorkshire
- UK Parliament: Thirsk and Malton

Carlton Husthwaite is a village and civil parish in the county of North Yorkshire, England, about seven miles south-east of Thirsk. According to the 2001 census it had a population of 167, increasing to 180 at the 2011 Census.

== History ==
The village is mentioned in the Domesday Book as Carleton in the Yarlestre hundred. At the time of the Norman invasion, the lord of the manor was Ulf of Carleton, subsequently the lands were granted to the Archbishop of York.

The etymology of Carlton is derived from a combination the Old Norse word Carl, meaning free peasants, and the Anglo-Saxon word -ton, meaning farm or settlement. The second part of the name is derived from the Old Norse words of Hus and thwaite, for houses and meadow respectively.

Notable houses in the village include The Thatched Cottage, a timber framed building, and the former manor house, The Old Hall.

== Governance ==
The village lies within the Thirsk and Malton UK Parliament constituency. From 1974 to 2023 it was part of the Hambleton District. It is now administered by the unitary North Yorkshire Council.

== Geography ==
The nearest settlements to the village are Birdforth 0.9 miles (1.4 km) to the south-west; Thormanby 1.1 miles (1.8 km) to the south south-west; Husthwaite 1.6 miles (2.6 km) to the south-east; Coxwold 2.4 miles (3.9 km) to the east and Thirkleby 1.8 miles (2.9 km) to the north-east.

The 2001 UK Census recorded the population as 167, of which 139 were over the age of sixteen and 82 of those were in employment. There were 72 dwellings of which 38 were detached.

There are a total of thirteen Grade II listed buildings (three II* listed) in the village, including the Church and the K6 style telephone kiosk.

== Religion ==
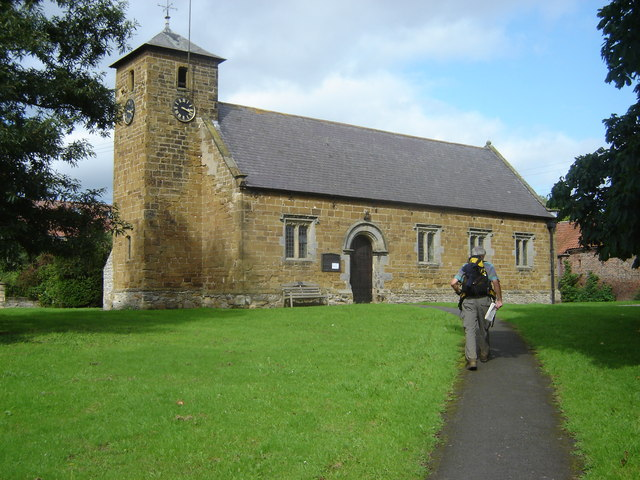
Carlton Husthwaite Church

St Mary's Church, Carlton Husthwaite is Grade II* listed, and was erected in 1685 as a chapel of ease, though there may have been an earlier building on the same site. It underwent a renovation in 1885. A Wesleyan Chapel was also built in the village in 1869, but is now a private residence.

== See also ==
- Listed buildings in Carlton Husthwaite
