= St Cuthbert's Church, Sessay =

Church in Sessay, North Yorkshire, England

Coordinates: 54.1663°N 1.2904°W

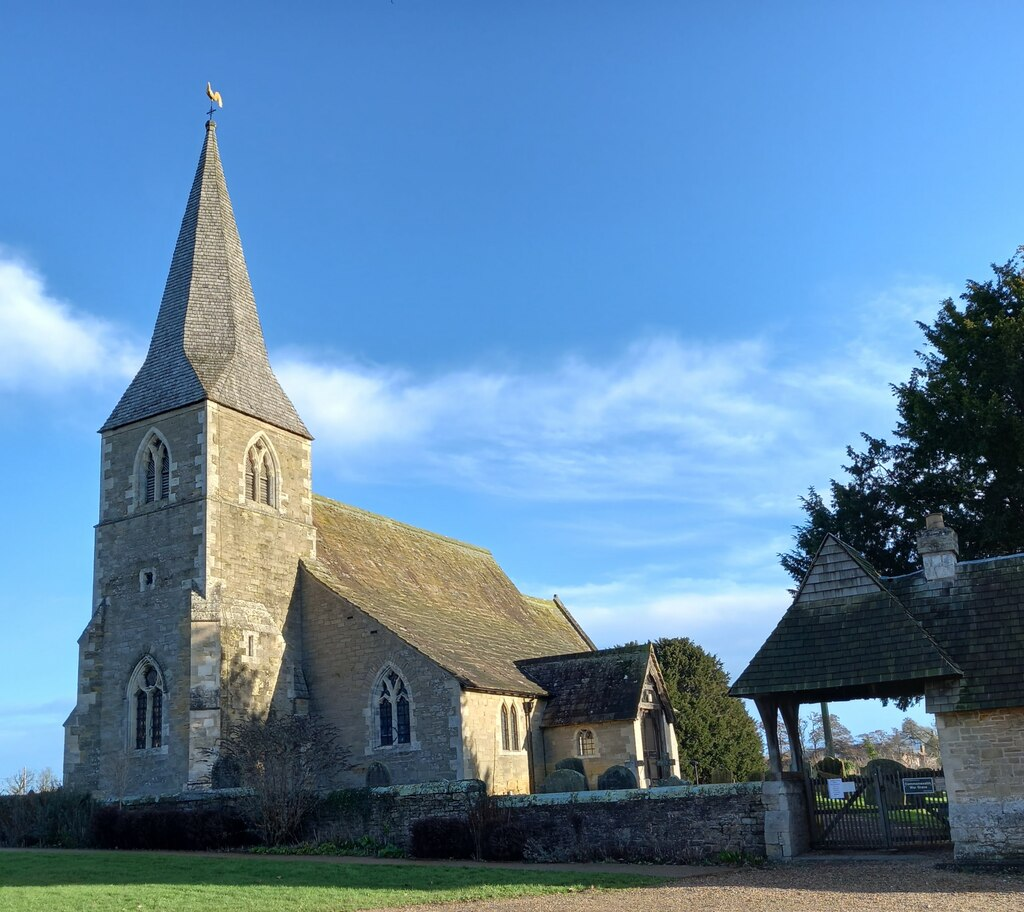
The church, in 2023

St Cuthbert's Church is the parish church of Sessay, a village in North Yorkshire, in England.

A church was built in Sessay in the Norman period; it retained zigzag mouldings and had stained glass including a bird playing the bagpipes, and a chest containing bones. It was demolished in the 1840s, and a new church was built between 1847 and 1848. It was paid for by William Dawnay, 7th Viscount Downe, and was designed by William Butterfield. The building was restored in 1883. It was grade II* listed in 1988.

The church is built of stone with a stone slate roof. It consists of a nave, a south aisle, a south porch, a chancel with a north vestry, and a west steeple. The steeple has a tower with two stages, quoins, buttresses, a two-light west window, a square-headed north window, two-light bell openings and a shingled broach spire with a weathercock. Inside, there is an octagonal font and a memorial brass to Walter Thomas Magnus, Archdeacon of the North Riding, who died in 1550.

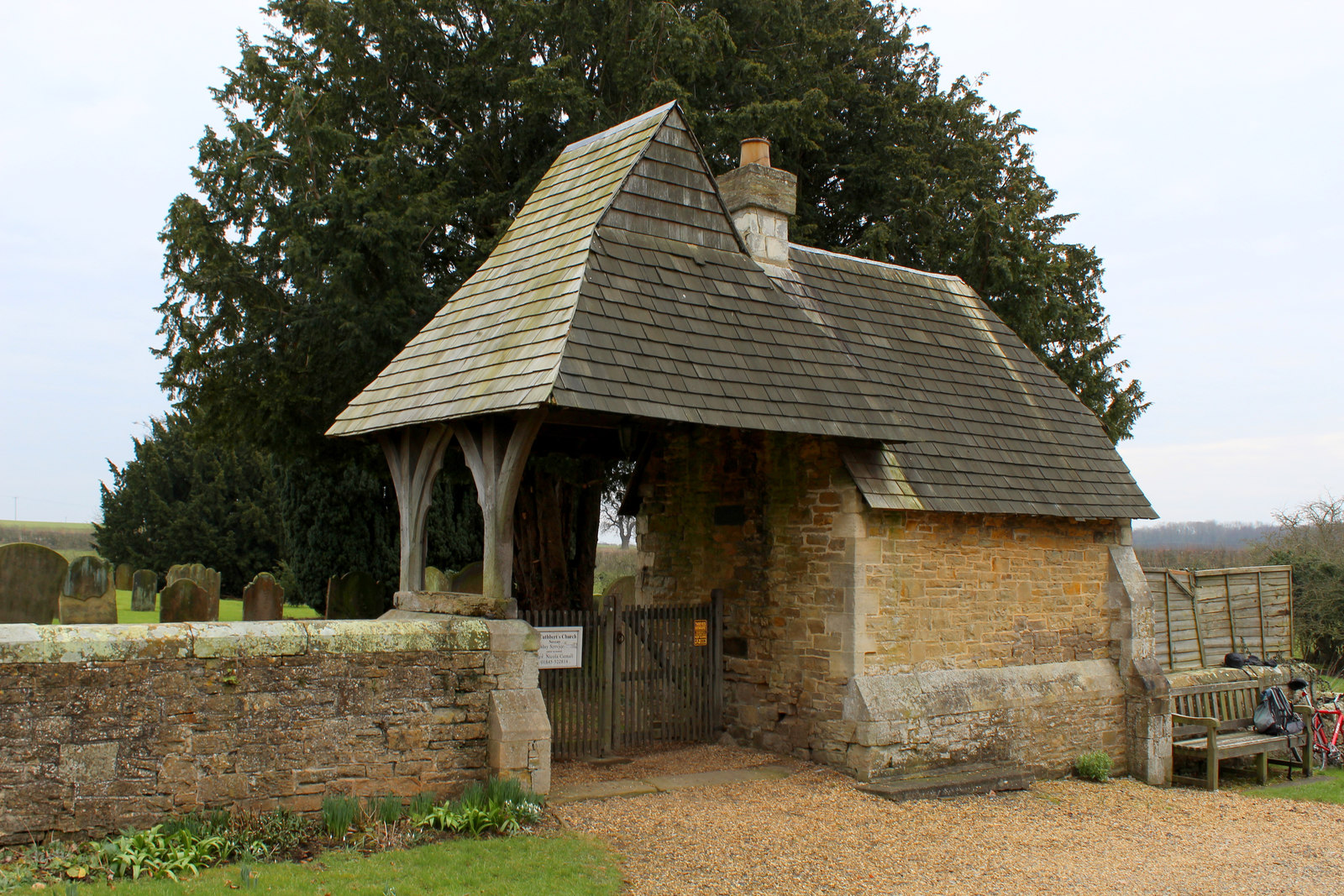
The lychgate

The lychgate, consisting of a gateway to the north and a boiler house to the south, was also designed by Butterfield, and both parts have wood shingled roofs. The gateway has wooden gates, a low stone wall and posts supporting the roof. The boiler house is in stone on a chamfered plinth, with quoins and buttresses. It contains a doorway with a pointed arch and a chamfered quoined surround, and slit windows. It is also grade II listed.

== See also ==
- Grade II* listed churches in North Yorkshire (district)
- Listed buildings in Sessay
