= Birdforth =

Village and civil parish in North Yorkshire, England

Coordinates: 54.17751°N 1.25761°W

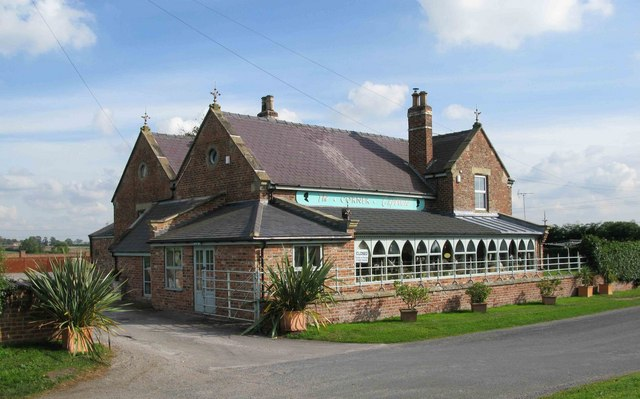
- The Corner Cupboard, Birdforth

- Location within North Yorkshire
- Population: 13
- OS grid reference: SE485557
- Civil parish: Birdforth
- Unitary authority: North Yorkshire
- Ceremonial county: North Yorkshire
- Region: Yorkshire and the Humber
- Country: England
- Sovereign state: United Kingdom
- Post town: YORK
- Postcode district: YO61 4
- Police: North Yorkshire
- Fire: North Yorkshire
- Ambulance: Yorkshire
- UK Parliament: Thirsk and Malton

Birdforth is a village and civil parish in the county of North Yorkshire, England. According to the 2001 census, it had a population of 13. The population remained below 100 at the 2011 Census, with details included in the civil parish of Long Marston, North Yorkshire. The village lies on the A19 road, about six miles south of Thirsk.

== History ==
Birdforth was also the name of one of the wapentakes, or subdivisions, of the North Riding of Yorkshire, which covered the area around the whole village. A school was built in 1875 but closed in 1961.

== Governance ==
The village lies within the Thirsk and Malton UK Parliament constituency. From 1974 to 2023 it was part of the Hambleton District. It is now administered by the unitary North Yorkshire Council.

== Geography ==
The nearest settlements to the village are Hutton Sessay 0.8 miles (1.3 km) to the north-west; Carlton Husthwaite 0.9 miles (1.4 km) to the north-east and Thormanby 0.7 miles (1.1 km) to the south. Birdforth Beck, which flows at the south end of the village, is part of the tributary system of the River Swale.

The 1881 UK Census recorded the population as 42.

== Religion ==
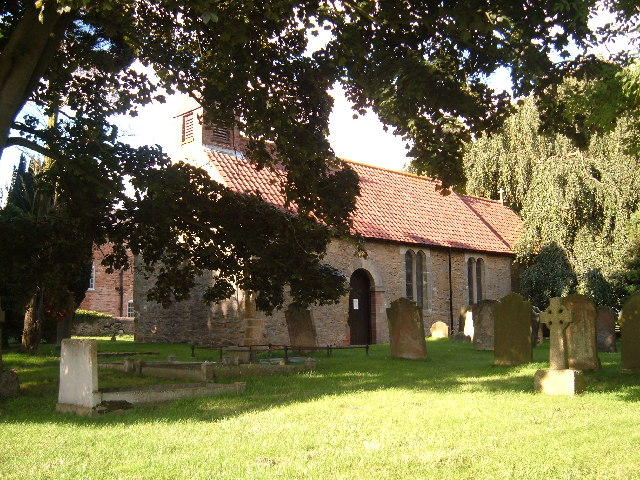
St Mary's Church, Birdforth

St Mary's Church, Birdforth is a grade II listed Norman church; it was partly rebuilt in 1585, but is no longer in use.

== See also ==
- Listed buildings in Birdforth
