= St Mary Magdalene's Church, Thormanby =

Church in Thormanby, North Yorkshire, England

Coordinates: 54°10′05″N 1°14′31″W

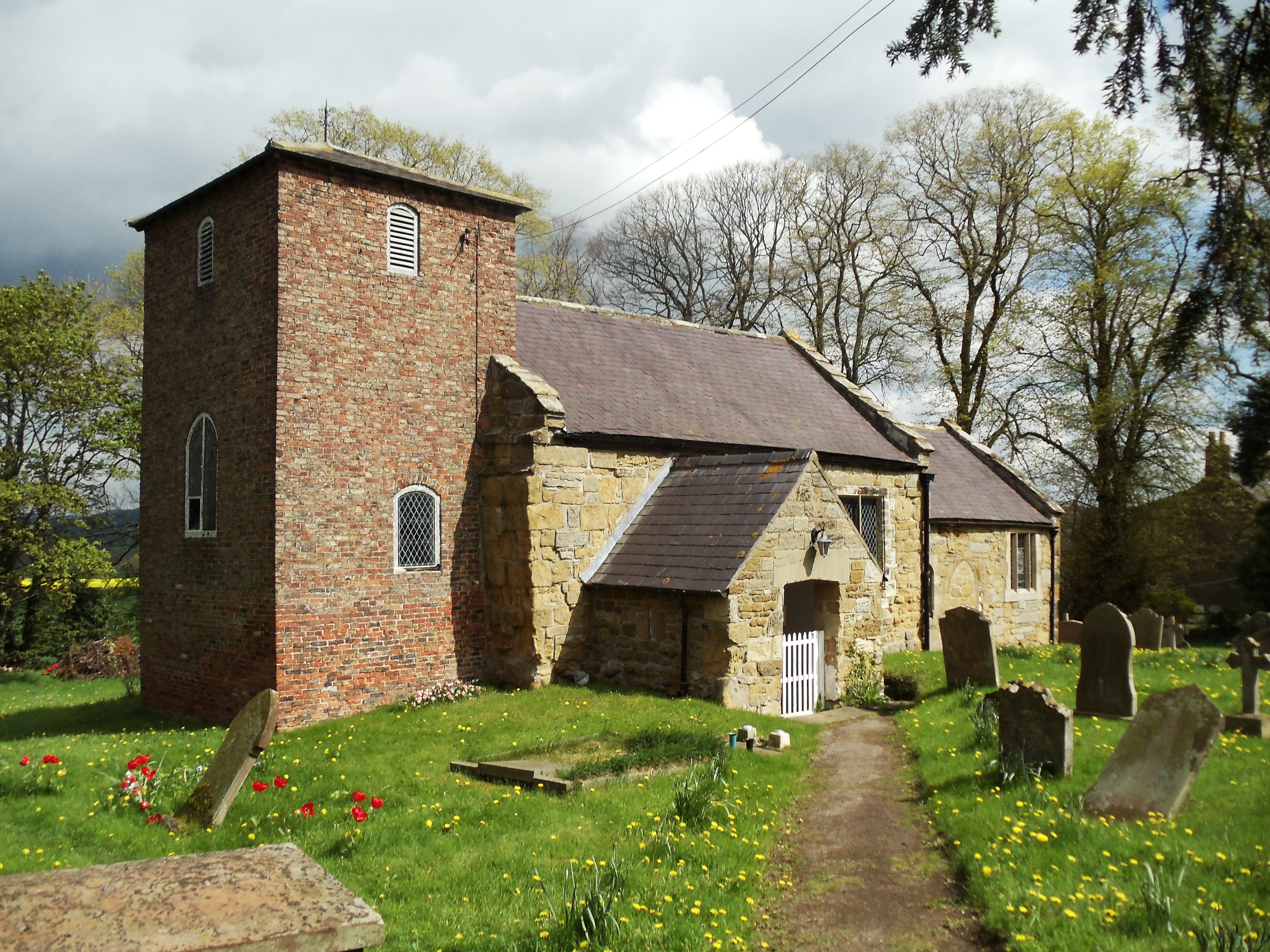
The church, in 2013

St Mary Magdalene's Church is the parish church of Thormanby, a village in North Yorkshire, in England.

The church was built in the 12th century, from which period the nave and chancel survive. A north aisle was added in about 1200, and the east wall of the chancel was rebuilt later that century. The north aisle was removed post-Reformation, the chancel roof was rebuilt in the 17th century, and a south porch was added in the 18th century. The tower was rebuilt in 1822, and a north vestry was added in about 1900. The building was restored in 1955 by Brierley, Syme and Leckenby, and it was grade II* listed in 1960.

The tower is in brick, the body of the church is in sandstone, and the roofs are in Welsh slate. The church consists of a nave, a south porch, a chancel, a north vestry and a west tower. The tower has segmental-arched windows, bell openings with a single light, segmental heads and louvres, and a pyramidal roof. The gabled porch has a Tudor arched doorway and slit vents, and inside it are stone seats. The windows on the south side of the church are mullioned. Inside are Victorian pews, wooden panelling on the lower parts of the walls, and a stone stoup. There is a Mediaeval grave cover, a 14th-century octagonal font, a 17th-century Gothic tester over the pulpit, and an old reading desk made up of early panelling. The east window has stained glass of about 1900 by Charles Eamer Kempe, and the southeast chancel window has Mediaeval glass which was installed from elsewhere in 1952.

== See also ==
- Grade II* listed churches in North Yorkshire (district)
- Listed buildings in Thormanby
