= St Mary's Church, Birdforth =

Coordinates: 54.1756°N 1.2565°W

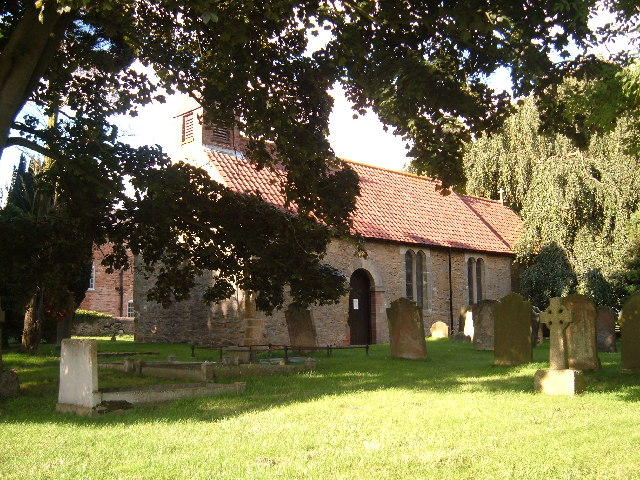
- St Mary's Church, Birdforth, from the south-west

- Location in North Yorkshire
- OS grid reference: SE 486 757
- Location: Birdforth, North Yorkshire
- Country: England
- Denomination: Anglican
- Website: Churches Conservation Trust

History
- Former name: Birdforth Old Chapel

Architecture
- Functional status: Redundant
- Heritage designation: Grade II
- Designated: 20 June 1966
- Architectural type: Church
- Groundbreaking: 12th century
- Completed: 19th century

Specifications
- Materials: Stone rubble, tiled roofs

St Mary's Church, or Birdforth Old Chapel, is a former Anglican church in the village of Birdforth, North Yorkshire, England. It is recorded in the National Heritage List for England as a designated Grade II listed building, and is under the care of the Churches Conservation Trust.

== History ==
The fabric of the church dates from the 12th century, with additions or alterations in the 16–17th, 18th and 19th centuries. The church was declared redundant, or no longer open for worship, on 1 November 1975, and was vested in the Trust on 20 October 1978.

== Architecture ==
=== Exterior ===
The church is constructed in stone rubble and has a roof of interlocking tiles. Its plan is simple, consisting of a four-bay nave and a single-bay chancel. At the corner are quoins. At the west end is a brick bellcote with louvred bell openings. Its roof is covered in Welsh slates, is pyramidal in shape, and at its apex is an iron finial. At the east end on the chancel gable is a cross. In the south wall of the nave is a round-arched doorway, to the right of which are two round-arched two-light windows.

=== Interior ===
Internally there is a round chancel arch. In the north wall of the chancel is a carved stone coat of arms dated 1585. The lectern dates from the 17th century and the pulpit from about 1700. The font is from the 12th century and consists of a circular tub on a later base, with a 17th century cover. In the chancel is a tomb, probably from the 14th century, the top of which is carved with a sword.

== See also ==
- List of churches preserved by the Churches Conservation Trust in Northern England
- Listed buildings in Birdforth
