= Birdforth (wapentake) =

Ancient division of Yorkshire, England

- Wapentake
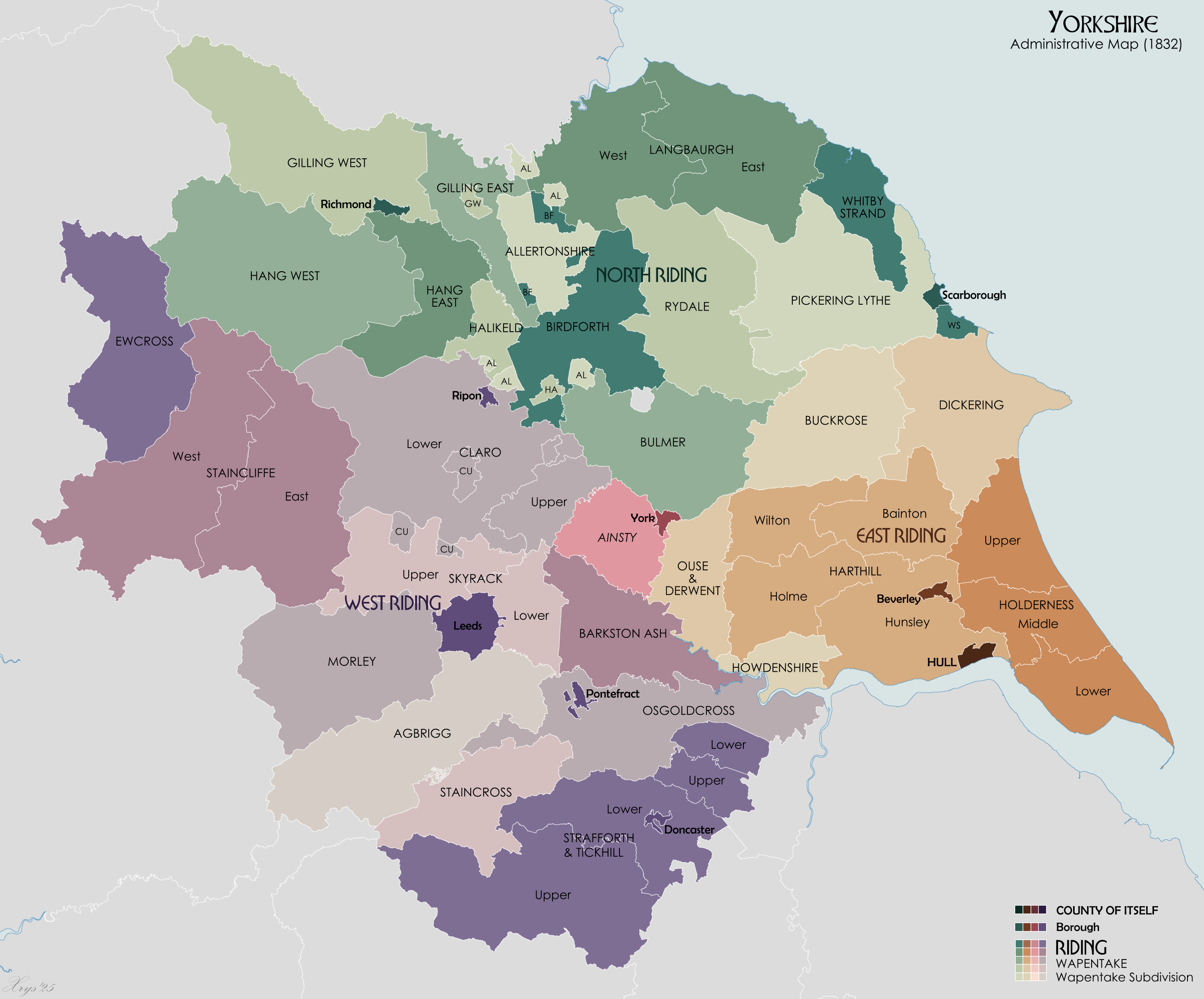
- Wapentakes of North Yorkshire in 1832

Birdforth was a wapentake of the North Riding of Yorkshire. In 1859, it had an area of about 96,000 acres (39,000 ha).

In Domesday, the wapentake was named "Gerlestre". It shared its name with its meeting place, although it the location has been lost. In the mid 12th century, it was recorded as "Brideford", named for the village which later became known as Birdforth, that probably being the new location of its court. By the end of the 13th century, East Harlsey and Hawnby had been added to the wapentake. It thereafter consisted of the parishes of Cold Kirby, Cowesby, Coxwold, East Harlsey, Hawnby, Husthwaite; South Kilvington; Kirby Knowle, Old Byland, Over Silton, South Kilvington, South Otterington, Thirkleby, Thirsk, Topcliffe, and Welbury. Kilburn was originally in Allertonshire, but by 1831 was instead divided between Birdforth and the West Riding of Yorkshire.
