= Listed buildings in Sessay =

Sessay is a civil parish in the county of North Yorkshire, England. It contains 18 listed buildings that are recorded in the National Heritage List for England. Of these, one is listed at Grade II*, the middle of the three grades, and the others are at Grade II, the lowest grade. The parish contains the villages of Sessay and Little Sessay, and the surrounding countryside. The listed buildings consist of houses, cottages and associated structures, farmhouses and farm buildings, bridges, a church and associated structures, and a school and master's house.

== Key ==
Grade	Criteria
II*	Particularly important buildings of more than special interest
II	Buildings of national importance and special interest

== Buildings ==
Name and location	Photograph	Date	Notes	Grade
Bridge over Birdforth Beck; 54.16585°N 1.29088°W	—	Medieval (probable)	The bridge carries Race Lane over the stream, the oldest part being the arch, and the rest dating from the mid-19th century. It is in stone, and consists of a single double-chamfered pointed arch. The bridge has five ribs, buttresses, and a parapet with chamfered coping. On each side is an ogee-headed niche containing a shield with a coat of arms. The side walls end in quoined buttresses.	II
Churchyard cross 54.16620°N 1.29054°W	—	Late medieval	The cross is in the churchyard of St Cuthbert's Church, and part of it was renewed in the 19th century. It is in stone, and has a four-piece hexagonal base, on which is an octagonal pedestal with a chamfered top edge and a socket. In the socket is a section of old shaft, square at the base and becoming hexagonal above. The top section has been renewed and is surmounted by a cross finial on a stepped pedestal.	II
The Old Rectory; 54.16981°N 1.29439°W	—	18th century	The rectory, which was repaired and altered after a fire in 1926, is rendered, on a plinth, and has a hipped Welsh slate roof. There are two storeys, seven bays, and a single-storey wing on the left. The middle bay is recessed, and contains a doorway in a moulded architrave and has a bracketed hood. The windows on the main block are sashes, on the wing and the right return are French windows, and at the rear is a round-arched stair window.	II
Barn, Bruce House; 54.18780°N 1.31086°W	—	Late 18th century (probable)	The barn is in red brown brick with a dentilled eaves course and a pantile roof. There are five bays, and it contains a projecting cart entry on the south side, three tiers of slit vents and an inserted window.	II
Manor Farmhouse; 54.17351°N 1.30355°W	—	Late 18th century	The farmhouse, later a private house, is in red-brown brick, with a floor band, dentilled eaves and a pantile roof. There are two storeys, and three bays, the right bay lower with a rear wing and an outshut in the angle. On the front is a gabled porch, and the windows are sashes.	II
Garden wall, Manor Farmhouse; 54.17356°N 1.30381°W	—	Late 18th century	The wall enclosing three sides of the rectangular garden to the south of the house is in reddish brick with flat stone coping, and is fronted by a ha-ha.	II
Bridge over Crakehill Beck; 54.15879°N 1.32226°W		c. 1800	The bridge carries Blind Piece Lane over the stream. It is in stone and consists of a single horseshoe arch. The bridge has a band, a parapet with chamfered coping, and pilaster buttresses at the ends.	II
Woodmans House Farmhouse; 54.15482°N 1.28204°W	—	1820	The farmhouse is in mottled pinkish-brown brick, and has a hipped slate roof. There are two storeys, two bays, a wing at the rear on the right, and a single-storey addition in the angle. Steps lead up to the doorway that has an architrave and an inscribed and dated lintel. The windows are sashes with segmental brick arches.	II
Barn, horse engine house and cartshed, Manor Farm; 54.17321°N 1.30312°W	—	Early 19th century	The buildings are in pinkish-brown brick with dentilled eaves and pantile roofs. The barn has four bays, and contains a doorway and vents. Projecting from it is a horse engine house with four sides and windows. Attached to the right of the barn is a three-bay cartshed, with three round-arched cart openings, and steps leading to a granary above.	II
Throstle Nest; 54.15135°N 1.26356°W	—	Early 19th century	The farmhouse is in pinkish-brown brick, with dentilled eaves and a pantile roof. There are two storeys, two bays and a recessed bay on the right. In the centre is a doorway with a fanlight, and the windows are sashes, the window in the recessed bay horizontally sliding.	II
Barn and horse engine house, Village Farm; 54.16970°N 1.30012°W	—	Early 19th century	The buildings are in pinkish brick, with stepped dentilled eaves, and hipped pantile roofs. The barn has five bays, and contains a doorway and vents. Projecting from it is a hexagonal horse engine house with brick piers between the side panels.	II
Barn north of Wood End; 54.15842°N 1.27809°W		Early 19th century	A combination farm building in orange-red brick with dentilled eaves and a hipped pantile roof. It consists of a barn with three bays, and a three-bay cartshed to the right, and between them are steps leading to a granary over the cartshed. The barn contains cart doors, three tiers of vents and a segmental archway. In the cartshed are three segmental arches divided by circular brick piers with stone imposts.	II
St Cuthbert's Church; 54.16631°N 1.29045°W		1847–48	The church, designed by William Butterfield, is in stone with a stone slate roof. It consists of a nave, a south aisle, a south porch, a chancel with a north vestry, and a west steeple. The steeple has a tower with two stages, quoins, buttresses, a two-light west window, a square-headed north window, two-light bell openings and a shingled broach spire with a weathercock.	II*
Churchyard wall, St Cuthbert's Church; 54.16619°N 1.28987°W	—	1847–48	The wall enclosing the churchyard, which was extended in about 1910, is in stone with chamfered coping and quoins at the corners. On the south side of the south wall are quoined buttresses, and the east wall has a gateway.	II
Lychgate, St Cuthbert's Church; 54.16612°N 1.29065°W		1848	The lychgate, consisting of a gateway to the north and a boiler house to the south, was designed by William Butterfield, and both parts have wood shingled roofs. The gateway has wooden gates, a low stone wall and posts supporting the roof. The boiler house is in stone on a chamfered plinth, with quoins and buttresses. It contains a doorway with a pointed arch and a chamfered quoined surround, and slit windows.	II
School and master's house 54.16659°N 1.29087°W		1848	The school and house were designed by William Butterfield, and are in stone with quoins and stone slate roofs, and both have a single storey. The school on the left has two bays, the right bay gabled, and an L-shaped plan. There are paired windows with pointed arches, transoms and cusped heads, to the left is a triangular-headed doorway, and between them is a clock. The house has a central timber porch and a three-light window on the right.	II
Downe House Farmhouse; 54.17093°N 1.30166°W		c. 1850	A public house designed by G. T. Andrews, later a private house, it is in pinkish brick with stone dressings, rusticated quoins, a moulded string course, an eaves cornice, and a slate roof with raised verges, coped gables and moulded kneelers. There are two storeys and attics and three bays. In the centre is a full height gabled porch containing a Tudor arched doorway with a cornice, above which is a panel in an architrave, and in the gable is a quatrefoil. Flanking the porch are bay windows, most of the other windows are cross windows, there are some narrow windows, and on the attics are two gabled dormers.	II
Honeysuckle Cottage and Path Head; 54.17483°N 1.30569°W	—	c. 1850	A pair of cottages designed by William Butterfield in pinkish brick, with a roof in purplish tile, half-hipped on the left and hipped on the right. There is one storey and attics, two bays, a gabled cross wing on the right with timber framing in the attic, and a rear outshut. The cross wing has a bow window and a 20th-century window above, to the left is a doorway above which is a small window, and further to the left are small-pane windows, one in a gabled dormer.	II
