= The Thatched Cottage =

Historic house in Carlton Husthwaite, North Yorkshire, England

Coordinates: 54°11′00″N 1°14′12″W

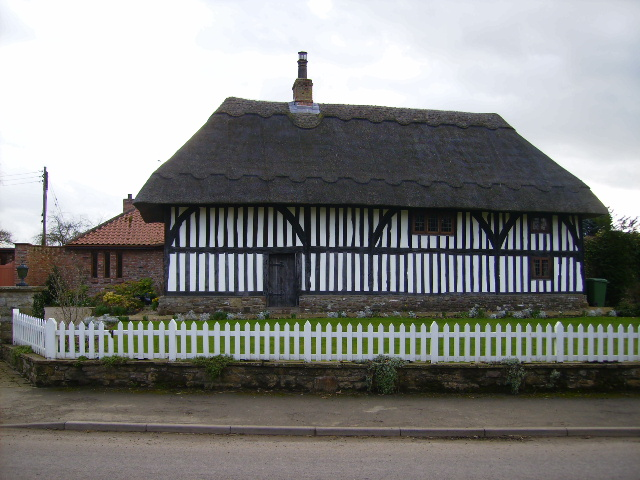
The house, in 2007

The Thatched Cottage is a historic house in Carlton Husthwaite, a village in North Yorkshire in England.

The building was constructed as a timber-framed open hall house, probably in the 16th century. The prominent wall studs were added later, nailed onto the original frame. The building was Grade II* listed in 1960. However, it was altered in about 1968, when the through passage and rear aisle was removed, and a large single-storey extension was added at the rear left. The exposed timber frame at the rear was then infilled with brick. The house was rethatched with water reed in 2000. In 2018, it was put up for sale for £995,000, at which time, it had three bedrooms, two bathrooms, a kitchen, drawing room, dining room, garden room, and study.

The house is timber framed on a stone plinth, with close studding on the front, brick infill at the rear, and a hipped thatched roof. It has two storeys and is three-and-a-half bays wide. On the front are a doorway, one three-light window, and two two-light windows.

== See also ==
- Grade II* listed buildings in North Yorkshire (district)
- Listed buildings in Carlton Husthwaite
