= Listed buildings in Hutton Sessay =

Hutton Sessay is a civil parish in the county of North Yorkshire, England. It contains three listed buildings that are recorded in the National Heritage List for England. All the listed buildings are designated at Grade II, the lowest of the three grades, which is applied to "buildings of national importance and special interest". The parish contains the village of Hutton Sessay and the surrounding countryside, and the listed buildings consist of farmhouse, a farm and a house.

== Buildings ==
Name and location	Photograph	Date	Notes
Hall Farmhouse; 54.17924°N 1.27203°W		Late 18th century	The farmhouse, later divided into two houses, is in orange-brown brick, with a floor band, an eaves course of soldier bricks, and a pantile roof. There are two storeys and three bays. On the front is a doorway with a fanlight in an architrave, and the windows are sashes.
Moor House Farm; 54.17986°N 1.30040°W		Early to mid 19th century	The farmhouse and the farm buildings are in brick with pantile roofs. The farmhouse has two storeys and two bays. It contains stepped eaves, a doorway, and horizontally-sliding sash windows. To the rear are the farm buildings, forming three ranges around a courtyard.
The Manor House; 54.17890°N 1.27418°W	—	Early to mid 19th century	The house is in pinkish-brown brick with a Welsh slate roof. There are two storeys and three bays. The central doorway has pilasters and a cornice. The windows are sashes, with wedge lintels incised as voussoirs, and keystones.
