= Listed buildings in Birdforth =

Birdforth is a civil parish in the county of North Yorkshire, England. It contains two listed buildings that are recorded in the National Heritage List for England. Both the listed buildings are designated at Grade II, the lowest of the three grades, which is applied to "buildings of national importance and special interest". The parish contains the village of Birdforth and the surrounding area, and the listed buildings consist of a church and a milepost.

== Buildings ==
Name and location	Photograph	Date	Notes
St Mary's Church; 54.17560°N 1.25655°W		12th century	The church has been altered and extended through the centuries. It is in stone with a tile roof, and consists of a four-bay nave and a single-bay chancel. On the west gable is a 19th-century brick belfry with louvred bell openings, and a pyramidal Welsh slate roof with a cross finial. The south doorway is round-arched with a quoined surround and imposts, and to its right are two windows, each with two round-arched lights.
Milepost; 54.17477°N 1.25639°W		Mid 19th century	The milepost is on the northeast side of Birdforth Bridge, which carries the A19 road over Birdforth Beck. It is in cast iron and has a triangular plan and a sloping top. On each side are pointing hands, the left side is inscribed "BIRDFORTH" and the right side "BULMER WEST".
