= Listed buildings in Carlton Husthwaite =

Carlton Husthwaite is a civil parish in the county of North Yorkshire, England. It contains 13 listed buildings that are recorded in the National Heritage List for England. Of these, three are listed at Grade II*, the middle of the three grades, and the others are at Grade II, the lowest grade. The parish contains the village of Carlton Husthwaite and the surrounding area. All the listed buildings are in the village, and they consist of houses, cottages and associated structures, a church, a public house and a telephone kiosk.

== Key ==
Grade	Criteria
II*	Particularly important buildings of more than special interest
II	Buildings of national importance and special interest

== Buildings ==
Name and location	Photograph	Date	Notes	Grade
Oak Lea; 54.18369°N 1.23807°W	—	Late 15th century (probable)	The cottage, which has been altered, is in brick, and has a pantile roof with stone coping and shaped kneelers. There are two storeys and an attic, and three bays. In the centre is a round-headed doorway with a fanlight, above which is a blocked window. In the outer bays are sash windows with projecting stone keystones.	II
Thatch Cottage; 54.18323°N 1.23666°W		16th century (probable)	The house is timber framed on a stone plinth, with close studding on the front, brick infill at the rear, and a hipped thatched roof. There are two storeys, and on the front are a doorway, one three-light window, and two two-light windows.	II*
Carlton House; 54.18329°N 1.23487°W	—	1674	A rear wing in brick was added in the 19th century. The main block is rendered, and has a Welsh slate roof with moulded coping and kneelers, both with nailhead decoration. There are two storeys and three bays. The central doorway has a stone surround, a moulded arris and a segmental-arched head with a projecting keystone containing sunk panels with initials and the date, over which is an ogee cornice. The windows are sashes with projecting sills.	II
Carlton Hall; 54.18362°N 1.23703°W		Late 17th century (probable)	A house that was extended in the 18th century and again in 1856. It is in brick with a roof of artificial stone slate. The original range at the front has two storeys and four bays, and a roof with stone coping and shaped kneelers. In the centre is a doorway with a fanlight, and the windows are sashes. The 19th-century extension recessed on the right is in white brick, it has three storeys, and contains a canted bay window, and has a terrace with a balustrade pierced by quatrefoils.	II
Sunnybank Farmhouse; 54.18341°N 1.23530°W	—	Late 17th century (probable)	The farmhouse, later a private house, was refronted in the 18th century. It is in brick on a sandstone plinth, with a moulded floor band, tabled eaves courses, and a pantile roof. There are two storeys, four bays and a rear outshut. The doorway has unfluted Doric columns and a Tuscan entablature with a cornice. The windows are sashes with exposed boxes and wedge lintels. At the rear are horizontally-sliding sashes.	II
The Old Hall; 54.18379°N 1.23876°W		Late 17th century	A manor house, later a private house, in brick on a stone plinth, with a moulded floor band, a modillion cornice, and a pantile roof with stone copings and kneelers. There are two storeys and an attic, a double depth plan with an M-shaped roof, and five bays, the middle bay projecting slightly. The doorway is in the right return, and in the left return is a French window. The windows are sashes with moulded sills and flat arches.	II*
St Mary's Church; 54.18376°N 1.23573°W		1677 (probable)	The church is in sandstone with gritstone dressings and a Welsh slate roof. It consists of a nave and a chancel in one unit, and a west tower. The tower has three stages, a single-light west window with a hood mould, clock faces, single-light bell openings with chamfered surrounds and ogee heads, and a pyramidal roof with a weathervane. The doorway has a round-arched head with impost capitals, a moulded arris, and a hood mould. The windows on the side of the church have two ogee-headed lights and hood moulds, and the east window has three lights, the middle one taller, in a segmental-arched opening with imposts, a keystone and a hood mould.	II*
Garden wall and gate piers, Carlton Hall; 54.18351°N 1.23667°W		Early 18th century	The wall running along the front of the garden is in red brick with stone coping. Towards the right end are five piers, two flanking gateways and the other at the end. They have a square plan, and each has a stone ogee cap.	II
House and former shop 54.18309°N 1.23494°W	—	Early to mid 18th century	The house is in brick with dentilled eaves and a pantile roof. There are two storeys and an attic, and four bays. In the centre is a trellised porch, and the windows are a mix of casements and sashes, some horizontally-sliding.	II
The Carlton Inn; 54.18363°N 1.23778°W		Early to mid 18th century (probable)	The public house is in brick with tabled eaves and a pantile roof. There are two storeys, three bays, and a rear outshut. The windows are horizontally-sliding sashes with wedge lintels. On the left return is a single-storey semicircular bay window.	II
Swan Cottage; 54.18397°N 1.23602°W		Mid to late 18th century (probable)	The cottage is in sandstone, and has a pantile roof with stone copings and shaped kneelers. There are two storeys and two bays. The doorway is in the centre, and the windows are sashes with two lights and flat arches.	II
The Cedars; 54.18330°N 1.23753°W	—	Late 18th to early 19th century	The house is in brick, and has a Welsh slate roof with stone copings and shaped kneelers. There are two storeys and an attic, and three bays. The central doorway has a fanlight with decorative glazing, and the windows are sashes with wedge lintels.	II
Telephone kiosk 54.18338°N 1.23543°W	—	1935	The K6 type telephone kiosk was designed by Giles Gilbert Scott. Constructed in cast iron with a square plan and a dome, it has three unperforated crowns in the top panels.	II
