= Hutton Sessay =

Village and civil parish in North Yorkshire, England

Coordinates: 54.179002°N 1.273352°W

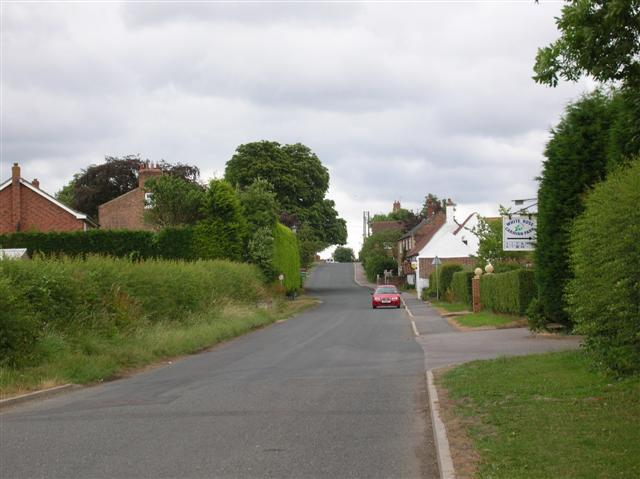
- Hutton Sessay

- Location within North Yorkshire
- Population: 100
- OS grid reference: SE475761
- Civil parish: Hutton Sessay
- Unitary authority: North Yorkshire
- Ceremonial county: North Yorkshire
- Region: Yorkshire and the Humber
- Country: England
- Sovereign state: United Kingdom
- Post town: THIRSK
- Postcode district: YO7
- Police: North Yorkshire
- Fire: North Yorkshire
- Ambulance: Yorkshire
- UK Parliament: Thirsk and Malton

Hutton Sessay is a village and civil parish in the county of North Yorkshire, England. In 2013 the population of the civil parish was estimated at 100. The village is situated just west of the A19 between Thirsk and Easingwold.

== History ==
Though the village is not mentioned specifically in the Domesday Book, it is thought that some of the lands would have been split between the manors of Sessay and Birdforth and followed the inheritance of those places thereafter. By the end of the 19th century, the village lands were owned by Viscount Downe.

The village used to have both Wesleyan and Primitive Methodist Chapels.

== Governance ==
The village is within the Thirsk and Malton UK Parliament constituency. From 1974 to 2023 it was part of the Hambleton District. It is now administered by the unitary North Yorkshire Council.

== Geography ==
The nearest settlements are Sessay 1.1 miles (1.8 km) to the south-west, Birdforth 0.8 miles (1.3 km) to the south-east and Thirkleby 1.7 miles (2.7 km) to the north.

The 1881 UK Census recorded the population as 131. There is a public house, The Horsebreakers Arms and a caravan park, White Rose Holiday Park in the village.

== See also ==
- Listed buildings in Hutton Sessay
