= St Nicholas' Church, Husthwaite =

Church in Husthwaite, North Yorkshire, England

Coordinates: 54°10′09″N 1°12′28″W

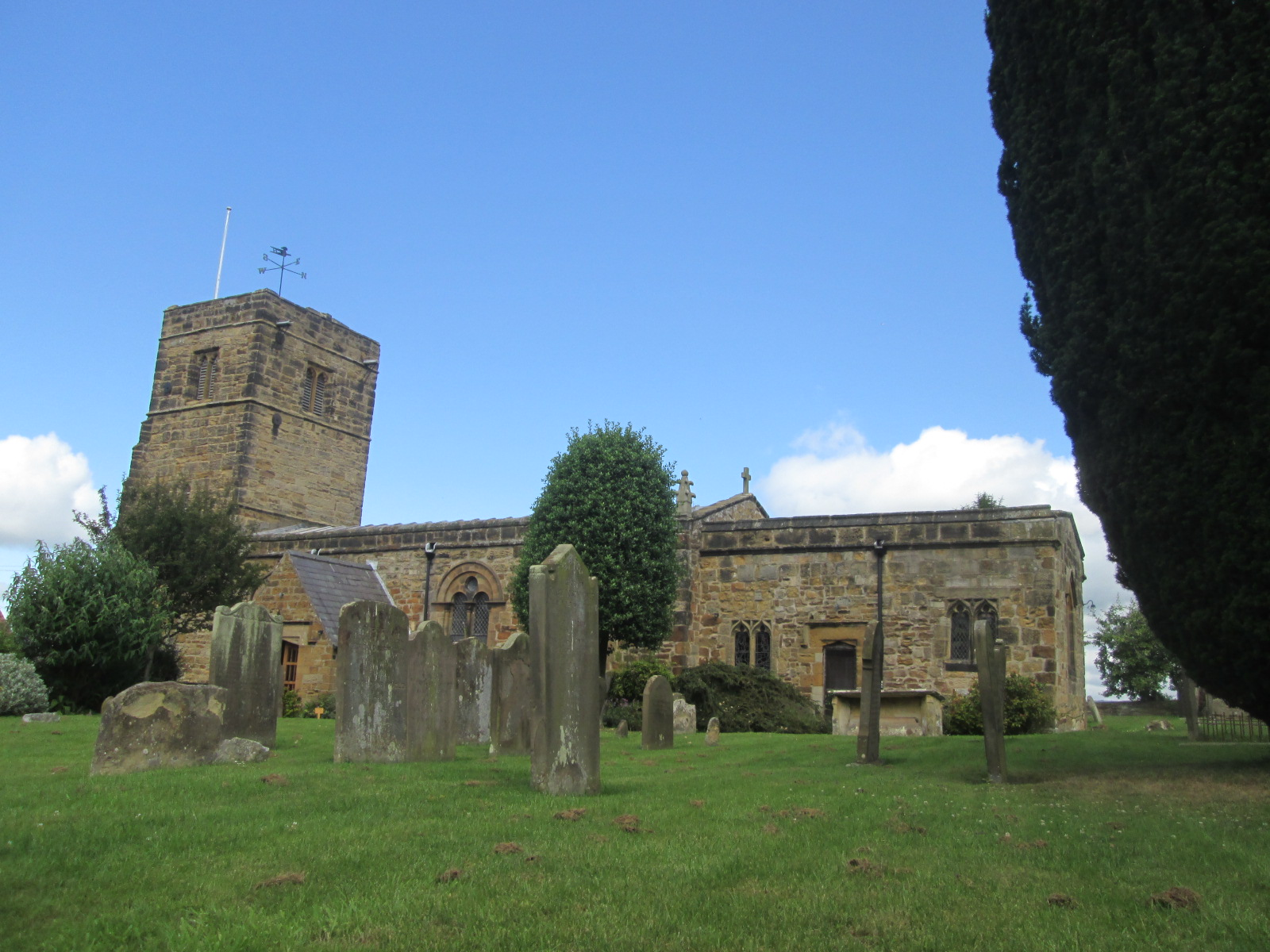
The church, in 2019

St Nicholas' Church is an Anglican church in Husthwaite, a village in North Yorkshire, in England.

The church was built in the 12th century, from which period the nave and chancel survive. The tower was added in the 15th century, and the south doorway was replaced in 1683. A porch was added in 1878, and the church was restored in 1896, the work including replacing the south nave windows. The church was grade II* listed in 1960.

The church is built of sandstone with lead roofs, and consists of a nave, a south porch, a chancel and a west tower. The tower has three stages, a plinth, diagonal buttresses, a three-light west window with a four-centred arch, a string course, two-light bell openings, and a weathervane on the roof. The porch is gabled, and has a triangular-headed doorway with a hood mould. The inner doorway is round-arched with three orders, and spiral capitals and shafts. Inside, there are 17th-century box pews, and an altar rail, pulpit and font cover of similar date. There is a 13th-century lead coffin cross and an early piscina, choir stalls of reused 17th-century woodwork, and a couple of 18th-century wall monuments.

== See also ==
- Grade II* listed churches in North Yorkshire (district)
- Listed buildings in Husthwaite
