= Husthwaite =

Village and civil parish in North Yorkshire, England

Coordinates: 54°10′07″N 1°12′24″W

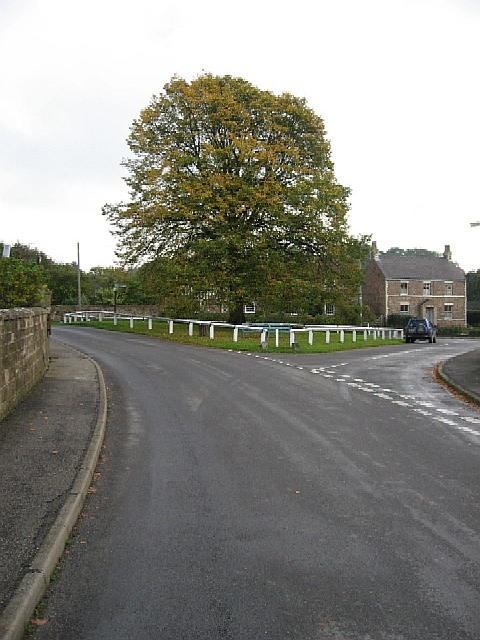
- The Village Green, Husthwaite

- Location within North Yorkshire
- Population: 404 (2011 census)
- OS grid reference: SE518750
  - London: 190 mi (310 km) S
- Civil parish: Husthwaite
- Unitary authority: North Yorkshire
- Ceremonial county: North Yorkshire
- Region: Yorkshire and the Humber
- Country: England
- Sovereign state: United Kingdom
- Post town: YORK
- Postcode district: YO61
- Police: North Yorkshire
- Fire: North Yorkshire
- Ambulance: Yorkshire
- UK Parliament: Thirsk and Malton

Husthwaite is a village and civil parish in the county of North Yorkshire, England. It is situated approximately 2.5 miles (4 km) north of Easingwold.

== History ==
The name probably derives from the Middle English 'hous', from Old English 'hus' meaning a house and thwaite - "a piece of land or land cleared of woods and converted to tillage".

There has been a settlement on the site since before the Norman invasion.

There was a Wesleyan Chapel built in 1841 in the village, now a private residence. A new Methodist building was built in 1928 next door to the old chapel.

== Governance ==
The village lies within the Thirsk and Malton parliamentary constituency. From 1974 to 2023, it was part of the Hambleton District. It is now administered by the unitary North Yorkshire Council.

The local Parish Council has seven members.

== Geography ==
The nearest settlements are Coxwold 1.6 miles (2.6 km) to the north-east; Oulston 1.8 miles (2.9 km) to the east; Carlton Husthwaite 1.6 miles (2.6 km) to the north-west; Thormanby 1.8 miles (2.9 km) to the west and Easingwold 3.4 miles (5.5 km) to the south. Elphin Beck runs to the north of the village and is part of the tributary system of the River Swale.

The 1881 UK Census recorded the population as 436. The 2001 UK Census recorded the population as 417, of which 304 were over the age of sixteen and 194 of those were in employment. There were 175 dwellings of which 94 were detached. The 2011 Census recorded a population of 404.

== Community ==
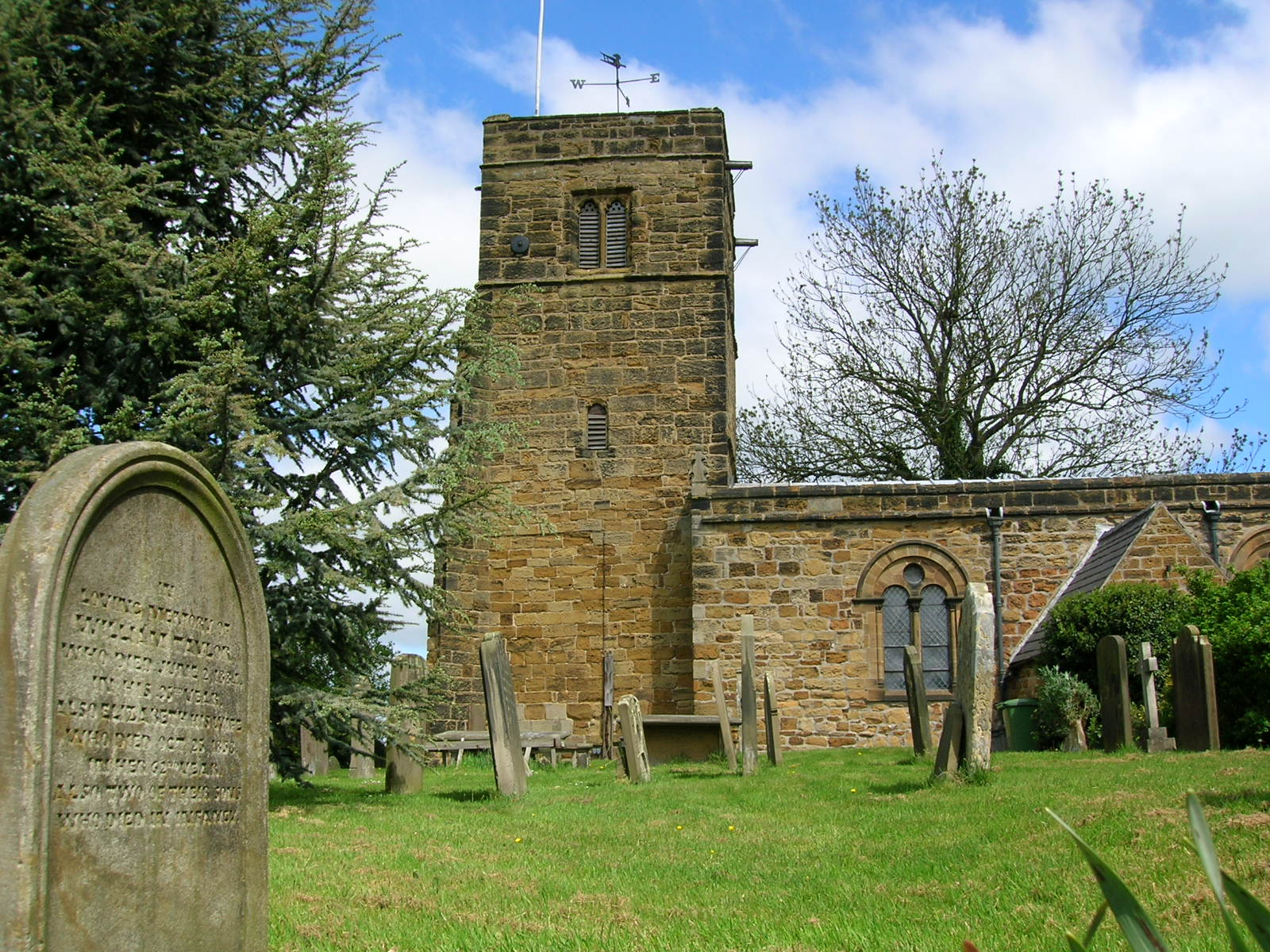
St. Nicholas' Church, Husthwaite

St Nicholas' Church, Husthwaite was built in the 12th century. It is a Grade II* listed building. The village school is Husthwaite CE Primary. A farmers' market is held in the village periodically.

== Transport ==
The village was formerly served by the Thirsk and Malton Line's Husthwaite Gate railway station, located near the Elphin Bridge.

It is now served by the no. 31X bus route running between York and Helmsley.

== Notable people ==
William Peckitt, a stained glass artist, was born in the village in 1731.

== See also ==
- Listed buildings in Husthwaite
