= List of civil parishes in North Yorkshire =

This is a list of civil parishes in the ceremonial county of North Yorkshire, England, including Stockton-on-Tees (south of the river). There are 773 civil parishes, most of the county being parished.

Unparished areas include the former County Borough of York and parts of the former Teesside County Borough. Harrogate and Scarborough were both unparished areas until 1 April 2025.

Population figures are unavailable for some of the smallest parishes.

== A to I ==
Civil Parish	Civil Parish Population 2011	Area (km^{2}) 2011	Pre 1974 District	Pre 2023 District
Acaster Malbis	669	7.57	Tadcaster Rural District	York
Acaster Selby			Tadcaster Rural District	Selby
Acklam			Norton Rural District	Ryedale
Ainderby Miers with Holtby	166	3.64	Bedale Rural District	Hambleton
Ainderby Quernhow	146	5.98	Thirsk Rural District	Hambleton
Ainderby Steeple	298	11.12	Northallerton Rural District	Hambleton
Airton	228	14.81	Settle Rural District	Craven
Aiskew and Leeming Bar	2,427	8.23	Bedale Rural District	Hambleton
Aislaby	243	4.37	Pickering Rural District	Ryedale
Aislaby	201	13.65	Whitby Rural District	Scarborough
Akebar			Leyburn Rural District	Richmondshire
Aldbrough	392	7.32	Richmond Rural District	Richmondshire
Aldfield			Ripon and Pateley Bridge Rural District	Harrogate
Aldwark	308	15.16	Easingwold Rural District	Hambleton
Allerston			Pickering Rural District	Ryedale
Allerton Mauleverer with Hopperton	150	9.22	Nidderdale Rural District	Harrogate
Alne	756	9.17	Easingwold Rural District	Hambleton
Amotherby			Malton Rural District	Ryedale
Ampleforth			Helmsley Rural District	Ryedale
Angram Grange			Easingwold Rural District	Hambleton
Appleton East and West			Richmond Rural District	Richmondshire
Appleton Roebuck	792	18.04	Tadcaster Rural District	Selby
Appleton Wiske	487	7.56	Northallerton Rural District	Hambleton
Appleton-le-Moors			Kirkbymoorside Rural District	Ryedale
Appleton-le-Street with Easthorpe			Malton Rural District	Ryedale
Appletreewick	218	30.25	Skipton Rural District	Craven
Arkendale	394	12.27	Nidderdale Rural District	Harrogate
Arkengarthdale	231	58.90	Reeth Rural District	Richmondshire
Arncliffe	137	25.14	Settle Rural District	Craven
Arrathorne			Leyburn Rural District	Richmondshire
Asenby	311	4.77	Wath Rural District	Harrogate
Aske			Richmond Rural District	Richmondshire
Askham Bryan	564	6.90	Tadcaster Rural District	York
Askham Richard	351	3.96	Tadcaster Rural District	York
Askrigg	563	32.90	Aysgarth Rural District	Richmondshire
Askwith	240	13.64	Wharfedale Rural District	Harrogate
Austwick	463	32.05	Settle Rural District	Craven
Aysgarth	178	4.91	Aysgarth Rural District	Richmondshire
Azerley	340	13.93	Ripon and Pateley Bridge Rural District	Harrogate
Bagby	593	10.26	Thirsk Rural District	Hambleton
Bainbridge	480	56.73	Aysgarth Rural District	Richmondshire
Baldersby	285	7.41	Wath Rural District	Harrogate
Balk			Thirsk Rural District	Hambleton
Balne	224	11.50	Osgoldcross Rural District	Selby
Bank Newton			Skipton Rural District	Craven
Barden			Skipton Rural District	Craven
Barden		10.19	Leyburn Rural District	Richmondshire
Barkston Ash	370	4.71	Tadcaster Rural District	Selby
Barlby with Osgodby	4,974	11.60	Derwent Rural District	Selby
Barlow	753	9.43	Selby Rural District	Selby
Barnby			Whitby Rural District	Scarborough
Barton	837	9.90	Croft Rural District	Richmondshire
Barton-le-Street			Malton Rural District	Ryedale
Barton-le-Willows			Malton Rural District	Ryedale
Barugh (Great and Little)			Pickering Rural District	Ryedale
Beadlam			Helmsley Rural District	Ryedale
Beal	738	7.59	Osgoldcross Rural District	Selby
Beamsley	139	8.56	Skipton Rural District	Craven
Beckwithshaw	425	18.01	Nidderdale Rural District	Harrogate
Bedale (town)	3,156	6.82	Bedale Rural District	Hambleton
Bellerby	364	12.40	Leyburn Rural District	Richmondshire
Beningbrough			Easingwold Rural District	Hambleton
Bentham (town)	3,027	31.22	Settle Rural District	Craven
Bewerley	717	23.37	Ripon and Pateley Bridge Rural District	Harrogate
Biggin	121	2.90	Tadcaster Rural District	Selby
Bilbrough	348	5.86	Tadcaster Rural District	Selby
Bilsdale Midcable	332	57.55	Stokesley Rural District	Hambleton
Bilton-in-Ainsty with Bickerton	463	12.12	Wetherby Rural District	Harrogate
Birdforth			Thirsk Rural District	Hambleton
Birdsall			Norton Rural District	Ryedale
Birkby			Northallerton Rural District	Hambleton
Birkin	141	8.79	Osgoldcross Rural District	Selby
Birstwith	868	7.99	Ripon and Pateley Bridge Rural District	Harrogate
Bishop Monkton	778	8.85	Ripon and Pateley Bridge Rural District	Harrogate
Bishop Thornton, Shaw Mills and Warsill	507	12.69	Ripon and Pateley Bridge Rural District	Harrogate
Bishopdale			Aysgarth Rural District	Richmondshire
Bishopthorpe	3,237	3.96	Tadcaster Rural District	York
Blubberhouses			Wharfedale Rural District	Harrogate
Boltby	143	18.50	Thirsk Rural District	Hambleton
Bolton Abbey	111	8.38	Skipton Rural District	Craven
Bolton Percy	304	9.42	Tadcaster Rural District	Selby
Bolton-on-Swale			Richmond Rural District	Richmondshire
Boroughbridge (town)	3,405	15.17	Nidderdale Rural District	Harrogate
Borrowby	386	6.41	Northallerton Rural District	Hambleton
Borrowby			Whitby Rural District	Scarborough
Bradleys Both	1,244	7.90	Skipton Rural District	Craven
Brafferton and Helperby	831	17.38	Easingwold Rural District	Hambleton
Brandsby-cum-Stearsby	383	23.71	Easingwold Rural District	Hambleton
Bransdale			Kirkbymoorside Rural District	Ryedale
Brawby			Malton Rural District	Ryedale
Brayton	5,299	6.92	Selby Rural District	Selby
Brearton	146	6.31	Nidderdale Rural District	Harrogate
Bridge Hewick			Ripon and Pateley Bridge Rural District	Harrogate
Brompton	2,055	14.97	Northallerton Rural District	Hambleton
Brompton	573	34.44	Scarborough Rural District	Scarborough
Brompton-on-Swale	1,879	12.06	Richmond Rural District	Richmondshire
Brotherton	728	3.76	Osgoldcross Rural District	Selby
Brough with St Giles	801	4.77	Richmond Rural District	Richmondshire
Broughton	172	16.77	Skipton Rural District	Craven
Broughton			Malton Rural District	Ryedale
Broxa-cum-Troutsdale			Scarborough Rural District	Scarborough
Buckden	187	65.01	Skipton Rural District	Craven
Bulmer			Malton Rural District	Ryedale
Burn			Selby Rural District	Selby
Burneston	311	8.55	Bedale Rural District	Hambleton
Burniston	1,523	6.02	Scarborough Rural District	Scarborough
Burnsall	148	11.98	Skipton Rural District	Craven
Burrill with Cowling	104	7.08	Bedale Rural District	Hambleton
Burton in Lonsdale	579	6.31	Settle Rural District	Craven
Burton Leonard	690	7.27	Nidderdale Rural District	Harrogate
Burton Salmon	416	3.99	Osgoldcross Rural District	Selby
Burton cum Walden	303	31.11	Aysgarth Rural District	Richmondshire
Burton-on-Yore			Masham Rural District	Harrogate
Burythorpe			Norton Rural District	Ryedale
Buttercrambe with Bossall			Flaxton Rural District	Ryedale
Byland with Wass			Helmsley Rural District	Ryedale
Byram cum Sutton	1,434	5.77	Osgoldcross Rural District	Selby
Caldbergh with East Scrafton			Leyburn Rural District	Richmondshire
Caldwell	138	6.43	Richmond Rural District	Richmondshire
Calton			Skipton Rural District	Craven
Camblesforth	1,568	8.62	Selby Rural District	Selby
Carkin			Richmond Rural District	Richmondshire
Carleton	1,118	12.31	Skipton Rural District	Craven
Carlton Highdale	1,934	13.47	Leyburn Rural District	Richmondshire
Carlton Husthwaite	180	5.11	Easingwold Rural District	Hambleton
Carlton Miniott	990	6.41	Thirsk Rural District	Hambleton
Carlton Town	232	51.89	Leyburn Rural District	Richmondshire
Carlton	399	14.00	Stokesley Rural District	Hambleton
Carlton	726	5.86	Selby Rural District	Selby
Carperby-cum-Thoresby	200	19.90	Aysgarth Rural District	Richmondshire
Carthorpe	258	8.54	Bedale Rural District	Hambleton
Castle Bolton with East and West Bolton			Leyburn Rural District	Richmondshire
Castlelevington			Stokesley Rural District	Stockton-on-Tees
Castley			Wharfedale Rural District	Harrogate
Cattal	115	5.63	Nidderdale Rural District	Harrogate
Catterick	3,155	7.01	Richmond Rural District	Richmondshire
Catterton			Tadcaster Rural District	Selby
Catton	173	6.81	Thirsk Rural District	Hambleton
Cawood	1,549	12.17	Selby Rural District	Selby
Cawton			Helmsley Rural District	Ryedale
Cayton	2,328	9.12	Scarborough Rural District	Scarborough
Chapel Haddlesey	202	4.53	Selby Rural District	Selby
Church Fenton	1,392	11.16	Tadcaster Rural District	Selby
Clapham cum Newby	640	48.73	Settle Rural District	Craven
Claxton			Flaxton Rural District	Ryedale
Cleasby	208	7.42	Croft Rural District	Richmondshire
Cliffe			Croft Rural District	Richmondshire
Cliffe			Hemsworth Rural District	Selby
Clifton Without	5,246	3.74	Flaxton Rural District	York
Clifton-on-Yore			Bedale Rural District	Hambleton
Clint cum Hamlets	488	7.16	Ripon and Pateley Bridge Rural District	Harrogate
Cloughton	687	13.11	Scarborough Rural District	Scarborough
Colburn (town)	4,860	5.49	Richmond Rural District	Richmondshire
Cold Kirby			Helmsley Rural District	Ryedale
Colsterdale			Masham Rural District	Harrogate
Colton	212	9.51	Tadcaster Rural District	Selby
Commondale	129	13.67	Whitby Rural District	Scarborough
Coneysthorpe			Malton Rural District	Ryedale
Coneythorpe and Clareton			Nidderdale Rural District	Harrogate
Coniston Cold	203	7.80	Skipton Rural District	Craven
Conistone with Kilnsey	124	34.98	Skipton Rural District	Craven
Cononley	1,172	6.34	Skipton Rural District	Craven
Constable Burton	182	10.73	Leyburn Rural District	Richmondshire
Copgrove	137	5.21	Nidderdale Rural District	Harrogate
Copmanthorpe	4,173	7.66	Tadcaster Rural District	York
Copt Hewick	253	9.79	Ripon and Pateley Bridge Rural District	Harrogate
Cotcliffe	1,267	19.30	Northallerton Rural District	Hambleton
Coulton			Helmsley Rural District	Ryedale
Coverham with Agglethorpe			Leyburn Rural District	Richmondshire
Cowesby	131	11.11	Thirsk Rural District	Hambleton
Cowling	2,355	19.04	Skipton Rural District	Craven
Coxwold	259	17.74	Easingwold Rural District	Hambleton
Cracoe	178	8.47	Skipton Rural District	Craven
Crakehall	677	12.43	Bedale Rural District	Hambleton
Crambe			Malton Rural District	Ryedale
Crathorne	172	10.50	Stokesley Rural District	Hambleton
Crayke	410	11.66	Easingwold Rural District	Hambleton
Cridling Stubbs	152	4.12	Osgoldcross Rural District	Selby
Croft-on-Tees	466	19.18	Croft Rural District	Richmondshire
Cropton			Pickering Rural District	Ryedale
Crosby			Northallerton Rural District	Hambleton
Cundall with Leckby	128	8.32	Wath Rural District	Harrogate
Dacre	764	21.76	Ripon and Pateley Bridge Rural District	Harrogate
Dalby-cum-Skewsby			Easingwold Rural District	Hambleton
Dalton	518	6.66	Thirsk Rural District	Hambleton
Dalton	181	10.97	Richmond Rural District	Richmondshire
Dalton-on-Tees	303	16.14	Croft Rural District	Richmondshire
Danby Wiske with Lazenby	366	23.79	Northallerton Rural District	Hambleton
Danby	1,411	47.89	Whitby Rural District	Scarborough
Darley and Menwith (formerly Menwith with Darley)	1,332	11.56	Ripon and Pateley Bridge Rural District	Harrogate
Darncombe-cum-Langdale End			Scarborough Rural District	Scarborough
Deighton	168	17.15	Northallerton Rural District	Hambleton
Deighton			Hemsworth Rural District	York
Denton			Wharfedale Rural District	Harrogate
Dishforth	905	7.13	Wath Rural District	Harrogate
Downholme			Richmond Rural District	Richmondshire
Draughton	373	14.47	Skipton Rural District	Craven
Drax	488	3.92	Selby Rural District	Selby
Duggleby			Norton Rural District	Ryedale
Dunnington	3,230	12.31	Hemsworth Rural District	York
Dunsforths	224	5.69	Nidderdale Rural District	Harrogate
Earswick	876	4.52	Flaxton Rural District	York
Easby	197	9.06	Stokesley Rural District	Hambleton
Easby			Richmond Rural District	Richmondshire
Easingwold (town)	4,627	28.23	Easingwold Rural District	Hambleton
East Ayton	1,678	8.92	Scarborough Rural District	Scarborough
East Cowton	533	3.00	Northallerton Rural District	Hambleton
East Harlsey	281	12.37	Northallerton Rural District	Hambleton
East Hauxwell			Leyburn Rural District	Richmondshire
East Layton	117	7.35	Richmond Rural District	Richmondshire
East Rounton			Stokesley Rural District	Hambleton
East Tanfield			Bedale Rural District	Hambleton
East Witton	246	25.94	Leyburn Rural District	Richmondshire
Eastfield (town)	5,610	3.26	Scarborough Municipal Borough	Scarborough
Eavestone			Ripon and Pateley Bridge Rural District	Harrogate
Ebberston and Yedingham			Norton Rural District	Ryedale
Edstone			Kirkbymoorside Rural District	Ryedale
Eggborough	1,952	6.68	Osgoldcross Rural District	Selby
Egton	448	64.26	Whitby Rural District	Scarborough
Eldmire with Crakehill			Thirsk Rural District	Hambleton
Ellenthorpe			Thirsk Rural District	Harrogate
Ellerbeck			Northallerton Rural District	Hambleton
Ellerby			Whitby Rural District	Scarborough
Ellerton Abbey			Reeth Rural District	Richmondshire
Ellerton-on-Swale	183	10.02	Richmond Rural District	Richmondshire
Ellingstring			Masham Rural District	Harrogate
Ellington High and Low			Masham Rural District	Harrogate
Elslack			Skipton Rural District	Craven
Elvington	1,239	9.63	Hemsworth Rural District	York
Embsay with Eastby	1,879	18.03	Skipton Rural District	Craven
Eppleby	269	4.52	Richmond Rural District	Richmondshire
Eryholme			Croft Rural District	Richmondshire
Escrick	1,078	17.58	Hemsworth Rural District	Selby
Eshton			Skipton Rural District	Craven
Eskdaleside cum Ugglebarnby	2,238	22.17	Whitby Rural District	Scarborough
Exelby, Leeming and Londonderry	2,788	13.38	Bedale Rural District	Hambleton
Faceby	188	5.59	Stokesley Rural District	Hambleton
Fadmoor			Kirkbymoorside Rural District	Ryedale
Fairburn	819	5.69	Osgoldcross Rural District	Selby
Farlington	122	5.92	Easingwold Rural District	Hambleton
Farndale East			Kirkbymoorside Rural District	Ryedale
Farndale West			Kirkbymoorside Rural District	Ryedale
Farnham	189	4.50	Nidderdale Rural District	Harrogate
Farnhill	509	1.70	Skipton Rural District	Craven
Farnley	338	7.90	Wharfedale Rural District	Harrogate
Fawdington			Thirsk Rural District	Hambleton
Fearby	195	11.18	Masham Rural District	Harrogate
Felixkirk			Thirsk Rural District	Hambleton
Felliscliffe	283	10.63	Nidderdale Rural District	Harrogate
Ferrensby	187	1.71	Nidderdale Rural District	Harrogate
Fewston	182	8.85	Wharfedale Rural District	Harrogate
Filey (town)	6,981	8.52	Filey Urban District	Scarborough
Finghall	166	5.43	Leyburn Rural District	Richmondshire
Firby	1,859	9.47	Bedale Rural District	Hambleton
Flasby with Winterburn	207	27.89	Skipton Rural District	Craven
Flawith			Easingwold Rural District	Hambleton
Flaxby	156	10.73	Nidderdale Rural District	Harrogate
Flaxton			Flaxton Rural District	Ryedale
Folkton	535	22.22	Bridlington Rural District	Scarborough
Follifoot	578	5.92	Nidderdale Rural District	Harrogate
Forcett	155	9.19	Richmond Rural District	Richmondshire
Foston			Malton Rural District	Ryedale
Fountains Earth	197	26.93	Ripon and Pateley Bridge Rural District	Harrogate
Foxholes			Norton Rural District	Ryedale
Fryton			Malton Rural District	Ryedale
Fulford	2,785	6.24	Hemsworth Rural District	York
Fylingdales Moor			Whitby Rural District	Scarborough
Fylingdales	1,346	25.57	Whitby Rural District	Scarborough
Ganton			Norton Rural District	Ryedale
Gargrave	1,755	17.50	Skipton Rural District	Craven
Garriston			Leyburn Rural District	Richmondshire
Gate Helmsley			Flaxton Rural District	Ryedale
Gateforth	240	8.22	Selby Rural District	Selby
Gatenby			Bedale Rural District	Hambleton
Gayles	180	11.42	Richmond Rural District	Richmondshire
Giggleswick	1,270	17.53	Settle Rural District	Craven
Gillamoor			Kirkbymoorside Rural District	Ryedale
Gilling East			Helmsley Rural District	Ryedale
Gilling with Hartforth and Sedbury	534	18.27	Richmond Rural District	Richmondshire
Girsby			Croft Rural District	Hambleton
Givendale			Ripon and Pateley Bridge Rural District	Harrogate
Glaisdale	1,018	51.17	Whitby Rural District	Scarborough
Glusburn and Cross Hills	3,980	5.92	Skipton Rural District	Craven
Goathland	438	37.58	Whitby Rural District	Scarborough
Goldsborough	469	8.34	Nidderdale Rural District	Harrogate
Grantley	269	16.89	Ripon and Pateley Bridge Rural District	Harrogate
Grassington	1,126	23.48	Skipton Rural District	Craven
Great and Little Broughton	990	12.53	Stokesley Rural District	Hambleton
Great Ayton	4,629	14.51	Stokesley Rural District	Hambleton
Great Busby			Stokesley Rural District	Hambleton
Great Langton	202	12.26	Northallerton Rural District	Hambleton
Great Ouseburn	598	8.65	Nidderdale Rural District	Harrogate
Great Ribston with Walshford			Nidderdale Rural District	Harrogate
Great Smeaton	187	6.22	Northallerton Rural District	Hambleton
Great Timble	142	23.47	Wharfedale Rural District	Harrogate
Green Hammerton	675	4.87	Nidderdale Rural District	Harrogate
Grewelthorpe	498	13.95	Ripon and Pateley Bridge Rural District	Harrogate
Grimston			Tadcaster Rural District	Selby
Grimstone			Helmsley Rural District	Ryedale
Grinton	200	39.80	Reeth Rural District	Richmondshire
Gristhorpe	397	4.71	Scarborough Rural District	Scarborough
Grosmont	318	5.20	Whitby Rural District	Scarborough
Guisborough (town)	17,777	66.66	Guisborough Urban District	Redcar and Cleveland
Habton			Malton Rural District	Ryedale
Hackforth	169	9.24	Bedale Rural District	Hambleton
Hackness	221	39.11	Scarborough Rural District	Scarborough
Halton East			Skipton Rural District	Craven
Halton Gill			Settle Rural District	Craven
Halton West			Settle Rural District	Craven
Hambleton			Selby Rural District	Selby
Hampsthwaite	1,083	4.60	Nidderdale Rural District	Harrogate
Hanlith			Settle Rural District	Craven
Harmby	371	4.49	Leyburn Rural District	Richmondshire
Harome			Helmsley Rural District	Ryedale
Harrogate			Harrogate Municipal Borough	Harrogate
Hartlington			Skipton Rural District	Craven
Hartoft			Pickering Rural District	Ryedale
Harton			Flaxton Rural District	Ryedale
Hartwith cum Winsley	1,100	25.88	Ripon and Pateley Bridge Rural District	Harrogate
Harwood Dale			Scarborough Rural District	Scarborough
Haverah Park			Nidderdale Rural District	Harrogate
Hawes	1,137	76.89	Aysgarth Rural District	Richmondshire
Hawkswick			Settle Rural District	Craven
Hawnby			Helmsley Rural District	Ryedale
Hawsker-cum-Stainsacre	790	40.80	Whitby Rural District	Scarborough
Haxby (town)	8,428	8.92	Flaxton Rural District	York
Hazlewood with Storiths	191	43.92	Skipton Rural District	Craven
Healaugh	209	14.21	Tadcaster Rural District	Selby
Healey	252	70.49	Masham Rural District	Harrogate
Hebden	309	19.43	Skipton Rural District	Craven
Heck	201	6.46	Osgoldcross Rural District	Selby
Hellifield	1,426	20.33	Settle Rural District	Craven
Helmsley (town)			Helmsley Rural District	Ryedale
Hemingbrough	2,020	10.63	Hemsworth Rural District	Selby
Henderskelfe			Malton Rural District	Ryedale
Hensall	852	6.91	Osgoldcross Rural District	Selby
Heslerton			Norton Rural District	Ryedale
Heslington	4,792	12.68	Hemsworth Rural District	York
Hessay	265	5.08	Nidderdale Rural District	York
Hetton-cum-Bordley	155	18.77	Skipton Rural District	Craven
Heworth Without	2,191	3.39	Flaxton Rural District	York
High Abbotside	210	59.98	Aysgarth Rural District	Richmondshire
High and Low Bishopside (The parish council is known as Pateley Bridge Town Council.)	2,210	25.72	Ripon and Pateley Bridge Rural District	Harrogate
High Worsall			Stokesley Rural District	Hambleton
Hillam	720	6.18	Osgoldcross Rural District	Selby
Hilton	374	5.61	Stokesley Rural District	Stockton-on-Tees
Hinderwell	1,875	6.67	Whitby Rural District	Scarborough
Hipswell	5,388	10.25	Richmond Rural District	Richmondshire
Hirst Courtney	287	3.76	Selby Rural District	Selby
Holme			Thirsk Rural District	Hambleton
Holtby			Flaxton Rural District	York
Hood Grange			Thirsk Rural District	Hambleton
Hornby	238	7.39	Northallerton Rural District	Hambleton
Hornby	280	15.44	Leyburn Rural District	Richmondshire
Horton in Ribblesdale	428	69.83	Settle Rural District	Craven
Hovingham			Malton Rural District	Ryedale
Howe			Thirsk Rural District	Hambleton
Howgrave			Bedale Rural District	Hambleton
Howsham			Norton Rural District	Ryedale
Huby	1,167	18.84	Easingwold Rural District	Hambleton
Huddleston with Newthorpe			Tadcaster Rural District	Selby
Hudswell	353	32.61	Richmond Rural District	Richmondshire
Humberton	111	11.17	Thirsk Rural District	Harrogate
Hunmanby	3,132	24.69	Bridlington Rural District	Scarborough
Hunsingore	129	4.69	Nidderdale Rural District	Harrogate
Huntington	9,371	7.40	Flaxton Rural District	York
Hunton	414	7.11	Leyburn Rural District	Richmondshire
Husthwaite	404	8.14	Easingwold Rural District	Hambleton
Hutton Bonville			Northallerton Rural District	Hambleton
Hutton Buscel	320	13.19	Scarborough Rural District	Scarborough
Hutton Conyers	213	16.28	Ripon and Pateley Bridge Rural District	Harrogate
Hutton Hang			Leyburn Rural District	Richmondshire
Hutton Mulgrave			Whitby Rural District	Scarborough
Hutton Rudby	1,572	9.60	Stokesley Rural District	Hambleton
Hutton Sessay	424	19.27	Thirsk Rural District	Hambleton
Hutton-le-Hole			Kirkbymoorside Rural District	Ryedale
Huttons Ambo			Malton Rural District	Ryedale
Ilton-cum-Pott			Masham Rural District	Harrogate
Ingleby Arncliffe	304	7.65	Stokesley Rural District	Hambleton
Ingleby Barwick (town)	20,378	6.12	Stokesley Rural District	Stockton-on-Tees
Ingleby Greenhow	370	28.29	Stokesley Rural District	Hambleton
Ingleton	2,186	70.72	Settle Rural District	Craven
Irton	312	6.12	Scarborough Rural District	Scarborough

== J to R ==
Civil Parish	Civil Parish Population 2011	Area (km^{2}) 2011	Pre 1974 District	Pre 2023 District
Kearby with Netherby	204	5.49	Wetherby Rural District	Harrogate
Kelfield	497	7.24	Hemsworth Rural District	Selby
Kellington	991	6.91	Osgoldcross Rural District	Selby
Kepwick			Thirsk Rural District	Hambleton
Kettlewell with Starbotton	322	34.01	Skipton Rural District	Craven
Kexby	231	15.43	Hemsworth Rural District	York
Kilburn High and Low	227	11.37	Thirsk Rural District	Hambleton
Kildale	147	21.03	Stokesley Rural District	Hambleton
Kildwick	194	3.58	Skipton Rural District	Craven
Killerby			Bedale Rural District	Hambleton
Killinghall	4,132	11.89	Nidderdale Rural District	Harrogate
Kiplin			Northallerton Rural District	Hambleton
Kirby Grindalythe	377 (including Duggleby)	10.70	Norton Rural District	Ryedale
Kirby Hall			Nidderdale Rural District	Harrogate
Kirby Hill	391	4.90	Thirsk Rural District	Harrogate
Kirby Hill			Richmond Rural District	Richmondshire
Kirby Knowle			Thirsk Rural District	Hambleton
Kirby Misperton			Pickering Rural District	Ryedale
Kirby Sigston			Northallerton Rural District	Hambleton
Kirby Wiske	113	4.48	Thirsk Rural District	Hambleton
Kirk Deighton	484	9.14	Wetherby Rural District	Harrogate
Kirk Hammerton	538	4.41	Nidderdale Rural District	Harrogate
Kirk Smeaton	405	5.53	Hemsworth Rural District	Selby
Kirkby Fleetham with Fencote	560	15.62	Bedale Rural District	Hambleton
Kirkby Malham	202	13.68	Settle Rural District	Craven
Kirkby Malzeard	887	14.11	Ripon and Pateley Bridge Rural District	Harrogate
Kirkby Overblow	462	14.98	Wetherby Rural District	Harrogate
Kirkby Wharfe with North Milford	173	8.82	Tadcaster Rural District	Selby
Kirkby	309	7.15	Stokesley Rural District	Hambleton
Kirkbymoorside (town)			Kirkbymoorside Rural District	Ryedale
Kirklevington	1,361	13.23	Stokesley Rural District	Stockton-on-Tees
Kirklington-cum-Upsland	315	12.08	Bedale Rural District	Hambleton
Knaresborough (town)	15,441	12.22	Knaresborough Urban District	Harrogate
Knayton with Brawith	318	7.73	Thirsk Rural District	Hambleton
Landmoth-cum-Catto			Northallerton Rural District	Hambleton
Langcliffe	333	10.32	Settle Rural District	Craven
Langthorne			Bedale Rural District	Hambleton
Langthorpe	812	4.15	Thirsk Rural District	Harrogate
Langton			Norton Rural District	Ryedale
Lastingham			Kirkbymoorside Rural District	Ryedale
Laverton	260	34.37	Ripon and Pateley Bridge Rural District	Harrogate
Lawkland	231	21.61	Settle Rural District	Craven
Lead			Tadcaster Rural District	Selby
Leake			Northallerton Rural District	Hambleton
Leathley	181	6.32	Wharfedale Rural District	Harrogate
Leavening			Norton Rural District	Ryedale
Lebberston	179	5.18	Scarborough Rural District	Scarborough
Levisham			Pickering Rural District	Ryedale
Leyburn (town)	2,183	10.18	Leyburn Rural District	Richmondshire
Lillings Ambo			Flaxton Rural District	Ryedale
Lindley			Wharfedale Rural District	Harrogate
Lindrick with Studley Royal and Fountains			Ripon and Pateley Bridge Rural District	Harrogate
Linton	176	4.87	Skipton Rural District	Craven
Linton on Ouse	1,201	9.37	Easingwold Rural District	Hambleton
Little Ayton			Stokesley Rural District	Hambleton
Little Busby			Stokesley Rural District	Hambleton
Little Fenton			Tadcaster Rural District	Selby
Little Langton			Northallerton Rural District	Hambleton
Little Ouseburn	264	2.84	Nidderdale Rural District	Harrogate
Little Ribston	272	9.42	Wetherby Rural District	Harrogate
Little Smeaton	283	4.24	Northallerton Rural District	Hambleton
Little Smeaton			Hemsworth Rural District	Selby
Little Timble			Wharfedale Rural District	Harrogate
Littlethorpe	573	9.21	Ripon and Pateley Bridge Rural District	Harrogate
Litton	136	47.67	Settle Rural District	Craven
Lockton			Pickering Rural District	Ryedale
Lockwood	3,708	39.52	Skelton and Brotton Urban District	Redcar and Cleveland
Loftus (town)	7,988	41.53	Loftus Urban District	Redcar and Cleveland
Long Drax	125	6.61	Selby Rural District	Selby
Long Marston	635	22.97	Wetherby Rural District	Harrogate
Long Preston	742	14.47	Settle Rural District	Craven
Lothersdale	518	9.25	Skipton Rural District	Craven
Low Abbotside			Aysgarth Rural District	Richmondshire
Low Worsall	279	5.45	Stokesley Rural District	Hambleton
Luttons			Norton Rural District	Ryedale
Lythe			Whitby Rural District	Scarborough
Malham Moor			Settle Rural District	Craven
Malham	238	61.73	Settle Rural District	Craven
Maltby	293	5.97	Stokesley Rural District	Stockton-on-Tees
Malton (town)			Malton Urban District	Ryedale
Manfield	279	14.69	Croft Rural District	Richmondshire
Marishes			Pickering Rural District	Ryedale
Markenfield Hall			Ripon and Pateley Bridge Rural District	Harrogate
Markington with Wallerthwaite	629	16.82	Ripon and Pateley Bridge Rural District	Harrogate
Marrick	148	25.11	Reeth Rural District	Richmondshire
Marske	127	39.46	Richmond Rural District	Richmondshire
Marton cum Grafton	503	9.99	Nidderdale Rural District	Harrogate
Marton			Pickering Rural District	Ryedale
Marton-cum-Moxby			Easingwold Rural District	Hambleton
Marton-le-Moor	182	6.79	Wath Rural District	Harrogate
Martons Both	213	11.34	Skipton Rural District	Craven
Masham	1,205	6.15	Masham Rural District	Harrogate
Maunby	142	6.26	Thirsk Rural District	Hambleton
Melbecks	273	32.29	Reeth Rural District	Richmondshire
Melmerby	386	4.60	Wath Rural District	Harrogate
Melmerby	213	31.05	Leyburn Rural District	Richmondshire
Melsonby	735	11.08	Richmond Rural District	Richmondshire
Mickleby	283	16.25	Whitby Rural District	Scarborough
Middleham (town)	825	8.70	Leyburn Rural District	Richmondshire
Middleton Quernhow			Wath Rural District	Harrogate
Middleton Tyas	581	12.96	Richmond Rural District	Richmondshire
Middleton			Wharfedale Rural District	Harrogate
Middleton			Pickering Rural District	Ryedale
Middleton-on-Leven	215	21.00	Stokesley Rural District	Hambleton
Milby	184	3.06	Thirsk Rural District	Harrogate
Monk Fryston	1,008	6.30	Osgoldcross Rural District	Selby
Moor Monkton	348	12.41	Nidderdale Rural District	Harrogate
Morton-on-Swale	536	6.22	Northallerton Rural District	Hambleton
Moulton	245	12.30	Richmond Rural District	Richmondshire
Muker	249	122.10	Reeth Rural District	Richmondshire
Murton	668	3.41	Flaxton Rural District	York
Muston	339	7.95	Bridlington Rural District	Scarborough
Myton-on-Swale	152	6.77	Easingwold Rural District	Hambleton
Naburn	516	10.39	Hemsworth Rural District	York
Nawton			Kirkbymoorside Rural District	Ryedale
Nesfield with Langbar	176	7.71	Wharfedale Rural District	Harrogate
Nether Poppleton	2,141	5.19	Nidderdale Rural District	York
Nether Silton	276	25.52	Northallerton Rural District	Hambleton
New Earswick	2,737	3.17	Flaxton Rural District	York
New Forest			Richmond Rural District	Richmondshire
Newall with Clifton	147	3.70	Wharfedale Rural District	Harrogate
Newbiggin	108	26.04	Aysgarth Rural District	Richmondshire
Newburgh			Easingwold Rural District	Hambleton
Newby and Scalby	9,513	13.29	Scalby Urban District	Scarborough
Newby Wiske	181	5.78	Thirsk Rural District	Hambleton
Newby with Mulwith			Ripon and Pateley Bridge Rural District	Harrogate
Newby	214	6.37	Stokesley Rural District	Hambleton
Newholm-cum-Dunsley	192	8.61	Whitby Rural District	Scarborough
Newland	202	8.66	Selby Rural District	Selby
Newsham with Breckenbrough	128	7.74	Thirsk Rural District	Hambleton
Newsham	306	13.78	Richmond Rural District	Richmondshire
Newton Kyme cum Toulston	275	5.55	Tadcaster Rural District	Selby
Newton Morrell			Croft Rural District	Richmondshire
Newton Mulgrave			Whitby Rural District	Scarborough
Newton			Pickering Rural District	Ryedale
Newton-le-Willows	454	7.51	Leyburn Rural District	Richmondshire
Newton-on-Ouse	599	7.02	Easingwold Rural District	Hambleton
Nidd	168	4.23	Nidderdale Rural District	Harrogate
Normanby			Pickering Rural District	Ryedale
North Cowton	503	5.64	Richmond Rural District	Richmondshire
North Deighton	291	8.11	Wetherby Rural District	Harrogate
North Duffield	1,317	18.24	Hemsworth Rural District	Selby
North Kilvington			Thirsk Rural District	Hambleton
North Otterington			Northallerton Rural District	Hambleton
North Rigton	460	12.35	Wetherby Rural District	Harrogate
North Stainley with Sleningford	737	21.30	Ripon and Pateley Bridge Rural District	Harrogate
Northallerton (town)	10,655	14.80	Northallerton Urban District	Hambleton
Norton Conyers			Wath Rural District	Harrogate
Norton-le-Clay	497	4.42	Thirsk Rural District	Harrogate
Norton-on-Derwent (town)			Norton Urban District	Ryedale
Norwood	216	14.68	Wharfedale Rural District	Harrogate
Nun Monkton	173	4.42	Nidderdale Rural District	Harrogate
Nunnington			Kirkbymoorside Rural District	Ryedale
Nunthorpe	4,866	6.65	Stokesley Rural District	Middlesbrough
Old Byland and Scawton			Helmsley Rural District	Ryedale
Oldstead			Helmsley Rural District	Ryedale
Osbaldwick	2,902	2.37	Flaxton Rural District	York
Osgodby	1,248	0.90	Scarborough Municipal Borough	Scarborough
Osmotherley	668	21.18	Northallerton Rural District	Hambleton
Oswaldkirk			Helmsley Rural District	Ryedale
Otterburn	491	10.22	Settle Rural District	Craven
Oulston	149	10.62	Easingwold Rural District	Hambleton
Over Dinsdale	151	15.57	Croft Rural District	Hambleton
Over Silton			Northallerton Rural District	Hambleton
Overton			Easingwold Rural District	Hambleton
Oxton			Tadcaster Rural District	Selby
Pannal and Burn Bridge			The Harrogate Borough Council (Reorganisation of Community Governance) Order 2015	Harrogate
Patrick Brompton	167	5.01	Leyburn Rural District	Richmondshire
Pickering (town)			Pickering Urban District	Ryedale
Pickhill with Roxby	401	8.84	Thirsk Rural District	Hambleton
Picton	135	4.06	Stokesley Rural District	Hambleton
Plompton	124	7.67	Nidderdale Rural District	Harrogate
Pockley			Helmsley Rural District	Ryedale
Potto	324	8.47	Stokesley Rural District	Hambleton
Preston-under-Scar	170	10.71	Leyburn Rural District	Richmondshire
Rainton with Newby	447	6.39	Wath Rural District	Harrogate
Rand Grange			Bedale Rural District	Hambleton
Raskelf	519	17.32	Easingwold Rural District	Hambleton
Rathmell	305	15.55	Settle Rural District	Craven
Ravensworth	255	6.94	Richmond Rural District	Richmondshire
Rawcliffe	6,511	3.17	Flaxton Rural District	York
Redmire	384	29.45	Leyburn Rural District	Richmondshire
Reeth, Fremington and Healaugh	724	23.03	Reeth Rural District	Richmondshire
Reighton	407	14.70	Bridlington Rural District	Scarborough
Riccall	2,332	10.52	Hemsworth Rural District	Selby
Richmond (town)			Richmond Municipal Borough	Richmondshire
Rievaulx			Helmsley Rural District	Ryedale
Rillington			Norton Rural District	Ryedale
Ripley	232	7.29	Nidderdale Rural District	Harrogate
Ripon (city)	16,702	9.94	Ripon Municipal Borough	Harrogate
Roecliffe	238	7.54	Nidderdale Rural District	Harrogate
Romanby	6,177	8.31	Northallerton Rural District	Hambleton
Rookwith			Bedale Rural District	Hambleton
Rosedale East Side			Pickering Rural District	Ryedale
Rosedale West Side			Pickering Rural District	Ryedale
Roxby	223	26.17	Whitby Rural District	Scarborough
Rudby	396	8.21	Stokesley Rural District	Hambleton
Rufforth with Knapton	1,027	13.50	Nidderdale Rural District	York
Rylstone	160	13.10	Skipton Rural District	Craven
Ryther cum Ossendyke	241	10.34	Tadcaster Rural District	Selby

== S to Z ==
Civil Parish	Civil Parish Population 2011	Area (km^{2}) 2011	Pre 1974 District	Pre 2023 District
Saltburn, Marske and New Marske	19,134	15.42	Saltburn and Marske by the Sea Urban District	Redcar and Cleveland
Salton			Kirkbymoorside Rural District	Ryedale
Sand Hutton			Flaxton Rural District	Ryedale
Sandhutton	261	5.45	Thirsk Rural District	Hambleton
Sawley	299	11.85	Ripon and Pateley Bridge Rural District	Harrogate
Saxton with Scarthingwell	592	15.27	Tadcaster Rural District	Selby
Scackleton			Malton Rural District	Ryedale
Scagglethorpe			Norton Rural District	Ryedale
Scampston			Norton Rural District	Ryedale
Scarborough			Scarborough Municipal Borough	Scarborough
Scorton	1,012	14.20	Richmond Rural District	Richmondshire
Scosthrop			Settle Rural District	Craven
Scotton	624	4.56	Nidderdale Rural District	Harrogate
Scotton	4,810	6.64	Richmond Rural District	Richmondshire
Scrayingham			Pocklington Rural District	Ryedale
Scriven	233	3.08	Nidderdale Rural District	Harrogate
Scruton	424	8.57	Bedale Rural District	Hambleton
Seamer	566	10.71	Stokesley Rural District	Hambleton
Seamer	4,335	14.35	Scarborough Rural District	Scarborough
Selby (town)	14,731	16.01	Selby Urban District	Selby
Sessay			Thirsk Rural District	Hambleton
Settle (town)	2,564	18.19	Settle Rural District	Craven
Settrington			Norton Rural District	Ryedale
Sexhow			Stokesley Rural District	Hambleton
Sharow	556	2.60	Ripon and Pateley Bridge Rural District	Harrogate
Sherburn in Elmet	6,657	19.65	Tadcaster Rural District	Selby
Sherburn			Norton Rural District	Ryedale
Sheriff Hutton			Malton Rural District	Ryedale
Shipton	872	17.95	Easingwold Rural District	Hambleton
Sicklinghall	336	6.98	Wetherby Rural District	Harrogate
Silpho			Scarborough Rural District	Scarborough
Sinderby	137	2.26	Thirsk Rural District	Hambleton
Sinnington			Pickering Rural District	Ryedale
Skeeby	357	3.37	Richmond Rural District	Richmondshire
Skelding			Ripon and Pateley Bridge Rural District	Harrogate
Skelton and Brotton	12,848	21.65	Skelton and Brotton Urban District	Redcar and Cleveland
Skelton	1,549	9.81	Flaxton Rural District	York
Skelton-on-Ure	361	8.66	Ripon and Pateley Bridge Rural District	Harrogate
Skipton (town)	14,623	17.04	Skipton Urban District	Craven
Skipton-on-Swale			Thirsk Rural District	Hambleton
Skipwith	266	10.70	Hemsworth Rural District	Selby
Skutterskelfe	129	4.09	Stokesley Rural District	Hambleton
Slingsby			Malton Rural District	Ryedale
Snainton	754	2.45	Scarborough Rural District	Scarborough
Snape with Thorp	410	18.54	Bedale Rural District	Hambleton
Sneaton	178	19.63	Whitby Rural District	Scarborough
South Cowton	188	19.68	Northallerton Rural District	Hambleton
South Holme			Malton Rural District	Ryedale
South Kilvington	243	4.38	Thirsk Rural District	Hambleton
South Milford	2,368	18.89	Tadcaster Rural District	Selby
South Otterington	347	5.86	Thirsk Rural District	Hambleton
South Stainley with Cayton	172	8.61	Nidderdale Rural District	Harrogate
Sowerby	4,249	11.52	Thirsk Rural District	Hambleton
Sowerby-under-Cotcliffe			Northallerton Rural District	Hambleton
Spaunton			Kirkbymoorside Rural District	Ryedale
Spennithorne	198	7.66	Leyburn Rural District	Richmondshire
Spofforth with Stockeld	1,169	21.16	Wetherby Rural District	Harrogate
Sproxton			Helmsley Rural District	Ryedale
St Martin's	222	1.59	Richmond Rural District	Richmondshire
Stainburn	267	22.07	Wharfedale Rural District	Harrogate
Stainforth	231	14.96	Settle Rural District	Craven
Stainton and Thornton	1,243	4.59	Teesside County Borough	Middlesbrough
Stainton			Richmond Rural District	Richmondshire
Staintondale	341	12.88	Scarborough Rural District	Scarborough
Stanwick St John	143	5.65	Richmond Rural District	Richmondshire
Stape			Pickering Urban District	Ryedale
Stapleton	179	4.07	Croft Rural District	Richmondshire
Stapleton			Osgoldcross Rural District	Selby
Staveley	450	5.76	Nidderdale Rural District	Harrogate
Steeton			Tadcaster Rural District	Selby
Stillingfleet	405	10.47	Hemsworth Rural District	Selby
Stillington	782	8.73	Easingwold Rural District	Hambleton
Stirton with Thorlby	204	12.53	Skipton Rural District	Craven
Stockton-on-the-Forest	1,214	13.23	Flaxton Rural District	York
Stokesley	4,757	7.35	Stokesley Rural District	Hambleton
Stonebeck Down	192	49.83	Ripon and Pateley Bridge Rural District	Harrogate
Stonebeck Up	119	50.56	Ripon and Pateley Bridge Rural District	Harrogate
Stonegrave			Helmsley Rural District	Ryedale
Strensall with Towthorpe	6,047	16.09	Flaxton Rural District	York
Studley Roger	175	10.35	Ripon and Pateley Bridge Rural District	Harrogate
Stutton with Hazlewood	983	11.32	Tadcaster Rural District	Selby
Suffield-cum-Everley	241	38.84	Scarborough Rural District	Scarborough
Sutton with Howgrave			Bedale Rural District	Hambleton
Sutton	3,714	9.49	Skipton Rural District	Craven
Sutton-on-the-Forest	773	24.26	Easingwold Rural District	Hambleton
Sutton-under-Whitestonecliffe	297	8.14	Thirsk Rural District	Hambleton
Swainby with Allerthorpe			Bedale Rural District	Hambleton
Swinton with Warthermarske	200	17.28	Masham Rural District	Harrogate
Swinton			Malton Rural District	Ryedale
Tadcaster (town)	6,003	10.87	Tadcaster Rural District	Selby
Temple Hirst	117	3.01	Selby Rural District	Selby
Terrington			Malton Rural District	Ryedale
Theakston	143	3.92	Bedale Rural District	Hambleton
Thimbleby			Northallerton Rural District	Hambleton
Thirkleby High and Low with Osgodby	266	10.89	Thirsk Rural District	Hambleton
Thirlby	134	3.33	Thirsk Rural District	Hambleton
Thirn	144	9.02	Bedale Rural District	Hambleton
Thirsk (town)	4,998	12.72	Thirsk Rural District	Hambleton
Thixendale			Norton Rural District	Ryedale
Tholthorpe	282	7.17	Easingwold Rural District	Hambleton
Thoralby	145	11.59	Aysgarth Rural District	Richmondshire
Thorganby	330	11.87	Hemsworth Rural District	Selby
Thormanby	138	6.59	Easingwold Rural District	Hambleton
Thornaby (town)	24,741	9.74	Teesside County Borough	Stockton-on-Tees
Thornbrough			Thirsk Rural District	Hambleton
Thornthwaite with Padside	312	40.45	Ripon and Pateley Bridge Rural District	Harrogate
Thornton Bridge			Thirsk Rural District	Harrogate
Thornton in Craven	431	7.76	Skipton Rural District	Craven
Thornton in Lonsdale	288	30.28	Settle Rural District	Craven
Thornton Rust	107	7.83	Aysgarth Rural District	Richmondshire
Thornton Steward	199	9.70	Leyburn Rural District	Richmondshire
Thornton Watlass	224	6.01	Bedale Rural District	Hambleton
Thornton-le-Beans	255	10.76	Northallerton Rural District	Hambleton
Thornton-le-Clay			Malton Rural District	Ryedale
Thornton-le-Dale			Pickering Rural District	Ryedale
Thornton-le-Moor	425	11.79	Thirsk Rural District	Hambleton
Thornton-le-Street			Thirsk Rural District	Hambleton
Thornton-on-the-Hill			Easingwold Rural District	Hambleton
Thornville			Nidderdale Rural District	Harrogate
Thorpe Bassett			Norton Rural District	Ryedale
Thorpe Underwoods	793	16.41	Nidderdale Rural District	Harrogate
Thorpe Willoughby	2,725	1.87	Selby Rural District	Selby
Thorpe			Skipton Rural District	Craven
Threshfield	968	10.69	Skipton Rural District	Craven
Thrintoft	185	9.13	Northallerton Rural District	Hambleton
Thruscross			Ripon and Pateley Bridge Rural District	Harrogate
Tockwith	1,597	12.87	Wetherby Rural District	Harrogate
Tollerton	1,026	8.92	Easingwold Rural District	Hambleton
Topcliffe	1,489	17.01	Thirsk Rural District	Hambleton
Towton	226	3.59	Tadcaster Rural District	Selby
Tunstall	271	5.19	Richmond Rural District	Richmondshire
Uckerby			Richmond Rural District	Richmondshire
Ugthorpe	225	20.16	Whitby Rural District	Scarborough
Ulleskelf	980	5.34	Tadcaster Rural District	Selby
Upper Helmsley			Flaxton Rural District	Ryedale
Upper Poppleton	1,997	5.65	Nidderdale Rural District	York
Upsall	211	16.07	Thirsk Rural District	Hambleton
Walburn			Richmond Rural District	Richmondshire
Walden Stubbs			Hemsworth Rural District	Selby
Walkingham Hill with Occaney			Nidderdale Rural District	Harrogate
Warlaby			Northallerton Rural District	Hambleton
Warsill			Ripon and Pateley Bridge Rural District	Harrogate
Warthill			Flaxton Rural District	Ryedale
Wath	307	10.38	Wath Rural District	Harrogate
Weaverthorpe			Norton Rural District	Ryedale
Weeton	929	5.61	Wetherby Rural District	Harrogate
Welburn near Malton			Malton Rural District	Ryedale
Welburn near Kirkbymoorside			Kirkbymoorside Rural District	Ryedale
Welbury	259	9.69	Northallerton Rural District	Hambleton
Well	230	8.51	Bedale Rural District	Hambleton
Wensley	151	8.15	Leyburn Rural District	Richmondshire
West Ayton	881	8.16	Scarborough Rural District	Scarborough
West Haddlesey	214	4.89	Selby Rural District	Selby
West Harlsey			Northallerton Rural District	Hambleton
West Hauxwell	111	18.61	Leyburn Rural District	Richmondshire
West Layton			Richmond Rural District	Richmondshire
West Rounton	306	12.47	Northallerton Rural District	Hambleton
West Scrafton			Leyburn Rural District	Richmondshire
West Tanfield	636	18.53	Bedale Rural District	Hambleton
West Witton	347	15.69	Leyburn Rural District	Richmondshire
Westerdale	149	40.10	Whitby Rural District	Scarborough
Weston	209	6.12	Wharfedale Rural District	Harrogate
Westow			Norton Rural District	Ryedale
Westwick			Nidderdale Rural District	Harrogate
Wharram			Norton Rural District	Ryedale
Whashton	215	15.63	Richmond Rural District	Richmondshire
Wheldrake	2,107	18.84	Hemsworth Rural District	York
Whenby	222	19.66	Easingwold Rural District	Hambleton
Whitby (town)	13,213	9.49	Whitby Urban District	Scarborough
Whitley	1,021	7.45	Osgoldcross Rural District	Selby
Whitwell			Northallerton Rural District	Hambleton
Whitwell-on-the-Hill			Malton Rural District	Ryedale
Whixley	824	9.59	Nidderdale Rural District	Harrogate
Whorlton	597	27.49	Stokesley Rural District	Hambleton
Wigginton	3,610	7.62	Flaxton Rural District	York
Wigglesworth	379	29.67	Settle Rural District	Craven
Wighill	193	8.98	Wetherby Rural District	Harrogate
Wildon Grange			Easingwold Rural District	Hambleton
Willerby			Norton Rural District	Ryedale
Wilstrop			Wetherby Rural District	Harrogate
Wilton			Pickering Rural District	Ryedale
Winksley	142	2.94	Ripon and Pateley Bridge Rural District	Harrogate
Winton, Stank and Hallikeld	280	23.43	Northallerton Rural District	Hambleton
Wintringham			Norton Rural District	Ryedale
Wistow	1,333	17.38	Selby Rural District	Selby
Wombleton			Kirkbymoorside Rural District	Ryedale
Womersley	515	28.69	Osgoldcross Rural District	Selby
Wrelton	324	5.50	Pickering Rural District	Ryedale
Wykeham	280	18.04	Scarborough Rural District	Scarborough
Yafforth	174	5.37	Northallerton Rural District	Hambleton
Yarm (town)	8,384	4.85	Stokesley Rural District	Stockton-on-Tees
Yearsley			Easingwold Rural District	Hambleton
Youlton			Easingwold Rural District	Hambleton

== See also ==
- List of civil parishes in England
