= Local Government Commission for England (1958–1967) =

The Local Government Commission for England was established by the Local Government Act 1958 to review the organisation of local government, and make "such proposals as are hereinafter authorised for effecting changes appearing to the Commissions desirable in the interests of effective and convenient local government". Most of the commission's proposals failed to reach consensus and were not implemented, and the body was dissolved in 1967.

== Membership ==
The initial members of the commission were appointed by warrant dated 31 October 1958. The chairman was Sir Henry Drummond Hancock and the deputy chairman was Michael Edward Rowe. The other members of the commission were Ruth Burton Buckley, Bernard Donald Storey and Ernest William Woodhead. They were joined on 14 January 1959 by Professor Ely Devons and on 15 July 1959 by Robert Hughes Parry. On the death of Woodhead, Leslie Robert Missen was made a member. The last member to be appointed was Professor Bryan Keith-Lucas on 24 June 1965.

== The Review process ==
The Commission carried out reviews of two types of areas: five Special Review Areas, covering the major conurbations outside London, and seven General Review Areas, covering regions comprising a number of administrative counties and county boroughs. The commission's remit did not extend to the Metropolitan Area which was under review by the Royal Commission on Local Government in Greater London.

Review Area	Review Commenced	Draft Proposals	Report presented
West Midlands SRA	3 April 1959	4 April 1960	31 July 1961†
East Midlands GRA	9 March 1959	4 April 1960	31 July 1961
West Midlands GRA	9 March 1959	4 April 1960	31 July 1961
South Western GRA	1 December 1959	7 July 1961	5 February 1963
North Eastern GRA	15 December 1959	13 April 1962	22 November 1963
Tyneside SRA	16 January 1960	16 February 1962	16 July 1963‡
York and North Midlands GRA	25 April 1960	7 September 1962	26 May 1964
West Yorkshire SRA	25 April 1960	20 July 1962	13 March 1964
Lincolnshire and East Anglia GRA	1 August 1961	17 May 1963	7 May 1965
Merseyside SRA	29 October 1962	17 December 1965	Not presented
South East Lancashire SRA	29 October 1962	17 December 1965	Not presented
North Western GRA	29 October 1962	29 October 1965	Not presented
Southern GRA	17 May 1965	Not presented	Not presented

† An enquiry into the Commission recommendations was ordered to be held, commencing on 18 October 1961.

‡ An enquiry into the Commission recommendations was ordered to be held, commencing on 23 March 1964.

The North-Western GRA consisted of the administrative counties of Cheshire, Lancashire, Cumberland and Westmorland (except those areas in the Merseyside and South East Lancashire SRAs), and the county boroughs of Barrow-in-Furness, Blackburn, Blackpool, Burnley, Carlisle, Chester, Preston, St. Helens, Southport, Warrington and Wigan.

The Southern GRA consisted of the administrative counties of Berkshire, Buckinghamshire, Dorset, Hampshire, Isle of Wight, Oxfordshire and Wiltshire, along with the county boroughs of Bournemouth, Oxford, Portsmouth, Reading and Southampton.

No reviews were commenced for the administrative counties of Essex, Hertfordshire, Kent, Surrey, East or West Sussex, or in the county boroughs of Brighton, Canterbury, Eastbourne, Hastings or Southend-on-Sea. Parts of Essex, Hertfordshire, Kent and Surrey (including the county boroughs of East Ham, West Ham and Croydon) were included in the Metropolitan Area.

=== Dissolution ===
On 10 February 1966, the Prime Minister, Harold Wilson announced in the Commons the appointment of a Royal Commission chaired by Lord Redcliffe-Maud, to review the structure of local government in England more radically.

The reviews were formally brought to an end in 1967 by the Local Government (Termination of Reviews) Act 1967, which dissolved the commission. Most outstanding recommendations were abandoned by the government.

== The Commission's recommendations ==
The commission's reports made a number of recommendations for the completed reviews. Only some of these were carried into effect.

=== West Midlands Special Review Area (Report No.1) ===
The special review area had been defined in Schedule 3 of the Local Government Act 1958. It comprised the conurbation of Birmingham and the Black Country, and included six county boroughs, four non-county boroughs and ten urban districts in the administrative county of Staffordshire, three boroughs in Worcestershire and two boroughs and two rural parishes in Warwickshire.

The commission recommended the creation of five enlarged county boroughs in the Black Country, based on the existing county boroughs of Dudley, Smethwick, Walsall, West Bromwich and Wolverhampton. Solihull was also to be constituted a county borough, while Aldridge and Brownhills urban districts were to merge to form Aldridge-Brownhills and a new non-county borough was to be formed from the borough of Stourbridge and the urban district of Amblecote. Draft proposals had Halesowen becoming part of the Smethwick borough.

The recommendations were largely implemented in 1966, with Solihull becoming a county borough in 1964. The enlarged county borough based on Smethwick was named Warley.

=== West Midlands General Review Area (Report No.2) ===
The area consisted of the administrative counties of Herefordshire, Salop (or Shropshire), Warwickshire, Staffordshire and Worcestershire (except the parts included in the West Midlands SRA), and the county boroughs of Burton upon Trent, Coventry, Stoke-on-Trent and Worcester.

The main changes implemented in the area were the realignment of the Staffordshire/Warwickshire county boundary in the Tamworth area, with the abolition of the Tamworth Rural District and extension of the borough of Tamworth in 1965; the inclusion of a number of small urban districts and boroughs (which became rural boroughs) in rural districts in Shropshire in 1967; and the abolition of two small urban districts in Herefordshire in 1968.

The proposals to make Burton upon Trent and Worcester into non-county boroughs were not implemented : Burton had brought a court case challenging the action.

=== East Midlands General Review Area (Report No.3) ===
The area consisted of the administrative counties of Bedfordshire, Cambridgeshire, Isle of Ely, Leicestershire, Northamptonshire, Rutland and the Soke of Peterborough; and the county boroughs of Leicester and Northampton.

The review area included some of the smallest (in both area and population) administrative counties in England. Draft proposals were quite radical, as follows

- Cambridgeshire, Isle of Ely, Huntingdonshire and the Soke of Peterborough to unite and form a new county of Cambridgeshire
- to this would also be added the Ketton Rural District from Rutland, Stamford from Kesteven in Lincolnshire, and Royston in Hertfordshire
- the remainder of Rutland - the Oakham Rural District, Uppingham Rural District and Oakham urban district - would be added to Leicestershire
- Cambridge would become a county borough

These proposals were greatly controversial (especially in Rutland, which put forth a counter-suggestions to add surrounding areas to Rutland instead from surrounding counties) and the final proposals were watered down somewhat

- merger of Huntingdonshire and the Soke of Peterborough to form Huntingdon and Peterborough, to which would be joined Thorney Rural District from the Isle of Ely
- merger of Cambridgeshire and Isle of Ely to form Cambridgeshire and Isle of Ely (including Royston)
- the merger of Leicestershire and Rutland, which was to form a single rural district in a "county of Leicester and Rutland"

Extension of the two county boroughs of Leicester and Northampton was also recommended, and that the existing borough of Luton in Bedfordshire be constituted a county borough, but declined to recommend that Dunstable should be added to Luton.

The proposal to merge Leicestershire and Rutland remained controversial, and an inquiry into objections made to this part of the report was held between 17 and 26 July 1962. Objections were voiced by Rutland County Council, a number of district and parish councils in that county as well as local individuals and organisations. In August 1963 it was announced that the merger would not go ahead.

The other two mergers of administrative counties did take place, with the creation of new administrative counties of Huntingdon and Peterborough and Cambridgeshire and Isle of Ely (excluding Royston) in 1965. A larger non-metropolitan county of Cambridgeshire, covering all four administrative counties, would be formed in 1974.

Luton became a county borough in 1964, and the extensions to Northampton and Leicester were made in 1966 and 1967 respectively.

=== South Western General Review Area (Report No.4) ===
The area consisted of the administrative counties of Cornwall, Devon, Gloucestershire and Somerset; the Isles of Scilly; and the county boroughs of Bath, Bristol, Exeter, Gloucester and Plymouth.

The commission's proposals included the creation of two new county boroughs: one based on the existing borough of Cheltenham in Gloucestershire (also including Charlton Kings urban district), the other to be formed from the areas of the borough of Torquay, the urban districts of Brixham and Paignton, and parts of Newton Abbot and Totnes rural districts in Devon. Extensions were also recommended for the existing county boroughs of Bristol, Gloucester, Bath and Exeter, and alterations were proposed for the Gloucestershire/Somerset Devon/Cornwall county boundaries. The draft proposals had not recommended the creation of these county boroughs.

Of the two proposed county boroughs, only the Devon one was formed, as Torbay, in 1967. None of the extensions of existing county boroughs was made, and no alteration in the boundary between Gloucestershire and Somerset was made. The county boundary between Devon and Cornwall was realigned by the abolition of Broadwoodwidger Rural District in 1966.

A number of small urban districts and boroughs were merged into rural districts in Devon in 1967 and Cornwall in 1968, under reviews made by the two county councils.

The final proposals also proposed transferring Lyme Regis from Dorset to Devon (with the backing of the local council which made a "unanimous decision" to seek the transfer). Ambitions of Wiltshire on Frome and Dorset on Yeovil were rejected.

The proposal for a Cheltenham county borough was rejected in October 1965.

=== Tyneside Special Review Area (Report No.5) ===
The Tyneside SRA had been defined in the 1958 Act, and consisted of the Tyneside conurbation.

The commission recommended in 1963 the creation of a new County of Tyneside, divided into four boroughs. There was to be a redistribution of services between the county and borough tiers. The final proposal was published on 16 July 1963, and proposed a Tyneside county roughly as follows :-

- Newcastle upon Tyne, Gosforth, Newburn, part of Castle Ward Rural District
- Tynemouth, Wallsend, Whitley Bay, part of Longbenton
- Gateshead, Felling, Whickham, Blaydon, Ryton
- South Shields, Jarrow, Hebburn, Boldon

Following a number of objections, an inquiry was held into the proposals in 1964. Newcastle City Council wanted a single county borough, whilst the other county borough councils wished to see an area of contiguous county boroughs. The decision was put to the Minister in late 1965.

On 14 December 1965, the Minister, Richard Crossman, proposed a large single county borough of Tyneside, which would have had a population of 900,000, making it the second largest in England after Birmingham. He wrote to authorities asking for comments ahead of a public inquiry in March.

On 3 March 1966, the Minister for Housing and Local Government, being "of the opinion that the proposals of the Commission ... are not apt for the purpose of securing effective and local government in the area" formally rejected the commission's scheme, and substituted his own proposal.

The county borough was not formed, and local government in the area remained unchanged until the Local Government Act 1972 included Tyneside in the metropolitan county of Tyne and Wear, along with Sunderland from Wearside.

=== North Eastern General Review Area (Report No.6) ===
The area consisted of the administrative county of North Riding of Yorkshire and those parts of the counties of Durham and Northumberland not part of the Tyneside special review area; and the county boroughs of Darlington, Middlesbrough, Sunderland and West Hartlepool.

The commission's proposals included the creation of a new County Borough of Teesside including Middlesbrough and other adjacent boroughs and urban districts, the merger of the county borough of West Hartlepool with the non-county borough of Hartlepool and part of Stockton Rural District, and the extension of the areas of Sunderland and Darlington county boroughs.

The proposals were carried out in 1967.

=== West Yorkshire Special Review Area (Report No.7) ===
The West Yorkshire SRA had been defined in the 1958 Act, covering the western industrialised part of the West Riding of Yorkshire. The commission proposed the enlargement of the county boroughs of Bradford and Leeds, the amalgamation of a number of county districts to form three new districts, and the creation of a new non-county borough.

- Bradford county borough was to absorb part of Queensbury and Shelf urban district, but was to lose the Tong area
- Halifax county borough was to take in part of Sowerby Bridge urban district
- Leeds and Huddersfield county boroughs were to remain unchanged
- The county borough of Dewsbury was to be enlarged (and possibly renamed) to include the municipal boroughs of Batley and Ossett, most of Spenborough borough and Heckmondwike and Mirfield urban districts
- A new non-county borough was to form by the merger of the county borough of Wakefield, Horbury urban district and most of Stanley urban district
- The borough of Keighley was to be left unchanged
- The borough of Brighouse was to merge with Elland urban district and part of Queensbury and Shelf UD
- The boundaries of the borough of Pudsey were to change by gaining the Tong area from Bradford county borough
- The borough of Pontefract was to merge with the urban districts of Featherstone and Knottingley (with boundary changes)
- The borough of Castleford was to unite with Normanton urban district (with boundary changes)
- The borough of Morley was to be enlarged by absorbing part of Spenborough
- Garforth and Rothwell urban districts were to be united with part of Stanley urban district and part of Tadcaster Rural District
- Denby Dale, Kirkburton and Holmfirth urban districts were to merge
- Colne Valley and Meltham urban districts were to be united
- Baildon, Bingley, Denholme and Shipley urban districts were to form a district
- Aireborough and Horsforth urban districts were to unite

=== York and North Midlands General Review Area (Report No.8) ===
The area consisted of the administrative counties of Derbyshire, Nottinghamshire, Yorkshire East Riding, and the part of Yorkshire West Riding not included in the West Yorkshire Special Review Area; and the county boroughs of Barnsley, Derby, Doncaster, Kingston-upon-Hull, Nottingham, Rotherham, Sheffield and York.

The commission recommended that the county borough of Barnsley be reduced to a non-county borough in the administrative county of Yorkshire West Riding, and that all the remaining county boroughs continue to exist, all with extended boundaries.

It was also recommended that part of the administrative county of Yorkshire West Riding be transferred to the North Riding. The area concerned was:

- The boroughs of Harrogate and Ripon
- The urban district of Knaresborough
- Ripon and Pateley Bridge Rural District
- Most of Nidderdale Rural District

Part of the administrative county of Yorkshire North Riding was to be transferred to the East Riding, namely:

- The borough of Scarborough
- The urban district of Scalby
- Most of the rural district of Scarborough

The expansions of county boroughs proposed were

- Sheffield to take in part of the rural district of Chesterfield in Derbyshire, and Wortley
- Nottingham to take in "nearly all" of the urban districts of Carlton, West Bridgford and Beeston and Stapleford, parts of Arnold Urban District, the rural districts of Basford and Bingham, and some of Long Eaton Urban District in Derbyshire. This would have increased the population of Nottingham greatly, from 315,000 to 469,000.
- Hull to take in most of Haltemprice urban district and parts of the rural districts of Beverley and Holderness
- Derby would expand greatly with parts of the rural districts of South East Derbyshire, Belper and Repton, nearly doubling its population from 132,000 to 215,000
- Rotherham would increase its population substantially by taking in most of Rawmarsh urban district and part of Rotherham Rural District
- York would expand into Nidderdale, Flaxton and Derwent Rural Districts
- Doncaster would be extended slightly by adding part of Doncaster Rural District

Ideas not taken up included the amalgamation of the three Yorkshire administrative counties to form a single administrative county of Yorkshire and the request of Chesterfield to become a county borough. A draft proposal for an area of 100 km^{2} with a population of 34,000, including Swadlincote to be transferred to Leicestershire was withdrawn in the final recommendations.

None of these recommendations was put into force. Objections were voiced to the extensions of Nottingham, Sheffield and York county boroughs into adjoining areas. The area proposed to become part of the North Riding became part of North Yorkshire in 1974.

=== Lincolnshire and East Anglia General Review Area (Report No.9) ===
The area consisted of the administrative counties of Lincolnshire, Parts of Holland, Lincolnshire, Parts of Kesteven, Lincolnshire, Parts of Lindsey, Norfolk, East Suffolk and West Suffolk; and the county boroughs of Great Yarmouth, Grimsby, Ipswich, Lincoln and Norwich.

The Commission recommended the amalgamation of the counties of Holland and Kesteven, but the retention of two county councils for Suffolk. The report called for the enlargement of four of the county boroughs (with Grimsby absorbing the non-county borough of Cleethorpes), with the fifth, Great Yarmouth being reduced to a municipal borough in the county of Norfolk. Changes in county boundaries proposed would have led to an area of East Suffolk adjoining Great Yarmouth passing to Norfolk. The draft proposals had also suggested that Stamford and area be transferred to the Soke of Peterborough (or rather, to Huntingdon and Peterborough), most of Marshland Rural District to be transferred to Cambridgeshire from Norfolk, and that the area of Cambridgeshire around Newmarket should be transferred to West Suffolk. These proposals were toned down or withdrawn in the final proposals.

Inquiries were held on some of the proposed changes (the extension of Norwich, demotion of Yarmouth and amalgamation of Holland and Kesteven), but no alterations were made in the local government of the area until 1974.

=== North Western General Review Area ===
No final proposals were produced for the North West region, consisting of Cumberland, Westmorland, Lancashire and Cheshire (except those parts in the South East Lancashire and Merseyside special review areas).

Draft proposals were presented in October 1965, and were limited in scope. It was proposed that Barrow-in-Furness become a non-county borough, and extensions to the boundaries of the other county boroughs in the area.

The creation of a county of Cumbria to cover Cumberland, Westmorland and Furness, although floated, was not in the draft recommendations.

=== South East Lancashire Special Review Area ===
The county boroughs of Bolton, Bury, Oldham, Rochdale, Salford and Stockport and the municipal boroughs of Stretford and Ashton-under-Lyne put forward a joint proposal for consideration by the Commission in July 1960. This proposal would have seen an extension of county boroughs, and the creation of two new county boroughs based on Stretford and Ashton, such that the core urban area was contiguous county boroughs.

Draft proposals were presented in December 1965 and would have seen a new county created based on the Manchester conurbation, divided into nine most-purposes boroughs, based on Manchester, Salford, Altrincham/Sale/Stretford (the future Trafford), Stockport, Ashton-under-Lyne/Hyde/Mossley (the future Tameside), Oldham, Rochdale, Bury, Bolton.

=== Mersey Special Review Area ===
Draft proposals were presented in December 1965. They were limited in scope and proposed boundary alterations in county boroughs and county districts only.

=== Southern General Review Area ===
No proposals were put forward by the commission for this area before their dissolution. Among the representations made during this review were:

- The county boroughs of Oxford and Reading sought boundary extensions
- The county borough of Bournemouth proposed an extension to absorb the boroughs of Christchurch and Poole. The borough of Poole itself sought county borough status, while Dorset county council strongly objected to both ideas
- The municipal boroughs of High Wycombe and Slough sought county borough status
- The Berkshire and Oxfordshire Federations of Labour Parties suggested the creation of "Thameshire" by the amalgamation of Berkshire, Buckinghamshire and Oxfordshire and southern Northamptonshire. The idea was opposed by the county councils of Berkshire and Oxfordshire
- Aldershot sought county borough status on much larger boundaries including Farnham and Frimley and Camberley in Surrey.

== Achievements and effectiveness ==
The commission met with limited success with only a few recommendations carried out. Typically there was a lack of consensus for proposals and all met with some level of appeal or disdain. As a result, the reporting process could take as long as four years. The lack of executive powers meant that proposals could be rejected entirely and the reviews did not allow for suggested changes to the functions of local authorities. Throughout the period, actioning the recommendations of the commission was kept off the policy agenda because of pressure on legislative timetables with other issues (such as post-war redevelopment), lack of money to fund reorganisation and public apathy towards the issue.

== See also ==
- Local Government Commission for Wales, also created by the 1958 Act
