= Karkin =

Karkin may refer to:

- Karkin people, an indigenous ethnic group of California
- Karkin language, the extinct language of the Karkin people
- Karkın (tribe), a branch of the Oghuz Turks
- Karkin, Afghanistan, a town in Afghanistan

== See also ==
- Carkin
