= County Borough of Teesside =

Former district in northern England

Coordinates: 54°35′20″N 1°11′15″W

Teesside
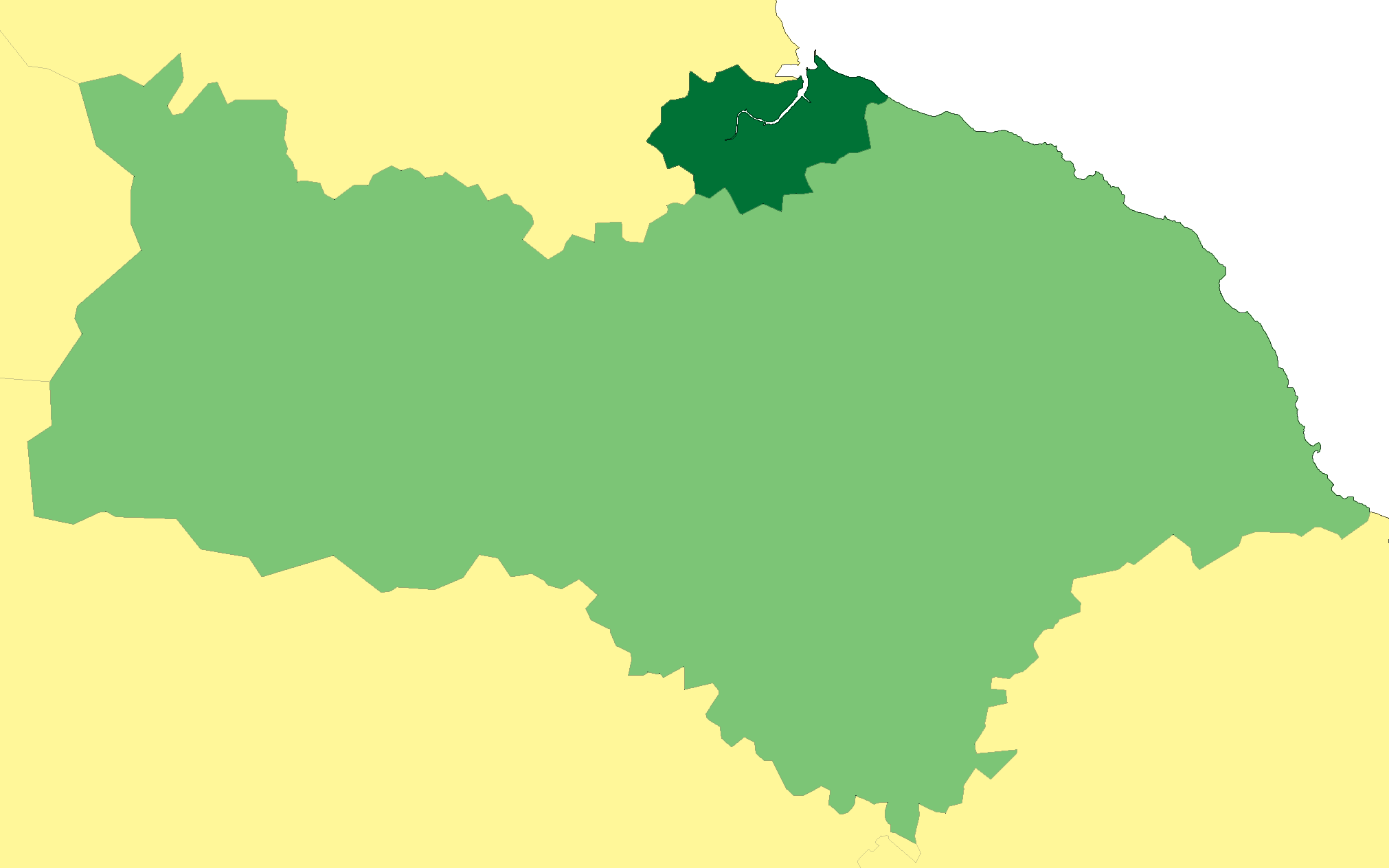
- Teesside within the North Riding
- Population
  - 1971: 396,233
- History
  - Created: 1968
  - Abolished: 1974
  - Succeeded by: Cleveland
- Status: County borough Civil parish
- Government
  - HQ: Middlesbrough
  - Motto: Progress in Unity
- Coat of arms

The County Borough of Teesside was a county borough in the north-east of England, which existed for just six years. It was created in 1968 to cover the Teesside conurbation which had grown up around the various port and industrial towns near the mouth of the River Tees. The council was based in Middlesbrough, the area's largest town. The county borough was abolished in 1974 on the creation of the new county of Cleveland, which covered a larger area, with the county borough's territory being split between three of the four districts created in the new county.

Prior to 1968 the area was governed by the six separate authorities of Billingham, Eston, Middlesbrough, Redcar, Stockton-on-Tees and Thornaby-on-Tees. Middlesbrough was a county borough, providing all local government services in its area; the others were all district-level authorities, with strategic functions provided by their respective county councils. The River Tees formed the boundary between County Durham and North Riding of Yorkshire and so Durham County Council provided county-level services to Billingham and Stockton, and North Riding County Council provided such services to Eston, Redcar and Thornaby.

The six districts were abolished and merged into a single county borough called Teesside, with some adjustments to the boundaries with neighbouring districts. For ceremonial purposes the new borough was included in the North Riding of Yorkshire, but as a county borough it was independent from North Riding County Council.

Shortly after Teesside was created work began on a more fundamental review of local government, in which it was decided that the Teesside area should form part of a larger new county, also including Hartlepool and some of the conurbation's rural hinterland. The new county was called Cleveland and came into force in 1974. The old area of the county borough was split between the districts of Langbaurgh, Middlesbrough and Stockton-on-Tees, which were three of the four districts within Cleveland.

== Demographics ==
Stockton had a population of 21,070 in 1851, being much larger than Middlesbrough which had only a population of 3,397 at the time. Middlesbrough overtook Stockton to become the larger settlement by the time of the 1891 census, when it had 81,711 people and Stockton had 80,665.

The only census carried out during the life of the county borough was the 1971 census, which showed a population of 396,233.

== Predecessor authorities ==
The River Tees formed the historic county boundary between Yorkshire and Durham. A continuous conurbation had built up around the mouth of the river, increasing greatly in population from the nineteenth century during the Industrial Revolution.

Until the nineteenth century Stockton-on-Tees was the only town to be formally incorporated as a borough in the Teesside area. Middlesbrough was governed by improvement commissioners from 1841 and was made a borough in 1853. Thornaby was incorporated as a borough in 1892, followed by Redcar in 1922. Billingham and Eston were urban districts, as Redcar had been until its elevation to borough status.

Previous urban authorities in the area that became Teesside County Borough in 1968
County	Place	Status	Dates	Notes
Durham	Billingham	Urban District	1923–1968	Previously a rural parish in Stockton Rural District. Enlarged in 1937
Durham	Stockton-on-Tees	Ancient borough	pre-1283–1835	Date of foundation unknown, first reference 1283.
Durham	Stockton-on-Tees	Municipal Borough	1836–1968	Date of foundation unknown, first reference 1283.
North Riding of Yorkshire	Eston	Local Government District	1884–1894	Absorbed Normanby 1915
North Riding of Yorkshire	Eston	Urban District	1894–1968	Absorbed Normanby 1915
North Riding of Yorkshire	Middlesbrough	Improvement Act District	1841–1853	Enlarged 1866, 1887, 1913 (absorbed North Ormesby), 1929, 1932
North Riding of Yorkshire	Middlesbrough	Municipal Borough	1853–1889	Enlarged 1866, 1887, 1913 (absorbed North Ormesby), 1929, 1932
North Riding of Yorkshire	Middlesbrough	County Borough	1889–1968	Enlarged 1866, 1887, 1913 (absorbed North Ormesby), 1929, 1932
North Riding of Yorkshire	Ormesby	Local Government District	1865–1894	Abolished 1913: North Ormesby to Middlesbrough, rest (including village) downgraded to a rural parish in Middlesbrough Rural District
North Riding of Yorkshire	Ormesby	Urban District	1894–1913	Abolished 1913: North Ormesby to Middlesbrough, rest (including village) downgraded to a rural parish in Middlesbrough Rural District
North Riding of Yorkshire	Redcar	Local Government District	1885–1894	
North Riding of Yorkshire	Redcar	Urban District	1894–1922	
North Riding of Yorkshire	Redcar	Municipal Borough	1922–1968	
North Riding of Yorkshire	South Bank in Normanby	Local Government District	1865–1894	Initially called Normanby, renamed South Bank in Normanby 1895. Absorbed by Eston 1915
North Riding of Yorkshire	South Bank in Normanby	Urban District	1894–1915	Initially called Normanby, renamed South Bank in Normanby 1895. Absorbed by Eston 1915
North Riding of Yorkshire	Thornaby-on-Tees	Local Government District	1863–1892	Local Government District was called "South Stockton" and covered northern part of township of Thornaby; enlarged to cover whole township and renamed "Thornaby-on-Tees" on incorporation in 1892.
North Riding of Yorkshire	Thornaby-on-Tees	Municipal Borough	1892–1968	Local Government District was called "South Stockton" and covered northern part of township of Thornaby; enlarged to cover whole township and renamed "Thornaby-on-Tees" on incorporation in 1892.

== Formation ==
=== Local Government Commission for England ===
Under the Local Government Act 1958 a Local Government Commission for England was established to review administrative structures throughout the country.

The commission's Proposals for the new county borough. The boundary of Teesside shown in red, and those of existing authorities as dashed lines. Yorkshire is coloured yellow and Durham in green.

The commission published draft proposals for the North Eastern General Review Area in April 1962 and a final report in October 1963. The report recommended the creation of a single county borough for the Teesside area as it:

...seemed to us necessary to ensure that the pattern of local government was such as to make the planning of development and the organisation of services fully effective, and to make certain that new development, such as houses, main roads, bridges and shops would match the growth and location of industry instead of perpetuating the patterns of the past. We were impressed by the need on Tees-side for more housing to relieve overcrowding, to replace outworn properties, and to meet the increase in population due to industrial expansion. Yet unless Teesside could be planned as a whole, it seemed to us impossible to ensure that new houses would be built in places most convenient for the people who would live in them, as it was difficult for the present ten separate housing authorities, each with their own housing list, to do other than build within or near their own boundaries...

With the southern moorland, the coast and the river, Tees-side has a splendid setting and it ought to be made worthy of its 400,000 inhabitants. This task requires a comprehensive plan for the whole area designed to secure the benefit of its port, its industries and its commerce, the reclamation of its marshlands, the building of new roads and bridges, the renewal of obsolete parts of the old riverside development, the designing of new centres and the provision of new amenities. This formidable task gives scope not for ten authorities to develop or redevelop ten towns but for a single authority to work out the details of the probable future growth and needs of Tees-side, and then prepare and carry out a single plan for the whole area.

=== Reaction ===
Reaction to the proposals was divided. The councils of Middlesbrough, Stockton, Thornaby, Redcar and Saltburn & Marske warmly welcomed the report. The two other towns due to be amalgamated, Billingham and Eston, were opposed.

The two county councils of Durham and Yorkshire, North Riding, completely rejected the commission's report. The chairman of Durham County Council, whose county was also to lose areas to the county boroughs of Hartlepool and Sunderland, described it as "the biggest menace to the north-east since the war". Sir Timothy Kitson, Member of Parliament for the Yorkshire constituency of Richmond, set out the losses to the North Riding: the administrative county was to lose about 25% of its population (reduced from about 428,000 to 318,000), and about 40% of its rateable value (down from £15.8 to £9.3 million). The chairman of North Riding County Council believed the proposals to be detrimental to the majority of the inhabitants of the administrative county.

=== The Teesside Order 1967 ===
The recommendations were accepted, with boundary adjustments, by the Government in October 1965. The main changes were to exclude most of Saltburn & Marske, and the extension of the boundary of the county borough southwards. Part of Preston-on-Tees was added to include Preston Hall, an art gallery and museum owned by Stockton Corporation within the county borough.

In January 1967, Anthony Greenwood, Minister of Housing and Local Government, made the Teesside Order 1967 to carry the recommendations into effect. The new borough of Teesside was to combine the areas of:

Abolished† or reduced‡ district	Area	Notes
County Borough of Middlesbrough†	2,886 acres (11.68 km^{2})	
Municipal Borough of Redcar† (most)	2,089 acres (8.45 km^{2})	Remaining 1 acre (0.40 ha) passed to Saltburn & Marske by the Sea UD
Municipal Borough of Stockton-on-Tees†	2,423 acres (9.81 km^{2})	
Municipal Borough of Thornaby-on-Tees†	779 acres (3.15 km^{2})	
Billingham Urban District†	2,934 acres (11.87 km^{2})	Remaining 245 acres (0.99 km^{2}) passed to Stockton RD
Eston Urban District† (most)	1,873 acres (7.58 km^{2})	Remaining 218 acres (0.88 km^{2}) passed to Guisborough UD
Guisborough Urban district‡ (part)	1,236 acres (5.00 km^{2})	
Saltburn and Marske by the Sea Urban District‡ (small part)	12 acres (0.049 km^{2})	
Stockton Rural District‡ (part)	895 acres (3.62 km^{2})	Parts of the parishes of Carlton, Elton, Grindon, Norton, Preston-on-Tees
Stokesley Rural District‡ (part)	2,600 acres (11 km^{2})	Parishes of Hemlington and Marton, parts of the parishes of Maltby, Newby, Nunthorpe, Ormesby and Stainton

The rural parishes of Hemlington, Marton, Stainton and Norton (most of which, including the town, had already been absorbed into Stockton in 1913) were all abolished as a result; the other affected rural parishes had their boundaries changed but continued to exist. One new rural parish was created at Wolviston covering the part of the Billingham Urban District which was deemed unsuitable for inclusion in Teesside and so was made a separate parish in Stockton Rural District.

Following its passing by both Houses of Parliament, the order came into effect, with the first election to the new borough council taking place in May 1967, serving as a shadow authority until it came into its full powers on 1 April 1968.

=== Inauguration ===
In a ceremony held at Middlesbrough Town Hall, the charter of the new borough was presented by Lord Normanby, the Lord Lieutenant of the North Riding of Yorkshire. Sir William Crosthwaite, who had served as Middlesbrough's mayor on five occasions, presented a new gold ceremonial mace to the corporation. The maces of the former boroughs of Middlesbrough, Stockton, Redcar and Thornaby along with the orders of constitution of the urban district councils of Eston and Billingham were handed over to the new authority for safekeeping.

== Borough council ==
The county borough was divided into twenty-six wards, each represented by three councillors and one alderman, so that the council had a total membership of 104: 78 councillors and 26 aldermen.

The wards were:

- Acklam
- Ayresome
- Berwick Hills
- Billingham East
- Billingham West
- Coatham
- Eston Grange
- Grangefield
- Gresham
- Hartburn
- Kirkleatham
- Linthorpe
- Marton
- Mile House
- North End
- North Ormesby
- Norton
- Ormesby
- Redcar
- St Hilda's
- South Bank
- Stockton South
- Thornaby East
- Thornaby West
- Thorntree
- Tollesby

The first election was held in May 1967 with the council forming a "shadow authority" until April 1968. Annual elections were then held, with one third of the councillors retiring each year. Aldermen had a six-year term of office, with half being elected by the council every three years.

Year	Members			Control
Year	Conservative	Labour	Independent and Citizen's Party	Control
1967	56	39	9	Conservative
1968	61	34	9	Conservative
1969	65	30	9	Conservative
1970	63	33	5	Conservative
1971	53	46	5	Conservative
1972	44	57	3	Labour

=== Coat of arms ===
The county borough corporation was granted armorial bearings by the College of Arms on 26 March 1968. the arms were blazoned as follows:

Argent an ancient ship sails furled pennons flying Sable, on a chief Azure on a pale Sable fimbriated and between two crucibles Argent a basilisk Or.

Crest: On a wreath Argent and Azure on a grassy mount Proper an anchor Or between two cogwheels Sable.
Supporters: On the dexter side a lion Or resting the interior hind paw on three ingots of steel Proper and on the sinister side a seahorse Argent scales, dorsal fin and tail Or, each collared Azure thereon a barrulet wavy Argent .The whole upon a compartment per pale of a grassy mount and waves of the sea Proper.
Badge: A tau cross Azure enfiled by a mural crown Or.

The ship on the shield and the anchor in the crest depicted trade and shipbuilding. The crucibles stood for the iron and steel industry. The basilisk, a fabulous creature whose gaze could turn people to stone, represented the chemical industry. The narrow silver fimbriations on either side of the basilisk were intended to represent the rails of the Stockton and Darlington Railway, the world's first passenger railway, that lay partly in the borough. The engineering industry was represented by the cogwheels in the crest. The supporters on either side of the arms were a lion for the land connections of the borough and a seahorse for the sea. Both supporters had blue collars bearing a silver wave for the River Tees.

== Teesside Municipal Transport ==
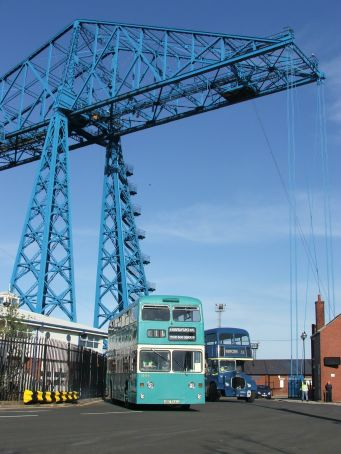
Preserved Teesside Municipal Transport L544, a 1972 Northern Counties bodied Daimler Fleetline CRL6, with Dennis Loline 99 in dark blue Middlesbrough Corporation livery at Middlesbrough Transporter Bridge

The county borough took over three public transport undertakings: Middlesbrough Corporation Transport, Stockton Corporation Transport (which also operated services on behalf of Thornaby Corporation) and the Tees-Side Railless Traction Board (TRTB). The TRTB had been formed by Eston and Middlesbrough councils in 1918, and was a pioneer operator of electric trolleybuses.

The three undertakings adopted a common livery of turquoise and cream in 1967 in preparation for their amalgamation. On 1 April 1968 the combined fleet became Teesside Municipal Transport. Teesside initially operated a mixed fleet of trolleybuses and omnibuses, but on 4 April 1971 trolleybus operation ended. A formal closure ceremony was held two weeks later.

== Teesside Constabulary ==
Teesside (Amendment) Order 1968
- Statutory Instrument
- Parliament of the United Kingdom
- Citation: SI 1968/526

Dates
- Made: 29 March 1968

Before 1968, the Teesside area was served by three police forces: Middlesbrough Borough Police, Durham Constabulary and the North Riding of Yorkshire Constabulary. It was originally envisaged that the new county borough would form a joint constabulary with the North Riding under the provisions of the Police Act 1964. The amalgamation scheme was later modified, and under the Teesside (Amendment) Order 1968 (SI 1968/526), the county borough formed its own constabulary. The new force had a strength of approximately 725 officers, comprising the entire Middlesbrough force of 350, 200 from the North Riding Constabulary and 175 from the Durham force.

== Election in 1970 ==
General election 1970: Cleveland
Party	Candidate	Votes	%	±%
Labour	James Tinn	36,213	53.77	
Conservative	Peter Coles Price	31,130	46.23	
Majority		5,083	7.55	
Turnout			72.94	
Labour hold		Swing		

== Abolition ==
The county borough had a short existence of just six years. By the time the order creating the borough was passing through parliament, the Redcliffe-Maud Commission had been appointed to completely review local government structures in England and Wales. Opposition MP Graham Page attacked the government for creating county boroughs in Teesside and other areas such as the Hartlepools and Torbay before the commission reported:

"Do the Government consider that these piecemeal orders represent dynamic policy? Do they think that these Measures – one or two orders a week presented to Parliament during farcical morning sittings at which the honourable gentlemen opposite do not bother to turn up to support their Ministers represent dynamic local government policy?"

Another round of local government reorganisation took place under the Local Government Act 1972, which introduced a uniform two-tier system of counties and districts. One of the new counties "Area No.4" was based on the Teesside conurbation. The county was eventually named Cleveland on the suggestion of several local authorities in the area.

Originally it was intended that Teesside would continue as non-metropolitan district of Cleveland. Peter Walker, Secretary of State for the Environment stated in January 1972:

"It would be wholly wrong... to divide again the County Borough of Teesside... it has made all its investment in a county borough of that size, and it would be wholly wrong to tear it to pieces."

However, the boundaries of the proposed county of Cleveland were considerably altered, with a number of marginal areas removed. Under the revised scheme, the Teesside district would have 70 per cent of the county's population, and it was felt that it would dominate the county. Accordingly, new guidelines were issued to the Local Boundaries Commission in March 1972 that was charged with drawing up district boundaries: Cleveland "should be divided into not less than four new districts with populations comparable as is reasonably practicable having regard in particular to the pattern of local government before the establishment of the Teesside county borough".

The county borough was abolished on 1 April 1974, and its area was divided between three of the four districts of Cleveland. The fourth district was based on the County Borough of Hartlepool. Teesside was divided as follows:

Wards of county borough	New district	Areas added
Coatham, Eston Grange, Kirkleatham, Ormesby, Redcar and South Bank	Langbaurgh	Guisborough, Loftus, Saltburn & Marske-by-the-Sea and Skelton & Brotton Urban Districts
Acklam, Ayresome, Berwick Hills, Gresham, Linthorpe, Marton, North Ormesby, St Hilda's, Thorntree, Tollesby	Middlesbrough	The parish of Nunthorpe from Stokesley Rural District
Billingham East, Billingham West, Grangefield, Hartburn, Mile House, North End, Norton, Stockton South, Thornaby East, Thornaby West	Stockton-on-Tees	Part of Stockton Rural District, parishes of Castlelevington, Hilton, Ingleby Barwick, Kirklevington, Maltby and Yarm from Stokesley Rural District

== See also ==
- Federation of Stoke-on-Trent
- County Borough of Warley
