= Whitby Urban District =

Former urban district council in North Yorkshire, England

Coordinates: 54.476°N 0.624°W

Whitby Urban District was an urban district in the North Riding of Yorkshire from 1894 to 1974. It comprised the present Whitby Town Council plus Briggswath (the present Scarborough Borough Council wards of Mayfield, Streonshalh and Whitby West Cliff, plus Briggswath).

In 1974 it was abolished under the Local Government Act 1972. Together with Whitby Rural District it formed the northernmost half of the district of Scarborough in North Yorkshire, containing one third of the new borough's population.

The town's coat of arms was adopted with variations into the Urban District Council's coat of arms in 1935. The motto on the coat of arms was Fuimus et sumus, Latin: We were, and we are.
