= West Layton =

Village and civil parish in North Yorkshire, England

Coordinates: 54.48335°N 1.78234°W

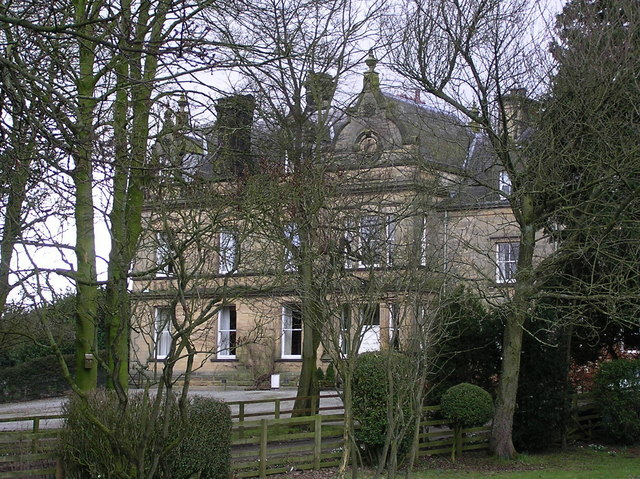
- West Layton Manor

- Location within North Yorkshire
- OS grid reference: NZ141099
- Unitary authority: North Yorkshire
- Ceremonial county: North Yorkshire
- Region: Yorkshire and the Humber
- Country: England
- Sovereign state: United Kingdom
- Post town: Richmond
- Postcode district: DL11
- Police: North Yorkshire
- Fire: North Yorkshire
- Ambulance: Yorkshire
- UK Parliament: Richmond and Northallerton

West Layton is a village and civil parish in the county of North Yorkshire, England, close to the border with County Durham and a few miles west of Darlington.

== History ==
The village is mentioned in the Domesday Book as belonging to Count Alan, and as having 16 villagers, a 12-acre (4.9 ha) meadow, one fishery and two churches. The village was formerly in the wapentake of Gilling West and the parish of Hutton Magna. From 1974 to 2023 it was part of the district of Richmondshire, it is now administered by the unitary North Yorkshire Council. The name of Layton is historically recorded as Laston, Lastun and Latton, and means the town where the leeks are grown.

The population of the civil parish taken at the 2011 Census was less than 100. Details are included with the parish of East Layton. In 2015, North Yorkshire County Council estimated that the population of the village was 40.
