= Middlesbrough Borough Police =

Defunct police force

Middlesbrough Borough Police, sometimes referred to as Middlesbrough Constabulary, was the police force of Middlesbrough, England, established in 1853. On 1 April 1968, the force was amalgamated into Teesside Constabulary, which itself became part of Cleveland Constabulary in 1974.

In 1934, the force had a strength of one Chief Constable, one Chief Inspector, six Inspectors, twenty Sergeants, 136 Constables, three Matrons, and eight civilian staff.

== Chief constables ==
- Henry Riches, 1902–1930
- Donald Heald, 1932–?
- Ralph Davison, 1957–1968
