= Settle Rural District =

Former local government area of North Yorkshire, England

Coordinates: 54.072°N 2.282°W

Settle Rural District was an administrative district in the West Riding of Yorkshire, England. The rural district was named after the town of Settle and included the civil parishes of Bentham, Clapham cum Newby, Malham, Settle, Stainforth, Austwick, Giggleswick, Ingleton and Horton.

The rural district was disbanded in local government reorganisation in 1974 and transferred to the Craven district of North Yorkshire.

== Population ==
Population of Settle Rural District 1911 – 1971
1901	1911	1921	1931	1939	1951	1961	1971
14,319	14,901	15,373	14,746	15,217	14,286	13,824	13,992
