= Wharfedale Rural District =

Former local government area in the UK

Coordinates: 53.957°N 1.652°W

- History
  - Created: 1894
  - Abolished: 1974
- Status: Rural district
- Government: Wharfedale Rural District Council

Wharfedale was a rural district in the West Riding of Yorkshire from 1894 to 1974. It comprised the northern side of lower Wharfedale, the lower Washburn Valley and several parishes between Leeds and the River Wharfe. Until 1937 it also included a detached part, the parish of Esholt north of Bradford.

It contained the following civil parishes:

- Adel cum Eccup (1894–1928) transferred to County Borough of Leeds
- Alwoodley (1894–1928) transferred to County Borough of Leeds
- Arthington
- Askwith
- Blubberhouses
- Bramhope
- Carlton
- Castley
- Denton
- Esholt (1894–1937) transferred to County Borough of Bradford
- Farnley
- Fewston
- Great Timble
- Hawksworth (1894–1937) transferred to Aireborough Urban District
- Leathley
- Lindley
- Little Timble
- Menston (1894–1937) transferred to Aireborough Urban District
- Middleton
- Nesfield with Langbar
- Newell with Clifton
- Norwood
- Pool
- Stainburn
- Weston

It was abolished in 1974 under the Local Government Act 1972, and split between two new districts. The parishes of Arthington, Bramhope, Carlton and Pool went to the metropolitan district of the City of Leeds in West Yorkshire, with the rest becoming part of the Borough of Harrogate in North Yorkshire.
