= Skipton Rural District =

Former local government area in the UK

Coordinates: 53.961°N 2.012°W

Skipton was a rural district in the West Riding of Yorkshire from 1894 to 1974. It was named after Skipton, which constituted an urban district on its southern border.

The district was expanded in 1937 by taking in the parishes of Steeton with Eastburn and Sutton from the disbanded Keighley Rural District.

It was abolished in 1974, under the Local Government Act 1972, and was split three ways. The parishes of Addingham, Kildwick and Steeton with Eastburn went to the Metropolitan Borough of Bradford in West Yorkshire; the parishes of Bracewell, Brogden and Salterforth became part of the Pendle district of Lancashire, with the rest going to the Craven district of North Yorkshire.
