= Irton =

Village and civil parish in North Yorkshire, England

Coordinates: 54.243000°N 0.450800°W

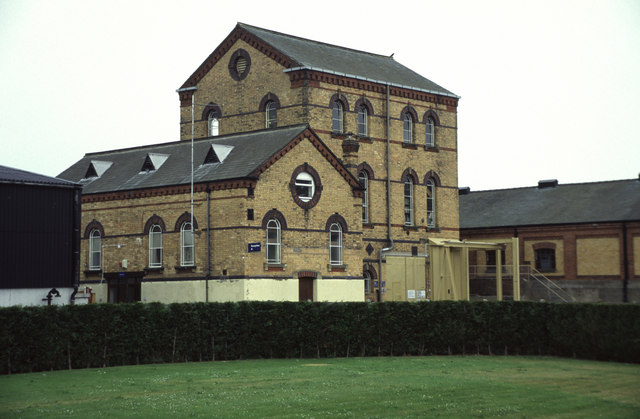
- Irton Pumping Station

- Location within North Yorkshire
- Population: 310 (2015 NYCC)
- OS grid reference: TA010841
- Civil parish: Irton
- Unitary authority: North Yorkshire
- Ceremonial county: North Yorkshire
- Region: Yorkshire and the Humber
- Country: England
- Sovereign state: United Kingdom
- Post town: SCARBOROUGH
- Postcode district: YO12
- Police: North Yorkshire
- Fire: North Yorkshire
- Ambulance: Yorkshire
- UK Parliament: Scarborough and Whitby

Irton is a village and civil parish, 3 miles (5 km) south-west of Scarborough in the county of North Yorkshire, England. According to the 2011 UK census, Irton parish had a population of 312, a decrease on the 2001 UK census figure of 332. In 2015, North Yorkshire County Council estimated that the parish had a population of 310.

== History ==
Irton is mentioned in the Domesday Book as belonging to William Percy, and within the old wapentake of Dic. It is recorded as Iretune, which is partly from Old Norse, meaning the farm of the Irishmen (or Irishman). It has been recorded over the years with named variations such as I-,yrton, Hyrton, and Urton.

Historically, the village was a township in the Parish of Seamer, within the wapentake of Pickering Lythe (the later name for the wapentake of Dic). The village and surrounding area became their own separate civil parish after 1866 in the old North Riding of Yorkshire, and in 1974, it was moved from Scarborough Rural District to the Borough of Scarborough as a standalone parish. From 1974 to 2023 it was part of the Borough of Scarborough, it is now administered by the unitary North Yorkshire Council. The village is represented in the UK Parliament as part of the Scarborough and Whitby Constituency.

Part of the village clustered around Main Street was designated as a conservation in 1984. The village is host to a waterworks which takes water from a local aquifer via a borehole dug 428 feet (130 m) deep. The plant was built in the 1880s to provide water to the Scarborough area. The plant had a siding off the now closed Forge Valley, which supplied coal for the boilers producing steam to work the beam engines pumping water.

== Population ==
Population of Irton 1811–2015
| 1811 | 1821 | 1831 | 1841 | 1851 | 1861 | 1871 | 1881 | 1891 | 1901 | 1911 | 1921 | 1931 | 1951 | 1961 | 1971 | 2001 | 2011 | 2015 |
|---|---|---|---|---|---|---|---|---|---|---|---|---|---|---|---|---|---|---|
| 94 | 105 | 107 | 134 | 118 | 125 | 124 | 148 | 163 | 148 | 140 | 182 | 133 | 200 | 245 | 298 | 332 | 312 | 310‡ |

‡ Estimated.
