= North Riding of Yorkshire =

Third of a historic county in England

Coordinates: 54°20′16″N 1°25′43″W

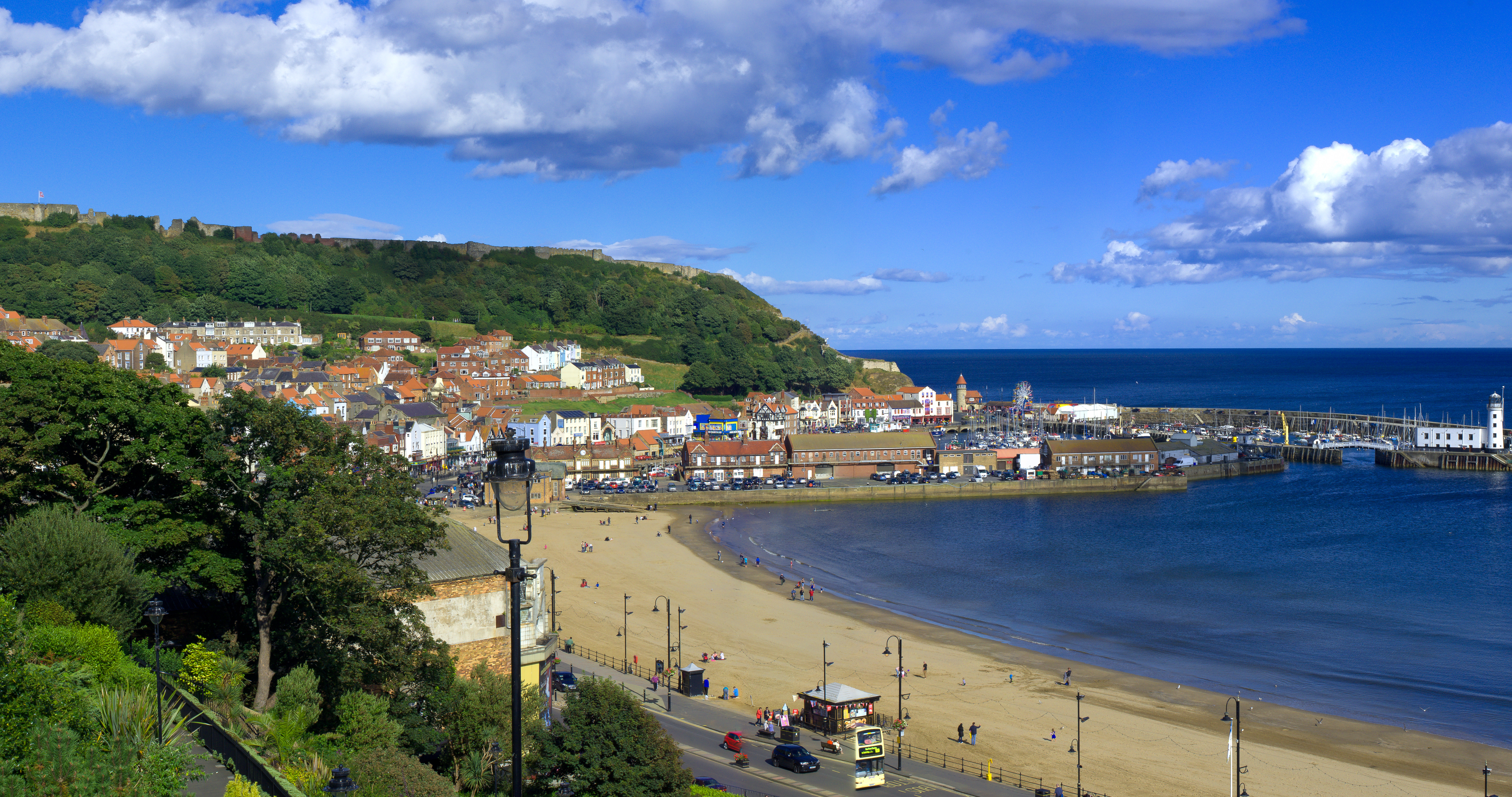
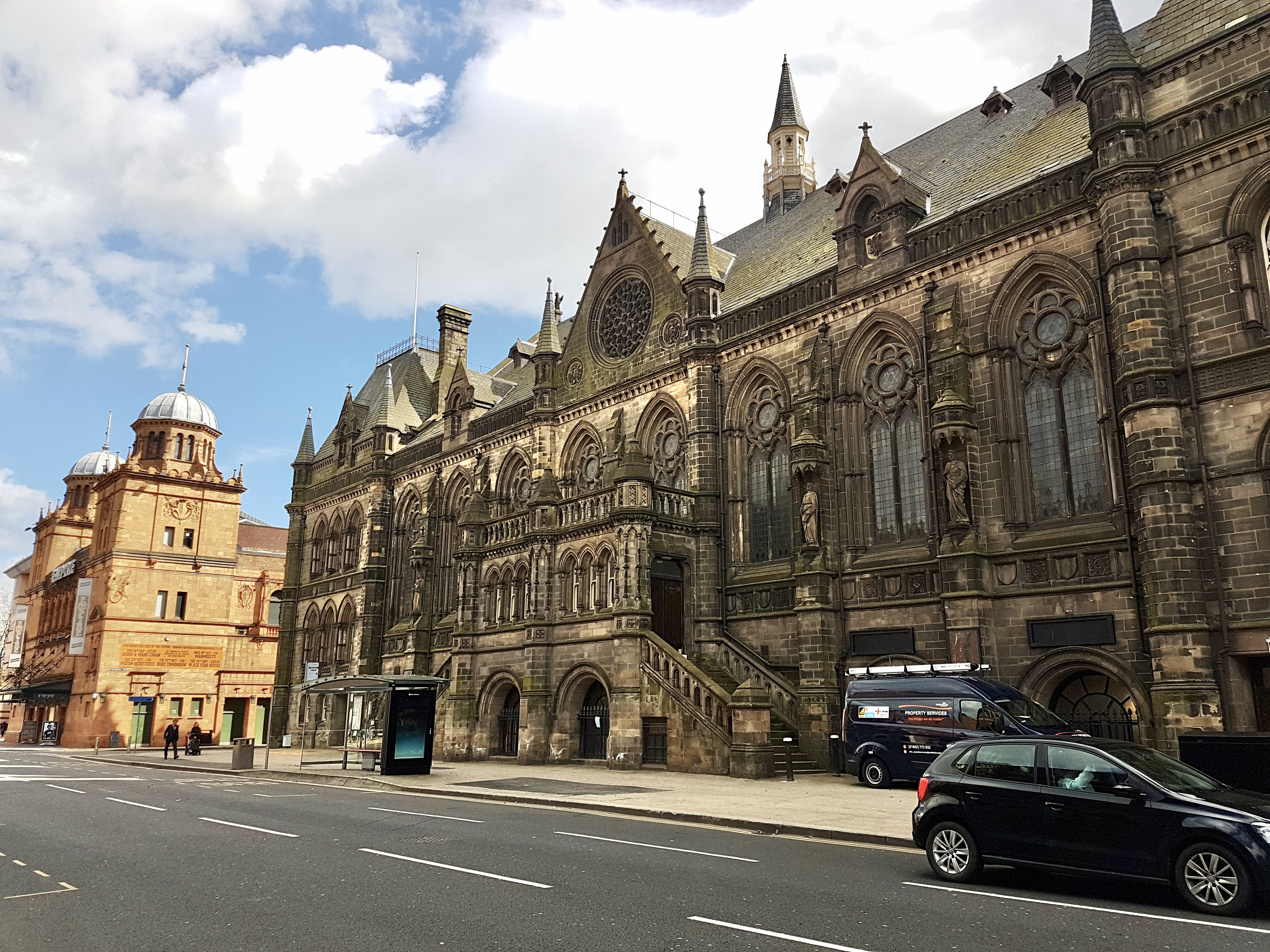
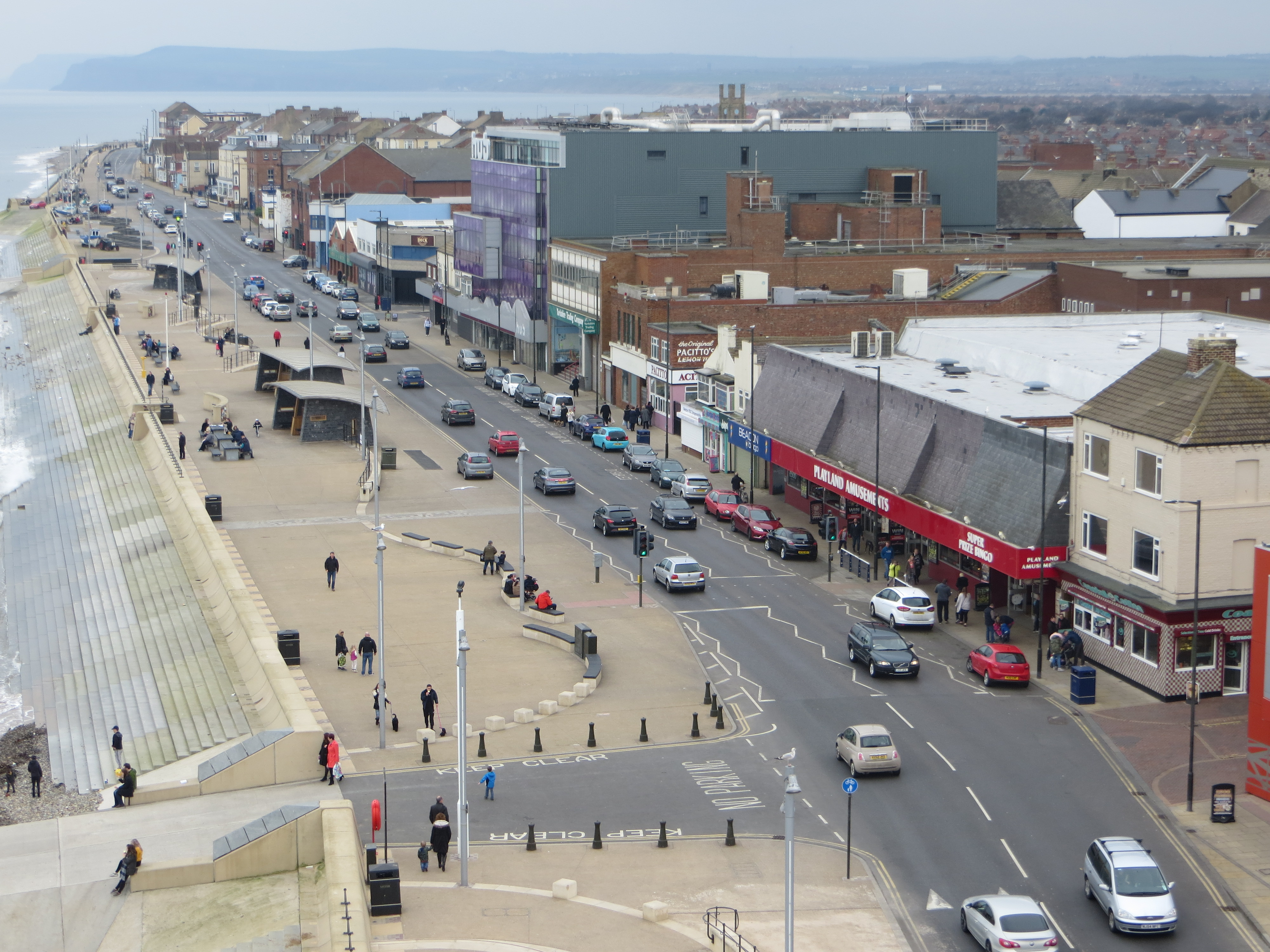
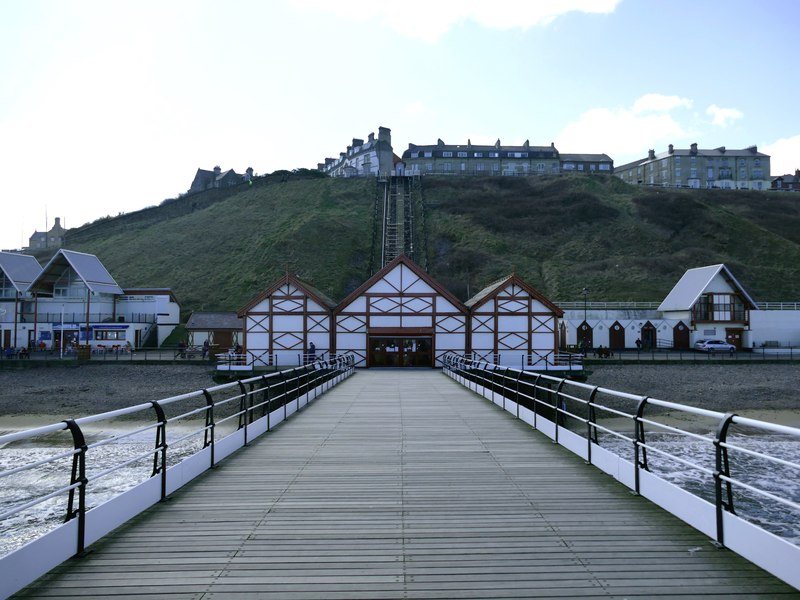
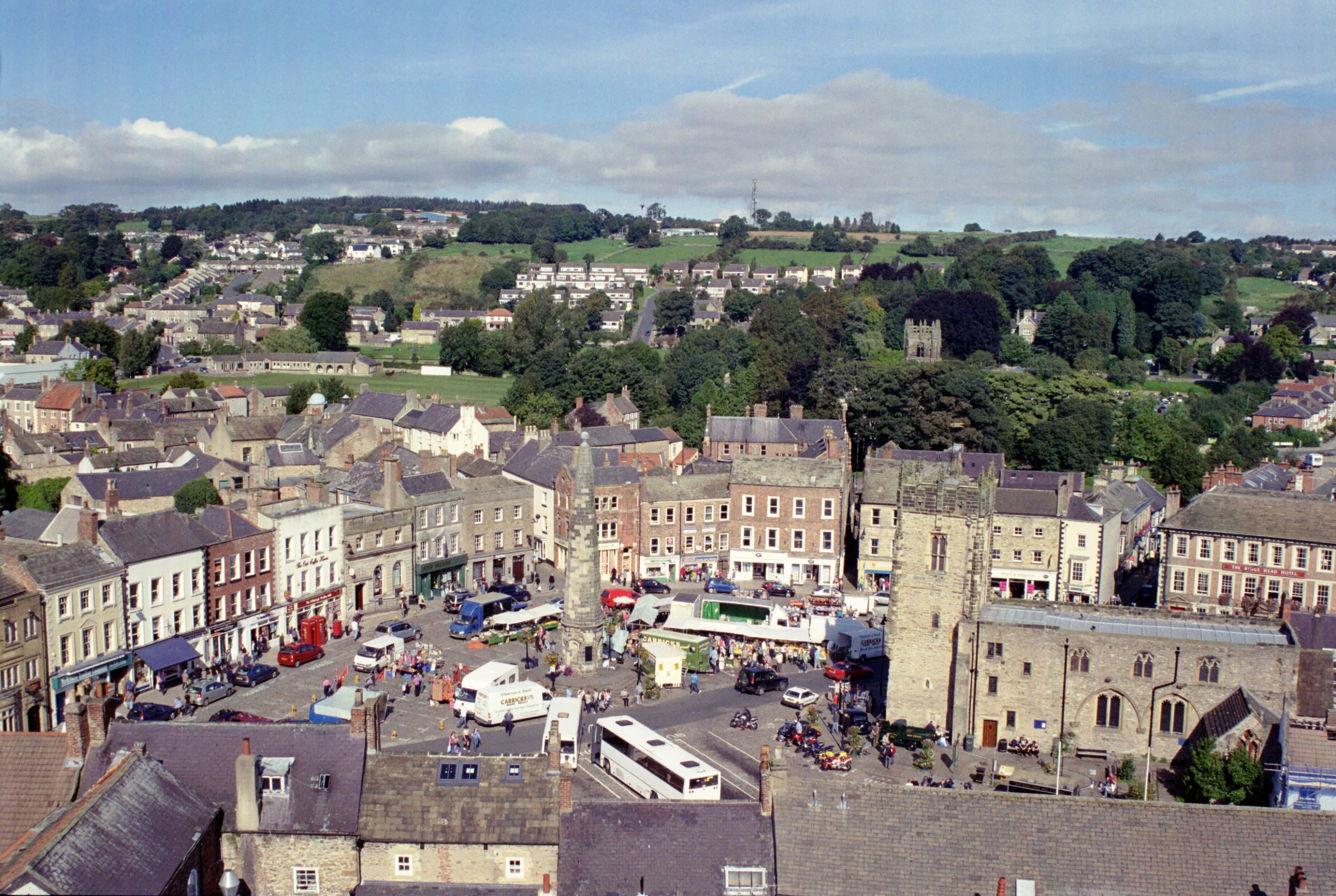
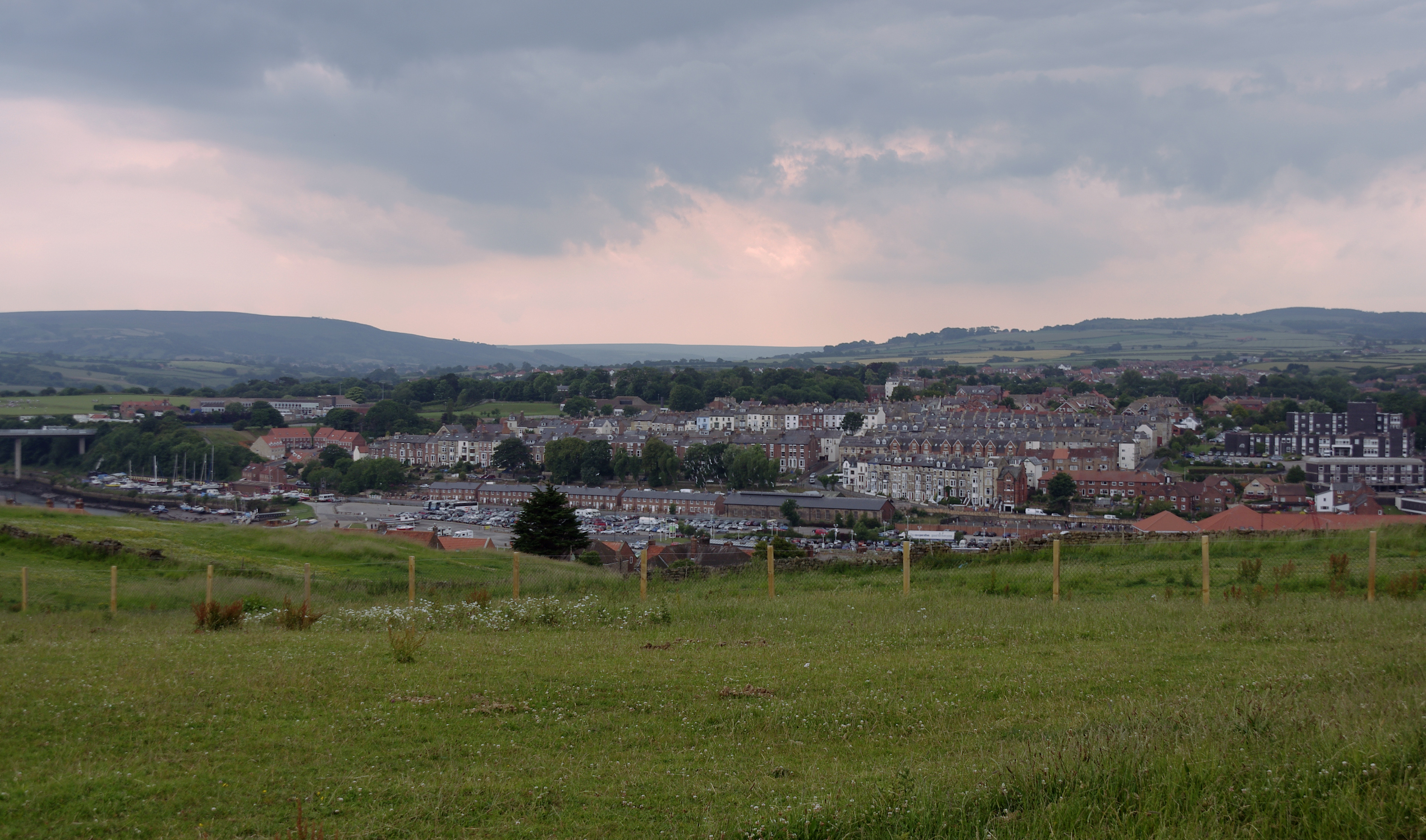
- Scarborough Middlesbrough Redcar Saltburn Richmond Whitby

- North Riding shown within England
- Area
  - 1911: 1,359,600 acres (5,502 km^{2})
  - 1961: 1,376,607 acres (5,570.93 km^{2})
- Population
  - 1901: 286,036
  - 1971: 329,410
- History
  - Created: Ancient (as a county in 1889)
  - Abolished: 1974
  - Succeeded by: North Yorkshire; Cleveland (1974–1996); County Durham
- Status: Riding then Administrative county
- Chapman code: NRY
- Government: North Riding County Council (1889–1974)
  - HQ: Northallerton
- Coat of arms of North Riding County Council

The North Riding of Yorkshire was a subdivision of Yorkshire, England, alongside York, the East Riding and West Riding. The riding's highest point was at Mickle Fell at 2,585 ft (788 m).

From the Restoration it was used as a lieutenancy area, having been previously part of the Yorkshire lieutenancy. Each riding was treated as a county for many purposes, such as quarter sessions. An administrative county, based on the riding, was created with a county council in 1889 under the Local Government Act 1888. In 1974 both the administrative county and the North Riding of Yorkshire lieutenancy were abolished, replaced in most of the riding by the non-metropolitan county and lieutenancy of North Yorkshire, and in the north-west by County Durham.

== History ==
Archives from 1808 record that the "north-riding of York-shire" had once consisted of "fifty-one lordships" owned by Robert the Bruce. During the English Civil War, the North Riding predominantly supported the royalist cause, while other areas of Yorkshire tended to support the parliamentarians.

== Governance ==
=== Administrative county ===
The County of York, North Riding administrative county was formed in 1889. In 1894 it was divided into municipal boroughs, urban districts and rural districts under the Local Government Act 1894. Middlesbrough had already been incorporated as a municipal borough in 1853 and formed a county borough, exempt from county council control, from 1889. Richmond and Scarborough had been incorporated as municipal boroughs in 1835, with Thornaby-on-Tees added in 1892.

The urban districts in 1894 were Eston, Guisborough, Hinderwell, Kirkleatham, Kirklington cum Upsland, Loftus, Malton, Masham, Northallerton, Pickering, Redcar, Saltburn and Marske by the Sea, Scalby, Skelton and Brotton and Whitby. In 1922 Redcar was incorporated as a borough.

The rural districts in 1894 were Aysgarth, Bedale, Croft, Easingwold, Flaxton, Guisborough, Helmsley, Kirkby Moorside, Leyburn, Malton, Masham, Middlesbrough, Northallerton, Pickering, Reeth, Richmond, Scarborough, Startforth, Stokesley, Thirsk, Wath and Whitby.

County Review Orders reduced the number of urban and rural districts in the county:

- Hinderwell urban district was absorbed by Whitby rural district in 1932
- A new Saltburn and Marske by the Sea urban district was formed from Saltburn by the Sea urban district and part of Guisborough rural district. the remainder of Guisborough RD passed to Loftus urban district and Whitby rural district in 1932
- Kirklington cum Upsland urban district was absorbed by Bedale rural district in 1934
- Masham urban district was redesignated as Masham rural district in 1934

In 1968 a new Teesside county borough was created, taking in Middlesbrough and parts of the administrative areas of Durham and North Riding councils. From the North Riding came the Redcar Borough and Saltburn-Marske Urban District, Thornaby-on-Tees Borough (formerly part of the Stokesley's rural district) and Eston's urban district. Tees-Side also included parts north of the River Tees historically in Durham. The area was associated with the North Riding for lieutenancy and other purposes.

The main towns of the riding (before its authority was abolished) were Middlesbrough, Redcar, Whitby, Scarborough and Northallerton.

=== Post-1974 ===
Official flag of the North Riding (2013)

In 1974 the North Riding authorities were abolished. The majority of its former area became North Yorkshire, with the addition of northern West Riding and north-western pre-1974 East Riding. The former Teesside county borough and areas around it became part of Cleveland county while the Startforth Rural District came under County Durham.

Most of the former riding is now represented by the larger North Yorkshire District. The boroughs of Middlesbrough and Redcar and Cleveland are wholly inside the former North Riding's area. They are also some parts of the former area in the council areas of Stockton-on-Tees, York and County Durham.

== Proposed resurrection of name ==
On three occasions a re-use of the name of the North Riding for local government purposes has been considered. During the 1990s UK local government reform, the Banham Commission suggested uniting Richmondshire, Hambleton, Ryedale and Scarborough districts in a new unitary authority called North Riding of Yorkshire. Later, the government proposed renaming the ceremonial county of North Yorkshire the North Riding of Yorkshire. This was deemed inappropriate and rejected, after a "chorus of disapprobation".

During a further local government review in the 2000s as part of the preparations for the regional assembly referendums, a unitary authority with the name North Riding of Yorkshire, consisting of Richmondshire, Hambleton, Ryedale and Scarborough was again suggested. However, the Commission withdrew this in favour of two unitary authorities, one for Hambleton and Richmondshire, the other for Ryedale and Scarborough.

== Ancient divisions ==
Yorkshire was divided into wapentakes within each riding.

=== Later wapentakes ===
There were 13 wapentakes when the system became disused after the 19th century:

1. Gilling West
2. Hang West
3. Gilling East
4. Hang East
5. Allertonshire
6. Hallikeld
7. Langbaurgh West

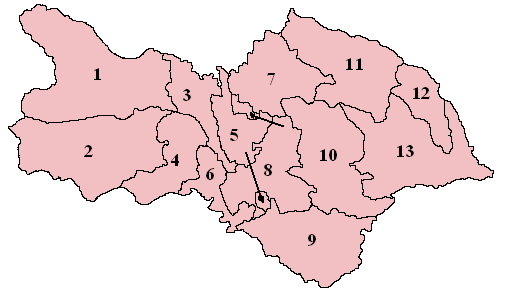
Wapentakes

8. Birdforth
9. Bulmer
10. Ryedale
11. Langbaurgh East
12. Whitby Strand
13. Pickering Lythe

=== Domesday ===
In the Domesday Book of 1086 they were eight wapentakes, these were as follows:

| Domesday name | Later name | Also known as | Other post Domesday status |
|---|---|---|---|
| Aluretune | Allertonshire | Shire of Northallerton | Liberty |
| Bolesford | Bulmer | Galtres and Bulmershire | |
| Dic | Pickering Lythe | Vale of Pickering | Honour |
| Dic | Whitby Strand (Soke of Hackness) | Whitby Strand | Liberty |
| Langbaurgh | Whitby Strand (Whitby) | Whitby Strand | Liberty |
| Langbaurgh | Langbaurgh East & Langbaurgh West | Cleveland | Liberty |
| Gerlestre | Birdforth | Vale of Mowbray | Bailiwick |
| Count Allen's Castilery | Hang East & Hang West | Hangshire | Wapentakes in the Honour of Richmond |
| Count Allen's Castilery | Gilling East & Gilling West | Gillingshire, the west wapentake also known as Wensleydale or Swaledale | Wapentakes in the Honour of Richmond |
| Hallikeldshire | Hallikeld | | Wapentakes in the Honour of Richmond |
| Maneshou | Ryedale | Holdlythe | |

== See also ==
- List of Lord Lieutenants of the North Riding
- List of High Sheriffs of North Yorkshire
- Custos Rotulorum of the North Riding of Yorkshire – List of Keepers of the Rolls
