= Stokesley Rural District =

Former local government area in the UK

Coordinates: 54.471°N 1.191°W

Stokesley was a rural district in the North Riding of Yorkshire from 1894 to 1974. It was named after the town of Stokesley, which it contained.

The district was enlarged in 1932 when it took in part of the Middlesbrough Rural District. It lost parts in 1968 with the creation of the Teesside county borough.

In 1974 the district was abolished under the Local Government Act 1972. It was split three ways, with the northern parts going to the boroughs of Stockton-on-Tees and Middlesbrough in the new county of Cleveland, and the rest becoming part of the Hambleton District of North Yorkshire.

The parishes that went to Stockton were: Castlelevington, Hilton, Ingleby Barwick, Kirklevington, Maltby and Yarm, whilst Nunthorpe went to Middlesbrough.
