= Croft Rural District =

Former local government area in the UK

Coordinates: 54.495°N 1.458°W

Croft was a rural district in the North Riding of Yorkshire from 1894 to 1974.

It was created under the Local Government Act 1894 from that part of the Darlington rural sanitary district which was in the North Riding (the rest forming Darlington Rural District in County Durham). It was named after Croft-on-Tees.

It was abolished under the Local Government Act 1972 in 1974. The parishes of Girsby and Over Dinsdale went to form part of the new North Yorkshire Hambleton District, with the rest going to the Richmondshire district.
