= Selby Rural District =

Former local government area in the UK

Coordinates: 53.777°N 1.079°W

Selby was a rural district in the West Riding of Yorkshire from 1894 to 1974.

It was formed under the Local Government Act 1894 (56 & 57 Vict. c. 73) from that part of the Selby rural sanitary district which was in the West Riding (the East Riding parts going on to form the Riccal Rural District).

It remained largely unchanged, although it lost the parishes of Biggin and Little Fenton to Tadcaster Rural District on 1 April 1937.

It was abolished in 1974 under the Local Government Act 1972, going to form part of an enlarged district of Selby, in North Yorkshire.
