= Wildon Grange =

Civil parish in North Yorkshire, England

Coordinates: 54.195°N 1.210°W

- Civil parish
- OS grid reference: SE515780
- Civil parish: Wildon Grange
- Unitary authority: North Yorkshire
- Ceremonial county: North Yorkshire
- Region: Yorkshire and the Humber
- Country: England
- Sovereign state: United Kingdom
- Post town: YORK
- Postcode district: YO61
- Police: North Yorkshire
- Fire: North Yorkshire
- Ambulance: Yorkshire

Wildon Grange is a civil parish in the county of North Yorkshire, England.

== History ==
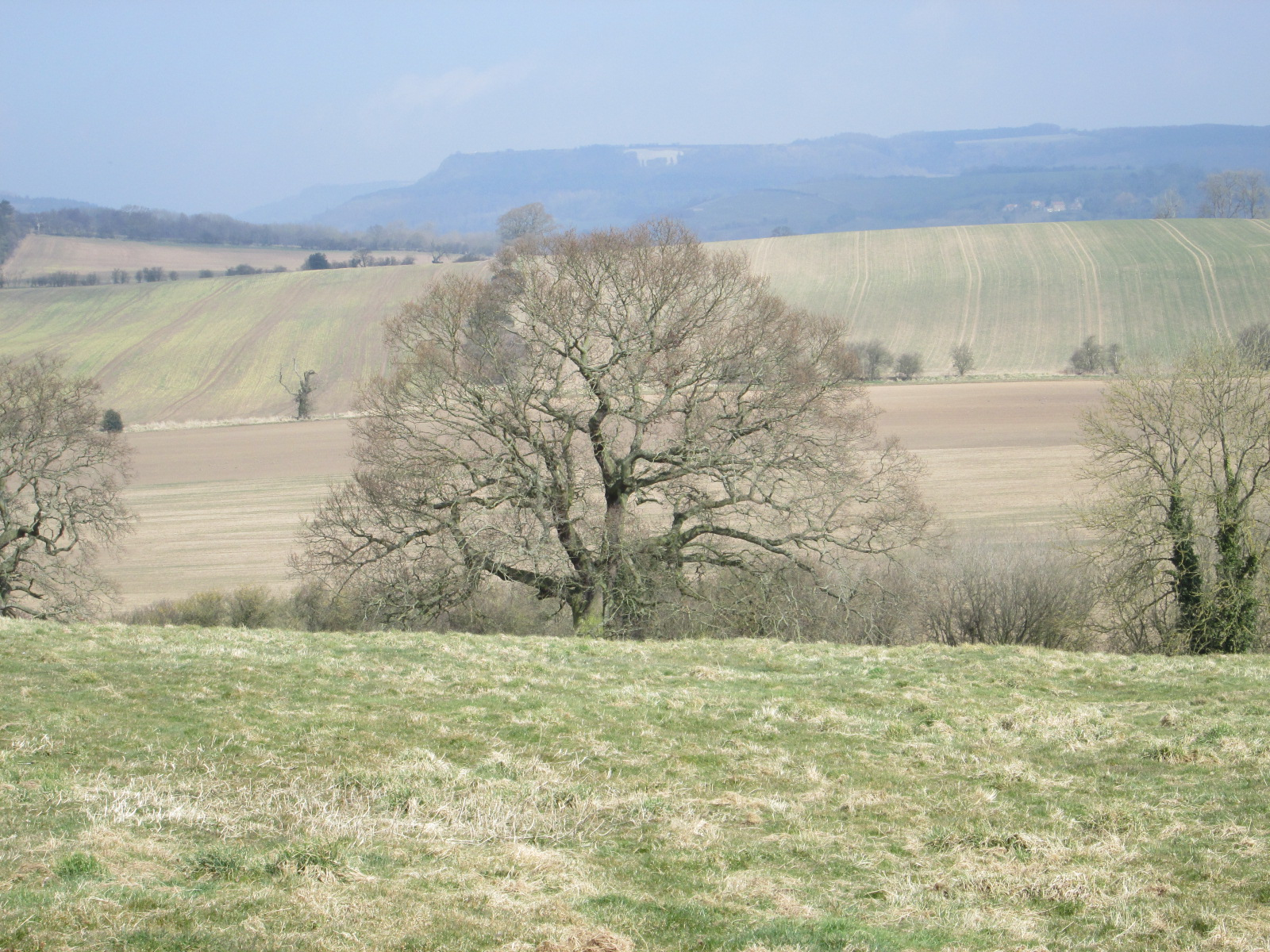
The top of Wildon Hill looking north towards the Kilburn White Horse

Wildon Grange is first recorded in 1138 as Wyldon, meaning Wild Hill. The farming area of Wildon Grange was originally a possession of the monks of nearby Byland Abbey, being granted to them by Roger de Mowbray c. 1140. Until 1866, Wildon Grange was a township that was mostly part of the Ecclesiastical parish of Coxwold, (Note: An ecclesiastical report from 1665 detailed how a man named Valentine Johnson, went before the Bishop of Durham accused of holding Quaker meetings in his house at Wildon Grange. The land was listed as being in the parish of Crayke, despite being located geographically between Kilburn and Coxwold.) in the wapentake of Birdforth, in the North Riding of Yorkshire. Since 1866, it has been its own civil parish, and in 1974 was transferred to North Yorkshire. From 1974 to 2023 it was part of the Hambleton District, it is now administered by the unitary North Yorkshire Council.

The parish covers an area of 740 acres (298 hectares), and is part of the Hillside & Raskelf Ward for local elections, and Thirsk and Malton constituency for Parliamentary representation. The current grange is 1.25 miles (2.01 km) north-west of Coxwold and 7 miles (11 km) east of Thirsk. Whinny Bank Road in the east of the parish, is the boundary into the North York Moors National Park, and also carries National Cycle Route 65, which runs from Hornsea to Middlesbrough.

In the south of the parish is Wildon Hill, which is 302 feet (92 m) above sea level. Evidence of quarrying is in existence on the hill, which has shown the underlying ground to be composed of sandstone and limestone.

Population of Wildon Grange 1801–2015
1801	1811	1821	1831	1841	1851	1861	1871	1881	1891	1901	1911	1921	1931	1951	1961	1971	2011	2015
28	23	29	27	21	21	27	23	21	23	31	24	46	25	17	15	15	20 (Note: Estimated population.)	30 (Note: Estimated population.)
