= Whitby Rural District =

Former district in the North Riding of Yorkshire, England

Coordinates: 54.460°N 0.613°W

Whitby Rural District was a rural district governed from Whitby for its surrounding area in the North Riding of Yorkshire administrative county from 1894 to 1974. The then township of Whitby was governed by the separate Whitby Urban District. The rural district included Danby and Fylingdales.

In 1974 it was abolished under the Local Government Act 1972. Together with Whitby Urban District it was replaced by the Borough of Scarborough in the non-metropolitan and ceremonial county of North Yorkshire.
