= Carkin =

Civil parish in North Yorkshire, England

Coordinates: 54.4803°N 1.7388°W

Carkin is a civil parish in North Yorkshire, England. It was created from the separation of the parish of Forcett and Carkin into "Carkin" and "Forcett" in 2015.

From 1974 to 2023 it was part of the district of Richmondshire, it is now administered by the unitary North Yorkshire Council.
