= Nidderdale Rural District =

Former local government area in the UK

Coordinates: 54.009°N 1.469°W

- Area
  - 1951: 75,009 acres (303.55 km^{2})
- Population
  - 1939: 13,432
  - 1961: 14,742
- History
  - Origin: Great Ouseburn Rural District, Knaresborough Rural District
  - Created: 1938
  - Abolished: 1974
  - Succeeded by: Borough of Harrogate
- Status: Rural district

Nidderdale was a rural district in the West Riding of Yorkshire from 1938 to 1974. It was created from the combination of most of the disbanded rural districts of Great Ouseburn and Knaresborough.

The district covered villages in the lower valley of the River Nidd between Hampsthwaite and York. Despite its name it included only a small part of Nidderdale, most of which was in Ripon and Pateley Bridge Rural District. It bordered Harrogate and Knaresborough urban districts on their west, north and east.

Charles Stourton, 26th Baron Mowbray, the premier baron, served on the district council from 1954 until 1959.

In 1974 it was merged with other districts under the Local Government Act 1972 to form part of the district of Harrogate in the new county of North Yorkshire.
