= Wath Rural District =

Former local government area in the UK

Coordinates: 54.188°N 1.506°W

Wath Rural District was a rural district in the North Riding of Yorkshire from 1894 to 1974. It was created in 1894 from that part of the Ripon rural sanitary district which was in the North Riding (the West Riding part becoming the Ripon Rural District.) It was named after the village of Wath.

In 1974 it was abolished under the Local Government Act 1972. Since then it has formed part of the district of Harrogate in North Yorkshire.
