= Middlesbrough Rural District =

Former local government area in the UK

Coordinates: 54.525°N 1.238°W

Middlesbrough Rural District was a rural district in the North Riding of Yorkshire, England from 1894 to 1932.

It was based on the Middlesbrough rural sanitary district created in 1875, which consisted of the Middlesbrough poor law union, except those parts in urban sanitary districts (that is: Middlesbrough, Eston (from 1884) and Thornaby).

The rural district from 1894 consisted of the following parishes

- Hemlington
- Ingleby Barwick
- Linthorpe
- Maltby
- Marton
- Stainton
- West Acklam

In 1913, Ormesby, formerly an urban district, became part of the rural district, whilst Linthorpe was added to the county borough of Middlesbrough.

Middlesbrough Rural District was abolished in 1932, with parts of the parishes of Hemlington, Marton, Ormesby and West Acklam becoming part of the county borough of Middlesbrough, and the rest becoming part of the Stokesley Rural District.
