= Sowerby-under-Cotcliffe =

Civil parish in North Yorkshire, England

Coordinates: 54.336°N 1.368°W

- Civil parish
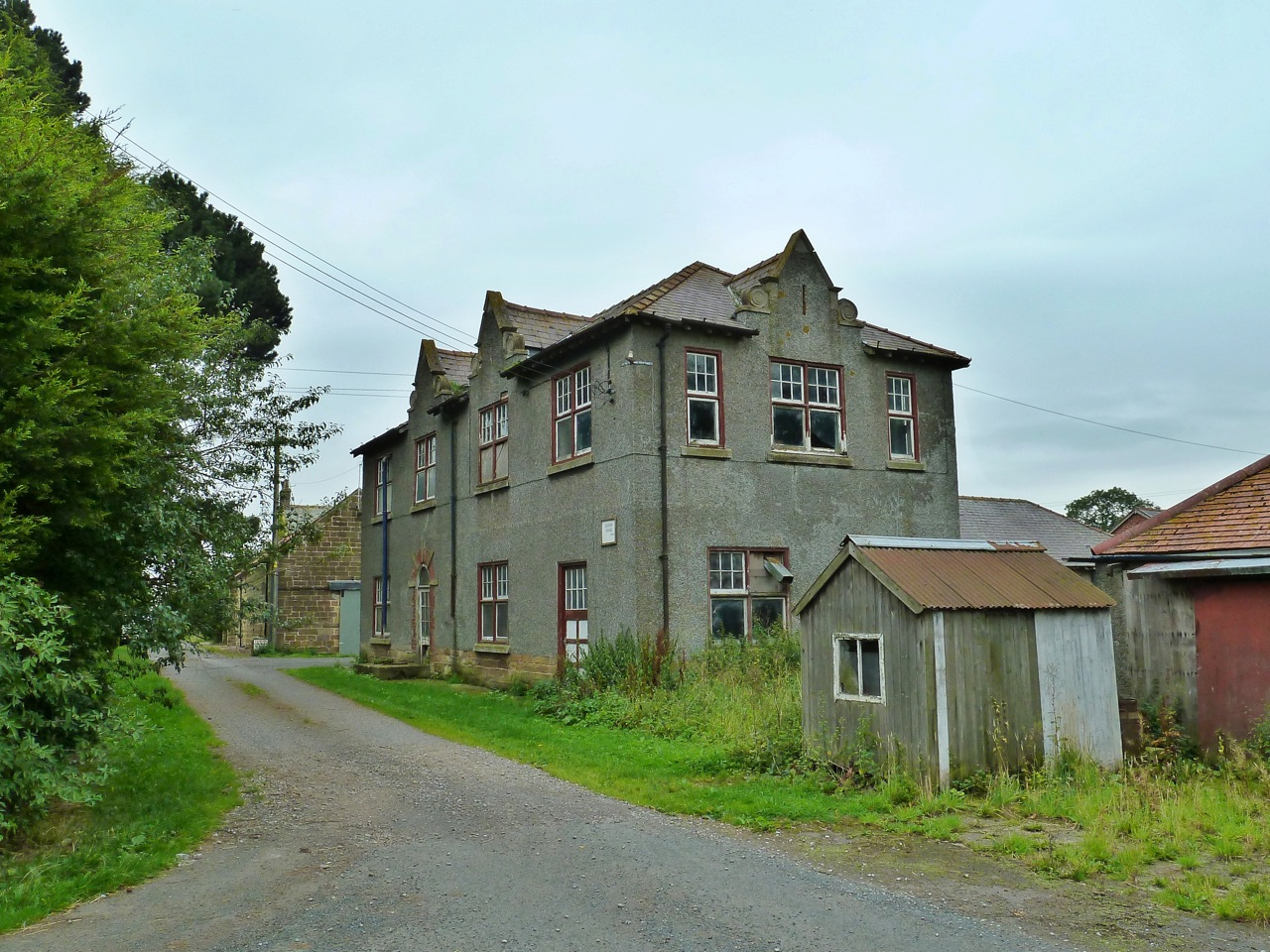
- Sowerby Grange (2010)

- Location within North Yorkshire
- Population: 30 (2015 NYCC)
- OS grid reference: SE409938
- Civil parish: Sowerby-under-Cotcliffe
- Unitary authority: North Yorkshire
- Ceremonial county: North Yorkshire
- Region: Yorkshire and the Humber
- Country: England
- Sovereign state: United Kingdom
- Post town: NORTHALLERTON
- Postcode district: DL6
- Police: North Yorkshire
- Fire: North Yorkshire
- Ambulance: Yorkshire

Sowerby-under-Cotcliffe is a civil parish in the county of North Yorkshire, England. The population at the 2011 Census was less than 100. Details are included in the civil parish of Winton, Stank and Hallikeld. It is 3 miles (4.8 km) east of Northallerton, 0.5 miles (0.8 km) south of Kirby Sigston, and 1.2 miles (2 km) west of the A19 road. The Cod Beck river flows to the east of the parish forming a border with KIrby Sigston and Landmoth-cum-Catto civil parishes.

In 2011, North Yorkshire County Council estimated the population to be 40, which had dropped to 30 by a 2015 estimate.

The area was recorded in the Domesday Book as belonging to King William and having 75 ploughlands with 100 acres (40 ha) of meadows. The name is a combination of the Old Norse Saurbi meaning swampy farmstead, and koteclyf, meaning Bank by the cottage.

At the turn of the 19th century, a Roman Road was uncovered when building work was being undertaken to build a new road. The 72-mile (116 km) route went from Barmby to Stamford Bridge, Thirsk and then onto Durham.

== Governance ==
Historically the area was within the wapentake of Allertonshire, and during the 13th century, the land was owned by the Bishop of Durham. From 1974 to 2023 it was part of the Hambleton District, it is now administered by the unitary North Yorkshire Council. It is represented at Parliament by the Richmond and Northallerton constituency.
