= Flaxton Rural District =

Former local government area in the UK

Coordinates: 54.052°N 0.963°W

Flaxton was a rural district in the North Riding of Yorkshire from 1894 to 1974. It was formed under the Local Government Act 1894 (56 & 57 Vict. c. 73) from the part of the York Rural Sanitary District which was in the North Riding.

It continued in existence until 1974 when, under the Local Government Act 1972, it was abolished, and went to form part of the Ryedale district. Some parishes have, since 1996, been part of the City of York district.
