= Ripon and Pateley Bridge Rural District =

Former local government area in the UK

Coordinates: 54.117°N 1.628°W

Ripon and Pateley Bridge was a rural district in the West Riding of Yorkshire, England from 1937 to 1974.

It was created in 1937 by a County Review Order, by a merger of the Ripon Rural District and the Pateley Bridge Rural District. The rural district included most of Nidderdale, and villages surrounding and to the west of Ripon. The city of Ripon itself had its own local government.

The district was abolished in 1974 under the Local Government Act 1972, being merged with other districts to form the Harrogate district of North Yorkshire.
