= Borough of Scarborough =

Former local government district in England

Scarborough
- Borough and non-metropolitan district
- Scarborough Town Hall

- Scarborough shown within North Yorkshire
- Coordinates: 54.280°N 0.402°W
- Sovereign state: United Kingdom
- Constituent country: England
- Region: Yorkshire and the Humber
- Ceremonial county: North Yorkshire
- Administrative HQ: Scarborough (Town Hall)

Government
  - Type: Non-metropolitan district
  - Body: Scarborough Borough Council

Area
  - Total: 315.1 sq mi (816.2 km^{2})

Population (2021)
  - Total: 108,700
  - Density: 344.9/sq mi (133.2/km^{2})
  - Ethnicity: 99.0% White
- Time zone: UTC+0 (Greenwich Mean Time)
  - Summer (DST): UTC+1 (British Summer Time)
- Postcode area: YO (11, 12, 13, 14, 21, 22)
- GSS code: E07000168
- NUTS 3 code: UKE22
- ONS code: 36UG
- Website: www.scarborough.gov.uk

The Borough of Scarborough (/ˈskɑːrbərə/) was a non-metropolitan district with borough status in North Yorkshire, England. In addition to the town of Scarborough, it covered a large stretch of the coast of Yorkshire, including Whitby and Filey. It bordered Redcar and Cleveland to the north, the Ryedale and Hambleton districts to the west and the East Riding of Yorkshire to the south.

The district was formed on 1 April 1974, under the Local Government Act 1972. It was a merger of the urban district of Filey and part of the Bridlington Rural District, from the historic East Riding of Yorkshire, along with the municipal borough of Scarborough, Scalby and Whitby urban districts, and Scarborough Rural District and Whitby Rural District, from the historic North Riding.

In 2007, the borough was threatened with extinction. In March of that year, North Yorkshire County Council was shortlisted by the Department for Communities and Local Government to become a unitary authority. If the bid had been successful then the Borough of Scarborough would — along with all other districts and boroughs in the present county of North Yorkshire — have been abolished then. The bid, however, was unsuccessful and the districts remained as they were previously constituted.

However, in July 2021 the Ministry of Housing, Communities and Local Government announced that in April 2023, the non-metropolitan county would be reorganised into a unitary authority. Scarborough Borough Council was abolished and its functions were transferred to a new single authority for the non-metropolitan county of North Yorkshire.

== Population ==
The population of Scarborough fell from around 108,800 in 2011 to 108,700 in 2021, marking a fall of 0.1%. It was one of only 3 local authorities in Yorkshire and The Humber to see a population decline. During that ten year period the median age increased from 46 to 50.

== Education ==
There were a total of 64 schools and colleges in the Scarborough area, as of 2012.

== Localities ==
The Borough of Scarborough included many civil parishes and suburbs including: Brompton-by-Sawdon, Broxa-cum-Troutsdale, Cloughton, Commondale, Crossgates, Eastfield, Glaisdale, Houlsyke, Hunmanby, Hutton Buscel, Irton, Littlebeck, Muston, Newby and Scalby, Ravenscar, Ruston, Silpho, Snainton, Seamer, West Ayton, Wykeham and others.

Wards of Scarborough town were Castle, Central, Eastfield, Falsgrave Park, Newby, North Bay, Northstead, Ramshill, Stepney, Weaponness, and Woodlands. Areas without namesake wards included Westborough (centre), Barrowcliff and Newlands.

In 2016, the borough ranked second in Visit England's survey of overall holiday trips and holiday spend, topped only by London.

== Media ==
Since 1882, it has been served by The Scarborough News, which is published every Thursday.

The Scarborough Borough receives a daily radio news services from these radio stations, BBC Radio York which covers Scarborough, BBC Radio Tees covering Whitby & Greatest Hits Radio Yorkshire Coast which was previously known as Yorkshire Coast Radio and used to have studios in Scarborough.This is The Coast broadcasts from Scarborough on DAB and provides regular local news bulletins.

Local news and television programmes in Scarborough is covered by BBC Yorkshire & ITV Yorkshire from Leeds and Whitby receives their local news and television programmes from BBC North East & Cumbria & ITV Tyne Tees in Newcastle.

== Freedom of the Borough ==
The following people and military units have received the Freedom of the Borough of Scarborough.

=== Individuals ===
- H. D. G. Leveson-Gower: 1950
- Max Jaffa: 1986.
- Alan Ayckbourn: 1986.
- Alan Booth: 1999
- Charles McCarthy: 1996.
- Max Payne : 1999.
- Thomas Pindar: 1999.
- Sir John Wilson: 1999.
- Bernard Bosomworth: 2005.
- Elizabeth Mackenzie: 2005.
- Sir Jimmy Savile: 2005. (Revoked on 5 November 2012 by unanimous vote of Scarborough Borough Council due to the sexual abuse scandal).
- Christopher Wilby: 2005.
- Ken Dale: 2009.
- 5th Baron Derwent: 2009.
- Tony Peers: 2009.
- George Thomas Tuby: 2009.
- Paul Ingle: 24 February 2012.
- Andrew Boyes: 24 February 2012.
- Timothy Boyes: 24 February 2012.
- Donald Robinson: 24 February 2012.
- Beth Mead: 20 March 2023.
- Zoe Aldcroft: 20 March 2023.

=== Military units ===
- 64 Medical Squadron 5 Medical Regiment RAMC: 2007.
- 3 Medical Regiment RAMC: May 2015.
- The Yorkshire Regiment.
