= Skeeby =

Village and civil parish in North Yorkshire, England

Coordinates: 54°25′06″N 1°41′36″W

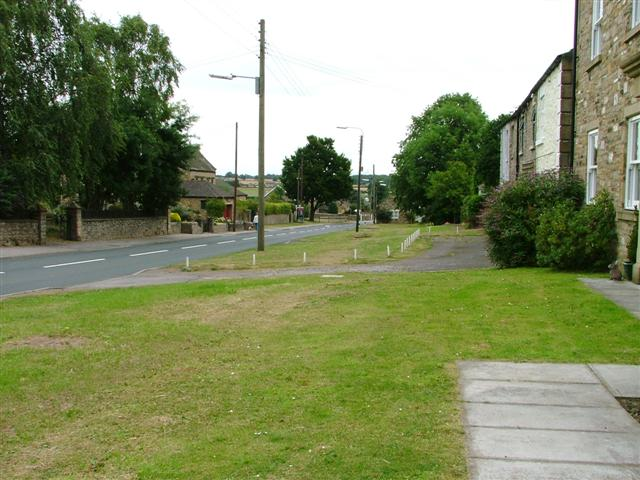
- Skeeby

- Location within North Yorkshire
- Population: 357 (2011 census)
- OS grid reference: NZ200025
- Unitary authority: North Yorkshire
- Ceremonial county: North Yorkshire
- Region: Yorkshire and the Humber
- Country: England
- Sovereign state: United Kingdom
- Post town: RICHMOND
- Postcode district: DL10
- Dialling code: 01748
- Police: North Yorkshire
- Fire: North Yorkshire
- Ambulance: Yorkshire
- UK Parliament: Richmond and Northallerton

Skeeby is a village and civil parish about 18 miles (29 km) north-west of the county town of Northallerton in North Yorkshire, England.

== History ==
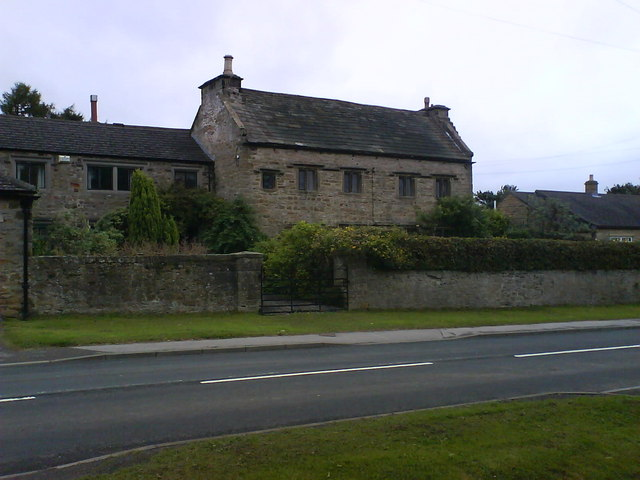
Skeeby Manor House, built between 1534-1699, was mentioned in Pevsner's Buildings Of England

The name Skeeby possibly derives from the Old Norse Skithibȳ meaning 'Skithi's village'. Alternatively, it may derive from skíðibȳ meaning 'billet of wood/firewood village'.

Skeeby was recorded as Schirebi in the Domesday Book – the description being: "In Skeeby there are six carucates and there could be four ploughs there". In other early references to the village it is known as Schireby in the 11th century, Scythebi and Scideby in the 12th century, Schideby, Skitteby and Skytheby in the 13th and 14th centuries and finally Skeitby or Skeby in the 16th century.

The origins of Skeeby Bridge, over Gilling Beck, date from the early 14th century, the existing structure being a 17th-century Grade II listed structure that was widened by John Carr in 1781/2. The earliest remaining buildings in the village date from the 17th and 18th centuries. In 1870-72, John Marius Wilson's Imperial Gazetteer of England and Wales described Skeeby: SKEEBY, a township in Easby parish, N. R. Yorkshire; 2½ miles ENE of Richmond. Acres, 770. Real property, £1,234. Pop., 180. Houses, 42.

== Governance ==
The village lies within the Richmond and Northallerton parliamentary constituency. From 1974 to 2023 it was part of the district of Richmondshire, it is now administered by the unitary North Yorkshire Council.

== Geography ==
Skeeby is located on the A6108 road, the main road between Richmond and Scotch Corner, linking with the A66 and A1(M) motorway. The nearest settlements to Skeeby are Richmond, 2.3 miles (3.7 km) to the west and Gilling West 2.8 miles (4.5 km). A small beck flows through the village, as well as Gilling Beck which becomes Skeeby Beck and flows under Skeeby Bridge, as a consequence the main road and farmland surrounding Gilling Beck are prone to flooding. Skeeby Beck flows into the River Swale just above Brompton-on-Swale.

== Demography ==
Population
Year	1881	1891	1901	1911	1921	1931	1951	1961	2001	2011
Total	159	148	146	126	122	158	195	253	379	357

=== 2011 census ===
The 2011 UK census showed that the population was split 44.3% male to 55.7% female. The religious constituency was made of 75.1% Christian, 0.8% Buddhist, 0.3% Muslim, 0.3% Other religions and the rest stating no religion or not stating at all. The ethnic make-up was 97.5% White British, 0.6% British Asian and 0.8% each White Other. There were 188 dwellings.

== Community and culture ==
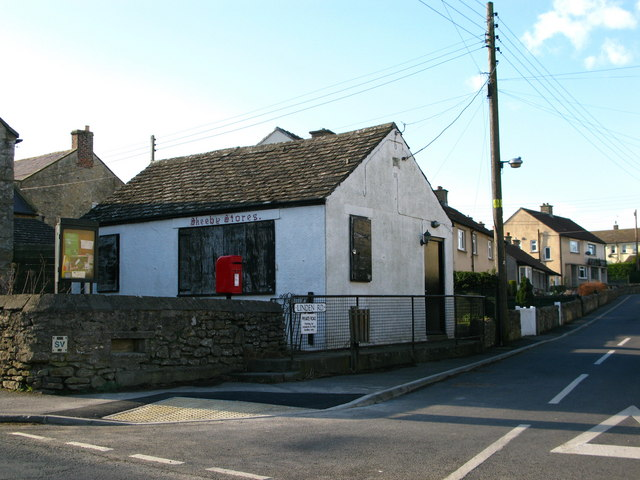
The former village shop, prior to refurbishment

Education for the village children is provided by three primary schools in nearby Richmond (CE, Methodist and St Mary's). Pupils then receive secondary education at Richmond School & Sixth Form College. The public house, the Traveller's Rest, was closed in 2008 and since then there had been many negotiations by the community-founded "Skeeby Community Pub Society" in order to purchase the pub back for the villagers. The pub was re-opened by the villagers in April 2023, 15 years after it had first closed. The village shop, known as "Skeeby Stores" and the post office are also now no longer in business, the store premises have since been refurbished, awaiting new ownership, while the old post office is a cottage.

== Religion ==
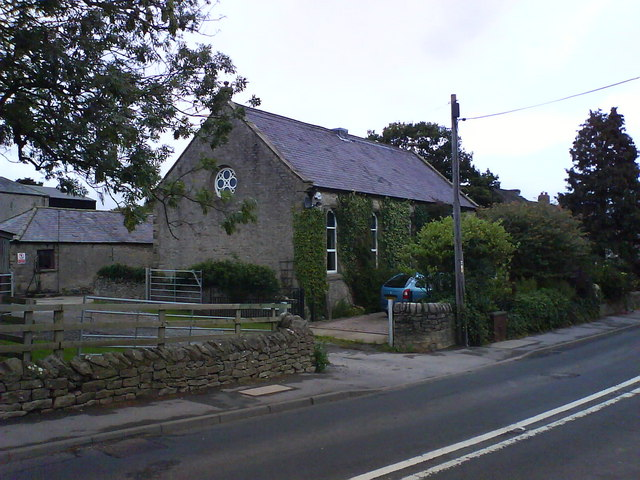
The former Wesleyan Chapel, now a home.

St Agatha's Church, Skeeby was built in 1840, being used as a second chapel of ease to St Agatha's Church, Easby, a larger and older church. It served both as a church and a school, until the school moved across the road during Victorian times, into what is now a residential abode. There was also a Wesleyan chapel, which has now also been converted into a residence.

== See also ==
- Listed buildings in Skeeby
