= Gilling (disambiguation) =

Gilling is a figure in Norse mythology.

Gilling or Gillings may also refer to:

Placename in Yorkshire, England

- Gilling Abbey
- Gilling East, village
  - Gilling Castle
  - Gilling railway station
- Gilling West, village
  - Gilling with Hartforth and Sedbury, civil parish

People with the surname

- John Gilling (1912–1984), film director
- Rebecca Gilling (born 1953), actress
- Richard Gillings, archdeacon
- Zoe Gillings (born 1985), snowboarder

Other

- Gilling (textiles), combing fibres in textile manufacture
