= Matthew Raine =

English schoolmaster and cleric

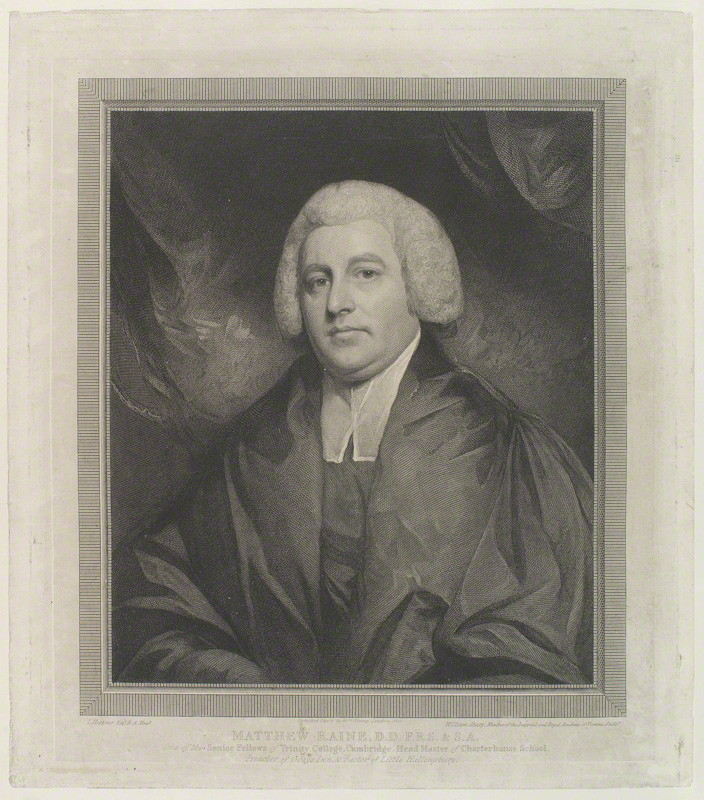
Matthew Raine

Matthew Raine (1760–1811) was an English schoolmaster and cleric.

== Life ==
He was born on 20 May 1760 at Gilling in the North Riding of Yorkshire; his father Matthew Raine was vicar of St. John's, Stanwick and rector of Kirkby Wiske, and also master of a school at Hartforth, while his mother Esther was from Cumberland. After education under his father, with William Beloe for a schoolfellow, he was admitted a scholar of Charterhouse School, in June 1772, on the king's nomination (obtained, according to Beloe, through the interest of Lord Percy, a patron of his father). In 1778 he went as an exhibitioner to Trinity College, Cambridge, where he graduated B.A. in 1782 (M.A. 1785, B.D. 1794, D.D. 1799). In 1783 and 1784 he gained the members' university prize, and in the latter year was also made Fellow of Trinity.

After some time spent in tutoring, Raine was appointed headmaster of Charterhouse School on 7 June 1791, in succession to Samuel Berdmore: Charles Burney was one of his competitors. Here he remained till his death. In 1803 he was elected a fellow of the Royal Society, and in 1809 was chosen preacher of Gray's Inn. In July 1810 he was presented to the rectory of Little Hallingbury, Essex, in the gift of the governors of the Charterhouse.

Raine died unmarried on 17 September 1811. He was buried in the chapel of the Charterhouse, where there was a gravestone in the south aisle inscribed M. R., and a mural tablet on the adjoining wall by John Flaxman, with an epitaph by Samuel Parr—Parr and Richard Porson were close friends. His collection of classical books, including rare editions, went by bequest, after the death of his brother Jonathan Raine, to the library of Trinity College, Cambridge. He was a benefactor of the Society of Schoolmasters. His only published works were two sermons.

== Notes ==
Attribution

This article incorporates text from a publication now in the public domain: Stephen, Leslie, ed. (1886). "Raine, Matthew". Dictionary of National Biography. Vol. 7. London: Smith, Elder & Co.
