= Gillingwood Hall =

Historic building in North Yorkshire, England

Coordinates: 54°26′16″N 1°44′17″W

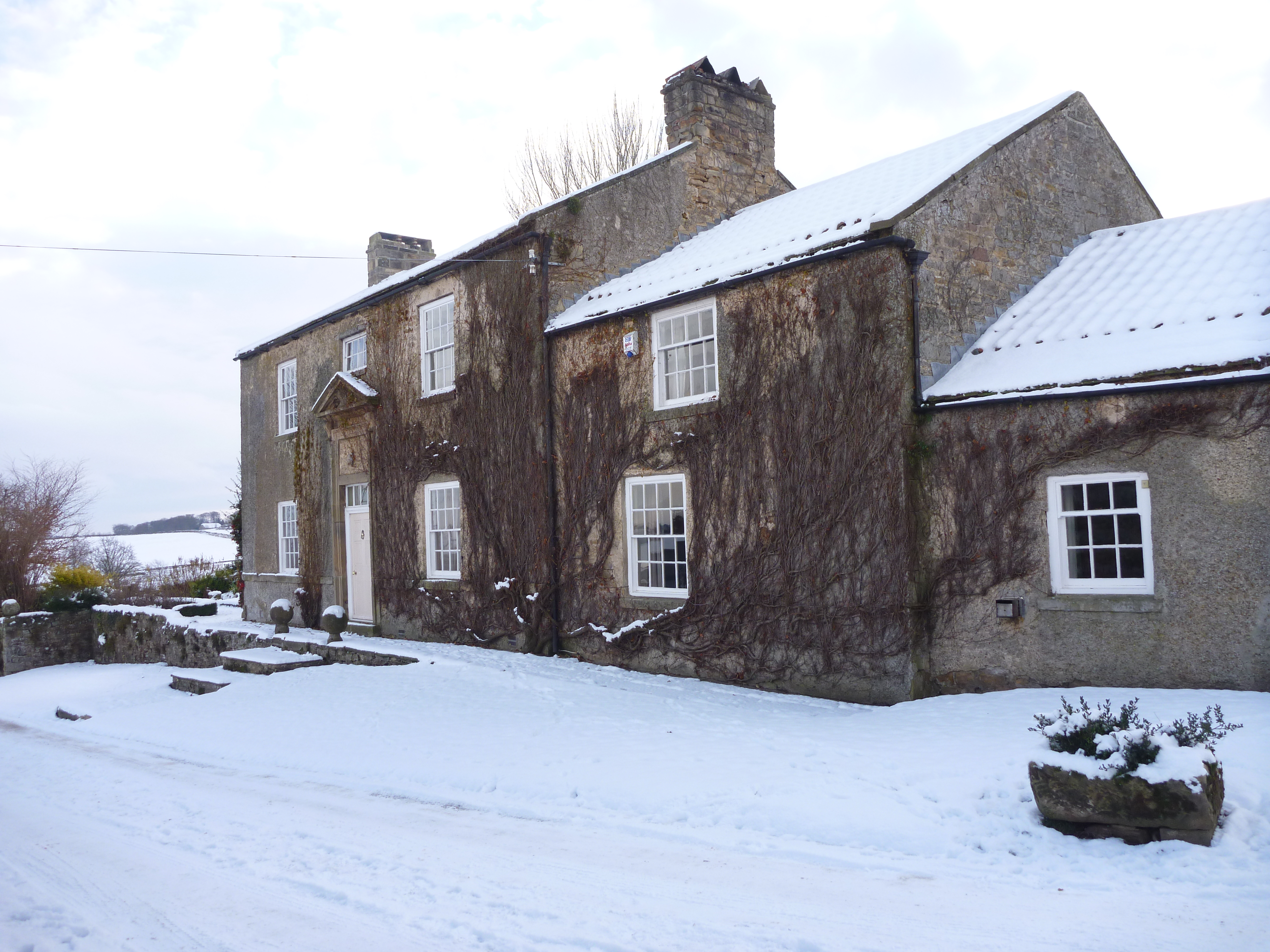
The building, in 2010

Gillingwood Hall is a historic building in Gilling West, a village in North Yorkshire, in England.

The first Gillingwood Hall was a country house, built by the Wharton family in the early 17th century. It was partly rebuilt in the mid 18th century, possibly to the designs of Daniel Garrett. The house burned down in 1750, although various outbuildings survived. In about 1800, a farmhouse was built on the site, also named "Gillingwood Hall". The farmhouse was grade II listed in 1969.

The farmhouse is built of stone, with a T-shaped plan. The main block has two storeys, three bays, and a stone slate roof with stone coping. It has a sill band, and in the centre is a re-used doorcase with an architrave and a fanlight, over which is a blank panel, and a pediment on consoles, and in the upper floor are sash windows. To the right is a lower two-storey bay that has a pantile roof with stone slates at the eaves. Further to the right is a single-storey bay, and at the rear is a wing on the right.

The front doorway of the old hall survives, set into a wall. It has a rounded arch, and an archivolt rising from capitals. This is surrounded by fluted Roman Doric engaged columns, and a Doric entablature with guttae, triglyphs, metopes with paterae, and mutules with an acanthus motif, surmounted by a pediment. The stone wall extends for about 1 metre (3 ft 3 in) on each side, and part of a window survives in the right wall. The structure is grade II listed.

== Summerhouse ==
Southwest of the farmhouse, a former summer house survives, sometimes known as the "Tea House". It is a grade II* listed building, constructed in the early or mid 18th century. It is built of sandstone, and has roofs of Welsh and Westmorland slate. It has a T-shaped plan, and is set into a hillside. There are two storeys, a rusticated basement at the front, and three bays. The middle bay on the front has four unfluted Roman Doric columns, a full entablature and a pediment. On each side is a shell niche, and above it is a cornice and a hipped roof. The rear has quoins, and the middle bay is open with an apsidal rear wall. Above is an open pediment containing an oculus flanked by shell niches.

== Bell Park Pavilion ==
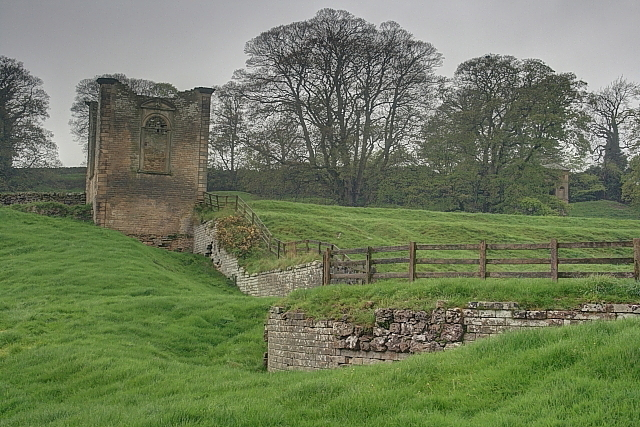
Bell Park Pavilion

The Bell Park Pavilion is a grade II listed folly, also early or mid 18th century, and lying south of the farmhouse. It is built of sandstone, with two storeys and a square plan with sides of one bay. On each side are rusticated quoin strips ending in cornice capitals. In the upper floor on each side is a round-arched opening with a chamfered surround and an archivolt with a keystone containing acanthus and egg and dart motifs, above which is a broken segmental pediment. It has been adapted for use as a cow shelter.

== See also ==
- Grade II* listed buildings in North Yorkshire (district)
- Listed buildings in Gilling with Hartforth and Sedbury
