= Listed buildings in Skeeby =

Skeeby is a civil parish in the county of North Yorkshire, England. It contains twelve listed buildings that are recorded in the National Heritage List for England. Of these, one is listed at Grade II*, the middle of the three grades, and the others are at Grade II, the lowest grade. The parish contains the village of Skeeby and the surrounding countryside. The listed buildings consist of houses, farmhouses, a bridge, a church and two mileposts.

== Key ==
| Grade | Criteria |
|---|---|
| II* | Particularly important buildings of more than special interest |
| II | Buildings of national importance and special interest |

== Buildings ==
| Name and location | Photograph | Date | Notes | Grade |
|---|---|---|---|---|
| Manor House; 54.41855°N 1.69276°W | | Early to mid-17th century | The house is in stone, with quoins, and a stone slate roof with stone coped raised verges and kneelers. There are two storeys, a T-shaped plan, a front range of five bays, and a rear stair turret flanked by outshuts. In the centre is a doorway with a triangular head and a moulded quoined surround, flanked by two-light mullioned windows, all under a continuous hood mould. The upper floor contains a fire window in the left bay, and two-light mullioned windows with continuous hood moulds over each pair. To the left is a former barn incorporated into the house, and beyond that is a former coach house. | II* |
| Skeeby Bridge; 54.42135°N 1.68756°W | — | 17th century | The bridge carries the A6108 road over Skeeby Beck. It is in stone, and consists of four unevenly spaced arches, including a dry arch. Some of the arches are segmental, others are semicircular, and one is mainly below ground. The parapets have segmental stone coping. | II |
| Halfe Hill House; 54.41792°N 1.69505°W | — | Late 17th century | A farmhouse, later a private house, it is in stone, and has a pantile roof with stone slate in the lower courses, and raised verges. There are two storeys and four bays. The doorway has a stone architrave, to its right is a four-pane light vent, and the windows are sashes. | II |
| Lynsam; 54.41840°N 1.69328°W | — | Late 17th century | A stone house with quoins, and a tile roof with stone coping and kneelers. There are two storeys and two bays. The doorway is in the right bay, and the windows are sashes. On the left gable end is a blocked two-light chamfered mullioned window. | II |
| 16 Richmond Road; 54.41746°N 1.69553°W | — | Late 17th to early 18th century | The house is in stone, with quoins, and a tile roof with raised verges. There are two storeys, two bays and a rear outshut. The central doorway has a quoined surround, and the windows are sashes. Inside, there is an inglenook fireplace. | II |
| Hall Farmhouse; 54.41783°N 1.69223°W | — | 1747 | The farmhouse is in roughcast stone, and has an M-shaped roof tile with stone coping and shaped kneelers. There are three storeys, a double depth plan, and three bays. The central doorway has a two-pane fanlight and a modillion cornice. The windows are sashes in architraves. The middle window in the top floor is blind, and to its right is a dated and initialled plaque. At the rear is a tall stair window. | II |
| Hill House; 54.41751°N 1.69454°W | — | Mid to late 18th century | The house is in sandstone, with quoins, and a tile roof with stone copings and shaped kneelers. There are two storeys and three bays. The central doorway has a fanlight, and the windows are sashes. | II |
| 44 Richmond Road; 54.41813°N 1.69297°W | — | Late 18th century | The house is in stone with a pantile roof. There are two storeys and two bays. The doorway is in the centre, and the windows are sashes. | II |
| 17 Richmond Road; 54.41786°N 1.69526°W | — | Early 19th century | Two houses combined into one, in sandstone, with quoins and stone slate roofs. There are two storeys, and each house has two bays, the left house higher. The doorway is in the right house, and the windows are sashes. | II |
| St Agatha's Church; 54.41852°N 1.69170°W | | 1840 | The church is in stone on a plinth, with quoins, and a Welsh slate roof with stone copings. It consists of a four-bay nave and chancel in one unit, and a lower range to the south. On the west gable is a bellcote. At the west end is a doorway with a pointed arch and a chamfered surround, above which is a lancet window and a dated plaque. Along the north front are four lancet windows with chamfered surrounds, on the east front are three similar windows, and the south range has a doorway and a window. | II |
| Barracks Bank Milepost; 54.43142°N 1.67960°W | — | Late 19th century | The milepost is on the east side of Barracks Bank (A6108 road). It is in cast iron, and has a triangular plan and a sloping top. On the top is inscribed "RICHMOND H D", on each side is a pointing hand, on the left side is the distance to Richmond, and on the right side to Darlington. | II |
| Milepost east of School House; 54.41876°N 1.69102°W | | Late 19th century | The milepost is on the south side of Richmond road, (A6108 road). It is in cast iron, and has a triangular plan and a sloping top. On the top is inscribed "RICHMOND H D", on each side is a pointing hand, on the left side is the distance to Richmond, and on the right side to Darlington. | II |
