= Skeeby Bridge =

Bridge in Skeeby, North Yorkshire, England

Coordinates: 54.4213°N 1.6875°W

Skeeby Bridge is a historic structure in Skeeby, a village in North Yorkshire, in England.

In 1328, the hermit of Skeeby raised funds for a bridge over the Skeeby Beck. The current structure dates from the 17th century. In 1782, John Carr improved the bridge, at a cost of £205, rebuilding all but one of the arches on the downstream side. In the early 19th century, the bridge was widened on the upstream side. It was grade II listed in 1986. In 2019, North Yorkshire County Council announced plans to dismantle and rebuild the bridge, which were opposed by the Society for the Protection of Ancient Buildings and the Council for British Archaeology. In 2023, the council instead put forward plans for traffic lights to regulate traffic flow on the bridge.

The bridge carries the A6108 road. It is built of a mixture of rubble and dressed stone, and consists of four unevenly spaced arches, including a dry arch. Some of the arches are segmental, others are semicircular, and one is mainly below ground. The parapets have segmental stone coping.

== See also ==
- Listed buildings in Skeeby
