= St Agatha's Church, Skeeby =

Church building in Skeeby, North Yorkshire, England

Coordinates: 54°25′07″N 1°41′30″W

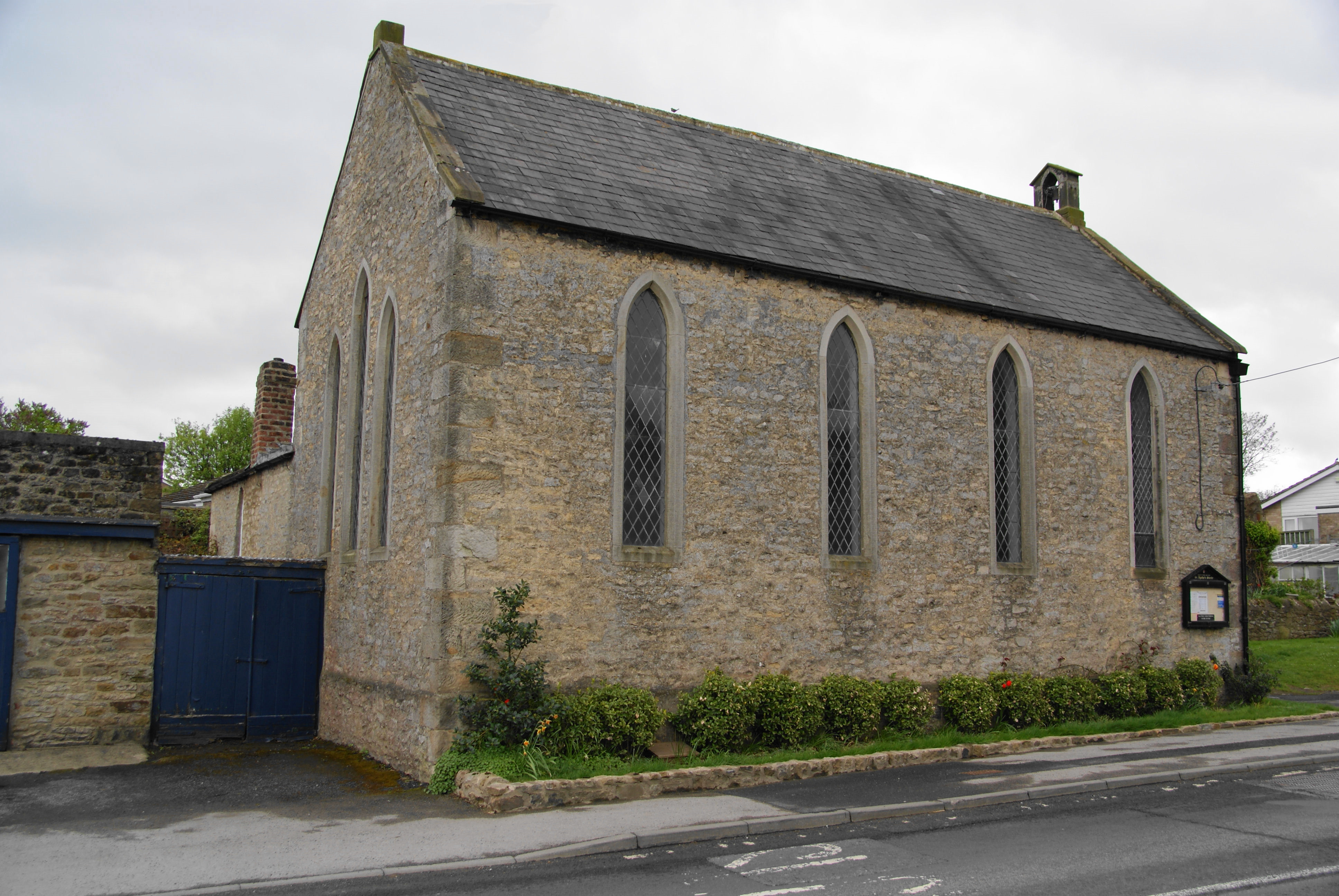
The church, in 2010

St Agatha's Church is a closed church in Skeeby, a village in North Yorkshire, in England.

Skeeby lies in the parish of St Agatha's Church, Easby. A hermitage was recorded in the village in 1328, but there was no Anglican church until 1840, when a school was constructed, the building also being used as a chapel of ease. The building was grade II listed in 1986, by which time it was operated solely as a chapel. On Christmas Day in 1987, the church bell fell to the ground while being rung. In 2004, the first funeral was conducted in the church, the church door generally being too narrow to admit a coffin. The church closed in 2023, and in 2024 was marketed for sale for £130,000, for potential conversion into a house.

The church is built of stone on a plinth, with quoins, and a Welsh slate roof with stone copings. It consists of a four-bay nave and chancel in one unit, and a lower range to the south. On the west gable is a bellcote. At the west end is a doorway with a pointed arch and a chamfered surround, above which is a lancet window and a dated plaque. Along the north front are four lancet windows with chamfered surrounds, on the east front are three similar windows, and the south range has a doorway and a window.

== See also ==
- Listed buildings in Skeeby
