= St Agatha's Church, Gilling West =

Church in North Yorkshire, England

Coordinates: 54°26′29″N 1°43′15″W

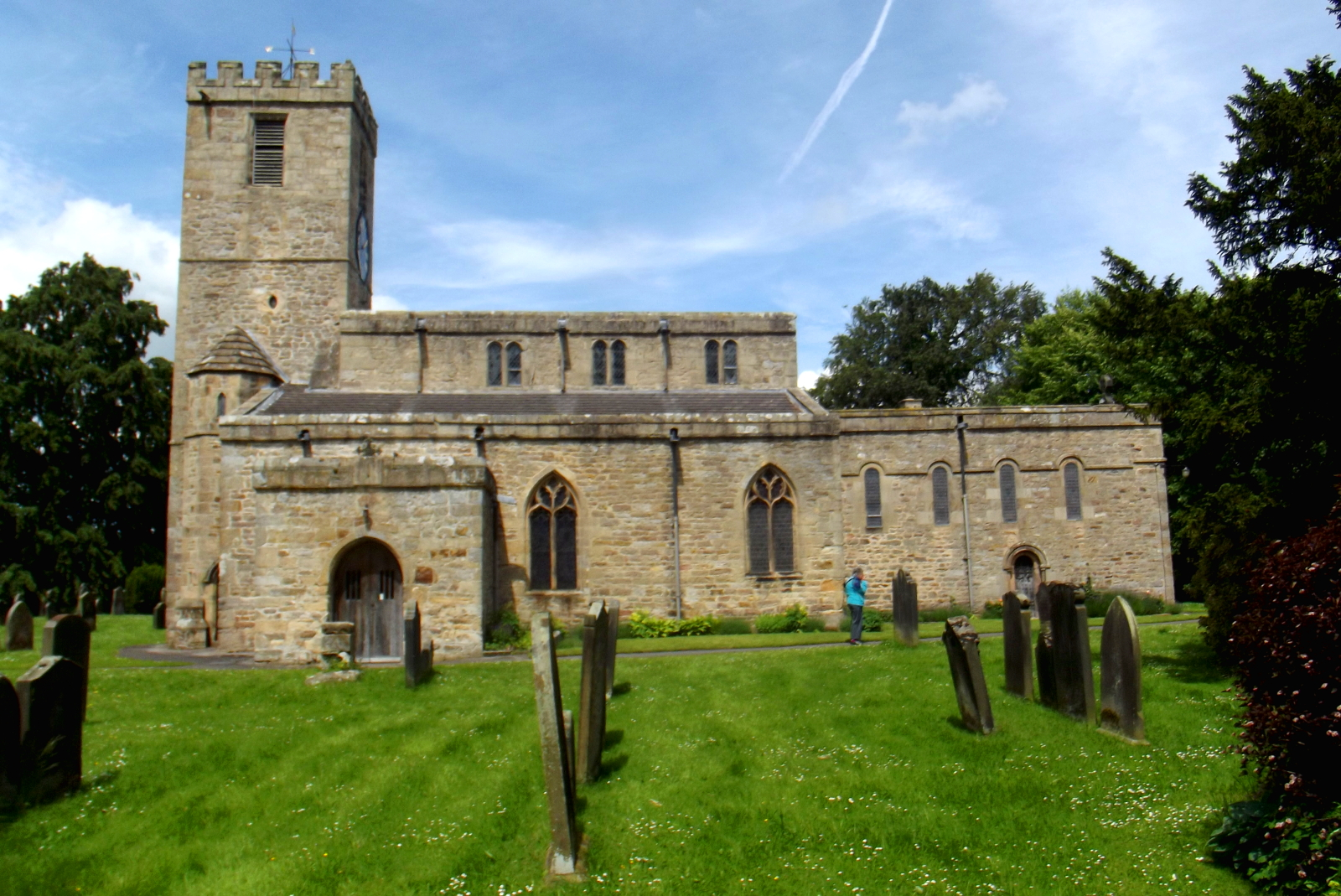
- The church in 2019

St Agatha's Church is an Anglican church in Gilling West, a village in North Yorkshire, in England.

The church was originally built in the late 11th century, as a small rectangular building with a west tower. In the 14th century, the nave was altered, and a vestry was added on the north side of the chancel. Around this time, a new chancel arch and south aisle were added, followed later in the century by a north aisle. The tower was heightened in the late 15th century, when the windows were also altered. In 1845, the church was restored by Ignatius Bonomi and John Augustus Cory, who added a second north aisle and a stair turret. The building was grade I listed in 1969.

The church is built of stone and has roofs of Welsh slate, stone slate and lead. It consists of a nave with a clerestory, a south aisle, a south porch, inner and outer north aisles, a chancel with a north vestry, and a west tower. The tower has three stages, a five-sided south stair turret with a pyramidal roof, chamfered bands, a three-light west window, a clock face on the east side, straight-headed bell openings, an embattled parapet, and a central weathercock. In the porch are several pre-Conquest carved stones and some later Mediaeval stones, including a grave cover. The nave roof is 15th century, while most of the fittings are 19th century. There is a black marble monument to Henry and Isabelle Boynton, dating from about 1531, and assorted 18th- and 19th-century wall monuments.

== See also ==
- Grade I listed buildings in North Yorkshire (district)
- Listed buildings in Gilling with Hartforth and Sedbury
