= St Paul's Church, Brompton-on-Swale =

Church in North Yorkshire, England

Coordinates: 54°23′32″N 1°40′10″W

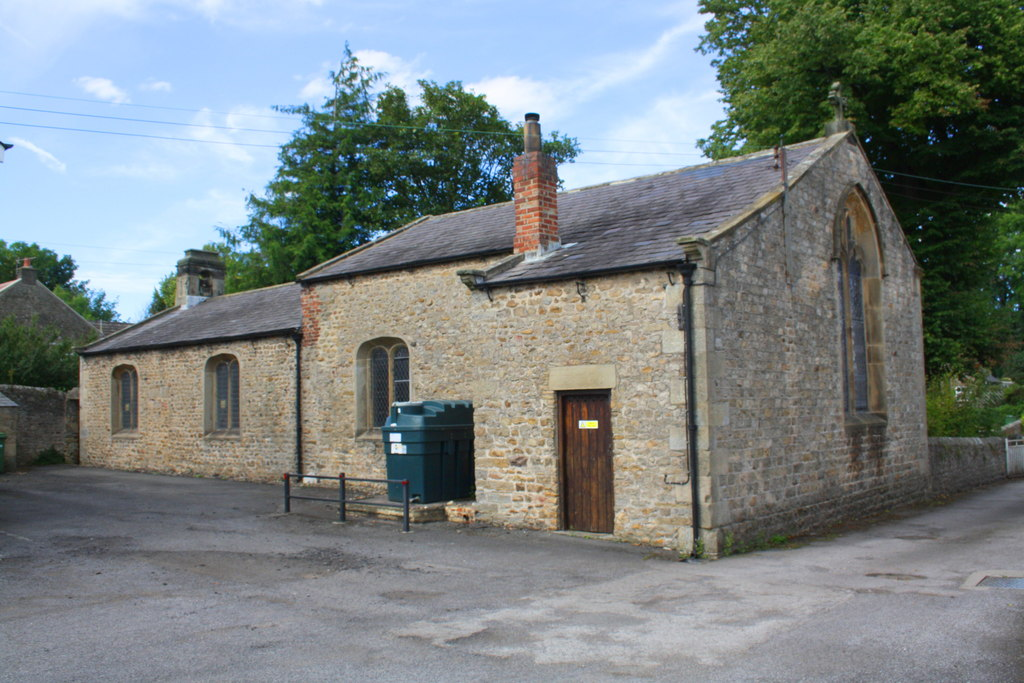
The church, in 2016

St Paul's Church is an Anglican church in Brompton-on-Swale, a village in North Yorkshire, in England.

The village is part of the parish of St Agatha's Church, Easby. Brompton did not have its own place of worship until 1838, when a chapel of ease was constructed. Half of the building was partitioned off as a schoolroom until 1872, when a new school was built behind the church. The church was Grade II listed in 1969. It was reordered in the 1990s, with the pews replaced by moveable seats.

It church is built of stone with a Welsh slate roof, and consists of a two-bay nave with a north porch, and a higher two-bay chancel with a south vestry. On the west gable is a bellcote with Baroque-style coping. The windows in the nave and the east window have Perpendicular tracery, while the other windows in the chancel have Y-tracery.

== See also ==
- Listed buildings in Brompton-on-Swale
