= Listed buildings in Brompton-on-Swale =

Brompton-on-Swale is a civil parish in the county of North Yorkshire, England. It contains 29 listed buildings that are recorded in the National Heritage List for England. All the listed buildings are designated at Grade II, the lowest of the three grades, which is applied to "buildings of national importance and special interest". The parish contains the village of Brompton-on-Swale and the surrounding countryside. Most of the listed buildings are houses, cottages and associated structures, farmhouses and farm buildings, the majority of them along Richmond Road in the village. The other listed buildings include a bridge, a church, a milepost and a war memorial.

== Buildings ==
| Name and location | Photograph | Date | Notes |
|---|---|---|---|
| Home Farmhouse; 54.39257°N 1.66864°W | — | Late 17th century | The house is in stone, and has a pantile roof with stone slates at the eaves, stone copings and shaped kneelers. There are two storeys, a cellar under the rear end, two bays, and a stair turret at the rear. The doorway has a projecting moulded surround on plinths, above it is a fire window, and in both floors are three-light chamfered mullioned windows. Inside the house is an inglenook fireplace. |
| Brompton Bridge; 54.39412°N 1.67555°W | | 1691 | The bridge carries the B6271 road over Skeeby Beck, and was later altered and widened. It is in stone and consists of a single segmental arch. The older part on the downstream side has voussoirs, a slab hood mould, and a cobble parapet with segmental coping. On the upstream side are rock-faced rusticated voussoirs, a band, and a parapet with segmental coping. |
| Oak Grange; 54.41483°N 1.66329°W | — | c. 1700 | The farmhouse, at one time an inn, is in pebbledashed brick on a plinth, with sandstone dressings, chamfered rusticated quoins, moulded string courses, and a hipped Welsh slate roof with diagonally-placed kneelers at the corners. There are three storeys and two bays, a two-storey rear range on the left, and a two-storey outshut on the right. The doorway has an architrave with imposts and a tall keystone in a surround with scrolled bases, and baluster-like jambs with scrolled tops with acanthus leaves, over which is a cornice with a broken segmental pediment. In the lower two floors are two-light chamfered mullioned windows, and the top floor contains sash windows. |
| 20 Richmond Road; 54.39248°N 1.66707°W | — | Late 17th to early 18th century | A pair of stone cottages later combined into one, with a pantile roof. There are two storeys, two bays and a rear outshut. The doorway is in the centre, and the windows are sashes, all but one of them horizontally-sliding. |
| Former King William IV public house 54.39238°N 1.66422°W | | c. 1728 | The former public house is rendered and has a Welsh slate roof. There are two storeys and four bays. The doorway has a quoined stone surround and a tripartite keystone. In the ground floor are three square bay windows, and the upper floor contains sash windows. |
| Inglenook; 54.39201°N 1.66521°W | — | c. 1733 | A stone house with quoins, and a pantile roof with a course of stone slates at the eaves, stone copings and shaped kneelers. There are two storeys and two bays. In the centre is a doorcase with Roman Doric pilasters, a frieze with triglyphs, and a pediment, and a doorway with an architrave and a tripartite keystone. The windows are sashes, and inside the house is an inglenook fireplace. |
| Ivy Cottage; 54.39255°N 1.66808°W | — | Early to mid 18th century | The cottage is in stone and has a pantile roof. There are two storeys and three bays. The doorway has a rusticated quoined chamfered surround. To the right is a canted bay window, and the other windows are casements. |
| Manor House; 54.39245°N 1.66612°W | — | Early to mid 18th century | The house, at one time a brewery, is rendered, on a plinth, with stone gutter brackets, and a Welsh slate roof with stone copings and shaped kneelers. There are two storeys, a cellar and attics, and six bays. The doorway has a fanlight, in the cellar is a mullioned window, and the other windows are sashes. In the centre of the upper floor is a sundial on a raised panel, in a frame with a Baroque top. |
| Sundial House; 54.39248°N 1.66692°W | — | Early to mid 18th century | The house is roughcast, and has a Welsh slate roof with stone copings and shaped kneelers. There are two storeys, three bays, and a single-storey single-bay extension to the right. The central doorway has an architrave and a tripartite keystone, and the windows are sashes. Above the doorway is a sundial in a frame with swan-neck pedimented top and a shell motif in the apex of the pediment. |
| Laburnam Cottage; 54.39202°N 1.66533°W | — | Mid 18th century | The house is in stone, with quoins on the right, and a tile roof with stone coping on the right. There are two storeys and three bays. The doorway has a quoined surround and an extended lintel with a keystone, and the windows are sashes. |
| 16 Richmond Road; 54.39218°N 1.66707°W | — | Mid to late 18th century | The cottage is in stone with a pantile roof, two storeys and one bay. To the left is a doorway with a flush surround and a large keystone, and the windows are casements with keystones. |
| Tylecote and Swiss Cottage; 54.39209°N 1.66582°W | — | 1771 | Three cottages, later two houses, in stone, with quoins, and a pantile roof with stone coping and a shaped kneeler on the right. There are two storeys, five bays, and a lesser range at the rear. There are two doorways with tripartite keystones, the right with a quoined surround. Over the right doorway is a round-headed plaque with an inscribed and dated moulded panel. Along the front are later square bay windows with a continuous tile roof, and in the upper floor are sash windows with tripartite keystones. |
| 22 Richmond Road; 54.39255°N 1.66760°W | — | Late 18th to early 19th century | A stone cottage with quoins on the right, and a tile roof with stone coped gables and shaped kneelers. There are two storeys and two bays. The doorway is on the left, the windows are casements, and all the openings have projecting stone surrounds. |
| 3 Station Road; 54.39240°N 1.66395°W | — | Late 18th to early 19th century | A stable and two cottages, later converted into one house, in stone with quoins, two storeys and three bays. The left bay projects and has a Welsh slate roof, and the right two bays have a pantile roof. There is a doorway in each part, and the windows are sashes. One of the quoins on the right has a weathered sundial, and in the left return is a blocked pitching door. |
| Chapel House; 54.39214°N 1.66640°W | — | Late 18th to early 19th century | A stone cottage with quoins on the left, and a pantile roof with stone coping on the left. There are two storeys and a single bay. The doorway is on the left, and the windows are casements. |
| Estrella Cottage; 54.39218°N 1.66697°W | — | Late 18th to early 19th century | A house divided into two cottages, refronted in stone, with quoins, and a pantile roof with stone copings. There are two storeys and two bays. The doorways have rusticated chamfered quoined surrounds, and extended lintels with tripartite keystones. The right doorway is blocked, and the windows are top-hung casements. |
| Greystones; 54.39213°N 1.66894°W | — | Late 18th to early 19th century | Two cottages combined into one house, it is in stone, with quoins, and a stone slate roof with stone copings and shaped kneelers. There are two storeys and three bays. The doorway has a stone surround on splayed plinths. The ground floor windows are sashes, in the upper floor are casement windows, and there is one small casement to the right of the doorway. |
| Phoenix House; 54.39218°N 1.66773°W | — | Late 18th to early 19th century | The house, at one time an inn, is roughcast, and has a pantile roof with stone copings and shaped kneelers. The doorway has a blind fanlight, and the windows are sashes. |
| The Rosary; 54.39214°N 1.66641°W | — | Late 18th to early 19th century | The cottage is in stone, and has a pantile roof with stone coping and a shaped kneeler on the right. There are two storeys and one bay. The doorway is on the right and the windows are sashes, the ground floor window with a flat arch. |
| Bridge Farmhouse; 54.39058°N 1.65164°W | — | Early 19th century | The farmhouse is in rendered stone with a pantile roof. There are two storeys, a double depth plan, and three bays. The doorway has an architrave and the windows are sashes, those in the upper floor horizontally-sliding. |
| Farm buildings, Bridge Farm; 54.39038°N 1.65150°W | — | Early 19th century | The farm buildings are in sandstone and cobble, with some brick dressings, and have roofs of sandstone and pantile. They form ranges around three sides of a yard, open to the south, and have differing rooflines. |
| Cow byre, Sundial House; 54.39262°N 1.66681°W | — | Early 19th century | The cow byre is in stone and brick, with brick quoins, and a pantile roof with a ball finial. There are two storeys, and the openings include two doorways, one converted into a window, and a pitching opening. In the right gable end are openings with pointed arches, and pigeon ledges. |
| Walls, gateway and garden buildings, Brompton Grange; 54.39107°N 1.66772°W | — | Early to mid 19th century | The walls enclosing the garden are in stone with slab coping. The main gateway is flanked by chamfered rusticated stone piers that are plain, with hemispherical cast iron finials. The carriage gates and side gates are in wrought iron, and the lattice gate posts are in cast iron. The gateway is flanked by convex quadrant walls. In the southwest corner is a summerhouse with a curved rear wall, and a canted front containing round arches with keystones, over which is a slab cornice on brackets, and a coped parapet. Inside it is a three-sided seat. The garden shed in the southeast corner has blind round-arched openings on two sides. |
| Gate, gate posts and railings, Grange Lea; 54.39131°N 1.66780°W | — | Early to mid 19th century | The gate is in wrought iron, and has horizontal rails, ogee braces and a scroll. The gate piers are in cast iron, and are hollow with a square plan, a lattice design, and concave pyramidal tops. The railings extend for about 5 metres (16 ft), and have spear finials to the bars and pineapple finials to the standards. |
| West End; 54.39214°N 1.66983°W | — | Early to mid 19th century | Two cottages combined into one, in stone, with quoins and a roof of pantile and tile. There are two storeys and three bays, the right bay slightly higher and projecting slightly. The openings consist of a doorway and sash windows with deep cemented lintels and stone sills. |
| St Paul's Church; 54.39224°N 1.66956°W | | 1838 | The church was built as a chapel of ease, and has been partly used as a schoolroom. It is in stone with a Welsh slate roof, and consists of a two-bay nave with a north porch, and a higher two-bay chancel with a south vestry. On the west gable is a bellcote with Baroque-style coping. |
| Brompton Grange; 54.39131°N 1.66732°W | — | c. 1850 | A small country house in stone on a plinth containing decorative grills, with sandstone dressings, chamfered rusticated quoins, a modillion cornice, and a hipped Westmorland slate roof. There are two storeys and attics, three bays, and a later recessed service wing on the left. On the front is a portico with fluted Corinthian columns, a frieze with a dentilled cornice and a blocking course, and a round-arched doorway in a recessed architrave with a radial fanlight, Doric pilaster capitals, and a console keystone. In the outer bays are French windows in architraves with cornices on consoles. At the rear is a semicircular staircase projection. |
| Milepost; 54.38981°N 1.65161°W | | Late 19th century | The milepost on the east side of Gatherley Road is in cast iron, with a triangular plan and a sloping top. On the top is inscribed "HANG EAST HD", on the left side is the distance to Catterick, and on the right side the distance to Piercebridge. |
| War memorial 54.39190°N 1.66097°W | — | After 1919 | The war memorial, which stands in a grassed area, is in granite, and consists of a Celtic cross. It stands on a base, on a single limestone step, within a kerbed area. On the south face of the base is an inscription and the names of those lost in the First World War, and on the east face is also an inscription, and the names of those lost in the Second World War. |
