= Listed buildings in Gilling with Hartforth and Sedbury =

Gilling with Hartforth and Sedbury is a civil parish in the county of North Yorkshire, England. It contains 97 listed buildings that are recorded in the National Heritage List for England. Of these, one is listed at Grade I, the highest of the three grades, two are at Grade II*, the middle grade, and the others are at Grade II, the lowest grade. The parish contains the villages of Gilling West and Hartforth, Sedbury Park, and the surrounding countryside. Most of the listed buildings are houses, cottages and associated structures, farmhouses and farm buildings. The others include a church, items in the churchyard, two bridges, follies, a public house, a former school, a milepost, and a former water point.

== Key ==
Grade	Criteria
I	Buildings of exceptional interest, sometimes considered to be internationally important
II*	Particularly important buildings of more than special interest
II	Buildings of national importance and special interest

== Buildings ==
Name and location	Photograph	Date	Notes	Grade
St Agatha's Church; 54.44149°N 1.72091°W		Late 11th century	The church has been altered and extended through the centuries, including the addition of an outer north aisle in 1845 by Bonomi and Cory. It is built in stone and has roofs of Welsh slate, stone slate and lead. The church consists of a nave with a clerestory, a south aisle, a south porch, inner and outer north aisles, a chancel with a north vestry, and a west tower. The tower has three stages, a five-sided south stair turret with a pyramidal roof, chamfered bands, a three-light west window, a clock face on the east side, straight-headed bell openings, an embattled parapet, and a central weathercock.	I
Medieval coffin 54.44138°N 1.72092°W	—	Medieval	The coffin is in the churchyard of St Agatha's Church to the east of the porch. It is in sandstone and hewn out of solid rock, the body cavity tapering evenly from head to feet. The coffin is partly damaged.	II
The Curtain; 54.44161°N 1.71866°W	—	14th century (probable)	A row of three cottages, later two houses, that have served other purposes through the centuries. They are in sandstone, with quoins, and a pantile roof with stone slates at the eaves, coping on the right, and a gable with reversed crowstepping. There are two storeys and six bays. On the front is a porch, casement windows and a blocked fire window. At the rear is the head of an earlier window with two pointed arches, and in the right return are two blocked windows with pointed arches.	II
Gilling Bridge; 54.44233°N 1.71873°W		15th century	The bridge carries High Street (B6274 road) over Gilling Beck, and was rebuilt in 1799. It is in stone and consists of three segmental arches dating from 1799, the voussoirs on archivolt bands, on triangular cutwaters. Further to the south is a small dry arch dating from the 15th century.	II
Gateway to Hartforth Hall; 54.45258°N 1.73826°W		15th century	The gateway consists of a stone arch crossing the drive. It is made from fragments of a medieval chapel, and has a four-centred arch with two orders. Above the arch is a small window, and low walls extend to the south.	II
Crabtree House; 54.44278°N 1.74300°W	—	Late 17th century	The house is in stone and cobbles, and has a pantile roof with raised verges on the left. There are two storeys and four bays. The central doorway has a quoined chamfered surround. On the front are blocked two-light mullioned windows, and inserted square windows with deep lintels.	II
Oakwood House; 54.44048°N 1.71941°W	—	Late 17th century	The house is in stone, and has a pantile roof with stone slates at the eaves, stone coping and shaped kneelers. There are three storeys and four bays. The doorway has Tuscan half-columns, an Ionic entablature and a cornice. The ground and middle floors contain sash windows, and in the top floor are small windows with chamfered surrounds. In the middle floor is a blocked chamfered mullioned window.	II
The Old Parsonage; 54.44422°N 1.71613°W	—	Late 17th century	The house is in stone, with quoins, and a pantile roof with stone coping. There are two storeys and a cruciform plan with three bays, a projecting central two-story porch at the front, and a central stair tower at the rear. The doorway has a fanlight, the windows are sashes, and all the openings have flat brick arches. Recessed on the right at the rear is a later extension with a stone slate roof.	II
Stable north of 122 High Street, Gilling West; 54.44428°N 1.71587°W	—	Late 17th to early 18th century	An outbuilding, later a stable, in stone, with quoins, and a pantile roof with raised verges and reversed crowstepping. There are two storeys and three bays. In the centre is a stable door with a chamfered quoined surround, a window, a hayloft window, and blocked openings. On the right are external steps.	II
11 Millgate, Gilling West; 54.44070°N 1.71794°W	—	Late 17th to early 18th century	The house is in stone, with quoins, and a pantile roof with stone slate at the eaves, stone coping and shaped kneelers. There are two storeys and three bays. The central doorway has a chamfered surround. The ground floor windows are sashes with chamfered jambs, and in the upper floor are casement windows with chamfered surrounds. In the right return are four windows with chamfered surrounds.	II
Churchyard gates and gate piers 54.44124°N 1.71946°W	—	Late 17th to early 18th century	At the entrance to the churchyard of St Agatha's Church are three chamfered rusticated and quoined gate piers, with chamfered bases, moulded cornices and ogee caps. Between them are wrought iron gates dating from about 1807, with spear finials.	II
50, 52, 54, 56 and 58 High Street, Gilling West; 54.44114°N 1.71900°W	—	Early 18th century	A group of cottages in stone, with quoins, and pantile roofs with raised verges and reversed crowstepping. There are two storeys and an L-shaped plan, with two bays facing south and three facing west. The windows are sashes, those at the rear horizontally-sliding. All the openings have segmental brick arches.	II
87 High Street, Gilling West; 54.44374°N 1.71777°W	—	Early 18th century	The house is in stone, with quoins, and a pantile roof with stone slates at the eaves, and a raised verge on the left with reversed crowstepping. There are two storeys, two bays, and a rear outshut. The doorway and the windows, which are horizontally-sliding sashes, have deep lintels.	II
94, 98 and 102 High Street, Gilling West; 54.44348°N 1.71750°W		Early 18th century	Six, later three, cottages, in stone, with quoins, and a pantile roof with stone slates at the eaves, and raised verges and reversed crowstepping on the left. There is a single storey, and on the front are three doorways, three blocked doorways and horizontally-sliding sash windows.	II
5, 7 and 9 Millgate, Gilling West; 54.44063°N 1.71829°W		Early 18th century (probable)	A row of three cottages, they are in stone, and have a pantile roof with stone slates at the eaves, and stone coping. There is a single storey, and each cottage consists of a central doorway flanked by sash windows. All the openings have deep lintels.	II
20 High Street, Gilling West; 54.44007°N 1.71951°W		1735	Two houses combined into one, it is in stone with quoins and a concrete tile roof. There are three storeys and three bays. The central doorway has a lintel with a keystone flanked by panels inscribed with initials and the date. In the ground floor are slightly bowed recessed casement windows, and the upper floors contain sash windows.	II
39 and 41 High Street, Gilling West; 54.44018°N 1.71997°W	—	1735	Two houses in sandstone with quoins and two storeys. The main house has three bays, and a stone slate roof with stone coping and broken kneelers. It contains two doorways with quoined surrounds, the left doorway with a dated and initialled lintel. The windows are sashes with raised surrounds. The bay to the left has a pantile roof with stone slates at the eaves, and contains a segmental-arched carriageway with a sash window above.	II
12 High Street, Gilling West; 54.43980°N 1.71948°W	—	Early to mid 18th century	The house is roughcast and has a pantile roof with stone slates at the eaves. There are two storeys and two bays. The central doorway has a chamfered surround and a timber gabled hood, and the windows are sashes.	II
14 High Street, Gilling West; 54.43988°N 1.71948°W	—	Early to mid 18th century	The house is in stone and has a pantile roof with stone slates at the eaves and raised verges. There are two storeys and two bays. The central doorway has a chamfered surround and a timber gabled hood, and the windows are sashes.	II
16 and 18 High Street, Gilling West; 54.43999°N 1.71951°W		Early to mid 18th century	A pair of roughcast cottages that have a pantile roof with stone slates at the eaves and stone coping on the right. There are two storeys and each cottage has one bay. On the left of each cottage is a doorway, the right doorway with a gabled hood, and the windows are sashes.	II
38 High Street, Gilling West; 54.44059°N 1.71935°W	—	Early to mid 18th century	The house is in stone and has a concrete tile roof with stone slates at the eaves. There are three storeys and three bays. The central doorway has a raised stone surround with splayed bases. It is flanked by 12-pane fixed-light windows, in the middle floor are 12-pane windows with openings lights, and in the top floor are smaller shuttered openings. All the openings apart from those in the outer bays of the top floor have raised stone surrounds.	II
43 High Street, Gilling West; 54.44028°N 1.72003°W		Early to mid 18th century	The house is in sandstone, with quoins on the right, a moulded cornice, and a pantile roof with stone coping on the right. The doorway on the left has a quoined surround, and the windows are sashes with raised stone surrounds.	II
84 High Street, Gilling West; 54.44290°N 1.71813°W	—	Early to mid 18th century	The house is in sandstone, with quoins, and a pantile roof with stone slates at the eaves, and stone coping and shaped kneelers on the right. There are three storeys and four bays. In the third bay is a doorway with a quoined surround, and to its right is a garage door. The windows are sashes, those in the lower two floors with deep lintels.	II
88 High Street, Gilling West; 54.44306°N 1.71795°W	—	Early to mid 18th century	The house is in stone, with quoins, and a pantile roof with stone slates at the eaves, and stone coping and a shaped kneeler on the left. There are two storeys, five bays, and a lower bay on the left. The doorway has a quoined surround, and the windows are sashes in raised stone surrounds.	II
Bell Park Pavilion; 54.43695°N 1.73765°W		Early to mid 18th century	A folly to the south of Gillingwood Hall, it is in sandstone, with two storeys and a square plan with sides of one bay. On each side are rusticated quoin strips ending in cornice capitals. In the upper floor on each side is a round-arched opening with a chamfered surround and an archivolt with a keystone containing acanthus and egg and dart motifs, above which is a broken segmental pediment.	II
Summerhouse southwest of Gillingwood Hall; 54.43699°N 1.73896°W	—	Early to mid 18th century	The summerhouse is in sandstone, and has roofs of Welsh and Westmorland slate. It has a T-shaped plan, and is set into a hillside. There are two storeys, a rusticated basement at the front, and three bays. The middle bay on the front has four unfluted Roman Doric columns, a full entablature and a pediment. On each side is a shell niche, and above it is a cornice and a hipped roof. The rear has quoins, and the middle bay is open with an apsidal rear wall. Above is an open pediment containing an oculus flanked by shell niches.	II*
Entrance to Old Gillingwood Hall; 54.43766°N 1.73816°W	—	Early to mid 18th century	The entrance consists of the former front doorway of the hall set into a wall. It has a rounded arch, and an archivolt rising from capitals. This is surrounded by fluted Roman Doric engaged columns, and a Doric entablature with guttae, triglyphs, metopes with paterae, and mutules with an acanthus motif, surmounted by a pediment. The stone wall extends for about 1 metre (3 ft 3 in) on each side, and part of a window survives in the right wall.	II
Hartforth Hall; 54.45316°N 1.73909°W		1744	A country house that has been extended, it is in sandstone with a Westmorland slate roof and two storeys. The south front has eight bays, a plinth, quoins, a floor band, a modillion cornice, a balustered parapet with square pedestals, and urn finials at the ends. Three of the bays project slightly, and contain a doorway with an architrave, a fanlight, and a tripartite keystone in a rusticated quoined surround, with a pediment. The windows are sashes in architraves. The left return has ten bays, and contains a two-storey bow window. The right return has seven bays, and contains a tetrastyle prostyle Doric portico.	II*
24 and 26 High Street, Gilling West; 54.44017°N 1.71953°W	—	Mid 18th century	A pair of houses in stone with a concrete tile roof. There are two storeys and four bays. On the front are two doorways, the left with a quoined surround. Above the left doorway is a narrow two-light window, and the other windows are sashes.	II
45 High Street, Gilling West; 54.44033°N 1.72005°W		Mid 18th century	The house is in stone, with quoins on the right, and a stone slate roof with stone coping and a shaped kneeler on the right. There are two storeys and one bay. The doorway on the left has a raised stone surround, and the windows are sashes with wedge lintels.	II
86 High Street, Gilling West; 54.44298°N 1.71807°W	—	Mid 18th century	The house is in stone, and has a pantile roof with stone slates at the eaves. There are two storeys and two bays. The central doorway has a chamfered quoined surround, and to the extreme left is a passage door. The windows are sashes in raised stone surrounds.	II
101 and 103 High Street, Gilling West; 54.44460°N 1.71678°W	—	Mid 18th century	Two houses, later combined, in stone, the right two bays rendered, with a pantile roof, and stone coping and a shaped kneeler on the right. There are two storeys, three bays, and a rear outshut with a catslide roof. On the front are two doorways, and sash windows, those in the left bay with deep lintels.	II
26 Millgate, Gilling West; 54.44005°N 1.71765°W	—	Mid 18th century	Two houses combined into one, in sandstone, with quoins, and a pantile roof with stone coping and shaped kneelers. There are two storeys and four bays. On the front is a doorway with slightly-chamfered interrupted jambs, and to its right is a casement window inserted into a previous doorway. The other ground floor windows are casements, the upper floor contains horizontally-sliding sash windows, and all the openings have deep lintels.	II
Farm buildings north of Crabtree House; 54.44301°N 1.74303°W	—	18th century (probable)	The farm buildings are in stone, the oldest is a barn, and the others were added in the late 19h century. The barn has quoins, and a Welsh slate roof with stone coping and shaped kneelers. There are two storeys and four bays. Projecting from the barn on the west is a single-storey engine house with a pantile roof and stone slate at the eaves, and to its north is a square chimney. To the north of the barn is a two-storey range with an L-shaped plan and a clay tile roof, containing calf boxes and a granary above. Projecting from it is a single-storey cart shed with four segmental-arched openings.	II
Gillingwood Hall; 54.43783°N 1.73802°W		18th century	A farmhouse on the site of a previous mansion, in stone, with a T-shaped plan. The main block has two storeys, three bays, and a stone slate roof with stone coping. It has a sill band, and in the centre is a re-used doorcase with an architrave and a fanlight, over which is a blank panel, and a pediment on consoles, and in the upper floor are sash windows. To the right is a lower two-storey bay that has a pantile roof with stone slates at the eaves. Further to the right is a single-storey bay, and at the rear is a wing on the right.	II
Bastioned wall, Gillingwood Hall; 54.43735°N 1.73709°W		18th century	The wall is in stone, and runs for about 75 metres (246 ft) towards the west from the hall, and turns at ninety degrees to the southwest for about 60 metres (200 ft). It contains three bastions, each about 2 metres (6 ft 7 in) in width, projecting from the wall. Two have a rectangular plan, the central bastion has a bowed front, and there is a small bastion on the corner.	II
Group of three tombstones 54.44125°N 1.72094°W	—	Mid 18th century	The tombstones are in a row in the churchyard of St Agatha's Church. They consist of sandstone slabs, with different designs and inscriptions. The left tombstone has a wave-shaped top, the middle one has a segmental-scrolled top, and the top of the right tombstone has an open pediment on moulded corbels.	II
White Swan Inn; 54.44059°N 1.71983°W		Mid 18th century	The public house is rendered, and the main block has three storeys and two bays. It has a plinth, a floor band, a central doorway with a stone surround and splayed bases, sash windows and a pantile roof. To the right is a later range with two storeys and two bays. It contains a segmental-arched carriage way on the right and sash windows, and has a Welsh slate roof.	II
Moore memorial 54.44130°N 1.72093°W	—	c. 1758	The memorial is a sandstone tombstone in the churchyard of St Agatha's Church. It has a triangular head, and contains a bronze plaque framed by fluted pilasters, and an open pediment containing various carved motifs. On the west side are an angel's head and wings in bas relief and a verse.	II
Waller memorial 54.44134°N 1.72079°W	—	c. 1764	The memorial in the churchyard of St Agatha's Church consists of a sandstone tombstone. It is a slab with a scrolled top, and on the east side is an egg-and-dart motif on the upper edge, with three paterae in the centre, and crossed acanthus fronds. Below is a frame with a moulded surround containing an inscription. On the west side is a verse.	II
44 High Street and 1 Millgate, Gilling West; 54.44092°N 1.71923°W	—	Mid to late 18th century	A house with an outbuilding forming two dwellings. It is in sandstone, and has a pantile roof with stone slates at the eaves, and stone coping and a shaped kneeler on the right. There are two storeys and two bays. On the front is a doorway, and there is another entrance in an outbuilding. The windows in the left bay are sashes, and in the right bay they are casements.	II
46 High Street, Gilling West; 54.44099°N 1.71921°W	—	Mid to late 18th century	The house is in sandstone, with quoins on the left, and a pantile roof with stone coping and a shaped kneeler on the left. There are two storeys and two bays. The doorway is on the centre, to its right is a canted bay window, and the other widows are sashes.	II
108, 110 and 112 High Street, Gilling West; 54.44385°N 1.71709°W	—	Mid to late 18th century	Four, later three, cottages, they are in stone, and have pantile roofs with stone slates at the eaves, stone coping and shaped kneelers. There are two storeys and four bays. On the front are three doorways, one blocked doorway, and sash windows. All the openings have deep lintels.	II
Bank View; 54.44313°N 1.71848°W	—	Mid to late 18th century	Two cottages combined into one house, it is in stone, with quoins on the left, and a pantile roof with stone slates at the eaves, and stone coping and a shaped kneeler on the left. The central doorway has a blind fanlight containing tracery with three pointed arches, and an open pediment. The windows are horizontally-sliding sashes with three lights.	II
Sedbury Park Farmhouse; 54.43690°N 1.70168°W	—	Mid to late 18th century	The farmhouse is in roughcast stone, and has a stone slate roof with stone coping. There is a central range of three storeys and three bays, and flanking two-storey single-bay wings. The central round-headed doorway has imposts, a fanlight and an open pediment. The windows are sashes, those in the right wing horizontally-sliding.	II
Bridge End Cottage; 54.44214°N 1.71855°W	—	Late 18th century (probable)	The cottage is in stone, with quoins, and a pantile roof with stone coping. There are two storeys, and an L-shaped plan, with a front range of two bays. The doorway is in the centre, to its right is a canted bay window, and the other windows are sashes. The openings have plain stone lintels.	II
Garden walls, Hartforth Hall; 54.45580°N 1.74165°W	—	Late 18th century (probable)	The walls enclose a garden with an irregular quadrangular plan, the north and south walls were heated. The north, south and west walls are in brick with stone slate coping, the north and south walls containing segmental-arched openings. The east wall is in stone with swept tops, and includes workshops and bothies.	II
Barn and wheel-house, Home Farm; 54.45113°N 1.73731°W	—	Late 18th century	The barn is the older, and is in cobble, with quoins, and a hipped stone slate roof. There are two storeys and four bays, and it contains a central doorway and slit vents. The horse engine house was added to the south in the mid-19th century. It has a single storey, four sides, and a Welsh slate roof. The sides are open, and there are piers at the angles.	II
Icehouse; 54.44395°N 1.69663°W	—	Late 18th century	The ice house in Sedbury Park is in brown brick. It has a circular plan, a deep well and a tall domed vault. The entrance has a round arched doorway, and a barrel vaulted passage leads to a small inner doorway.	II
Stable block north of Sedbury Hall; 54.44158°N 1.69643°W	—	Late 18th century	The former stables and coach house are in sandstone on a plinth, with quoins and stone slate roofs, and they form a U-shaped plan. The central coach house projects and has two storeys and three bays. It contains an arcade of three round arches, with voussoirs, abaci, piers and responds, and in front is a glass canopy on cast iron columns, with a hipped roof. In the upper floor are sash windows and an eaves band, the roof is hipped, and at the rear is a round-arched carriageway. The coach house is flanked by single-storey three-bay ranges and end wings projecting to the south. In the left wing is a re-set achievement, and in the right wing is a cartouche with a coat of arms.	II
Rock Castle; 54.44974°N 1.71602°W		c. 1793	A farmhouse divided into two, in sandstone, with quoins, and an artificial stone slate roof with stone coping and shaped kneelers. There are two storeys, and a U-shaped plan, with a front range of four bays, the middle two bays projecting slightly under a gable containing a lunette. The doorway has a fanlight, and the windows are sashes with projecting sills and deep lintels.	II
The Rock; 54.43659°N 1.69320°W	—	1797	A folly, partly ruined, in sandstone. It consists of a two-storey circular tower enclosed by an octagonal single-storey base. The tower contains four pointed-arched openings with voussoirs, and inside there is an upper room with a saucer dome. The side walls had embattled parapets.	II
10 High Street, Gilling West; 54.43973°N 1.71948°W	—	Late 18th to early 19th century	The cottage is in stone, with quoins on the right, and a pantile roof with stone slates at the eaves. There are two storeys and one bay. On the left is a doorway, and the windows are casements.	II
28 High Street, Gilling West; 54.44025°N 1.71951°W	—	Late 18th to early 19th century	The house is in stone, and has a pantile roof with stone slates at the eaves, stone coping and shaped kneelers. There are two storeys and two bays. On the right is a doorway, there is a blocked doorway in the centre, and the windows are sashes. Above the ground floor openings is a continuous timber lintel.	II
30 High Street, Gilling West; 54.44032°N 1.71949°W	—	Late 18th to early 19th century	The house is in stone on a plinth, with quoins on the left, and a pantile roof with stone slates at the eaves and a shaped kneeler on the left. There are two storeys and two bays. In the centre is a doorway with a fanlight, and to the left is a passage doorway with a chamfered surround. The windows are sashes with projecting sills and deep lintels.	II
73 and 75 High Street, Gilling West; 54.44305°N 1.71857°W		Late 18th to early 19th century	A pair of houses in sandstone, with quoins on the left, and a stone slate roof with stone coping on the left. On the front are two doorways with raised stone surrounds on splayed bases, and the windows are sashes with projecting sills and deep lintels.	II
82 High Street, Gilling West; 54.44281°N 1.71822°W	—	Late 18th to early 19th century	Two houses combined into one, in stone, with quoins, and a pantile roof with stone slate at the eaves and a raised verge to the right. There are two storeys and four bays. In the left bay is a doorway with a quoined surround, in the third bay is a blocked doorway, and above it is a blocked window. In the other bays are canted bay windows, and the upper floor contains sash windows.	II
90 High Street, Gilling West; 54.44318°N 1.71784°W	—	Late 18th to early 19th century	A cottage in sandstone, with quoins, and a stone slate roof with some artificial slates, and stone coping on the right. There are two storeys and two bays. The doorway on the left has a quoined chamfered surround, to its left is a small window, and the other windows are sashes. In the right return is a blocked doorway with a quoined surround.	II
15, 17, and 21 Millgate, Gilling West; 54.43975°N 1.71700°W	—	Late 18th to early 19th century	Four, later three, cottages in stone, with quoins, and pantile roofs with stone slates at the eaves, stone coping and shaped kneelers. There are two storeys and three bays. On the front are three doorways with quoined surrounds, the right two are paired. The windows are sashes, and most openings have deep lintels.	II
23 Millgate, Gilling West; 54.43965°N 1.71688°W	—	Late 18th to early 19th century	The house is in stone, with quoins on the right, and a pantile roof with stone coping and shaped kneelers. There are two storeys and three bays. The doorway is in the centre and above it is a blind window. The windows are sashes, and the ground floor openings have deep lintels.	II
Blackhill Folly; 54.45760°N 1.73106°W	—	Late 18th to early 19th century	A fold yard for cattle in stone with pantile roofs. It consists of three single-storey ranges around a courtyard, the south side enclosed by a screen wall, which wall contains three gables joined by walls. Each gable has quoins and an embattled parapet, and contains a recessed rendered pointed opening flanked by blind loopholes. The north range is taller than the others, and contains three semicircular-arched openings.	II
Bridge End Barn; 54.44261°N 1.71838°W	—	Late 18th to early 19th century	A house, at one time an agricultural building, in colourwashed roughcast stone, with quoins, and a stone slate roof with stone coping on the right. There are two storeys and three bays. The doorway is in the centre, and there are two square windows in each floor.	II
Bridge End Farmhouse; 54.44270°N 1.71832°W	—	Late 18th to early 19th century	A farmhouse and a cottage combined into a house, it is in stone with a concrete tile roof. There are two storeys and four bays, the right bay recessed. In the left bay is a carriageway, and the recessed bay contains a doorway with a chamfered quoined surround. The windows are sashes, most with raised stone surrounds.	II
Corner Cottage; 54.44080°N 1.71924°W	—	Late 18th to early 19th century	The cottage is in stone, with quoins on the left, and a Welsh slate roof with stone coping on the left. There are two storeys and two bays. The central doorway has a fluted frieze, paterae and a cornice. It is flanked by canted bay windows, and in the upper floor are casement windows.	II
Easingtown Barn; 54.45084°N 1.73464°W	—	Late 18th to early 19th century	The building has loose boxes on the ground floor and a granary above. It is in stone on a plinth, with quoins, and a stone slate roof with stone coping and a weathervane . There are two storeys and two bays. The doorway has a quoined surround, and the ground floor windows have pointed arches. The windows in the upper floor have segmental-pointed flat-arched lintels. The doorway at the rear has a pointed arch and a fanlight.	II
Garden Cottages; 54.44408°N 1.69583°W	—	Late 18th to early 19th century	An orangery and fruit house converted into two cottages, the building is in sandstone with embattled parapets and hipped slate roofs. It is in one and two storeys and has a total of 15 bays, in a half-ellipse plan. The ground floor openings have pointed-arched heads, and in the upper floor are sash windows.	II
Gilling West Post Office; 54.44066°N 1.71932°W		Late 18th to early 19th century	A house and a shop in sandstone, with quoins, and a concrete tile roof with stone slates at the eaves, stone coping, and kneelers. There are two storeys and three bays. On the left of the ground floor is a shop window incorporating a postbox. To the right is a shopfront consisting of a central doorway with a fanlight, flanked by pilasters with fluted moulded corbels with paterae, and square bay windows. In the top floor are sash windows with deep lintels scored as voussoirs.	II
Cow byre, Paddock Plantation; 54.43501°N 1.69574°W	—	Late 18th to early 19th century	The cow byre is roughcast, with stone dressings, and a roof of slate and corrugated sheet. There are three bays, the middle bay with two storeys and the outer bays each with one storey. The middle bay has a pitched gable with embattled coping, and contains a doorway with a pointed arch and a band, above which is a quatrefoil. The outer bays contain vents, and he right bay has a parapet.	II
Sedbury East Farmhouse; 54.43272°N 1.68686°W	—	Late 18th to early 19th century	The farmhouse is roughcast, and has an artificial stone slate roof with stone coping. There are three storeys and four bays. The windows are sashes, and the entrance is at the rear.	II
The Gables; 54.44023°N 1.71804°W	—	Late 18th to early 19th century	A stone house with quoins, and a stone slate roof with shaped kneelers and stone coping. There are two storeys, three bays, and a rear outshut. The central doorway has a stone surround with impost blocks, above it is a small casement window, and the other windows are sashes with projecting sills and deep lintels.	II
The Lodge and railings 54.44372°N 1.68246°W		Late 18th to early 19th century	The lodge at the entrance to Sedbury Park is in sandstone on a plinth, with a floor band, a cornice, a moulded gutter box, and a hipped stone slate roof. There are two storeys and three bays. The middle bay projects slightly, and contains a round-arched doorway with a rusticated, chamfered quoined surround and a vermiculated keystone, and in the upper floor is a pediment. The windows are sashes, those in the ground floor in round-arched recesses. In front of the lodge are wrought iron railings with small knob finials, turned baluster standards, and matching gates.	II
The Old Vicarage; 54.44112°N 1.72016°W	—	c. 1803	The vicarage, later a private house, is in stone on a plinth, with quoins, and an artificial stone slate roof with stone coping. There are two storeys and five bays. In the centre is a Tuscan distyle portico with two columns and two pilasters, a cornice with a blocking course, and a doorway containing a fanlight with decorative glazing. The windows are sashes. At the rear is a doorway with an architrave, a frieze and a pediment.	II
Waterloo House; 54.44073°N 1.71927°W	—	c. 1815	The house is in sandstone, and has a pantile roof with stone slates at the eaves, and stone coping on the left. There are two storeys and two bays. The central doorway has a fanlight, and to the extreme right is a doorway with a chamfered quoined surround. The windows are sashes with projecting sills and deep lintels.	II
47 and 49 High Street, Gilling West; 54.44047°N 1.71988°W	—	Early 19th century	Two roughcast houses with a pantile roof and stone copings. There are two storeys and four bays. The doorway on the front has an architrave, a plain frieze, a cornice and a blocking course, and there is another entrance at the rear. The windows are sashes with projecting sills and deep lintels.	II
Bridge over Hartforth Beck; 54.45053°N 1.73869°W		Early 19th century (probable)	The bridge is in sandstone, and consists of three elliptical arches with triangular cutwaters. The parapet has a band, over which are square and rectangular balusters and segmental coping.	II
Brooms Field Barn; 54.45654°N 1.73477°W	—	Early 19th century (probable)	A hay barn in stone, with quoins, and a hipped Welsh slate roof. There are three bays, and a lower bay to the south. The main range contains three full-height flat-headed openings, the separating piers with quoins. The lower bay has an embattled gable.	II
Hay barn northeast of Easingtown Barn; 54.45098°N 1.73386°W	—	Early 19th century (probable)	The barn is in stone, with quoins, and a hipped Welsh slate roof. There are three bays, and a lean-to on the right. The main range contains three full-height flat-headed openings, the separating piers with quoins. The lean-to contains a doorway, and in the left return are slit vents.	II
Gatherley Moor Farmhouse; 54.45364°N 1.70533°W		Early 19th century	A farmhouse, later a private house, in sandstone with quoins and a hipped pantile roof. There are two storeys and a basement, and three bays. In the centre is a doorway with a fanlight, the windows are sashes, and all the openings have wedge lintels.	II
Hay barn north of Hartforth Hall; 54.45485°N 1.73930°W	—	Early 19th century (probable)	The barn is in stone, with quoins, and a hipped Welsh slate roof. There are three bays, flanked by a lean-to on each side. The main range contains three full-height flat-headed openings, the separating piers with quoins. Each lean-to has a door, a window, and slit vents.	II
Cart shed and granary, Home Farm; 54.45101°N 1.73703°W	—	Early 19th century	The building is in stone with quoins and a hipped stone slate roof. There are two storeys and five bays. On the front are two segmental-arched cart openings with voussoirs and piers, and two doorways with deep lintels. The upper floor contains square openings with projecting sills and deep lintels. At the rear, the middle three bays project slightly, and in each bay is a blind doorway with a flat arch.	II
No. 1 Harforth Village; 54.45166°N 1.73646°W	—	1830	The house is in stone, with quoins, and a hipped artificial stone roof. There are two storeys and five bays, the middle three bays projecting under a pediment containing an oval date plaque in the tympanum. The central doorway has Tuscan pilasters and an open pediment, and the windows are sashes with deep lintels.	II
Anteforth House and walls 54.43784°N 1.72005°W	—	Early to mid 19th century	The house is in sandstone, with quoins, and a pantile roof with stone slates at the eaves, and stone coping. There are two storeys and three bays. The central doorway has a fanlight, the windows are sashes, and all the openings have deep lintels. Attached on each side is a screen wall with coping, the right wall containing a round-arched carriageway.	II
Gilling Lodge; 54.43872°N 1.71962°W	—	Early to mid 19th century	The house is in stone, with quoins, and stone slate roofs with stone coping and shaped kneelers. The house has a U-shaped plan, the main block with two storeys and a loft, a double depth plan, and five bays. To the rear on the left is a two-storey service wing, and to the right is a single-storey range. The central doorway has an architrave and a fanlight, and the windows are sashes.	II
Gate piers to south drive of Hartforth Hall; 54.45141°N 1.73675°W	—	Early to mid 19th century	Flanking the entrance to the drive are two sandstone gate piers with a square plan. Each pier has a chamfered base, a square abacus, a convex top, and a ball finial.	II
Gate piers southeast of No. 1 Harforth Village; 54.45154°N 1.73632°W	—	Early to mid 19th century	Flanking the lane to the southeast of the house are two sandstone gate piers with a square plan. Each pier has a chamfered base, a square abacus, a convex top, and a ball finial.	II
Former school and school house 54.44412°N 1.71725°W		1847	The former school and master's house are in stone with Welsh slate roofs, and form an irregular cruciform plan. The gables have stone coping and shaped kneelers. The school has a single storey, with a main block of four bays, and a lower three-bay range to the right. The left bay is lower and recessed, and the third bay is projecting and gabled with a finial. These bays contain mullioned and transomed windows, and in the gable is a single-light window. In the left bay of the right range is a doorway with a hood mould and a single-light window to the right, and two-light mullioned windows in the other bays. The school house at the rear has two storeys, a doorway with a double-chamfered quoined surround and double-chamfered cross windows.	II
8 High Street, Gilling West; 54.43969°N 1.71968°W	—	Mid 19th century	The cottage is in stone, with quoins on the right, and a pantile roof with stone slates at the eaves and stone coping on the right. There are two storeys and one bay. On the left is a doorway in a gabled porch, and the windows are sashes with deep lintels.	II
15 and 17 High Street, Gilling West; 54.43856°N 1.72005°W	—	Mid 19th century	A pair of cottages in sandstone, with quoins, and a Welsh slate roof with stone coping. There are two storeys and two bays. The two doorways are in the centre, the windows are sashes, and all the openings have deep lintels.	II
92 High Street, Gilling West; 54.44323°N 1.71776°W	—	Mid 19th century	A house in stone, with two storeys, a main block of three bays and a lower bay on the left. The main block has a stone slate roof with stone coping, a central doorway with a chamfered quoined surround, and sash windows with deep lintels. The left bay has a pantile roof, and stone coping and a shaped kneeler on the left. It contains a garage door and a small pitched opening above.	II
Blacksmith's Forge; 54.44323°N 1.71776°W		Mid 19th century	The smithy is in stone, with quoins, and a Welsh slate roof with stone coping, and a wrought iron weathervane on the right, There is a single storey and three bays. In the centre is a stable door flanked by four-pane windows. At the rear is the former shoeing shop, with a pantile roof.	II
Stable courtyard north of Hartforth Hall; 54.45354°N 1.73887°W	—	Mid to late 19th century	The former coach houses and stables are in stone with a Westmorland slate roof, and are arranged around a quadrangle. In the east and west range are similar coach houses, each containing a segmental arch with a keystone, and with a hipped roof. The north stable range has two storeys and nine bays, and contains a central round-arched carriageway with imposts and a keystone. At the south is a range of buildings fronting on to the kitchen yard.	II
Former orangery and wall, Hartforth Hall; 54.45330°N 1.73858°W	—	Late 19th century	The orangery, now a ruin, has a rear wall in rendered stone with a semicircular recess in the centre. In front of it is a Tuscan colonnade with an entablature and a central entrance, and behind the columns are vertical iron posts. To the left is a sandstone screen wall with a balustraded parapet, containing a doorway with an architrave, a tripartite keystone, and a recessed panel to its right.	II
Water tower, Hartforth Hall; 54.45333°N 1.73880°W		Late 19th century	The tower is in stone, with a square plan and three stages. It contains quoins, bands, a cornice, and a parapet with ball finials on the corners. In the ground floor are two open round-arched openings with architraves and piers. The top stage contains a clock face on all sides, each in an oculus with a keystone.	II
Farm buildings northeast of Crabree House; 54.44289°N 1.74276°W	—	1881	The buildings consist of stables, a turnip house and a blacksmith's shop, later piggeries. They are in sandstone with quoins and roofs of clay tile and pantile. They have a single storey and are stepped down a hillside. The openings have quoined surrounds and rounded arrises, and include various doors and windows. In the right return is a recessed panel with the date, and a triangular pigeoncote.	II
Milepost; 54.43954°N 1.71959°W		c. 1890	The milepost on the east side of High Street (B6274 road) is in cast iron. It has a triangular plan and a sloping top. On the top is inscribed "RICHMOND H. D", and on the sides are pointing hands. On the left side is the distance to Richmond, and on the right side to Lucy Cross.	II
Former water point 54.44439°N 1.71646°W		1897	The former water point is in sandstone, and consists of a round-arched opening with a lintel, a keystone and recessed spandrels. This is surmounted by a segmental pediment with a moulded frame and the date in the tympanum. At the base, on each side, is a rounded stone. The opening is largely filled by a large block, on which is a cast iron animal mask. The attached wall is part of the enclosure of a former animal pound.	II
Fountain and wall, Hartforth Hall; 54.45320°N 1.73866°W	—	c. 1900	The wall is in sandstone, and forms a U-shaped plan, with steps and a balustrade. Between the lower flights of steps is a wall containing a shell niche with a pilastered architrave. This contains a male mask discharging water from the mouth into a circular basin, and is flanked by plain pilasters. Behind it is a wall with a chamfered parapet containing a central flight of steps.	II
