= Hartforth Hall =

Historic building in North Yorkshire, England

Coordinates: 54.4532°N 1.7391°W

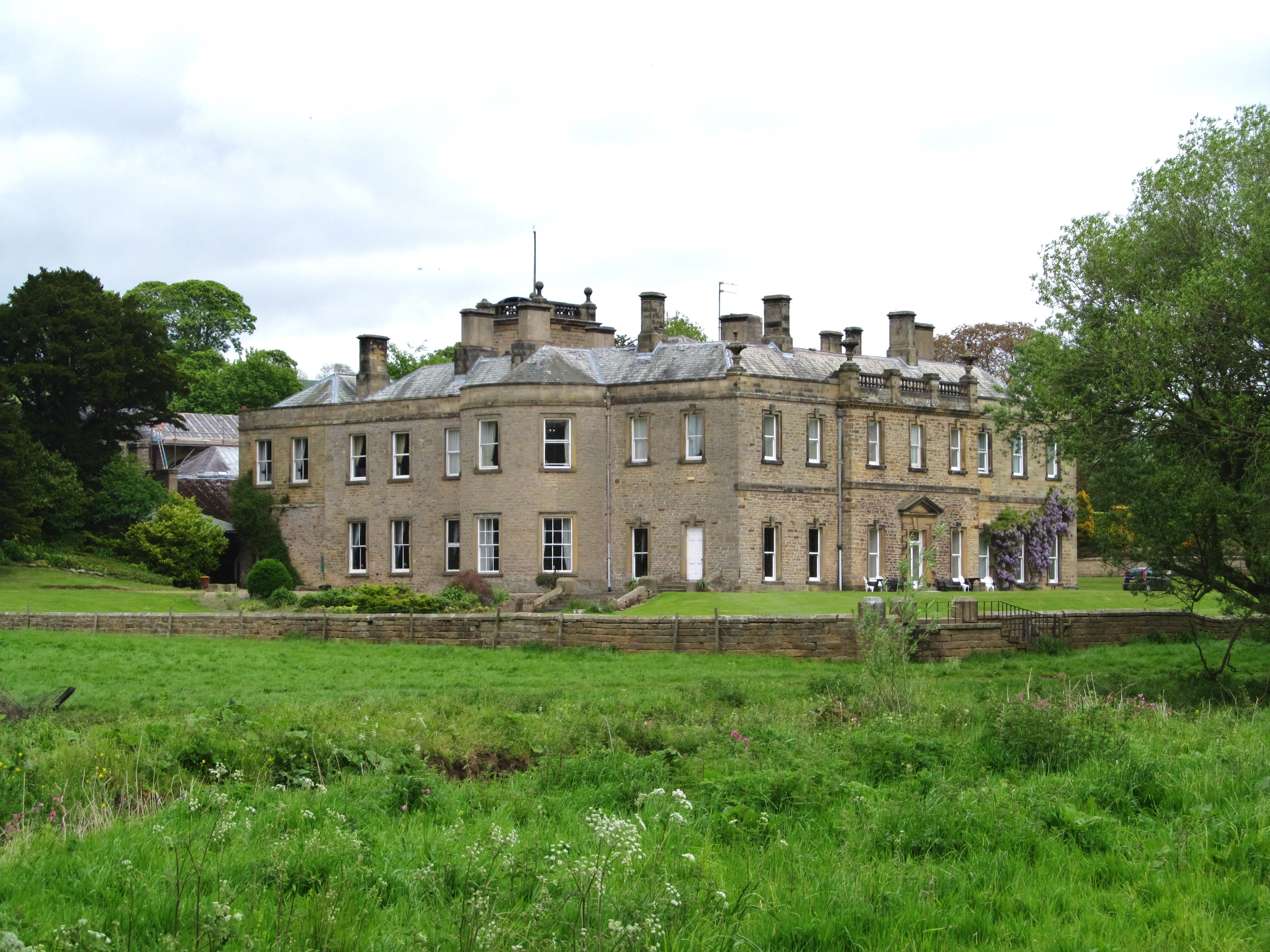
The building, in 2015

Hartforth Hall is a historic building in Hartforth, a village in North Yorkshire, in England.

The manor of Hartforth was recorded in the Domesday Book and descended through various families. The current country house was built in 1744, and a northwest range was added in 1792, probably to a design by John Foss. In about 1900, the right-hand bays were rebuilt and a new range added at that end. The building was grade II* listed in 1969. The house passed to Sheldon Cradock, MP for Camelford, whose grandson, Rear Admiral Christopher Cradock, was born at Hartforth in 1862 and who died at the Battle of Coronel. The property was operated as a hotel and wedding venue from 1986 to 2017, but the hotel is now permanently closed.

The house is built of sandstone with a Westmorland slate roof and it has two storeys. The south front has eight bays, a plinth, quoins, a floor band, a modillion cornice, a balustered parapet with square pedestals, and urn finials at the ends. Three of the bays project slightly, and contain a doorway with an architrave, a fanlight, and a tripartite keystone in a rusticated quoined surround, with a pediment. The windows are sashes in architraves. The left return has ten bays, and contains a two-storey bow window. The right return has seven bays, and contains a tetrastyle prostyle Doric portico. Inside, the south central ground floor room retains decoration from 1744, while the sitting room, bedroom above, and east staircase, all have decoration of 1792.

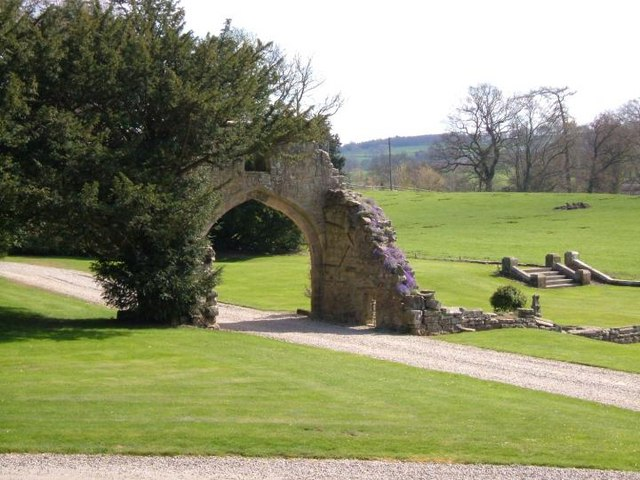
The gateway to the hall

The gateway to the hall consists of a stone arch crossing the drive. It is made from fragments of a medieval chapel, and has a four-centred arch with two orders. Above the arch is a small window, and low walls extend to the south. It is a grade II listed building.

Next to the house is a grade II listed water tower, dating from the late 19th century. The tower is built of stone, with a square plan and three stages. It contains quoins, bands, a cornice, and a parapet with ball finials on the corners. In the ground floor are two open round-arched openings with architraves and piers. The top stage contains a clock face on each side, all in oculi with keystones.

== See also ==
- Grade II* listed buildings in North Yorkshire (district)
- Listed buildings in Gilling with Hartforth and Sedbury
