= Gilling sword =

Anglo-Saxon sword, dating from the late 9th to early 10th centuries AD

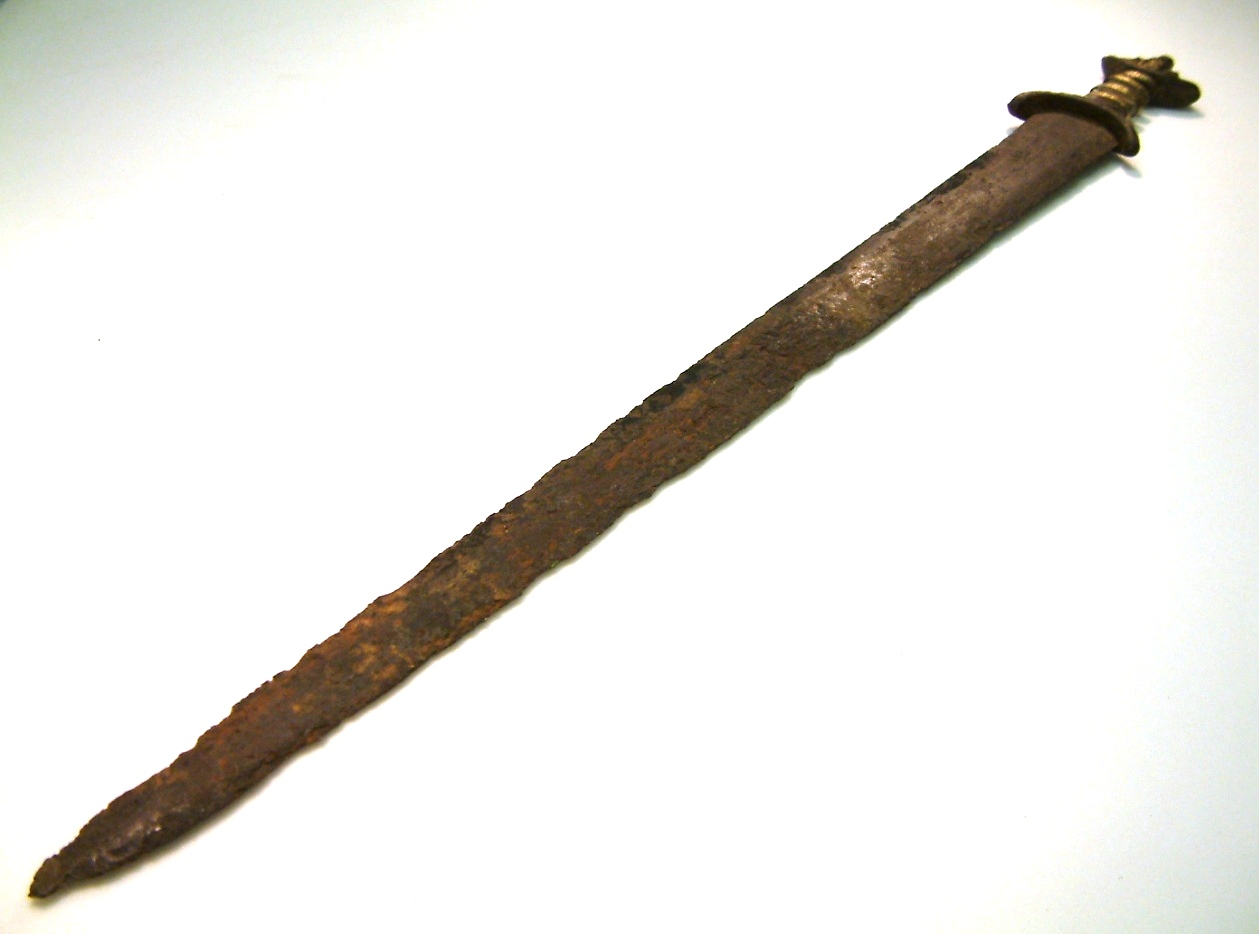
- The Gilling sword
- Size: 838 mm (length)
- Created: late 9th to early 10th Century AD
- Period/culture: Anglo-Saxon
- Discovered: 1976; Gilling West, North Yorkshire
- Present location: Medieval Gallery, Yorkshire Museum, York
- Identification: YORYM 1977.51

The Gilling sword is an Anglo-Saxon sword, dating from the late 9th to early 10th centuries AD, found by a schoolboy in a river in 1976 and subsequently acquired by the Yorkshire Museum.

== Discovery ==
The sword was discovered on 9 April 1976 by nine-year-old Gary Fridd on the north side of Gilling Beck, in Gilling West, North Yorkshire. At the Coroner's inquisition for treasure trove, held in September of the same year, a police officer identified the find spot as "33 feet (33 ft (10 m)) east of a bridge and two feet from the water's edge". He also identified that a mechanical excavator had recently been working in the area where the sword was found, offering a reason for its unusual discovery. The sword was not declared treasure and became the property of the finder. The finder appeared on the children's television programme Blue Peter to talk about his discovery and both he and the sword were awarded Blue Peter badges.

The sword was purchased at auction by the Yorkshire Museum in 1977.

== Description ==
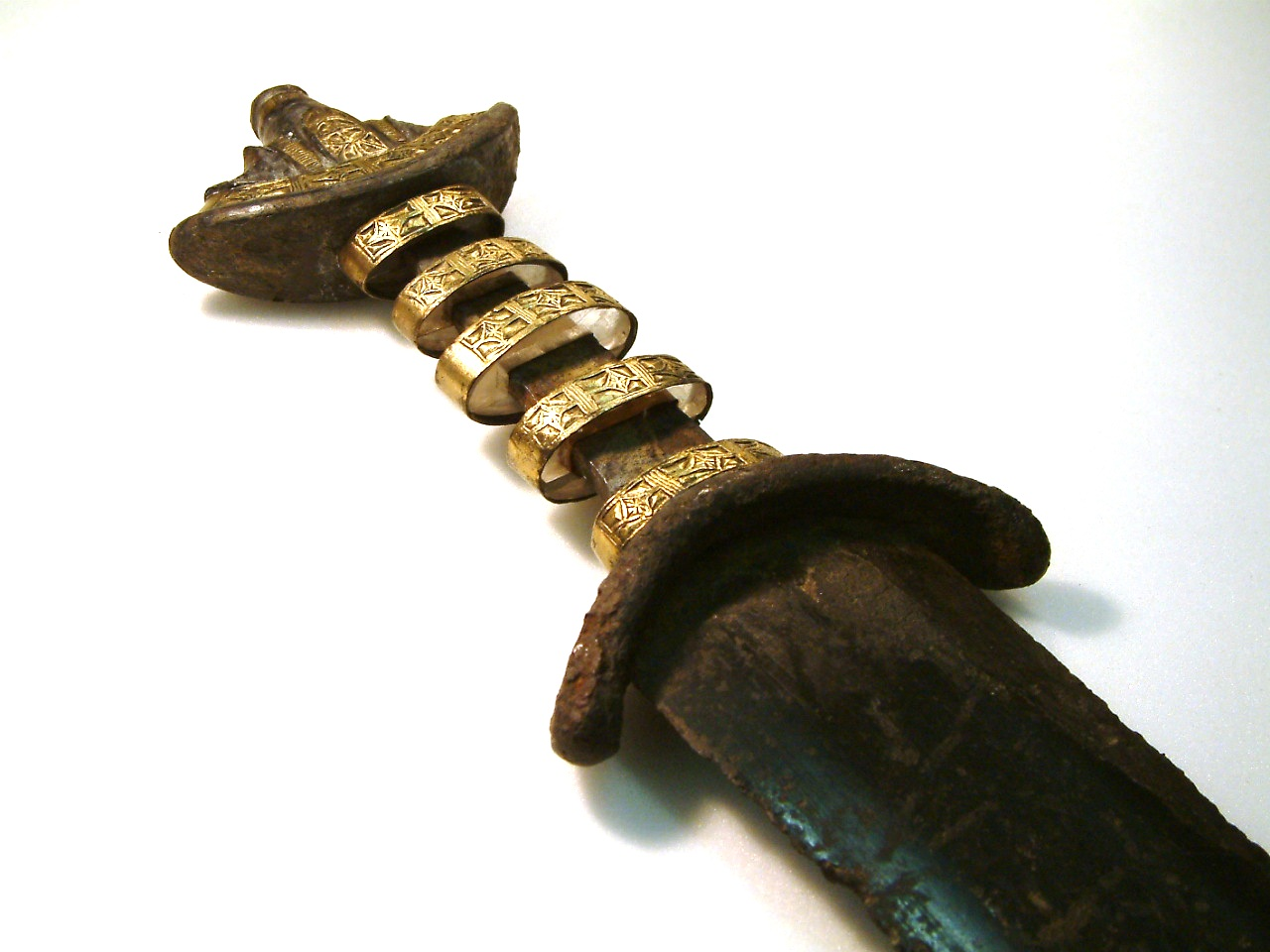
Detail of the decoration on the hilt

The whole sword measures 838 millimetres (33.0 in) in length, with a maximum width of 86 millimetres (3.4 in) across the guard. The sword blade is bifacial (double edged) and the hilt is decorated in silver with a combination of geometric and floriate (depicting flowers, leaves and foliage) designs.

The blade itself measures 700 millimetres (28 in) in length from the guard. It tapers gradually from the guard, where it measures 52 millimetres (2.0 in) wide. The blade has a shallow fuller along its length and traces of pattern-welding are visible on its surface. The pommel is decorated with strips of silver and five matching strips are visible across the grip.

== Significance ==
The form and decoration of the Gilling sword places it within a group of late Anglo-Saxon swords classified as 'type L'; regarded as typical Anglo-Saxon swords of the Viking period and it has been compared to a similar example from Fiskerton, Lincolnshire. The sword may originally have derived from a grave, which had been disturbed by the mechanical excavator mentioned in the Coroner's report.

== Public display ==
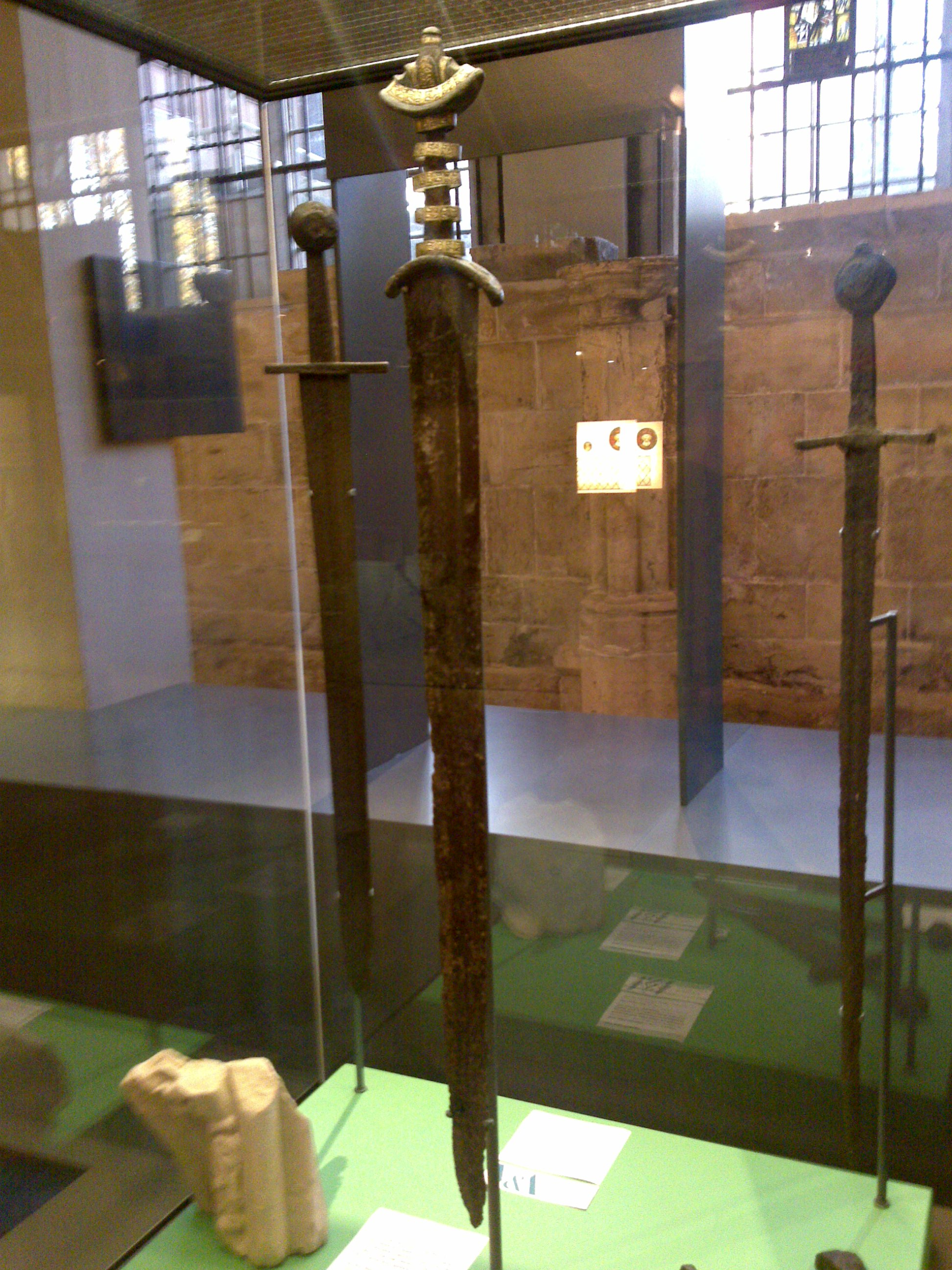
The Gilling sword on display in the Yorkshire Museum in 2010

The sword is in the collection of the Yorkshire Museum. It appeared in the exhibition "The Vikings in England", which was opened by the Prince of Wales on 30 March 1982 and was seen by over 235,000 visitors before it closed in October of the same year. This exhibition was awarded the European Museum of the Year Special Exhibition Award as a result of the presentation of the exhibition in the Museum and for additional educational projects organised by the curator Elizabeth Hartley.

When the Museum was closed in 2010 for a major refurbishment, the Gilling sword (along with the other key objects from the Museum) were displayed at the British Museum. It returned to the Yorkshire Museum for the new exhibition opening on 1 August 2010.

In 2013, it was included in the permanent medieval exhibition "Capital of the North".

In 2017, it formed part of a touring exhibition titled 'Viking: Rediscover the Legend' and is displayed alongside the Vale of York Hoard and the Cuerdale Hoard, with the tour starting at the Yorkshire Museum and subsequently including Atkinson Art Gallery and Library in Southport, Norwich Castle Museum, and the University of Nottingham.

The sword went back on display at the Yorkshire Museum in September 2019.

=== Assassin's Creed ===
The Gilling sword (titled the 'Bedale-Gilling Sword') appears as an unlockable reward in the computer game Assassin's Creed: Valhalla. It was released in an update in October 2021 called the 'Assassin's Creed Valhalla: Discovery Tour' - a nonviolent educational experience within the game. Maxime Durand, one of designers of the update for Ubisoft, said on Twitter that they worked with Sue Brunning (curator of Early Medieval Europe Collections at the British Museum and a specialist in early medieval swords) on the project.
