= Skeeby Beck =

River in North Yorkshire, England

Skeeby Beck: Gilling Beck; Dalton Beck
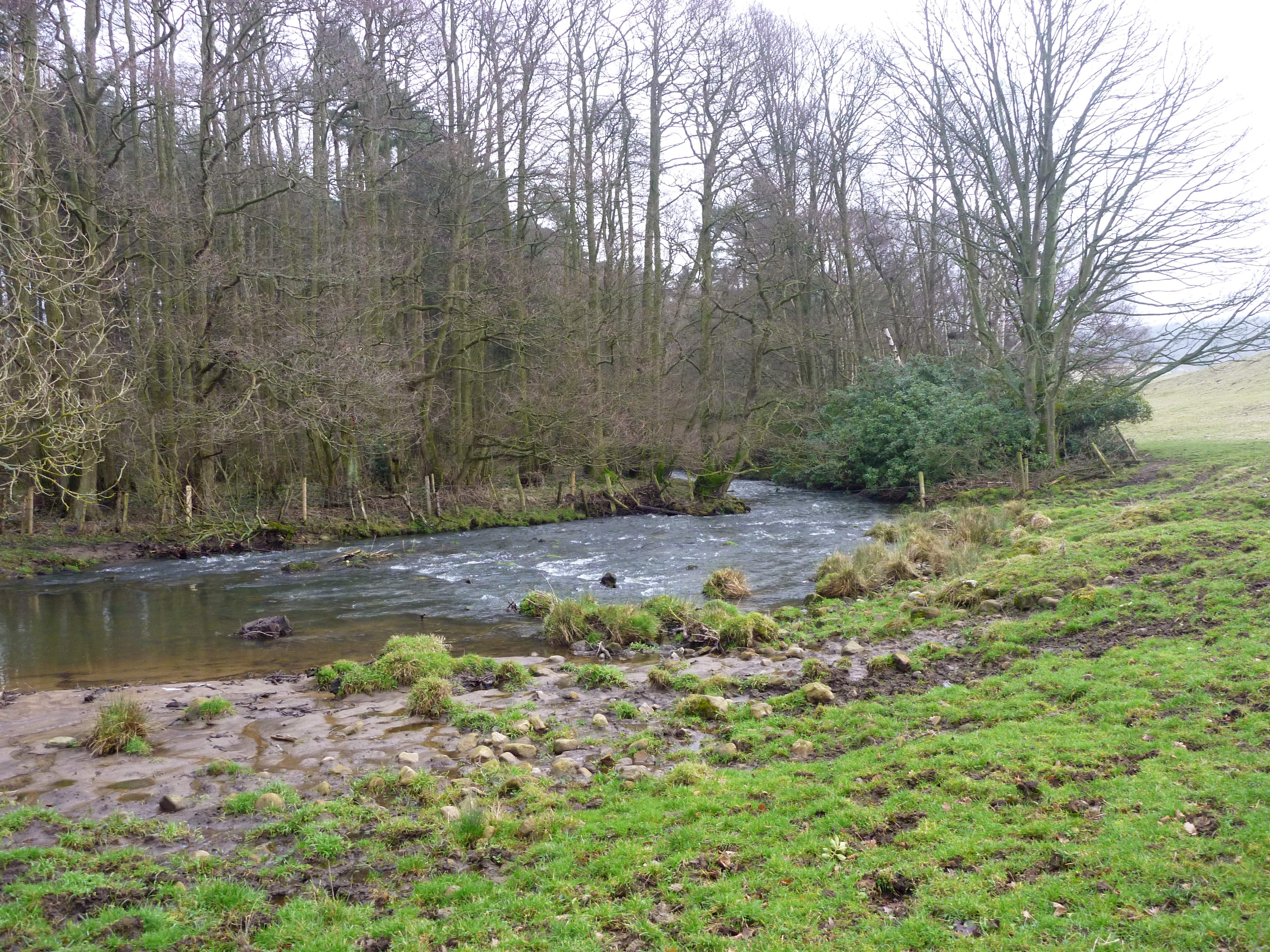
- Gilling Beck

- Location within North Yorkshire

Location
- Country: England
- County: North Yorkshire

Physical characteristics
- Source
  - location: Silver Hill
  - coordinates: 54.475°N 1.861°W
  - elevation: 284 metres (932 ft)
- Mouth: River Swale
  - location: Brompton-on-Swale
  - coordinates: 54.393°N 1.674°W
  - elevation: 71 metres (233 ft)
- Length: 45 kilometres (28 mi)
- Basin size: 80 square kilometres (31 sq mi)

Basin features
- River system: Humber
- EA waterbody ID: GB104027069180

Skeeby Beck is a small river flowing through Gilling West and Skeeby, near to Richmond, in North Yorkshire, England. Skeeby Beck drains the moorland to the north of Richmond and south of the A66 road, and flows in a south-easterly direction until it runs into the River Swale at Brompton-on-Swale. The Environment Agency designate the beck as a one river, even though it has four names along its length. Artificial modification of the beck to enable draining of surrounding fields has straightened the channel in its lower courses, and the bricking up of at least one arch on Gilling Bridge is thought exacerbate flooding when the area is subjected to high rainfall.

== Course ==
The main stem begins at Silver Hill, west of Newsham at an elevation of 284 metres (932 ft). The course the beck takes from its source down to the Swale was originally the main stem from the River Tees into the Swale before it was diverted towards the end of the Ice Age. The route of the original river (known as either the Proto-Swale or Proto-Tees) was through a hill which now reaches to 443 feet (135 m), and on its southern flank, is drained by Holme Beck.

In antiquity, the course of the beck between Gilling and the rivermouth at Brompton-on-Swale was the dividing line between Gilling West and Gilling East wapentakes.

Skeeby Bridge, a grade II listed structure which carries the A6108 road, straddles Skeeby Beck to the east of the village of Skeeby. The bridge has four unevenly-spaced arches, with the northernmost being almost sunk completely into the ground. In 1973, an armoured vehicle belonging to the British Army, crashed through a parapet in the bridge, and entered the beck. The vehicle could not be driven out, neither could it be craned back onto the bridge, but the local landowner refused access to the army to retrieve it. The army had to go to the High Court to effect an order for the recovery of the Saladin, which was at risk because of water damage and the danger of its secretive equipment "falling into the wrong hands". In 1976, a stone carved with an Anglian Cross and a hogback tombstone were discovered in the beck at Gilling, evidence of early Christianity in the area, being dated to the 9th century; all other sculptures found in the vicinity relate to a later Anglo-Scandinavian period.

The Environment Agency designate the beck as a river.

== Name ==
The beck flows for some 28 miles (45 km) draining the moorland above Richmond, and has many tributaries. It is assessed as one river by the Environment Agency, but its name changes in reflection of the area it is passing through, starting off as Dalton Beck, then Holme Beck, Gilling Beck, and finally, Skeeby Beck. Where it enters the Swale at Brompton-on-Swale, it was known historically as the Gilling and Skeeby Beck.

== Hydrology ==
The beck flooded in 2007, causing homes to be evacuated in Gilling West and Skeeby, and the closure of Skeeby Bridge on the A6108. The beck is designated as not being "heavily modified", and with a moderate rating in terms of its ecological status in 2019. It had been previously rated as good in 2015, however since then, the presence of a habitat for fish was included, and so it was downgraded due to agricultural runoff.

However, the Department for Transport have recognised that the entire network of becks and streams which make up Skeeby Beck have the potential to be affected by the future upgrade of the A66 road to dual carriageway between Stephen Bank and Carkin Moor.

Land to the east of Skeeby Bridge, where the river meanders, is known to be a floodplain. The beck further upstream has been modified to be straighter for agricultural purposes, and this has caused flooding around the bridge at Gilling West.

== Flora and fauna ==
Historically, the beck has been noted for the presence of native white-clawed crayfish (austropotamobius pallipes). Otters were noted on the beck in the 19th century, around the Skeeby Bridge area. The land was owned by the Earl of Zetland, who had the hunting rights for the animal. Whilst fish have been observed in the beck, a concrete ford between Gilling West and Skeeby is a barrier to fish passage. A bridge exists at the same location, so the ford has been cited as able to be removed, thereby improving migratory fish patterns.

== Pollution incident ==
In April 2023, a suspected slurry leak caused an extensive fish kill on the beck near Hutton Magna. The remaining fish species were at risk of not being able re-populate the river, and so in an effort to help this, one of the fords across the beck was removed completely and a bridge installed in its place. This allows fish to swim upriver, which was previously difficult to do because of the ford.

== Bridges ==
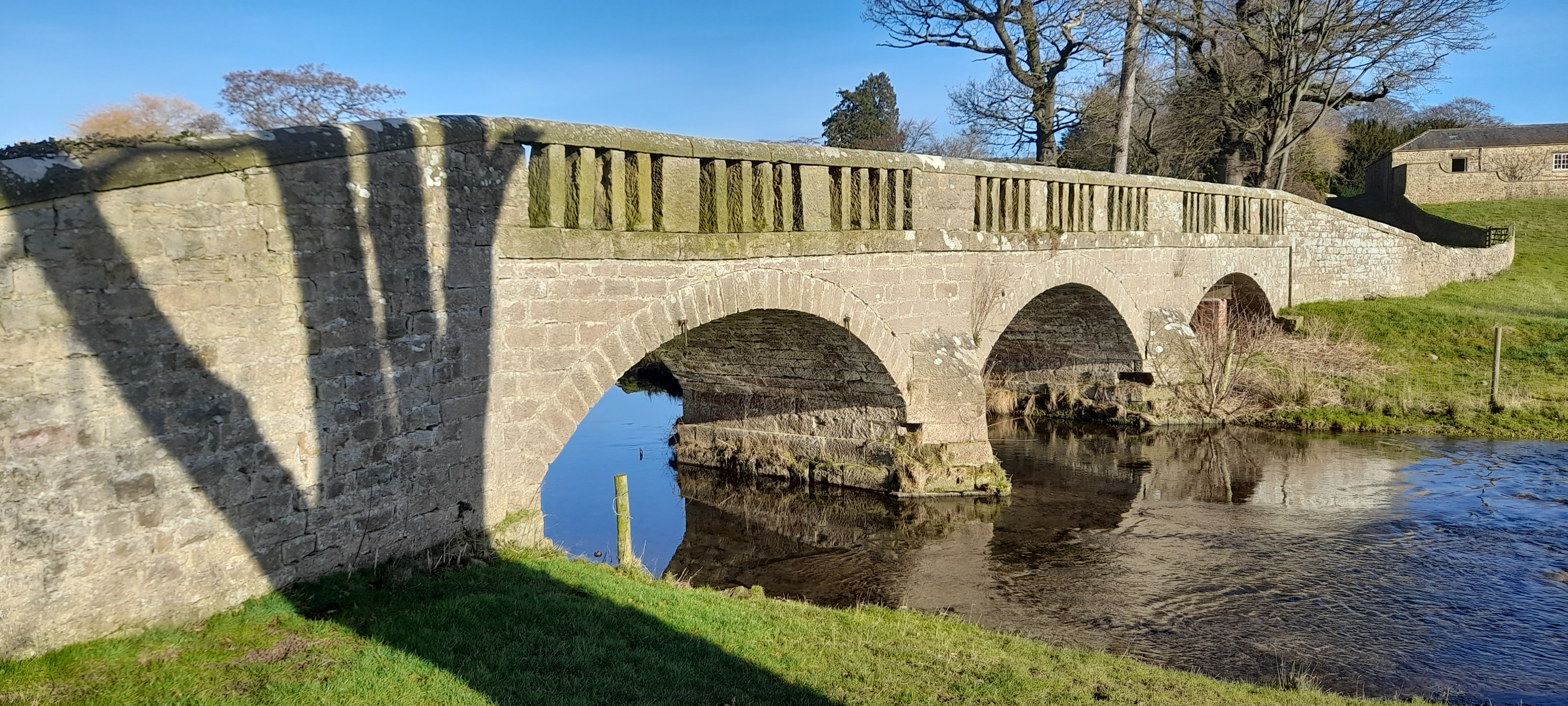
Hartforth Bridge over Hartforth Beck

Several structures over the watercourse are listed buildings. From north to south (all are grade II listed):

- Dalton Mill
- Footbridge over Holme Beck
- Holme Bridge
- Whashton Bridge
- Hartforth Bridge. This is the course of an old packhorse route.
- Gilling Bridge. This has three arches, but shows evidence of at least one more arch on the right bank, which seems to have been filled in. It has been suggested that the lack of egress for water during high rainfall periods, causes flooding in Gilling West itself. The bridge extends for 28 yards (26 m).
- Skeeby Bridge, carries the A6108 road
- Brompton Bridge, carries the B6271 road; a bridge has been recorded here since the 12th century.

== See also ==
- Gilling sword, a sword found in the river in 1976
