= Jonathan Raine =

English barrister, judge and politician

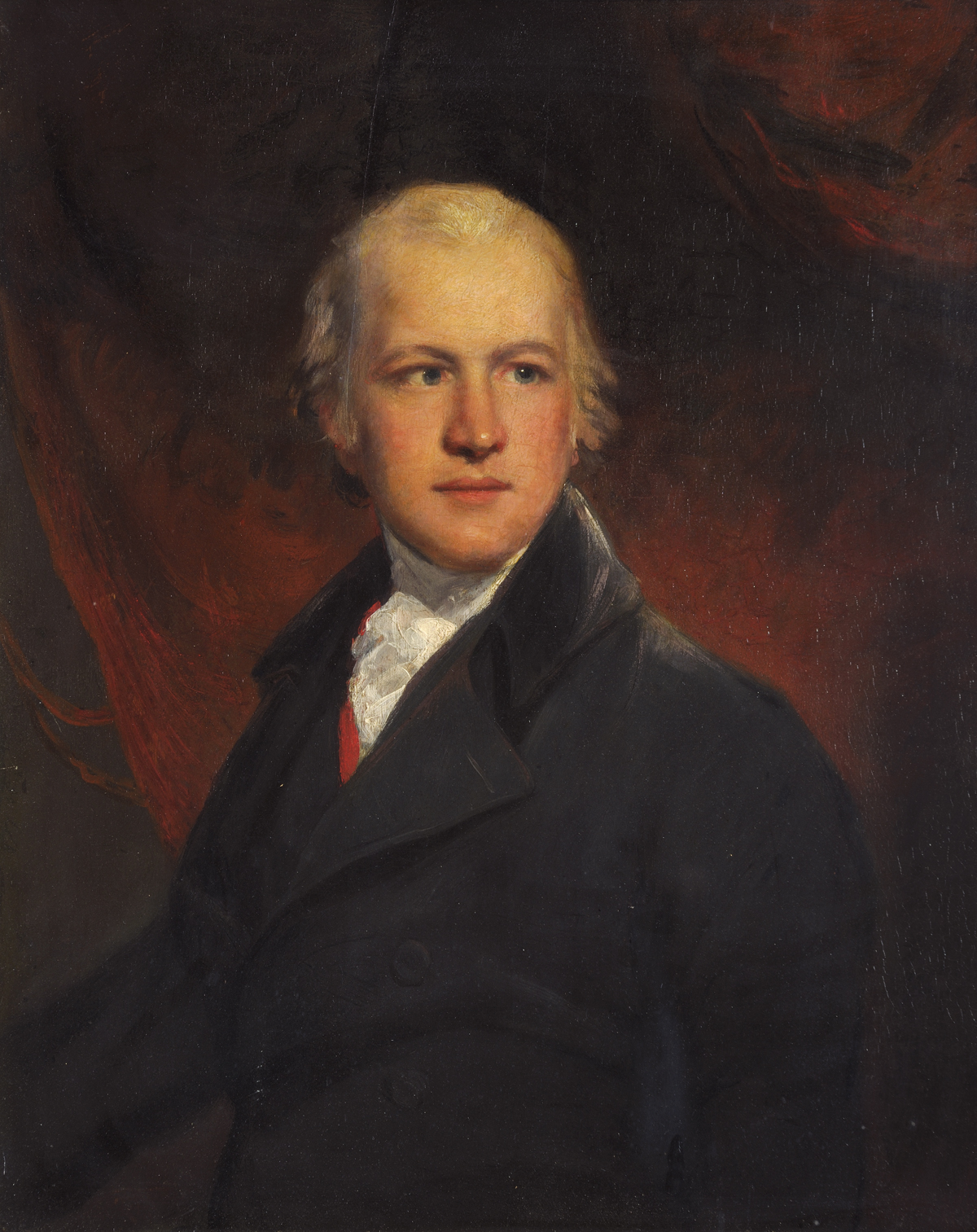
Portrait of Jonathan Raine by John Hoppner (1790)

Jonathan Raine (1763–1831) was an English barrister, judge and politician.

== Early life ==
He was the son of Matthew Raine, a cleric and schoolmaster, and younger brother of Matthew Raine FRS. He was educated at Eton College, where he was a friend of Richard Porson, and matriculated in 1783 at Trinity College, Cambridge, graduating B.A. in 1787, and M.A. in 1790; he became a Fellow of Trinity in 1789. Admitted to Lincoln's Inn in 1785, he was called to the bar in 1791.

From 1793 for a decade, Raine was a London criminal lawyer at the Old Bailey. He also became known as a special pleader, went the Northern Circuit, and gained a reputation for Latin verse.

== Associations ==
Raine was one of the circle of William Frend, being present on the occasion of the noted tea party with William Wordsworth on 27 February 1795. In 1800 Matthew and Jonathan Raine were executors for John Warner, the radical Whig cleric and scholar.

== Politician, lawyer and judge ==
Hugh Percy, 2nd Duke of Northumberland met Raine through his legal work on the Northumberland estate, and supported him as a parliamentary candidate for St Ives in 1802. At this point John Hammond, a Unitarian academic friend of Frend, hoped that Raine would prove a reformer of the "augean stable". He went on to be MP for Wareham 1806–7, for Launceston in 1812, and for Newport (Cornwall), 1812 to 1831.

In 1816 Raine became King's Counsel. In 1818 his seat at Newport, while "owned" by the 3rd Duke of Northumberland, was actually contested by candidates put up by Thomas John Phillipps, who also had property there. In 1823 he was appointed First Justice for the Counties of Anglesey, Carnarvon and Merioneth, a position abolished in 1830. As a Welsh judge, he stood down for Newport in order to contest the seat again: he was re-elected at the by-election, after Rowland Stephenson opposed him. He voted against the Great Reform Bill, which would abolish the Newport constituency.

== Family ==
Raine married Elizabeth Price on 24 June 1799 in Kensington.
