= Gilling West =

Village in North Yorkshire, England

Coordinates: 54°26′28″N 1°43′09″W

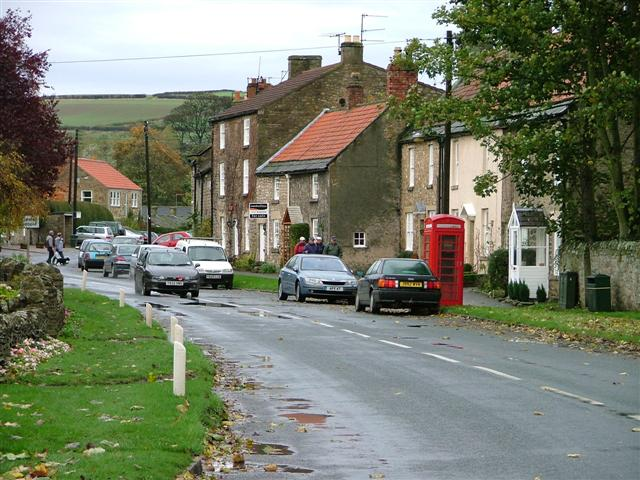
- Gilling West

- Location within North Yorkshire
- Population: 534 (2011 census)
- OS grid reference: NZ183050
- Unitary authority: North Yorkshire
- Ceremonial county: North Yorkshire
- Region: Yorkshire and the Humber
- Country: England
- Sovereign state: United Kingdom
- Post town: RICHMOND
- Postcode district: DL10
- Police: North Yorkshire
- Fire: North Yorkshire
- Ambulance: Yorkshire
- UK Parliament: Richmond and Northallerton

Gilling West is a village about 3.5 miles (5.6 km) north of Richmond in North Yorkshire, England. It is located in the civil parish of Gilling with Hartforth and Sedbury. It is named "West" to distinguish it from Gilling East near Helmsley, some 32 miles away.

A 2018 report states that the community houses people who commute to Darlington, Teesside and Richmond via the A66 and A1(M). The settlement "retains a village hall, two public houses and a shop but there is no longer a post office. There is a limited bus service to the village." The report adds that Gilling West is a Conservation Area with the High Street of particular significance. "A substantial percentage of the buildings [in the community] are listed as being of special architectural or historic interest".

== History ==
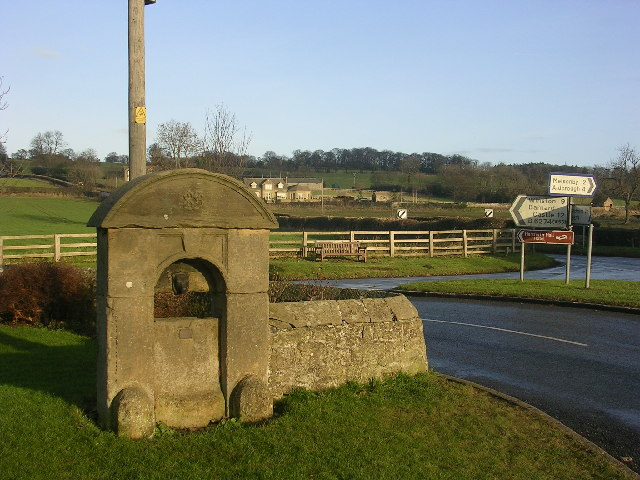
Remains of the village pinfold, used to hold stray animals, dating from around 1897

The name Gilling derives from the Old English Getlaingas meaning 'the people of Getla'.

Gilling was mentioned in the Domesday Book of 1086 under the name of Ghellinges "in the hundred of Land of Count Alan" as a tiny village with "16 villagers. 3 freemen. 6 smallholders". The tenant-in-chief was named Count Alan of Brittany.

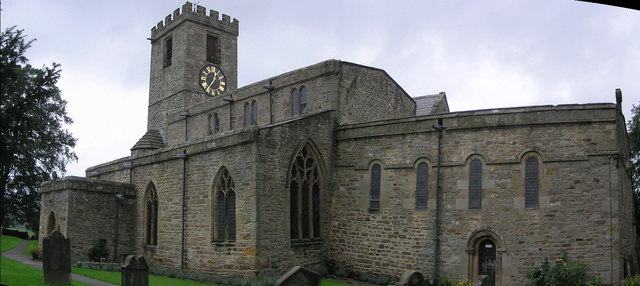
St Agatha's Church

The parish church is St Agatha's Church, Gilling West. The Domesday Book records a place of worship in the village as of 1086. The C of E website in early 2021 states "it is mentioned in the Domesday Book and parts of St Agatha’s date back to this period". It was subsequently restored and modified. The Historic Listing states: "Late C11, early C14, late C14, late C15, restoration and additions 1845". This is a Grade I listed property. The 2018 archeological report adds specifics about St Agatha's: "a number of pre-Conquest carved stones and a medieval grave cover" were discovered here. "The west tower probably belonged to the church at Gilling recorded in the Domesday Book as stylistically it belongs to the late 11th Century."

St Agatha's Church features a monument to Rear-Admiral Sir Christopher Cradock (1862-1914), who was born in the parish, at Hartforth.

In earlier times, the area was one of some importance in the Anglo-Saxon period of British history. In the 7th century it was a seat of the Deira in the southern region of the Anglian kingdom of Northumbria, and from the 9th century, the surrounding area known as Gillingshire was ruled by the Earls of Mercia, specifically Edwin, who was the last of the Earls to have a seat of power at Gilling before the Norman Conquest saw Edwin's lands given to William the Conqueror's kinsman, Alan Rufus. One report adds some specifics, indicating that this was an administrative area or 'wapentake'. In 1976, "a C9th Anglican cross ... a C10th hogback tombstone and a Viking sword" were discovered.

The sword was found by nine-year-old Garry Fridd in the beck while playing close to the bridge in Gilling. It turned out to be a double-edged, iron-bladed sword with a silver-decorated handle, dating from the 9th century. It is regarded as being amongst the best Anglian weapons ever to be discovered in England. The restored Gilling sword is in the collection of the Yorkshire Museum in York.

The area had a number of quarries that were used until the mid 1800s for stone used in construction. One survives, the Dunsa Bank Quarry.

The manor house Sedbury Hall, on the edge of the village, was described by one historical report as "the seat of the lords of Sedbury Manor" as of 1914. Formerly associated with the Darcy, Aske, Conyers and Nevil families, it is now home to the Baker Baker family (formerly of Elemore Hall, Pittington, Co. Durham). The present house was designed by John Carr, and its grounds were laid out in the 18th century by William Sawrey Gilpin.

Gilling Lodge, a Grade II listed building, was constructed in the mid 1800s for the Roper family, according to the listing. The archeological report about the area adds that Roper was part of a family of Richmond bankers. The house has since been "restored to National Trust guidelines" by owners who listed the property for sale in 2020. It was described as a 6,300 square foot home with "six bedrooms, five bathrooms and a cinema room".

== Governance ==
The village lies within the Richmond and Northallerton parliamentary constituency, which has been under the control of the Conservative Party for more than a century. The current Member of Parliament, since the 2015 general election, is Rishi Sunak, the constituency's previous incumbent being William Hague. Gilling West also lies within the Richmondshire North electoral division of North Yorkshire Council. From 1974 to 2023 it was part of the district of Richmondshire.

== Geography ==
Gilling West is located on the B6274 road that links nearby Richmond with the A66 trunk road and eventually continues on to Staindrop in County Durham. Nearby settlements to Gilling include Hartforth 1.1 miles (1.8 km) north-west, Whashton 2.6 miles (4.2 km) to the west, and the market town of Richmond 3.6 miles (5.8 km) to the south. Gilling Beck flows through the village. Further upstream the same watercourse is known as Hartforth Beck as it passes through the settlement of Hartforth, whilst downstream of Gilling West it becomes Skeeby Beck before its ultimate confluence with the River Swale just west of Brompton-on-Swale. The village is also prone to major flooding.

== Demography ==
For the parish of Gilling with Hartforth and Sedbury:

Population
Year	1881	1891	1901	1911	1921	1931	1951	1961	2001	2011
Total	872	754	736	714	721	739	669	665	555	534

In 2015, North Yorkshire County Council estimated the population of the parish to have fallen to 510.

== Community and culture ==
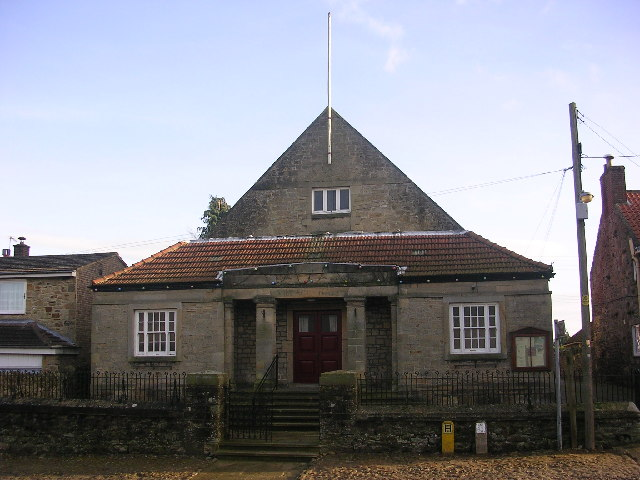
The Village Hall

Education for the children of the village is provided by three primary schools in nearby Richmond (CE, Methodist and St Mary's). There was formerly a village school known as Gilling School, built in 1847, but it has since closed and been redeveloped into housing. Pupils receive secondary education at Richmond School & Sixth Form College. The village has two pubs, the Angel Inn and the White Swan, and had a post office/village shop until its closure in 2013.

== Notable people ==
- Ralph Hedley, painter

== See also ==
- Listed buildings in Gilling with Hartforth and Sedbury
