= Sue Brunning =

British Archaeologist

Sue Brunning FSA

Academic background
- Education: University College London

Academic work
- Discipline: Archaeology
- Sub-discipline: Early Middle Ages; Medieval archaeology; Roman archaeology
- Institutions: University College London; British Museum; Portable Antiquities Scheme

Susan Elaine "Sue" Brunning FSA is an archaeologist specialising in Early Medieval material culture, particularly swords, and is the curator of Early Medieval Europe Collections at the British Museum.

== Career ==
Brunning completed her PhD in 2013 at University College London with a thesis titled 'The 'Living' Sword in Early Medieval Northern Europe: An Interdisciplinary Study'.

Brunning is the curator of Early Medieval Europe Collections at the British Museum and was involved in the 2014 exhibition of the Sutton Hoo collections. She advises on the importance and value of archaeological finds recorded via the Portable Antiquities Scheme, such as a silver sword-belt mount found in Culmington, Shropshire, declared as treasure in line with the Treasure Act 1996 in 2019.

She was elected a Fellow of the Society of Antiquaries of London on 11 November 2018.

== Select publications ==
- Brunning, S. 2015. "'(Swinger of) the Serpent of Wounds': Swords and Snakes in the Viking Mind", in Michael D.J. Bintley and Thomas J.T. Williams (eds) Representing Beasts in Early Medieval England and Scandinavia. Boydell.
- Brunning, S. 2016. "A 'DIVINATION STAFF' FROM VIKING‐AGE NORWAY: AT THE BRITISH MUSEUM", Acta Archaeologica 87(1), 193–200.doi:10.1111/j.1600-0390.2016.12171.x
- Brunning, S. 2019. The Sword in Early Medieval Northern Europe; Experience, Identity, Representation. Boydell & Brewer.
