= Skeeby Manor House =

Historic building in North Yorkshire, England

Coordinates: 54.4185°N 1.6927°W

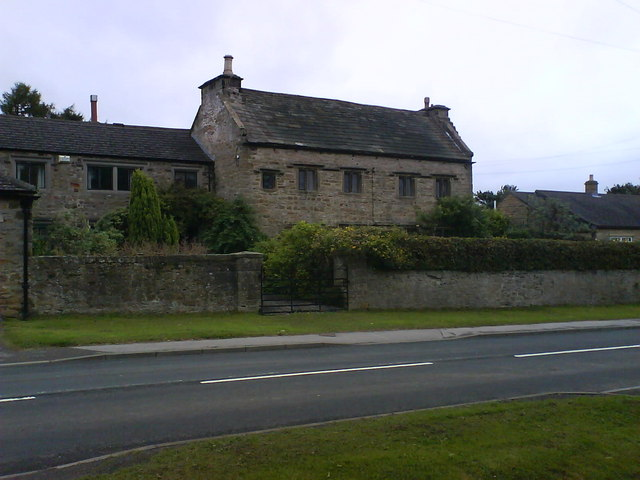
The building, in 2007

Skeeby Manor House is a historic building in North Yorkshire, in England.

The house was built in the early or mid 17th century. The Victoria County History describes it as "small but complete and typical". The building was grade II* listed in 1951. A local legend claims that a secret tunnel links it to Easby Abbey, which is about 2 miles away.

The house is built of stone, with quoins, and a stone slate roof with stone coped raised verges and kneelers. It has two storeys, a T-shaped plan, a front range of five bays, and a rear stair turret flanked by outshuts. In the centre is a doorway with a triangular head and a moulded quoined surround, flanked by two-light mullioned windows, all under a continuous hood mould. The upper floor contains a fire window in the left bay, and two-light mullioned windows with continuous hood moulds over each pair. To the left is a former barn incorporated into the house, and beyond that is a former coach house. Inside, all four original fireplaces survive, the one in the kitchen being 12 feet (3.7 m) long and 7 feet (2.1 m) high. One fireplace has a large surround includes seats each side. The turret staircase has some original treads.

== See also ==
- Grade II* listed buildings in North Yorkshire (district)
- Listed buildings in Skeeby
