= Gilling with Hartforth and Sedbury =

Civil parish in North Yorkshire, England

Coordinates: 54.447°N 1.678°W

Gilling with Hartforth and Sedbury is a civil parish in North Yorkshire, England. It includes the villages of Gilling West and Hartforth. The civil parish population at the 2011 census was 534.

== Governance ==
Gilling West remains the name of the electoral ward. This ward stretches north west to Ravensworth with a total population taken at the 2011 census of 1,184.

From 1974 to 2023 it was part of the district of Richmondshire, it is now administered by the unitary North Yorkshire Council.

== See also ==
- Listed buildings in Gilling with Hartforth and Sedbury
