= Hartforth =

Village in North Yorkshire, England

Coordinates: 54.45318°N 1.73355°W

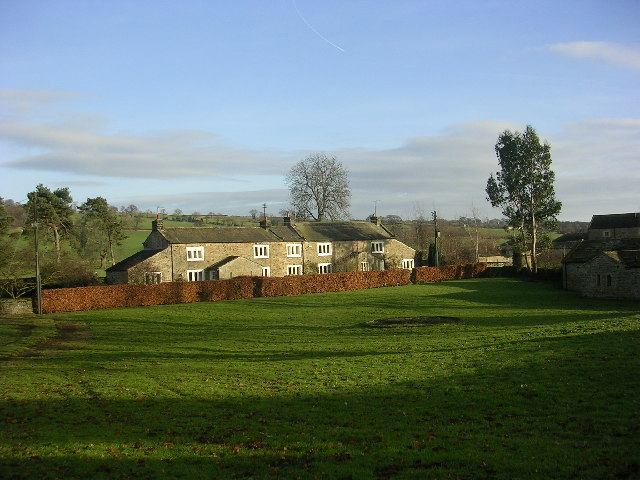
- Hartforth

- Location within North Yorkshire
- Population: 558 (2021)
- OS grid reference: NZ173064
  - London: 210 mi (340 km) SSE
- Civil parish: Gilling with Hartforth and Sedbury
- Unitary authority: North Yorkshire
- Ceremonial county: North Yorkshire
- Region: Yorkshire and the Humber
- Country: England
- Sovereign state: United Kingdom
- Post town: Richmond
- Postcode district: DL10
- Police: North Yorkshire
- Fire: North Yorkshire
- Ambulance: Yorkshire
- UK Parliament: Richmond and Northallerton

Hartforth is a small village in the county of North Yorkshire, England. The village is situated approximately 9 miles (14 km) south-west from the market town of Darlington, and is part of the civil parish of Gilling with Hartforth and Sedbury. The population was 558 at the 2021 census.

From 1974 to 2023 it was part of the district of Richmondshire, it is now administered by the unitary North Yorkshire Council.

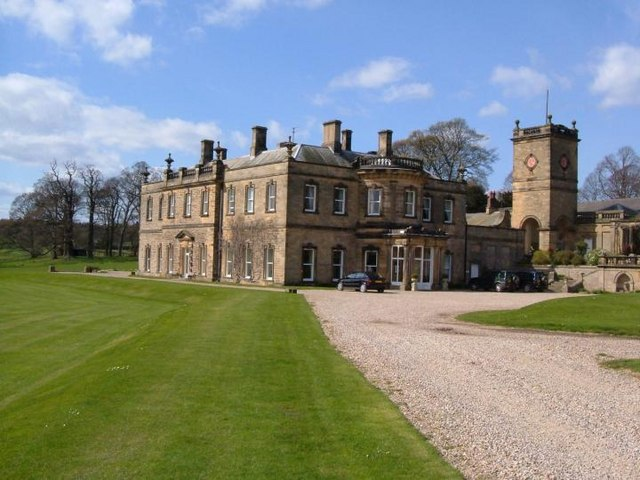
Hartforth Hall

Hartforth Hall is a Grade II* listed country house. It was built in 1744 for William Cradock of Gilling, who had bought the manor of Hartforth in 1720. Additions were made in 1792 and c. 1900.

== See also ==
- Listed buildings in Gilling with Hartforth and Sedbury
