= Brompton-on-Swale =

Village and civil parish in North Yorkshire, England

Coordinates: 54.3917°N 1.6619°W

- Brompton-on-Swale

- Location within North Yorkshire
- Population: 1,879 (2011 census)
- OS grid reference: SE219996
- Unitary authority: North Yorkshire
- Ceremonial county: North Yorkshire
- Region: Yorkshire and the Humber
- Country: England
- Sovereign state: United Kingdom
- Post town: RICHMOND
- Postcode district: DL10
- Dialling code: 01748
- Police: North Yorkshire
- Fire: North Yorkshire
- Ambulance: Yorkshire
- UK Parliament: Richmond and Northallerton

Brompton-on-Swale is a village and civil parish in the county of North Yorkshire, England. The village is three miles east of Richmond and 10 miles (16 km) north-west of the county town of Northallerton on the northern bank of the River Swale.

== History ==
The village is mentioned in Domesday Book as Brunton in lands owned by Count Alan of Brittany. The Count had granted the manor to the constable of Richmond Castle, Enisant Musard, after 1086, with the previous lord at the time of the Norman Conquest being a local man named Thor, who was listed as a sub-tenant. There were 16 households, 10 ploughlands, an 8-acre (3.2 ha) meadow and a mill. By the late 13th century the manor was in dispute between the Rollos family, who had been granted the manor seized by Henry II, and Roald of Richmond. After the death of William de Rollos, the Crown restored the manor to Roald. Some of the lands were held by Robert Lacelles and Peter Greathead and their descendants until sold to Richard le Scrope of Bolton in 1371. By 1380 the lands had been given to the Abbey of St Agatha at nearby Easby, which held them until the Dissolution. After that they were returned to the Scrope family. By the end of the 19th century the manorial rights had disappeared.

The name of the village is derived from the Old English words brōm, for the shrub Broom, and tūn, meaning village or farmstead. The suffix to indicate that the village is on the River Swale and distinguish it from the several other Bromptons in Yorkshire was added later.

The old Roman road of Dere Street ran between the modern A1(M) and the A6136.

Brompton-on-Swale was served by Catterick Bridge railway station until 1969; the station house can be seen just outside the village on the B6271 towards Richmond.

== Geography and government ==
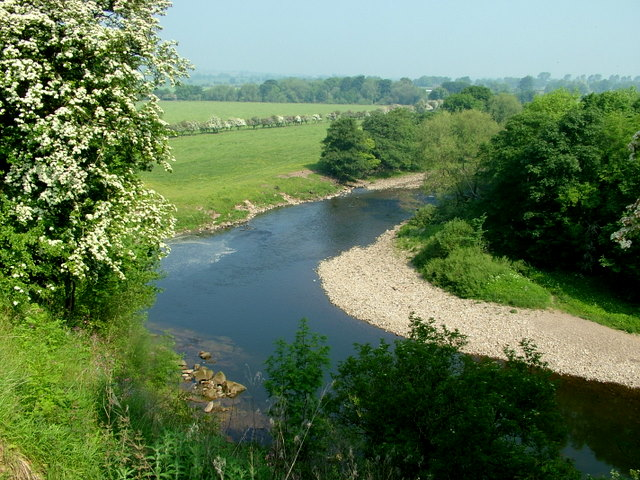
River Swale near Brompton-on-Swale

The village lies astride the A1(M) road. To the west of the A1(M) is mostly residentially and to the east are business and industrial units with some residential dwellings incorporating the former hamlet of Cittadilla. Two minor roads, the B6272 and the B6271, run east–west through the village. The old route of the A1, now labelled the A6055, runs north–south to the east of the new route. The villages of Scorton, Catterick, Colburn and Hipswell all lie within 2 miles (3.2 km) of Brompton-on-Swale.

The section of the A1 road that runs through the village was changed to a three-lane motorway as part of the A1 Leeming-to-Barton Improvement Scheme. The decision to proceed with the work was taken by the Chancellor of the Exchequer in December 2012. The work was completed in September 2017 after significant delays in the groundwork and archaeological surveys around the River Swale. The impact on the village was partial closures of the two bridges on Bridge Road and Station Road for widening work and the removal of direct access from the A6136 north of the village. Access to the north of the village is at the Scotch Corner junction using the old A1 northbound carriageway. Access to the south of the village is now via the improved Catterick Grade Separated junction.

The Parish Council has responsibility for the upkeep of the common land along the riverbank. There is a diverse range of trees including alder, ash, hawthorn, hazel, oak, sycamore, willow and wych elm. Surveys have also identified several varieties of flower common to the area that include bluebell, celandine, dogs mercury, ramsons, red campion, snowdrop, stitchwort, meadow cranesbill, violets and wood anemones.

The village is in the Richmond and Northallerton UK Parliament constituency. From 1974 to 2023 it was part of the district of Richmondshire and is now administered by the unitary North Yorkshire Council. The Parish Council has eight members elected on a four-year cycle.

== Demography ==
Population
Year	1881	1891	1901	1911	1921	1931	1951	1961	2001	2011
Total	360	435	361	351	362	489	542	559	1,719	1,879

=== 2001 Census ===
According to the 2001 UK Census, the parish was 48.4% male and 51.6% female of the total population of 1,719. The religious make-up was 81.9% Christian alongside a small minority of Buddhists and Hindus, with the rest stating no religion. The ethnic distribution was 98.8% White with rest being a small varied ethnic minority. There were 750 dwellings.

=== 2011 Census ===
According to the 2011 UK Census, the parish had a total population of 1,879 with 48.4% male and 51.6% female. The religious make-up was 73.3% Christian, a small Jewish, Buddhist, Hindu and Sikh minority with the rest stating no religion. The ethnic distribution was 98% White with a small varied Ethnic minority. There were 859 dwellings.

== Community ==
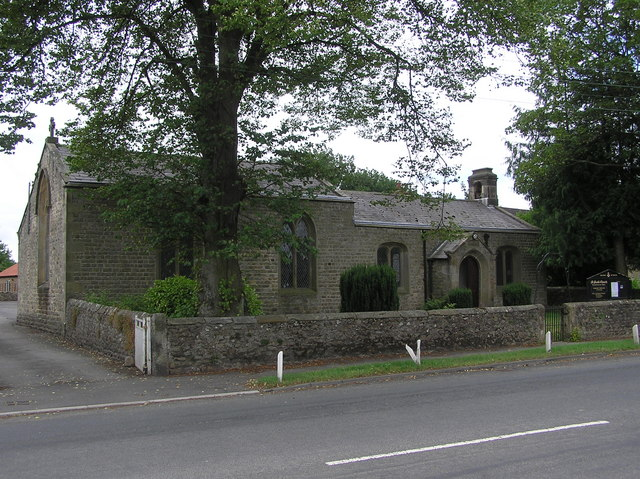
St. Paul's Chapel, Brompton on Swale

Brompton-on-Swale Church of England Primary School has around 140 pupils and was opened on the edge of the village in 1983. There are two public houses in Brompton-on-Swale, The Crown and The Farmer's Arms. There used to be a third public house on Station Road, the King William IV, which is a Grade II listed building. The village has a post office within the convenience store. There is a recreation ground with a community sports hall on the south side of the village, which is home to the cricket teams. The cricket teams play in the Darlington and District Cricket League.

== Religion ==
St Paul's Church, Brompton-on-Swale, was built in 1838 as a chapel of ease. It originally also served as a schoolroom. It is a Grade II listed building. The Methodist chapel was built in 1890 and refurbished in 2007. It is part of the North Yorkshire Dales Methodist Circuit and is a Grade II listed building.

== See also ==
- Listed buildings in Brompton-on-Swale
