= Ravensworth =

Village and civil parish in North Yorkshire, England

Coordinates: 54.46630°N 1.78403°W

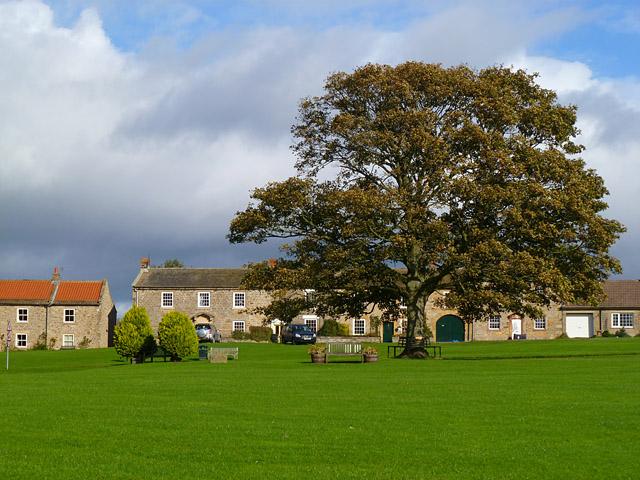
- Ravensworth village green with its ancient sycamore tree

- Location within North Yorkshire
- Population: 255 (2011 census)
- OS grid reference: NZ139079
  - London: 215 mi (346 km) SSE
- Civil parish: Ravensworth
- Unitary authority: North Yorkshire
- Ceremonial county: North Yorkshire
- Region: Yorkshire and the Humber
- Country: England
- Sovereign state: United Kingdom
- Post town: RICHMOND
- Postcode district: DL11
- Dialling code: 01325
- Police: North Yorkshire
- Fire: North Yorkshire
- Ambulance: Yorkshire
- UK Parliament: Richmond and Northallerton
- Website: https://www.ravensworthvillage.com/

Ravensworth is a village and civil parish in the Holmedale valley, in the county of North Yorkshire, England. It is approximately 4.5 miles (7.2 km) north-west of Richmond and 10 miles (16 km) from Darlington. The parish has a population of 255, according to the 2011 census.

Ravensworth was historically situated in the North Riding of Yorkshire, but has been a part of North Yorkshire since 1974 as a result of the Local Government Act 1972. From 1974 to 2023 it was part of the district of Richmondshire, it is now administered by the unitary North Yorkshire Council.

The village has ancient origins, dating back to the time of Viking settlements. In it are the remains of the 14th century, Grade I listed Ravensworth Castle, the ancestral home of the FitzHugh family. After the FitzHugh line came to an end, the castle was abandoned. Beginning in the mid-16th century, it began to be dismantled, but the gatehouse remains almost wholly intact. There are a number of listed buildings situated around the village green, mostly dating from the eighteenth century. Many of them were constructed using raw materials from the castle.

Today, Ravensworth is primarily a commuter village, and the historically important agricultural sector now employs only a small number of people. Historically, stone mining was important to the local economy. Although it died out in the twentieth century, a sandstone quarry was recently opened just outside the village.

Amenities include a primary school, a public house and a large village green.

Ravensworth is most frequently mentioned in the media as the home of the former international cricketer Ian Botham.

== History ==
=== Etymology ===
The name of the village derives from the given name of Hrafn, the founder of the settlement. Originally called Ravenswath, "wath" was the Old Norse word meaning "ford" and would suggest that the Holme Beck that passes through the village was forded in Viking times. Hrafn was a Norse word meaning "raven", so the village was literally the ford of Raven. Its name and spelling has varied over the years: in the 11th century it was Raveneswet, Rasueswaht in the 12th century, Raveneswade in 1201, Ravenswath from the 13th to 16th centuries, and afterwards beginning to settle on Ravensworth.

=== Early settlement ===
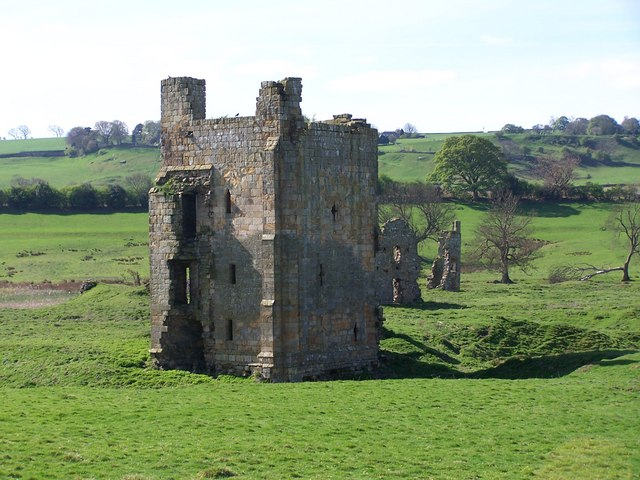
Ravensworth Castle

The earliest archaeological find in the Ravensworth area is a coin from the early Roman period. There has also been a number of finds from the Anglo Saxon era.

The Lord of the manor in 1066 was Thorfin, who also held the manor of Didderston. The Lord of the manor owned the surrounding demesnes, and the villagers were tenants of his land. The village is documented in the Domesday Book of 1086 as having 21 households, which was then quite large for a settlement. There was also a church and a priest. By this time, Alan Rufus had allocated the lands to his relative Bodin of Middleham. Bodin later relinquished his lands in order to become a monk, and the estate was passed to his brother, Bardolph, from whom the FitzHugh line is descended. Bardolph's son, Akarius Fitz Bardolph, donated lands for a monastery which were later to become Jervaulx Abbey.

A fortress was built during the reign of Henry II as the ancestral home of the Fitzhugh family, who purchased the land from the nuns of Marrick Priory. The fortress would have offered protection to the local population during Scottish raids from north of the border. King John was entertained there in 1201. The Fitzhughs were appointed barons on 15 May 1321. Ralph de Greystoke, 3rd Baron Greystoke, was born in the castle, home of his uncle Henry, Lord Fitzhugh, on 18 October 1353. Henry FitzHugh, 3rd Baron FitzHugh was appointed Lord Chamberlain of the Household by Henry V. Henry Fitzhugh built the now Grade I listed Ravensworth Castle in 1391 on the site of a previous fortress from the 11th century, and also received licence to enclose 200 acres of land around the castle to make a park. Robert FitzHugh became Bishop of London in 1431. After the end of the Fitzhugh male line in 1513, ownership of the castle and estate was passed through the female line to Sir Thomas Parr. Following his death, it passed to his son, a minor, William Parr, 1st Marquess of Northampton by which time it was ruined, largely as a result of being quarried for local building materials. It passed to the Crown Estate in 1571 after Parr died without issue. The castle began to be pulled down in the middle of the 16th century, shortly after the visitation by the antiquarian John Leland, however almost the entirety of the gatehouse remains intact. In 1629 the estate was conferred from the Crown to Edward Ditchfield. In 1633 it was sold to the Robinson family, who later sold it to Sir Thomas Wharton in 1676. It then passed to Wharton's son Hon Philip Wharton, before passing through his in-laws to Robert Byerley of Goldsborough Hall. By 1779 the estate belonged to the Legard Baronets.

=== Ancient parish ===
Ravensworth was historically the largest settlement in the ancient parish of Kirkby Ravensworth. The ancient parish encompassed an area of 15,000 acres, including Ravensworth itself, as well as the townships of Dalton, Gayles, Kirby Hill (or Kirby-on-the-Hill), New Forest, Newsham and Whashton. All of these places became separate civil parishes in 1866.

The parish church since 1397 has been the St Peter and St Felix's Church, situated in Kirby Hill, about one mile (1.6 km) from Ravensworth; it is believed to have been built on the site of a much earlier Saxon church. The cleric and historian John Dakyn was rector of the parish from 1554 until his death four years later. In 1556 he established the Kirby Ravensworth Free Grammar School (free from external control rather than free at the point of use) and an almshouse, and his benefaction continues to fund charitable causes for the parishioners.

=== Village history ===
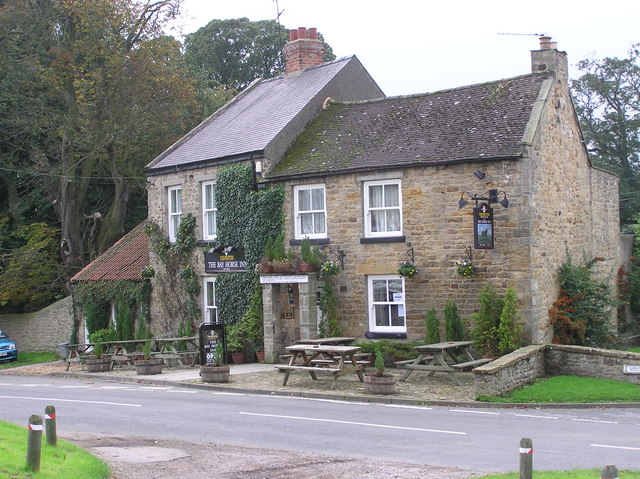
The Bay Horse Inn, which has been a public house in the village since at least 1857

The anchoress Margaret Kirkby was born in the village, possibly in 1322.

John Leland, and many others since, have described Ravensworth as a "pretty" village. There were a number of skirmishes in the area during the Civil War, and the region was a Royalist stronghold. As with many English villages, much of the housing stock consists of Grade II listed buildings, dating from the mid to late 17th century onwards. The poet Cuthbert Shaw was born in the village in 1738–9. The astronomer William Lax was born in the village in 1761, producing A Method of finding the latitude by means of two altitudes of the sun there in 1799. There were Inclosure Acts passed for the common fields in 1772–3 and 1776–7. In 1773, Samuel Hieronymus Grimm made several sketches around the village. The publisher Effingham Wilson was born in the village in 1785. In 1793, a gold penny dating from around 1257 during the reign of Henry III, was found in a field in Ravensworth; at the time it was one of only two known to exist, and as of 2011 only eight are known to exist.

=== Nineteenth century ===
Walter Scott referenced the village in "Rokeby" (1813), an epic poem set in the area. The artist J. M. W. Turner made several sketches of the castle on 13 July 1816. The Wesleyan chapel was built in 1822. From 1834, the parish was placed within the Poor Law Union of Richmond. A national school was built in 1841. The blacksmith's shop has been situated at the same site since 1841. In 1843 the parish was described as being almost entirely agricultural. The Bay Horse Inn public house dates as far back as at least 1857 (it claims a date of 1725), and its stone door case is 17th century or earlier, almost certainly built using material from the castle. In 1859 "good freestone" was being quarried in the village, although a short-lived copper mine had been discontinued; the father of Christopher Cradock was lord of the manor, and the village was described as "exceedingly neat". According to the 1881 and 1891 Censuses, agriculture and mining were the main industries. In the late nineteenth century, Speight noted the great longevity of many of the parishioners, owing to the space and pure air.

=== Twentieth century ===
The parish lost 23 men in the First World War and 5 in the Second World War. The roll of honour is held in the parish church. John Scott Bainbridge is additionally remembered in the First World War memorial at Barnard Castle School (then the North Eastern County School).

The Kirby Hill grammar school closed in 1957, having operated for almost 400 years. The school educated the Archbishop of Canterbury Matthew Hutton and the antiquarian James Raine as well as the aforementioned Shaw and Lax. In 1967 the new primary school building was opened. In 1974, the village became a component of North Yorkshire, having previously been situated in the North Riding of Yorkshire. The village's 15th century cruck house was dismantled in the late 1970s and reconstructed at the Richmondshire Museum. The land on which it stood was used to build the Mill Close housing estate in 1977. The former school premises became a village hall in 1987. The Post Office closed down in the mid-1990s. The Methodist chapel closed in 2019.

The former England cricketer Ian Botham has lived in the village since 1990, and in 2020 became Lord Botham of Ravensworth. His 17th century farmhouse situated on a 30-acre estate is his "most treasured possession" and Botham has commented that, "we like our Yorkshire home too much ever to leave it". Local and national media refer to him ironically as "The Squire of Ravensworth". His son Liam Botham has a house in the farmhouse grounds.

== Governance ==
Former Prime Minister Rishi Sunak, who represents the Richmond and Northallerton UK Parliamentary constituency, is the local MP. In the Anglican church it is within the deanery of Richmond, the archdeaconry of Richmond and the diocese of Ripon and Leeds.

== Geography ==
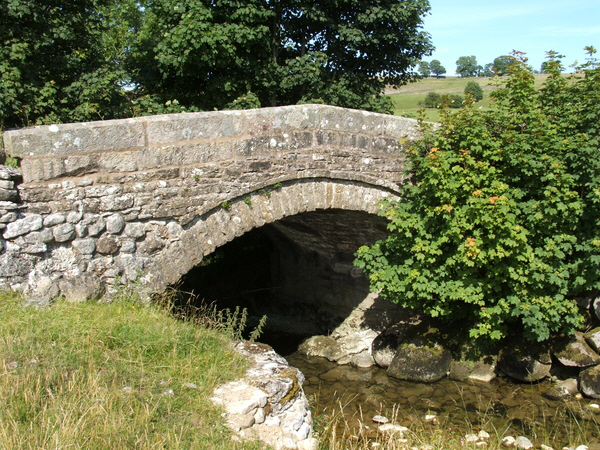
Holme Bridge, once the main bridge into the village, but since superseded

The village is situated 217 miles (349 km) from London. It is 16 miles (26 km) from the county town of Northallerton. The closest settlements are Kirby Hill, Dalton and Gayles. Other local villages are Newsham, East Layton, West Layton, Gilling West and Hartforth.

Ravensworth is 119 metres above sea level. The village is situated on a slight knoll to the south of the Holme Beck (sometimes known in the past as Ravensworth Beck or Gilling Beck), a minor tributary of the River Swale in an area known as the Holme valley or Holmedale. The valley was created by the Teesdale glacier during the last ice age. According to The Independent the village is "good walking country...surrounded by open countryside overlooked by hills and moorland." Holme Beck attracts kingfishers, dippers and grey herons. The marshland around the castle is home to moorhens, coots, Eurasian oystercatchers, Eurasian curlews and wintering duck such as teal and goldeneye. The ruins attract mallards, snipe and tawny owls.

The soil is loam and the subsoil is Yoredale Series. Most of the land around the village is arable farmland, although livestock such as horses are also reared, and sheep graze on the more rugged sides of the valley. Crops grown include wheat, barley and oil seed rape. The houses are generally built of sandstone and have distinctive "Yorkshire" roofs, a mix of soft red pantiles and slate. The village is described as "picturesque". The old Roman road of Dere Street formerly skirted the north-eastern outskirts of the parish and provides much of the northern boundary of the parish.

Usually the Pennines protect the North-East from rainfall, which tends to come from the west. Weather data is collected on a minute by minute basis by a Met Office weather station at Ravensworth Nurseries. On 2 December 2010, a temperature of -20.0 degrees Celsius was reported for Ravensworth by the Met Office; this was the first time -20.0 had been recorded in England since January 1987. In September 2012, Ravensworth made national news when MeteoGroup reported that the village had received the largest amount of rainfall in the country, 130.8 mm, (5.16 inches) between 1 am on the 23rd and 8 am on the 25th, which was thrice the average total for the month.

== Demography ==
Approximately 20 per cent of the villagers are of pensioner age, 20 per cent are under 18 and the remaining 60 per cent are of working age. The majority of villagers are commuters, with only around 20 people employed within the village itself, mostly in agriculture. Many people commute to the local market towns of Richmond, Barnard Castle, Northallerton and Darlington, but some travel further afield to the larger conurbations of Tyneside, Teesside and Leeds. Property prices in the ward are higher than the average for England. There were no recorded crimes in the village in 2009–2010; this is representative of almost every year. The average weekly household income for the ward is £600, higher than the Yorkshire and the Humber average. There are 10 people claiming Jobseeker's Allowance. The population is at the same level as it was in 1850; although the housing stock has expanded, the average number of residents per house has decreased.

== Amenities ==
Ravensworth contains a Church of England primary school which had 68 pupils in 2010 and a village hall. The village has a public house called The Bay Horse Inn, and a 5-acre caravan park. The "broad [and] pleasant" village green is substantial, at 17 acres, and most of the one hundred or so dwellings in the village are situated around it. The green hosts the stone base of a 15th-century cross or obelisk. The village quoits club is currently in abeyance. The area falls within the television reception area of ITV Tyne Tees. Newspaper coverage is provided by the Darlington-based Northern Echo, which has a North Yorkshire edition, and the Teesdale Mercury based in Barnard Castle. Water is supplied by Yorkshire Water. The water is the area is classified as hard, owing to the large amount of limestone in the area, and derives from a spring/borehole source. The village is within the boundaries of the annual fox hunting event, the Zetland Hunt.

== Transport ==
Ravensworth is situated near to the A66 and is 5 miles from the Scotch Corner junction on the A1(M) motorway. Its nearest railway station is Darlington railway station, 9.5 miles (15.3 km) away. Bus services which operate throughout the day connect the village to the nearby towns of Richmond and Barnard Castle. The village is situated close to the Yorkshire Dales national park, and is also only one hour from the North York Moors and the Lake District national parks. Newcastle and York are one hour's drive away, and Leeds is just over one hour away.

== See also ==
- Listed buildings in Ravensworth
