= The Grammar School, Kirby Hill =

Historic building in Kirby Hill, North Yorkshire, England

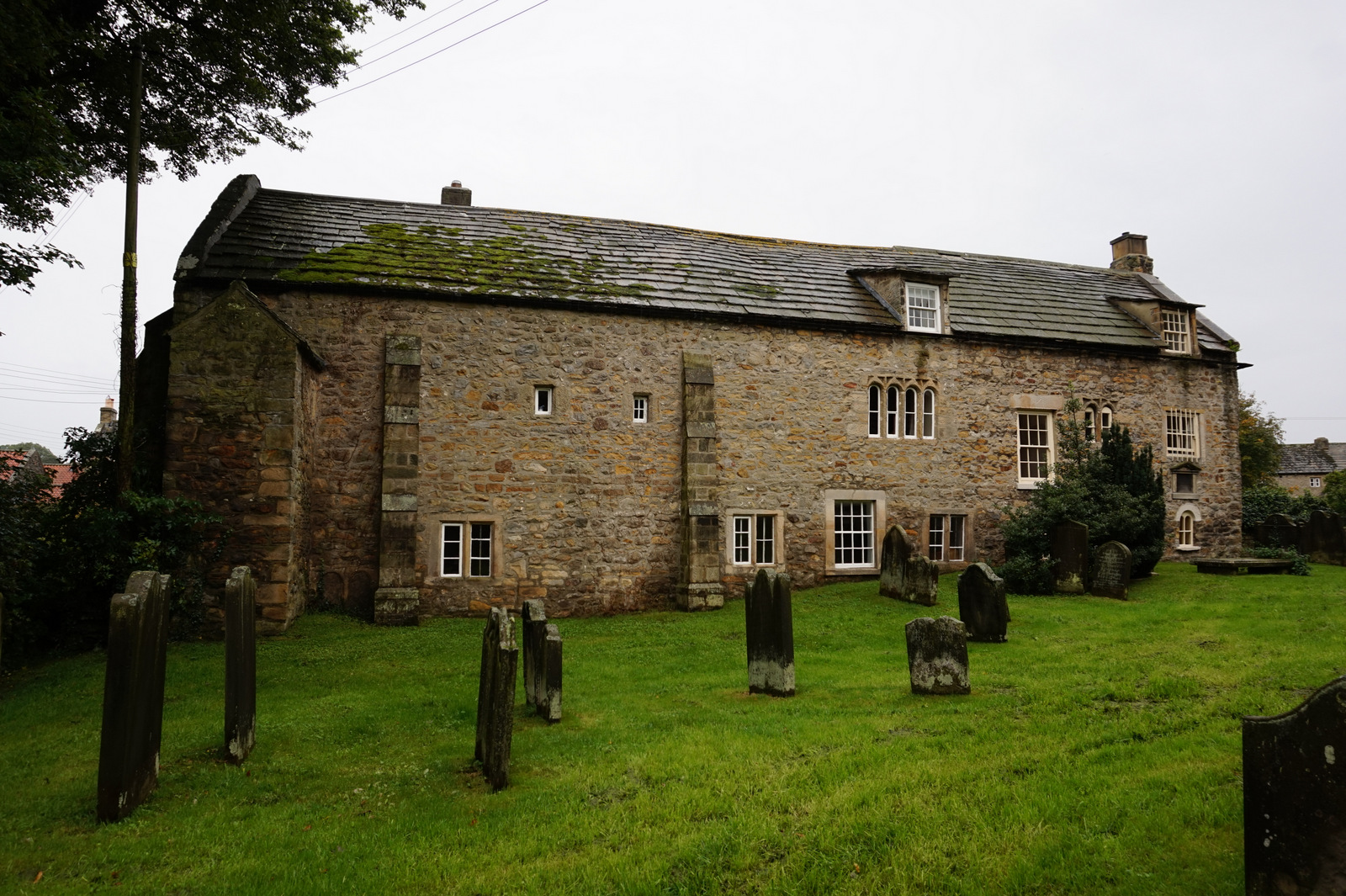
The building, in 2015

The Grammar School is a historic building in Kirby Hill, a village near Richmond, North Yorkshire, in England.

The building was commissioned by John Dakyn as a grammar school and hospital, and was completed in about 1556. The hospital was extended and converted into a house for the schoolmaster in 1706. In the 19th century a stable, wall and railings were added. The building was grade II* listed in 1951. The school closed in 1957, and the building was converted into a house and holiday flat. In 1973, the flat was leased for 50 years to the Landmark Trust.

The building is constructed of stone with stone slate roofs. The main range has two storeys, a partial attic and a partial basement, to the left is the two-bay master's house, and to the right is a three-bay former school. The main range overlooks the churchyard of Church of St Peter and St Felix, it has buttresses, and contains various windows, some mullioned, and dormers. In front is a low wall with canted coping and railings.

Dakyn founded a charity, the trustees of which are elected every other year in a ceremony, using materials stored in a cupboard which was built in 1784. A convenor writes the names of six suitable candidates on pieces of paper. Each is encased in a wax ball, and these are placed in a vessel containing water, from which three are drawn.

== See also ==
- Grade II* listed buildings in North Yorkshire (district)
- Listed buildings in Kirby Hill, Richmondshire
