= Gayles, North Yorkshire =

Village and civil parish in North Yorkshire, England

Coordinates: 54.46283°N 1.81079°W

Gayles
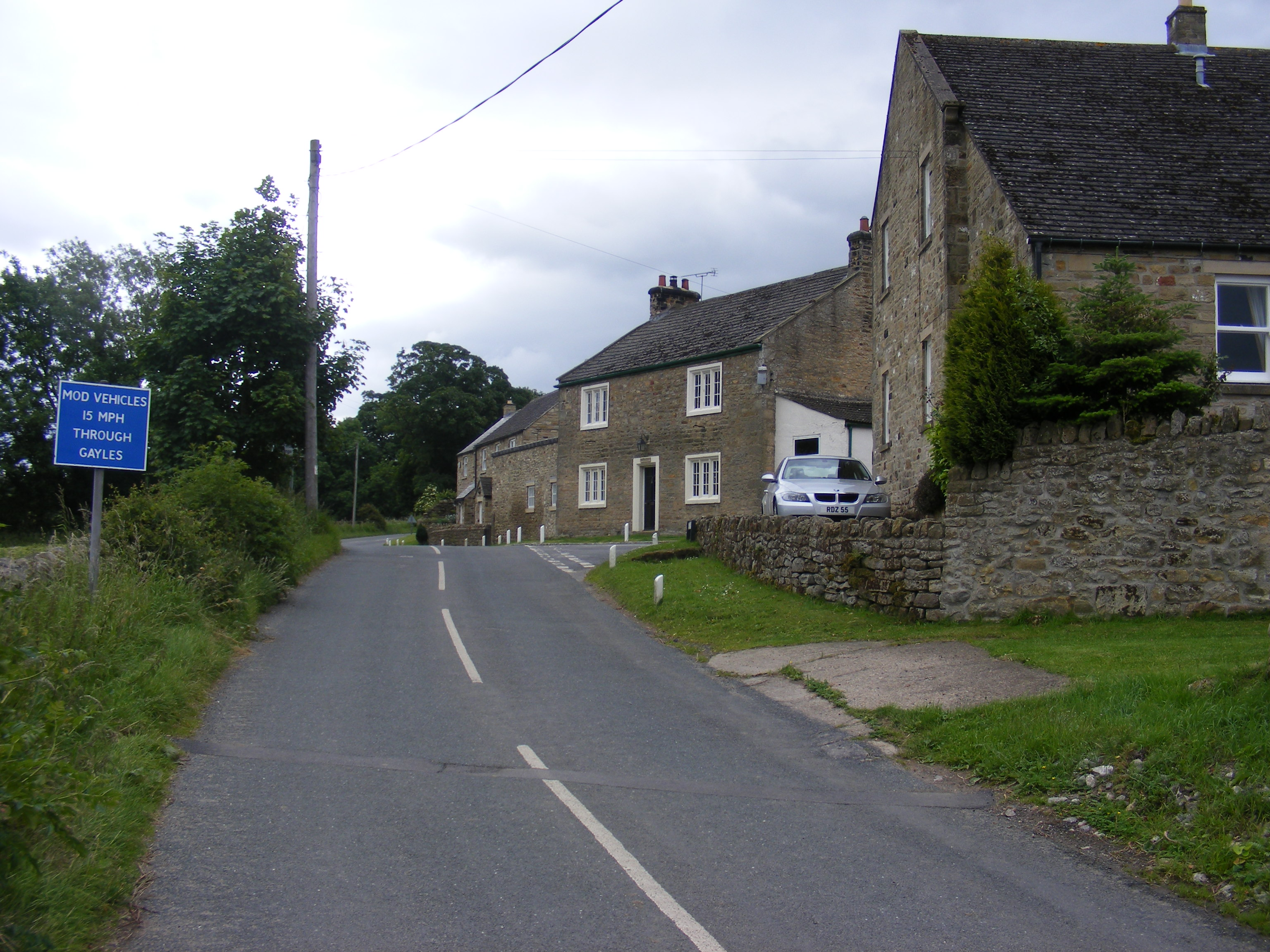
- Looking into Gayles from the west

- Location within North Yorkshire
- Population: 180
- OS grid reference: NZ123075
- Unitary authority: North Yorkshire
- Ceremonial county: North Yorkshire
- Region: Yorkshire and the Humber
- Country: England
- Sovereign state: United Kingdom
- Post town: Richmond
- Postcode district: DL11
- Police: North Yorkshire
- Fire: North Yorkshire
- Ambulance: Yorkshire

Gayles is a village and civil parish in the county of North Yorkshire, England. Gayles is established in the district ward of Gilling West. This small village consists of 80 households, with a total population (including Kirby Hill) of 180 according to the 2011 UK census. The area also includes two farms by the names of Gayles Hall Farm and Slip Farm. The village is roughly 10 miles (16 km) west of Darlington.

In 1870–72, John Marius Wilson's Imperial Gazetteer of England and Wales described Gayles as follows:

GAYLES, a township in Kirkby Ravensworth parish, N. R. Yorkshire; 5 miles NW by N of Richmond, North Yorkshire. Acres, 2,467. Real Property, £2,160. Pop., 197. Houses, 45.

== History ==
The name Gayles derives from the Old Norse geils meaning 'the narrow ravines'.

Gayles, Dalton, Kirkby-on-the-hill, New Forest, Newsham, Ravensworth and Whashton are the townships that compose the Kirkby Ravensworth Parish. Kirkby Ravensworth was historically situated in the North Riding of Yorkshire, and has been a part of North Yorkshire since 1974. From 1974 to 2023 it was part of the district of Richmondshire, it is now administered by the unitary North Yorkshire Council.

According to the UK census data, the population of Gayles has declined from 224 in 1811, to 180 in 2011. On 19 December 1951 the Gayles Hall (grid reference NZ1221207138) was registered as a grade II British listed building with the Richmondshire District Council having local authority. The Duchess Dowager of Northumberland is the most extensive owner, and also lady of the manor, but the Rev. John Shaw and Miss E. Hind have estates here, besides whom there are several small freeholders. The village is situated on the Barnard Castle and Richmond road, and is distant about eight miles from the former place, and five from the latter. Gayles Hall was long the seat of a branch of the Wycliffe family, but is now occupied by a farmer.

== Geography ==
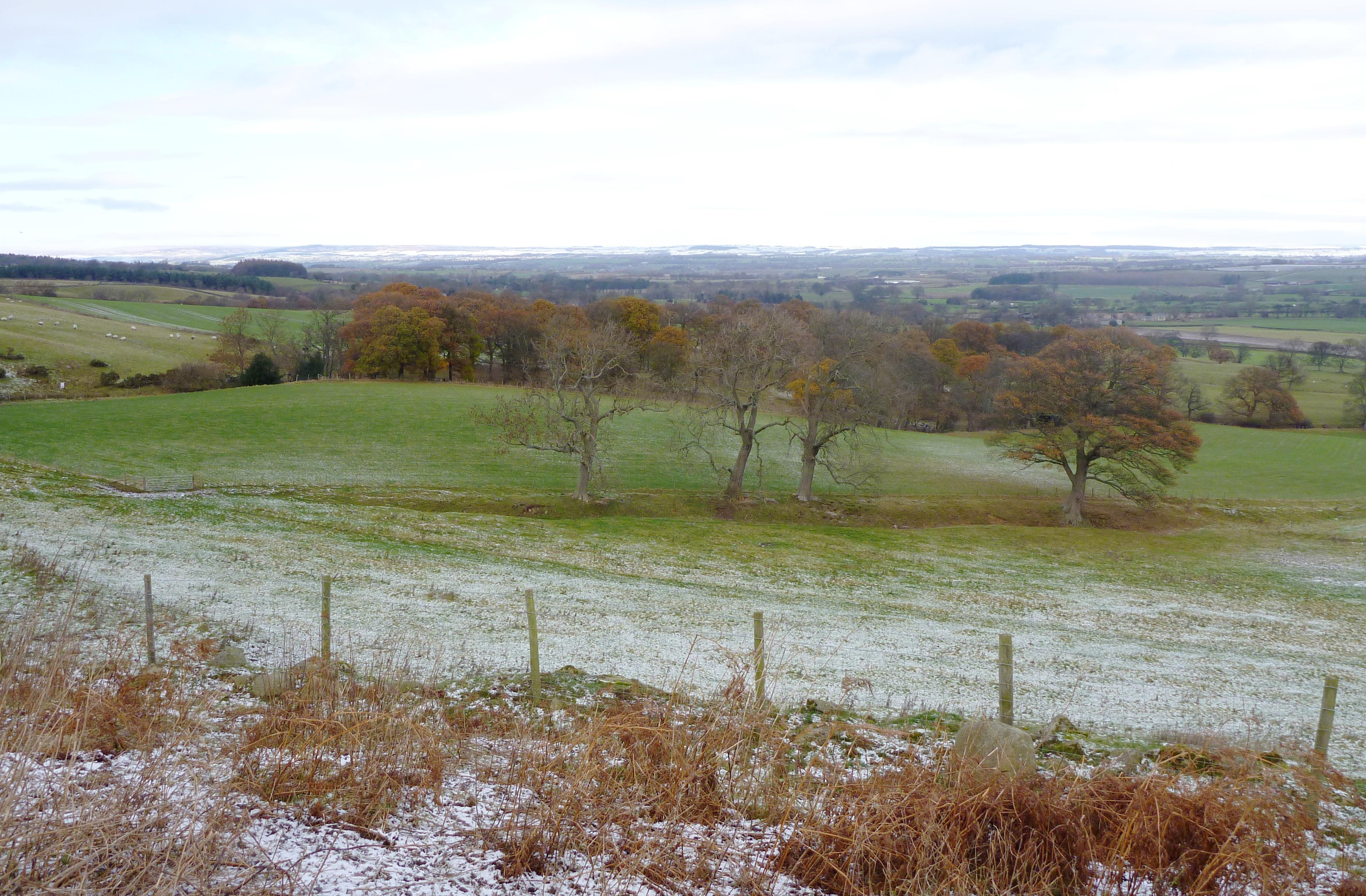
Swinery Wood from above Gayles

The village is 242 miles (389 km) from London and 21 miles (34 km) from the county town of Northallerton. The closest settlements are Kirby Hill, Dalton and Ravensworth. Other local villages are Newsham, East Layton, West Layton, Gilling West and Hartforth. Gayles is 505 feet (154 m) above sea level. Gayles is approximately 2 miles (3 km) south of the A66 major road which runs from east of Middlesbrough to Workington in Cumbria. Gayles has one minor road running straight through the centre of the village, the Slip Inn Bank. Gayles is situated 4.8 miles from Greta Bridge, 6 miles from Richmond, 8.7 miles from Scotch Corner and 8.4 miles from Barnard Castle.

Climate data for closest available data source to Gayles
| Month | Jan | Feb | Mar | Apr | May | Jun | Jul | Aug | Sep | Oct | Nov | Dec | Year |
|---|---|---|---|---|---|---|---|---|---|---|---|---|---|
| Mean daily maximum °C (°F) | 7 (45) | 8 (46) | 10 (50) | 11 (52) | 16 (61) | 18 (64) | 21 (70) | 21 (70) | 18 (64) | 14 (57) | 10 (50) | 7 (45) | 13 (56) |
| Mean daily minimum °C (°F) | 1 (34) | 0 (32) | 1 (34) | 3 (37) | 5 (41) | 7 (45) | 10 (50) | 10 (50) | 7 (45) | 4 (39) | 2 (36) | 0 (32) | 4 (40) |
| Average precipitation mm (inches) | 54 (2.1) | 44 (1.7) | 40 (1.6) | 45 (1.8) | 43 (1.7) | 64 (2.5) | 50 (2.0) | 65 (2.6) | 45 (1.8) | 64 (2.5) | 58 (2.3) | 59 (2.3) | 631 (24.9) |
| Average snowy days | 6 | 7 | 5 | 2 | 0 | 0 | 0 | 0 | 0 | 0 | 2 | 5 | 27 |

== Demographics ==
=== Population ===
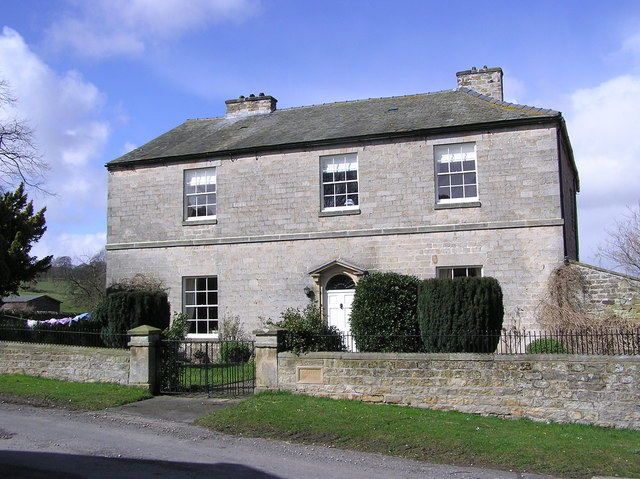
Gayles House, Gayles

The first recorded census of Gayles was registered in 1881 with a population of 125. This census continued to be carried out every ten years up to 1961 with statistics on total population, population change and a male to female ratio. There are no census records for 1941 owing to the Second World War. In 1931, Gayles population was at an all-time low of 90 people. There was no great change in the population from 1881 to 1961, with the largest range in population being 38. From 1961 the census data began gathering information from some places by wards and no longer by parishes.

The 2011 census data shows a population of 180, with a male to female ratio split 51 per cent to 49 per cent respectively. The census data shows that 52.2 per cent of Gayles' population are aged 30–59 years old and the mean age of the area is 43.4. Out of 180 people, 166 were born in England.

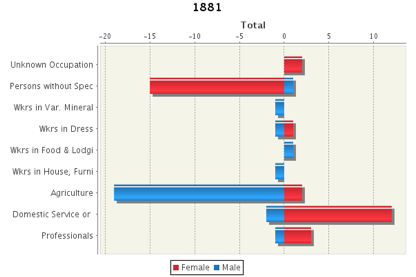
Occupations of Gayles

=== Occupation ===
The 1881 census data provides information into which employment category the population fall into. Sixty-two of the population of 110 were employed. The data shows that 19 of the 27 employed males worked in agriculture, while the other working males were spread out in categories including domestic services, catering and professionals in gentrification. In contrast, 12 females work in domestic services and 15 females work in occupations that cannot be specified.

According to the 2011 census 104 people out of 180 are employed, 53 of which are males and 51 females. Human, health and social work activities and agriculture are the two main industries in Gayles dominating 27.9 per cent of occupational share.

== Land use ==
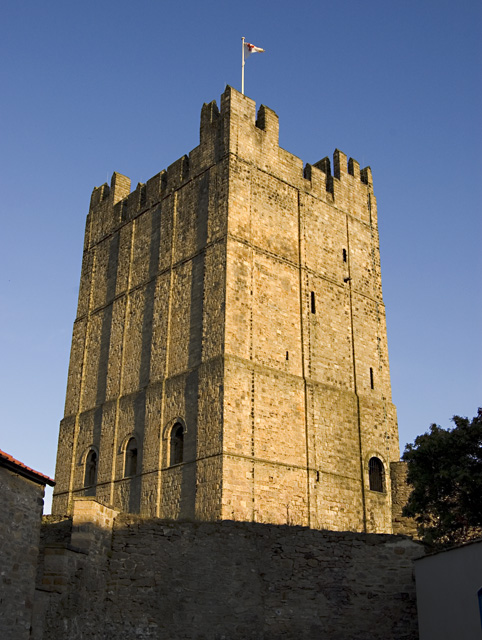
Richmond Castle, North Yorkshire

=== Housing ===
Gayles has been described as a hamlet or isolated settlement in an accessible inhabitant countryside. Housing in Gayles is typically detached and semi-detached, with an average asking house price £198, 143. Housing ownership is typically owner occupied and private rental. There is a total of 80 households in Gayles, 40 per cent of which are owned outright, with 79 per cent of the total households maintaining central heating. 13.8 per cent of the total population of Gayles are over 65 living in a one-person household. With 99 per cent of the population of Gayles 16 and over in these households speaking English or Welsh as their main language.

== See also ==
- Listed buildings in Gayles, North Yorkshire
