= Kirby Hill =

Kirby Hill is the name of several places in North Yorkshire, England:

- Kirby Hill, Harrogate
- Kirby Hill, Richmondshire
