= St Peter and St Felix's Church, Kirby Ravensworth =

Church in North Yorkshire, England

Coordinates: 54.4546°N 1.7851°W

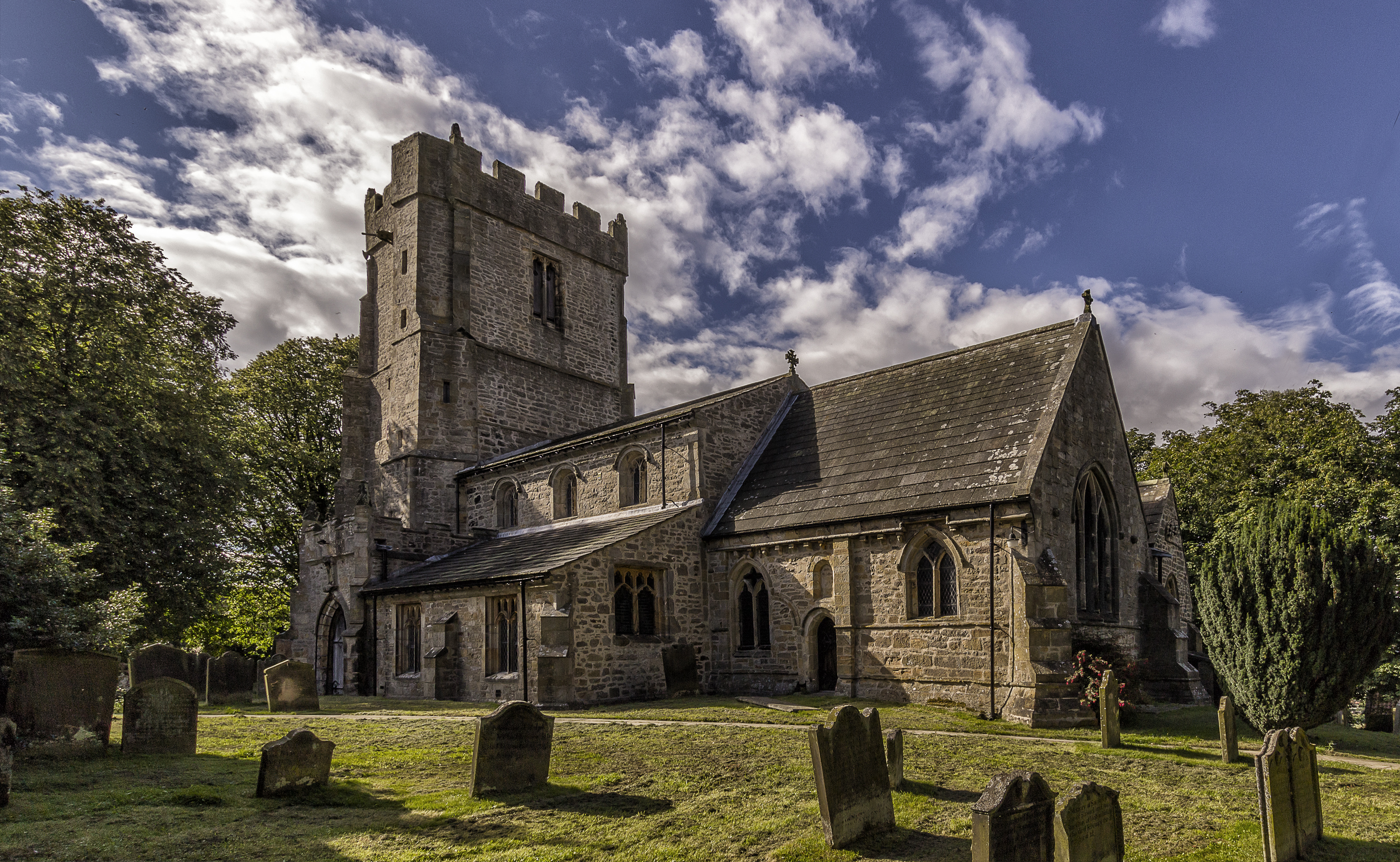
The church, in 2018

St Peter and St Felix's Church is an Anglican church in Kirby Hill, a village near Richmond, North Yorkshire, in England.

The first church on the site was Anglo-Saxon, while a replacement was probably built in the early 12th century. In about 1180, its chancel was rebuilt, and that is the earliest surviving section of the current building. In about 1300, a vestry was added to the north of the chancel, and the chancel arch was widened. In 1397, the tower and south porch were built, while in the late 15th century, the clerestory and south aisle of the nave were constructed. The church was restored in the 19th century, and was grade I listed in 1969.

The church is built of stone with stone slate roofs, and consists of a nave with a clerestory, north and south aisles, a south porch, a chancel with north vestries and a west tower. The tower has three stages, a chamfered plinth, a stepped diagonal buttress on the left with an inscription, the date, and at the top is a carved figure. On its right is a stair turret, in the bottom stage is a west window with a pointed arch, the middle stage contains clock faces, and the bell openings have two lights. Above them is a string course with gargoyles and shields, and an embattled parapet.

The tower has two bells. One is inscribed with the phrase Venite exultemus domino (Latin for "Let us come and praise the Lord", a quotation from Psalm 95), "SS 1664" (the year the bell was added), and the initials of the master founder, Samuel Smith of York.

A monument in the church commemorates a former rector, Dr John Dakyn (1497–1558), who was an archdeacon of East Riding. He took part in the Pilgrimage of Grace (and is a noted chronicler of it), but wrote that he "managed to exculpate himself".

Other notable rectors of the parish include George Fitzhugh (died 1505), who was a chancellor of Cambridge University and a dean of Lincoln; William Rokeby (died 1521), who was a lord chancellor of Ireland; and Alan Percy (circa 1480–1560), who was a master of St John's College, Cambridge. The church also has a monument to Thomas Wycliffe, who died in 1821; he was the last surviving male descendant of the religious reformer John Wycliffe.

== See also ==
- Grade I listed buildings in North Yorkshire (district)
- Listed buildings in Kirby Hill, Richmondshire

== Bibliography ==
- Lewis, Samuel, ed. (1931) [1848]. "Kirkby-Ravensworth". A Topographical Dictionary of England (Seventh ed.). London: Samuel Lewis. pp. 692–697.
- Page, William, ed. (1914). "Kirkby Ravensworth". A History of the County of York North Riding. Victoria County History. Vol. I. London: Constable & Co. pp. 87–97.
