= Newsham, Richmondshire =

Village and civil parish in North Yorkshire, England

Coordinates: 54.4856°N 1.8370°W

Newsham
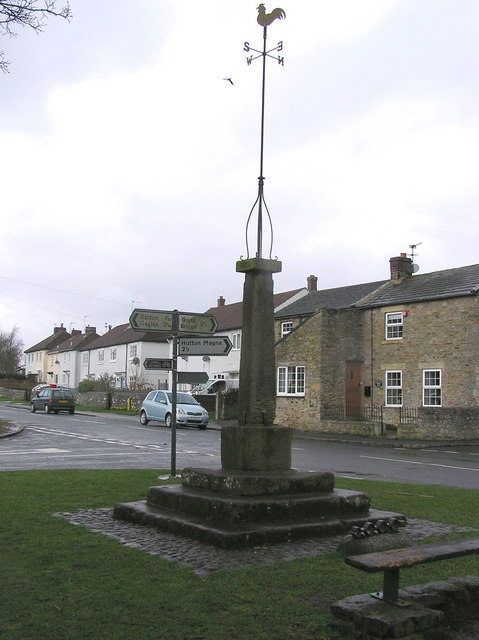
- Newsham

- Location within North Yorkshire
- Population: 306 (2011 census)
- OS grid reference: NZ149078
- Unitary authority: North Yorkshire
- Ceremonial county: North Yorkshire
- Region: Yorkshire and the Humber
- Country: England
- Sovereign state: United Kingdom
- Post town: RICHMOND
- Postcode district: DL11
- Dialling code: 01833
- Police: North Yorkshire
- Fire: North Yorkshire
- Ambulance: Yorkshire
- UK Parliament: Richmond and Northallerton

Newsham is a village and civil parish in the county of North Yorkshire, England. The village is 8 miles (13 km) north west of Richmond and 13 miles (21 km) south west of Darlington.

== History ==
The settlement of Newsham predates the Domesday Book, although the name of the village derives from the Old English nēowan hūsum, which means New Houses. At the time of the Norman Conquest, Newsham belonged to Sprot and Ulfkil. After the Domesday Book assessment, the land was in the hands of Count Alan and later passed to Minotts (of Carlton Miniott) in 1285 and then being seized by the Markenfield family by 1497.

During the Stuart and Tudor periods, the village was regarded as quite important due to its market, of which the grade II listed market cross still exists, having been erected in the 16th century. Another grade II listed building in the village is Newsham Hall, now a farmhouse, it once housed a boarding school in the early 19th century.

In 1870-72 John Marius Wilson's Imperial Gazetteer of England and Wales described Newsham as:

"a township and a sub-district in Richmond district, N. R. Yorkshire. The township lies 8 miles N W of Richmond, and is in Kirkby-Ravensworth and Barningham parishes. Acres, 3, 312. Real property, £3, 974. Pop. in 1851, 434; in 1861, 366. Houses, 84. Pop. of the Kirkby-Ravensworth portion, in 1851, 333; in 1861, 283. Houses, 61. Much of the surfaceis moor and woodland.—The sub-district contains also seven other townships. Acres, 16, 481. Pop., 1, 413. Houses, 313."

== Governance ==
Before becoming a separate parish, Newsham was part of the Kirkby Ravensworth, which also included Dalton, Gayles and Whashton. The village lies within the Richmond and Northallerton parliamentary constituency, which is under the control of the Conservative Party. The current Member of Parliament, since the 2015 general election, is Rishi Sunak. From 1974 to 2023 it was part of the district of Richmondshire, it is now administered by the unitary North Yorkshire Council.

== See also ==
- Listed buildings in Newsham, Richmondshire
