= Listed buildings in Gayles, North Yorkshire =

Gayles is a civil parish in the county of North Yorkshire, England. It contains 14 listed buildings that are recorded in the National Heritage List for England. All the listed buildings are designated at Grade II, the lowest of the three grades, which is applied to "buildings of national importance and special interest". The parish contains the village of Gayles and the surrounding countryside. The listed buildings consist of houses, cottages and associated structures, farmhouses and farm buildings.

== Buildings ==
Name and location	Photograph	Date	Notes
Gayles Hall and wall 54.45919°N 1.81319°W	—	16th century (probable)	A fortified house, later a farmhouse, in stone with quoins, and stone slate roofs with stone gable coping. There are two storeys and an irregular H-shaped plan, with a southeast front of three bays and flanking cross-wings. The doorway has an architrave], a frieze and a cornice. Most of the windows are sashes in architraves with keystones, some with parts of mullioned windows, and those in the wings with relieving arches and voussoirs. Attached to the house is a coped garden wall containing a basket-arched doorway with a chamfered and quoined surround.
West View; 54.46228°N 1.81146°W		1686	The house is in stone with a stone slate roof, two storeys and two bays. The central doorway has a chamfered quoined surround, and a lintel with a triangular soffit and a recessed panel inscribed with initials and the date. The windows are casements.
Manor House; 54.46079°N 1.81022°W	—	c. 1700	The house is in sandstone with an artificial stone slate roof. There are two storeys, and an L-shaped plan, with a main range of five bays, and an earlier lower protruding wing on the left. The main range has a plinth, rusticated quoins, a floor band, a moulded cornice, and a roof with shaped kneelers and stone coping. The doorway has a moulded architrave and a four-pane fanlight. The windows are sashes with architraves, keystones and moulded sills. At the rear is a blocked doorway with architrave jambs and chamfered banded rustication, and a lintel with a tripartite keystone and jewelled motifs. On the left return is a portico with unfluted Doric columns, and a Tuscan frieze.
Former Bay Horse Inn; 54.46271°N 1.81070°W		Late 17th or early 18th century	The former public house is in stone, with quoins, and an artificial stone slate roof with stone coping. There are two storeys and three bays. The central doorway has a chamfered surround, and the windows are double-chamfered and mullioned. At the rear is a doorway with a plain surround, and a double-chamfered cross window to the staircase.
Barn northwest of Gayles Hall; 54.45962°N 1.81413°W	—	Early 18th century	The barn is in stone, with quoins, and a stone slate roof with shaped kneelers and stone coping. There are two storeys, an L-shaped plan, five bays, a rear wing, and a hexagonal gin-gang to the right with a corrugated sheet roof. In the centre is a doorway with a chamfered quoined surround, a pitching door above, and slit vents.
Railings, walls, gateposts and gate piers, Manor House; 54.46090°N 1.81049°W	—	Early 18th century	The front garden is enclosed by a low stone wall with canted coping, and plain wrought iron railings. In the centre and flanking the gateway, are sandstone gate piers that are circular in plan and have ball finials. At the south end are the remaining lower courses of a larger gate pier.
Gayles House; 54.46276°N 1.81150°W		Late 18th century	The house is in stone, with quoins, a floor band, and a Westmorland slate roof hipped on the right. There are two storeys and a cellar, and an L-shaped plan, with a front range of three bays, and a rear kitchen wing. In the centre is a doorway with a fanlight and an open pediment on moulded brackets with paterae. The windows are sashes with lintels scored to resemble voussoirs. The left return is rendered and contains a round-arched landing window.
Pleasant View; 54.46218°N 1.81154°W		Late 18th century	Two cottages combined into a house, in stone, with quoins, and a stone slate roof with shaped kneelers and stone coping. There are two storeys and two bays. In the centre are two doorways, one blocked, and the windows are sashes with deep lintels.
Coach house northeast of Gayles Hall; 54.45973°N 1.81321°W	—	Late 18th or early 19th century	The coach house and stable block are in stone with stone slate roofs. The central coach house has two storeys and two bays, and a coped gable. It contains segmental-arched openings with quoined surrounds, and a single window above. It is flanked by single-storey three-bay stable ranges with quoins, a doorway with a chamfered quoined surround, and slatted windows.
Town Farmhouse; 54.46171°N 1.80961°W	—	Late 18th to early 19th century	A farmhouse in sandstone in two parts, with two storeys, each roof with shaped kneelers and stone coping. The main part has three bays, a Welsh slate roof, chamfered rusticated quoins, and a central doorway with a fanlight. To the left is a lower single-bay extension with a pantile roof and stone slates at the eaves. The windows in both parts are sashes, with one horizontally-sliding sash in the extension. At the junction of the two parts is a lean-to porch.
Hay barn northwest of Gayles House; 54.46306°N 1.81236°W	—	1817	The hay barn is in sandstone, with quoins, and a hipped stone slate roof. There are two storeys and three bays. On the front are three full-height arches joined by an impost band. The middle arch is segmental, and the outer arches have semicircular heads.
Belmont House; 54.46235°N 1.81139°W		Early 19th century	The house is in sandstone, with quoins, and a stone slate roof with stone coping. There are two storeys and two bays. The central doorway has a four-pane fanlight and a keystone, and the windows are sashes with deep lintels.
Garden wall and railings, Gayles House; 54.46266°N 1.81138°W		Early 19th century	The wall enclosing the front garden is in stone surmounted by wrought iron railings with spiked bars. It is swept down from the left, and forms a quadrant to the right. The wall contains a gateway flanked by square piers with imposts and pyramidal caps.
The Grange; 54.46011°N 1.80668°W		Early to mid 19th century	The house is in sandstone, with chamfered rusticated quoins, and a Welsh slate roof with stone coping. There are two storeys and three bays. The central doorway has a fanlight, and a frieze and a cornice on moulded brackets. The windows are sashes in raised surrounds.
