= St James' Church, Dalton =

Anglican church in Dalton, England

Coordinates: 54°28′15″N 1°49′28″W

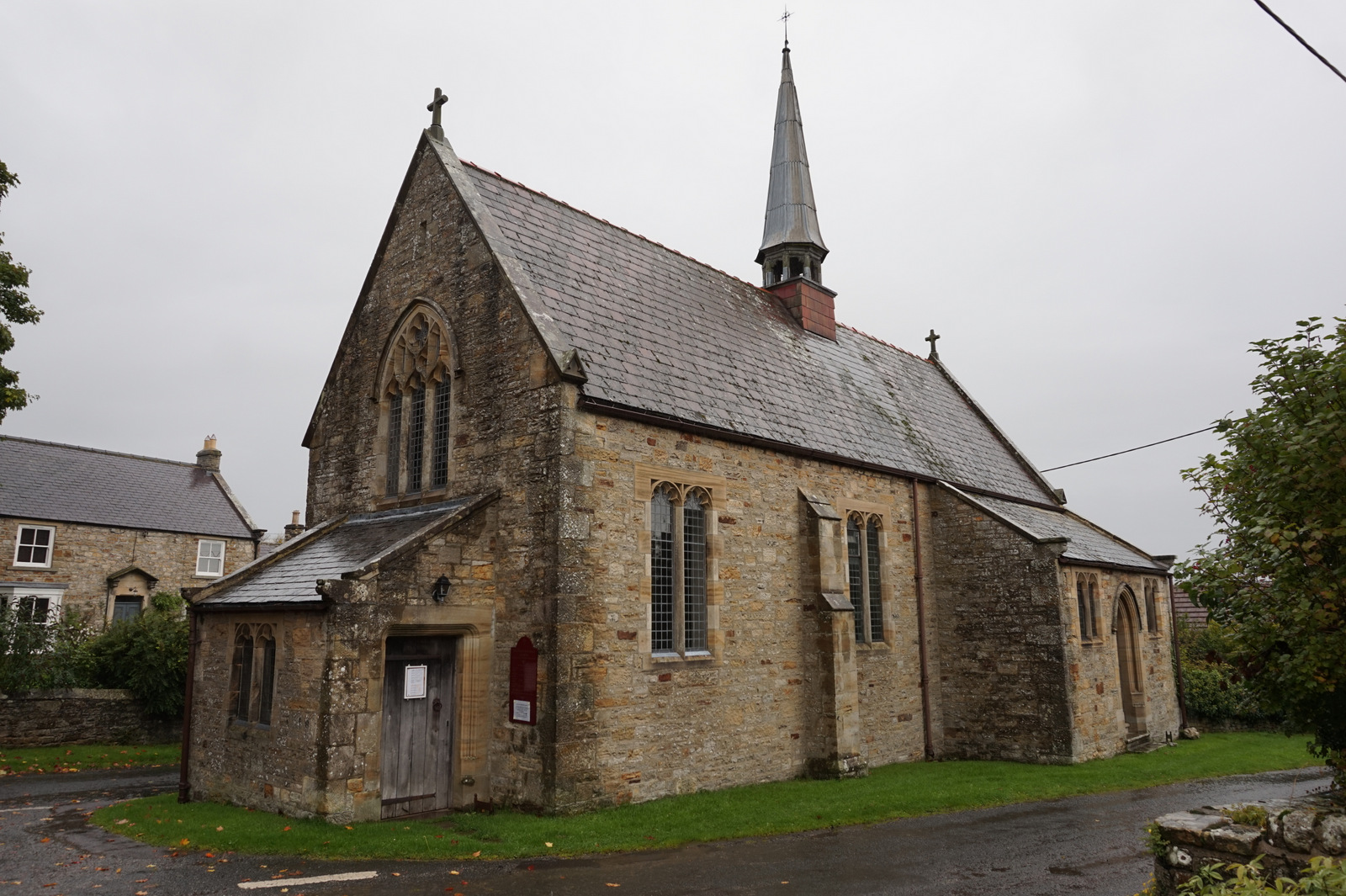
The church, in 2015

St James' Church is an Anglican church in Dalton, a village near Richmond, North Yorkshire, in England.

Dalton has lain in the parish of St Peter and St Felix's Church, Kirkby Ravensworth, since the Medieval period. A chapel of ease was first constructed in the village in 1846, at a cost of £298. By the 1890s, a larger building was needed, and one was designed by W. S. Hicke, capable of seating 120 worshippers. It was completed in 1899, at a total cost of £900. It is described by Norman Butcher as "a somewhat plain building".

The building is in the Decorated Gothic style, and is built of stone. It has a combined nave and chancel, and there is a bellcote above the east end, housing a single bell.
