= Listed buildings in Whashton =

Whashton is a civil parish in the county of North Yorkshire, England. It contains seven listed buildings that are recorded in the National Heritage List for England. All the listed buildings are designated at Grade II, the lowest of the three grades, which is applied to "buildings of national importance and special interest". The parish contains the village of Whashton and the surrounding countryside. The listed buildings consist of two houses and associated structures, two farmhouses, two bridges and a former smithy.

== Buildings ==
Name and location	Photograph	Date	Notes
Whashton Farmhouse; 54.45025°N 1.76746°W		Late 17th century	The farmhouse, which was extended in the 19th century, is in stone, it has Welsh slate roofs with stone coping, and there are two storeys. The older part, on the left, has three bays, it is rendered, and contains casement windows, a blocked fire window, and at the rear is a blocked mullioned window. The right part is taller and has two bays. It contains a sandstone doorcase with pilasters, an open pediment on moulded brackets, and a door with a radial fanlight. On the front are a casement window and blind matching windows, there are sash windows on the right return, and the roof is hipped on the right.
Whashton Lodge; 54.45099°N 1.76891°W	—	Early 18th century	The house is in sandstone, with quoins, and an artificial stone slate roof with shaped kneelers and stone coping. There are two storeys and five bays, an added bay to the right, a single-storey outbuilding to the left, and a rear outshut. The central doorway has an architrave and a fanlight, and the windows are sashes in stone surrounds. On the left gable is a blocked mullioned window. The left outbuilding contains casement windows and external steps on the left. The rear outshut contains a cart shed with a segmental arch.
Whashton Bridge; 54.45623°N 1.76150°W		18th century (probable)	The bridge carries Comfort Lane over Hartforth Beck. It is in stone and consists of a single segmental arch. The downstream side has voussoirs, and a parapet with segmental coping. On the upstream side, the arch is in dressed stone, and the coping consists of roughly dressed stones set on edge.
Old Smithy; 54.45093°N 1.77192°W	—	Late 18th century (probable)	The smithy, which was later extended and used for other purposes, is in stone with roofs of pantile and corrugated sheet. There is a single storey, and a T-shaped plan, with the older part on the right and the later part at right angles. The older part has a doorway and windows, and the later part has quoins, windows and doors.
Low Whashton Springs Farmhouse; 54.43991°N 1.77377°W	—	1797	The farmhouse is in sandstone with tile roofs. There are two storeys and six bays, and a rear range. The middle two bays project slightly, with a plinth, floor bands, a moulded cornice, and a coped parapet. In the centre is a doorway with an initialled and dated lintel, and it is flanked by semicircular two-storey bay windows with tripartite sashes. The outer ranges have quoins, the left with a round-arched window, and the right with a French window.
Bridge east of Low Whashton Springs Farmhouse; 54.43985°N 1.77315°W	—	Late 18th to early 19th century	The bridge, which crosses Springs Beck, is in stone, and consists of a single round arch of voussoirs with a recessed panel. The bridge has spandrels, a string course, a parapet with segmental coping, and a cobbled carriageway.
Garden walls, railings and gate, Whashton Lodge; 54.45077°N 1.76910°W	—	Early 19th century	The walls enclosing the front garden are in stone with segmental coping. The front walls are low and have wrought iron railings. The railings and gate have pointed bars, and the standards have urn finials.
