= Listed buildings in Dalton, west North Yorkshire =

Dalton is a civil parish in the county of North Yorkshire, England. It contains twelve listed buildings that are recorded in the National Heritage List for England. Of these, one is listed at Grade II*, the middle of the three grades, and the others are at Grade II, the lowest grade. The parish contains the village of Dalton and the surrounding countryside. Most of the listed buildings are houses, cottages and associated structures, and the others include a former corn watermill, a pigeoncote, a farmhouse and farm buildings.

== Key ==
| Grade | Criteria |
|---|---|
| II* | Particularly important buildings of more than special interest |
| II | Buildings of national importance and special interest |

== Buildings ==
| Name and location | Photograph | Date | Notes | Grade |
|---|---|---|---|---|
| Dalton Hall; 54.47641°N 1.83079°W | | 15th century | A fortified tower house with later flanking wings, in stone on a continuous plinth, with artificial stone slate roofs. The tower has three storeys and three bays, and a hipped roof. It contains quoins, a canted bay window on a bowed base, and sash windows on the front. At the rear is a French window with a double-chamfered surround, and a two-light double-chamfered mullion window with a hood mould. The left wing has two storeys and two bays, and contains a doorway with a fanlight containing radial glazing, and an open pediment on moulded brackets with paterae, and sash windows. The right wing has two storeys and one bay, and contains a doorway with a stone surround, and casement windows. | II* |
| Gate piers, Dalton Hall; 54.47784°N 1.83110°W | | Late 17th to early 18th century | The gate piers at the entrance to the drive are in sandstone, with a square plan. The piers have banded chamfered rustication and Ionic friezes. The capital of the western pier is dentilled below a moulded cornice, and has a complex plinth to a ball finial, and the capital of the eastern pier has a plain cornice, and a chamfered base to a ball finial. | II |
| Dalton Mill; 54.46892°N 1.82525°W | | Early 18th century (probable) | A corn watermill and miller's house, later a private house and outbuilding, in stone with quoins and roofs of pantile and stone slate. The mill has three storeys, the house at right angles has two storeys, and in the angle is an extension. The windows in the house are ashes, some of them horizontally-sliding. Inside the house is an inglenook fireplace. | II |
| The Cottages; 54.47114°N 1.82325°W | — | Early to mid 18th century | A pair of cottages in sandstone, with chamfered rusticated quoins, and a Welsh slate roof with stone slate at the eaves, shaped kneelers and stone coping. There is a single storey and five bays, and a lean-to porch on the left. The main doorway has an architrave, a pulvinated frieze and a pediment. There is a simpler doorway in the porch, and the windows are sashes with tripartite keystones. | II |
| The Nook, Corner Cottage and outbuildings 54.47203°N 1.82382°W | — | Early to mid 18th century | Two cottages in stone, with reversed stepped gables, and two storeys. The Nook, on the left, has a pantile roof with stone slate at the eaves, quoins, a doorway with a quoined surround, and casement windows. To the left is a lower outbuilding containing a doorway. Corner Cottage dates from the mid to late 18th century, and has a Welsh slate roof with stone slate at the eaves, and contains a sash window and two casement windows. The outbuilding to the right has a pantile roof, quoins, a doorway and a shuttered opening in the upper floor. | II |
| Moor View; 54.47134°N 1.82372°W | — | Mid 18th century | The house is in stone, and has a pantile roof with stone coping and shaped kneelers. There are two storeys and three bays. In the centre is a lean-to porch containing a casement window, above it is another casement window, and the rest of the windows are sashes. | II |
| Pigeoncote; 54.47767°N 1.79215°W | — | Mid to late 18th century | The building is in sandstone with quoins. It has two storeys and one bay, and consists of privies in the ground floor and a pigeoncote above. In the ground floor is a doorway with impost blocks, and above is a semicircular opening and pigeon holes. | II |
| Farm buildings north of Dalton Hall; 54.47678°N 1.83109°W | — | Late 18th to early 19th century | The range of attached farm buildings are in stone, with roofs of pantile and stone slate, and are in one and two storeys. The buildings consist of barns, a cow house, and a stable with a loft. | II |
| Dalton House; 54.47041°N 1.82700°W | | Late 18th to early 19th century | A stone house on a part plinth, with quoins and stone slate roofs. There are two storeys and four bays. The central doorway has a fanlight and a triangular slab hood, and above it is a carved panel including initials and a date. The windows are sashes with projecting sills and deep lintels. | II |
| Holmedale; 54.47076°N 1.82410°W | — | 1812 | A house and attached cottage in stone, with quoins, and a stone slate roof with stone coping, and two storeys. The house has two bays, a plinth, an eaves band, and it contains a doorway with an open pediment on moulded brackets. Above it is a circular plaque with initials and the date, and the windows are sashes. The cottage to the right has one bay, a doorway with a quoined surround and horizontally-sliding sash windows. | II |
| Dalton Fields; 54.48060°N 1.82727°W | | c. 1840 | A farmhouse in sandstone on a chamfered plinth, with chamfered rusticated quoins, and a hipped Westmorland slate roof. There are two storeys and three bays. In the centre is a doorway with Roman Doric half-columns, a fanlight, a frieze and a cornice. The windows are sashes, those in the ground floor tripartite and divided by Doric column shafts with rings. At the rear are round-arched landing windows with cornice capitals. | II |
| Dunsa Manor; 54.48024°N 1.79809°W | | 1842 | The house, designed by Ignatius Bonomi, is in sandstone, with chamfered rusticated quoins and a hipped Welsh slate roof with oversailing eaves. There are two storeys, three bays, and a recessed single-bay service wing on the left. The doorway is in the centre, the windows in the main block are sashes, and all the openings have rusticated quoined surrounds. In the right return is a flat-roofed Tuscan porch, and in the service wing are casement windows. | II |
