= Dalton Mill =

Mill in Dalton, North Yorkshire, England

Coordinates: 54°28′08″N 1°49′31″W

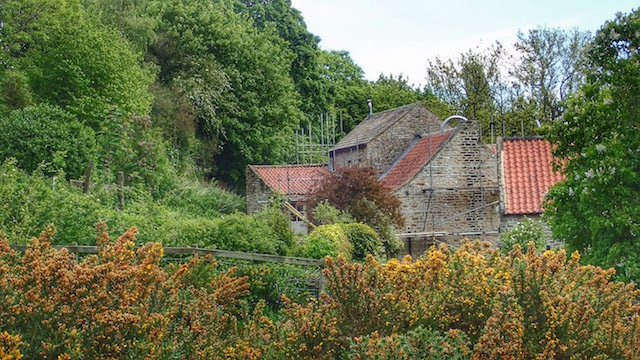
The building, in 2015

Dalton Mill is a historic watermill in Dalton, a village near Richmond, North Yorkshire, in England.

A watermill was recorded on Dalton Beck in the village in 1251, and the current building is probably on the same site. The mill was rebuilt in the early 18th century, with an overshot waterwheel. An extension was added to the front later in the century, to serve as the miller's house. The building was raised to three storeys in the mid 19th century, and the thatched roof was replaced with tile and slate in the 20th century. The mill ceased milling corn in the 1920s; the machinery was then removed, and the building was converted into a private house. The building was grade II listed in 1987.

The mill is built of stone with quoins and roofs of pantile and stone slate. The mill has three storeys, the house at right angles has two storeys, and in the angle is an extension. The windows in the house are sashes, some of them horizontally-sliding “Yorkshire Sliders”. Inside the house is an inglenook fireplace, a millstone which has been set into the first floor, part of a sack hoist, and an early board door on the ground floor which was originally external.

The last miller to operate Dalton Mill was Isaac Rutter. His initials can be found chiselled into stonework at the rear entrance door.

Dalton Mill was purchased by the present owners in 1993.

== See also ==
- Listed buildings in Dalton, west North Yorkshire
