= Listed buildings in Newsham, Richmondshire =

Newsham is a civil parish in the county of North Yorkshire, England. It contains 24 listed buildings that are recorded in the National Heritage List for England. All the listed buildings are designated at Grade II, the lowest of the three grades, which is applied to "buildings of national importance and special interest". The parish contains the village of Newsham and the surrounding countryside. Most of the listed buildings are houses, cottages and associated structures, and the others include farmhouses, a market cross and stocks, a former watermill, a guide post and a bridge.

== Buildings ==
Name and location	Photograph	Date	Notes
Market cross and stocks 54.48536°N 1.83808°W		16th century	The cross is in sandstone, and has an octagonal base on three square steps. On this is a tapering shaft with an inscribed top and a metal spike on four brackets. The stocks, dating from 1828, are to the east. They consist of a pink granite boulder, on the top of which are wrought iron shackles, with a hinge and lock, incorporating three larger holes and one smaller hole.
Foxgrove; 54.48415°N 1.84341°W	—	17th century	The house is in sandstone, and has roofs of pantile and tile, with stone coping and shaped kneelers, and two storeys. The main block has three bays, a plinth, and chamfered rusticated quoins. In the centre is a flat-roofed porch, and the windows are sashes with chamfered quoined surrounds, and lintels dressed as voussoirs. To the left is a two-bay wing containing casement windows, one with a cornice.
Newsham Mill; 54.48472°N 1.83329°W	—	1656 (probable)	The disused watermill, later partly used for other purposes, is in stone with quoins and a stone slate roof. There are two storeys and two bays. It contains various openings, there are external stone steps, and dated and initialled panels, and inside is some surviving mechanism.
Earby Hall; 54.48189°N 1.84128°W	—	Late 17th century	The oldest part is the rear wing, with the front range dating from the early 18th century. The house is in sandstone, with an L-shaped plan, stone slate roofs, shaped kneelers and stone coping. The front range has two storeys and an attic, and four bays. It contains chamfered rusticated quoins, a doorway in an eared architrave with bases, a pulvinated frieze and a pediment. The windows are sashes in architraves. At the rear is a flat-roofed porch, and a round-arched stair window with Tuscan pilasters, and a moulded archivolt with a tripartite keystone.
Outbuilding south of Hill Top; 54.48438°N 1.84146°W	—	Late 17th century	A house later used for other purposes, in stone, with quoins and a stone slate roof. There are two storeys and three bays. On the front is a doorway with chamfered quoined surround and a triangular head. To the right is a doorway with a segmental-arched head, and elsewhere are a stable door and pitching door. At the rear are external stone steps.
Newsham Hall; 54.48603°N 1.83498°W	—	Late 17th to early 18th century	The farmhouse is in stone with a stone slate roof. There are two storeys and a U-shaped plan, with a main range of three bays, a two-bay cross-wing on the left projecting to the rear, and a small right rear wing. The main range has a doorway and sash windows. The cross-wing has a basement, chamfered rusticated quoins, a moulded cornice and a hipped roof. At the rear are mullioned windows.
Central House and cottage 54.48529°N 1.83616°W	—	Early 18th century	The house and cottage to the right are in whitewashed stone, with quoins, and a pantile roof with stone slate lower courses, stone coping and shaped kneelers. There are two storeys and six bays. The house has a doorway with a chamfered surround flanked by bow windows, and sash windows elsewhere. The doorway of the cottage has a quoined surround and the windows are casements.
Building southwest of Central House; 54.48512°N 1.83667°W	—	Early 18th century (probable)	A pair of cottages, later outbuildings, in stone, with quoins, and a pantile roof with stone slate at the eaves, and shaped kneelers. There are two storeys and four bays. On the front are two doorways with quoined surrounds, and four-pane windows.
Gate piers, Newsham Hall; 54.48582°N 1.83516°W	—	Early 18th century	The gate piers are ins sandstone and have a square plan. Each pier has fluted pilasters on the south side, and entablature with a pulvinated frieze, a cornice, a blocking course, and urn finials with swept bases. The gates are in wrought iron.
Boundary House; 54.48562°N 1.83710°W	—	Early to mid-18th century	The house is in stone, with quoins, and a stone slate roof with stone coping and shaped kneelers. There are two storeys, a rear outshut, and three bays. The central doorway has a raised stone surround on bases, and the windows are casements.
Newsham Lodge; 54.49304°N 1.84553°W	—	Mid-18th century	The farmhouse is in sandstone, with quoins, and a tile roof with elaborately-shaped kneelers and stone coping. There are two storeys and an attic, three bays, and a rear wing. In the centre is a doorway with an architrave and an open pedimented hood. The windows on the front are casements with lintels scored as voussoirs, and in the right return is a small sash window.
Woodbine Cottage; 54.48498°N 1.83819°W	—	Mid-18th century (probable)	The house is in stone, with quoins on the left, and a tile roof with a moulded kneeler and stone coping on the left. There are two storeys, three bays, and a rear outshut. The central doorway has a quoined surround and an open pedimented hood on moulded brackets. The window above the door is blind, and the others are casements with deep lintels.
House to east of Woodbine Cottage; 54.48498°N 1.83803°W	—	Mid-18th century	The house is in stone, partly rendered, and has a stone slate roof with moulded kneelers and stone coping. There are two storeys and two bays. The central doorway has a stone surround, and a hood on moulded brackets, with a gable finial. There is one inserted window, and the other windows are horizontally-sliding sashes.
House to south of Woodbine Cottage; 54.48477°N 1.83817°W	—	Mid-18th century	The house is in stone, with quoins, and a stone slate roof with stone coping. There are two storeys and two bays. In the centre is a doorway with a quoined surround, and the windows are sashes, those on the ground floor with deep lintels. stone, witth quoins, and a stone slate roof with stone coping. There are two storeys and two bays. In the centre is a doorway with a quoined surorund, and the windows are sashes, those on the ground floor with deep lintels.
Diamond Napier House; 54.48592°N 1.83430°W	—	1756	The house is in sandstone on a plinth, with chamfered rusticated quoins, sill bands, a moulded cornice, and a stone slate roof with shaped kneelers and stone coping. There are two storeys and three bays. In the centre is a chamfered rusticated porch, inside which are shell niches, and a doorway with a plain surround. Above the porch is a recessed initialled and dated plaque, and above that is a blocked opening in an eared architrave containing a firemark. The windows have quoined surrounds, and lintels with keystones.
Greenbrough; 54.50286°N 1.84025°W	—	Mid to late 18th century	A farmhouse, later a private house, in sandstone, with chamfered rusticated quoins, sill bands, a moulded cornice, and a Welsh slate roof with a shaped kneeler and stone coping on the left, and hipped on the right. There are two storeys and three bays. In the centre is a doorway with a fanlight, and the windows are sashes. The ground floor openings have quoined surrounds. On the upper floor the middle window is blind and contains a sundial, and the outer windows are in architraves with keystones. At the rear is a later canted bay window.
Guide post 54.49538°N 1.82867°W		1774	The guide post stands near a junction opposite Smallways Inn. It is in sandstone, it is about 50 centimetres (20 in) tall, and has a square plan. There is an inscription on each side; on the north side is the date and a benchmark, and the other sides have the names of roads.
Orchard House; 54.48561°N 1.83370°W	—	Late 18th century (probable)	The house is in sandstone, with quoins, and a stone slate roof with stone coping. There are two storeys and three bays. The central doorway has a quoined surround and a fanlight, and the windows are sashes.
Bridge north of Newsham Lodge; 54.49343°N 1.84537°W	—	Late 18th to early 19th century	The bridge carries a track over Dyson Beck. It is in sandstone, and consists of a single segmental arch. The parapets have segmental coping, and the northwest parapet ends in a stone post. The bridge is paved with setts.
Hill Top; 54.48454°N 1.84133°W	—	Late 18th to early 19th century	The house is in sandstone, with quoins, and a stone slate roof with stone coping. There are two storeys and two bays, and a later rear wing on the left. The central doorway has a stone surround with bases, and the windows are sashes with raised stone surrounds.
Broughton House; 54.48306°N 1.83859°W	—	Early 19th century (probable)	The house is in stone, with quoins, and a Westmorland slate roof with moulded bracket kneelers and stone coping. There are two storeys and four bays, the outer bays slightly recessed. In the centre is a cast iron porch and a doorway in an architrave, and the windows are sashes in architraves.
Newsham Grange; 54.50149°N 1.83745°W		Early to mid-19th century	The farmhouse is in sandstone with quoins and a Westmorland slate roof. There are two storeys and a T-shaped plan, with four bays, and a short gable rear wing. On the font is a portico with Roman Doric half-columns, a frieze and a pediment, and the windows are sashes. At the rear is a round-arched stair window.
Coach house, Newsham Grange; 54.50168°N 1.83701°W	—	Early to mid-19th century	The coach house, later used for different purposes, is in stone, with a stone slate roof, and five bays. The middle bay has two storeys and is gabled, and the outer bays have one storey. The first, third and fifth bays contain a round-arched coach opening, and in the other bays and on the upper floor of the middle bay are round-arched windows. Above the central window is a pigeoncote with holes and ledges.
Newsham House; 54.49341°N 1.83502°W	—	Early to mid-19th century	The house is in chamfered rusticated banded stone on a plinth, with a floor band, a dentilled cornice, a parapet and a flat roof. There are two storeys and three bays, the middle bay projecting slightly. In the centre is a porch with two Roman Doric columns, pilasters, a Tuscan frieze, a dentilled cornice and a blocking course. The windows on the front are sashes, and at the rear is a round-arched stair window.
