= Ravensworth Castle (North Yorkshire) =

Castle in North Yorkshire, England

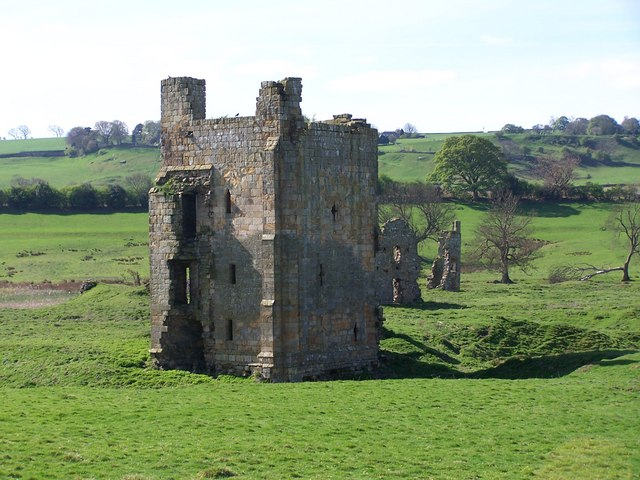

- Location within North Yorkshire

General information
- Location: Ravensworth, United Kingdom
- Coordinates: 54.4598°N 1.7841°W
- Owner: Mrs R Brown (2014)

Ravensworth Castle is a ruined 14th-century castle in the village of Ravensworth, North Yorkshire, England. It has been designated a Grade I listed building by English Heritage.

== History ==
The earliest reference to the castle records a visit from King John in 1201.

The remaining parts of Ravensworth Castle date from the late 14th century, when it belonged to Henry, 1st Baron FitzHugh. In 1391 he enclosed 200 acres (81 ha) around the castle, creating a park. The castle was gradually dismantled, starting in the 16th century, and the stone was used for other buildings in the area.

Ravensworth Castle and Park Wall were given a Grade I listed building designation by English Heritage on 4 February 1969. The Grade I listing is for buildings "of exceptional interest, sometimes considered to be internationally important". The castle and nearby earthworks have been designated a scheduled monument.

== Architecture ==
The castle is located on the south-east side of Ravensworth.

The castle is surrounded by a dry moat. Constructed of sandstone and faced with ashlar, the remaining structure consists of a three-storey tower attached to a gatehouse, with further wall and tower fragments.

== See also ==
- Grade I listed buildings in North Yorkshire (district)
- Listed buildings in Ravensworth
