= Listed buildings in Ravensworth =

Ravensworth is a civil parish in the county of North Yorkshire, England. It contains 26 listed buildings that are recorded in the National Heritage List for England. Of these, one is listed at Grade I, the highest of the three grades, and the others are at Grade II, the lowest grade. The parish contains the village of Ravensworth and the surrounding area. The most important building in the parish is the ruined Ravensworth Castle and Park Wall, which is listed at Grade I. Most of the other listed buildings are houses, cottages and associated structures, and farmhouses. The others include a cross base, a pound and an animal enclosure, two bridges, and a village hall.

== Key ==
Grade	Criteria
I	Buildings of exceptional interest, sometimes considered to be internationally important
II	Buildings of national importance and special interest

== Buildings ==
Name and location	Photograph	Date	Notes	Grade
Ravensworth Castle and Park Wall; 54.46394°N 1.78246°W		Late 14th century	The castle is largely in ruins, the main surviving part being the three-storey gatehouse tower and the adjoining entrance arch to the castle. Elsewhere, the remains include fragments of the curtain wall, fragments of two towers, part of the belfry tower, and a central rectangular range. The Park Wall is in sandstone and survives almost intact, and is about 2 metres (6 ft 7 in) in height.	I
Cross Base; 54.46619°N 1.78424°W		16th century (possible)	The cross base on The Green is in stone with a square plan, the upper corners chamfered and broach-stopped. On the upper surface is a bump.	II
Tofta House; 54.46562°N 1.78109°W	—	Late 16th to early 17th century	The farmhouse is in stone, with quoins, and a Welsh slate roof with moulded stone coping and shaped kneelers. There are two storeys and a T-shaped plan, with a front range of four bays, and a central rear wing. The doorway has a stone surround and the windows are sashes.	II
Park House; 54.46609°N 1.78524°W	—	Mid to late 17th century	The house, which was later extended, is in stone, with a roof of Westmorland slate at the front, and later slate at the rear. The early part forms the left rear wing, there is a service wing on the right rear, and the later front range has two storeys, and four bays. It has a plinth, quoins and a cornice, and contains a doorway with engaged fluted Tuscan columns, a fluted frieze with paterae, a cornice and a blocking course, and the windows are sashes.	II
Mill Farmhouse Cottage; 54.46784°N 1.78547°W	—	1699	The cottage is in stone, with quoins, and a clay pantile roof with stone coping. There is a single storey and three bays. On the front is a doorway with a chamfered quoined surround, and a dated and initialled lintel, and the windows are sashes.	II
39 The Green; 54.46555°N 1.78489°W	—	c. 1700	The house is in stone, with chamfered rusticated quoins and a concrete tile roof. There are two storeys and three bays. The central doorway and the windows, which are sashes, have architraves. At the rear is a later outshut containing a doorway with an architrave.	II
Pound; 54.46526°N 1.78258°W	—	18th century (probable)	The pound has stone walls surrounding an irregular oval enclosure. The walls are about 1 metre (3 ft 3 in) in height, and at the northeast end is an opening with gate posts.	II
West View Cottage; 54.46534°N 1.78460°W	—	c. 1760	A house, later two cottages, in stone, partly whitewashed, with a stone slate roof to the left, and a tile roof with stone slates at the eaves to the right, with stone coping and a shaped kneeler. There are two storeys, two bays, and an extension to the right. In the centre of the main range is a doorway with a stone surround and a projecting slab above, and the windows are sashes. On the extension are two doorways with quoined surrounds.	II
20 The Green and outbuilding 54.46693°N 1.78439°W	—	Mid to late 18th century	Two cottages combined into one house, in stone, with quoins on the left, and a pantile roof with stone slates at the eaves, a shaped kneeler and stone coping on the left. There are two storeys and three bays. On the front is a doorway with a stone surround on bases, and sash windows. To the left is a single-storey outbuilding with quoins on the right, a sliding door, a doorway with a quoined surround, and windows.	II
Enclosure for livestock 54.46609°N 1.78588°W	—	Mid to late 18th century	The enclosure is in sandstone with quoins, and forms a quadrant in plan. In the outer wall is a doorway with a chamfered quoined surround, and the inner walls have paired doorways with quoined surrounds, giving access to two vaulted chambers.	II
Coach house west of Park House; 54.46596°N 1.78583°W	—	Mid to late 18th century	The former coach house is in sandstone, with quoins, and a pantile roof with stone slates at the eaves, and stone coping. There are two storeys and three bays, the right bay slightly recessed. On the front are four segmental-arched coach openings, hayloft openings, and a doorway with interrupted jambs. On both returns are external stone steps.	II
Cart shed north of Tofta House; 54.46563°N 1.78074°W	—	Late 18th century	The cart shed, later used for other purposes, in sandstone, with quoins, and a roof partly of Welsh slate and partly of stone slate, coped on the right. There is a single storey and four bays. The building contains three segmental-arched cart openings and a doorway, all with quoined surrounds, and a window.	II
Ash Cottage and outbuilding 54.46709°N 1.78561°W	—	1786	The house and outbuilding are in sandstone. The house has quoins, and a stone slate roof with stone coping and shaped kneelers. There are two storeys and two bays. The central doorway has a stone surround, and above it are the remains of a medieval inscription under an open pediment on moulded brackets. The windows are sashes, and one lintel is inscribed with initials and a date. The outbuilding to the right, at one time a shop, has a pantile roof coped on the right, and one storey. It contains a segmental-arched opening and a small window.	II
30 The Green; 54.46670°N 1.78358°W	—	Late 18th to early 19th century	The house is in sandstone, with quoins and an artificial stone slate roof. There are two storeys and two bays. The central doorway has an architrave with splayed bases, and an open pediment on moulded brackets, and the windows are sashes.	II
Holme Bridge; 54.46844°N 1.78348°W		Late 18th to early 19th century	The bridge formerly carried a road over Holme Beck. It is in sandstone, and consists of a single segmental arch with voussoirs. The bridge has spandrels, and parapets with square coping stones. Above the centre of the arch, on both sides, is a rectangular stone.	II
Mill Farmhouse and wall 54.46806°N 1.78560°W	—	Late 18th to early 19th century	The farmhouse, which was later extended, is in stone with quoins, and has a Roman pantile roof with stone slates at the eaves, shaped kneelers and stone copings. There are two storeys, the older part on the left has two bays, and contains a doorway and casement windows. The later part is taller with one bay, and contains a doorway with a stone surround and an open pediment on moulded brackets with paterae, and sash windows. The garden wall is in cobbles with segmental stone coping, and contains two doorways with quoined surrounds.	II
Park Farmhouse; 54.46591°N 1.78500°W	—	Late 18th to early 19th century	The house is in stone, with quoins, and a pantile,roof with stone slates at the eaves, shaped kneelers and stone coping. There are two storeys and two bays. The central doorway has a stone surround on bases, and the windows are sashes.	II
Cowhouse west of Park House; 54.46603°N 1.78549°W	—	Late 18th to early 19th century	The former cowhouse is in sandstone, with quoins on the left, and a stone slate roof, coped on the left and hipped to the right. There is a single storey and five bays. The building contains a central segmental-arched cart opening, and doorways, one with a quoined surround.	II
24 The Green; 54.46680°N 1.78397°W	—	Early 19th century	The house is in sandstone, with quoins on the left, and a stone slate roof with stone coping on the left. There are two storeys and three bays. The central doorway has a stone surround on bases, and an open pediment on undercut brackets with paterae, and the windows are sashes.	II
28 The Green; 54.46677°N 1.78374°W	—	Early 19th century	The house is in sandstone, with quoins on the right, and a stone slate roof. There are two storeys and three bays. In the right bay is a segmental-arched carriageway. The doorway has a stone surround, and the windows are sashes.	II
Walls and railings, 24, 26 and 28 The Green; 54.46675°N 1.78394°W	—	Early 19th century	The walls to the front gardens are in stone, and have wrought iron railings. The walls are partly coped, and the railings have spear finials.	II
Bridge over Holme Beck; 54.46889°N 1.78678°W		Early 19th century	The footbridge crossing the stream is in sandstone, and consists of a single segmental arch of voussoirs. Above the arch are carved stones moved from another site.	II
The Green; 54.46676°N 1.78385°W	—	Early 19th century	The house is in stone with a stone slate roof. There are two storeys and one bay. To the left is a doorway with an architrave and a slab pediment on moulded brackets, and the windows are sashes.	II
Sunset Cottage; 54.46789°N 1.78493°W	—	Early to mid-19th century	The house is in stone, with quoins, and a Welsh slate roof with stone coping. The central doorway has a stone surround, and the windows are sashes.	II
Village Hall; 54.46575°N 1.78400°W	—	1841	A school, later the village hall, in stone, with quoins, and a Welsh slate roof with shaped kneelers and stone coping. There is one storey and three bays. The windows have pointed arches, and contain Y-tracery. In the left return is a porch and a casement window, and on the roof is cast iron ventilator.	II
Ravensworth Lodge and outbuilding 54.47959°N 1.77986°W	—	Mid-19th century	The house and outbuilding are in stone with quoins. The house has a Welsh slate roof with stone coping, two storeys and three bays. The central doorway has a stone surround, an open pediment on brackets and a finial, and the windows are sashes. The outbuilding to the left has a stone slate roof with stone coping, and a single storey. It contains a doorway and two flanking windows.	II
