= Listed buildings in Kirby Hill, Richmondshire =

Kirby Hill is a civil parish in the county of North Yorkshire, England. It contains 20 listed buildings that are recorded in the National Heritage List for England. Of these, one is listed at Grade I, the highest of the three grades, one is at Grade II*, the middle grade, and the others are at Grade II, the lowest grade. The parish contains the village of Kirby Hill and the surrounding area. Apart from a lime kiln, all the listed buildings are in the village. Most of these are houses, cottages and associated strictures, and the others include a church, memorials in the churchyard, a former school, and almshouses.

== Key ==
Grade	Criteria
I	Buildings of exceptional interest, sometimes considered to be internationally important
II*	Particularly important buildings of more than special interest
II	Buildings of national importance and special interest

== Buildings ==
Name and location	Photograph	Date	Notes	Grade
Church of St Peter and St Felix; 54.45461°N 1.78520°W		12th century	The church has been altered and extended through the centuries, and the tower is dated 1397. The church is built in stone with stone slate roofs, and consists of a nave with a clerestory, north and south aisles, a south porch, a chancel with north vestries and a west tower. The tower has three stages, a chamfered plinth, a stepped diagonal buttress on the left with an inscription, the date, and at the top is a carved figure. On its right is a stair turret, in the bottom stage is a west window with a pointed arch, the middle stage contains clock faces, and the bell openings have two lights. Above them is a string course with gargoyles and shields, and an embattled parapet.	I
The Old Grammar School, Grammar School House, wall and railings 54.45440°N 1.78495°W		1556	A school, with the master's house added in 1706, later used for other purposes. It is in stone with stone slate roofs. The main range has two storeys, a partial attic and a partial basement, to the left is the two-bay master's house, and to the right is a three-bay former school. The main range overlooks the churchyard of Church of St Peter and St Felix, it has buttresses, and contains various windows, some mullioned, and dormers. In front is a low wall with canted coping and railings.	II*
Holme Garth; 54.45377°N 1.78496°W	—	Late 16th or early 17th century	A house, at one time an inn, in stone, with quoins, and a stone slate roof with stone coping and shaped kneelers. There are two storeys and three bays, and an outshut on the front. Most of the windows are casements, and on the front is a porch with a chamfered surround, and an internal doorway with a chamfered surround and a lintel with a triangular soffit.	II
Chaytor Cottage, West Cottage and West Hall; 54.45434°N 1.78629°W	—	Early 17th century (probable)	A house divided into three in stone, with quoins and stone slate roofs. There are two storeys and an irregular T-shaped plan, with ranges of four and two bays. Most of the windows are double-chamfered and mullioned.	II
East House and Kir-Kot; 54.45392°N 1.78491°W		1678	A pair of houses in stone, with quoins, and a stone slate roof with stone coping and shaped kneelers. There are two storeys and three bays. On the front are two doorways, both with quoined surrounds, and the left doorway has a moulded arris, a lintel with two recessed panels inscribed with initials and the date, and a hood mould. In the left bay are casement windows, and the other bays contain mullioned windows with hood moulds.	II
East Cottage; 54.45426°N 1.78492°W	—	Early 18th century	The cottage is rendered, and has a pantile roof with stone coping. There are two storeys, one bay, and a rear outshut. On the front is a doorway, and a casement window in each floor.	II
Manor Cottage; 54.45389°N 1.78563°W		Early 18th century	The cottage is in stone, with quoins on the right, and a stone slate roof with stone coping and a shaped kneeler on the right.. There are two storeys and two bays. The doorway on the left has an architrave and a tripartite keystone, and the windows are sashes.	II
Manor House, walls and railings 54.45386°N 1.78549°W		Early 18th century	The house, at one time a school, is in stone, with rusticated quoins, and a stone slate roof with stone coping and shaped kneelers. There are two storeys and five bays. In the centre is a doorway with an architrave, and the windows are sashes with moulded sills. In front is a low wall and wrought iron railings, the standards with cast iron urn finials.	II
Rose Cottage; 54.45377°N 1.78512°W		Early 18th century	The house is in stone, with quoins, and a stone slate roof with stone coping and shaped kneelers. There are three storeys and one bay. The doorway on the right has a plain surround and a hood of slabs forming an open pediment. The windows in the lower two floors are sashes, and in the top floor is a casement window.	II
Shaw memorial 54.45464°N 1.78545°W	—	c. 1733	The memorial is a tombstone in the churchyard of the Church of St Peter and St Felix to the east of the church, and is to the memory of May Shaw. It is in sandstone, and consists of a slab with a double-scrolled top, and moulding dividing it into two panels, each with an ogee head. Over the panels are two angels' heads with sun's rays above, and in the left panel is an inscription.	II
East Farmhouse; 54.45407°N 1.78487°W	—	Early to mid 18th century	The farmhouse is in stone, with quoins, and a Welsh slate roof with stone coping and shaped kneelers. There are two storeys, and an L-shaped plan, with a front range of two bays, and a rear wing. The central doorway has an architrave, the windows in the left bay are sashes, and in the right bay they are casements.	II
Smith memorial 54.45465°N 1.78487°W	—	c. 1749	The memorial is a tombstone in the churchyard of the Church of St Peter and St Felix to the east of the church, and is to the memory of Samuel Smith. It is in sandstone, and consists of a slab with a wave-shaped top and an inscription.	II
Church View and Ivy Cottage; 54.45380°N 1.78529°W		18th century	Two cottages in stone, with stone slate roofs, stone coping and shaped kneelers. There are storeys and three bays. The left cottage has a doorway and casement windows. To its right is a bay containing a segmental-arched carriageway with voussoirs and a quoined jamb, and a casement window above. The right cottage has a doorway with a quoined surround and an inscribed and dated lintel, a square bay window to the right, and a casement window above.	II
Two Stapylton memorials 54.45430°N 1.78449°W	—	Mid 18th century	The memorials are two adjacent tombstones in the churchyard of the Church of St Peter and St Felix to the southeast of the church. They are to the memory of members of the Stapylton family, and each is a slab in sandstone. Both slabs have shaped tops and contain various motifs, decorations and inscriptions.	II
Dakyn House; 54.45402°N 1.78590°W		1754	Almshouses in stone with quoins and a stone slate roof. There are two storeys, a double depth plan and four bays at the front. Most of the windows are mullioned, and all the openings have architraves. On the front are two plaques, one with the name, and the other a circular plaque with an inscription and the date of foundation.	II
Lime kiln 54.45351°N 1.79007°W		Mid to late 18th century	The lime kiln is in stone, and consists of two hearths side by side. Each hearth has a semi-elliptical plan and a segmental-pointed arch.	II
Bell memorial 54.45454°N 1.78477°W	—	c. 1770	The memorial is a tombstone in the churchyard of the Church of St Peter and St Felix to the southeast of the church, and is to the memory of members of the Ball family. It is in sandstone and consists of a slab with a shaped top in the form of a scrolled pediment with paterae. It has a moulded frame and a central division forming two panels, each with an angel's head and wings above an inscription.	II
Fawcett memorial 54.45463°N 1.78562°W	—	c. 1804	The memorial is a tombstone in the churchyard of the Church of St Peter and St Felix to the west of the church, and is to the memory of John Fawcett. It is in sandstone, and consists of a slab with a scrolled top containing an acanthus-leaf sunburst in a central scroll, flanked by paterae in side scrolls.	II
Railings in front of Rose Cottage, Ivy Cottage and Church View; 54.45383°N 1.78521°W	—	Early 19th century	The walls are in stone with segmental coping. The wall in front of Rose Cottage has a quadrant plan, and there are separate walls to the other cottages. The railings are in wrought iron, the standards with cast iron urn finials.	II
Thompson chest tomb and railed enclosure 54.45485°N 1.78537°W	—	Early to mid 19th century	The chest tomb is in the churchyard of the Church of St Peter and St Felix to the north of the tower, and is to the memory of members of the Thompson family. It is in sandstone and has a coped lid, balustered corners and a plinth, and there are inscriptions on the lid and the side panels. The tomb is enclosed by wrought iron railings with four octagonal corner posts.	II
