= Dalton Hall, North Yorkshire =

Historic building in North Yorkshire, England

Coordinates: 54.4764°N 1.8308°W

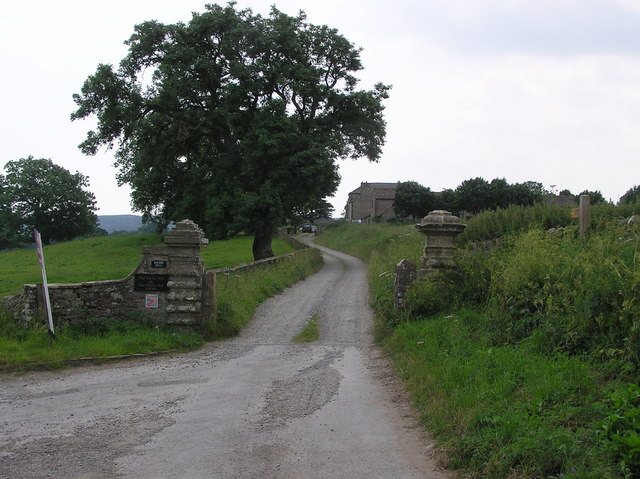
The building, in 2006

Dalton Hall is a historic building in Dalton, west North Yorkshire, near Richmond, North Yorkshire, in England.

The building was constructed in the 15th century, as a fortified manor house in the form of a tower. It was altered in about 1600, then in the early 19th century there was a two-bay extension, followed in the middle of the century by a service wing. It was restored in the 20th century, and was grade II* listed in 1969.

The hall is built of stone on a continuous plinth, with artificial stone slate roofs. The tower has three storeys and three bays, and a hipped roof. It contains quoins, a canted bay window on a bowed base, and sash windows on the front. At the rear is a French window with a double-chamfered surround, and a two-light double-chamfered mullion window with a hood mould. The left wing has two storeys and two bays, and contains a doorway with a fanlight containing radial glazing, and an open pediment on moulded brackets with paterae, and sash windows. The right wing has two storeys and one bay, and contains a doorway with a stone surround, and casement windows. Inside, the kitchen has a large, early fireplace, with a massive chimney above, supported by corbels.

== See also ==
- Grade II* listed buildings in North Yorkshire (district)
- Listed buildings in Dalton, west North Yorkshire
