= Didderston =

Didderston: Grange Castle
- Location within the United Kingdom
- Civil parish: Melsonby
- Shire county: North Yorkshire
- Country: England
- Sovereign state: United Kingdom

Didderston (Medieval Latin: Dirdreston, also referred to in Late Latin as Vilfaraesdun, Old English: Ƿilfaresdún), was a medieval manor located in Melsonby parish, North Yorkshire, United Kingdom. It was recorded in Domesday as Dirdreston Grange, and has since been identified as being located around Diddersley Hill, and Low Grange and High Grange farms. Didderston has a long history spanning potentially from as early as 651 A.D. until the 17th century.

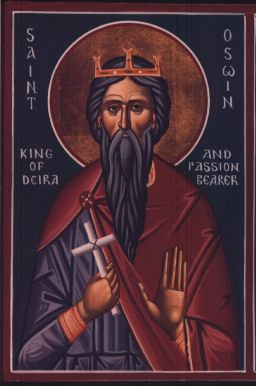
St Oswin, King of Deira, who was martyred at Gilling, after having disbanded his army which was staged at Diddersley Hill, 20 August 651.

Bede described the death of King Oswine in 651 and wrote about a place called "Wilfaresdun, that is, Wilfar's Hill, which is almost ten miles distant from the village called Cataract towards the north-west. He himself [King Oswin], with only one trusty soldier, whose name was Tonhere, withdrew and lay concealed in the house of Earl Hunwald, whom he imagined to be his most assured friend. But, alas! it was otherwise; for the earl betrayed him, and Oswy, in a detestable manner, by the hands of his commander, Ethilwin, slew him..." In the text given to us by Bede:

Remisit exercitum quem congregaverat, ac singulos domum redire praecepit, a loco qui vocatur Vilfaraesdun, id est Mons Vilfari, et set a vico Cataractone decem ferme millibus passum contra solistitialem occasum secretus: divertitque ipse cum uno tantum milite sibi fidelissimo, nomine Tondheri, celandus in domo comitis Hunualdi, quem etiam ipsum sibi amicissimum autumabat. Sed, heu, proh dolor! longe aliter erat: nam ab eodem comite proditum eum Osuiu, eum praefato ipsius milite per praefectum suum Ediluinum detestanda omnibus morte interfecit. Quod factum est die decima tertia Kalendarum Septembrium, anno regni eius nono, in loco qui dicitur Ingetlingum.

Understanding this to describe a prominent hill located ten Roman miles (i.e. about 9 imperial miles along the old Roman road) northwest of Catterick, then we are left with one possible location for Wilfar's Hill: Diddersley Hill.

Apart from this 7th century reference to Didderston's possible history, at least a part of Didderston manor had been well documented as a grange of Jervaulx Cistercian Abbey at least as early as the 13th century and was known to have been one of the manors belonging to Thorfin of Ravensworth, the "horse thegn to the Earl of Northumbria" during the reign of Edward the Confessor. This fact further supports the idea that Didderston was indeed once known as Wilfar's Hill, since Ravensworth is only about 3 miles from Wilfar's Hill (i.e. Diddersley Hill). Thorfin is the earliest known lord of the manor of Didderston from whom a continuous line of succession can be traced, and thus he is considered the first lord.

== The Manor and Lordship of Didderston ==
In 1086 the manor of Didderston, called Dirdreston Grange, was home to 9.5 households, consisting of four carucates, which would be approximately 480 acres:

In Malsenebi and Dirdreston, a berewick, for geld, eleven carucates, and ten ploughs may be [there]. Torfin had one manor there; now, Bodin has one plough there, and fifteen villanes and three bordars with seven ploughs. A church is there, and a priest. The whole, one leuga in length and one in breadth. T. R. E., it was worth forty shillings; now, thirty shillings. In this vill there are four caucates for geld, of which the soke belongs to Ghellinges.

— Domesday Book for Yorkshire, The Yorkshire Archaeological Journal, Volume 13, p. 534 (1895)

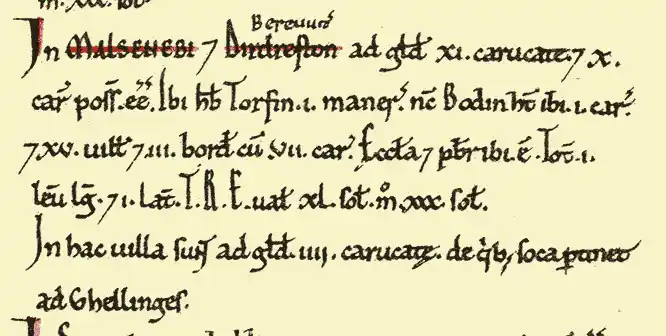
Domesday Entry for Didderston Grange

Still visible today, are the remains of Grange Castle - a rectangular earthwork about 200 ft x 120 ft enclosed within a larger rectangular moated earthwork. Composite LiDAR imagery shows that the structure was built on an ancient riverbed and appears to have used the inlet stream to feed a moat. Although the Domesday Book mentions Thorfin's manor at Melsonby, it makes no mention of any structure at Didderston and so it is possible that there was no structure at Didderston during the time of Domesday. However, since there was a corresponding soke (which belonged to Gilling) and Didderston is listed as a berewick and a vill, it is probable that it wasn't simply uninhabited land, but rather that there was a structure which was subject to the judicial authority associated with vills and sokes. Although no records of the structure prior to the 13th century exist, it seems possible that the structure could have Anglo Saxon origins, given the antiquity of the region as evidence by numerous Iron Age and Roman artifacts found around Didderston, especially the Stanwick Hoard, found at Melsonby.

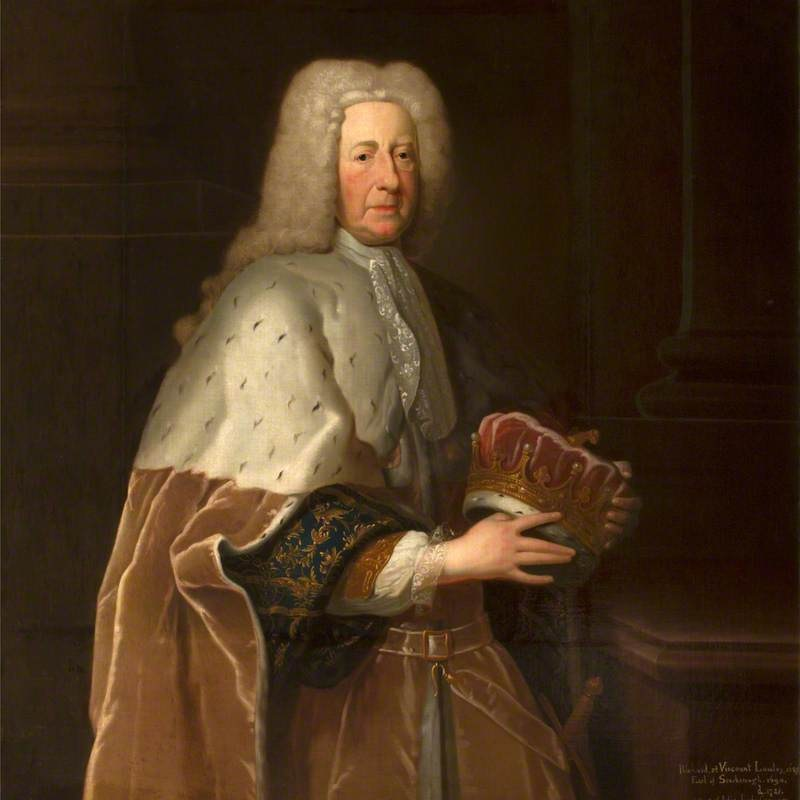
Thomas Bruce, 3rd Earl of Elgin, 2nd Earl of Ailesbury, 17th Lord of the Manor of Didderston

Bodin of Penthièvre, a half-brother of Count Alan Rufus of Brittany, was the 2nd lord of Didderston in 1086 and happens to be a far removed second cousin of the current lord of the manor. Bodin later desired to become a monk and subsequently gave his lands (to include Didderston) to his brother, Bardulf. The manor of Didderston remained in the family for the next three centuries, when Bardulf's 5x great-grandson, Adam FitzHugh (the 10th Lord of the Manor), inherited Didderston from his deceased father in 1305. Upon Adam's death he conveyed the manor of Didderston to Jervaulx Abbey. The manor was retained by the abbey for the next two centuries until the Dissolution of the Monasteries, when the abbey was dissolved in 1537 and the manor was remitted to the Crown. However, it was then in 1544 that King Henry VIII granted Didderston to Matthew, 4th Earl of Lennox and his heirs. Matthew's eldest son died young and his second son and heir, Charles, came to possess the lordship of Didderston as the 12th lord, and thence it passed again to the Crown upon his death. Although he had a daughter, Lady Arbella Stuart, the manor was granted to Edward Bruce of Kinloss in 1603 by King James I, twelve years before the death of Lady Arbella - suggesting that Arbella was not Lady of the Manor in her own right. Having had a crucial role in the accession of King James I, Edward Bruce of Kinloss was given the manor of Didderston. Eventually, the manorial lordship passed to his great-grandson, Thomas Bruce, 2nd Earl of Ailesbury, who, through his paternal grandmother, Anne Chichester, is a far removed 6th cousin of the current lord of the manor. Following the 2nd Earl's imprisonment in the Tower in February 1696 and subsequent exile in 1697, the lordship of Didderston fell into abeyance by 1699, and having not been conveyed as a part of Ailesbury estates to the 3rd Earl of Ailesbury, has since been conveyed to the current 18th lord of the manor.
