= Kirby Hill, Richmondshire =

Village and civil parish in North Yorkshire, England

Coordinates: 54°27′15″N 1°47′08″W

Kirby Hill
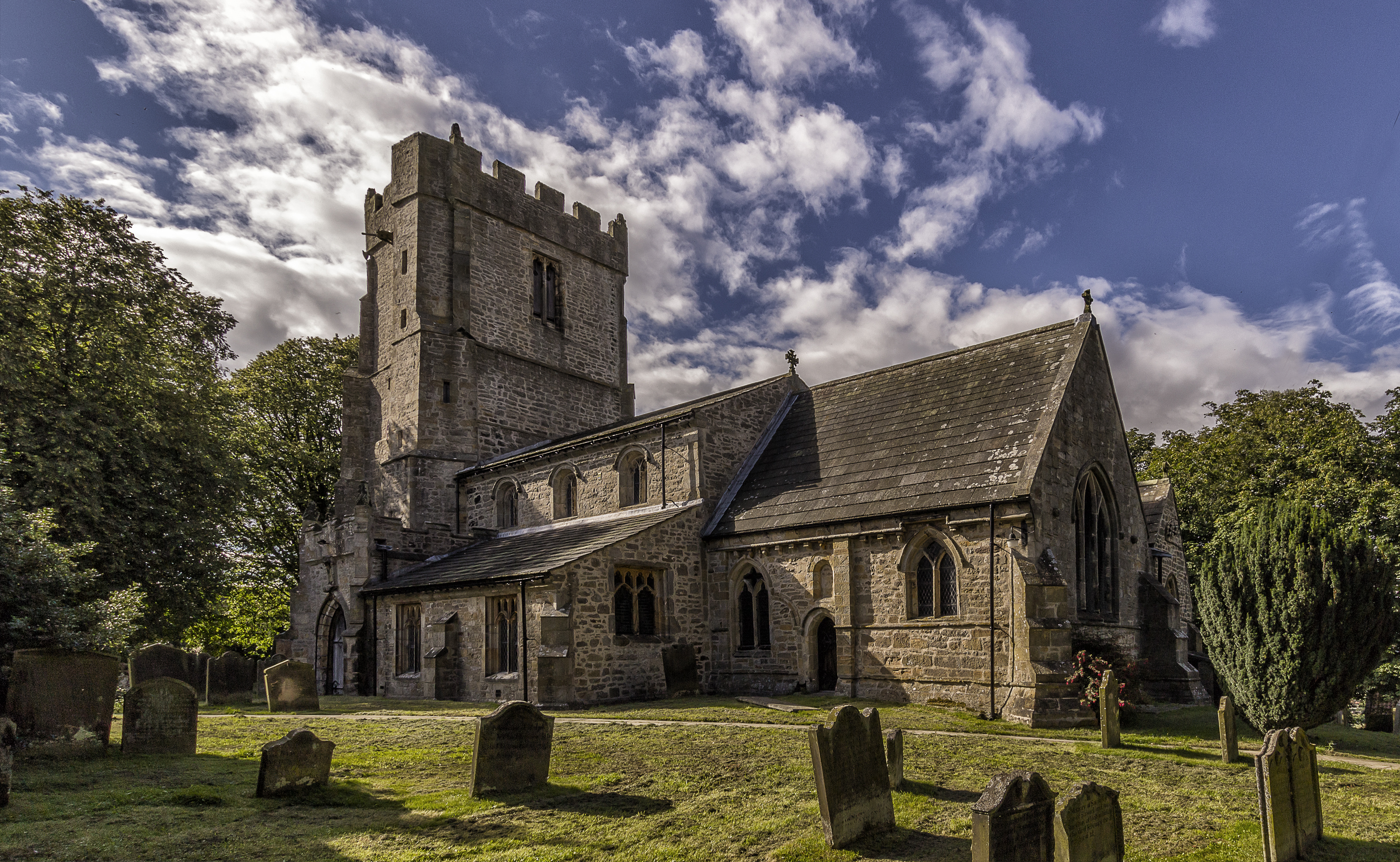
- Parish church of SS Peter and Felix

- Location within North Yorkshire
- Population: 60
- OS grid reference: NZ139065
- Civil parish: Kirby Hill
- Unitary authority: North Yorkshire
- Ceremonial county: North Yorkshire
- Region: Yorkshire and the Humber
- Country: England
- Sovereign state: United Kingdom
- Post town: Richmond
- Postcode district: DL11
- Dialling code: 01748
- Police: North Yorkshire
- Fire: North Yorkshire
- Ambulance: Yorkshire
- UK Parliament: Richmond and Northallerton
- Website: https://kirbyhillpc.org.uk/

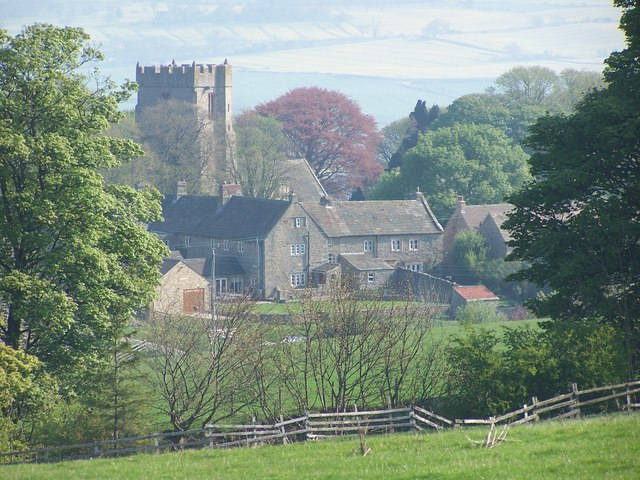
Kirby Hill

Kirby Hill, historically also known as Kirby-on-the-Hill, is a village and civil parish in the county of North Yorkshire, England. The village is about 1 mile (1.6 km) south of Ravensworth and about 4 miles (6 km) north-west of the town of Richmond.

The parish population is about 60. At the 2011 census, it was less than 100. Population data about Kirby Hill is now included in population data about the parish of Gayles.

Kirby Hill was a township in the parish of Kirkby Ravensworth until 1866, when it was made a separate civil parish. From 1974 to 2023 it was part of the district of Richmondshire, it is now administered by the unitary North Yorkshire Council.

As early as 1859, the centre of the village green featured "a beautiful spring". It continued to be used by residents until at least 1932. Sir Nikolaus Pevsner described Kirby Hill as "a perfect village, but ... also ... exceptional".

== Parish church ==
The Church of England parish church of Sts Peter and Felix historically served the large ancient parish of Kirkby Ravensworth. It was built in the 12th century on the site of a previous Anglo-Saxon church.

The east window of the chancel was added in the 13th century. Several other features were added in the 14th century, including the vestry, the north aisle, the south porch, several new windows, and the west tower (built in 1397). And the clerestory and south aisle were added in the 15th century. The church is a Grade I listed building.

== Grammar school ==
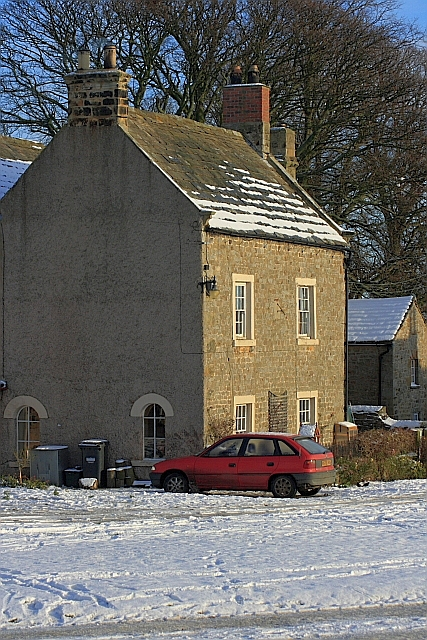
The Old Grammar School

Dr John Dakyn, a 16th-century vicar of Kirby Ravensworth, left a legacy to fund the establishment of The Grammar School in the village. It was built in 1556 and enlarged in 1706.

Notable alumni of the grammar school include Matthew Hutton (1693–1758), who was born in the village and was made archbishop of Canterbury in 1757; the astronomer William Lax (1761–1836) and the antiquarian and the topographer James Raine (1791–1858).

The school closed in 1957, just one year after its 400th anniversary. The former school's building is now a private house and a Grade II* listed building.

== Amenities ==
Kirby Hill has an 18th-century public house, the Shoulder of Mutton.

== See also ==
- Listed buildings in Kirby Hill, Richmondshire

== Bibliography ==
- Lewis, Samuel, ed. (1931) [1848]. "Kirkby-Ravensworth". A Topographical Dictionary of England (Seventh ed.). London: Samuel Lewis. pp. 692–697.
- Page, William, ed. (1914). "Kirkby Ravensworth". A History of the County of York North Riding. Victoria County History. Vol. I. London: Constable & Co. pp. 87–97.
- Pevsner, Nikolaus (1966). Yorkshire: the North Riding. The Buildings of England. Harmondsworth: Penguin Books. p. 209. ISBN 0-14-071029-9.
- Whellan, T (1859). History and topography of the city of York: and the North Riding of Yorkshire: embracing a general review of the early history of Great Britain, and a general history and description of the County of York. Printed for the publishers, by John Green. pp. 500–.
