= Dalton, west North Yorkshire =

Village and civil parish in North Yorkshire, England

Coordinates: 54°28′16″N 1°49′26″W

Dalton
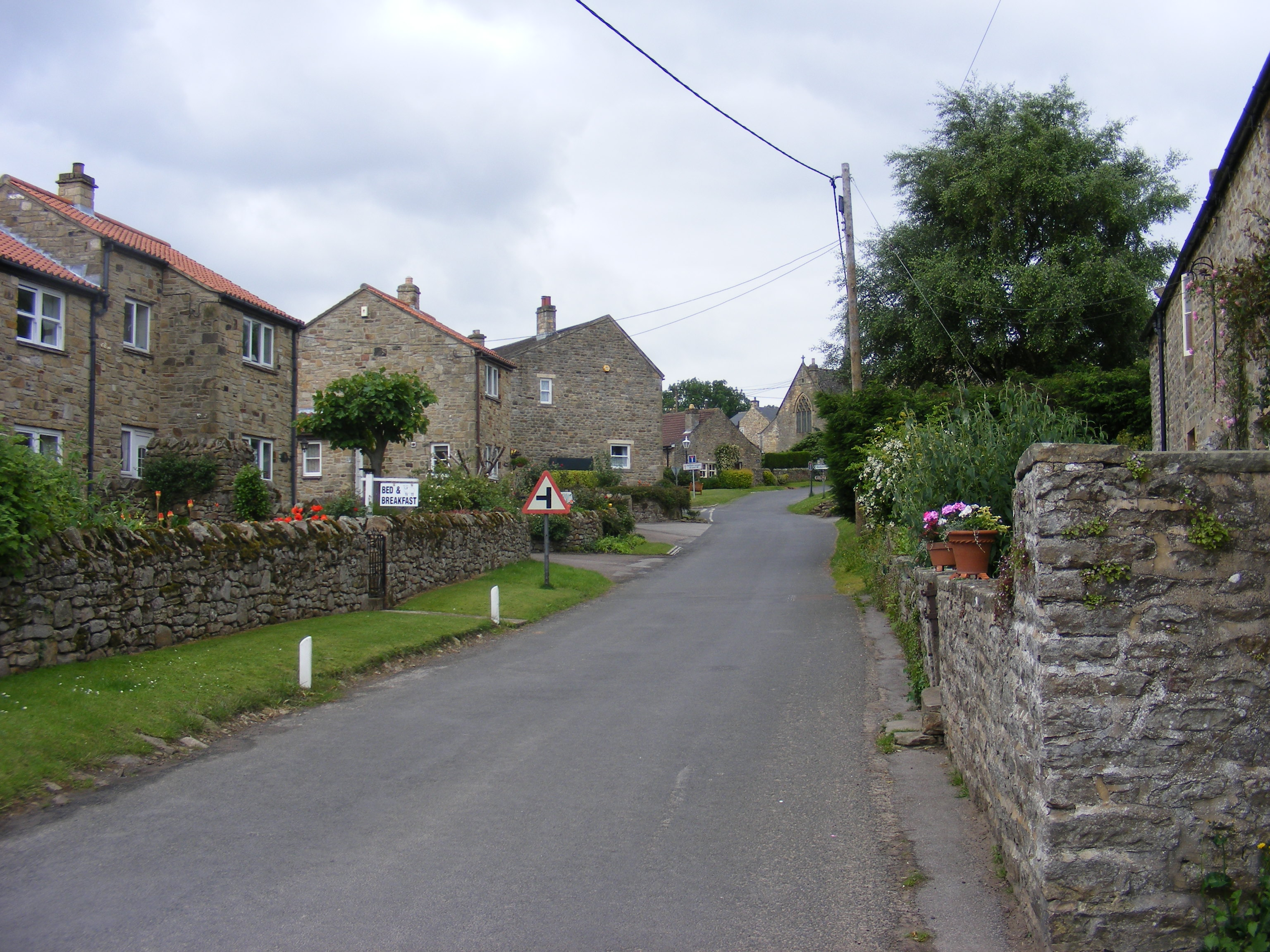
- Looking through Dalton

- Location within North Yorkshire
- Population: 181 (2011 census)
- OS grid reference: NZ114084
- Unitary authority: North Yorkshire
- Ceremonial county: North Yorkshire
- Region: Yorkshire and the Humber
- Country: England
- Sovereign state: United Kingdom
- Post town: RICHMOND
- Postcode district: DL11
- Dialling code: 01833
- Police: North Yorkshire
- Fire: North Yorkshire
- Ambulance: Yorkshire
- UK Parliament: Richmond and Northallerton

Dalton is a village and civil parish in North Yorkshire in England. Dalton is situated about six miles north-west of Richmond and about five miles south-east of Barnard Castle, close to the A66 trans-Pennine trunk road. It was listed in the Domesday Book. The Dalton parish boundary includes the village itself as well the houses at Dalton Heights (off the road to Newsham) plus numerous surrounding farms. The population of the parish was 147 according to the 2001 census, increasing to 181 at the 2011 Census.

From 1974 to 2023 it was part of the district of Richmondshire, it is now administered by the unitary North Yorkshire Council.

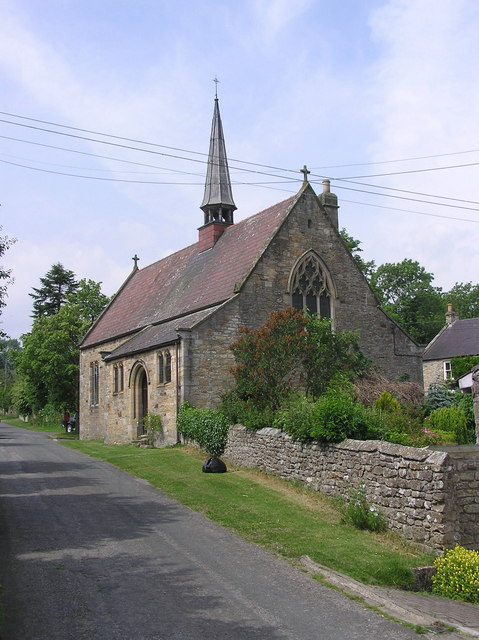
The Church of St James, built in 1897, architect W. S. Hicks

Dalton includes a farming community, both arable and stock, and is sited on a stream or beck which is a tributary of the River Swale. The Dalton & Gayles Village Hall, which is shared with the neighbouring village of Gayles, is located in Dalton; there is also St James' Church, Dalton, an Anglican chapel built in 1897.

The name Dalton comes from Old English and means farmstead or village in a valley.

To the South of Dalton there are the remains of a camp called ‘Castle Steads’, and further south there is a block of stone called ‘Stone Man’ which used to be a landmark, until the stones were taken away to make fences. A mile south-east of the Stone Man, a stone chest was found which had a ‘kale pot’, said to have contained money.

Dalton Hall, north-west of the village, dates from the 15th century. Dalton Mill was built in the early 18th century and operated until the 1920s.

In 1835, an allowance of £40 was given to the schoolmaster by the Kirby-Ravensworth hospital for the education of the poor children. By 1890, there was a mixed school attended by 50 students.

== See also ==
- Listed buildings in Dalton, west North Yorkshire
