= Whashton =

Village and civil parish in North Yorkshire, England

Coordinates: 54.45114°N 1.7694°W

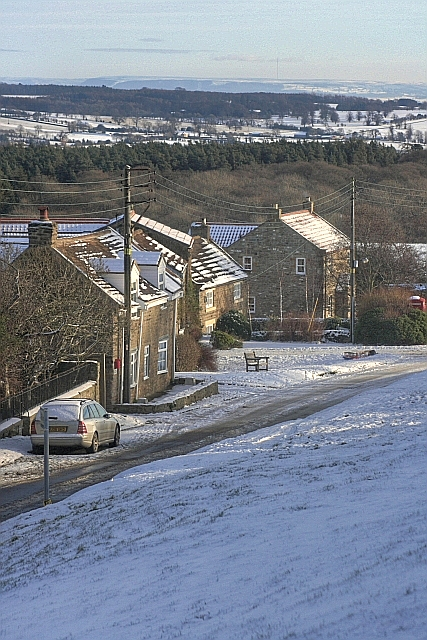

- Location within North Yorkshire
- Population: 215 (Including Aske.2011)
- OS grid reference: NZ150062
- Unitary authority: North Yorkshire
- Ceremonial county: North Yorkshire
- Region: Yorkshire and the Humber
- Country: England
- Sovereign state: United Kingdom
- Post town: Richmond
- Postcode district: DL11
- Police: North Yorkshire
- Fire: North Yorkshire
- Ambulance: Yorkshire

Whashton is a village and civil parish in North Yorkshire, England. It lies 4 miles (6 km) north of Richmond and 1.5 miles (2.4 km) south of the A66.

From 1974 to 2023 it was part of the district of Richmondshire. It is now administered by the unitary North Yorkshire Council.

== History ==
The name is of an uncertain origin and could either be taken from a personal name (Hwaessa) or the farm/settlement at the sharp, pointed place (Hwaessing). The village (with an older spelling) is sometimes cited as the origin of the family name of George Washington, the first US President. However, this origin is also claimed by the town of Washington near Newcastle upon Tyne, some 34 miles (55 km) north of Whashton.

The Hack & Spade public house was established by 1880.

== Farming ==
The village is surrounded by farmland and has two main farms the Hagg which is down a track away from the main village. The farm caters for pig farming with a residential property on site (part of the Hartforth estate) and another Whashton Farm set in the main village catering for cows.

== Village ==
The village once had a pub 'The Hack and Spade', however that is now closed and the only village amenity is post box. There is also a classic red telephone box that has been converted to house a defibrillator.

== See also ==
- Listed buildings in Whashton
