= John Dakyn =

English cleric and historian

John Dakyn (1497 – November 9, 1558) was an English cleric and historian. He was Archdeacon of the East Riding of Yorkshire and a noted chronicler of the Pilgrimage of Grace.

In his early life Dakyn was chancellor to the Bishop of Bath and Wells, William Knight, and in his will Knight appointed Dakyn his executor. Much of the money that established the Dakyn Trust in the parish of Kirkby Ravensworth was left by Knight. Dakyn was also vicar general to Knight whilst Knight was the absentee holder of the archdeaconry of Richmond. Dakyn played a leading part in the Pilgrimage of Grace. He rose to vicar general of the diocese of York and archdeacon of the East Riding of Yorkshire in 1551. In 1554 he was appointed rector of Kirkby Ravensworth. He gained the degree of Doctor of Canon Law (DCL).

In 1556 he established a school and an almshouse for the people of the parish of Kirkby Ravensworth where he had been rector. Initially the endowment of the school and almshouse was in lands, situated principally in the parish of East Coulton. The school and the almshouse have since been closed down, but the John Dakyn Trust continues to benefit local young people and the elderly.

Dakyn was responsible for the North of England's first, and possibly only, burning for heresy in the last three years of Mary's reign. According to John Foxe: "Immediately after D. Dakins geuing sentence that þe other should be burnt, came home to hys house and neuer ioyed after, but dyed."
