= Easby =

Easby may refer to:

== Places in England ==
- Easby, Hambleton, North Yorkshire
  - Easby Moor
- Easby, Richmondshire, North Yorkshire
  - Easby Abbey
  - Easby Hall

== People ==
- George Meade Easby (1918–2005), American actor and producer
- Joseph Easby (1867–1915), English cricketer

== Other ==
- Easby Cross, an Anglo-Saxon standing cross held by the Victoria and Albert Museum
