= Abbey Mills =

Abbey Mills or Abbey Mill may refer to:

- Abbey Mill, Reading, a ruined former watermill in Reading, Berkshire
- Abbey Mill, West Ham, an ancient tidal watermill in London
- Abbey Mills Pumping Stations in Abbey Lane, London
- Abbey Mills Mosque, a proposed mosque that was to have been built in London
- Easby Abbey Mill, a former watermill in North Yorkshire
- Fountains Mill, also known as "Abbey Mill", a watermill in North Yorkshire
- Merton Abbey Mills, a former textile factory in London

== See also ==
- Abby Mills: List of Harper's Island characters
- Abbie Mills: List of Sleepy Hollow characters
