= Listed buildings in Easby, Richmondshire =

Easby is a civil parish in the county of North Yorkshire, England. It contains 24 listed buildings that are recorded in the National Heritage List for England. Of these, three are listed at Grade I, the highest of the three grades, one is at Grade II*, the middle grade, and the others are at Grade II, the lowest grade. The most important building in the parish is Easby Abbey, now a ruin, which is listed together with associated structures. The other listed buildings include a church, monuments in the churchyard and its gateway, houses and associated structures, farmhouses and farm buildings, a row of former almshouses, a former watermill, a boundary stone and a milepost.

== Key ==
Grade	Criteria
I	Buildings of exceptional interest, sometimes considered to be internationally important
II*	Particularly important buildings of more than special interest
II	Buildings of national importance and special interest

== Buildings ==
Name and location	Photograph	Date	Notes	Grade
St Agatha's Church; 54.39764°N 1.71584°W		12th century	The church has been altered and extended through the centuries, including a restoration in 1869 by George Gilbert Scott. It is built in stone, and has roofs of lead, stone slate and artificial slate. The church consists of a nave with a west bellcote, a south aisle, a south porch, a north transept and a chancel. At the west end, pilaster buttresses flank a lancet window with a hood mould, and the bellcote above has two lights. The porch is gabled, and has two storeys, and a buttress on the left. It contains a double-chamfered doorway with a pointed arch and a hood mould, and above it is a trefoil-headed niche. Inside, there is a barrel vault, a doorway with a pointed arch in the east wall, two openings in the west wall, and a doorway in the north wall with a chamfered surround, shafts, and a hood mould.	I
Easby Abbey ruins 54.39813°N 1.71686°W		Late 12th century	The abbey was extended until 1536, when it was repressed, and has since become a ruin. The remains are in sandstone, and consist of parts of the abbey church, the cloister, sacristies, the chapter house, the refectory, the dorter, the guests' solar and the reredorter to the south, and the infirmary and abbot's accommodation to the north.	I
Abbey Gatehouse; 54.39764°N 1.71514°W		Early 14th century	The gatehouse is in sandstone, with two storeys and three bays, and is without a roof. The northeast front has pilaster buttresses on splayed chamfered plinths, and it contains a semicircular arch with a chamfered surround within a pointed arch. Above is a floor band, and a two-light pointed window with Y-tracery.	I
Abbey House; 54.39681°N 1.71609°W	—	14th century	Originally a monastic barn, later partly converted into a house, and now a ruin. It is in sandstone with a stone slate roof, two storeys and eight bays. The barn part contains a segmental-arched opening with an inscribed keystone, lancet windows and a pitching door. The house has a central doorway with dog-tooth decoration on the jambs and a shouldered head, and four-pane windows.	II
Low Wathcote; 54.40852°N 1.70681°W	—	Late 16th to early 17th century (probable)	A stone farmhouse with quoins, and a stone slate roof with stone copings. There are two storeys and an attic, and a later two-storey rear extension on the left. The windows have chamfered surrounds, and most are sashes. At the rear is a doorway with a three-light fanlight.	II
Easby Mullions; 54.39893°N 1.71320°W		Late 17th century or earlier	Two houses combined into one, in stone, with quoins, gutter brackets moulded as corbels, and an artificial slate roof. There are two storeys and four bays. The doorway has a chamfered surround, and the windows are mullioned.	II
East house, St Trinian's Farm; 54.40444°N 1.70205°W	—	Early 18th century (probable)	A farmhouse in stone, with quoins, and a stone slate roof with raised verges. There are two storeys and attics, two bays, and a rear outshut. In the centre is a doorway with a quoined surround, and the windows are sashes with quoined surrounds and flat arches.	II
Easby Hall and 1 and 2 Easby Court; 54.39835°N 1.71335°W		c. 1730	A country house, later divided, in stone and brick, with roofs of lead and Westmorland slate, consisting of a main block with three storeys and five bays, and two-storey two-bay flanking wings. The central block has chamfered rusticated quoins, a cornice and a parapet. In the centre is a porch with Roman Doric columns and engaged pilasters, and a door with a segmental fanlight. The windows are sashes in architraves with tripartite keystones. The north wing extends to a kitchen courtyard range, and beyond to a stable courtyard, all converted into cottages.	II*
Almshouses; 54.39910°N 1.71333°W		1732	A row of four almshouses, altered in 1816, and later converted into one house. The building is in stone on a chamfered plinth, with chamfered rusticated quoins a moulded cornice, and a stone slate roof with stone copings and shaped kneelers. There is a single storey and four bays. The doorways have stone surrounds, and the windows have two lights and flat-faced mullions. In the centre is a panel in an architrave, with an inscription and the date.	II
Monument to Margaret Carter; 54.39743°N 1.71561°W	—	c. 1735	The monument is in the churchyard of St Agatha's Church to the south of the priest's door, and is a chest tomb in sandstone. It has corner balusters flanking carved panels, and on each side are carvings of cherubs. On the north side there is also an inscription and a portrait, the south side has crossbones, and on the west end are a skull, a torch and a candle.	II
St Trinian's Hall; 54.40015°N 1.70518°W		Early to mid 18th century	The house, which was later extended, is in sandstone with red tile roof. The house has two storeys and an L-shaped plan, with a main range of five bays, flanking two-bay wings, and a later rear wing on the right. The south front has a plinth, chamfered rusticated quoins, a cornice, and a parapet with ball finials on pedestals. In the centre is a Doric portico with three-quarter columns and a pediment. This is flanked by canted bay windows, and in the upper floor are sash windows in architraves.	II
High Wathcote; 54.41273°N 1.70798°W	—	Mid 18th century	A rendered farmhouse, later a private house, with a main block of two storeys and three bays, and a single-storey single-bay wing to the left. The main block has a pantile roof with stone coping, a central gabled porch with a figure on the apex, and sash windows. At the rear is a round-arched stair window. The wing has a stone slate roof, a band and a sash window.	II
Monument to Robert Carter; 54.39742°N 1.71560°W	—	c. 1761	The monument is in the churchyard of St Agatha's Church to the south of the priest's door, and is a chest tomb in sandstone. There is an inscription on the lid, panelled sides, and corner pilasters with gadrooning on the bases.	II
Monument to Thomas Wilkin; 54.39743°N 1.71568°W	—	c. 1763	The monument is in the churchyard of St Agatha's Church to the south of the south aisle, and is a chest tomb in sandstone. There is an inscription on the lid, on the north and south sides are panels with carvings of angel's heads with large wings, and on the north end are a skull and crossbones.	II
Walls northeast of St Trinian's Hall; 54.40093°N 1.70480°W	—	Mid to late 18th century	The walls of the former kitchen garden are in brick, with stone backing and coping. They are about 4 metres (13 ft) high and have 15 bays divided by shallow pilaster buttresses. The west wall contains a gateway and is partly rendered.	II
Gateway to St Trinian's Hall; 54.40009°N 1.70587°W	—	Second half of the 18th century (probable)	Flanking the entrance to the drive are stone gate piers, with a quadrilobate plan and in Gothick style. They have moulded bases and pointed caps, and the gates are in wrought iron.	II
Abbey Mill; 54.39822°N 1.71810°W		Late 18th to early 19th century	A corn watermill and miller's house on earlier foundations, later converted into a private house. It is in stone, with quoins, and a stone slate roof with stone gable copings and shaped kneelers. There are two storeys and six bays. On the front is a doorway with a stone surround on plinths, with imposts, voussoirs, a semicircular arch and a tripartite keystone. The windows are sashes.	II
Boundary stone 54.40351°N 1.71977°W		Late 18th to early 19th century	The boundary stone is in sandstone, about 300 millimetres (12 in) high and 400 millimetres (16 in) wide, and it has a four-centred arched top. The stone is inscribed "EASBY ROAD ENDS HERE".	II
Sandford House; 54.40378°N 1.71899°W	—	Early 19th century	A house, extended in 1868, and later divided into two. The extension became the main block and the older part at the rear, the service range. The house is in stone on a plinth, with a felt roof and two storeys. The front range has five bays, corner pilasters, and an entablature with a frieze, a cornice and a blocking course. In the centre is a Doric portico and a doorway with a fanlight, to its left is a square bay window, and the other windows are sashes in architraves.	II
Broken Brea Crossing Cottage; 54.39787°N 1.68988°W		c. 1846	A railway crossing keeper's cottage built by the Great North of England Railway, later a private house, it is in sandstone, with a stepped diagonal buttress, and a Welsh slate roof, with gables, decorative bargeboards and finials. There are two storeys and an L-shaped plan, with a front range of one bay and a rear wing. The doorway has a hood mould, the windows are casements with two shouldered lights, and the openings are under pointed relieving arches.	II
The Vicarage; 54.39935°N 1.71632°W	—	c. 1868	The vicarage is in stone with a Welsh slate roof, Dutch gables and moulded kneelers. There are two storeys and an L-shaped plan, and it has a main range with a double depth plan and three bays, and a lower service range to the right. The entrance front has quoins, a central doorway with Tuscan pilaster capitals, and a moulded round arch with a keystone. This is surrounded by paired Tuscan pilasters, a Doric frieze and a cornice. Above it is a mullioned and transomed window and a pedimented gable with ball finials.	II
Coach-house and wall northwest of The Vicarage; 54.39951°N 1.71642°W	—	c. 1868	The coach house is in stone with quoins and a Welsh slate roof. There is one storey and a loft and one bay. It contains a garage door in a coach opening, a stable door with a quoined surround, and a two-light mullioned window. In the loft is a pitching door with a quoined surround, and at the rear is a Venetian window under a Dutch gable with a weathervane. To the right is a screen wall with stepped coping, containing a doorway in an architrave on rusticated plinths, with interrupted jambs, a fanlight, imposts, and a round arch with a rusticated keystone.	II
Gateway to Church of St Agatha; 54.39777°N 1.71515°W		c. 1869	The gateway at the entrance to the churchyard is in stone, and contains a double-chamfered pointed arch with continuous moulding on chamfered plinths. It is flanked by pilaster buttresses, coped at the top, over which is the main coped gable with lateral gablets.	II
Milepost; 54.41093°N 1.71195°W		Late 19th century	The milepost on the north side of Darlington Road (A6108 road) is in cast iron. It has a triangular plan and a sloping top. On each face and on the top is inscribed "RICHMOND" and initials.	II
