= Easby Hall, Richmond =

Grade II* listed house in North Yorkshire, England

Coordinates: 54.3983°N 1.7133°W

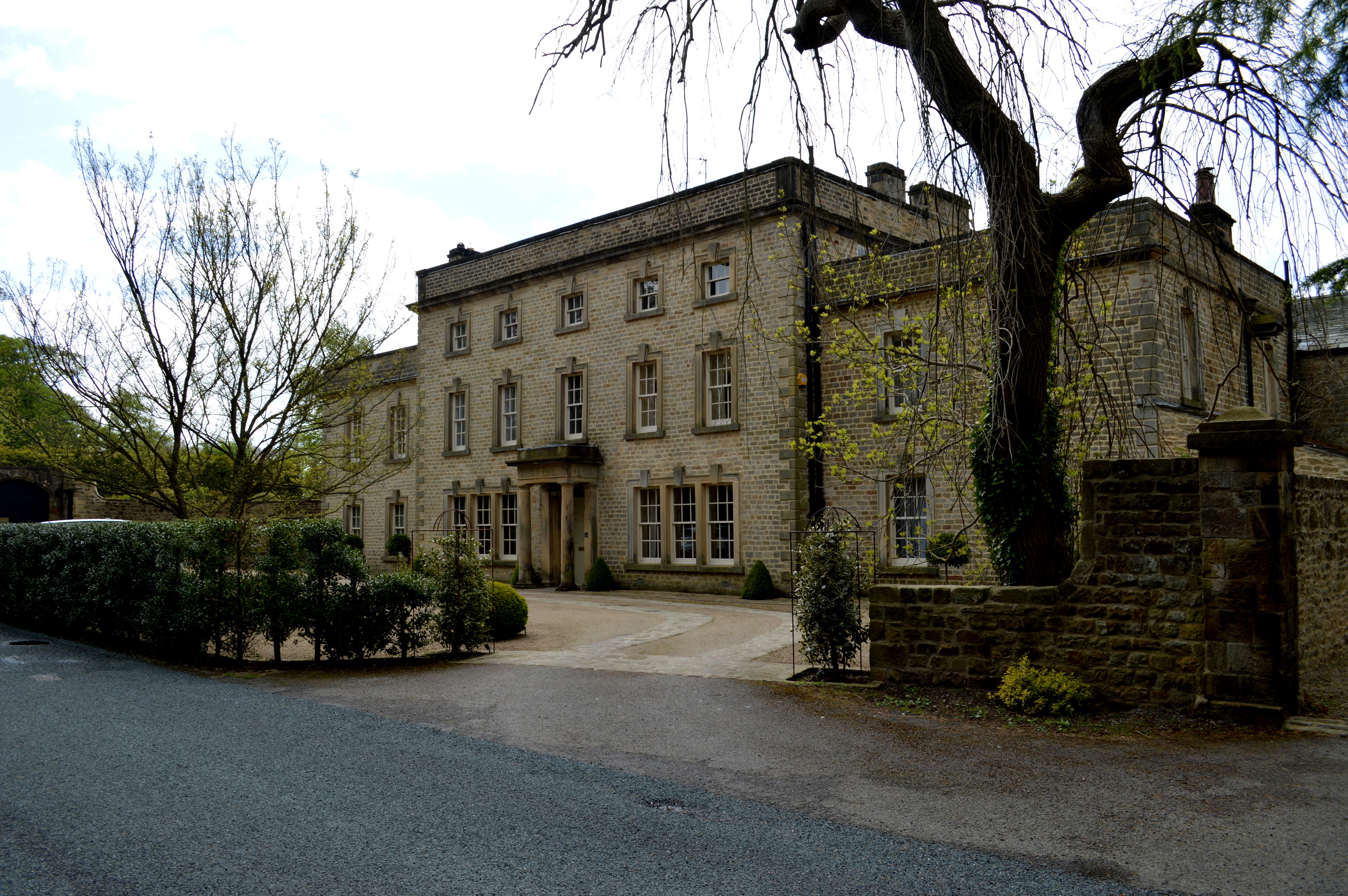
Easby Hall

Easby Hall near Richmond in North Yorkshire, England is a building of historical significance and is listed on the English Heritage Register. Built in 1729 by the Reverend William Smith, Easby Hall became the home of many notable people for the next two and a half centuries. It now provides bed and breakfast accommodation and is a venue for special events.

== Early history ==
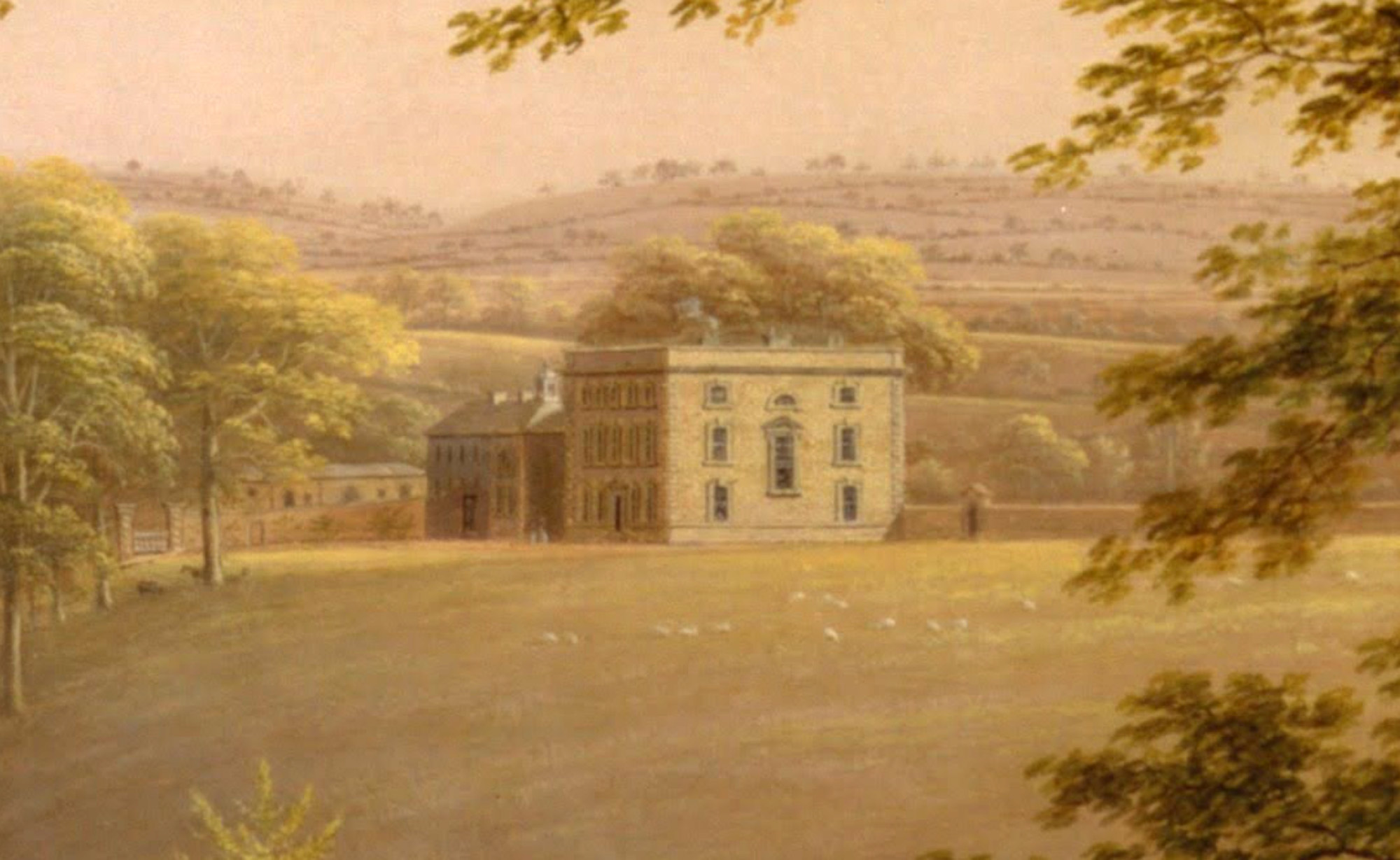
Easby Hall 1800. Extract from the painting of Easby Abbey by George Cuitt

Reverend William Smith (c. 1653–1735) built the Hall in 1729 shortly after he bought the Easby Estate. He was the son of Dr. William Smith who lived in the village of Easby. His mother was Anne Layton and his uncle was Henry Layton, a philosopher and theological writer.

William was educated at the local grammar school in Richmond and then went to the University of Oxford to obtain his degree. He was an antiquarian and obtained a Fellowship at Oxford where he remained for the next twelve years. In 1704, he became the Rector of Melsonby and retained this job until his death in 1735. He continued his writing while he was at Melsonby, and in 1727 at the age of 77 he wrote an 8 volume publication entitled The Annals of University College.

In 1705, he married Mary who was the widow of Gerard Langbaine, a famous biographer. The couple had no children, so when he died in 1735 he left Easby Hall to his nephew who was also called William Smith. However, because of financial difficulties, William sold the estate to his brother Thomas Smith, who was an attorney. When he died in 1775, he left the property to his natural son who sold it in 1786 to Robert Knowsley of Wighill Park. Two years later, in 1788, Robert sold the estate to Cuthbert Johnson of London. When he died in 1790, he passed it to his second son also called Cuthbert Johnson. He rented the house to wealthy tenants for many years, and then in 1815 he advertised the whole estate for sale. The advertisement is shown. The house was described in the following terms.

"The mansion is suited to the accommodation of a family of distinction. Stone built and brick fronted with an entire substantial leaded roof. It consists of an entrance hall, dining and drawing rooms, library and breakfast parlour, four best bed rooms with dressing closets and sleeping rooms and servant’s apartments. The domestic offices are housekeepers room, storeroom, butlers panty, plate closet, kitchen, larder, brew house, laundry and servants hall."

In about 1800 George Cuitt (1743–1818), a notable artist, painted Easby Abbey showing Easby Hall on the right. The picture above is an extract from this painting.

The house was bought in 1816 by Robert Jaques and was owned by this family until 1955.

== The Jaques family ==
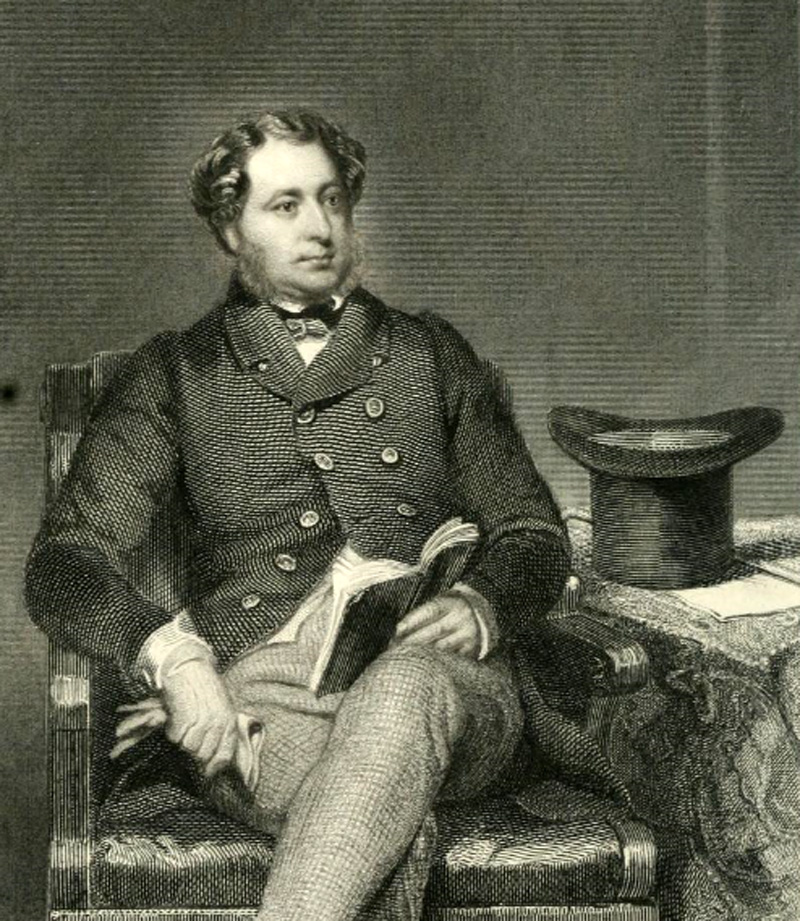
Richard Machel Jaques 1846

Robert Jaques (1769–1842) was a gentleman and a breeder of race horses. After he bought the Easby Estate in 1816, he turned the property into a breeding stud. His son wrote a book on the history of the stud in 1860, and outlines the many famous racing horses that his father owned. Robert was born in 1769 in Bedale, Yorkshire. He and his brother became merchants in London and both acquired considerable fortunes. In 1808, he married Sarah Whittaker and the couple had two sons and one daughter. Unfortunately, she died in 1814. Shortly after he married Mary Lunn and the couple had a daughter Sarah who was born in 1816 in Easby Hall. When he died in 1842 his eldest son Richard Machel Jaques inherited the property.

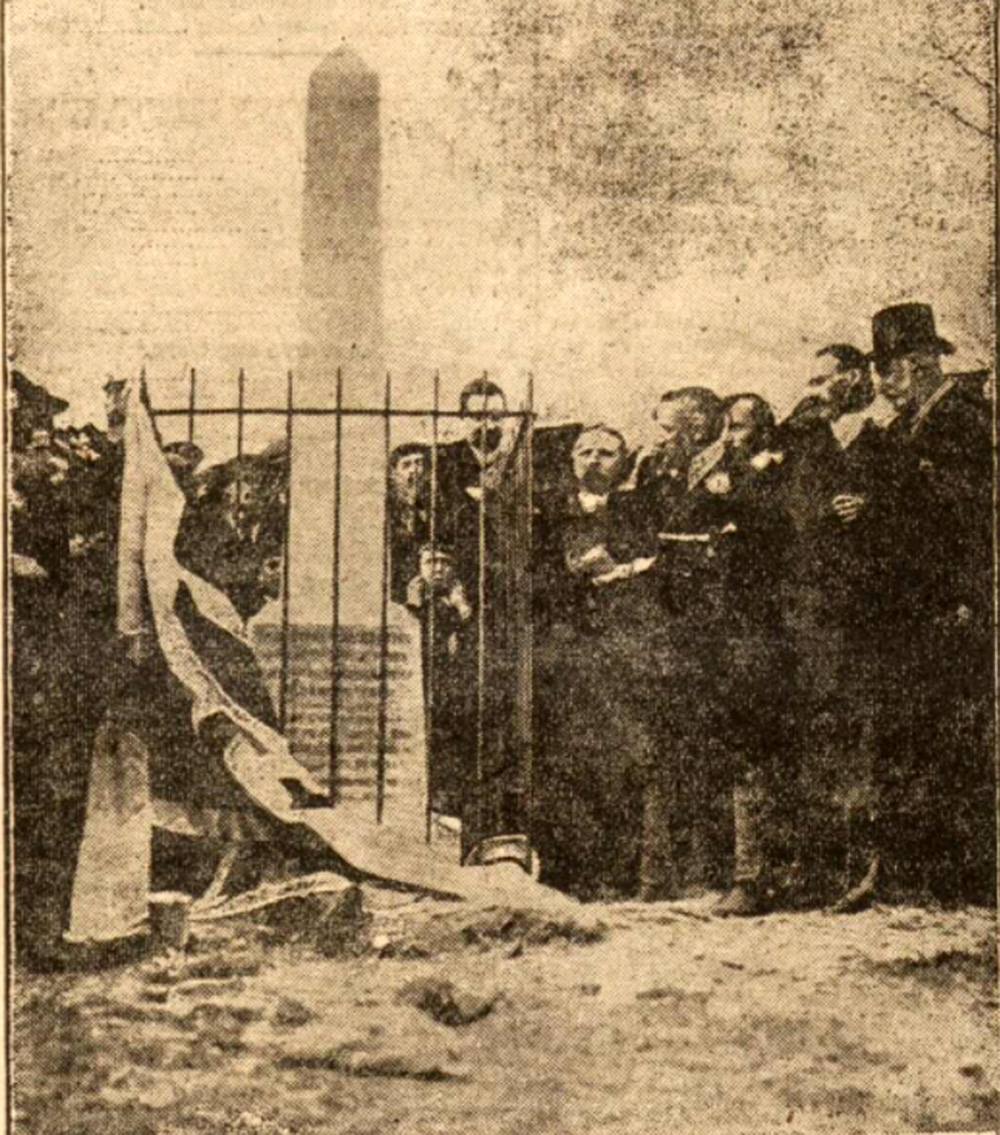
Leonard Jaques (extreme right) at the unveiling of the Willances Memorial in 1906

Richard Machel Jaques (1809–1889) was born in 1809. He was educated at the University of Cambridge. In 1836, he married Frances Hickes who was the daughter and heiress of Fowler Hickes of Silton Hall. For several years before he inherited Easby Hall, he lived at St. Trinians Hall, which is nearby. The couple had seven children – four sons and three daughters. He continued running the Easby Estate as a race horse stud for some time and then later became prominent as a breeder of shorthorn cattle and Berkshire pigs. For while, he undertook some mining ventures but this was not a success. Richard died in 1889, and in his obituary he was described as "a country gentleman of the old school, and a fine specimen of the Yorkshire squire. He was universally popular in the North-Riding, being a true sportsman, a considerate landlord, a kind neighbour, an excellent judge of livestock, and a first-rate farmer". He was succeeded by his eldest son Leonard Jaques.

Leonard Jaques (1839–1916) was born in 1839 in Easby. In 1864, he married Agatha Eliza Boddam, daughter of Colonel Alexander Boddam-Whetham of Kirklington Hall. The couple bought Wentbridge House near Pontefract and had two sons there. Agatha died in 1882. In 1885, Leonard married Mary Clara Partridge (1848–1932) who was the daughter and sole heiress of Rev. William Edwards Partridge owner of Horsenden House. When her father died in 1886, Mary inherited the Horsenden Estate and this property then came into the Jaques family. Leonard inherited Easby Hall when his father died in 1889, and in 1900 added the south wing which still bears his initials.

Leonard died in 1916, and his son Robert Harold Whetham Jaques (1875–1953) inherited the Hall. In 1918, he married Bertha Hibbert (1891–1923) however she died in 1923 in Monte Carlo when they were on a touring holiday. He died in 1953 and the estate was sold in 1955.

== See also ==
- Grade II* listed buildings in North Yorkshire (district)
- Listed buildings in Easby, Richmondshire
