= Margaret Longhurst =

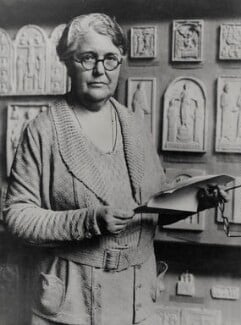
- in 1938
- Born: 5 August 1882; Chertsey
- Died: 26 January 1958 (aged 75); Aldbourne
- Education: informal
- Occupation: keeper
- Employer(s): V&A
- Known for: expert on ivories and medieval sculpture

Margaret Longhurst (5 August 1882 – 26 January 1958) was a British museum curator. She was an expert in Italian sculpture and ivories at the Victoria and Albert Museum (V&A). She was the first woman to be a keeper in a major British museum.

== Life ==
Longhurst was born in Chertsey in 1882. Her parents were Caroline Louisa (born Taylor) and William Longhurst. Her father was a successful draper and she was given a private informal education. When her father died in 1895 he left over £40,000 and her inheritance could have funded the substantial European travel she undertook. She devoted her time to learn about medieval sculpture and she used her scholarship to write articles for the Burlington Magazine. In 1926, 27 and 1929 she published her work on ivories: English Ivories in 1926, Catalogue of Carvings in Ivory part one in 1927 and the second part in 1929. Three years later she published the two volume Catalogue of Italian Sculpture which she had co-written with Eric Maclagan.

In 1931 the V&A purchased part of the Easby Cross and Longhurst published a description of this important sculpture in the journal Archaeologia which was published by the Society of Antiquaries. (Longhurst had become a fellow of the Society of Antiquaries two years before).

In 1941 she was on the council of the Society of Antiquaries having become a keeper at the V&A in 1938. She was the first woman to hold this position in major British museum. She had worked all her career in the department of architecture and sculpture until she retired on 27 August 1942.

== Death and legacy ==
Longhurst died in her "Wayside" home in Castle Street in Aldbourne. She was remembered as a private, stern and pleasant character in the village. She features in that village's heritage centre.
