= St Agatha's Church, Easby =

Anglican church in North Yorkshire, England

Coordinates: 54.3976°N 1.7158°W

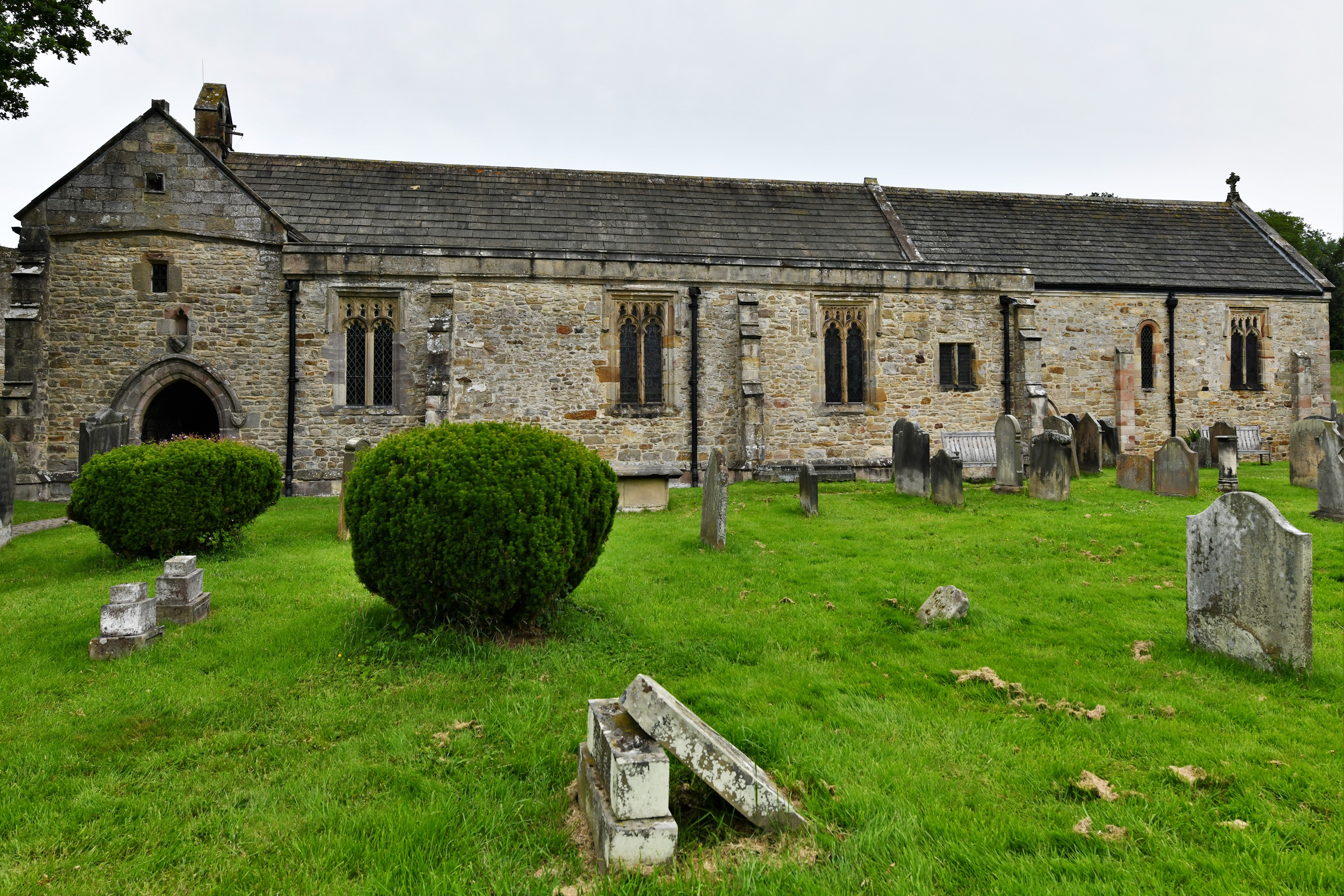
The church, in 2019

St Agatha's Church is the parish church of Easby, a village near Richmond, North Yorkshire, in England.

The church lies immediately south of Easby Abbey. It was probably built in the 1150s, from which period the west end of the nave and south side of the chancel survive. The south side of the nave dates from about 1200, including a contemporary doorway, while the north wall of the chancel and east window are from later in the 13th century. A north transept was added in the early 14th century, and a south aisle and porch in the late 14th century. It was restored by George Gilbert Scott in 1869, and was Grade I listed in 1969.

The church is part of the parish of Easby, Skeeby, Brompton on Swale, and Bolton on Swale; part of the Richmond Deanery in the Anglican Diocese of Leeds.

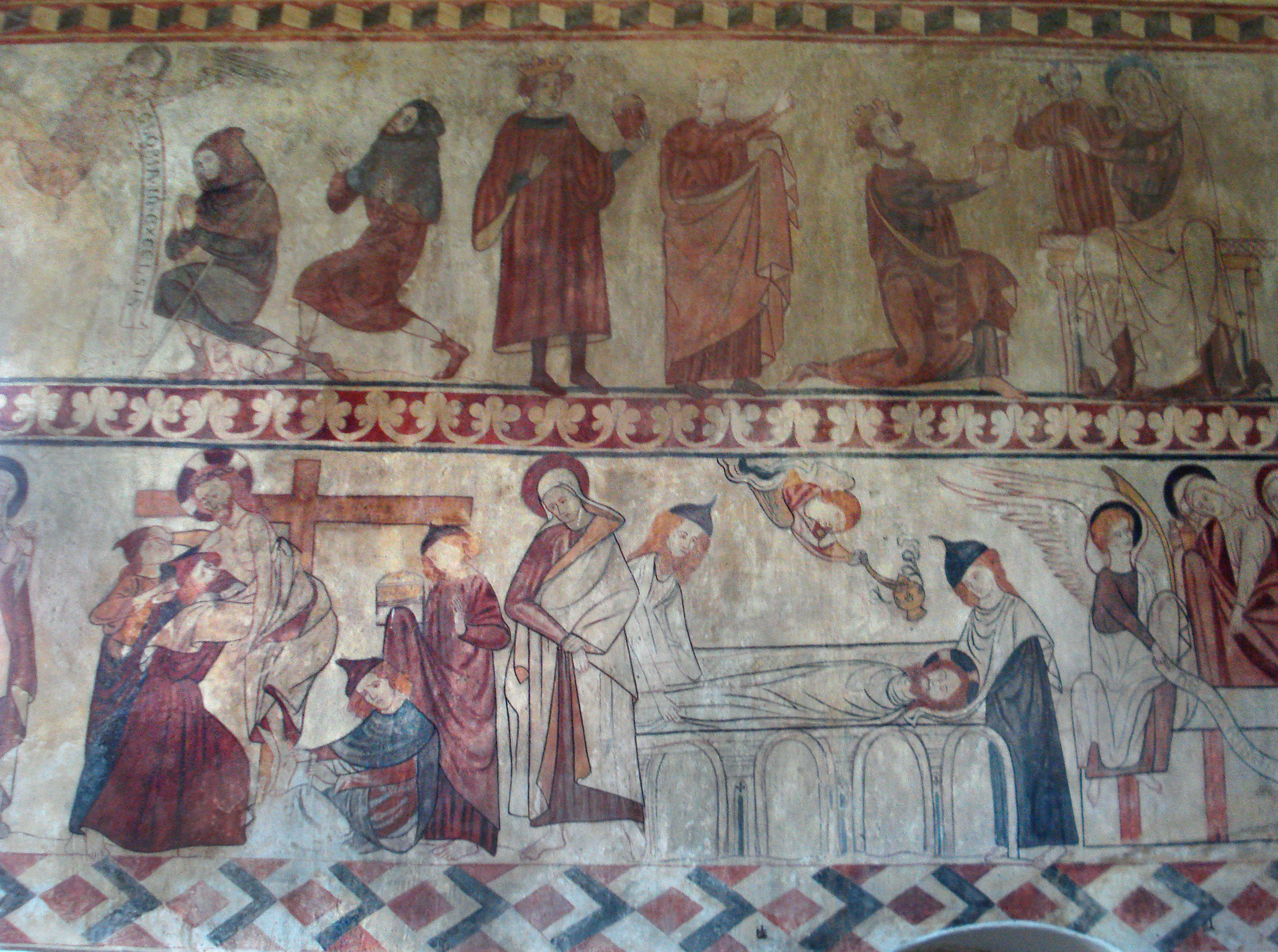
One of the frescoes

The church is built of stone, and has roofs of lead, stone slate and artificial slate. It consists of a nave with a west bellcote, a south aisle, a south porch, a north transept and a chancel. At the west end, pilaster buttresses flank a lancet window with a hood mould, and the bellcote above has two lights. The porch is gabled, and has two storeys, and a buttress on the left. It contains a double-chamfered doorway with a pointed arch and a hood mould, and above it is a trefoil-headed niche. Inside, there is a barrel vault, a doorway with a pointed arch in the east wall, two openings in the west wall, and a doorway in the north wall with a chamfered surround, shafts, and a hood mould.

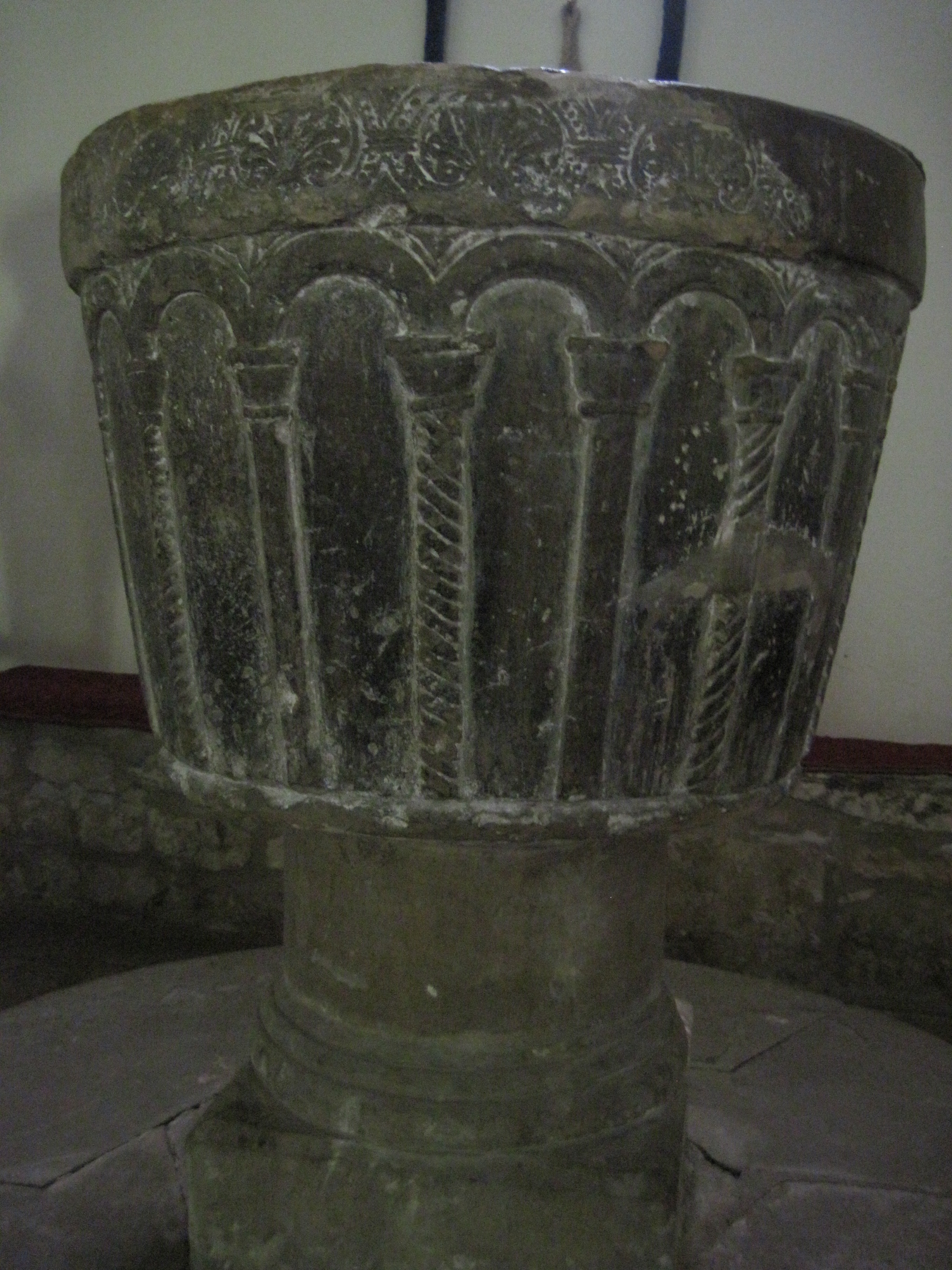
The font

The door to the church may be 14th century. The font is 12th century, with a later stem. The south chapel has Perpendicular wooden screens, and a brass monument to Eleanor Bowes, dating from 1623. The chancel has a piscina and sedilia, and a stone coffin with no lid. The east window includes two pieces of 12th century stained glass, depicting Saint John and a Premonstratensian canon, and a 15th-century section depicting an angel. There is also a plaster replica of the carved stone Easby Cross, which was extracted from the wall of the church and reassembled in the 20th century, and is now in the Victoria and Albert Museum.

The church is best known for its 13th century wall paintings, which were rediscovered during the 19th century restoration, and restored by Burlinson and Grylls. Those on the north side of the nave depict characters sowing, digging, pruning and hawking; along with scenes from the Garden of Eden. On the south side are scenes from the Nativity and Passion of Jesus.

== See also ==
- Grade I listed buildings in North Yorkshire (district)
- Listed buildings in Easby, Richmondshire
