= Easby Abbey Mill =

Mill in Easby, North Yorkshire, England

Coordinates: 54°23′53″N 1°43′05″W

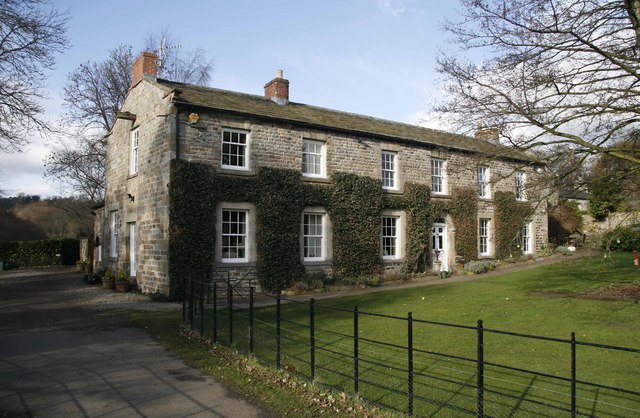
The building, in 2011

Easby Abbey Mill is a historic building in Easby, a village near Richmond, North Yorkshire, in England.

Easby Abbey had a watermill constructed in the mid-12th century, on a site northwest of the abbey buildings. It had a mill race linked to the River Swale. Rebuilt around 1800, the mill retained the original foundations, and included a residence for the miller. In the 20th century, its purpose shifted from grinding corn to generating electricity for the village, via a turbine which operated until the 1950s. Later, it was converted into a dwelling.

The mill is constructed from stone, featuring quoins, a stone slate roof, stone gable copings and shaped kneelers. It boasts two storeys and six bays. The front facade includes a doorway with a stone surround on plinths, adorned with imposts, voussoirs, a semicircular arch, and a tripartite keystone. The windows are sashes. The mill has held grade II listed status since 1986.

== See also ==
- Listed buildings in Easby, Richmondshire
