= Eric Maclagan =

British museum director and art historian

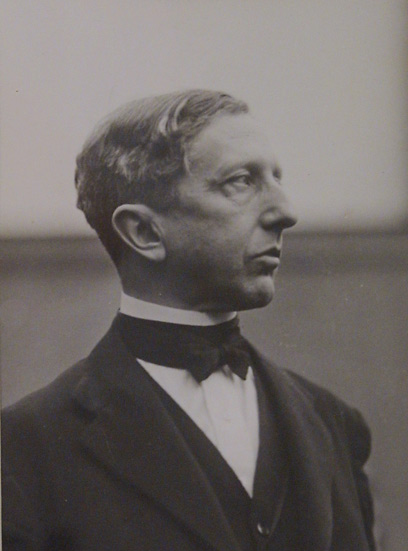
Eric Maclagan

Sir Eric Robert Dalrymple Maclagan KCVO CBE FSA (4 December 1879 – 14 September 1951) was a British museum director and art historian.

== Early years ==
Born on 4 December 1879 in London, Maclagan was the only son of William Dalrymple Maclagan, Archbishop of York and his second wife Augusta Anne, daughter of the sixth Lord Barrington. He had a sister and two half-brothers. Educated at Winchester College, he read classics at Christ Church, Oxford, graduating in 1902.

== Career ==
In 1905 Maclagan joined the staff at the Victoria and Albert Museum as an assistant in the Textiles Department. During his time there he produced a Guide to English Ecclesiastical Embroideries. After a time he transferred to the Department of Architecture and Sculpture where he worked under Mr A B Skinner. He became head of this department when Skinner died in 1908. One of his first tasks was to rearrange the collection of Italian sculpture and start the large Catalogue of Italian Plaquettes, which was published many years later in 1924.

=== France ===
In 1916 Maclagan was temporarily transferred to the Foreign Office, and later to the Ministry of Information. He became head of the Ministry's bureau in Paris and its controller for France in 1918. In 1919 he was attached to the British peace delegation and was present at the signing of the Treaty of Versailles. For his services in France, Maclagan was made a CBE in 1919. While in Paris, he was a member of the "set" surrounding the novelist Edith Wharton.

=== Director of the Victoria and Albert Museum ===
After his time in France, Maclagan returned to the Victoria and Albert Museum; and on the retirement of Sir Cecil Harcourt Smith in 1924 was appointed Director and Secretary. During his twenty one years in office the museum increased its reputation as a centre for research and learning. He produced the Catalogue of Italian Sculpture in collaboration with Margaret Longhurst of the Sculpture Department. Longhurst would, in time, be the V&A's first woman keeper. As Director he also worked towards broadening the museum's public appeal, for example by selling picture post-cards and Christmas cards of objects, issuing a series of sixpenny picture books (including his own, Children in Sculpture and Portrait Busts), and organising free public lectures. He introduced the "Object of the Week" scheme, under which a different object from the museum's collection, with a descriptive label, was placed in the entrance hall every Monday. He also wanted to rearrange the displays according to primary and secondary collections, but this proved impossible in the financial climate of the 1930s, and was not realised until Sir Leigh Aston reassembled the collections in 1945.

While at the museum, Maclagan wrote many scholarly articles and catalogues; and also an essay on The Bayeux Tapestry, published (as a King Penguin) in 1943, which became a minor bestseller.

During his time as Director he was personally responsible for a number of important public exhibitions. Among the most outstanding were the exhibitions of the works of art belonging to the livery companies of the City of London (1926), of English Medieval Art (1930), the William Morris Centenary exhibition (1934), the exhibition of the Eumorfopoulos collection (1936), and an exhibition of sculptures which had been moved from Westminster Abbey during the Second World War (1945).

=== Other offices ===
Maclagan was knighted in 1933, and in 1945 he was appointed KCVO. He held important appointments both at home and abroad. In 1927–8 he was Charles Eliot Norton professor at Harvard University. He was a Fellow of the Society of Antiquaries, acting as vice-president from 1932 to 1936, president of the Museums Association from 1935 to 1936, and chairman of the National Buildings Record. He was also appointed to lectureships at Edinburgh, Belfast, Dublin and Hull and was given honorary degrees at Birmingham and Oxford. As chairman for the fine arts committee of the British Council from 1941, Maclagan organised many exhibitions sent abroad by the council after the war. He was a gifted lecturer, proficient in French and German.

Maclagan was a keen churchman and took a prominent part in the affairs of the Anglo-Catholic movement. He performed much public service on behalf of the church through the Cathedrals Advisory Council and the Central Council for the Care of Churches, which for some time was housed in the Victoria and Albert Museum.

== Other interests ==
Despite being a specialist in the field of early Christian and Italian Renaissance art, Maclagan also admired many modern artists. In his personal collection he had a bust of himself made by Ivan Meštrović and was one of the first private collectors to buy the work of Henry Moore, he also unveiled the painting of the crucifixion by Graham Sutherland in St Matthew's Church, Northampton.

Maclagan had a profound interest in literature and poetry. He made several translations of the works of French poets, especially Arthur Rimbaud and Paul Valéry and published a volume of poems, Leaves in the Road in 1901 whilst an undergraduate. He designed several bookplates including one for his friend Bernard Berenson.

== Personal life ==
In 1913 Maclagan married Helen Elizabeth, daughter of the Commander the Hon. Frederick Lascelles, second son of the 4th Earl of Harewood. They had two sons: the elder, Michael became a distinguished historian, antiquary and herald; the younger, Gerald, was killed in action serving with the Rhodesian Air Force in 1942.

Maclagan died on 14 September 1951 while travelling in Spain.
