= Easby Cross =

Anglo-Saxon standing cross in the Victoria and Albert Museum

Coordinates: 54°23′52″N 1°43′01″W

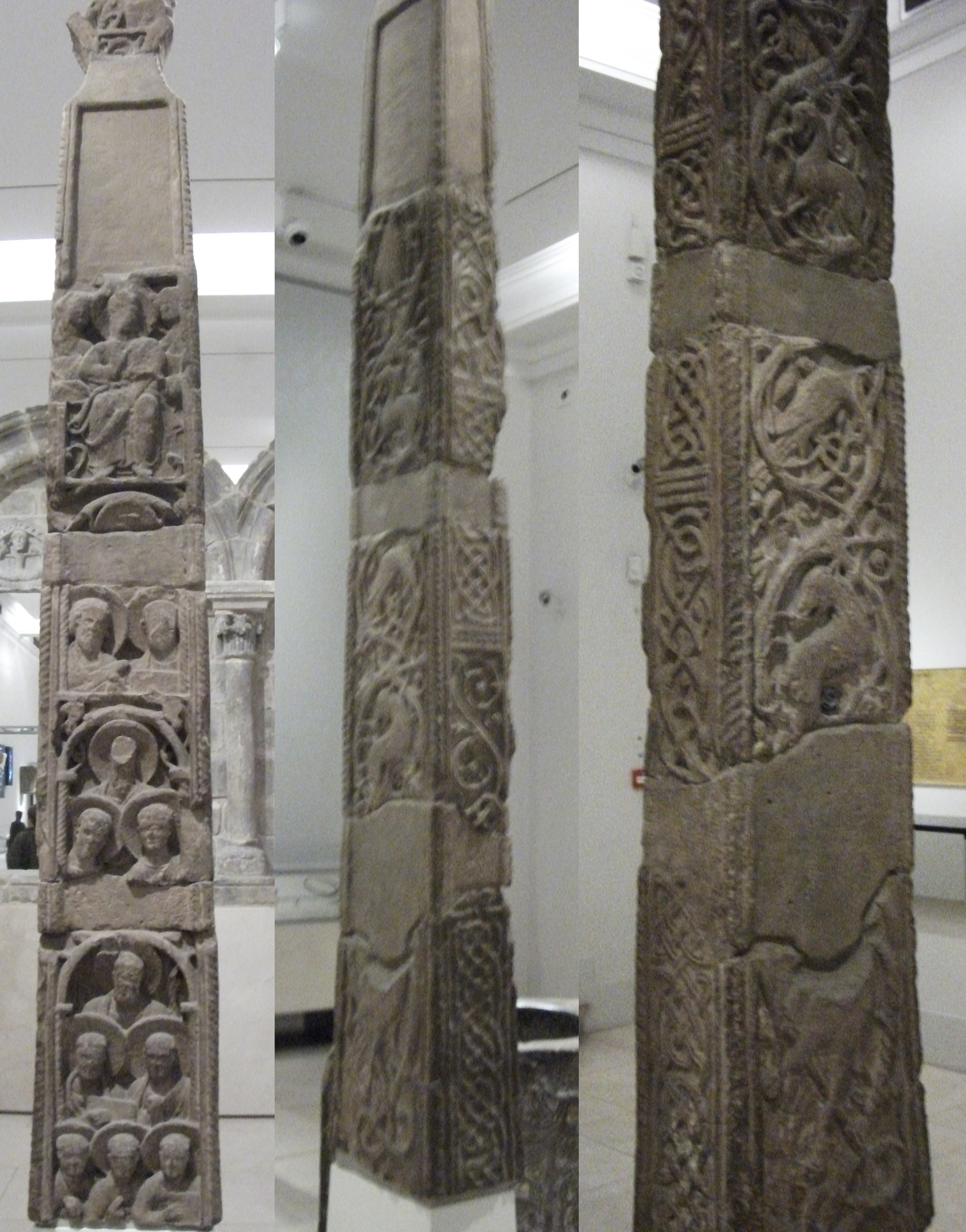
Three views of the cross

The Easby Cross is an Anglo-Saxon sandstone standing cross from 800–820, now in the Victoria and Albert Museum, London. It originally came from Easby near Richmond in the Richmondshire district of North Yorkshire, where a plaster replica is kept in the church. Easby was then in the Kingdom of Northumbria. The width of the long faces at the bottom of the lowest fragment is 31 cm (12 in), with a depth of 18 cm (7.1 in), and the whole cross would originally have been up to 3 metres (9.8 ft) high.

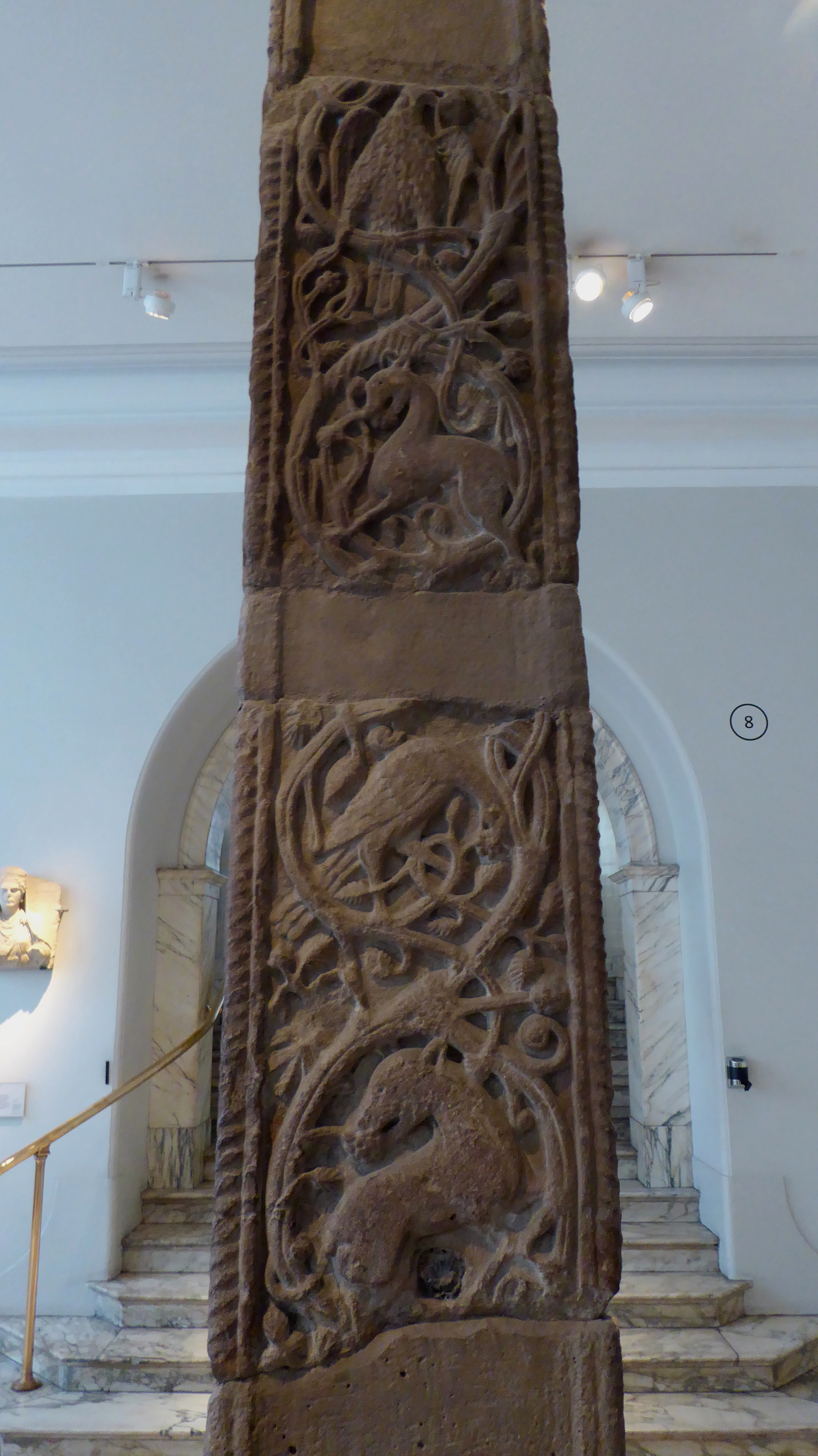
Vine-scroll "inhabited" with birds and animals.

Four fragments of the cross survive, which have been fitted into a reconstruction in the museum. Three of these were used, probably in the late 12th century, in the rebuilding of St Agatha's Church, Easby, from where they were recovered in the 20th century. All had one face visible in the wall surface; two were on exterior faces of the church, and one on the interior. The fragment with Christ in Majesty on the main face was recovered from a field wall nearby before 1869, and kept by the landowner until sold to the V&A in 1931. An article about the cross was published by the V&A's Margaret Longhurst the same year in Archaeologia.

Both types of reuse are very typical of the fate of broken crosses. Some of the sections show that repairs had already been made with molten lead before the cross was broken up, so it may have been unstable or otherwise damaged. Unusually for Anglo-Saxon crosses, the stone is not local: "the medium-grained deltaic sandstone matches stone traditionally produced in the Aislaby quarries of Eskdale near Whitby", which are nearly 60 miles away. This quarry had been used for the 7th-century Whitby Abbey and other sculptures in Yorkshire; the stone sections could have been transported by pack horse, perhaps most likely after carving, when they would weigh less.

The front face is carved with figurative reliefs. Those that survive show Christ in Majesty with two angels, and below that panel the halo of a figure now lost. Below the Christ panel there were three pyramidal groups of haloed head and shoulder reliefs of apostles in arched compartments. There were two groups of three and one of six, but the face of the topmost figure is now missing, and a modern filler section has been inserted. The cross head is missing its arms, which extended to about 90 cm across. The front face shows a bust of Christ blessing and holding a book, and the rear another Christ in Majesty. The style of the figures has been related to contemporary continental Carolingian art, "underlying the apparent naturalism, there is a carefully planned logic to the overlapping elements which is as rigidly defined as an interlace sequence". The layout and appearance of the apostle's heads has also been compared to a Byzantine row of heads around an archivolt from a church in Constantinople of the 6th–7th centuries.

The rear face contains a continuous vine scroll "inhabited" with beasts, an early appearance of this motif in Anglo-Saxon art. The scroll is the type known as "medallion scroll". Ernst Kitzinger thought the form of the scroll related to early Carolingian art, though it may have been derived more from Late Antique examples. The two much narrower side faces contain panels of interlace and vine scroll that alternate apparently rather randomly, as the two sides do not match. The corners have rope-work running the whole length of the faces, which the modern filler sections imitate.

The cross dates from the period when Alcuin of York and other Anglo-Saxons held important positions in the court of Charlemagne, and remained in contact with the Northumbrian monasteries. It is one of the finest surviving Anglo-Saxon crosses, and the best of a group of Northumbrian crosses including those from Otley, with similar busts of apostles or saints in arched compartments (but singly), Rothbury, Ilkley and Lowther. It has similarities to the earlier Ruthwell Cross and Bewcastle Cross, from western Northumbria, which are larger and have more ambitious decorative programmes, but also mix interlace with inhabited vine-scrolls. With an approximate date of 800–820, the cross was erected just as the golden age of Northumbrian art was coming to an end with the devastating Viking raids which began with the attack on Lindisfarne in 793.

The cross is now displayed at the start of the recently re-arranged Medieval galleries (in at the front door, right down stairs).

== See also ==
- Easby Abbey, founded 1152, now in North Yorkshire
