= St Trinian's Hall =

Building in Easby, North Yorkshire, England

Coordinates: 54°24′01″N 1°42′18″W

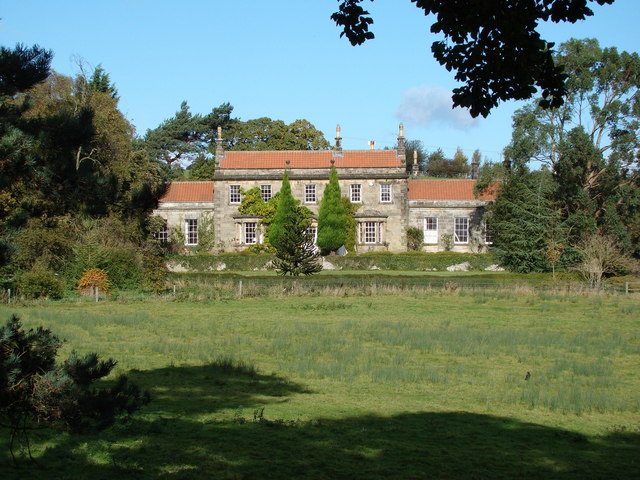
The building, in 2011

St Trinian's Hall is a historic building in Easby, a village near Richmond, North Yorkshire, in England.

In the mediaeval period, there was a monastic grange on the site, associated with Easby Abbey. The name "St Trinian" was associated with it by the Dissolution of the Monasteries in the 1530s, believed to be a reference to Saint Ninian. The current building dates from the early to mid 18th century, with wings added before 1785. The building was altered in 1906, and during the First World War, it was purchased by Everard Radcliffe, who lived there until his death in 1969. A local story claims that Radcliffe planted a copse of willows on the property, in order that they could be used in the manufacture of cricket bats for Yorkshire County Cricket Club.

The building was grade II listed in 1969. In 2022, it was put up for sale, with a guide price of £2.5 million. At the time, the property included a reception hall, dining room, drawing room, sitting room, library, hobby room, kitchen, utility room and two cloakrooms on the ground floor, with six bedrooms, four bathrooms and a further sitting room on the upper floors. There was a cottage at the rear, and about 20 acres of gardens and parkland.

The house is built of sandstone, with a red tile roof. It has two storeys and an L-shaped plan, with a main range of five bays, flanking two-bay wings, and a later rear wing on the right. The south front has a plinth, chamfered rusticated quoins, a cornice, and a parapet with ball finials on pedestals. In the centre is a Doric portico with three-quarter columns and a pediment. This is flanked by canted bay windows, and in the upper floor are sash windows in architraves. Inside, there is an early-18th century stone fireplace, and an early staircase in the rear wing.

== See also ==
- Listed buildings in Easby, Richmondshire
