= Easby Hospital =

Almshouse in Easby, North Yorkshire, England

Coordinates: 54°23′57″N 1°42′48″W

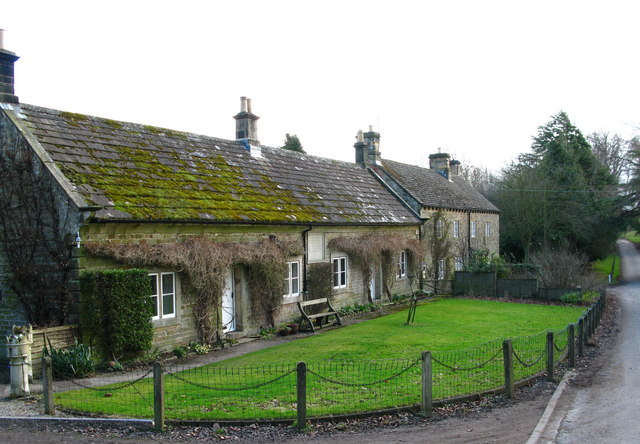
The building, in 2009

Easby Hospital is a historic building in Easby, Richmondshire, a village near Richmond, North Yorkshire, in England.

The almshouse was founded in 1732 by the Reverend William Smith, with an endowment of £12. It housed four poor people, and in Smith's instructions to his heirs, he ordered that two of the rooms should in future be used to house a schoolteacher. In 1818, the building was modified to house only two people. In the 20th century, it was converted into a single house. The building was grade II listed in 1969.

The building is in stone on a chamfered plinth, with chamfered rusticated quoins a moulded cornice, and a stone slate roof with stone copings and shaped kneelers. There is a single storey and four bays. The doorways have stone surrounds, and the windows have two lights and flat-faced mullions. In the centre is a panel in an architrave, with an inscription and the date.

== See also ==
- Listed buildings in Easby, Richmondshire
