= Joseph Easby =

English cricketer

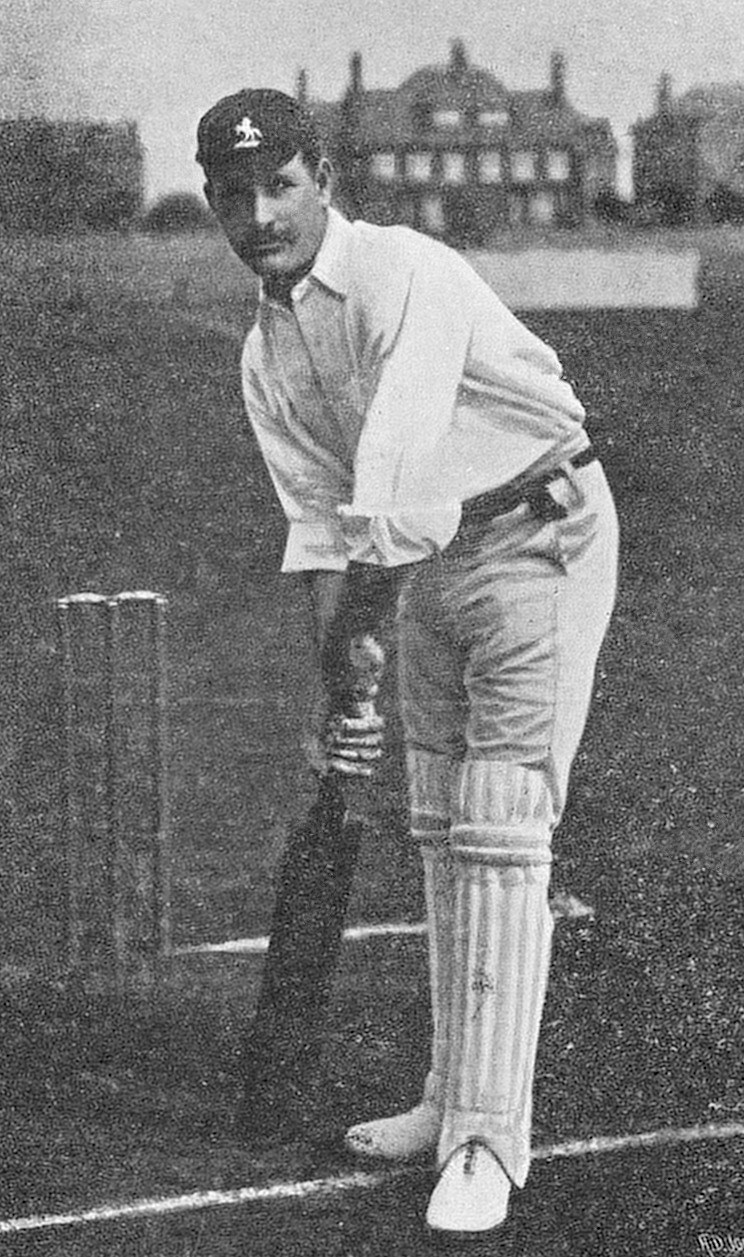
- Easby pictured during the 1890s

Personal information
- Full name: Joseph William Easby
- Born: 12 August 1867; Appleton Wiske, Yorkshire
- Died: 7 February 1915 (aged 47); Dover, Kent
- Batting: Right-handed
- Bowling: Right-arm medium

Domestic team information
- Years: Team
- 1890: Hampshire
- 1894–1899: Kent

Career statistics
Competition	First-class
Matches	62
Runs scored	1,851
Batting average	18.32
100s/50s	0/8
Top score	73
Balls bowled	792
Wickets	13
Bowling average	32.61
5 wickets in innings	0
10 wickets in match	0
Best bowling	2/8
Catches/stumpings	26/3
- Source: CricInfo, 3 September 2012

Joseph William Easby (12 August 1867 – 7 February 1915) was an English professional cricketer who played first-class cricket at the end of the 19th century.

Easby was born at Appleton Wiske in Yorkshire in 1867. He joined the British Army and served in the King's Own York and Lancaster Regiment where, according to his Wisden obituary, he "learned his cricket" under the command of Leonard Hamilton. He played seven matches for Hampshire County Cricket Club in 1890 at a time when the county did not have first-class status.

Easby showed such promise as a cricketer that he was "persuaded to leave the Army" and took up the position of groundsman at the St Lawrence Ground in Canterbury in order that he could qualify to play county cricket for Kent. In local cricket he scored a century on the ground in his first appearance for St Lawrence Cricket Club in 1892 and made his Kent County Cricket Club first-class debut in 1895.

He went on to play 62 first-class matches for the county between 1895 and 1899. He was described as having "many strokes" and "was a fine field" who "could keep wicket well" but who did not fulfil his potential at first-class level. Easby died at Dover in Kent in February 1915 aged 47.

== Bibliography ==
- Carlaw, Derek (2020). Kent County Cricketers, A to Z: Part One (1806–1914) (PDF). Cardiff: ACS.
