= Easby, Richmondshire =

Hamlet and civil parish in North Yorkshire, England

Coordinates: 54°23′56″N 1°42′48″W

Easby
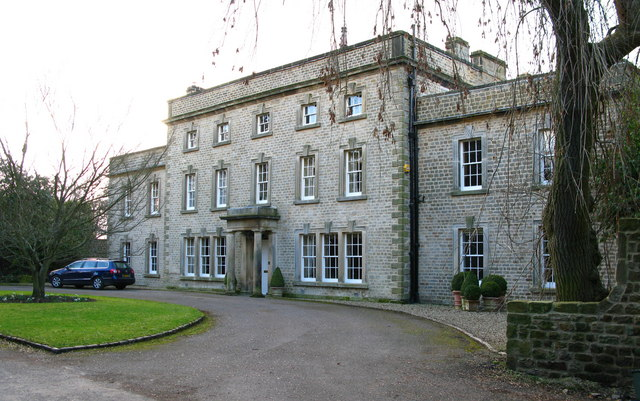
- Easby Hall

- Location within North Yorkshire
- Population: 197
- OS grid reference: NZ187004
- Unitary authority: North Yorkshire
- Ceremonial county: North Yorkshire
- Region: Yorkshire and the Humber
- Country: England
- Sovereign state: United Kingdom
- Post town: RICHMOND
- Postcode district: DL10
- Police: North Yorkshire
- Fire: North Yorkshire
- Ambulance: Yorkshire
- UK Parliament: Richmond and Northallerton

Easby is a hamlet and civil parish in the county of North Yorkshire, England. It is situated near Richmond on the banks of the River Swale, approximately 12 miles (19 km) north west from the county town of Northallerton. The population taken by ONS was less than 100. Population information is included in the parish of Hudswell.

== History ==
The hamlet is mentioned in the Domesday Book of 1086 as Asebi, whose lands belonged to Count Alan of Brittany. He had granted the lordship of the manor to Thor at the time of the Norman Conquest, but it had passed to Enisant Mussard, Constable of Richmond Castle, by 1086. There were seven households and five ploughlands at a taxable value of six geld units. The manor passed from Enisant to Roald de Richmond and then to descent of the lords of Constable Burton. The lands were held as demesne lordships by the Marmion and Fitz Hugh families into the 12th century, but eventually they were granted to the nearby Abbey who held them until the dissolution of the monasteries. The Crown then granted the manor in 1537 to John, Lord Scrope of Bolton. King Edward VI granted the manor to Edmund Boughtell upon his accession to the Crown, but this was reverted in 1557 to Ralph Gower. By 1579 though the manor was back in the possession of the Scrope family. It remained with them until sold to Bartholomew Burton in 1726 who also sold it onto the Rev William Smith of Melsonby who built Easby Hall. His heirs sold it to Robert Knowsley in 1786 who quickly sold it to Cuthbert Johnson. It eventually came into the possession of the Jaques family by 1816.

The etymology of the name is derived from an Old Norse personal name, Esi and the suffix -by to mean Esi's farm.

== Geography and governance ==
The hamlet is a collection of dispersed dwellings on the banks of the River Swale approximately 1 mile (1.6 km) south east of Richmond south of the B6271 road. The hamlet lies within the Richmond and Northallerton UK Parliament constituency. From 1974 to 2023 it was part of the district of Richmondshire, it is now administered by the unitary North Yorkshire Council.

== Demography ==
Population
| Year | 1801 | 1811 | 1821 | 1831 | 1841 | 1851 | 1881 | 1891 | 1901 | 1911 | 1921 | 1931 | 1951 | 1961 |
|---|---|---|---|---|---|---|---|---|---|---|---|---|---|---|
| Total | 693 | 722 | 765 | 822 | 771 | 863 | 123 | 147 | 114 | 122 | 89 | 119 | 126 | 112 |

The 2001 UK Census includes the parish of Easby into the larger area of Brompton-on-Swale. The 2011 Census showed the population as 197 for the Parish alone.

== Religion ==
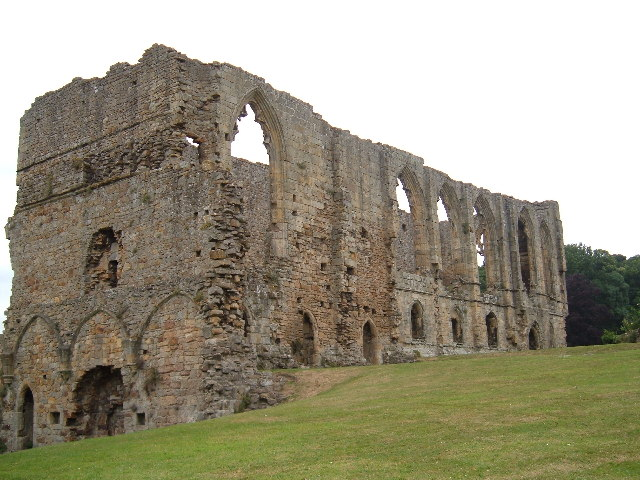
The ruins of Easby Abbey in 2005

St Agatha's Church, Easby was built at the beginning of the 12th century, and underwent restoration work in 1869. Like the Abbey ruins and the gatehouse, it is also a Grade I listed building.

== Notable buildings ==
Easby Abbey, which is in ruins, was one of many dissolved by King Henry VIII as part of the reformation. The important Anglo-Saxon stone Easby Cross of 800-820 is currently in the Victoria and Albert Museum in London, but the church, from whose walls three of the four fragments were recovered in 1931, displays a plaster cast. The ruins are a Grade I listed building as is the Abbey Gatehouse.

Other notable buildings include Easby Hospital, almshouses built in 1732; Easby Abbey Mill, built about 1800; and the 18th-century St Trinian's Hall.

== Notable residents ==
- Rev William Smith (c. 1653-1735), antiquarian and master of the jewel house in the reign of Charles I, was born in the hamlet. He was a graduate of University College, Oxford.
