= Leonard Hamilton (cricketer) =

Indian-born English Cricketer and British Army officer

Personal information
- Full name: Leonard Alison Hall Hamilton
- Born: 23 December 1862; Mount Aboo, Rajputana, British India
- Died: 14 March 1957 (aged 94); Umberleigh, Devon, England
- Batting: Right-handed
- Bowling: Right-arm medium
- Role: Batsman

Domestic team information
- Years: Team
- 1890–1892: Kent
- FC debut: 8 May 1890 Kent v MCC
- Last FC: 8 June 1893 MCC v Kent

Career statistics
Competition	First-class
Matches	21
Runs scored	645
Batting average	18.42
100s/50s	1/3
Top score	117*
Balls bowled	70
Wickets	2
Bowling average	25.00
5 wickets in innings	0
10 wickets in match	0
Best bowling	2/24
Catches/stumpings	7/–
- Source: CricInfo, 19 October 2017

Colonel Leonard Alison Hall Hamilton (23 December 1862 – 14 March 1957) was an Indian born British Army officer and an amateur first-class cricketer. He was born in 1862 at the Mount Aboo Hill Station in Rajputana in what was then British India, the second son of Colonel George Harrison.

Hamilton served in the King's Own Yorkshire Light Infantry for 30 years, retiring with the rank of colonel before the First World War. He played first-class cricket for Kent County Cricket Club. He died at Umberleigh in Devon in 1957 aged 94.

== Early life and military career ==
Hamilton was educated at Tonbridge School, where he played cricket and rugby union for the school first teams, from 1875 until leaving the sixth form in 1880. From there he went on to the Royal Military College, Sandhurst, graduating and being commissioned into the 1st Battalion the South Yorkshire Regiment, part of the King's Own Yorkshire Light Infantry (KOYLI), in March 1883. He served with the KOYLI throughout his career, taking part in the pacification of Burma following the Third Anglo-Burmese War from 1886 to 1887 and serving as a staff officer for six months at Bhamo in Burma before being promoted to captain in 1891. He attended the Staff College, Camberley, from 1895–1896 and served as an instructor at Sandhurst in 1897.

He was promoted to major in 1900 and lieutenant colonel in 1908, before retiring with the rank of colonel in 1912.

== Cricket career ==
Hamilton played some cricket for the Army, for Sandhurst and for United Services Portsmouth. In May 1890 while playing for the Army against the Navy he made 269 runs. While serving in India he played in regimental matches and twice exceeded 200 runs. He made his first-class cricket debut for Kent County Cricket Club in May 1890 against MCC at Lord's and played a total of 20 first-class matches for the county over the three seasons between 1890 and 1892. He won his county cap in 1890 and played mainly as a batsman, scoring a first-class century against the touring Australians in 1890. He made a final first-class appearance for MCC against Kent in June 1893, although he continued to play non-first-class cricket for teams such as MCC and Free Foresters.
