= Easby Abbey =

- Abbey of St Agatha
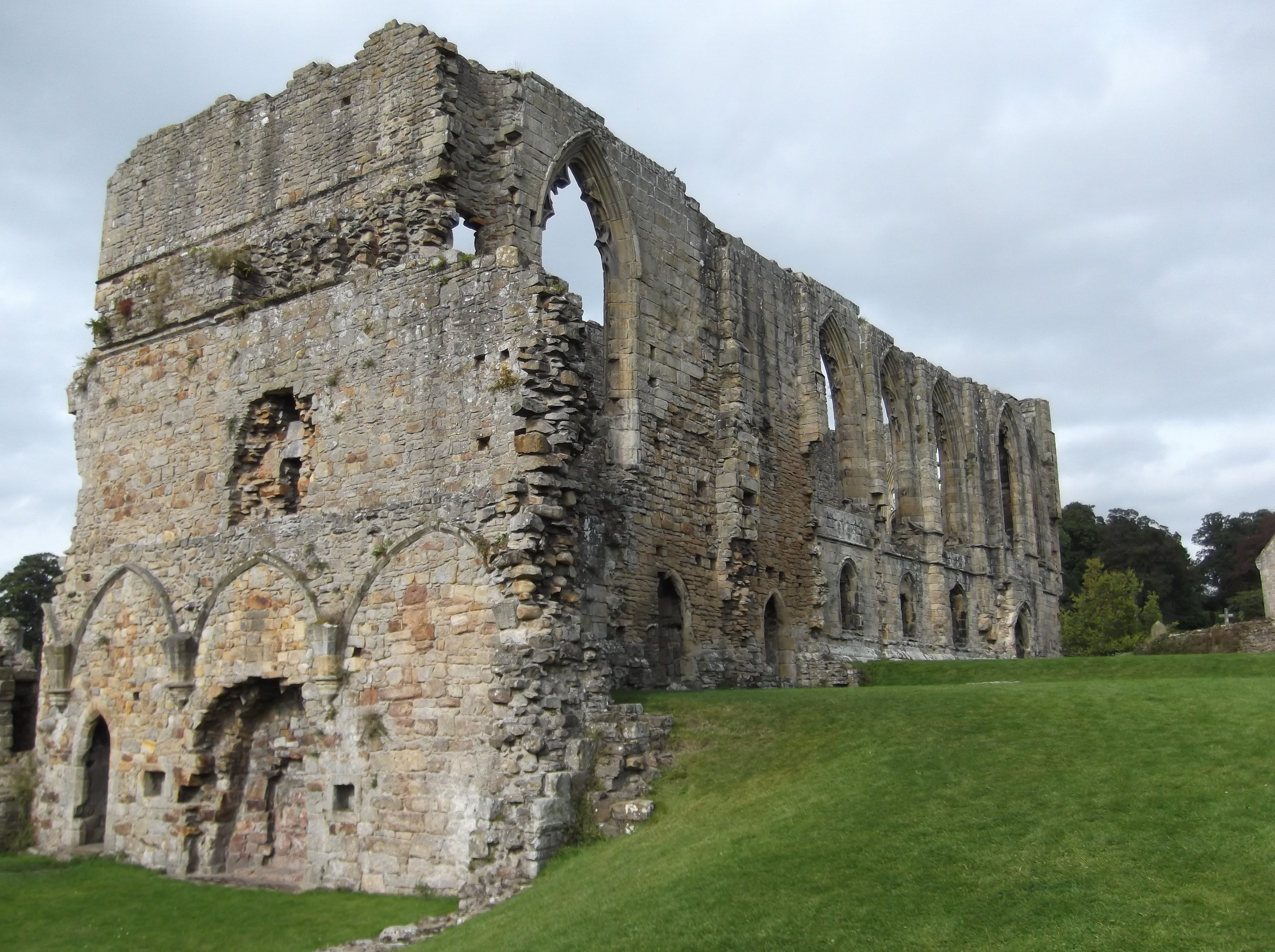
- Easby Abbey refectory
- Easby Abbey
- 54°23′52″N 1°43′01″W
- OS grid reference: NZ 18507 00307
- Location: Richmond, North Yorkshire
- Country: England
- Denomination: Premonstratensian
- Website: www.english-heritage.org.uk/visit/places/easby-abbey/

History
- Status: Ruin
- Founded: 1152
- Founder(s): Roald, Constable of Richmond Castle
- Dedication: St Agatha

Specifications
- Materials: Stone

Easby Abbey, or the Abbey of St Agatha, is a ruined Premonstratensian abbey on the eastern bank of the River Swale on the outskirts of Richmond in the county of North Yorkshire, England. The site is privately owned but maintained by English Heritage and can be reached by a riverside walk from Richmond Castle. Within the precinct is the still-active parish church, St Agatha's, displaying 13th-century wall paintings.

== History ==
The Abbey of St Agatha, Easby, was founded in 1152 by Roald, Constable of Richmond Castle. The inhabitants were canons rather than monks. The Premonstratensians wore a white habit and became known as the White Canons. Easby was a daughter house of the Abbey of St Mary and St Martial (Newsham Abbey) in Lincolnshire; it was the third Premonstratensian house founded in England.

The White Canons followed a code of austerity similar to that of Cistercian monks. Unlike monks of other orders, they were exempt from episcopal discipline. They undertook preaching and pastoral work in the region (such as distributing meat and drink). The canons also raised sheep.

Other former Premonstraterian houses in the north of England include Egglestone Abbey in County Durham and Shap Abbey in Cumbria. Like most northern monasteries, Easby suffered from frequent Scottish raids during the Middle Ages. Great damage was caused to Easby and Egglestone Abbey in 1346 when the English army was billeted there on its way to the Battle of Neville's Cross.

In the late 1530s Henry VIII dissolved the monasteries. The abbey was abandoned and left to fall into ruins, though some of the best features were salvaged: the fine canopied choir stalls are now found in Richmond parish church.

The ruins are now Grade I listed.

=== Picture gallery of Easby Abbey ===
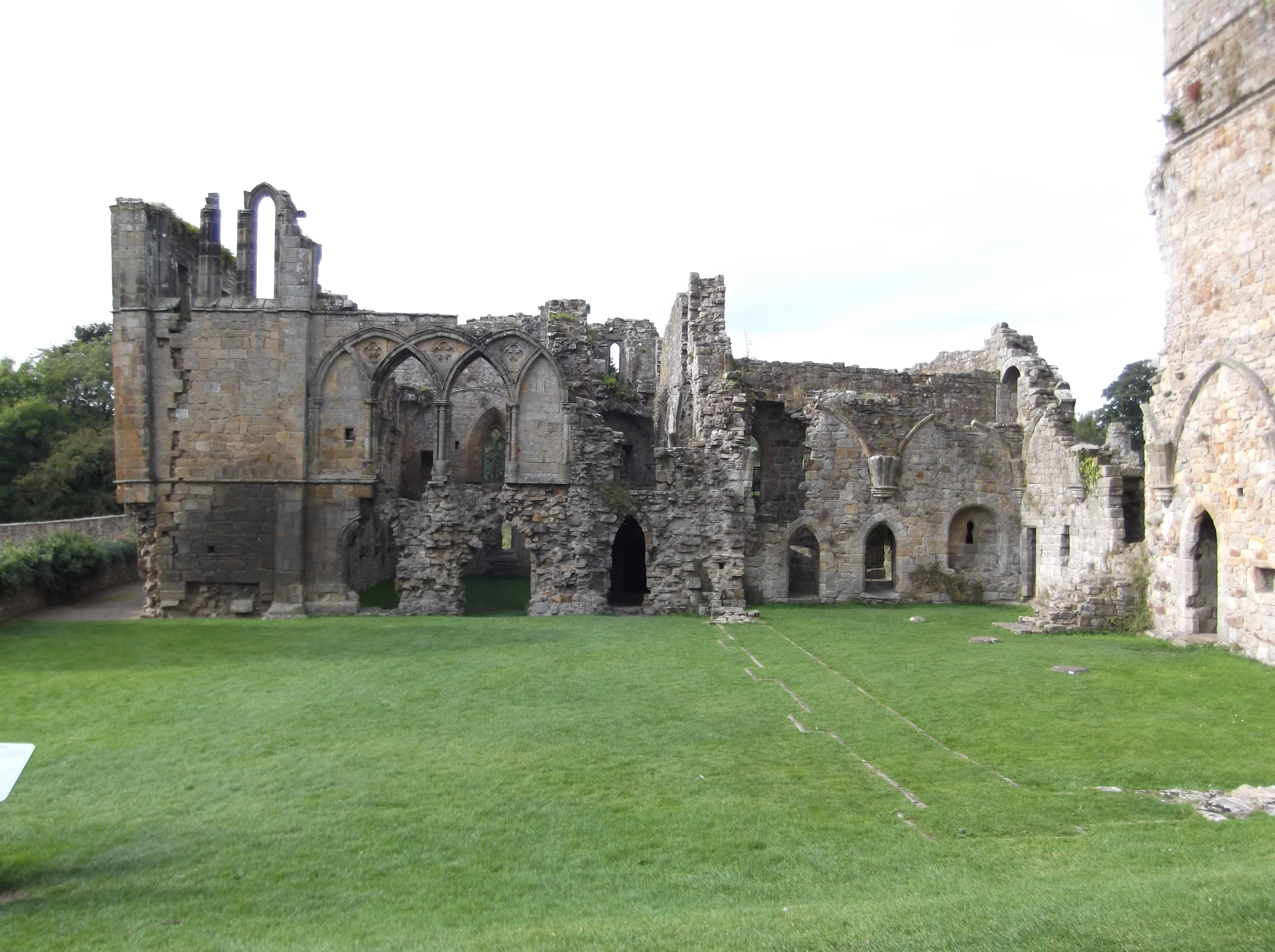
Easby Abbey claustral west range

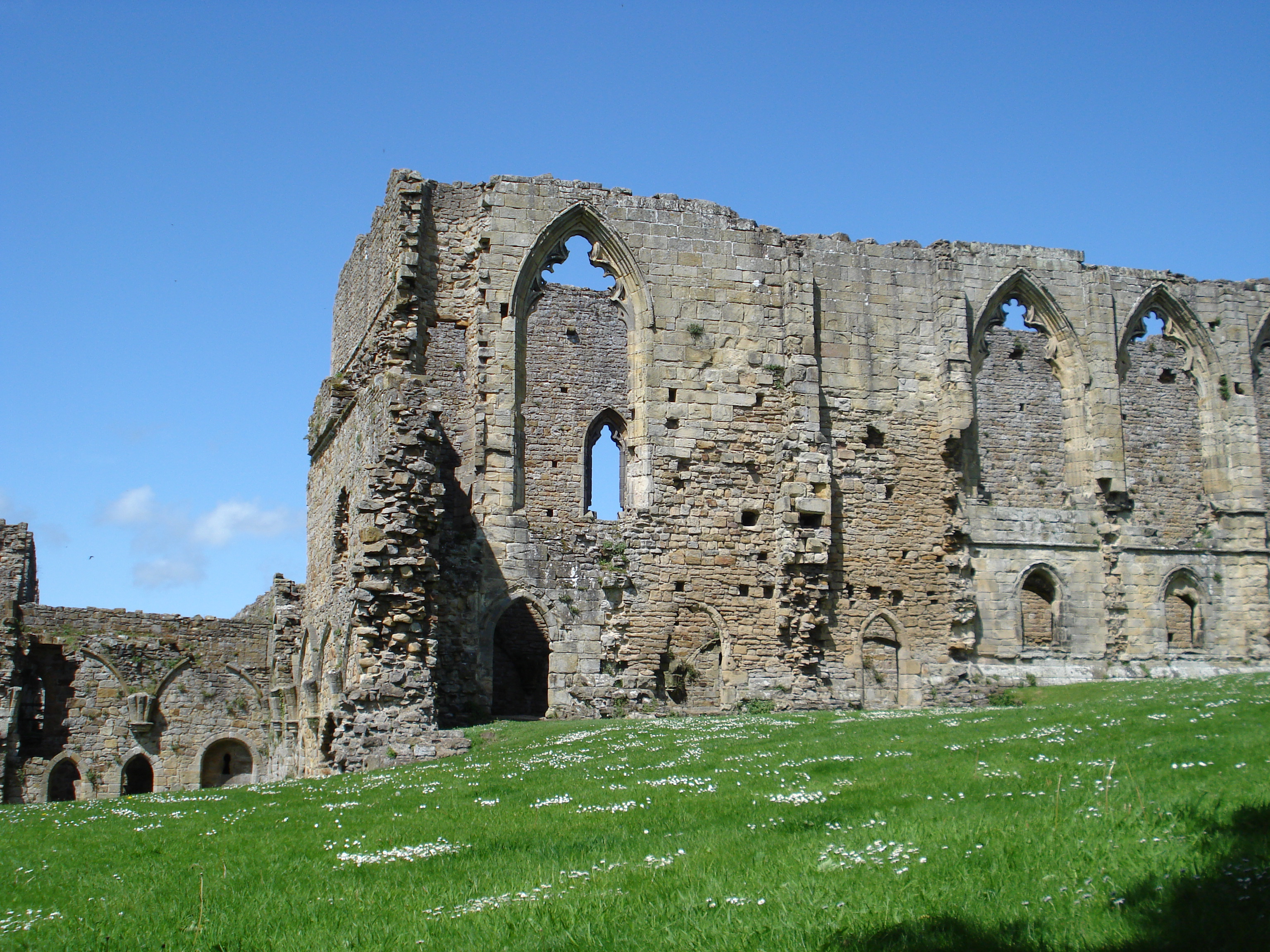
Easby Abbey, May 2007

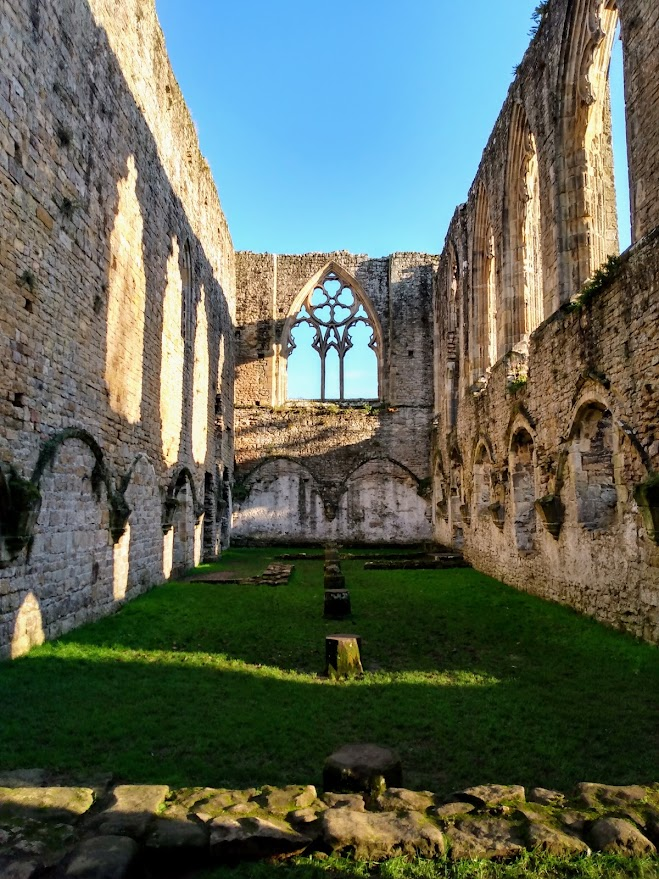
The interior of the refectory

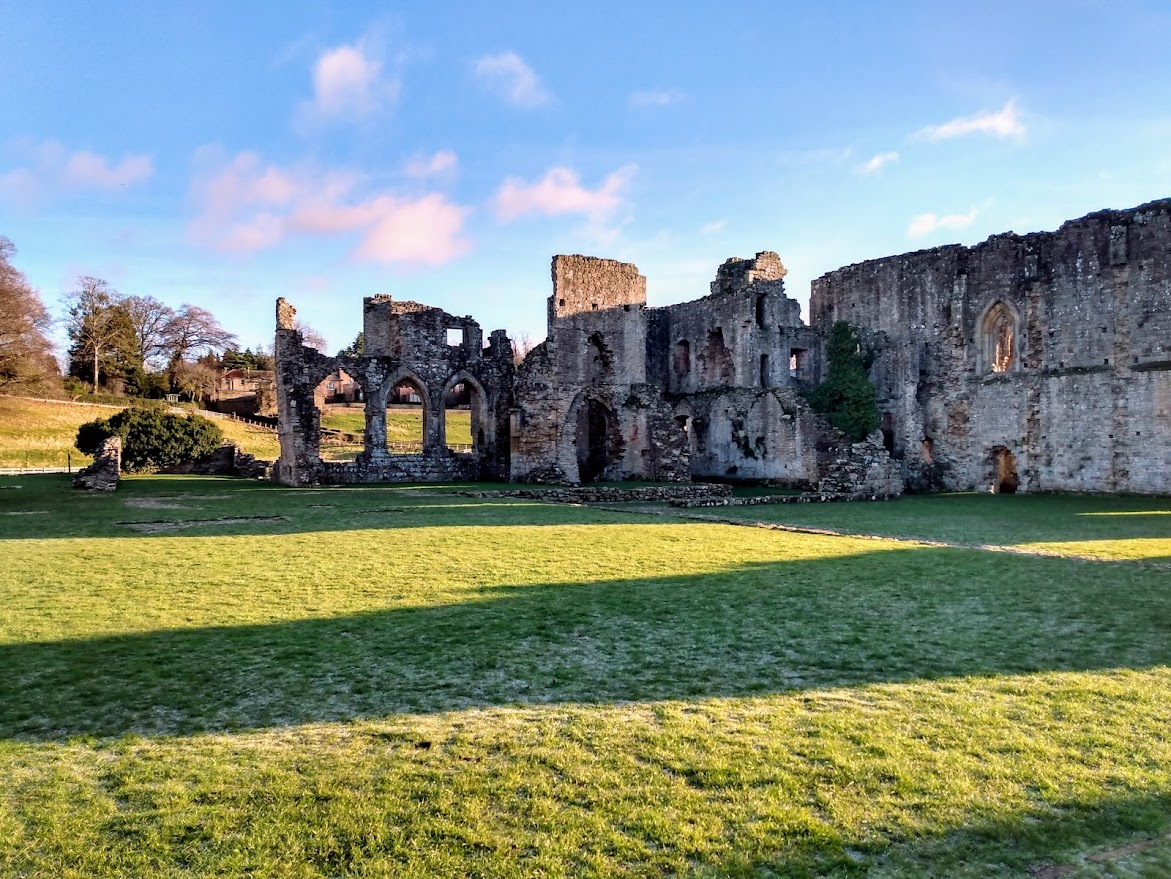
A view towards the chapter house ruins and refectory north wall from the cloister

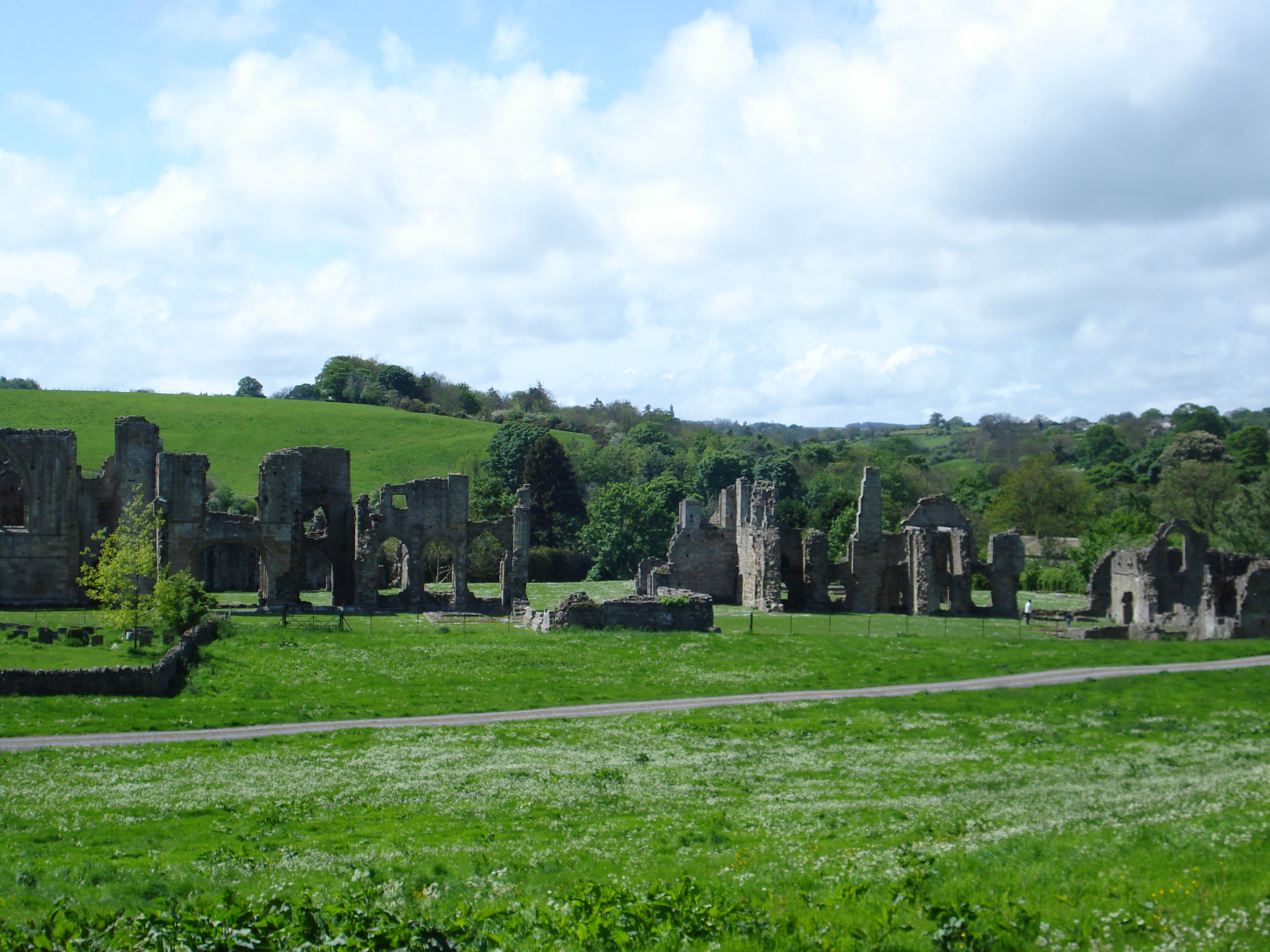
View of Easby Abbey from the north-east, May 2007

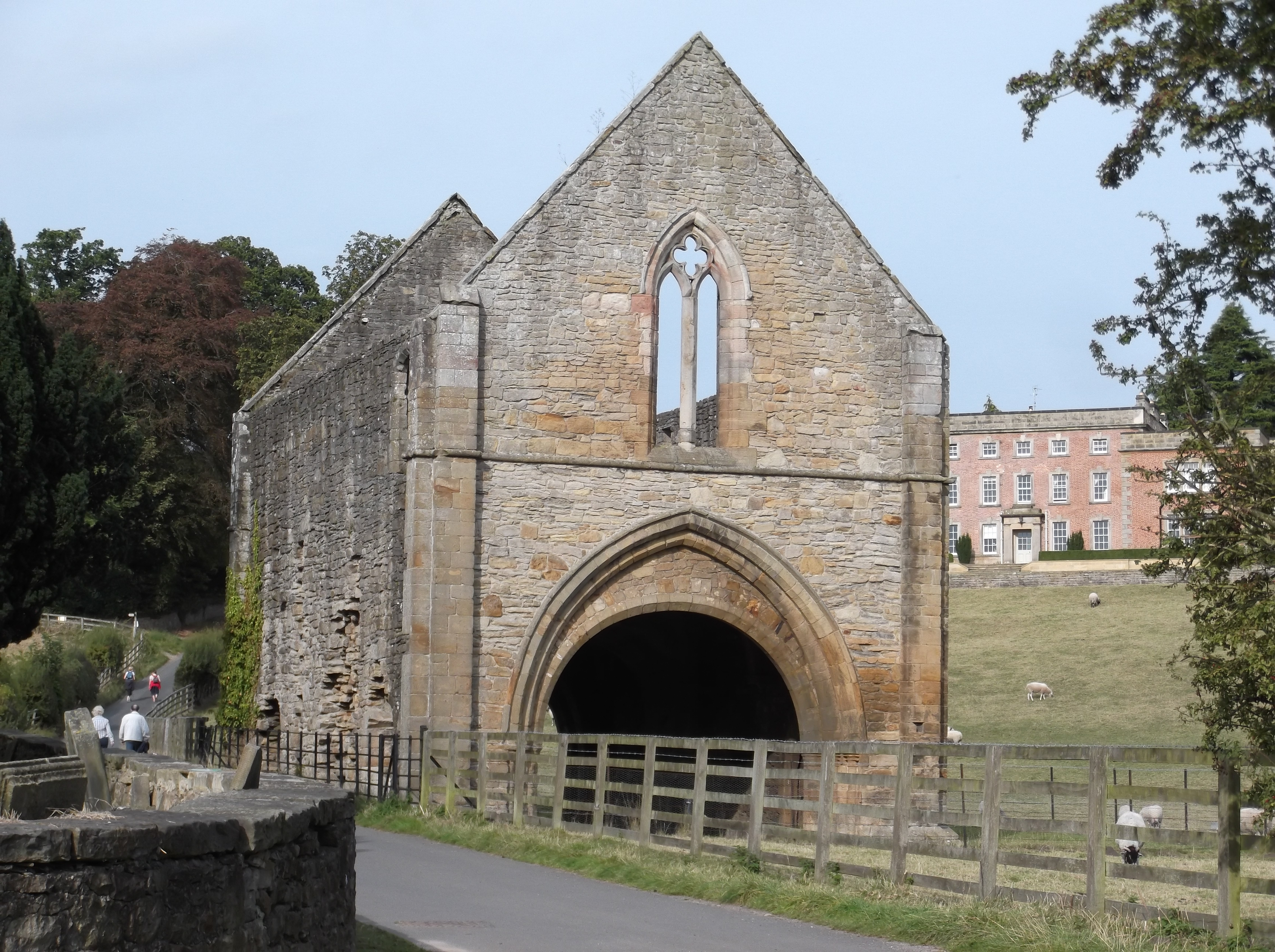
Abbey gatehouse

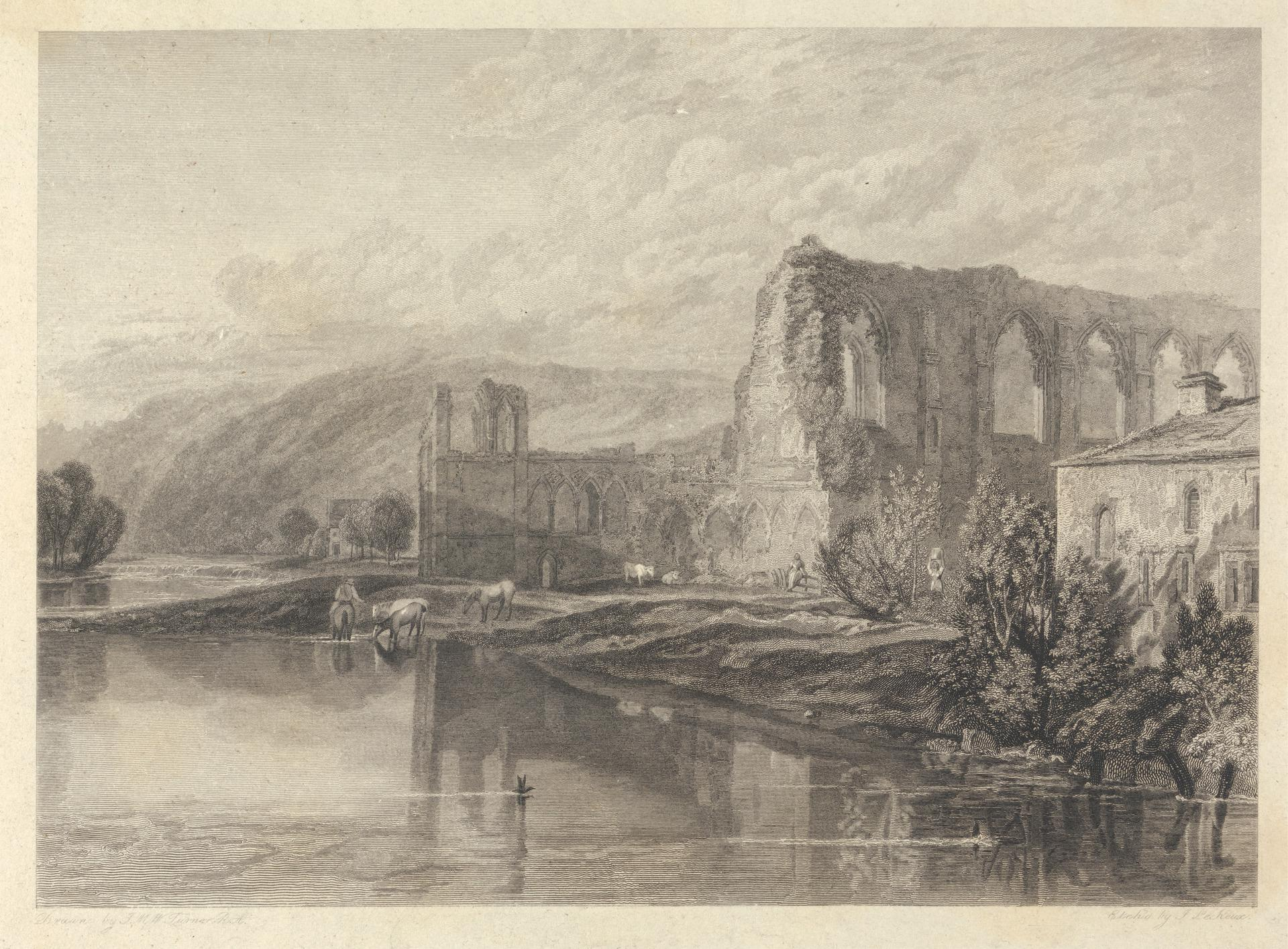
A depiction of the ruins from between 1818 and 1823

== Burials ==
- Henry le Scrope was buried at the Abbey
- William le Scrope (son of Henry), who was a soldier who distinguished himself in the French and Scottish wars (also buried at the Abbey)
- Richard le Scrope, 1st Baron Scrope of Bolton was buried at the Abbey in 1403.
- Roger Scrope, 2nd Baron Scrope of Bolton, also buried at the Abbey
- Richard Scrope, 3rd Baron Scrope of Bolton
- Henry Scrope, 4th Baron Scrope of Bolton
- John Scrope, 5th Baron Scrope of Bolton

== See also ==
- List of monastic houses in North Yorkshire
- List of monastic houses in England
- Grade I listed buildings in North Yorkshire (district)
- Listed buildings in Easby, Richmondshire
