= 1889 North Riding County Council election =

1889 English local government election

North Riding (red) within Yorkshire (green) and England

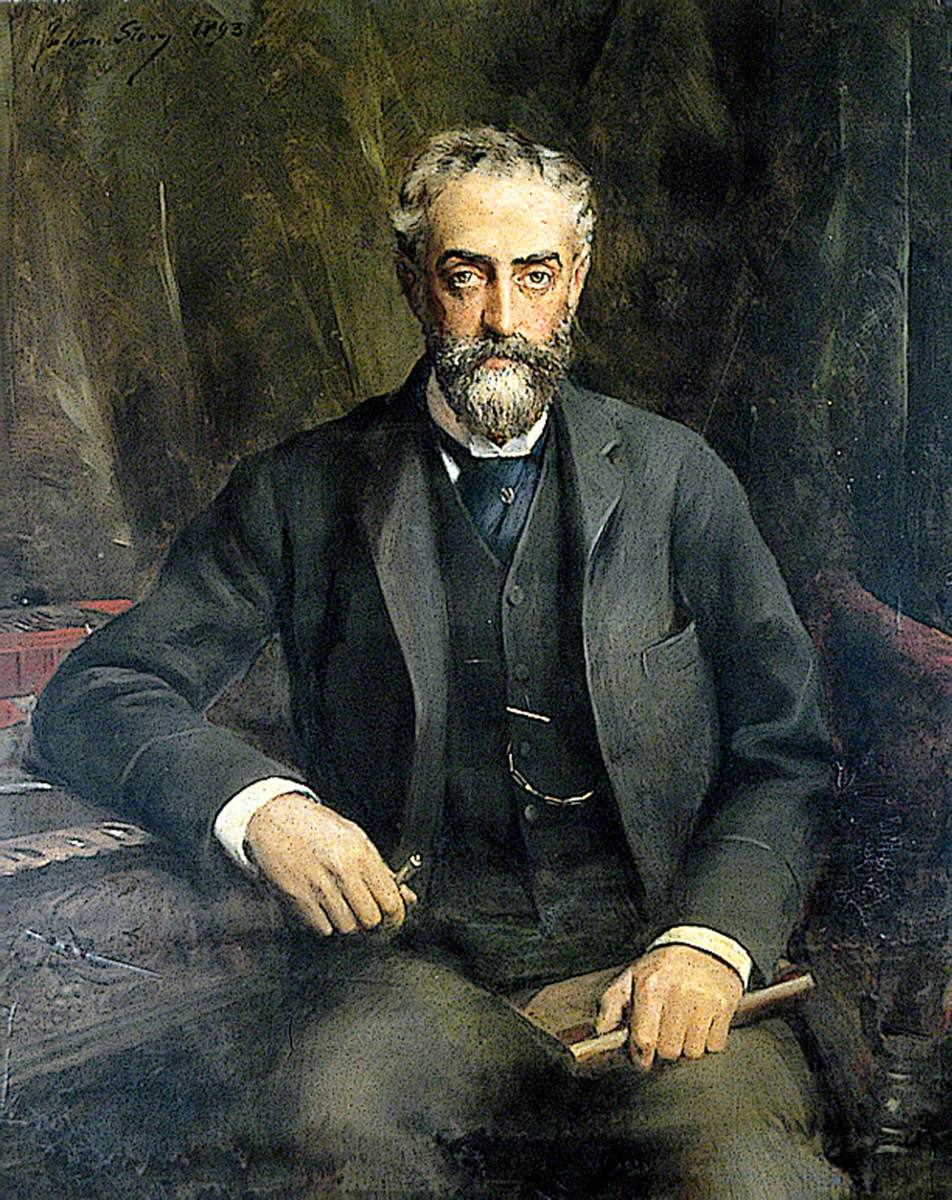
Inaugural chairman, J. C. Dundas

The inaugural elections to the North Riding County Council were held on 24 January 1889. The North Riding was one of three divisions of the historic county of Yorkshire in England; it consisted of the ancient wapentakes (or hundreds) of Gilling West, Hang West, Gilling East, Hang East, Allertonshire, Halikeld, Langbaurgh West, Birdforth, Bulmer, Ryedale, Langbaurgh East, Whitby Strand and Pickering Lythe. The new council consisted of 60 members (one for each of 60 divisions), with 20 more voting aldermen to be elected by the new council. 30 of the seats were contested while 30 were uncontested. The election saw control of the council being taken by Conservative candidates, although these candidates were largely Independent conservatives as opposed to being party activists.

Following the election, the first Chairman of the Council was John Dundas, who remained in office until 1892.

== A new authority ==
The Local Government Act 1888 created county councils throughout England and Wales, to take over various administrative functions until then carried out by the unelected Quarter Sessions. They gained some of their powers under the Act on 1 April 1889, and their full powers on 22 September 1889. These included repairing county roads and bridges; maintaining court houses, police stations, and county halls; providing an asylum for pauper lunatics and reformatory and industrial schools; and being responsible for weights and measures and the control of contagious diseases in animals. The areas they covered were called administrative counties and were not in all cases identical to the traditional counties, but in the North Riding the whole county came under the authority of the new county council, as there were no towns or cities large enough to be treated as county boroughs (although there were in the West and East Ridings).

== Results ==
North Riding County Council election, 1889
Party	Seats	Gains	Losses	Net gain/loss	Seats %	Votes %	Votes	+/−
Conservative	14	Steady	Steady	Steady	23.3	23.0	3,906	Steady
Liberal	8	Steady	Steady	Steady	13.3	20.8	3,528	Steady
Independent	2	Steady	Steady	Steady	3.4	9.4	1,597	Steady
Liberal Unionist	0	Steady	Steady	Steady	0	1.0	168	Steady
Unknown party	36	Steady	Steady	Steady	60.0	45.9	7,802	Steady

=== Composition ===
The traditions of county government by Quarter Sessions were so long, often being passed on from one generation to another in the same families, that it is not surprising to find that the nature of the membership of the new authority was keenly debated: many, particularly Conservatives, saw the Local Government Act as the end of the role of the magistrate in county government; while on the other hand, many Liberals were worried that little or no change in membership would result.

When the North Riding election returns were in, it was clear that the Liberal prediction was the more accurate. Although a considerable portion of the Council was new blood (21 out of 60 members), the justices had a clear majority. 16 of the members returned unopposed were justices: in many cases they were the established local gentry, men like Sir Henry Beresford-Peirse at Bedale, the Earl of Feversham at Helmsley, Sir William Worsley at Hovingham and the Earl of Zetland at Marske. It was rare for a justice to be defeated, although this happened where more than one contested the same seat.

Although Conservatives repeatedly asserted prior to the elections that they should be conducted on a non-political basis, the composition of the council suggests that party affiliation remained influential. In its final form, the county council included a substantial Conservative majority, with significantly fewer Liberal members.

At the time, the provisional chairman expressed the view that the selection of aldermen ought not to be shaped by political considerations. However, the voting pattern indicated a high degree of consistency among Conservative councillors, who largely supported the same group of candidates. As a result, most of the aldermen appointed were not existing members of the council, which limited the direct influence of the electorate in their selection. The majority of aldermen appointed were Conservatives, many of whom were drawn from landed backgrounds.

== Results by division ==
=== Aysgarth ===
Aysgarth
Party	Candidate	Votes	%	±%
	James Winn	Uncontested		

=== Bedale ===
Bedale
Party	Candidate	Votes	%	±%
	Henry Monson De La Poer Beresford-Peirse	Uncontested		

=== Brompton ===
Brompton
Party	Candidate	Votes	%	±%
	Benjamin Wilford	374	58.8	
	W W Romanby	262	41.2	
Majority		251	39.4	
Turnout		636		

=== Brotton ===
Brotton
Party	Candidate	Votes	%	±%
Conservative	Thomas Hugh Bell	422	56.3	
	Mr Stevens	327	43.7	
Majority		95	12.7	
Turnout		749		

=== Catterick ===
Catterick
Party	Candidate	Votes	%	±%
	William Charge Booth	Uncontested		

=== Clifton ===
Clifton
Party	Candidate	Votes	%	±%
	James Melrose	Uncontested		

=== Croft ===
Croft
Party	Candidate	Votes	%	±%
Conservative	William Wilson-Todd	Uncontested		

=== Easingwold ===
Easingwold
Party	Candidate	Votes	%	±%
	Henry Hawking	Uncontested		

=== Eskdaleside ===
Eskdaleside
Party	Candidate	Votes	%	±%
	Thomas Bagnall	Uncontested		

=== Eston North ===
Eston North
Party	Candidate	Votes	%	±%
	William Seymour	Uncontested		

=== Eston South ===
Eston South
Party	Candidate	Votes	%	±%
Liberal	Elisha Beacham	243	50.5	
Liberal Unionist	Carl Bolckow	168	34.9	
Conservative	Nicholas Robert Fleming	70	14.6	
Majority		75	15.6	
Turnout		481		

=== Flaxton ===
Flaxton
Party	Candidate	Votes	%	±%
	William Abel Wood	267	51.1	
	William Benson Richardson	255	48.9	
Majority		12	2.3	
Turnout		522		

=== Gilling ===
Gilling
Party	Candidate	Votes	%	±%
	Samuel Rowlandson	Uncontested		

=== Great Ayton ===
Great Ayton
Party	Candidate	Votes	%	±%
	William Winn	Uncontested		

=== Guisborough ===
Guisborough
Party	Candidate	Votes	%	±%
Liberal	Alfred Edward Pease	421	61.5	
	J E Whittaker	263	38.5	
Majority		158	23.1	
Turnout		684		

=== Helmsley ===
Helmsley
Party	Candidate	Votes	%	±%
Conservative	William Duncombe, 1st Earl of Feversham	Uncontested		

=== Hinderwell ===
Hinderwell
Party	Candidate	Votes	%	±%
Liberal	Charles Palmer	333	53.5	
Liberal	John Valentine Laverick	290	56.5	
Majority		43	6.9	
Turnout		623		

=== Hovingham ===
Hovingham
Party	Candidate	Votes	%	±%
Conservative	William Cayley Worsley	Uncontested		

=== Kirbymoorside ===
Kirbymoorside
Party	Candidate	Votes	%	±%
	Cecil Duncombe	470	56.8	
	Richard Foxton	358	43.2	
Majority		112	13.5	
Turnout		828		

=== Kirkleatham ===
Kirkleatham
Party	Candidate	Votes	%	±%
	William Eden Walker	303	56.2	
	James Rutherford	236	43.8	
Majority		67	12.4	
Turnout		539		

=== Leyburn ===
Leyburn
Party	Candidate	Votes	%	±%
Conservative	William Orde-Powlett, 5th Baron Bolton	398	60.5	
	James J Maclaren	260	39.5	
Majority		138	21.0	
Turnout		658		

=== Loftus ===
Loftus
Party	Candidate	Votes	%	±%
	George Henry Anderson	Uncontested		

=== Lythe ===
Lythe
Party	Candidate	Votes	%	±%
	George Pyman	Uncontested		

=== Malton ===
Malton
Party	Candidate	Votes	%	±%
Liberal	Joshua Hartley	521	76.3	
	George Foster	157	23.0	
Majority		364	53.3	
Rejected ballots		5	0.7	
Turnout		683	73.8	
Registered electors		925		

=== Marske ===
Marske
Party	Candidate	Votes	%	±%
Conservative	Lawrence Dundas, 2nd Marquess of Zetland	Unopposed		

=== Masham ===
Masham
Party	Candidate	Votes	%	±%
Independent	Charles Dodsworth	372	55.9	
Independent	James Gothorp	293	44.1	
Majority		79	11.9	
Turnout		665	75.9	
Registered electors		876		

=== Middleham ===
Middleham
Party	Candidate	Votes	%	±%
	Simon Thomas Scrope	Uncontested		

=== Normanby ===
Normanby
Party	Candidate	Votes	%	±%
	James Glen			

=== Northallerton ===
Northallerton
Party	Candidate	Votes	%	±%
Conservative	John Hutton	314	53.6	
Conservative	C Palliser	272	46.4	
Majority		42	7.2	
Turnout		586		

=== Norton ===
Norton
Party	Candidate	Votes	%	±%
	Digby Cayley	Uncontested		

=== Ormesby ===
Ormesby
Party	Candidate	Votes	%	±%
Liberal	Isaac Wilson	Uncontested		

=== Osmotherley ===
Osmotherley
Party	Candidate	Votes	%	±%
	John James Emerson	328	50.3	
	John Yeoman	324	49.7	
Majority		4		
Turnout		652	0.6	

=== Pickering ===
Pickering
Party	Candidate	Votes	%	±%
Conservative	James Mitchelson Mitchelson	345	50.7	
Liberal	Robert Frank	336	49.3	
Majority		9	1.3	
Turnout		681		

=== Redcar and Saltburn ===
Redcar and Saltburn
Party	Candidate	Votes	%	±%
Liberal	John Dundas	330	50.4	
	Joseph Walton	325	49.6	
Majority		5	0.8	
Turnout		655		

=== Reeth ===
Reeth
Party	Candidate	Votes	%	±%
	Edmund Alderson Knowles	401	71.5	
	Francis Garth	160	28.5	
Majority		241	43.0	
Turnout		561		

=== Richmond ===
Richmond
Party	Candidate	Votes	%	±%
Conservative	Gerald Walker	300	53.5	
Conservative	George Roper	261	46.5	
Majority		39	7.0	
Turnout		561		

=== Ruswarp ===
Ruswarp
Party	Candidate	Votes	%	±%
	John Stevenson	Uncontested		

=== Scalby ===
Scalby
Party	Candidate	Votes	%	±%
	Francis Vanden-Bempde-Johnstone	Uncontested		

=== Scarborough Central ===
Scarborough Central
Party	Candidate	Votes	%	±%
	John Woodall Woodall	Uncontested		

=== Scarborough East ===
Scarborough East
Party	Candidate	Votes	%	±%
	Charles William Woodall	Uncontested		

=== Scarborough North ===
Scarborough North
Party	Candidate	Votes	%	±%
	Robert Forster	Uncontested		

=== Scarborough North West ===
Scarborough North West
Party	Candidate	Votes	%	±%
	John Greaves Smirthwaite	Uncontested		

=== Scarborough South ===
Scarborough South
Party	Candidate	Votes	%	±%
	John Dale	Uncontested		

=== Scarborough West ===
Scarborough West
Party	Candidate	Votes	%	±%
Liberal	Robert Peel Clarkson	409	67.9	
Conservative	E Keighley	193	32.1	
Majority		216	35.9	
Turnout		602		

=== Sheriff Hutton ===
Sheriff Hutton
Party	Candidate	Votes	%	±%
	Thomas John Kinnear	205	36.7	
	John Coates	196	35.1	
	Arthur Everett	157	28.1	
Majority		9	1.6	
Turnout		558		

=== Skelton ===
Skelton
Party	Candidate	Votes	%	±%
Conservative	William Henry Anthony Wharton	381	67.8	
	John M Gowland	181	32.2	
Majority		200	35.6	
Turnout		562		

=== Snainton ===
Snainton
Party	Candidate	Votes	%	±%
	Thomas Byron	Uncontested		

=== South Otterington ===
South Otterington
Party	Candidate	Votes	%	±%
	William Newsome Baxter	271	46.4	
Conservative	Edmund Turton	199	34.0	
	Mr Kirby	114	19.5	
Majority		72	12.3	
Turnout		584		

=== Startforth ===
Startforth
Party	Candidate	Votes	%	±%
	Robert Barker	442	52.3	
	Mr Dent	403	47.7	
Majority		39	4.6	
Turnout		845		

=== Stillington ===
Stillington
Party	Candidate	Votes	%	±%
Conservative	John Newton	272	40.5	
Liberal	Robert Souter	215	32.0	
	Mr Graves	185	27.5	
Majority		57	8.5	
Turnout		672		

=== Stokesley ===
Stokesley
Party	Candidate	Votes	%	±%
	Edward Wynne-Finch	Uncontested		

=== Thirsk ===
Thirsk
Party	Candidate	Votes	%	±%
Conservative	Reginald Bell	Uncontested		

=== Thornaby North ===
Thornaby North
Party	Candidate	Votes	%	±%
	William Whitwell			

=== Thornaby South ===
Thornaby South
Party	Candidate	Votes	%	±%
	Charles Arthur Head	Uncontested		

=== Thornton ===
Thornton
Party	Candidate	Votes	%	±%
Conservative	William Scoby	Uncontested		

=== Topcliffe ===
Topcliffe
Party	Candidate	Votes	%	±%
	John I'Anson	329	59.2	
	Mr Smith	227	40.8	
Majority		102	18.3	
Turnout		556		

=== Wath ===
Wath
Party	Candidate	Votes	%	±%
Independent	Jacob Smith	517	55.5	
Independent	Thomas Highmoor	415	44.5	
Majority		102	11.0	
Turnout		932		

=== Whitby East ===
Whitby East
Party	Candidate	Votes	%	±%
Liberal	James Menzies Clayhills	430	62.8	
Conservative	Harrison Weighill	255	37.2	
Majority		175	25.5	
Turnout		685		

=== Whitby West ===
Whitby West
Party	Candidate	Votes	%	±%
	Robert Elliott Pannett	Uncontested		

=== Yarm ===
Yarm
Party	Candidate	Votes	%	±%
Conservative	William Hedley	224	52.0	
	C Middleton	207	48.0	
Majority		17	3.9	
Turnout		431	57.5	
Registered electors		750		
