= List of wapentakes in Yorkshire =

This is a list of wapentakes in Yorkshire. The wapentakes of Ewcross, Osgoldcross and Staincross, were believed to have their meeting places marked with a cross.

== North Riding of Yorkshire ==
1. Gilling West
2. Hang West
3. Gilling East
4. Hang East
5. Allertonshire
6. Halikeld
7. Langbaurgh West

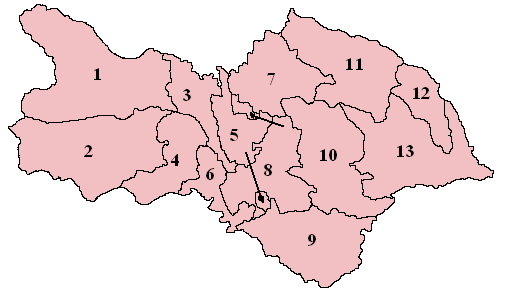
Wapentakes

8. Birdforth
9. Bulmer
10. Ryedale
11. Langbaurgh East
12. Whitby Strand
13. Pickering Lythe

== East Riding of Yorkshire ==
1. Ouse and Derwent
2. Buckrose
3. Harthill – Wilton Beacon Division
4. Harthill – Holme Beacon Division
5. Howdenshire
6. Harthill – Hunsley Beacon Division

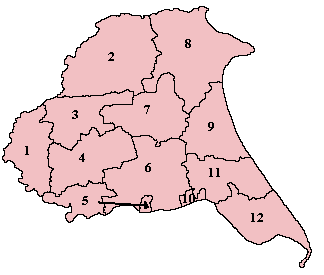
Wapentakes

7. Harthill – Bainton Beacon Division
8. Dickering
9. Holderness – North Division
10. Kingston-upon-Hull (county corporate)
11. Holderness – Middle Division
12. Holderness – South Division

== West Riding of Yorkshire ==
1. Ewcross
2. Staincliffe – West Division
3. Staincliffe – East Division
4. Claro – Lower Division
5. Strafforth and Tickhill – Lower Division
6. Morley
7. Skyrack – Upper Division
8. Claro – Upper Division
9. Skyrack – Lower Division
10. Barkston Ash
11. Agbrigg
12. Staincross
13. Osgoldcross
14. Strafforth and Tickhill – Upper Division

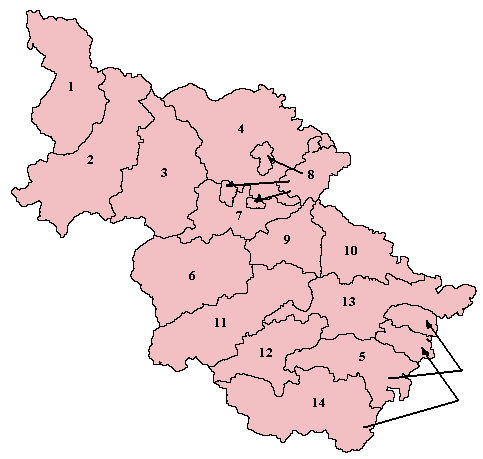
Wapentakes

== Ainsty and the City of York ==
Wapentakes

As York acted as the capital of Yorkshire and it is right in the centre at the junction of the three ridings, it (along with the wapentake of Ainsty) had its own neutral area, which was not part of any of the three ridings.
