= North Yorkshire (district) =

Unitary authority area in England

- Unitary authority area
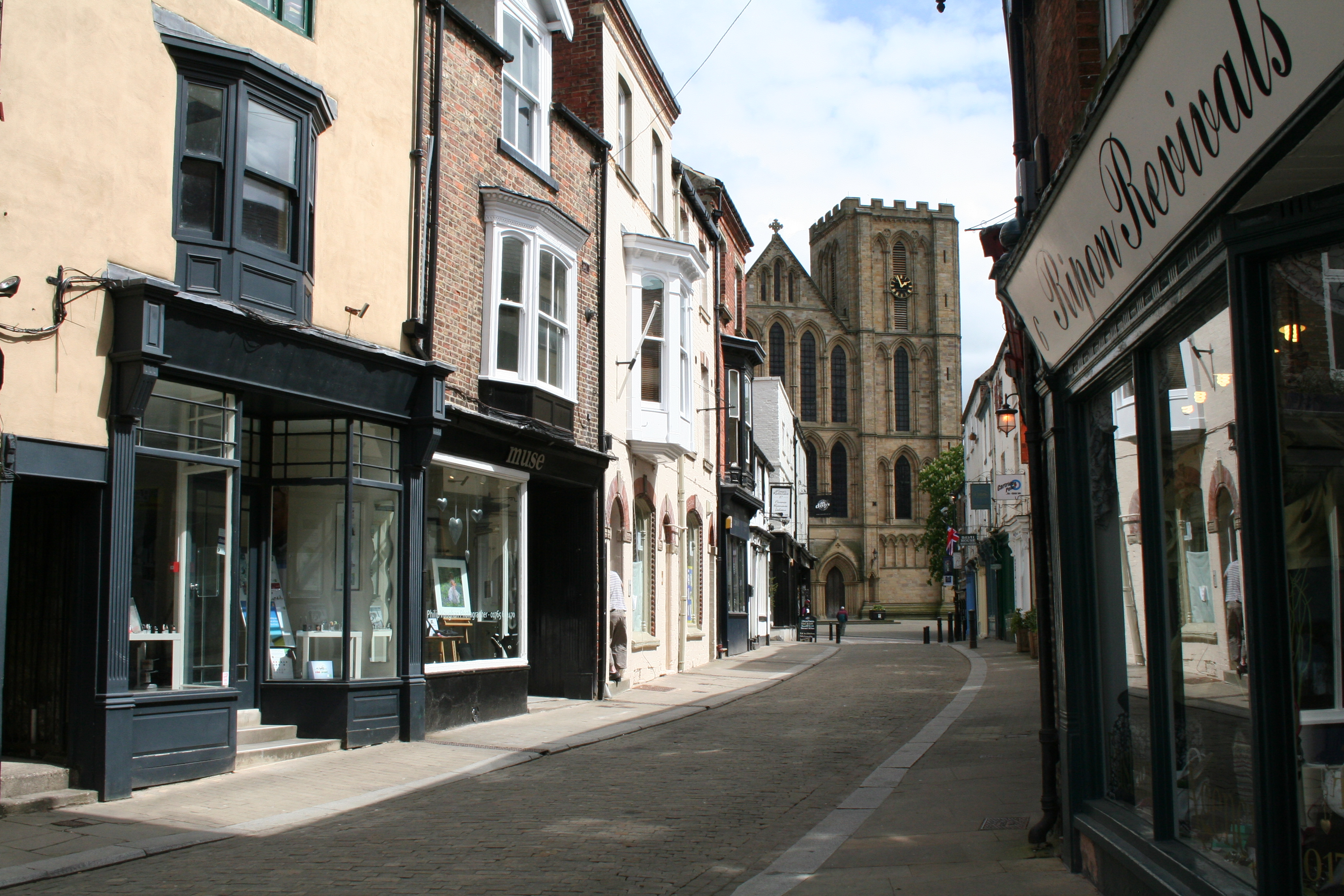
- Ripon, the only city in the district and its third-largest settlement

- North Yorkshire district shown within North Yorkshire ceremonial county
- Coordinates: 54°10′N 1°20′W
- Sovereign state: United Kingdom
- Country: England
- Region: Yorkshire and the Humber
- Ceremonial county: North Yorkshire
- Combined authority: York and North Yorkshire
- Incorporated: 1 April 2023
- Administrative HQ: County Hall, Northallerton

Government
  - Type: Unitary authority
  - Body: North Yorkshire Council
  - Executive: Leader and cabinet
  - Control: No overall control
  - MPs: 7 MPs: Tom Gordon (LD); Kevin Hollinrake (C); Alison Hume (L); Keir Mather (L); Alec Shelbrooke (C); Julian Smith (C); Rishi Sunak (C)

Area
  - Total: 3,103 sq mi (8,037 km^{2})
  - Rank: 1st

Population (2025)
  - Total: 639,133
  - Rank: 3rd
  - Density: 210/sq mi (80/km^{2})

Ethnicity (2021)
  - Ethnic groups: List: 96.7% White; 1.4% Asian; 1.1% Mixed; 0.4% Black; 0.5% other

Religion (2021)
  - Religion: List: 55.6% Christianity; 36.9% no religion; 0.5% Islam; 0.3% Buddhism; 0.3% Hinduism; 0.1% Judaism; 0.1% Sikhism; 0.4% other; 5.8% not stated
- Time zone: UTC+0 (GMT)
  - Summer (DST): UTC+1 (BST)
- Postcode areas: List: BD20, BD22–24; DL6–11; HG; LA2, LA6; LS17, LS21–25, LS29; TS9; YO7, YO8, YO11–14, YO17–24, YO26, YO30, YO51, YO60–62
- GSS code: E06000065
- Website: northyorks.gov.uk

North Yorkshire (legally, the County of North Yorkshire) is a non-metropolitan county and unitary authority area in the ceremonial county of North Yorkshire, England. It covers the majority of the North York Moors, the Vale of Mowbray and Vale of York, and the Yorkshire Dales. It does not include the north-east of the ceremonial county or the unitary authority area of York. The largest settlement is Harrogate, and the administrative centre is Northallerton. North Yorkshire is the largest local government area in England, with an area of 3,103 square miles (8,037 km^{2}).

== History ==
North Yorkshire non-metropolitan county was formed on 1 April 1974 as a result of the Local Government Act 1972. It covered most of the North Riding of Yorkshire, as well as northern parts of the West Riding of Yorkshire, northern and eastern East Riding of Yorkshire and the former county borough of York. From 1974 to 1996 the area of the non-metropolitan county was the same as the area of the ceremonial county. The county was divided into eight districts (York, Craven, Hambleton, Harrogate, Richmondshire, Ryedale, Scarborough and Selby).

On 1 April 1996, the City of York district and parts of the three adjoining districts (Haxby and nearby rural areas) became the City of York unitary authority.

On 1 April 2023, the non-metropolitan county became a unitary authority during the 2019–2023 structural changes to local government in England. The creation of the unitary authority area was achieved by abolishing the seven districts and their councils, creating a new district covering the entire area of the non-metropolitan county, and giving North Yorkshire County Council the responsibilities of a district council in addition to its existing county council responsibilities.

Boundaries of the seven defunct districts within North Yorkshire District

The seven former districts were:

Former non-metropolitan districts
#	Local authority	2011 census	2021 census
1	Harrogate	157,869	164,105
2	Scarborough	108,793	108,959
3	Hambleton	89,140	91,037
4	Selby	83,449	92,401
5	Craven	55,409	57,090
6	Richmondshire	51,965	50,358
7	Ryedale	51,751	54,897

The county council chose to rename itself North Yorkshire Council as part of the restructure. The first elections to the reconstituted authority took place on 5 May 2022, and it took on district council responsibilities on 1 April 2023.

== Governance ==
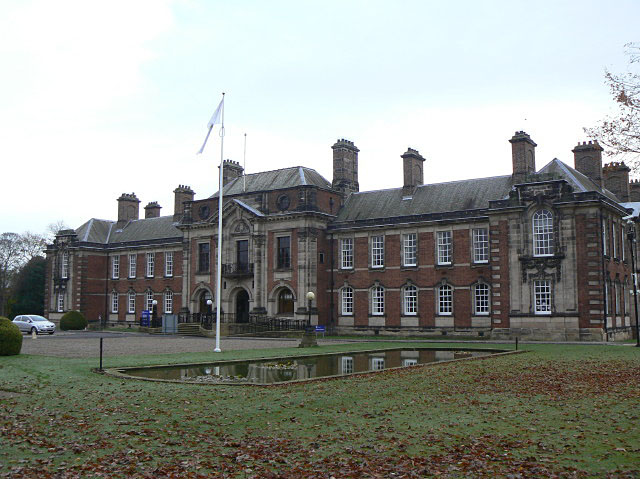
County Hall, the district administrative centre in Northallerton

North Yorkshire Council has 90 councillors which elect a council leader, who in turn appoints up to nine councillors to form an executive cabinet. It replaces the former county council which had a cabinet-style council of 72 councillors.

== Geography ==
The area is the largest local authority area in England. Larger towns and settlements include Harrogate, Scarborough, Northallerton, Selby, Skipton, Richmond, Malton, Thirsk, Stokesley, Great Ayton, Norton-on-Derwent, Catterick Garrison, Pickering, Helmsley and Knaresborough while Ripon is the only city in the area.

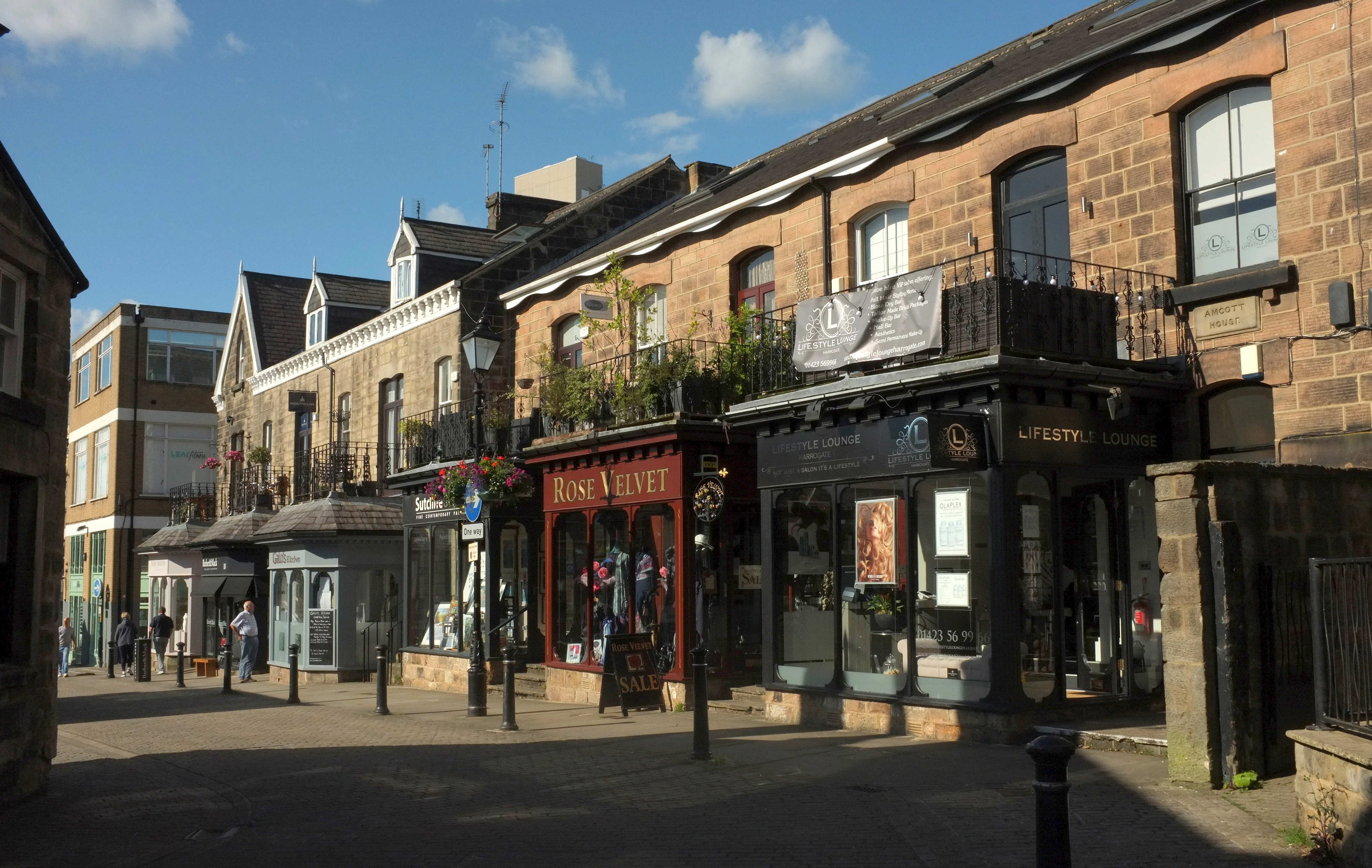
Harrogate

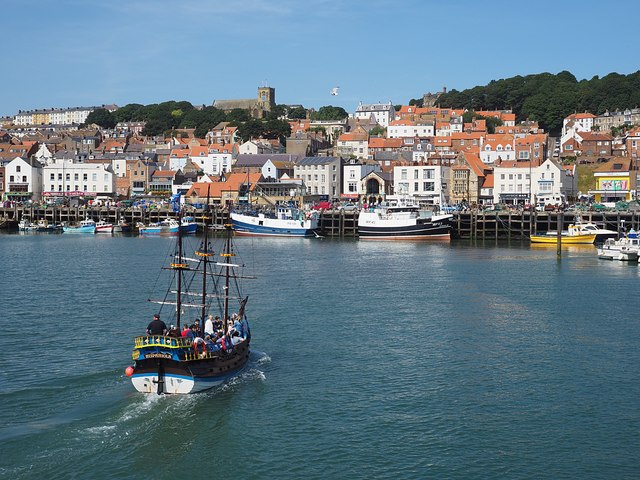
Scarborough

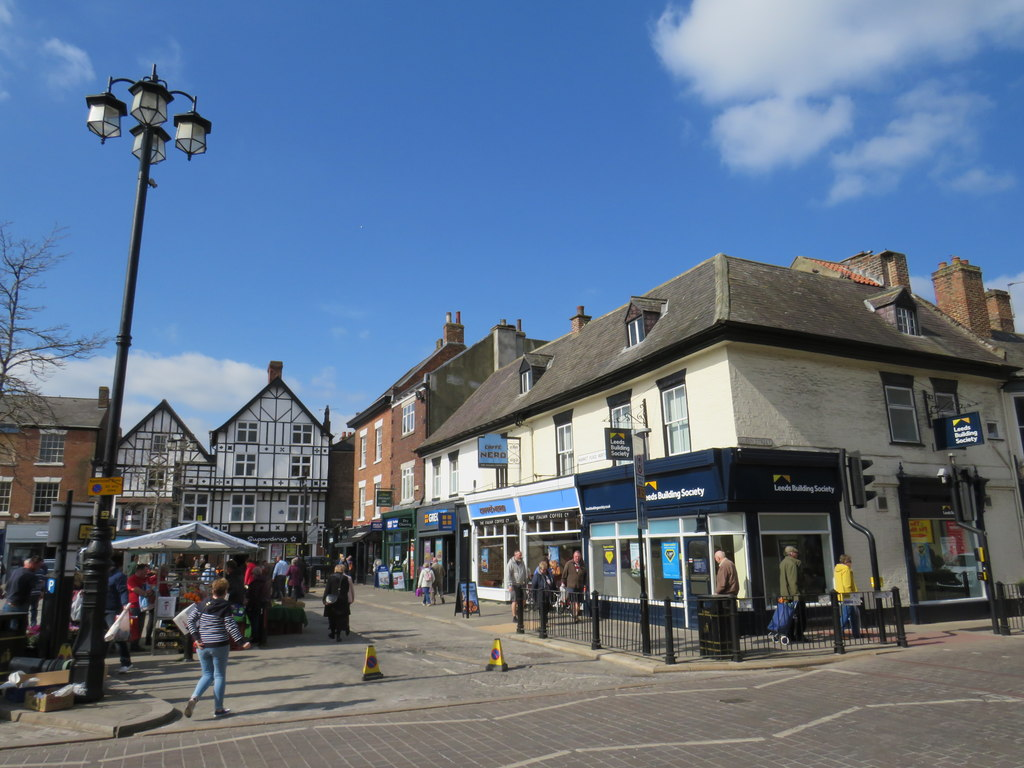
Ripon

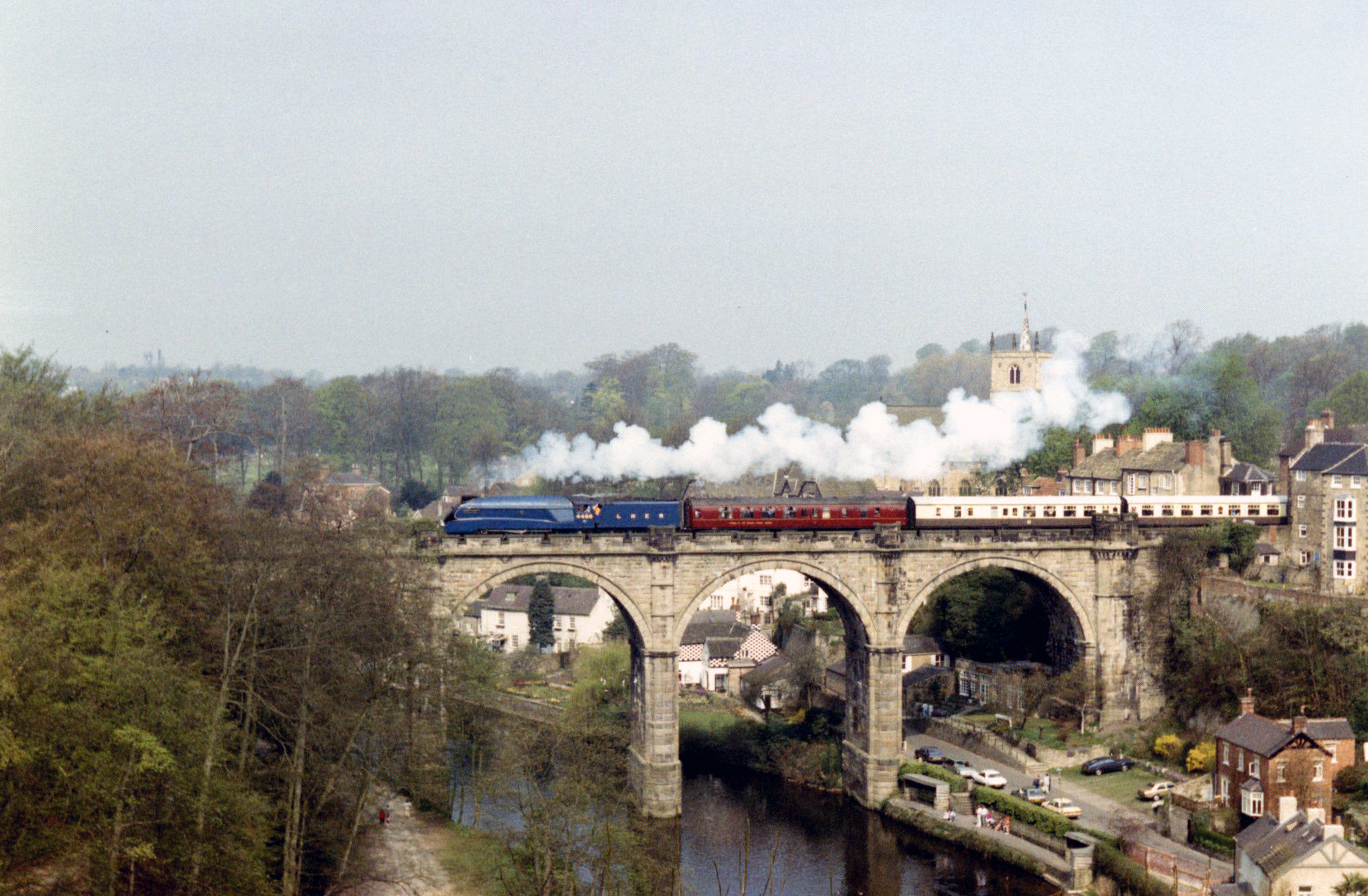
Knaresborough

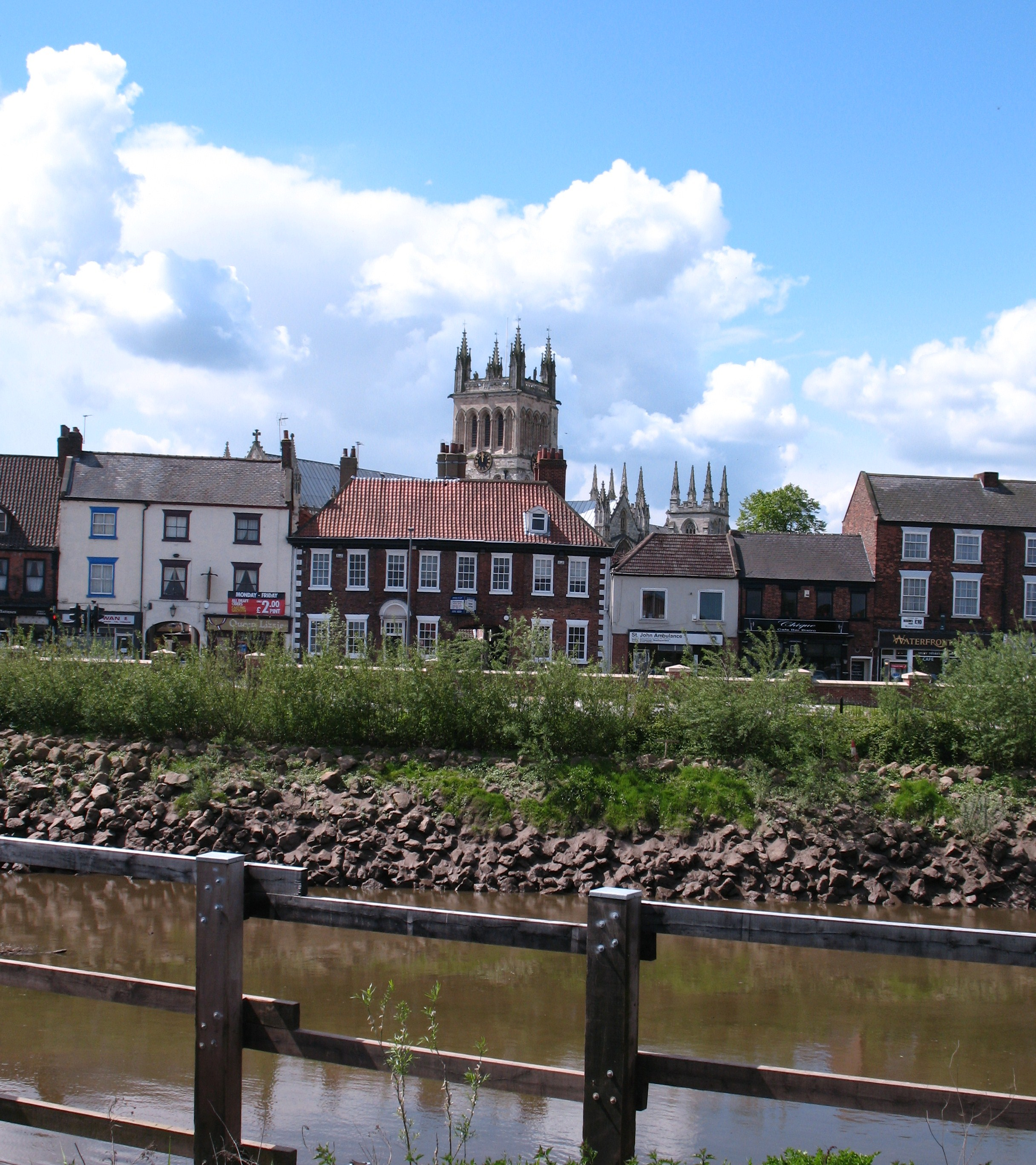
Selby

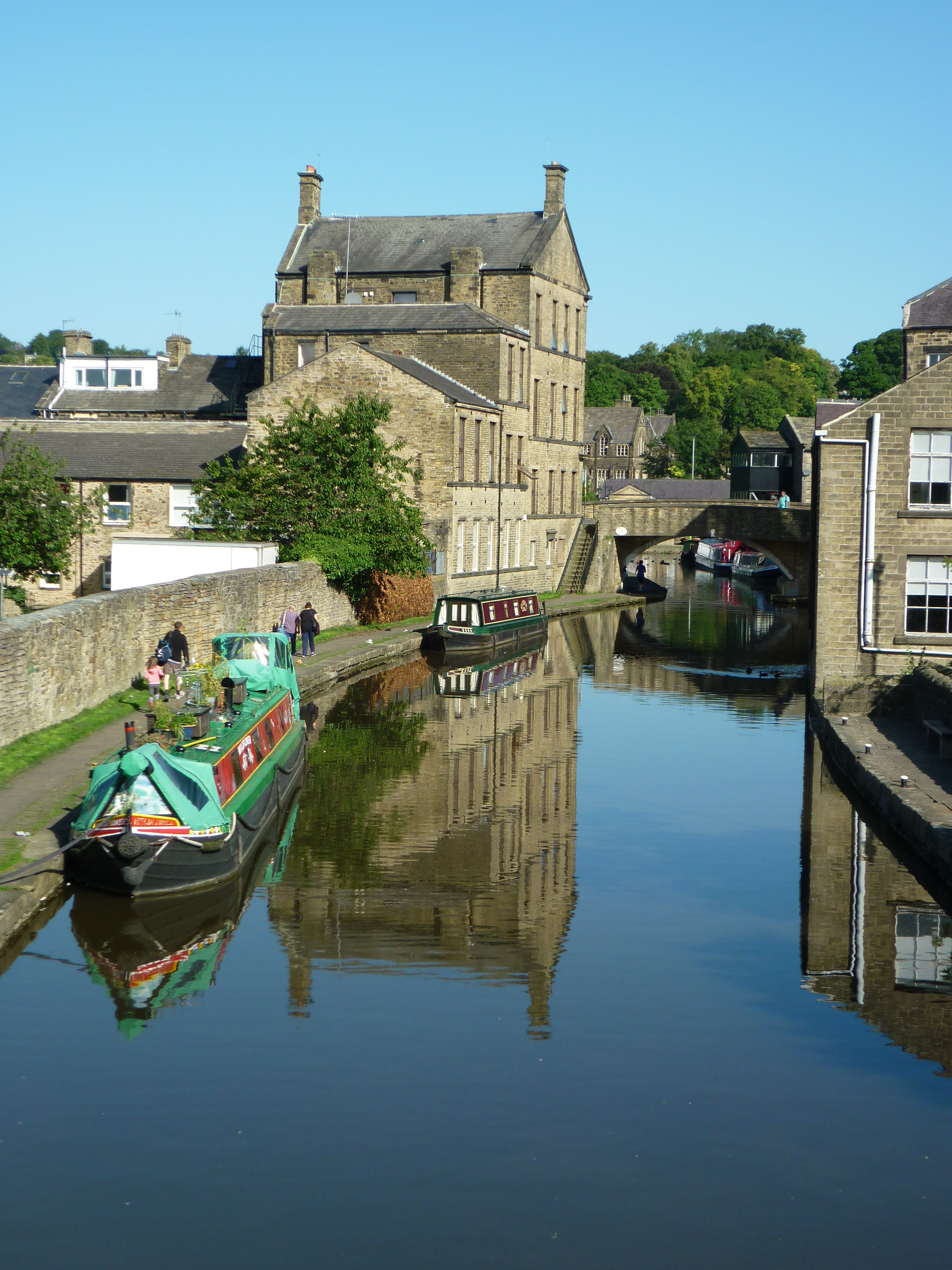
Skipton

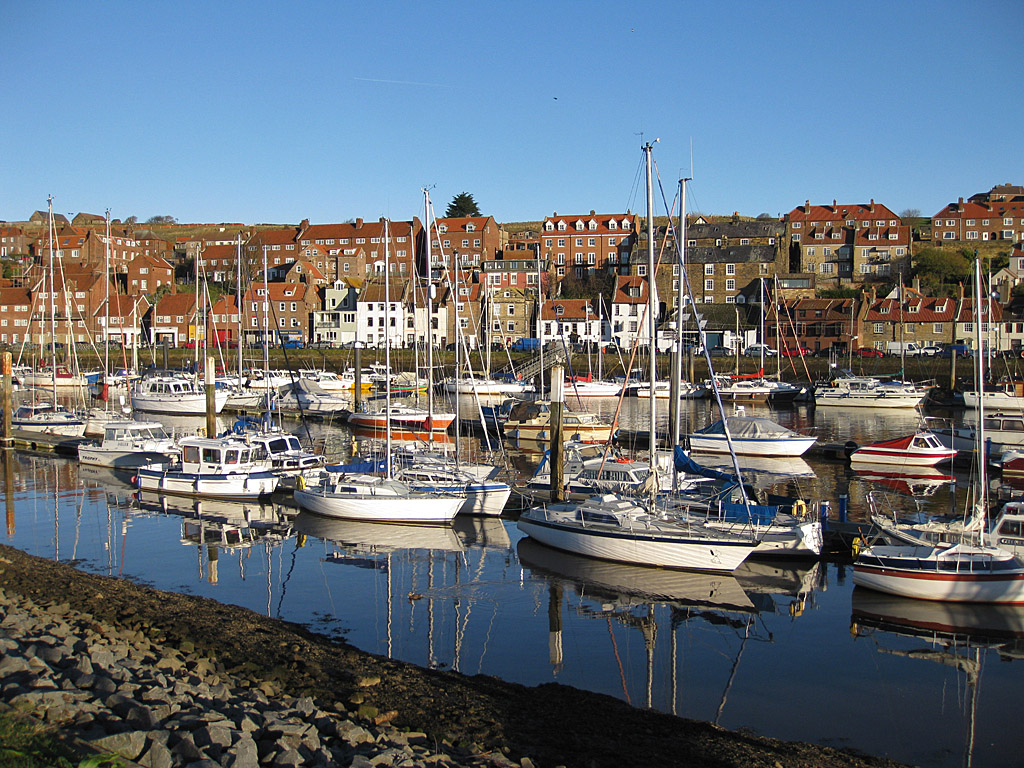
Whitby

Neighbouring council areas
Local authority	In relation to North Yorkshire
County Durham	North
Darlington	North
Stockton-on-Tees	North east
Middlesbrough	North east
Redcar and Cleveland	North east
East Riding of Yorkshire	South east
City of York	South east
City of Doncaster	South
City of Wakefield	South west
City of Leeds	South west
City of Bradford	South west
Pendle	West
Ribble Valley	West
City of Lancaster	West
Westmorland and Furness	North west

== Education ==
North Yorkshire LEA has a mostly comprehensive education system with 42 state schools secondary (not including sixth form colleges) and 12 independent schools.
