= 1892 North Riding County Council election =

1892 English local government election

North Riding (red) within Yorkshire (green) and England

The second elections to the North Riding County Council were held on Thursday, 3 March 1892. The North Riding was one of three divisions of the historic county of Yorkshire in England. The county council consisted of 59 members (one for each of 59 divisions - having decreased from 60 with the transfer of Norton to the East Riding in 1889), with 20 more voting aldermen to be elected by the new council. 12 of the seats were contested while 47 were uncontested. The election saw control of the council being retained by the Conservatives, although again with a large majority of unaffiliated members.

Following the election, John Dundas and George Lascelles were re-elected as the chairman and vice-chairman of the council at its first meeting, held on 16 March 1892. Lascelles succeeded Dundas in the chair following his death that September.

== Results ==
North Riding County Council election, 1892
Party	Seats	Gains	Losses	Net gain/loss	Seats %	Votes %	Votes	+/−
Conservative	16	4	2	▲2	27.1	54.0	4,442	
Liberal	6	2	4	▼2	10.2	33.1	2,720	
Labour	0	Steady	Steady	Steady	0	6.3	520	
Unknown party	37	2	2	▲1	62.7	6.6	547	

== Results by division ==
Incumbent councillors are marked by an asterisk (*).

=== Aysgarth ===
Aysgarth
Party	Candidate	Votes	%	±%
	James Winn*	Uncontested		

=== Bedale ===
Bedale
Party	Candidate	Votes	%	±%
	Henry Monson De La Poer Beresford-Peirse*	Uncontested		

=== Brompton ===
Brompton
Party	Candidate	Votes	%	±%
	Benjamin Wilford*	Uncontested		

=== Brotton ===
Brotton
Party	Candidate	Votes	%	±%
Liberal	George Lancaster	410	51.2	New
Conservative	Thomas Hugh Bell*	383	47.8	−8.5
Majority		27	3.4	−9.3
Rejected ballots		9	1.1	
Turnout		802		
Liberal gain from Conservative		Swing		

=== Catterick ===
Catterick
Party	Candidate	Votes	%	±%
	William Charge Booth*	Uncontested		

=== Clifton ===
Clifton
Party	Candidate	Votes	%	±%
	James Melrose*	Uncontested		

=== Croft ===
Croft
Party	Candidate	Votes	%	±%
Conservative	William Wilson-Todd*	Uncontested		
Conservative hold		Swing		

=== Easingwold ===
Easingwold
Party	Candidate	Votes	%	±%
	Henry Hawking*	Uncontested		

=== Eskdaleside ===
Eskdaleside
Party	Candidate	Votes	%	±%
	John Robinson	Uncontested		

=== Eston North ===
Eston North
Party	Candidate	Votes	%	±%
	William Seymour*	Uncontested		

=== Eston South ===
Eston South
Party	Candidate	Votes	%	±%
Liberal	Elisha Beacham*	Uncontested		
Liberal hold		Swing		

=== Flaxton ===
Flaxton
Party	Candidate	Votes	%	±%
	William Abel Wood*	Uncontested		

=== Gilling ===
Gilling
Party	Candidate	Votes	%	±%
	Samuel Rowlandson*	Uncontested		

=== Great Ayton ===
Great Ayton
Party	Candidate	Votes	%	±%
	William Winn*	Uncontested		

=== Guisborough ===
Guisborough
Party	Candidate	Votes	%	±%
Liberal	Alfred Edward Pease*	Uncontested		
Liberal hold		Swing		

=== Helmsley ===
Helmsley
Party	Candidate	Votes	%	±%
Conservative	William Duncombe, 1st Earl of Feversham*	Uncontested		
Conservative hold		Swing		

=== Hinderwell ===
Hinderwell
Party	Candidate	Votes	%	±%
Liberal	Charles Palmer*	Uncontested		
Liberal hold		Swing		

=== Hovingham ===
Hovingham
Party	Candidate	Votes	%	±%
Conservative	William Cayley Worsley*	284	56.1	
Liberal	Thomas Watts	218	43.1	
Majority		66	13.1	
Rejected ballots		4	0.8	
Turnout		506	81.4	
Registered electors		622		
Conservative hold		Swing		

=== Kirbymoorside ===
Kirbymoorside
Party	Candidate	Votes	%	±%
	Cecil Duncombe*	Uncontested		

=== Kirkleatham ===
Kirkleatham
Party	Candidate	Votes	%	±%
	William Eden Walker*	Uncontested		

=== Leyburn ===
Leyburn
Party	Candidate	Votes	%	±%
Conservative	William Orde-Powlett, 5th Baron Bolton*	Uncontested		
Conservative hold		Swing		

=== Loftus ===
Loftus
Party	Candidate	Votes	%	±%
	George Henry Anderson*	Uncontested		

=== Lythe ===
Lythe
Party	Candidate	Votes	%	±%
	Walter Herbert Septimus Pyman	Uncontested		

=== Malton ===
Malton
Party	Candidate	Votes	%	±%
Conservative	Robert Metcalfe	404	54.9	New
Liberal	Joshua Hartley*	329	44.7	−31.6
Majority		75	10.2	−43.1
Rejected ballots		3	0.4	-0.3
Turnout		736	85.6	+11.8
Registered electors		860		
Conservative gain from Liberal		Swing		

=== Marske ===
Marske
Party	Candidate	Votes	%	±%
Conservative	Lawrence Dundas, 2nd Marquess of Zetland*	476	64.6	
Labour	Alfred Jabez Strong	257	34.9	
Majority		219	29.7	
Rejected ballots		4	0.5	
Turnout		737		
Conservative hold		Swing		

=== Masham ===
Masham
Party	Candidate	Votes	%	±%
Conservative	Powlett Milbank	Uncontested		
Conservative gain from Independent		Swing		

=== Middleham ===
Middleham
Party	Candidate	Votes	%	±%
	Charles James Burrill	Uncontested		

=== Normanby ===
Normanby
Party	Candidate	Votes	%	±%
	James Glen*	Uncontested		

=== Northallerton ===
Northallerton
Party	Candidate	Votes	%	±%
Conservative	John Hutton*	Uncontested		
Conservative hold		Swing		

=== Ormesby ===
Ormesby
Party	Candidate	Votes	%	±%
Liberal	Isaac Wilson*	Uncontested		
Liberal hold		Swing		

=== Osmotherley ===
Osmotherley
Party	Candidate	Votes	%	±%
	John James Emerson*	Uncontested		

=== Pickering ===
Pickering
Party	Candidate	Votes	%	±%
Conservative	James Mitchelson Mitchelson*	345	54.2	+3.5
Liberal	John Frank	292	45.8	−3.5
Majority		53	8.3	+7.0
Turnout		637		
Conservative hold		Swing		

=== Redcar and Saltburn ===
Redcar and Saltburn
Party	Candidate	Votes	%	±%
Conservative	Arthur Dorman	403	51.8	New
Liberal	Joseph Walton	370	47.6	−2.8
Majority		33	4.2	+3.4
Rejected ballots		5	0.6	
Turnout		778		
Conservative gain from Liberal		Swing		

=== Reeth ===
Reeth
Party	Candidate	Votes	%	±%
	Edmund Alderson Knowles*	Uncontested		

=== Richmond ===
Richmond
Party	Candidate	Votes	%	±%
Conservative	Gerald Walker*	Uncontested		
Conservative hold		Swing		

=== Ruswarp ===
Ruswarp
Party	Candidate	Votes	%	±%
	John Henry Harrowing	Uncontested		

=== Scalby ===
Scalby
Party	Candidate	Votes	%	±%
	Francis Vanden-Bempde-Johnstone*	Uncontested		

=== Scarborough Central ===
Scarborough Central
Party	Candidate	Votes	%	±%
	John Woodall Woodall*	Uncontested		

=== Scarborough East ===
Scarborough East
Party	Candidate	Votes	%	±%
	Charles William Woodall*	Uncontested		

=== Scarborough North ===
Scarborough North
Party	Candidate	Votes	%	±%
	Eden Heywood Gawne	Uncontested		

=== Scarborough North West ===
Scarborough North West
Party	Candidate	Votes	%	±%
	John Greaves Smirthwaite*	Uncontested		

=== Scarborough South ===
Scarborough South
Party	Candidate	Votes	%	±%
	Henry Darley*	Uncontested		

=== Scarborough West ===
Scarborough West
Party	Candidate	Votes	%	±%
	John Stephenson	Uncontested		
	Independent gain from Liberal	Swing		

=== Sheriff Hutton ===
Sheriff Hutton
Party	Candidate	Votes	%	±%
	John Coates	388	70.9	+35.8
	Thomas John Kinnear*	159	29.1	−7.6
Majority		229	41.9	+40.3
Turnout		547		

=== Skelton ===
Skelton
Party	Candidate	Votes	%	±%
Conservative	William Henry Anthony Wharton*	494	64.8	−3.0
Labour	George Hobbs	263	34.5	New
Majority		231	30.3	−5.3
Rejected ballots		5	0.7	
Turnout		762		
Conservative hold		Swing		

=== Snainton ===
Snainton
Party	Candidate	Votes	%	±%
Conservative	Francis Baker	282	56.2	
Liberal	Robert Atkinson	220	43.8	
Majority		62	12.4	
Turnout		502		
Conservative gain from Independent		Swing		

=== South Otterington ===
South Otterington
Party	Candidate	Votes	%	±%
	William Newsome Baxter*	Uncontested		

=== Startforth ===
Startforth
Party	Candidate	Votes	%	±%
	Robert Barker*	Uncontested		

=== Stillington ===
Stillington
Party	Candidate	Votes	%	±%
Liberal	Robert Souter	331	52.4	+20.4
Conservative	John Newton*	298	47.2	+6.7
Majority		33	5.2	−3.3
Rejected ballots		3	0.5	
Turnout		632	76.1	
Registered electors		830		
Liberal gain from Conservative		Swing		

=== Stokesley ===
Stokesley
Party	Candidate	Votes	%	±%
	Edward Wynne-Finch*	Uncontested		

=== Thirsk ===
Thirsk
Party	Candidate	Votes	%	±%
Conservative	Reginald Bell*	Uncontested		
Conservative hold		Swing		

=== Thornaby North ===
Thornaby North
Party	Candidate	Votes	%	±%
	William Whitwell*	Uncontested		

=== Thornaby South ===
Thornaby South
Party	Candidate	Votes	%	±%
	Charles Arthur Head*	Uncontested		

=== Thornton ===
Thornton
Party	Candidate	Votes	%	±%
Conservative	William Scoby*	694	68.8	
Liberal	T J Mintoft	315	31.2	
Majority		379	37.6	
Turnout		1,009		
Conservative hold		Swing		

=== Topcliffe ===
Topcliffe
Party	Candidate	Votes	%	±%
	John I'Anson*	Uncontested		

=== Wath ===
Wath
Party	Candidate	Votes	%	±%
	John Hawking*	Uncontested		

=== Whitby East ===
Whitby East
Party	Candidate	Votes	%	±%
	Edmund Henry Turton	Uncontested		
	Independent gain from Liberal	Swing		

=== Whitby West ===
Whitby West
Party	Candidate	Votes	%	±%
	Robert Elliott Pannett*	Uncontested		

=== Yarm ===
Yarm
Party	Candidate	Votes	%	±%
Conservative	William Hedley*	379	61.2	+9.2
Liberal	D H Hird	235	38.2	New
Majority		144	23.5	+19.6
Turnout		614		
Conservative hold		Swing		
