= John Dundas (1845–1892) =

British politician (1845–1892)

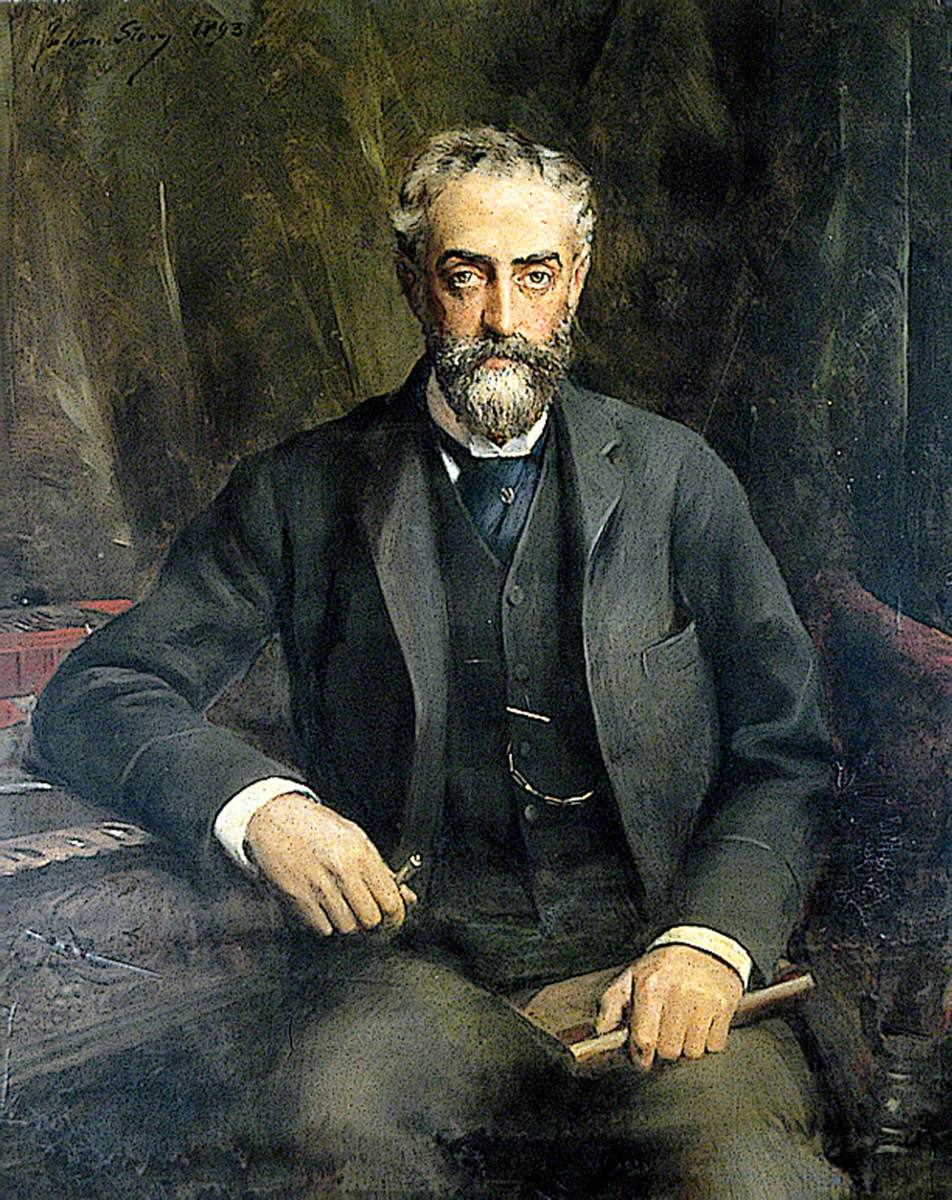
Portrait of Dundas by Julian Russell Story

The Hon. John Charles Dundas (21 September 1845 – 13 September 1892), was a British Liberal politician.

== Background ==
Dundas was a younger son of the Hon. John Dundas, younger son of Lawrence Dundas, 1st Earl of Zetland. His mother was Margaret Matilda, daughter of James Talbot, while Lawrence Dundas, 1st Marquess of Zetland, was his elder brother. When his elder brother succeeded to the earldom of Zetland in 1873, Dundas was granted the rank of a younger son of an earl, and thus styled the Honourable John Dundas.

== Political career ==
Dundas was returned to Parliament for Richmond, Yorkshire, in 1873 (succeeding his elder brother), a seat he held until 1885. He then stood unsuccessfully for the seat of York in 1886. He was also Lord Lieutenant of Orkney and Shetland between 1872 and 1892.

He was chairman of the North Riding Quarter Sessions. Dundas was elected to the North Riding County Council at its inaugural election in January 1889, and selected as its first chairman at its first meeting that April. He was then re-elected to that position in March 1892, but died before completing a second term and was succeeded by the vice-chairman, George Lascelles.

== Family ==
Dundas married the Hon. Alice Louisa, daughter of Charles Wood, 1st Viscount Halifax, in 1870. He died in September 1892, aged 46. His wife survived him by over 40 years and died in June 1934.

Parliament of the United Kingdom
| Preceded by Lawrence Dundas | Member of Parliament for Richmond (Yorkshire); 1873–1885 | Succeeded by Sir Frederick Milbank, Bt |
Honorary titles
| Preceded by Frederick Dundas | Lord Lieutenant of Orkney and Shetland; 1872–1892 | Succeeded by Malcolm Alfred Laing |
