= North Yorkshire Council =

Unitary authority in England

- Logo from 1 April 2023

Type
- Type: Unitary authority

History
- Founded: 1 April 1974

Leadership
- Chair: David Chance, Conservative since 20 May 2026
- Leader: Carl Les, Conservative since 20 May 2015
- Chief Executive: Richard Flinton since 2010

Structure
- Seats: 90
- Graph of the party split among 90 seats.
- Political groups: Administration (44) Conservative (41) Independent (3) Other parties (46) Liberal Democrats (13) Labour (10) Green (5) Reform (5) Liberal (1) Independent (12)

Elections
- Voting system: First past the post
- Last election: 5 May 2022
- Next election: 6 May 2027

Meeting place
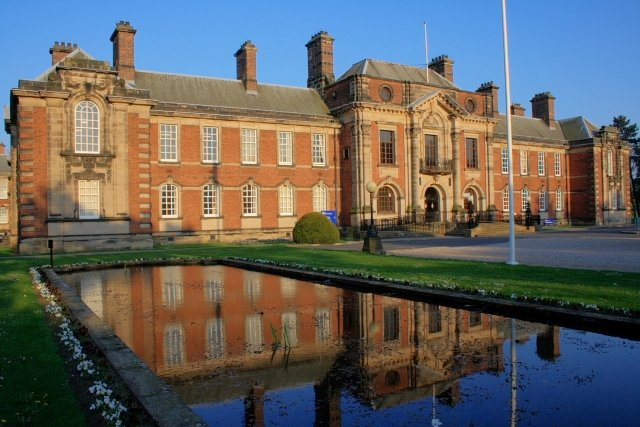
- County Hall, Racecourse Lane, Northallerton, DL7 8AD

Website
- www.northyorks.gov.uk

North Yorkshire Council, known between 1974 and 2023 as North Yorkshire County Council, is the local authority for the unitary authority area of North Yorkshire, England. The ceremonial county of North Yorkshire is larger, and includes Middlesbrough, Redcar and Cleveland, York and part of the Borough of Stockton-on-Tees. The council is based at County Hall, Northallerton, and consists of 90 councillors. It is a member of the York and North Yorkshire Combined Authority.

Since the 2022 local elections the council has been under no overall control, with a Conservative minority administration supported by three independent councillors. The Conservative councillor Carl Les is the leader of the council.

The council was created in 1974, when local government in England was reformed and the non-metropolitan county of North Yorkshire was created, governed by a county council and eight district councils. In 1996 the district of York was enlarged and reconstituted as a unitary authority, making it independent of the non-metropolitan county. North Yorkshire County Council was itself reconstituted as a unitary authority on 1 April 2023, when the seven remaining district councils were abolished and the county council took on their responsibilities.

== History ==
Logo of North Yorkshire County Council used until 2023

The non-metropolitan county of North Yorkshire and its county council were formed in 1974 from the county borough of York, the majority of the administrative county of Yorkshire, North Riding, the northern part of Yorkshire, West Riding, and the northern and eastern fringes of Yorkshire, East Riding. The headquarters of the new council was County Hall in Northallerton, which had been the headquarters of the North Riding County Council.

The non-metropolitan county originally had eight districts: Craven, Hambleton, Harrogate, Richmondshire, Ryedale, Scarborough, Selby, and York. In 1996 a larger York district was created, taking in parishes from the Harrogate, Ryedale and Selby districts, and was made a unitary authority area, removing it from the non-metropolitan county (the area administered by the county council).

A further process of reorganisation began in October 2020, when the Ministry of Housing, Communities and Local Government invited the councils in the non-metropolitan county of North Yorkshire and the City of York Council to submit proposals for reorganisation into unitary areas. North Yorkshire County Council proposed a single unitary authority for the non-metropolitan county and no change to York. The other councils, with the exception of Hambleton and York, jointly proposed an eastern council, combining the areas of Ryedale, Scarborough, Selby and York; and a western council, combining Craven, Hambleton, Harrogate and Richmondshire. Following a public consultation, in July 2021 the Communities Secretary, Robert Jenrick, announced that the county council's proposal would be taken forward and the first elections for the new unitary authority would be held in May 2022.

The reorganisation was approved by parliament on 17 March 2022. It was effected by abolishing the seven districts and their councils and creating a new district called North Yorkshire covering the same area as the non-metropolitan county, but with no separate district council. Instead, North Yorkshire County Council additionally took on district council functions in addition to the county council functions it already performed, making it a unitary authority. As part of the reforms, the county council was given the option to omit the word "county" from its name, which it took, becoming North Yorkshire Council.

A combined authority was established in 2024 by North Yorkshire Council and York City Council, called the York and North Yorkshire Combined Authority. It is chaired by the directly elected Mayor of York and North Yorkshire.

== Governance ==
Since 2023 the council has provided both district-level and county-level services. Between 1974 and 2023 the council provided only county-level services. Legally, it is a county council with the powers of a district council. Most of the non-metropolitan county is covered by civil parishes, which form a second tier of local government.

=== Political control ===
The council has been under no overall control since June 2023, being led by a Conservative minority administration with support from three of the independent councillors.

The first election to the county council was held in 1973, initially operating as a shadow authority alongside the outgoing authorities until it came into its powers on 1 April 1974. Political control since 1974 has been as follows:

North Yorkshire County Council

Party in control	Years
Conservative	1974–1993
No overall control	1993–2001
Conservative	2001–2023

North Yorkshire Council (unitary authority)

Party in control	Years
Conservative	2023–2023
No overall control	2023–present

=== Leadership ===
The leaders of the council since 1997 have been:

Councillor	Party	From	To
Edward Denison	Conservative	1974	1981
John Clout	Conservative	1981	1995
David Ashton	Conservative	May 1997	Jun 2001
John Weighell	Conservative	20 Jun 2001	20 May 2015
Carl Les	Conservative	20 May 2015	

=== Composition ===
Following the 2022 election and subsequent by-elections and changes of allegiance up to September 2026, the composition of the council was:

Party	Seats
Conservative	41
Liberal Democrats	13
Labour	10
Green	5
Reform	5
Liberal	1
Independent	15
Total	90

Of the independent councillors, three sit with the Conservatives as the "Conservatives and Independents" group, which forms the council's administration, seven sit as the "North Yorkshire Independents" group, three sit in a group with the Green Party, and the remaining two independents are unaffiliated to any group. The Liberal councillor sits in a group with the Liberal Democrats. The next election is due in 2027.

== Elections ==
Since the last boundary changes in 2022 the area has been divided into 90 electoral divisions, each electing one councillor. An election on the new boundaries was held in 2022, prior to the change to being a unitary authority. The next election is due in 2027, after which elections will be held every four years.

== Premises ==
The council is based at County Hall on Racecourse Lane, Northallerton (the building is just outside Northallerton's parish boundaries, being in the parish of Romanby). County Hall was completed in 1906 as the headquarters for the North Riding County Council. It is a Grade II* listed building. It transferred to the North Yorkshire County Council on local government reorganisation in 1974.

== See also ==
- 2019–2023 structural changes to local government in England
- 2022 North Yorkshire Council election
