= North Riding County Council =

Former administrative county in Northern England

Type
- Type: County council

History
- Founded: 1 April 1889
- Disbanded: 31 March 1974
- Succeeded by: North Yorkshire County Council

Meeting place
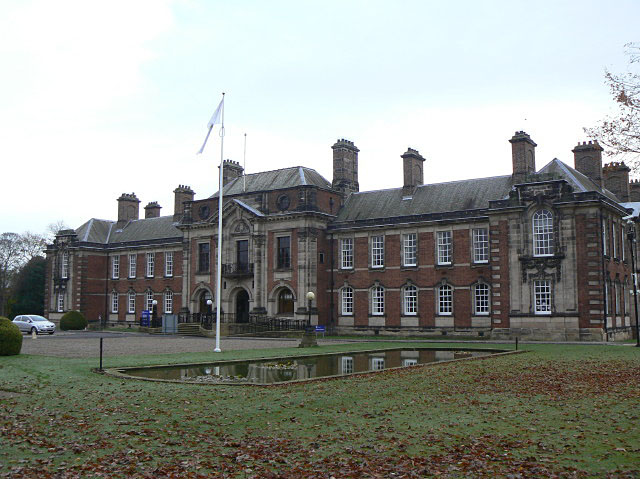
- County Hall, Northallerton

North Riding County Council (NRCC) was the county council of the administrative county of the North Riding of Yorkshire. It came into its powers on 1 April 1889 and was abolished on 31 March 1974. The council met at County Hall in Northallerton. It was largely replaced by North Yorkshire County Council, administering a slightly different area, with some responsibilities being transferred to the following district authorities: Selby, Harrogate, Craven, Richmondshire, Hambleton, Ryedale and Scarborough.

The County Council met four times per year to consider reports and authorise plans suggested by its committees. From 1889, it comprised 60 councillors elected by the public in 60 divisions; by 1968 there were 69 divisions, and after the creation that year of the County Borough of Teesside - which removed control of the conurbation from the county council – until 1974, there were 54 divisions electing a councillor each.

NRCC employed Walter Brierley as its Chief Architect from 1901 to 1923, who designed the County Hall (1906) and many North Riding schools and police stations.

== Political control ==
The county council consisted of elected councillors and co-opted county aldermen. The entire body of county councillors was elected every three years. Aldermen were additional members, there being a ratio of one alderman to three councillors. Aldermen had a six-year term of office, and one half of their number were elected by the councillors immediately after the triennial elections. This was the same in all county councils at this time, as defined by the Local Government Act 1888.

Election	Party in control
1889	Conservative
1892	Conservative
1895	
1898	
1901	
1904	
1907	
1910	
1913	
1919	
1922	
1925	
1928	
1931	
1934	
1937	
1946	
1949	
1952	
1955	
1958	
1961	
1964	
1967	
1970	

=== Chairmen ===
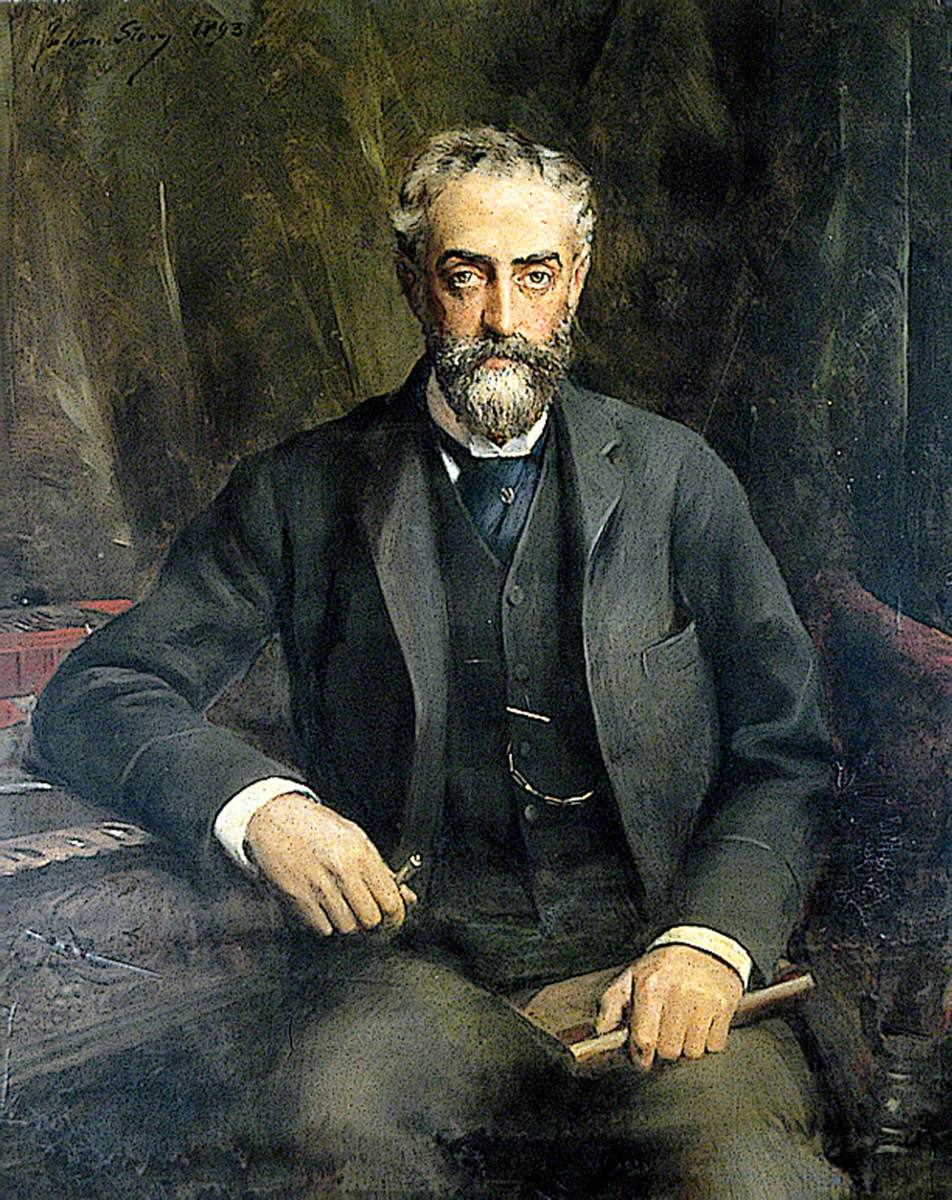
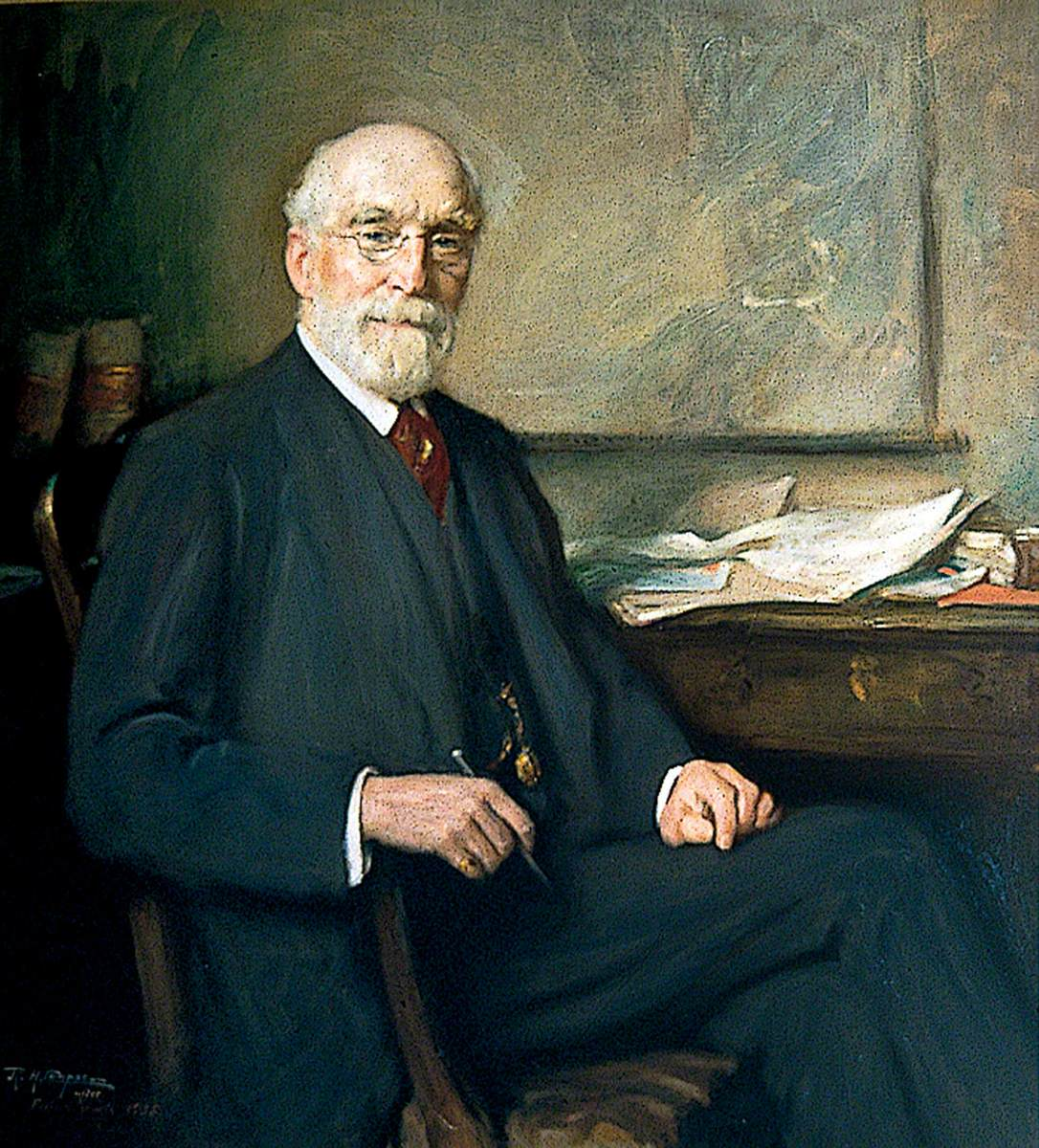
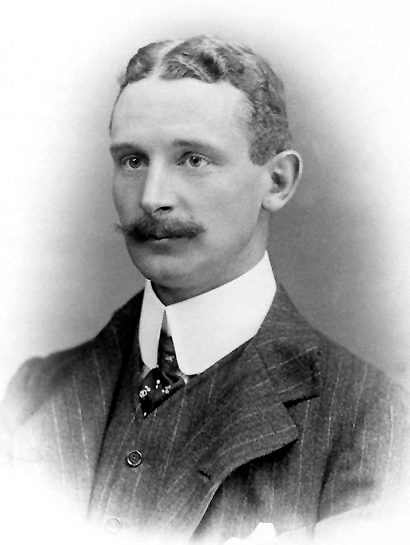
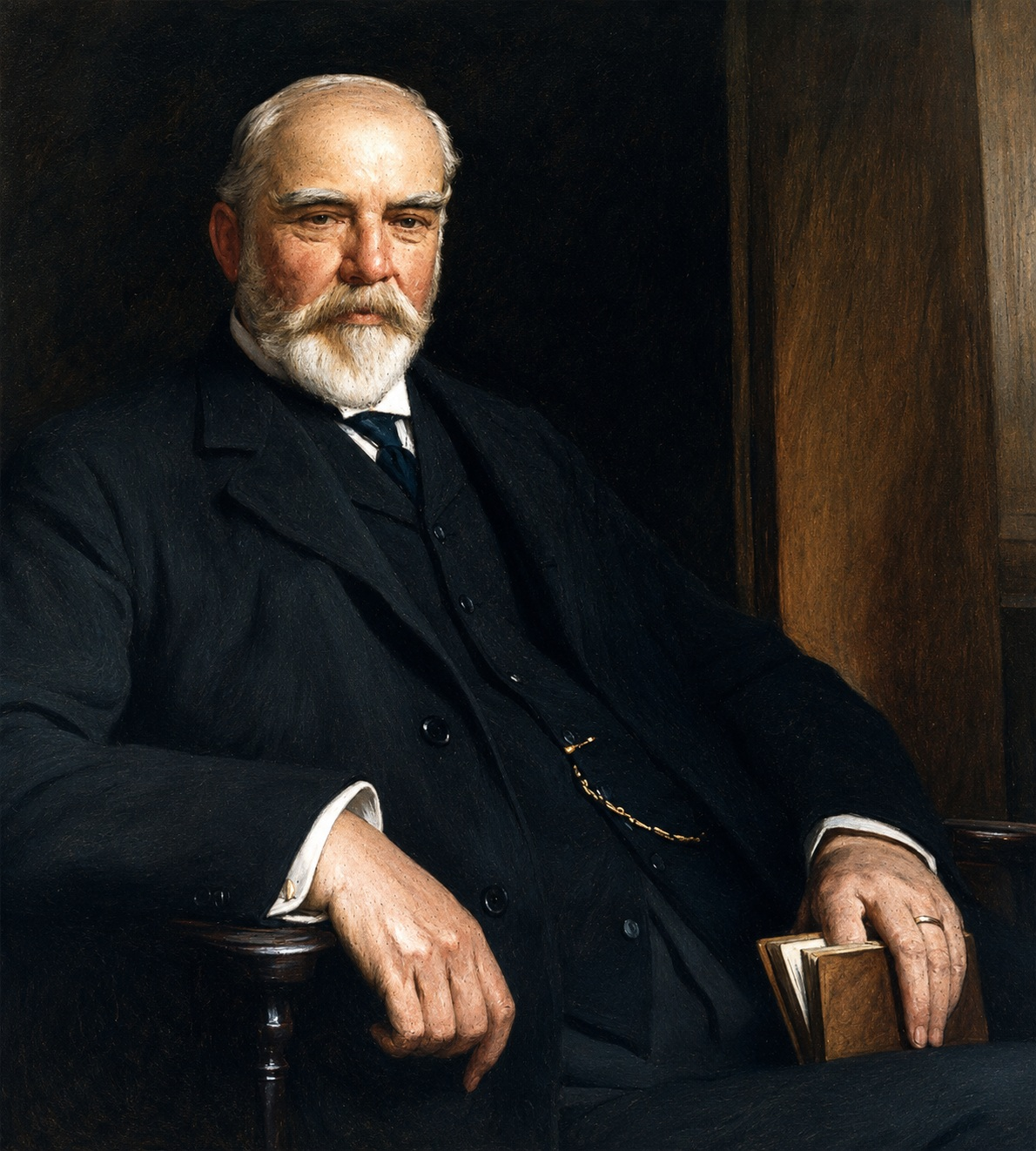
Portraits of NYCC chairmen. Clockwise from top left: Dundas, Hutton, Beresford-Peirse, Whitwell.

The Chairman was the formal head of the council, though significant power was exercised through committees. The Chairman was elected annually by the council from the members or aldermen and presided over meetings.

Chairman	From	To
John Dundas	1889	1892
George Lascelles	1892	1895
John Hutton	1895	1915
Henry Beresford-Peirse	1915	1926
Robert Bell Turton	1926	1938
William Fry Whitwell	1938	1942
Benjamin Davies	1942	1956
William Robinson Burrill-Robinson	1956	1960
James Fletcher	1960	1974

== Divisions and councillors ==
The following were all elected members or aldermen of the county council:

Aysgarth (1889–1974)
  - James Winn — 1889–1922; Alderman (1912–1919)
  - William Balderston — 1912–1913
  - John William Lodge — 1913–1919
  - Francis Sayer Graham — 1919–1928
  - George Talbot Whitehead — 1928–1946
  - Cuthbert Fenwick Abraham — 1949–1962; Alderman (1962–1967)
  - Robert William Foster — 1962–1963
  - Edward Bertram Dawson Johnson — 1963–1974
Bedale (1889–1974)
  - Henry Monson De La Poer Beresford-Peirse — 1889–1917; Alderman (1917–1926); Chairman (1915–1926)
  - Thomas Rowland Drake Wright — 1919–1922
  - Alfred Penty — 1922–1931
  - Richard Wilson Hebron — 1931–1946
  - James Hammond — 1946–1952; Alderman (1952–1958)
  - Frank Manning — 1952–1958
  - Robert Henry Bulmer — 1958–1961
  - Charles Henry Hoare — 1964–1974
Brompton (1889–1974)
  - Benjamin Wilford — 1889–1895
  - Richard Booth — 1895–1907
  - John Pattison Yeoman — 1907–1921; Alderman (1921–1931)
  - Robert Stockil — 1921–1937
  - William Lancaster — 1937–1946
  - Edwin Smith Tyerman — 1946–1954
  - John Brown Meharry Peters — 1954–1962
  - Arnold Pearson — 1963–1974
Brotton (1889–1974)
  - Thomas Hugh Bell — 1889–1892; Alderman (1892–1904, 1925–1931)
  - George Lancaster — 1892–1895
  - John Nixon — 1894–1910
  - William Nixon — 1910–1928
  - John Chapman — 1928–1934
  - John Robert Johnson — 1932–1946, 1952–1965
  - George William Simpson — 1949–1952
  - Herbert Farndale — 1962–1964
  - Gordon Joseph Yeoman — 1964–1965
  - Joseph Roberts — 1966–1974
Catterick (1889–1919)
  - William Charge Booth — 1889–1899
  - Walter Cecil Carpenter — 1899–1904
  - John Outhwaite Trotter — 1905–1913
  - Albert Smith — 1913–1919; Alderman (1922–1925)
Clifton (1889–1974)
  - James Melrose — 1889–1895
  - Thomas Snaith — 1895–1919
  - Horace Barff Brook — 1955–1963
  - Joseph Sharp — 1963–1970
  - Ian Andrew Hill Johnston — 1970–1974
Coatham (1901–1922)
  - William Eden Walker — 1901–1919
  - Thomas Hugh Bell — 1919–1922; Alderman (1892–1904, 1925–1931)
Colburn (1964–1974)
  - Lionel Reid Hall — 1964–1974
Croft (1889–1974)
  - William Wilson-Todd — 1889–1910
  - Murrough John Wilson — 1910–1921; Alderman (1902–1904)
  - Charles Henry Johnson — 1922–1931
  - William John Miller — 1931–1941
  - William Parlour — 1941–1953; Alderman (1953–1974)
  - Christopher William Drewett Chaytor — 1953–1965; Alderman (1965–1969)
  - Harold Burnett Laws — 1965–1970
  - William Drewett Chaytor — 1970–1974
Easingwold (1889–1974)
  - Henry Hawking — 1889–1904; Alderman (1904–1928)
  - Miles John Stapylton — 1904–1922, 1928–1931
  - John Robert Sturdy — 1922–1928; Alderman (1928–1951)
  - Robert Geoffrey Gunter — 1931–1947
  - Thomas Cowling — 1947–1960; Alderman (1960–1961)
  - John Alan Watson — 1960–1961
  - William Norman Gill — 1962–1974
Eskdaleside (1889–1974)
  - Thomas Bagnall — 1889–1892
  - John Robinson — 1892–1895
  - William Farside — 1895–1907
  - John Middleton — 1907–1928
  - Thomas Knightley Smith — 1928–1937
  - Robert Smailes — 1937–1950; Alderman (1950–1974)
  - Henry Atkinson — 1950–1958
  - Edward Norton Burn — 1958–1962
  - George Breckon Dixon — 1962–1966
  - Alfred Leslie Mollett — 1966–1968
  - Francis William Peirson — 1968–1974
Eston Branch & South Bank (1963–1968)
  - John Edmund Ginty — 1963–1968
Eston Central (1919–1968)
  - Thomas Marshall Scott — 1919–1922
  - Frederick Percy Clarke — 1922–1925
  - Walter Evans — 1925–1934
  - William Blendell Fairman — 1934–1946
  - Thomas Walsh — 1946–1946
  - Sarah Walby Metcalfe — 1949–1968
Eston East (1919–1925)
  - John Fox — 1919–1922
  - William Anderson — 1922–1925
Eston Grangetown (1925–1968)
  - William Jones — 1925–1938; Alderman (1938–1961)
  - Charles Edward Lane — 1938–1940
  - Gordon William Hodgson — 1940–1966; Alderman (1966–1968)
  - William Ferguson — 1966–1968
Eston Harcourt and West Central (1955–1968)
  - Benson Reuben William Barker — 1955–1959
  - Victor Henry Bell — 1959–1964
  - William Twidale — 1964–1968
Eston Normanby (1925–1968)
  - William Scott — 1925–1934; Alderman (1934–1938)
  - Robert Hutchinson Storey — 1931–1942
  - Joseph Snowball — 1942–1945
  - Thomas Murray — 1946–1955
  - Jerome Delicate — 1955–1958
  - Charles Johnson — 1958–1968
Eston North (1889–1958)
  - William Seymour — 1889–1895
  - John Glen — 1895–1898, 1904–1909
  - David Evans — 1898–1904
  - Robert Brown — 1909–1910
  - William Anderson — 1910–1918
  - Frank McKenna — 1937–1958
Eston North West (1925–1937)
  - John James Smith — 1925–1928
  - Samuel Shadbolt — 1928–1930
  - William Alphaeus Caddick — 1930–1931
  - Amelia Eales — 1931–1937
Eston North West and Tilery (1958–1968)
  - James Richard Briggs — 1958–1968
Eston South (1889–1925)
  - Elisha Beacham — 1889–1902
  - James Hanks — 1903–1910
  - John Thomson — 1910–1912
  - Robert Brown — 1912–1922
  - William Scott — 1922–1925; Alderman (1934–1938)
Eston South Bank and Harcourt (1925–1955)
  - Walter Upton — 1925–1931
  - John Kane — 1931–1937
  - Walter Evans — 1937–1943
  - Richard Ewart — 1943–1946
  - Thomas Reed — 1946–1955
Eston Tilery and Branch (1925–1963)
  - Thomas Marshall Scott — 1925–1934
  - James Finegan — 1934–1947; Alderman (1947–1968)
  - John Andrew Gavin — 1947–1963; Alderman (1963–1964)
Eston West (1919–1925)
  - Ralph Agar — 1919–1923
  - Walter Upton — 1923–1925
Flaxton (1889–1974)
  - William Abel Wood — 1889–1895
  - John Terry Petch — 1895–1900
  - Christopher Harrison — 1900–1922; Alderman (1922–1937)
  - William Wood — 1922–1931; Alderman (1931–1934)
  - George Foster — 1931–1946, 1952–1962
  - Henry James Davies — 1946
  - Irene Barbara Shaw — 1946–1952
  - John Studley Prest Walker — 1962–1967
  - Frederick Joseph Pulleyn — 1967–1970
  - Edward Alan Kitson Denison — 1970–1974
Gilling (1889–1974)
  - Samuel Rowlandson — 1889–1898; Alderman (1898–1901)
  - George Thomas Gilpin-Brown — 1898–1913; Alderman (1913–1919)
  - Norman Field — 1913–1919
  - Albert Smith — 1919–1922; Alderman (1922–1925)
  - Arthur George Ramshay — 1922–1934
  - William Hutchinson — 1932–1948
  - Robert Vernon Savil D’Arcy-Hildyard — 1949–1964
  - John Percival Hutchinson — 1961–1962
  - Maurice John Brownless Burnett — 1962–1974
Glaisdale (1934–1974)
  - John Wilson — 1934–1935
  - Ronald Murray Gladstone — 1937–1946
  - John Scarth — 1946–1964
  - Thomas Rhea — 1949–1956
  - Charles Groves — 1956–1958
  - Charles James Bowlby — 1958–1961
  - George Temple Mortimer — 1961–1970
  - Henry Williamson — 1970–1974
Great Ayton (1889–1974)
  - William Winn — 1889–1898
  - Alfred Edward Kitching — 1898–1907
  - Robert Bell Turton — 1907–1925; Alderman (1925–1938); Chairman (1926–1938)
  - Edwin Johnson — 1922–1925
  - Joseph Fry Whitwell — 1925–1934
  - Noel Kitching — 1932–1946
  - Thomas Winn — 1946–1952
  - Thomas Fletcher Cumbor — 1952–1963; Alderman (1963–1968)
  - Martin Raymond Peake — 1964–1967
  - Anne Ward-Thompson — 1967–1974
Guisborough (1889–1910)
  - Alfred Edward Pease — 1889–1895; Alderman (1907–1937)
  - George Bernal Hobbs — 1894–1905; Alderman (1905–1922)
  - Charles Turner — 1905–1907
  - Richard Godolphin Walmesley Chaloner — 1907–1910
Guisborough East (1889–1974)
  - Joseph Ramshaw — 1889–1892
  - William Charlton — 1910–1919, 1922–1928
  - George Henry Silman — 1919–1922
  - Edwin Hamerton Oliver — 1928–1930
  - William Donnison — 1930–1934
  - Thomas John Jeffels — 1934–1937
  - Joseph Barnard — 1937–1948
  - William Edward Firth — 1952–1964
  - Thomas Richard John Long Chaloner — 1964–1974
Guisborough West (1919–1974)
  - William Henry Readman — 1919–1937
  - John Edmund Watson — 1937–1946
  - Richard John Laurence Jackson — 1949–1961; Alderman (1961–1974)
  - Jack Sutcliffe — 1961–1962
  - John Morgan — 1962–1967
  - Keith Weir Besford — 1967–1969
  - Harry Bowser Adamson — 1970–1974
Helmsley (1889–1974)
  - 1st Earl of Feversham — 1889–1905; Alderman (1905–1907)
  - 2nd Earl of Feversham — 1905–1916
  - William Slingsby Hunter — 1917–1919
  - Walter Pearson — 1919–1931
  - 3rd Earl of Feversham — 1931–1937
  - Gordon Bentley Foster — 1937–1955
  - Frank Boyes — 1955–1969; Alderman (1969–1974)
  - Michael Gordon Foster — 1969–1974
Hinderwell (1889–1935)
  - Charles Mark Palmer — 1889–1895
  - John Valentine Laverick — 1894–1901
  - William Jefferson — 1901–1907
  - John Brown Laverick — 1907–1910
  - John Bruce — 1910–1919
  - William Mansfield — 1919–1922; Alderman (1925–1938)
  - Francis Thomas Marshall — 1922–1931
  - Richard Thompson — 1931–1935; Alderman (1935–1955)
Hinderwell and Lythe (1937–1974)
  - 4th Marquess of Normanby — 1937–* 1946
  - George Welford Duell — 1946–1958; Alderman (1958–1965)
  - Oswald Welford — 1958–1964
  - Thomas Manship — 1964–1974
Hovingham (1889–1919)
  - William Cayley Worsley — 1889–1895; Alderman (1895–1897)
  - William Fisher — 1895–1919; Alderman (1919–1922)
Huntington (1919–1974)
  - Thomas Snaith — 1919–1922
  - Robert James Pulleyn — 1922–1931
  - Ralph Sydney Butterfield — 1931–1937; Alderman (1937–1974)
  - Irene Barbara Shaw — 1937–1946; Alderman (1952–1974)
  - Joseph Sharp — 1946–1955
  - James Sidney Imison — 1961–1974
Kirbymoorside (1889–1974)
  - Cecil Duncombe — 1889–1903
  - George Edward Barugh Muzeen — 1902–1905
  - Charles William Ernest Duncombe — 1905–1910
  - Thomas Sunley — 1910–1922; Alderman (1922–1937)
  - Frederick George Marwood — 1921–1928
  - Vernon Harrison Holt — 1928–1939; Alderman (1939–1962)
  - Henry Slingsby — 1939–1950; Alderman (1950–1969)
  - Geoffrey Edward Shaw — 1950–1955
  - George Oliver Worsley — 1955–1958
  - Charles Frederick Richmond-Brown — 1958–1970; Alderman (1970–1974)
  - John Wood — 1970–1974
Kirkleatham (1889–1901)
  - William Eden Walker — 1889–1901
Leyburn (1889–1974)
  - Lord Bolton — 1889–1907; Alderman (1907–1922)
  - William Robinson Burrill-Robinson — 1913–1926; Alderman (1926–1962); Chairman (1956–1960)
  - Nigel Amyas Orde-Powlett — 1926–1947
  - John William Airey — 1947–1961; Alderman (1961–1970)
  - Richard McCombie Metcalfe — 1961–1964
  - John Cecil D’Arcy Dalton — 1964–1970
  - Philip Turner van Straubenzee — 1970–1974
Loftus (1889–1974)
  - George Henry Anderson — 1889–1895
  - James Ralph Tireman — 1895–1909
  - Thomas Charles Hutchinson — 1909–1919
  - Alfred Hutchinson — 1919–1928; Alderman (1928–1938)
  - Thomas Colledge Booth — 1926–1934, 1937–1939; Alderman (1939–1946)
  - Frank Read — 1934–1937
  - William Thomas Park — 1939–1946
  - Luke Senior — 1946–1954; Alderman (1954–1966)
  - William Smallwood Robinson — 1955–1964
  - Norman Lantsbery — 1964–1967
  - Alfred George Wilson Burnside — 1967–1974
Lythe (1889–1934)
  - George Pyman — 1889–1892
  - Walter Herbert Septimus Pyman — 1892–1910
  - 3rd Marquess of Normanby — 1910–1921
  - Robert Young — 1922–1928
  - Martin Young — 1928–1931
  - Alfred Headlam — 1931–1934
Malton (1889–1974)
  - Joshua Hartley — 1889–1892
  - Robert Metcalfe — 1892–1910; Alderman (1910–1925)
  - William Plowman — 1910–1919
  - John William Clarke — 1919–1930; Alderman (1930–1934)
  - Percy Lancelot Russell — 1930–1937
  - Edmund George Savile L’Estrange-Malone — 1937–1946
  - Folliott Sandford Henry Ward — 1946–1958; Alderman (1958–1974)
  - Grace Lillie Dimmey — 1958–1974
Marske (Cleveland) (1889–1974)
  - 2nd Marquess of Zetland — 1889–1895; Alderman (1895–1922)
  - Robert Charles Yeoman — 1895–1904; Alderman (1904–1908)
  - Joseph Burnip Stubbs — 1904–1915
  - Claud Edward Pease — 1915–1922
  - George Blair — 1922–1932; Alderman (1932–1954)
  - Albert Howard Waton — 1934–1951; Alderman (1951–1952)
  - William Tipling — 1952–1955
  - Norman Swales — 1955–1961
  - Kenneth Barker — 1964–1974
Masham (1889–1974)
  - Charles Edward Smith Dodsworth — 1889–1892, 1895–1907
  - Powlett Charles John Milbank — 1892–1895; Alderman (1889–1892)
  - Christopher Hammond — 1907–1922; Alderman (1922–1934)
  - John Henry Webster — 1922–1925
  - Robert Imeson — 1925–1939; Alderman (1939–1943)
  - Matthew Blaney Smith Dodsworth — 1930–1934
  - Tom Watkinson — 1939–1945
  - Robert Heddon — 1945–1946
  - Anthony Bourne-Arton — 1949–1961
  - 2nd Earl of Swinton — 1961–1974
Middleham (1889–1918)
  - Simon Thomas Scrope — 1889–1892
  - Charles James Burrill — 1892–1910
  - James Seymour Attridge — 1910–1918
Normanby (1889–1919)
  - James Glen — 1889–1904
  - Edward Upton — 1904–1910
  - James Rider — 1910–1919
Northallerton (1889–1974)
  - John Hutton — 1889–1895; Alderman (1895–1922); Chairman (1895–1915)
  - James Guthrie — 1895–1912
  - Henry Hird — 1912–1922; Alderman (1958–1963)
  - Oliver Pick Ellis — 1922–1925
  - Francis William Kettlewell — 1925–1928
  - Thomas Place — 1928–1934; Alderman (1934–1948)
  - Thomas Woodhead — 1935–1946
  - Allan Rider — 1946–1955; Alderman (1955–1960)
  - Walter Webster — 1955–1958
  - Richard Carver Pick — 1958–1964
  - John Leslie Swain — 1964–1974
Norton (1889)
  - Digby Cayley — 1 April 1889 – 29 September 1889
  - Norton was transferred to the East Riding on 29 September 1889.
Ormesby (1889–1968)
  - Isaac Wilson — 1889–1895
  - Stephen Elgar Thorrold — 1895–1898
  - Robert Theodore Wilson — 1898–1915; Alderman (1915–1928)
  - Percy Eason — 1961–1968
Osmotherley (1889–1974)
  - John James Emerson — 1889–1895
  - Thomas Yeoman — 1895–1904
  - Robert Routledge — 1904–1919
  - Charles Arthur Emerson — 1919–1930
  - Hubert Dorington — 1892–1934
  - Arthur Lowthian Godman — 1934–1948; Alderman (1948–1955)
  - Kathleen Elizabeth Mary Cooper-Abbs — 1948–1961
  - Richard Daniel — 1961–1970
  - George Thornley-Walker — 1970–1974
Pickering (1889–1974)
  - James Mitchelson Mitchelson — 1889–1914
  - George Fentress — 1914–1919
  - Arthur Kitching — 1919–1934; Alderman (1934–1938)
  - John Wilson — 1934–1941
  - Frederick William Chadwick — 1949–1962; Alderman (1962–1964)
  - Geoffrey William Preston — 1962–1967
  - George Alfred Cooper — 1967–1974
Redcar (1919–1922)
  - William Walton — 1919–1922
Redcar Central (1925–1964)
  - Arthur Fabre — 1925–1928
  - Alfred Skirrow Robinson — 1928–1930
  - Isabella Lonsdale — 1930–1934
  - James Thomas Fletcher — 1934–1947; Alderman (1947–1974); Chairman (1960–1974)
  - James William Coles — 1947–1946
  - John Thomas Walker — 1952–1964
Redcar Coatham West (1928–1966)
  - Walter Sacker Hill — 1928–1934
  - Arthur Sulley — 1934–1946
  - Joseph Coupland — 1946–1966
Redcar Dormanstown (1966–1968)
  - James Fawns — 1966–1968
Redcar East (1922–1929)
  - Benjamin Owen Davies — 1922–1929; Alderman (1929–1958); Chairman (1942–1956)
Redcar Esplanade (1925–1937)
  - William Wardman — 1925–1937; Alderman (1937–1946)
  - Isabella Lonsdale — 1937–1946
  - Reginald Kistler — 1949–1954
  - John Robert Nixon — 1949
  - James William Coles — 1954–1961
  - Gordon Timperley Thornton — 1961–1964
Redcar Newcomen (1964–1968)
  - John Thomas Walker — 1964–1968
Redcar West (1922–1925)
  - Thomas Hugh Bell — 1922–1925; Alderman (1892–1904, 1925–1931)
Redcar West Dyke (1934–1968)
  - George Cruddas — 1934–1952
  - Thomas Alexander Dougall — 1952–1956
  - Ronald Hall — 1956–1968
Redcar Zetland (1964–1968)
  - Gordon Timperley Thornton — 1964–1968
Redcar and Saltburn (1889–1919)
  - John Charles Dundas — 1889–1892; Alderman (1892–1894); Chairman (1889–1892)
  - Arthur John Dorman — 1904–1910, 1925–1934; Alderman (1934–1950)
  - 2nd Marquess of Zetland — 1904–1906
  - Thomas Hugh Bell — 1906–1919; Alderman (1892–1904, 1925–1931)
Redcar, Coatham East (1930–1934)
  - John Emmerson Batty — 1930–1934
Reeth (1889–1974)
  - Edmund Alderson Knowles — 1889–1896
  - Francis Garth — 1896–1902
  - Joseph Peacock — 1902–1919
  - Edward Cherry — 1919–1925; Alderman (1925–1931)
  - James Ralph Place — 1925–1931
  - Thomas William Brown — 1931–1934
  - Hubert Horn — 1934–1943, 1963–1964; Alderman (1943–1953)
  - Margaret Birkbeck Williams — 1944–1958; Alderman (1958–1964)
  - Thomas Sunter — 1958–1963
  - John Camm — 1964–1967
  - Joseph Sidney Fawcett — 1967–1970
  - William Tinmouth Taylor — 1970–1974
Richmond (1889–1964)
  - Gerald Walker — 1889–1903
  - Henry Forster Cleveland — 1903–1910
  - Charles Tulin Hennah — 1910–1925
  - Percival Charles Du Sautoy Leather — 1925–1928
  - Albert Morton — 1928–1934
  - James Clarkson Eyles — 1934–1946
  - Richard Botcherby Kirtley — 1949–1953
  - Richard William Waldie — 1953–1955
  - Bernard Jennings — 1955–1961
  - Thomas Gordon Bishop — 1961–1964
Richmond Borough (1964–1974)
  - Reginald Eaton — 1964–1974
Rosedale (1895–1974)
  - Robert Lesley — 1895–1901
  - Thomas Moncaster — 1901–1905
  - Henry Cockcroft Page-Henderson — 1905–1910
  - John Atkinson Shepherd — 1910–1913
  - Daniel Turnbull — 1913–1925; Alderman (1928–1948)
  - Harry Potter — 1924–1934
  - Bernard George Stenson Webb — 1934–1938
  - Thomas Walsh Tetley — 1938–1946
  - Frank Berriman — 1949–1961
  - Francis James Welburn — 1962–1974
Ruswarp (1889–1925)
  - John Stevenson — 1889–1892
  - John Henry Harrowing — 1892–1919; Alderman (1919–1937)
  - Thomas Warters — 1919–1925
Saltburn (1919–1974)
  - William Dawson Proctor — 1919–1922
  - William Henry Loraine — 1944–1955; Alderman (1955–1969)
  - Alfred Wetherell — 1955–1968
  - Edwin Victor Schofield — 1968–1974
Saltburn (Cleveland) (1922–1944)
  - Arthur Goodall Thomson — 1922–1944
Scalby (1889–1974)
  - Francis Vanden-Bempde-Johnstone — 1889–1919; Alderman (1919–1922)
  - William Henry Laycock Wordsworth — 1919–1946
  - Henry Vernon Dawson — 1946–1952
  - Harold Maude Hirst — 1952–1955
  - John Cranstoun Appleby — 1955–1960
  - Donald Harrison — 1960–1974
Scarborough Castle (1931–1974)
  - Edgar Hampton Burrows — 1931–1950
  - Norman Edward Messenger — 1952–1965; Alderman (1965–1974)
  - Peter Jaconelli — 1965–1974
Scarborough Central (1889–1974)
  - John Woodall Woodall — 1889–1898
  - Robert Aspland Marillier — 1898–1903
  - Joshua Rowntree — 1903–1906
  - John Middleton Gibson — 1906–1910
  - Sydney Peverill Turnbull — 1910–1930
  - George Rowntree — 1929–1930; Alderman (1930–1937)
  - Malcolm Rowntree — 1930–1938; Alderman (1938–1951)
  - William Arthur Farrar — 1938–1946
  - Robert Charlton Boag — 1946–1948
  - Joseph Meredith Whittaker — 1949–1959; Alderman (1959–1974)
  - Ralph Kenway Rowntree — 1959–1974
Scarborough East (1889–1928)
  - Charles William Woodall — 1889–1901
  - Frank Tugwell — 1901–1928
Scarborough Falsgrave (1934–1974)
  - Benjamin Whitaker — 1934–1937; Alderman (1937–1946)
  - George William Atkinson — 1937–1946
  - Rodney Freer Chapman — 1946–1953
  - Vernon Valentine Marshall — 1955–1966; Alderman (1966–1974)
  - George Dill — 1966–1967
  - Jack Stephenson — 1967–1974
Scarborough North (1889–1933)
  - Robert Forster — 1889–1892
  - Eden Heywood Gawne — 1892–1907
  - Samuel Charles Platts — 1907–1909
  - Valentine Fowler — 1909–1910
  - Philip Henry Craven Chrimes — 1910–1913
  - Thomas Henry Good — 1913–1922
  - Samuel Servington Savery — 1922–1925
  - John Dixon Fell — 1925–1928
  - Harry Froggatt — 1928–1931
  - John Jackson — 1928–1933
Scarborough North West (1889–1934)
  - John Greaves Smirthwaite — 1889–1898
  - Edwin Brough — 1898–1904
  - Meredith Thompson Whittaker — 1904–1928
  - William Henry Snowball — 1928–1934
Scarborough Northstead (1934–1974)
  - Walter Ernest Harland — 1934–1937
  - John William Wilkinson — 1937–1952
  - Henry Gillies Wicks — 1952–1958
  - William Legard Woodcock — 1958–1970
  - Geoffrey Hewitt Smith — 1970–1974
Scarborough South (1889–1934)
  - John Dale — 1889; Alderman (1889–1891)
  - Henry Darley — 1889–1901
  - Robert Cuff — 1901–1922, 1925–1930
  - Harry Froggatt — 1922–1925
  - Augusta Shirley Tindall — 1929–1934
Scarborough Weaponess (1934–1974)
  - Augusta Shirley Tindall — 1934–1945
  - Kenelm Henry Ernest Cayley — 1946–1952; Alderman (1952–1958)
  - Henry Dennis Tesseyman — 1952–1955
  - Lorna Auchterlonie Drew — 1955–1967
  - James Ernest McKeough — 1967–1974
Scarborough West (1889–1934)
  - Robert Peel Clarkson — 1889–1891
  - Pantland Hick — 1891–1892
  - John Stephenson — 1892–1903; Alderman (1903–1915)
  - Henry Merry Cross — 1903–1907
  - John Hall — 1907–1915
  - Thomas Francis Wales — 1915–1928
  - Benjamin Whitaker — 1928–1934; Alderman (1937–1946)
Scarborough Woodlands (1934–1974)
  - Samuel Boyes — 1934–1943
  - George Kyte Grice Pindar — 1943–1953; Alderman (1953–1959)
  - Joseph William Hardcastle — 1953–1974
Sheriff Hutton (1889–1974)
  - Thomas John Kinnear — 1889–1891
  - John Coates — 1892–1922
  - James Sefton Bickers — 1922–1925
  - Robert William Cockerill — 1925–1935; Alderman (1935–1952)
  - William Arthington Worsley — 1935–1946; Alderman (1946–1961)
  - George Howard — 1947–1955
  - Lewis Stanton Starkey — 1955–1969; Alderman (1969–1974)
  - David Rimington Tetley — 1970–1974
Skelton (1889–1910)
  - William Henry Anthony Wharton — 1889–1910; Alderman (1910–1938)
Skelton North (1910–1974)
  - Edward Hamilton — 1910–1922; Alderman (1922–1931)
  - William Mansfield — 1922–1925; Alderman (1925–1938)
  - Harry Dack — 1924–1930; Alderman (1930–1954)
  - Margaret Winsome Ringrose-Wharton — 1931–1946
  - James Frederick Graves — 1949–1973; Alderman (1973–1974)
Skelton South (1919–1974)
  - Robert Rayner — 1919–1922
  - John Thomas Allison — 1922–1925
  - Thomas Coatsworth — 1925–1928
  - James Howe — 1930–1931
  - James Henry Duckering — 1931–1948
  - Thomas Ralphland Dalton — 1949–1952, 1955–1963; Alderman (1963–1974)
  - Pearlie McPhee — 1952–1955, 1963–1964
  - William Merrywether — 1964–1968
  - Robert Brunger — 1967–1974
Skinningrove (1919–1922)
  - Robert Tyson — 1919–1922
  - Ernest Hudson — 1922–1930
  - Charles Henry Hartley — 1930–1931
  - Joseph Murray — 1937–1939
  - Peter Mountain Watson — 1937–1946
  - Thomas Bradbury — 1948–1946, 1952–1964
  - William Adamson Harker — 1949–1952
  - Francis William Fothergill — 1964–1972
  - Vincent Teesdale — 1972–1974
Snainton (1889–1974)
  - Thomas Byron — 1889–1891
  - George Everard Arthur Cayley — 1891–1892; Alderman (1897–1907)
  - Francis Baker — 1892–1910
  - John Dawnay — 1910–1925
  - Richard Dawnay — 1932–1954; Alderman (1954–1965)
  - Henry Cyril Harker Illingworth — 1954–1961
  - Francis Vernon Allen — 1961–1964
  - Stanley Arthur Bell — 1964–1967
  - John Christian George Dawnay — 1968–1974
South Otterington (1889–1974)
  - William Newsome Baxter — 1889–1894
  - John Thomas Hansell — 1893–1898; Alderman (1898–1910)
  - Edmund Russborough Turton — 1898–1919; Alderman (1919–1929)
  - Clementina Sarah Turton — 1919–1922
  - Percy Stancliffe — 1922–1925
  - Thomas Alfred Rooke — 1925–1934
  - Edward Reed — 1934–1952; Alderman (1952–1974)
  - Montagu Charles Warcop Peter Consett — 1952–1974
Startforth (1889–1974)
  - Robert Barker — 1889–1900
  - Thomas Helmer — 1900–1907
  - William Regis Claude Hutchinson — 1907–1914
  - William Britton — 1914–1922
  - James Peacock — 1922–1945
  - Norman Field — 1945–1952
  - Olive Julia Field — 1952–1964; Alderman (1964–1973)
  - Harold Boscawen Leveson-Gower — 1964–1973
Stillington (1889–1974)
  - John Newton — 1889–1892; Alderman (1892–1904)
  - Robert Souter — 1892–1895
  - Stephen Wildman Frank — 1895–1919
  - Robert Stanley Pearson — 1919–1934; Alderman (1934–1953)
  - Brigadier Harold Adrian Holdich — 1935–1952
  - Anthony Dewhirst Cliff — 1952–1969; Alderman (1969–1974)
  - Arthur George Finch — 1969–1970
  - Raymond Coates — 1970–1974
Stokesley (1889–1974)
  - Edward Wynne-Finch — 1889–1895
  - John James Emerson — 1895–1910
  - Frederick Wilson Horsfall — 1910–1921
  - James Percy Salmon Rawlings — 1921–1922
  - Isaac George Richardson — 1922–1925
  - Bedford Lockwood Dorman — 1925–1934; Alderman (1934–1950)
  - James Allen — 1934–1946
  - William Adamson Holmes — 1946–1952
  - Florence Irene Harriet Wynne-Finch — 1953–1961
  - Geoffrey Raylton Dixon — 1961–1966
  - Raymond Leng — 1966–1974
Thirsk (1889–1974)
  - Reginald Bell — 1889–1904; Alderman (1904–1922)
  - Adam Carlisle Bamlett — 1904–1912
  - Thomas Jackson Foggitt — 1912–1931; Alderman (1931–1937)
  - Montagu William Warcop Peter Consett — 1931–1939
  - John Bell — 1937–1948
  - Benjamin Foggitt — 1948–1955
  - Vera Joan Maynard — 1955–1958
  - Peter Bell — 1958–1961
  - Constance Eleanor Kenworthy — 1967–1970
  - Gerald Christopher Turton — 1970–1974
Thornaby Central (1910–1928)
  - Charles Arthur Head — 1910–1922
  - Robert Atkinson — 1922–1928
Thornaby East (1946–1958)
  - Frederick Albert Hird — 1946–1958
Thornaby East Central (1928–1968)
  - Thomas Henry Jones — 1928–1937
  - Joseph James Hall — 1937–1942
  - Edward Eland Brennan — 1942–1946
  - Joseph Walker Collinson — 1958–1961
  - John Miller Ritchie — 1961–1968
Thornaby North (1889–1968)
  - William Whitwell — 1889–1910
  - William Fry Whitwell — 1910–1925; Alderman (1925–1942); Chairman (1938–1942)
  - Herbert Edward Metcalfe — 1925–1928
  - George Ambrose Ord — 1928–1937
  - Thomas Malcolm — 1937–1946
  - John Hudson — 1949–1964; Alderman (1964–1968)
  - Peter Bonar — 1964–1968
Thornaby South (1889–1968)
  - Charles Arthur Head — 1889–1910
  - Herbert Taylor — 1910–1937
  - John Stapleton Worsley — 1937–1944; Alderman (1944–1946)
  - Frank Shepherd — 1944–1946
  - John Beckwith Burton — 1946–1948
  - Leslie Snaith Williamson — 1949–1951
  - Christopher Anderton — 1951–1968
Thornaby West Central (1925–1968)
  - Cedric Crosthwaite — 1925–1928
  - Henry Stanley Wilson — 1928–1931
  - Joseph Leo Forster McGann — 1931–1946; Alderman (1949–1952)
  - Albert Nicholson — 1961–1965
  - John White — 1965–1967
Thornton (1889–1922)
  - William Scoby — 1889–1904; Alderman (1904–1913)
  - Samuel Baker — 1904–1910
  - Richard Hill — 1910–1913; Alderman (1892–1904)
  - James Robert Twentyman — 1913–1922; Alderman (1922–1930)
Thornton Dale (1922–1974)
  - John Parkinson — 1922–1938
  - Gerard Robert Hill — 1938–1947
  - Harry Severs Burgess — 1946–1953
  - Anthony Dudley Smith — 1954–1965
  - Charles James Cawood Beauvais — 1965–1969
  - Richard Stephenson Rowntree — 1970–1974
Topcliffe (1889–1974)
  - John I'Anson — 1889–1910
  - Henry Rob — 1910–1922; Alderman (1922–1930)
  - John William Greensit — 1922–1928; Alderman (1928–1960)
  - Thomas Wheelhouse Spilman — 1928–1952
  - John Brocklebank — 1952–1955, 1964–1970
  - Ronald Luke Howgate — 1955–1957
  - Timothy Kitson — 1957–1961
  - Lawrence McCall Greensit — 1961–1964
  - William Frederick Barton — 1970–1974
Wath (1889–1919)
  - Jacob Smith — 1889; Alderman (1889–1895)
  - John Hawking — 1890–1909
  - Robert Stanley Pearson — 1910–1919; Alderman (1934–1953)
Whitby East (1889–1974)
  - James Menzies Clayhills — 1889–1892
  - Edmund Henry Turton — 1892–1896
  - John Frank — 1897–1907, 1910–1917
  - Henry James Walker — 1907–1910
  - William John Jackson — 1913–1919
  - William Aaron Headlam — 1925–1931
  - William Mackenzie Horne — 1931–1941
  - Daniel Hogan — 1941–1946
  - Henry Paylor — 1946–1961
  - Alan Palframan — 1962–1963
  - Frederick Stuart — 1963–1974
Whitby South (1925–1974)
  - Thomas Warters — 1925–1931
  - William Wray Milburn — 1931–1943
  - James Hartley — 1943–1946
  - Kenneth McNeil — 1946–1962; Alderman (1962–1963)
  - Hubert Blakeley Cummins — 1962–1965
  - Betty Mary Clark Stone — 1965–1974
Whitby West (1889–1974)
  - Robert Elliott Pannett — 1889–1908; Alderman (1908–1918)
  - Thomas Montgomerie Turnbull — 1909–1919
  - Richard Smailes — 1919–1936; Alderman (1936–1943)
  - Arthur Lough Hume — 1936–1946; Alderman (1946–1950)
  - Daniel Hogan — 1946–1953
  - Charles Procter Sweeting — 1953–1959
  - Sidney Morris George Smith — 1959–1964
  - Arthur Kingsley Thompson — 1964–1974
Yarm (1889–1974)
  - William Hedley — 1889–1902
  - John Robert Clapham — 1902–1923
  - Herbert Bainbridge — 1925–1934
  - Herbert Watson — 1934–1942; Alderman (1942–1958)
  - William Brunton — 1942–1948
  - James Beaumont Worsley Pennyman — 1949–1961; Alderman (1961)
  - Francis Hugonin — 1961–1964
  - Charles Campbell Henderson — 1964–1974
Aldermen who were never elected to a division
  - George Allanson Cayley — 1891–1895
  - Lewis Payan Dawnay — 1898–1904
  - Payan Dawnay — 1889–1891
  - Arthur Duncombe — 1891–1905
  - Arthur Fitzpatrick Godman — 1893–1930
  - Arthur Grey — 1906–1912
  - Thomas Firbank King — 1893–1917
  - George Edwin Lascelles — 1889–1911; Chairman (1892–1895)
  - James Digby Legard — 1889–1898,1901–1921
  - James Lowther — 1889–1905
  - Edward Hotham Newton — 1889–1903
  - Joseph Whitwell Pease — 1889–1895
  - James Stovin Pennyman — 1889–1898
  - James Worsley Pennyman — 1911–1923
  - William Benson Richardson — 1889–1906
  - Marquess of Ripon — 1889–1892
  - George Roper — 1889–1921
  - James Rutherford — 1889–1898
  - Albert Osliff Rutson — 1889–1891
  - Joseph Smith — 1889–1899
  - John Page Sowerby — 1889–1901
  - Hubert Gordon Thornley — 1960–1962
  - Thomas Willis — 1889–1894
  - John Gerald — 1889–1902
  - George Orby Wombwell — 1889–1892
  - William Henry Arthington Worsley — 1897–1936
  - Marmaduke D'Arcy Wyvill — 1901–1919
