= Lord Lieutenant of Orkney and Shetland =

Ceremonial officer in Orkney and Shetland, Scotland

This is a list of people who served as Lord Lieutenant of Orkney and Shetland. The Lieutenancy was replaced by two Lieutenancies, the Lord Lieutenant of Orkney and the Lord Lieutenant of Shetland, in 1948.

- James Douglas, 11th Earl of Morton 1715–?
- George Douglas, 13th Earl of Morton 1735–1738
- Thomas Dundas, 1st Baron Dundas 17 March 1794 – 14 June 1820
- vacant
- Lawrence Dundas, 1st Earl of Zetland 10 May 1831 – 19 February 1839
- John Dundas 30 March 1839 – 14 February 1866
- Frederick Dundas 7 March 1866 – 26 October 1872
- John Dundas 18 December 1872 – 13 September 1892
- Malcolm Laing 5 November 1892 – 10 December 1917
- vacant
- Sir William Cheyne, 1st Baronet 1919–1930
- Alfred Baikie 1930–1947

== Vice Lieutenants ==
- Lieutenant-General Frederick Traill-Burroughs 17 January 1900
