= Gilling West (wapentake) =

Former administrative area of Yorkshire, England

Coordinates: 54.478°N 1.803°W

Gilling West was a wapentake in the North Riding of Yorkshire. It was bounded by Gilling East to the east; and by Hang East and Hang West to the south; County Durham to the north; with Westmorland to the west. In 1831, it had a population of 17,471.

It was one of 12 wapentakes of the old North Riding of Yorkshire, and it contained the parishes of Arkengarthdale, Barningham, Bowes, Brignall, Easby, Forcett, Gilling, Hutton Magna, Kirby Ravensworth, Marrick, Marske, Melsonby, Romaldkirk, Stanwick, Wycliffe, Rokeby, and Startforth.
