= County Hall, Northallerton =

County building in Northallerton, North Yorkshire, England

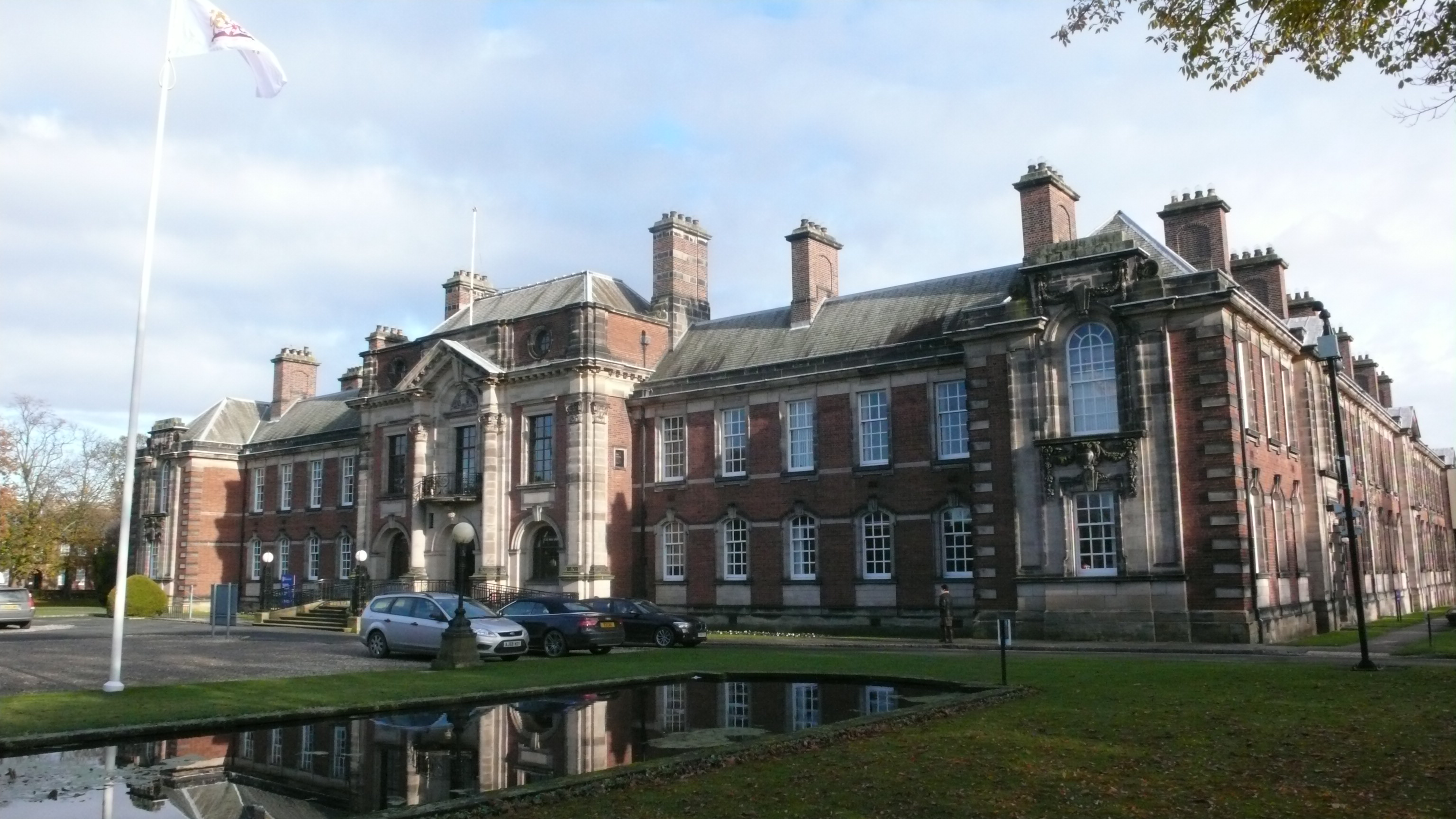
- Northallerton County Hall in 2012

- Location within North Yorkshire
- Alternative names: The Walter Brierley Building
- Etymology: Walter Brierley

General information
- Architectural style: Edwardian Baroque
- Location: Racecourse Lane, Northallerton, England
- Coordinates: 54.3329°N 1.4391°W
- Current tenants: North Yorkshire Council
- Groundbreaking: 1903
- Opened: 1906
- Cost: £33,000 (1906)

Design and construction
- Architect: Walter Brierley

Listed Building – Grade II*
- Designated: 16 June 1987
- Reference no.: 1150967

County Hall in Northallerton, North Yorkshire, England, serves as the headquarters of North Yorkshire Council and the York and North Yorkshire Combined Authority. The building was opened in 1906 and was the headquarters of the North Riding County Council until 1974, and then North Yorkshire County Council until 2023. County Hall is at the south western edge of Northallerton, in the parish of Romanby, and is a Grade II* listed building.

== History ==
Northallerton has been the administrative centre of the North Riding of Yorkshire since the end of the 17th century. Many buildings across the town were used for the various councils and local offices of the North Riding.

The land that the hall is built upon was formerly part of Northallerton Racecourse in the Broomfields area of the town. The road to the north of the building connecting the A167 and A168 roads is known as Racecourse Lane. Racecourse Lane was the finishing straight of the track and the big grandstand was located where County Hall is now. The racing died off gradually after the railway was built on its south western corner which had restricted its space. The last race meet was held in 1880; after this, the racecourse was abandoned.

As far back as 1891, North Riding County Council had recognised the need to replace their offices in East Road in the town and the twelve other sites that they occupied that were scattered throughout Northallerton. In 1895, Walter Brierley and John Demaine were employed to be the architects for the new building; however, the process of acquiring new land and the council members voting on the preferred locations, made for a protracted eight year gap before work was started. In the eventuality, the building was designed by Walter Brierley alone, who by that time was the favoured architect of the North Riding County Council. Work on the new offices started in 1903, with John Hutton MP laying the first stone in July of that year, with it being blessed by the vicar of Northallerton and the Bishop of Richmond. The hall was opened to the council in January 1906.

The external walls were made from local stone (from Whitby and Farndale), with the west facing main entrance side of the building being faced with red bricks from Leicestershire, although local bricks were used internally. The roof was finished with slate from Westmorland and the main entrance into the grounds that the hall is set in, has been described as "impressive" as it is lined with hedging, trees and decorative ponds. The interior of the building included Derbyshire Limestone, and white Sicilian and black Belgian marble in the entrance floor. When built, the council chamber was markedly different as it had Diocletian windows and a cupola that hid an early air conditioning system. The building had extra sections added in 1916, 1930 and 1940 and many other ancillary buildings were added to the site.

Between October 1914 and January 1919, part of the hall served as a Red Cross hospital helping sick and injured service personnel from the First World War. The temporary hospital had over 60 beds and over 1,600 patients were nursed during that time. In May 1941, the town of Northallerton was subject to a bombing run by the Luftwaffe. Several incendiary devices were dropped on the town, one of which caused a fire in County Hall though it was soon extinguished with no lasting damage.

In 1974, the government shake up of the counties led to a vast increase in land and population under North Yorkshire County Council, particularly from the newly transferred non-industrial areas of the West Riding of Yorkshire. It was felt that a new headquarters should be situated at York which was to be part of the new county of North Yorkshire. However, it was decided to retain County Hall as the headquarters purely on grounds of cost; it was £7 million cheaper to enhance County Hall than to move to new premises. The main building was Grade II* listed in June 1987 and was subject to a £500,000 renovation in 1999.

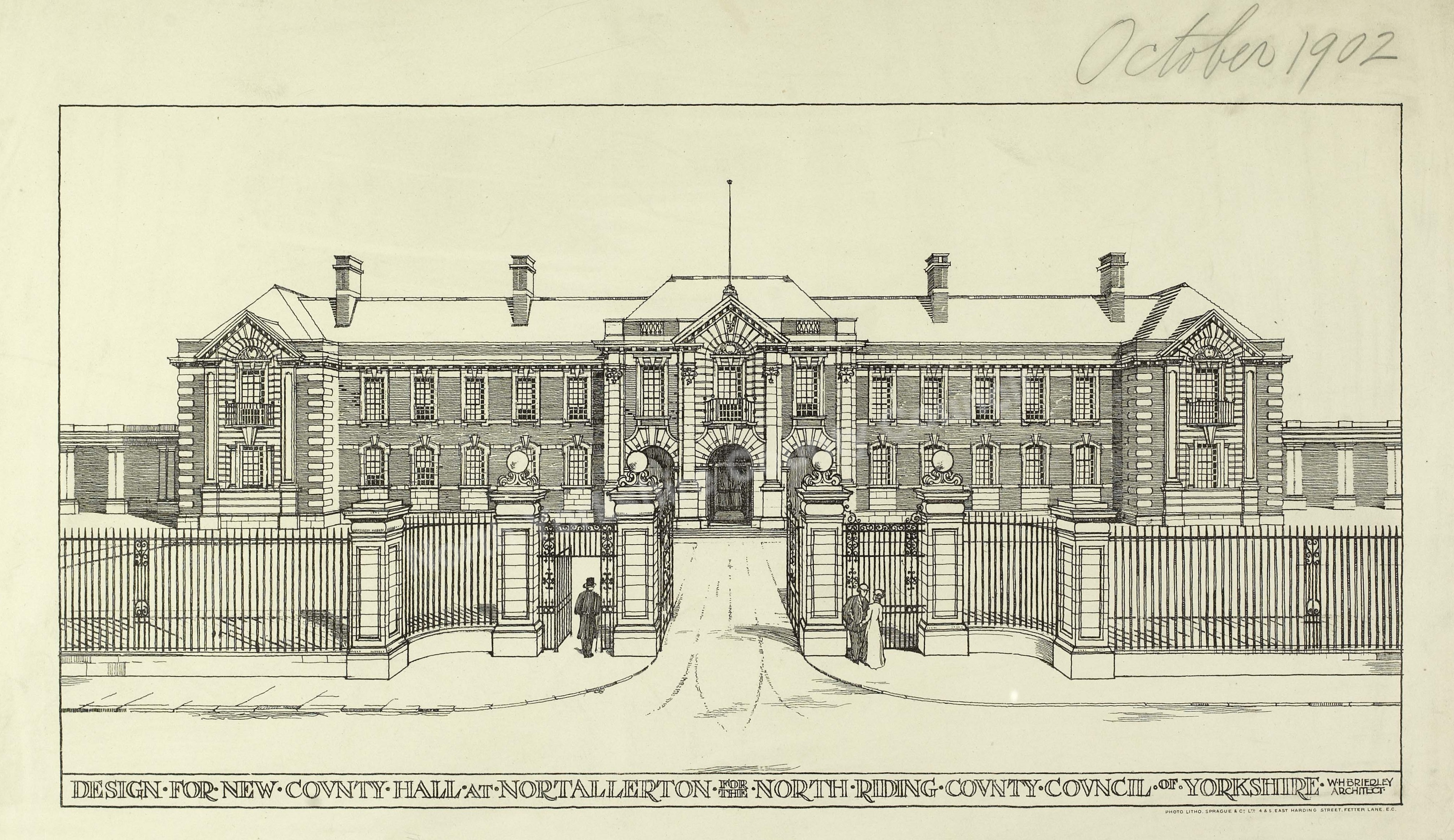
Design for the County Hall from 1902

== See also ==
- Grade II* listed buildings in North Yorkshire (district)
- Listed buildings in Romanby
