= Gilling East (wapentake) =

Ancient division of Yorkshire, England

- Wapentake
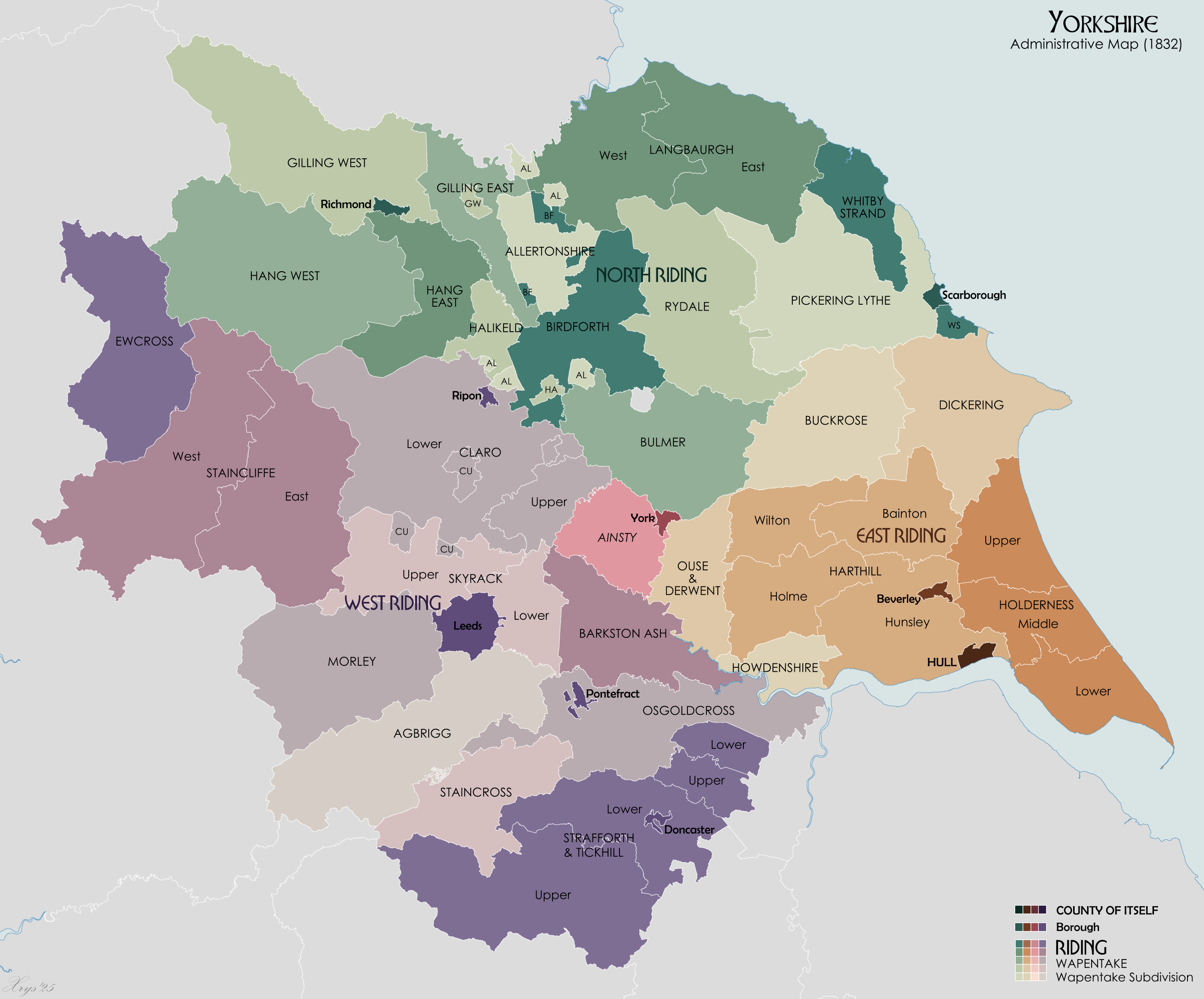
- Wapentakes of North Yorkshire in 1832

Gilling East was a wapentake of the North Riding of Yorkshire. In 1859, it had an area of 35,358 acres (14,309 ha).

The wapentake of Gilling was first recorded in 1165/6, forming part of Richmondshire. In about 1280, it was divided into Gilling East and Gilling West. The border between the two was later amended, with the divided parish of Middleton Tyas moved fully into Gilling East, while the divided parishes of Dalton Norris and Forcett were moved fully into Gilling West. Kneeton was transferred to Gilling East, while Gilmonby was transferred out. The wapentake thereafter consisted of the parishes of Ainderby Steeple, Barton, Bolton-on-Swale, Cleasby, Croft, Danby Wiske, East Cowton, Kirkby Wiske, Great Langton, Great Smeaton, Manfield, and Middleton Tyas.
