= Ryedale (wapentake) =

Ancient division of North Yorkshire, England

- Wapentake
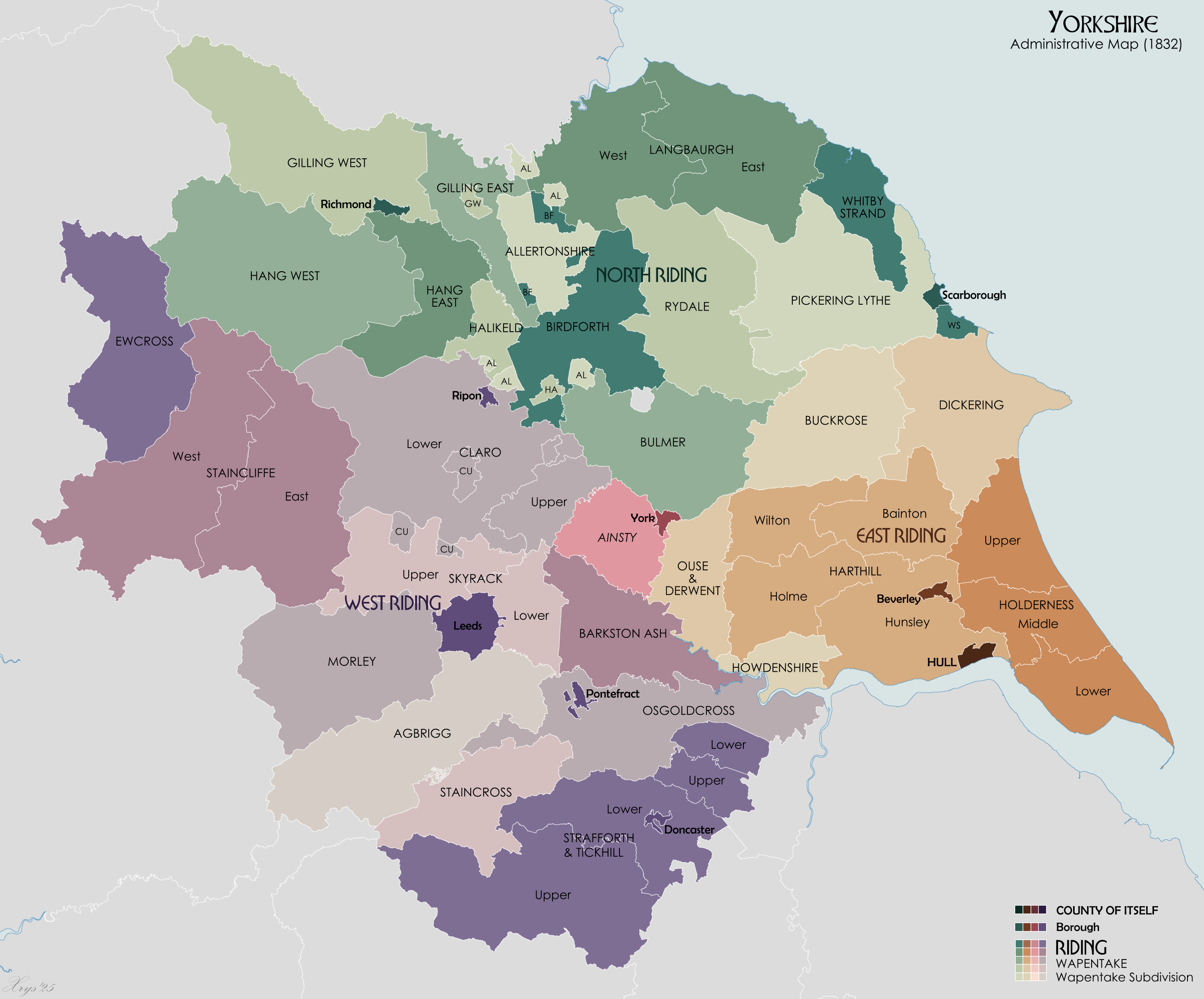
- Wapentakes of North Yorkshire in 1832

Ryedale was a wapentake of the North Riding of Yorkshire. In 1859, it had an area of 121,970 acres (49,360 ha).

In Domesday, the wapentake was named "Maneshou". It was first recorded as "Ryedale" in 1165/6, named for the valley of the River Rye. By 1284/5, Lastingham has been added to the wapentake, and Sinnington had been removed. In the 15th or 16th century, Kirby Misperton was also removed. The wapentake thereafter consisted of the parishes of Ampleforth, Appleton-le-Street, Barton-le-Street, Great Edstone, Gilling, Helmsley, Hovingham, Kirkby Moorside, Kirkdale, Lastingham, New Malton St Leonard and St Michael, Old Malton, Normanby, Nunnington, Oswaldkirk, Salton, Scawton, Slingsby, and Stonegrave.
