= Startforth =

Village in County Durham, England

Coordinates: 54.54073°N 1.93812°W

- Location within County Durham
- Population: 1,361 (2011)
- OS grid reference: NZ041161
- Unitary authority: County Durham
- Ceremonial county: County Durham
- Region: North East
- Country: England
- Sovereign state: United Kingdom
- Post town: Barnard Castle
- Postcode district: DL12
- Police: Durham
- Fire: County Durham and Darlington
- Ambulance: North East
- UK Parliament: Bishop Auckland

Startforth is a village on the Pennines end of south Teesdale, England. The population of Startforth taken at the 2011 Census was 1,361. It was in the historic North Riding of Yorkshire. Along with the rest of the former Startforth Rural District, it was transferred to County Durham for administrative and ceremonial purposes on 1 April 1974, under the provisions of the Local Government Act 1972.

It is situated south-west of Barnard Castle, north of the River Tees. Located in the village is Deerbolt Prison, a male juveniles' prison and Young Offenders Institution.

== History ==
The place-name 'Startforth' is first attested circa 1050, when it appears as Stretford. It is mentioned in the Domesday Book of 1086 as Stradford. The name means 'street-ford', and refers to the paved ford by which the Roman road which passes through the village crosses the River Tees. The Roman road in question here linked the Roman forts of Bowes and Binchester. The paved ford is still visible in the bed of the river when the water is low.

== Education ==
Startforth used to have one primary school, Startforth Morritt Memorial Church of England School, but it was closed after a vote by councillors in September 2016.
