= Romanby War Memorial =

War memorial in Romanby, North Yorkshire, England

Coordinates: 54.3327°N 1.4471°W

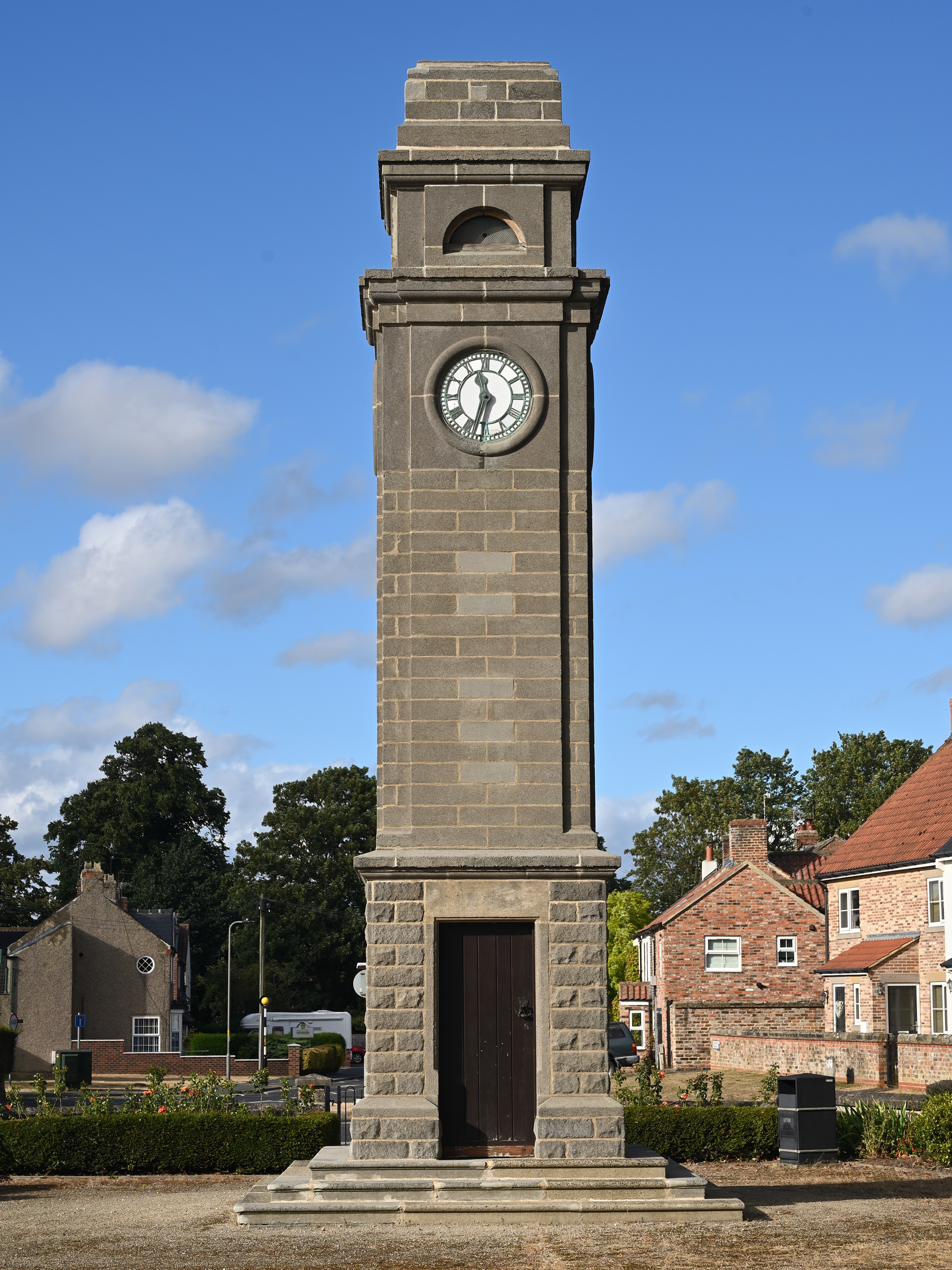
Romanby War Memorial

Romanby War Memorial is a historic structure in Romanby, a village in North Yorkshire, in England.

The memorial was constructed to the dead of World War I. It was designed by J. R. White, an architect at the North Riding County Council, and its construction cost £500. It was unveiled on 27 March 1927, lying at the junction of Harewood Lane and Ainderby Road, and the surrounding land was made into a memorial garden, which opened in 1930. Two plaques to the dead of World War II were later added to the memorial. The garden was redesigned between 2014 and 2015, and the memorial was grade II listed in 2019.

The war memorial is in the form of a four-stage clock tower, on a plinth, on three steps, and is in brick faced in stone. The tall second stage has a moulded cornice and narrow loop windows. Towards the top are roundels, two containing clock faces. Above are semicircular openings on each side, and at the top is a sarcophagus with a depressed pyramidal top. On the plinth are stone tablets with inscriptions and the names of those lost in the two World Wars. There is a wooden door, providing access to the interior and the clock mechanism.

== See also ==
- Listed buildings in Romanby
