= Black Bull =

Black Bull may refer to:

== Pubs ==
- The Black Bull, Middleham, pub in England
- The Black Bull, Northallerton, former name of pub in Northallerton in England
- Black Bull Hotel, pub in Reeth in England
- Black Bull, Ripon, pub in England
- Black Bull, Thirsk, pub in England

== Other uses ==
- The British 11th Armoured Division
- Western Cattle in Storm, a $1 postage stamp in the Trans-Mississippi Issue set
- Black Bull, an comics imprint of Wizard Entertainment
- The Black Bull of Clarence, one of the ten heraldic Queen's Beasts
- Blackbull, Queensland, a locality in Australia
- Black Bull of Norroway, a Scottish fairy tale
- Black Bull (Scotch whisky)
- Black Bull railway station
- The Black Bull (film), a 1959 Mexican film
- "Black Bull" (song), a 2019 song by Foals

== See also ==
- Black cow (disambiguation)
