= Porch House =

Porch House is the name of:

- Porch House, Nantwich, historic building in Nantwich, England
- Porch House, Northallerton, historic building in North Yorkshire, England
