= Half and half =

Name of various beverages and foods made of equally mixed parts

"Half and half" is the name of various beverages and foods made of an equal-parts mixture of two substances, including dairy products, alcoholic beverages, and soft drinks.

== Dairy product ==
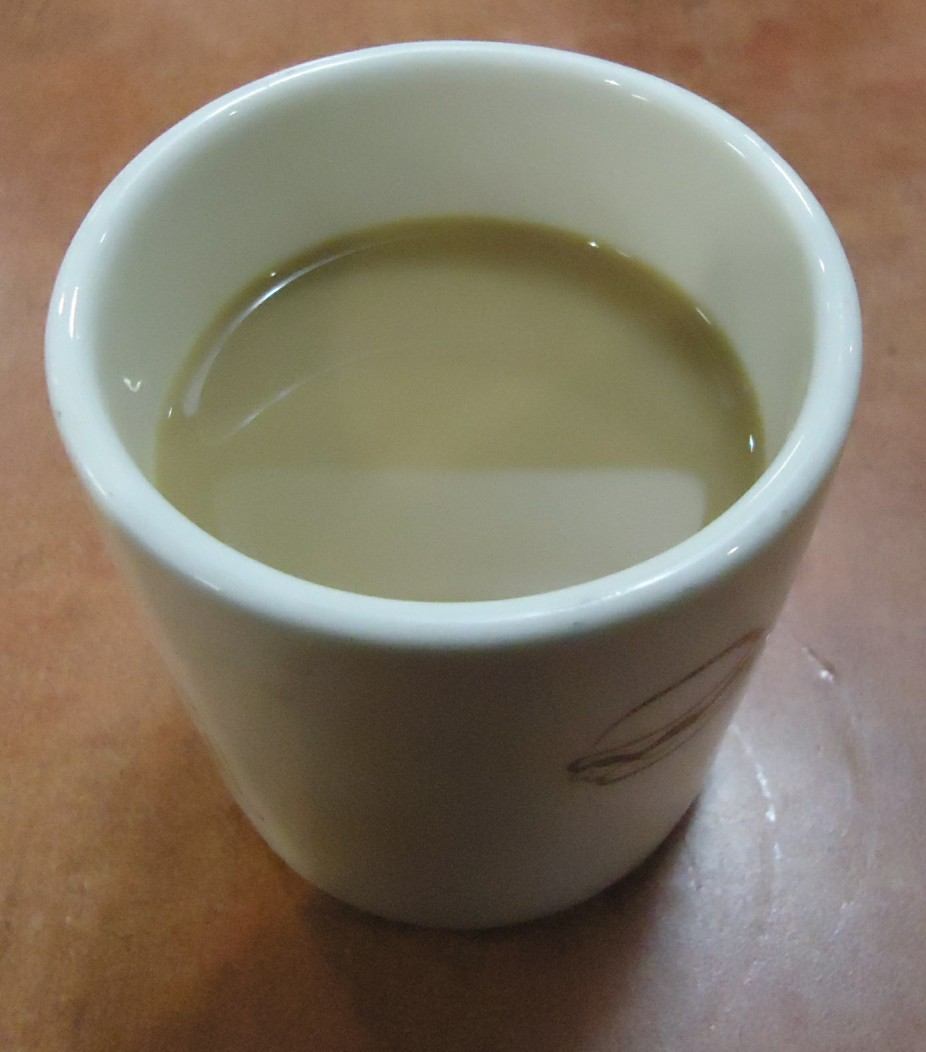
Coffee mixed with half and half

"Half and half" or "Half-and-half" is a mixture of milk and cream, which is often used in coffee and with breakfast cereals. In the United States, half and half is a common liquid product produced by dairy companies in premixed form. It was invented by William A. Boutwell of Boutwell Dairy in Lake Worth Beach, Florida, which distributed the blend regionally between 1927 and 1956.

In the United States, half-and-half must contain between 10.5 and 18 percent milkfat. It is pasteurized or ultra-pasteurized, and may be homogenized.

The following optional ingredients may also be used:

1. Emulsifiers
2. Stabilizers
3. Nutritive sweeteners
4. Characterizing flavoring ingredients (with or without coloring) as follows:
  1. Fruit and fruit juice (including concentrated fruit and fruit juice).
  2. Natural and artificial food flavoring.

=== Milkette ===
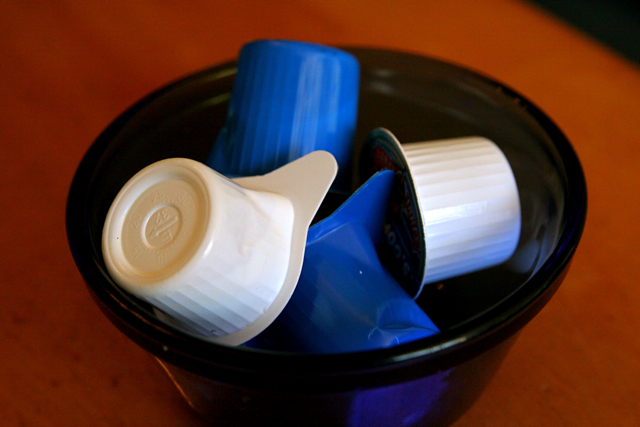
Coffee creamer in milkette containers

A milkette (also referred to as dairy milker, creamette or creamers) is a single serving of milk (2%) or cream (10% and 18%) in 12 millilitres (0.42 imp fl oz; 0.41 US fl oz) or 15 millilitres (0.53 imp fl oz; 0.51 US fl oz) containers used for coffee and tea. The single cup of milk is stored in a sealed (foil cover) plastic cup of milk or cream with long shelf life.

== Alcoholic beverages ==
=== Belgium ===
In some cafés in Brussels, a "half en half", Dutch for "half and half", is a mixture of white wine and champagne. Originally, it was a mixture of two different typical beer types from Brussels: 50% lambic and 50% faro.

=== Denmark ===
A "half and half" as ordered in a Copenhagen bar is a mixture of dark beer and pilsner (lager). The dark beer is a Danish version of an Imperial stout-type beer; in Denmark simply called "porter", which is a little sweeter than a Guinness.

=== Ireland, England and North America ===
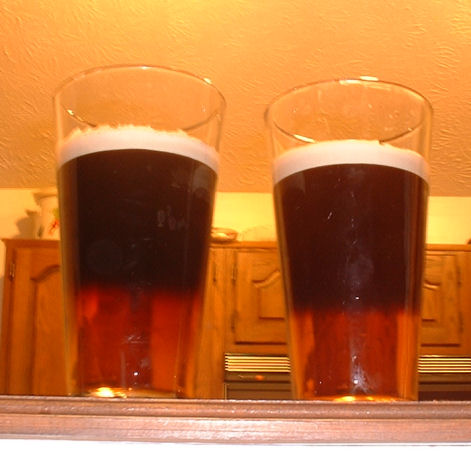
Black and Tan drinks are prepared with a blend of Guinness stout and Bass pale ale

In Britain, a half and half may mean a mixture of mild ale and bitter.

In the North East of England, a request for a half and half would more commonly produce a combination of Scotch ale and India pale ale (IPA). This drink fell from favour when the Scottish & Newcastle brewery was obliged to sell many of their tied public houses and McEwan's Scotch and IPA disappeared from public bars across the North East.

In Canada and the United States, Black and Tan refers to Guinness and a lager or ale that will support the Guinness, most commonly Bass Ale, although some Irish-themed bars shun the term for its association with the Royal Irish Constabulary's "Black and Tans" force. A Half and Half is Guinness and Harp. A Guinness and Smithwick's is a Blacksmith.

=== Scotland ===
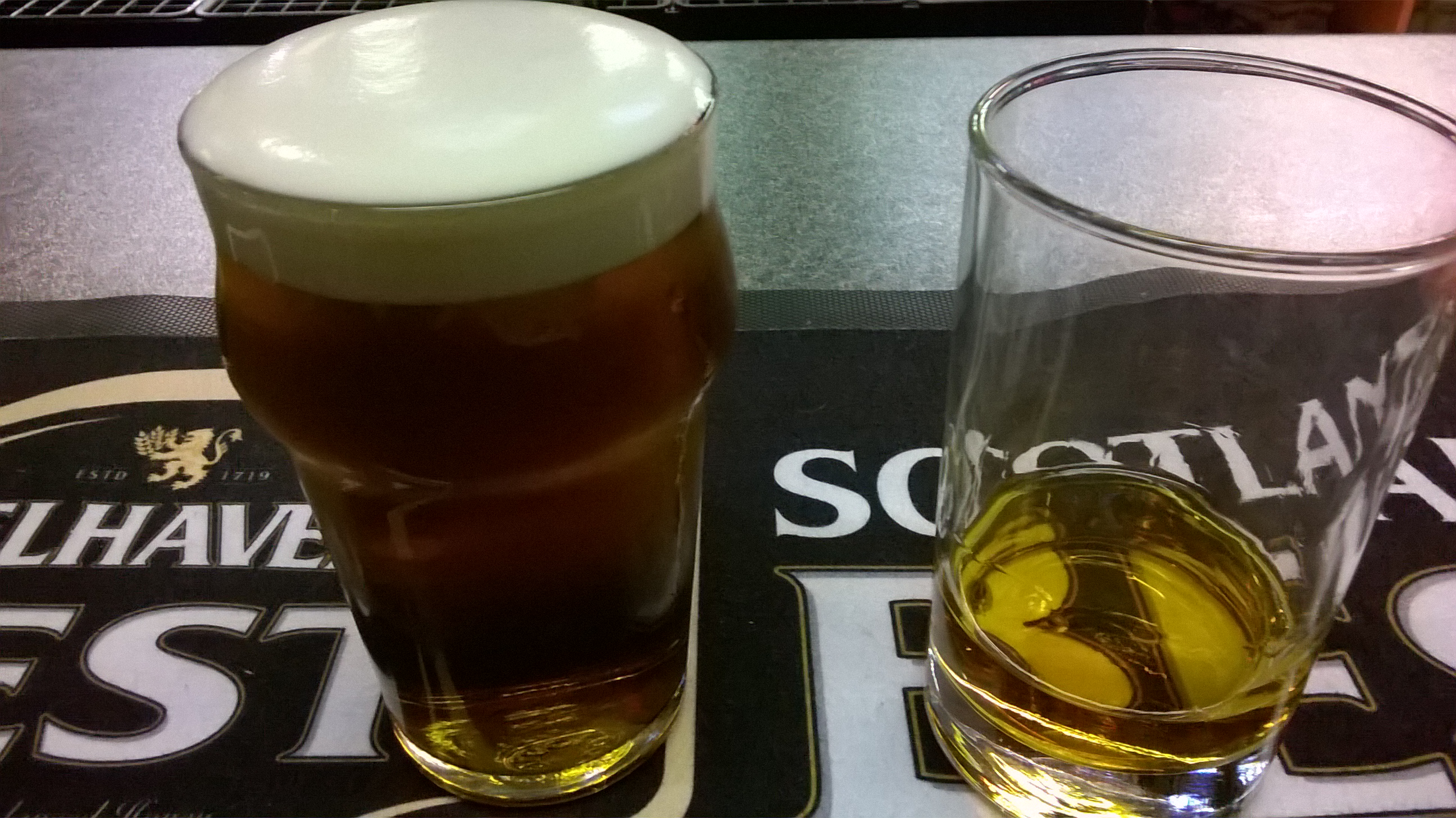
A "hauf an a hauf", in Scots

In Scotland, a "hauf an a hauf" (half and a half) is a "wee hauf" glass of whisky (one-quarter gill, 36 ml) and one-half imperial pint (280 ml) of beer as a chaser.

=== Bosnia and Herzegovina, Croatia, Montenegro, Serbia, Macedonia ===
"Pola pola" ("half and half") is a slang term for the drink spritzer, made out of equal parts of white wine or rosé wine and carbonated water. Different ratios of wine and carbonated water are named with various slang terms, depending on the region. "Pola pola" is also known as "litra i voda" (one bottle of wine and one bottle of carbonated water), as well as "Litar-litar" (as in 1 liter of wine, 1 liter of water) and "Gemišt".

=== Switzerland ===
In Switzerland, and more particularly in Valais, a half & half is a mixture of dry and sweet liquor of the same fruit. In the canton of Geneva, a "moitié-moitié" generally refers to a digestif containing one half Williamine liqueur and one half Williamine eau-de-vie. In the canton of Ticino, a mezz e mezz (literally half and half in the local Ticinese dialect) refers to a mixture of one half local Merlot wine and one half gazosa (a local lemon-flavoured carbonated soft drink).

=== Uruguay ===
In Uruguay there's a beverage called "Medio y Medio" ("half and half") that consists of sweet sparkling wine and dry white wine in equal parts. "Medio y medio" comes in Red, Rosé and White varieties, the latter being the original and most popular. It is massively consumed during the holidays but it can be found in certain places throughout the year as well. The most common "Medio y Medio" is the one produced by Roldós, a local restaurant that claims to have invented the mixture.

"Medio y medio" is also the name for another cocktail, made with White Vermouth and "Caña" (literally "cane"), a 35–50% alcoholic beverage distilled from sugar cane. This name, however, is used not in the majority of bars but only in the most traditional ones, probably due to the existence of Roldós' "Medio y Medio".

== Non-alcoholic beverages ==
=== Canada and the United States ===
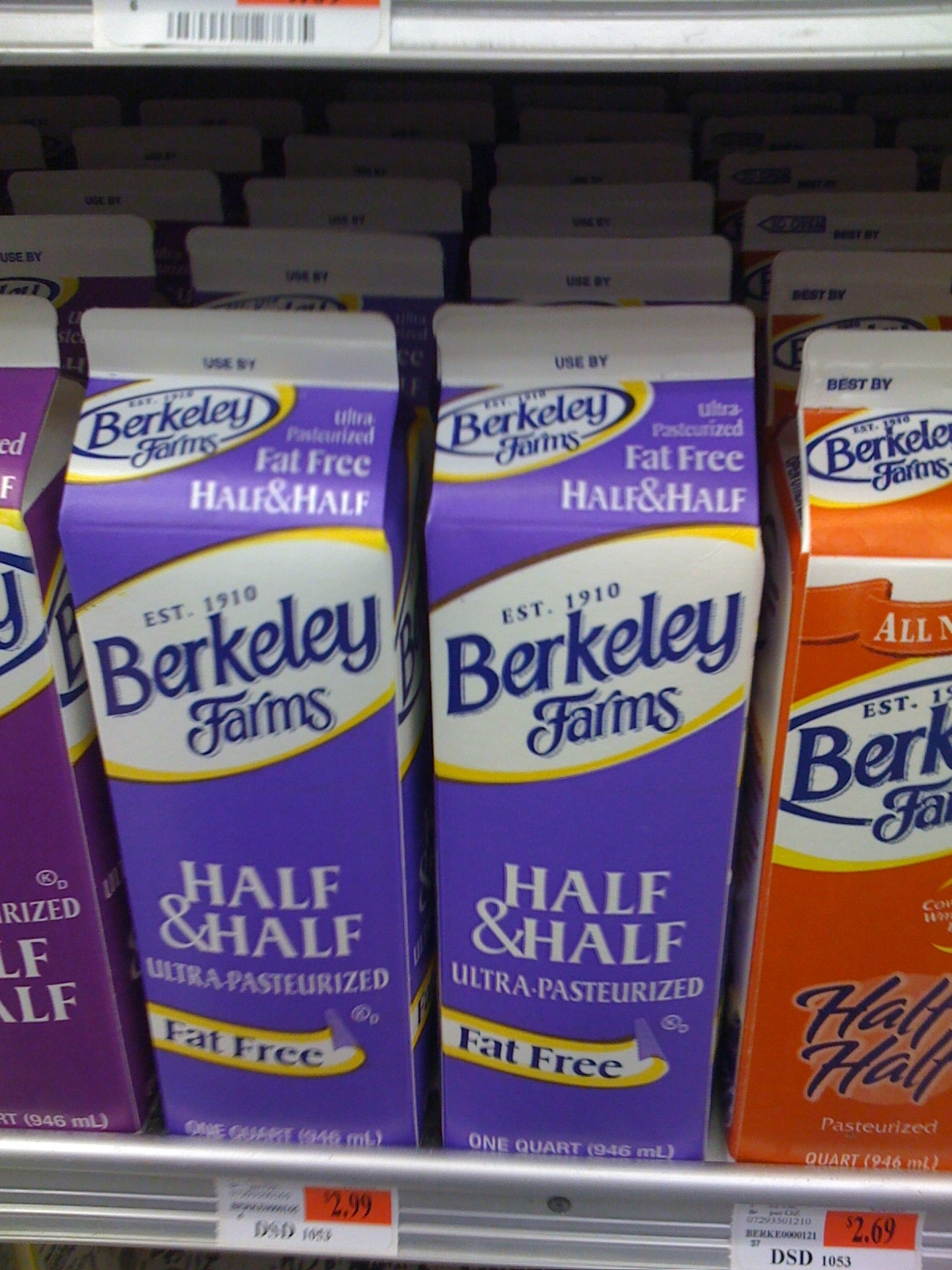
Cartons of half and half at a grocery store in California

In Canada and the United States, half and half almost always refers to a light cream typically used in coffee. (See above.) The name refers to the liquid's content of half milk and half cream. It is widely available in the United States, both in individual-serving containers and in bulk. It is also used to make ice cream. Non-fat versions of the product are also available, containing corn syrup and other ingredients. This half and half can be also used to make a dirty soda.

In addition to the light coffee cream, half and half can refer to other drinks in some regions of the U.S. A half and half of iced tea and lemonade is popular in the Northeastern United States. It consists of one part iced tea, sweetened, unsweetened or both, and one part lemonade served over ice. This drink is also called an Arnold Palmer, named for an American golfer, but that drink more correctly is mostly tea with one-quarter to one-third lemonade.

In the Southern United States (specifically the cities of Atlanta and Houston), "half and half" may also refer to a mixture of half sweet and half unsweetened iced tea.

Some coffee shops in colder climates serve a half and half drink consisting of half coffee and half hot chocolate, similar to caffè mocha. Half and half might also refer to a flavor of soda that combines the flavors of grapefruit and lemon.

=== Switzerland ===
In the Romandy, a moitié-moitié (lit. half-half) can refer to coffee mixed with an equal amount of milk..

In the German-speaking part of Switzerland, especially in the north-eastern part, a mixture of apple and orange juice is known as "halb halb" ("half half", sometimes written 1+1).

== Food ==
=== Netherlands ===
"Half-om-halfgehakt" (half for half minced meat) is commonly used for mixed minced meat, made of equal amounts of beef and pork. The term "Gehacktes halb und halb" is used in Germany, also referring to minced meat.

=== Switzerland ===
Moitié-moitié (lit. half-half) refers to a cheese fondue made with half Gruyère and half Vacherin Fribourgeois.

=== Sweden ===
In the Skaraborg region of Sweden "Hälta Hälta" ("Half Half" in the local dialect) refers to a serving of half french fries and half mashed potato, commonly served with sausage.

=== United States ===
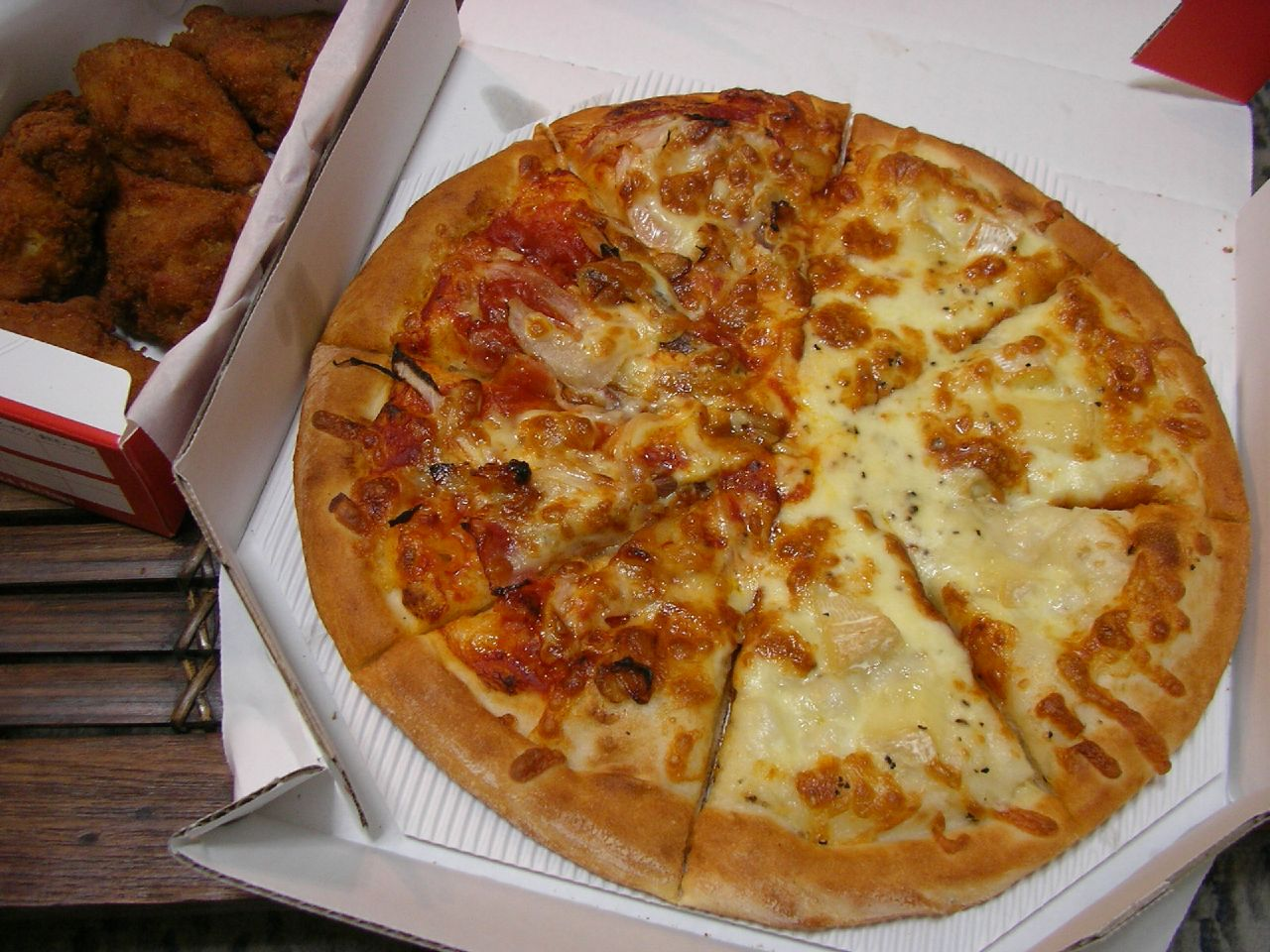
A half and half pizza

Black and white cookies are sometimes called half-and-half cookies

A half-and-half pizza is one prepared with different toppings on each side of the pizza.

=== British Isles ===
A half and half is commonly understood to be a side dish of half chips and half rice. The term is used across the British Isles but most commonly in the north of England and Wales. A typical order might be "chicken curry half and half" or "chili con carne half and half".

== See also ==
- Black cow (disambiguation)
