= St James' Church, Romanby =

Church in North Yorkshire, England

Coordinates: 54°19′59″N 1°26′51″W

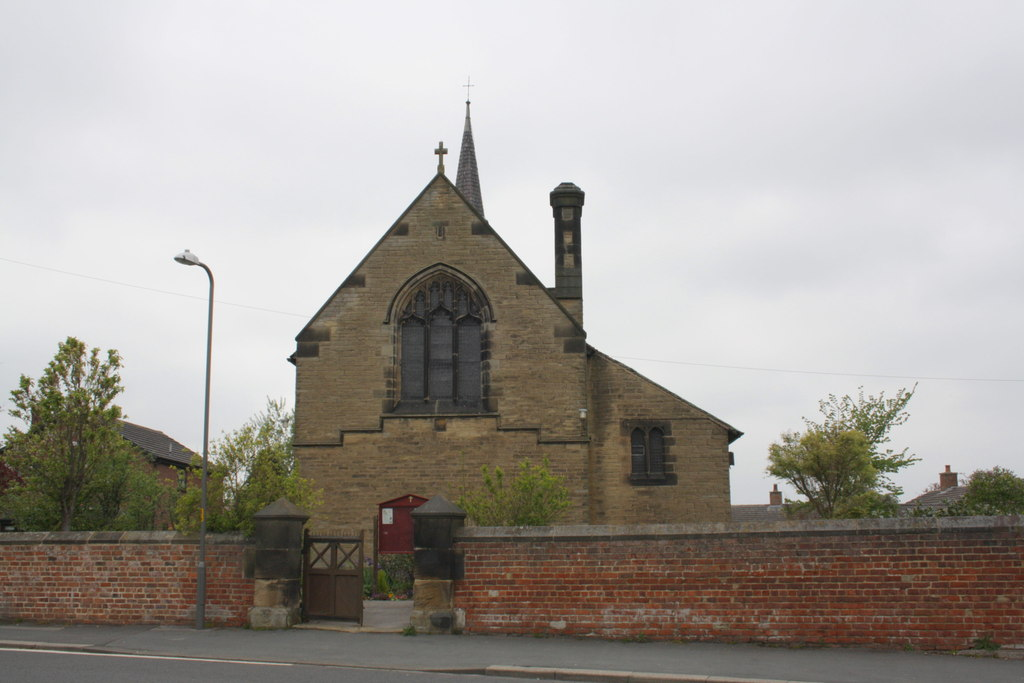
The church, in 2012

St James' Church is the parish church of Romanby, a village in North Yorkshire, in England.

Romanby was long in the parish of All Saints' Church, Northallerton; a chapel of ease was constructed in the village in 1231, but it was closed and demolished in 1523. Between 1880 and 1882, a church was built in Romanby, to a design by Charles Hodgson Fowler. It is in the Gothic revival style, and on completion could seat 197 worshippers. George Pace undertook repairs to the building in 1965 and 1966, and also designed its candlesticks and a new cross for the apex. The building was grade II listed in 2000.

The church is built of stone with tile roofs. It consists of a nave and a chancel in one unit, with a lean-to vestry. At the junction of the nave and the chancel is a bellcote with a slate-hung base and an octagonal spire. On the north side is a projecting gabled porch containing an arched doorway with a chamfered and moulded surround. Inside, it has an octagonal stone font.

== See also ==
- Listed buildings in Romanby
