= Listed buildings in Northallerton =

Northallerton is a civil parish in the county of North Yorkshire, England. It contains 66 listed buildings that are recorded in the National Heritage List for England. Of these, one is listed at Grade I, the highest of the three grades, one is at Grade II*, the middle grade, and the others are at Grade II, the lowest grade. The parish contains the market town of Northallerton and the surrounding area. Most of the listed buildings are houses, cottages and associated structures, shops and offices. The others include churches, a hotel and public houses, a workshop, a former police station, converted parts of a former prison, and a town hall.

== Key ==
Grade	Criteria
I	Buildings of exceptional interest, sometimes considered to be internationally important
II*	Particularly important buildings of more than special interest
II	Buildings of national importance and special interest

== Buildings ==
Name and location	Photograph	Date	Notes	Grade
All Saints' Church; 54.34203°N 1.43665°W		12th century	The church has been altered and extended through the centuries, including a restoration and replacement of the chancel between 1882 and 1885 by C. Hodgson Fowler. The church is built in sandstone, and has roofs of Westmorland slate and lead. It has a cruciform plan, consisting of a nave, north and south aisles, a south porch, north and south transepts, a chancel with a north vestry, and a tower at the crossing. The tower has clasping buttresses, paired bell openings with hood moulds, a clock face on the north side, and a parapet with eight pinnacles and triangular merlons. There are crocketed pinnacles on the body of the church, and the chancel has an embattled parapet.	I
The Fleece Inn; 54.34058°N 1.43425°W		15th century (probable)	A house, later a public house, in sandstone, with timber framing on the gables, and a pantile roof. There are two storeys and attics, a gabled wing on the left, a projecting gabled cross-wing to the right, and a left rear wing. On the left is a two-storey square bay window with casement windows and a tile roof. In the centre is a porch, and to the right is a two-storey square bay window containing mullioned windows, and with a tiled hipped roof. The gables also contain mullioned windows.	II
Porch House and railings 54.34215°N 1.43568°W		Late 16th century	The house, which has been much altered and extended, has a timber framed core, it is enclosed in brick, and has a pantile roof. There are two storeys, a range of four bays, and a projecting cross-wing on the left with a hipped roof. In the centre of the main range is a single-storey sandstone porch containing a doorway with an ogee-shaped lintel, and a coped gable with a finial. The windows are a mix of horizontally-sliding sashes and casements. The cross-wing contains a two-storey canted bay window and a doorway to the right. In front of the house are wrought iron railings on a low wall.	II
145 High Street; 54.33689°N 1.43355°W		Late 17th century (probable)	Two cottages combined into one shop, it is rendered, with an eaves band and a pantile roof. There are two storeys and two bays. On the ground floor on the left is a canted bay window, and to the right are a doorway with a classical surround, a horizontally-sliding sash window, and another doorway. The upper floor contains horizontally-sliding sash windows. On the right return is a cruck truss with a saddle and a high collar extended out towards the front.	II
208, 209 and 210 High Street; 54.34028°N 1.43483°W	—	Late 17th century	An inn, later converted into shops, it is rendered, and has a Welsh slate roof with stone coping on the right. There are three storeys and five bays. On the left of the ground floor is a doorway and a long shopfront, and the right two bays contain a central doorway flanked by canted bay windows. On the middle floor, the central bay contains a sash window, in each of the other bays is a bay window, and over the doorway is the frame for an inn sign on consoles. The top floor contains sash windows.	II
104 and 105 High Street; 54.33957°N 1.43388°W		Late 17th or early 18th century	An inn, much altered, and later two shops, roughcast, with a dentilled eaves course and a pantile roof. The left shop has three storeys and three bays, and the right shop has two storeys and one bay, both with the same roof line. At the rear is a three-storey wing with stepped eaves. The ground floor contains shopfronts. On the upper floors, the left shop has sash windows, and the right shop has one large casement window.	II
78 High Street; 54.34132°N 1.43476°W	—	Early 18th century	A house later used for other purposes, it is rendered, and has a pantile roof with a shaped kneeler and stone coping. There are two storeys and seven bays. In the left bay is a basket-arched passage doorway with a quoined surround, and elsewhere there are sash windows.	II
Rear wing behind 115 High Street; 54.33900°N 1.43329°W	—	Early 18th century	Houses, later offices, in brown brick, with an eaves band, and a pantile roof with a shaped kneeler and stone coping on the right. There are two storeys and six bays. On the front are doorways with quoined surrounds and keystones, a canted bay window, and sash windows. On the rear is a doorway with a Tuscan doorcase and a fanlight.	II
171 and 172 High Street; 54.33816°N 1.43398°W		Early 18th century	A house, later a shop, it is rendered and has a cornice, and a pantile roof with a shaped kneeler and stone coping on the left. There are three storeys and five bays. On the ground floor is a shopfront, and the upper floors contain sash windows with stone sills and lintels with keystones.	II
214 High Street; 54.34055°N 1.43492°W	—	Early 18th century	A house, later a shop, with a long range of four cottages at the rear. The shop is in painted brick with a Welsh slate roof, and has three storeys and two bays. On the ground floor is a shopfront with a passage door to the left, and the upper floors contain sash windows. The cottages are in brown brick with pantile roofs, and have two storeys and two bays. Each cottage has a doorway and sash windows.	II
219 High Street; 54.34085°N 1.43504°W	—	Early 18th century	A house on a corner site, later a shop and office, in brown brick, with a dentilled cornice, oversailing eaves on flat brackets with rosettes, and a Welsh slate roof. There are three storeys and three bays, and a lower rear wing. On the ground floor is a shopfront, and the upper floors contain sash windows in architraves, those on the middle floor also with pulvinated friezes and cornices.	II
The Nags Head; 54.33692°N 1.43354°W		Early 18th century (probable)	The public house is rendered, and has a string course and a pantile roof. There are two storeys, three bays, and a rear wing on the left. The main doorway has pilasters, a frieze and a cornice, and there is a doorway to the right with a plain surround. The ground floor windows are tripartite, and on the upper floor are small sash windows.	II
88 High Street; 54.34064°N 1.43426°W	—	Early to mid-18th century	A house, later used for other purposes, in brown brick, with quoins, a floor band, a moulded cornice, and a tile roof with shaped kneelers and stone coping. There are three storeys, three bays and a rendered rear wing. On the ground floor is a shop window and a recessed doorway to the left. The windows on the middle floor are sashes, on the top floor they are casements, and all have flat brick arches and keystones.	II
102 and 103 High Street; 54.33967°N 1.43392°W		Early to mid-18th century	A house, later two shops, in grey-orange brick, with stone quoins, an eaves cornice with a Greek key band, and a pantile roof with stone coping and kneelers. There are three storeys, seven bays, two short gabled rear wings, and a single-storey rear extension. On the ground floor are shopfronts, and the upper floors contain sash windows with tripartite keystones.	II
106 High Street; 54.33948°N 1.43384°W		Early to mid-18th century	An inn, later a shop, it is rendered, and has a Welsh slate roof with shaped kneelers and stone coping. There are three storeys and three bays. On the ground floor is a shopfront, the middle floor contains sash windows with decorated keystones, and on the top floor are casement windows with keystones.	II
184 High Street; 54.33884°N 1.43417°W		Early to mid-18th century	A house, later a shop, in brown brick with dentilled eaves and a pantile roof. There are three storeys and one bay. On the ground floor is a shopfront, and the upper floors contain sash windows.	II
188 High Street; 54.33904°N 1.43423°W		Early to mid-18th century	A house, later a shop, in painted brick, with a cornice and an artificial stone slate roof. There are three storeys and three bays, and a gabled rear wing. On the ground floor is a shopfront, and the upper floors contain sash windows with keystones.	II
189A High Street; 54.33920°N 1.43428°W		Early to mid-18th century	A bank, later a restaurant, it is rendered, and has rusticated quoins, a sill band, a modillion cornice, and a hipped Welsh slate roof. There are three storeys and five bays. The central doorway has panelled pilasters, a fanlight, and an open pediment on consoles. It is flanked by canted bay windows containing sash windows divided by pilasters, and with a fluted frieze and a lead roof. The upper floors contain sash windows with keystones. At the rear are extensive additions.	II
206 High Street; 54.34011°N 1.43477°W		Early to mid-18th century	A public house, later a shop, it is rendered, and has rusticated quoins, an eaves band, and a pantile roof with shaped kneelers and stone coping. There are three storeys and four bays. The ground floor contains a shopfront, and on the upper floors are sash windows with keystones.	II
207 High Street; 54.34017°N 1.43479°W		Early to mid-18th century (probable)	A house, later a shop, it is rendered, and has a sill band, and a Welsh slate roof with shaped kneeler and stone coping on the right. There are three storeys and two bays. On the ground floor is a shopfront, and the upper floors contain casement windows.	II
215 High Street; 54.34062°N 1.43495°W		Early to mid-18th century	A house, later a shop, in red-brown brick, with dentilled eaves, a Welsh slate roof at the front and a Westmorland slate roof at the rear, with kneelers and stone coping. There are three storeys and three bays. The ground floor contains a shopfront, and on the upper floors are sash windows.	II
Register House; 54.33893°N 1.43289°W		1736	The building is in red brick with a dentilled cornice and a hipped stone slate roof. There are three storeys, fronts of three bays, and a rear two-storey wing. In the centre of the west front, the original doorway has been converted into a window, and it has a quoined surround and a large tripartite keystone. In the centre of the south front is an added porch, and the left return has a round-arched stair window. The other windows are sashes with flat arches and keystones. The rear wing contains a doorway with a quoined surround and a keystone.	II
79 High Street; 54.34124°N 1.43461°W		Mid-18th century	A house, later used for other purposes, in brick, with a concrete tile roof, shaped kneelers and stone coping. There are two storeys and three bays. In the left bay is a doorway in a quoined architrave, with a three-pane fanlight and a tripartite keystone. Above it is a square oriel window on brackets, with a coat of arms and a hipped Welsh slate roof. Elsewhere there are sash windows and one blocked window.	II
90 High Street; 54.34041°N 1.43422°W	—	Mid-18th century	A house, later a shop, in painted brown brick, with a pantile roof and a shaped kneeler and stone coping on the left. There are three storeys and three bays, and a rear wing. On the ground floor is a shop window with a doorway on the right, and a recessed passage doorway on the left. On the middle floor is a sash window with a keystone on the left, and a canted bay window on the right. The top floor contains three blocked window with keystones. In the rear wing are horizontally-sliding sash windows.	II
107 and 108 High Street; 54.33940°N 1.43381°W	—	Mid-18th century	A house, later two shops, in orange brick, with sill bands, dentilled eaves and a pantile roof. There are three storeys and three bays. On the ground floor is a central passage entry flanked by shopfronts, the right with a projecting canopy. The upper floors contain sash windows with flat arches, exposed sash boxes, terracotta voussoirs, and keystones.	II
109 High Street; 54.33932°N 1.43374°W	—	Mid-18th century	Two houses, later one store, it is rendered, and has a small dentilled cornice, and a roof partly in pantile and partly in Welsh slate, with stone coping. There are three storeys and four bays. On the ground floor is a passage doorway and shopfronts, the middle floor contains four segmental bow windows, and on the top floor are sash windows with keystones.	II
205 High Street; 54.34005°N 1.43473°W	—	Mid-18th century	A house, later a shop, in brown brick, with sill bands, and a Welsh slate roof. There are three storeys and three bays. The ground floor contains a shopfront, and on the upper floors are sash windows with keystones.	II
213 High Street; 54.34049°N 1.43488°W	—	Mid-18th century	A house, later a shop, in red-brown brick with dentilled eaves and a Welsh slate roof. There are three storeys and three bays. The ground floor contains a shopfront, on the middle floor are sash windows, and the top floor has casement windows.	II
Former Harewood Arms Inn; 54.33870°N 1.43414°W		Mid-18th century	The public house is in painted brick, with a dog-tooth eaves band, and a pantile roof with a shaped kneeler on the right and stone coping. There are three storeys and four bays. The left two bays on the ground floor contain canted bay windows, the right also containing an entrance, to its right is a segmental-arched carriage entrance, and in the right bay is a shopfront. Above the shopfront is a bay window, and the other windows on the upper two floors are sashes.	II
North Arch; 54.34265°N 1.43767°W		Mid-18th century	Two houses, later used for other purposes, in brick, with a stone slate roof, shaped kneelers and stone coping. There are three storeys and eight bays. In the fifth bay is a segmental carriage opening. The second and seventh bays each contains a round-arched doorway with a rusticated quoined surround, a fanlight, and extended voussoirs, and on the other bays are canted bay windows, each having pilasters with lotus capitals, a modillion cornice and a lead roof. The upper floors contain sash windows with flat arches.	II
The Golden Lion; 54.33913°N 1.43370°W		Mid-18th century	A coaching inn, later a hotel, it is roughcast, and has a cornice and a pantile roof. There are three storeys and a complex plan, with a main range of ten bays, and rear wings. On the front is a large porch with fluted Doric columns, a canopy with railings and a flat roof. The doorway has panelled pilasters, and an open pediment on beaded consoles. To the left are two large canted bay windows, and in the right bay is a carriage entrance. Elsewhere, there are sash windows.	II
Range to east of 102 High Street; 54.33962°N 1.43314°W	—	1751	A workshop in red brick, with dentilled eaves and a corrugated sheet roof. There are two storeys and eight bays. On the ground floor are a blocked cart opening with a keystone, three doorways with chamfered quoined surrounds and lintels with keystones, one dated, and horizontally-sliding sash windows. The upper floor contains sash windows, a loading door and a round-headed vent.	II
Durham House; 54.34084°N 1.43425°W		c. 1754	A house designed by John Carr, later two shops. The front is in sandstone, the sides and rear are in brown brick, and it has a sill band, a modillion cornice and a hipped Westmorland slate roof. There are three storeys and five bays. In the centre is a doorway with an architrave, stepped at the base, a swept outer architrave, a tripartite keystone, and a pediment on consoles. This is flanked by plate glass shop windows with cornices on plinths. The upper floors contain sash windows in architraves, those on the middle floor also with pulvinated friezes and cornices. On the left return is a round-arched stair window.	II*
Coach house to the east of 84 High Street; 54.34092°N 1.43400°W	—	c. 1754	The coach house, later a workshop, is in painted brick, with a floor band, an eaves band, and a pantile roof with coping forming a pediment. There are two storeys and three bays. The ground floor contains casement windows, and on the upper floor is a recessed Diocletian panel flanked by blind oculi. In the centre of the ridge is a wooden louvred vent.	II
2 and 3 East Road; 54.34104°N 1.43249°W	—	Mid to late 18th century	A coach house and yard entrance, later used for other purposes, in brick, with some stone dressings and partly rendered, and a hipped pantile roof. The middle bay has three storeys and contains a carriage arch with chamfered rusticated jambs, impost bands, and an archivolt with a tripartite keystone. Above this is a dentilled eaves course, and a turret with a moulded pediment containing a sash window and a Diocletian window above. This is flanked by two-storey two-bay wings containing doorways and sash windows.	II
59 High Street; 54.34270°N 1.43642°W	—	Mid to late 18th century	The house is rendered, and has a cornice, and a pantile roof with stone coping on the left. There are three storeys and three bays. In the right bay is a round-arched doorway with a Tuscan doorcase, and to the left are two canted bay windows. The upper floors contain sash windows.	II
85 and 86 High Street; 54.34071°N 1.43431°W	—	Mid to late 18th century	A house, later a shop, in red-brown brick, with a dentilled cornice, and a Welsh slate roof with a shaped kneeler and stone coping on the left. There are three storeys and an L-shaped plan, with a front range of three bays and a two-storey rear wing on the left. On the ground floor is a doorway flanked by shop windows, with a passage entry on the right. The upper floors contain sash windows with keystones, and in the rear wing is a canted bay window.	II
185 High Street; 54.33889°N 1.43418°W	—	Mid to late 18th century	A house, later a shop, it is rendered, and has an eaves band and a roughcast pantile roof. There are three storeys and one bay. The ground floor contains a shopfront, and on the upper floors are sash windows.	II
186 and 187 High Street; 54.33895°N 1.43420°W	—	Mid to late 18th century	One or two houses, later two shops, they are rendered, and have a pantile roof with shaped kneelers and stone coping. There are two storeys and four bays. On the ground floor are two shopfronts, the middle bay contains a large casement window to the left, and a canted bay window to the right, and on the top floor are sash windows. At the rear are two three-storey wings with tumbled gables, and a long single-storey stable range containing a stable door with a quoined sandstone surround, and a lintel with a keystone.	II
211 and 212 High Street; 54.34042°N 1.43488°W	—	Mid to late 18th century	A house, later a shop, in grey-brown brick, with dentilled eaves and a Welsh slate roof. There are three storeys and three bays. The ground floor has a shopfront and a doorway to the right, on the middle floor are sash windows with keystones, and the top floor contains casement windows with keystones.	II
Former police station 54.34192°N 1.43548°W		Mid to late 18th century	The building is in pink-brown brick, and has two storeys and an L-shaped plan. The main block on the front has seven bays, flanking recessed outer bays, and a rear wing on the right. The main block has sill bands, a moulded cornice and a hipped Westmorland slate roof. In the centre is a round-arched doorway with Roman Doric half-columns, a fanlight with Gothic glazing bars, a frieze with paterae, and an open pediment, and above it is a semicircular window. The outer three bays on each side are canted, with sash windows. The end bays each has a moulded cornice and a hipped Welsh slate roof, and contains a Tuscan doorcase and sash windows. The custody suite was closed in 2016, and the station entirely closed in 2017. It was redeveloped into a pub, opening in 2022.	II
Former The Black Bull; 54.33984°N 1.43391°W		Mid to late 18th century	A coaching inn, later a public house and a shop, it is in brown brick, the left two bays painted, with a floor band, a dentilled eaves band and a Welsh slate roof. There are three storeys and seven bays, and three rear wings. The left two bays contain a shopfront, and to its right is a segmental-arched carriage opening with a rusticated quoined surround. Further to the right is a doorway with a blind fanlight, a fluted frieze with paterae, and a pediment on moulded brackets, flanked by canted bay windows. The upper floor contains sash windows, those on the middle floor with wedge lintels.	II
60, 61 and 62 (part) High Street; 54.34263°N 1.43627°W	—	Late 18th century	A row of three houses, later used for other purposes, in brown-grey brick, the right house painted, with a Welsh slate roof and stone coping. There are three storeys, and each house has two bays and a lower gabled rear wing. Each of the left two houses has a canted bay window on the left, and to the right is a round-headed doorway with Tuscan pilasters, a fanlight, a frieze and a cornice. The right house contains part of a 20th-century shopfront. On the upper floors and at the rear are a mix of windows, with sashes, some horizontally-sliding, and casements.	II
77 High Street; 54.34270°N 1.43642°W	—	Late 18th century	A house, later an office, in pale brown brick, with paired gutter brackets, and a stone slate roof with shaped kneelers and stone coping. There are three storeys and three bays. In the centre is a round-headed doorway with fluted Tuscan pilasters, a fanlight with Gothic glazing, a frieze with paterae, and an open pediment. The windows on the front are sashes, and at the rear is a tall round-arched stair window.	II
93 and 94 High Street and Ankers Yard; 54.34019°N 1.43414°W	—	Late 18th century	A house, later used for other purposes, in brown brick with a dentilled cornice, and a Welsh slate roof with stone coping. There are three storeys and three bays. The ground floor contains a shopfront, and above are sash windows with flat arches.	II
173 High Street; 54.33825°N 1.43403°W		Late 18th century (probable)	A house, later a shop, in red-brown brick, with a cornice, and a pantile roof with shaped kneelers and stone coping. There are three storeys and three bays. On the ground floor is a shopfront, and the upper floors contain sash windows, those on the middle floor with keystones.	II
174 High Street; 54.33830°N 1.43399°W		Late 18th century (probable)	A house, later a shop, it is rendered, and has a cornice, and a Welsh slate roof with a shaped kneeler and stone coping on the right. There are three storeys and three bays, The ground floor contains a shopfront, and on the upper floors are sash windows with lintels and keystones.	II
200 and 201 High Street; 54.33992°N 1.43465°W	—	Late 18th century	Two houses, later part of a departmental store, now rendered, and with a dentilled cornice, and a pantile roof with shaped kneelers and stone coping. There are two storeys and four bays. On the ground floor is a store entrance flanked by shop windows, and the upper floors contain sash windows.	II
240 High Street; 54.34176°N 1.43625°W		1776	A grammar school on a corner site, that was extended in 1844 and later converted into offices. It is in brick with a dentilled cornice and a hipped pantile roof. There are two storeys and an L-shaped plan, with a front of three bays. On the front are sash windows, those on the ground floor with lintels and a segmental relieving arch, recessed under a painted arch with an impost band. On the right return is one bay with a similar window, and to the right is a lower house with two storeys and two bays, containing a doorway with a round-arched stair window above, and sash windows on the right bay.	II
The Quadrangle; 54.33870°N 1.43110°W		1788	Originally designed by John Carr, and extended around the 1820s, these are three remaining blocks from HM Prison Northallerton. They are arranged around a courtyard, and consist of the Governor's House, a wing for female prisoners from 1818, and a staff accommodation building. The buildings are in brick and mainly have roofs of Welsh slate.	II
North Bridge; 54.34582°N 1.43982°W		1792	The bridge, designed by John Carr, carries High Street over Brompton Beck. It is in sandstone, and consists of a single segmental arch with an archivolt flanked by pilaster buttresses. There is a band below the parapets, which have triangular coping, and end in circular bollards.	II
Old Theatre; 54.33871°N 1.43536°W	—	c. 1800	The theatre, later used for other purposes, is in orange-brown-red brick, with dentilled eaves, and a pantile roof with shaped kneelers and stone coping. There are two storeys and four bays. It contains an inserted doorway and windows.	II
87 High Street; 54.34068°N 1.43431°W	—	Late 18th to early 19th century	A house, later a shop, in brown brick with a tile roof. There are three storeys, two bays and a rear wing. The ground floor has a doorway flanked by shop windows, and to the right is a passage entry. The upper floors contain sash windows, and above the entry is a wrought iron bracket for a sign.	II
92 High Street; 54.34027°N 1.43414°W	—	Late 18th to early 19th century	A house, later a shop, it is roughcast, and has a pantile roof with a kneeler and stone coping on the left. There are three storeys and four bays. The ground floor contains late 19th century plate glass shop windows with a colonnette frame, a metal grill as a frieze, traditional lettering on the fascia, and a shop blind on fluted pilasters. On the upper floors are sash windows.	II
199 High Street; 54.33972°N 1.43456°W	—	Late 18th to early 19th century	A house, later part of a departmental store, it is rendered, and has a decorative cornice and a Welsh slate roof. There are three storeys and three bays. On the ground floor is a shopfront, and the upper floors contain sash windows with flat arches and raised keystones.	II
The Mount; 54.34619°N 1.44445°W		Late 18th to early 19th century	A large house, later used for other purposes, in brown brick, with sill bands, a moulded gutter, and a hipped roof, mainly in Welsh slate with some Westmorland slate. The main block has three storeys and five bays, and contains a central doorway with a fanlight in an architrave, a frieze and a cornice. The windows on the ground floor are casements, and on the upper floors they are sashes. Flanking the main bay are two-storey two-bay wings with sash windows, and outside these are single bays with lean-to roofs.	II
Zion United Reformed Church; 54.33858°N 1.43474°W		1819	The church is in brown brick on a plinth, with a cornice and a blocking course, and a hipped tile roof. There are two storeys and three bays. In the centre is a flat-roofed projecting porch containing a round-arched doorway with an impost band and a cornice. Flanking the doorway, and recessed on the upper floor, are round-arched sash windows with impost bands.	II
234 and 235 High Street; 54.34150°N 1.43590°W	—	Early 19th century	Two houses, later a shop and an office, in brown brick, with a floor band, and a Welsh slate roof with square kneelers and stone coping. On the centre of the ground floor are two segmental bow windows containing sashes with fluted pilasters, a sill band and a flat lead roof. Outside these are round-headed doorways, each with a fanlight containing Gothic glazing. The upper floor contains sash windows with flat arches.	II
Newton House; 54.33844°N 1.43402°W	—	Early 19th century (probable)	A house, later a shop, it is rendered, and has a parapet with three sections of balustrading separated by plain panels, and a pantile roof with stone coping on the right. There are two storeys and three bays. The left bay contains a doorway with a rusticated chamfered quoined surround and a large keystone. To the right is a shopfront, and on the upper floor are sash windows with wedge lintels.	II
139 High Street; 54.33730°N 1.43349°W	—	Early to mid-19th century	The house is in brown brick on a stone plinth, with a floor band, a moulded gutter, and a Welsh slate roof with stone coping. There are three storeys and two bays. In the middle of the ground floor is a canted bay window, and to its right is a doorway with three-quarters Doric columns, a fanlight, a cornice and a blocking course. The middle floor contains a canted oriel window with a modillion cornice, to the right is a sash window, and on the top floor are small square casement windows.	II
230 High Street; 54.34134°N 1.43562°W	—	Early to mid-19th century	A house, later a shop, in painted brick, with a Welsh slate roof, shaped kneelers and stone coping. There are two storeys and two bays. On the ground floor is a doorway on the left with Tuscan pilasters and a cornice, and to the right is a canted bay window. The upper floor contains sash windows.	II
Standard House; 54.34322°N 1.43710°W	—	Early to mid-19th century	The house, later used for other purposes, is in red-brown brick with a floor band and a hipped Westmorland slate roof. There are two storeys and an L-shaped plan, with a front range of three bays and a rear wing on the left. In the centre is a doorway with Doric half-columns, a round-headed fanlight, a frieze and a cornice, flanked by square bay windows with hipped roofs. The upper floor contains sash windows with flat arches.	II
5–7 Friarage Terrace; 54.34232°N 1.43367°W		1844	A school, later converted into three houses, in dark red-brown brick with a dentilled cornice and a hipped pantile roof. There are two storeys and seven bays. On the front are three doorways with canopies. On the right bay is a canted bay window, and the other windows are sashes.	II
Female Cell Block, HM Prison Northallerton; 54.33878°N 1.43063°W		1852	The former prison block, originally designed for women, is in brown-red brick, with sandstone dressings and a Welsh slate roof. There are three storeys and five bays, and it contains nearly square cell windows.	II
Zion Sunday School; 54.33853°N 1.43527°W		1852	The building is in brown brick with an eaves band and a Welsh slate roof. There is one storey and three bays. On the north front are three round-arched panels, the outer ones containing round-headed sash windows, and the middle panel with a sandstone plaque containing an inscription and the date.	II
Town Hall; 54.34041°N 1.43448°W		1873	The town hall, incorporating shops, is in brick, with dressings in brick and stone, a moulded and bracketed eaves cornice, a hipped slate roof, and two storeys. On the south front is a single-storey porch approached by steps, with a rusticated quoined surround. On the ground floor are segmental-arched shop windows, and the upper floor contains flat-arched sash windows.	II
