= Porch House, Northallerton =

Building in Northallerton, North Yorkshire, England

Coordinates: 54°20′32″N 1°26′09″W

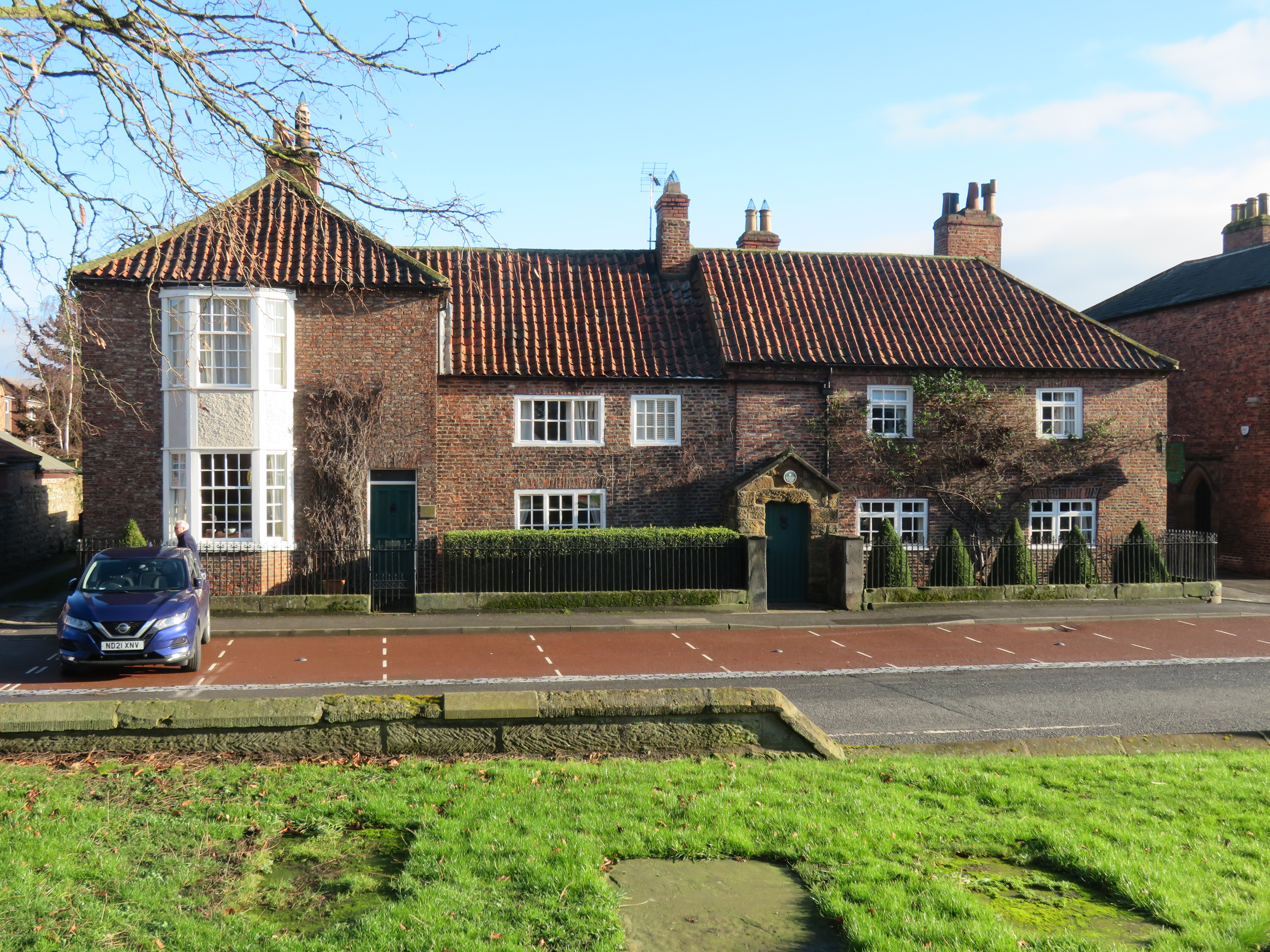
The building, in 2024

Porch House is a historic building in Northallerton, a town in North Yorkshire, in England.

The building was constructed in 1584 for Richard Metcalfe, with an open hall. A wing was added to the rear right in the mid 17th century, then in 1684 a large two-storey porch was added, giving the house its name. In the late 17th century, a floor was inserted in the hall, then in 1781 the building was extensively altered, the work including the addition of a range to the left, and the replacement of the thatched roofs with pantiles. In 1844, the building was further altered, and the porch was demolished and replaced with a single-storey structure. Perhaps at this time, the house was divided into three properties. Railings were installed in front of the house, to protect it during the town's cattle market.

Local tradition claims that Charles I of England stayed in the house in 1640 and then was imprisoned there in 1647 before being handed over to Oliver Cromwell. A local legend claims that a secret tunnel connects the house with All Saints' Church, Northallerton, but no tunnel has been discovered.

The Metcalfe family later became the Marwood family, and owned the house until 1988. It was marketed for sale in 2009, for £500,000. It has since operated as a guest house. It has been grade II listed since 1969.

The house has a timber framed core, it is enclosed in brick, and has a pantile roof. It has two storeys, a range of four bays, and a projecting cross-wing on the left with a hipped roof. In the centre of the main range is a single-storey sandstone porch containing a doorway with an ogee-shaped lintel, and a coped gable with a finial. The windows are a mix of horizontally-sliding sashes and casements. The cross-wing contains a two-storey canted bay window and a doorway to the right. In front of the house are wrought iron railings on a low wall.

== See also ==
- Listed buildings in Northallerton
