= Listed buildings in Romanby =

Romanby is a civil parish in the county of North Yorkshire, England. It contains ten listed buildings that are recorded in the National Heritage List for England. Of these, one is listed at Grade II*, the middle of the three grades, and the others are at Grade II, the lowest grade. The parish contains the village of Romanby and the surrounding area. It is to the northwest of, and contiguous with, the market town of Northallerton. The listed buildings consist of houses and farmhouses, three bridges, a church, a hotel, a block of administrative offices, and a war memorial clock tower.

== Key ==
Grade	Criteria
II*	Particularly important buildings of more than special interest
II	Buildings of national importance and special interest

== Buildings ==
Name and location	Photograph	Date	Notes	Grade
Howden Bridge; 54.32277°N 1.46184°W		15th century	The bridge carries a road over the River Wiske, and is in stone. The earlier two arches are pointed and chamfered, and have a triangular cutwater rising to a pedestrian refuge. To the east is a 19th-century segmental arch with voussoirs, pilasters, a band and a parapet.	II
Packhorse Bridge; 54.33605°N 1.45090°W		16th century	The bridge, which carries a footpath over Willow Beck, was repaired in 1621. It is in stone, and consists of a single slightly-recessed segmental arch with a parapet of large blocks of stone.	II
Spital House; 54.32803°N 1.42526°W	—	16th century	A farmhouse that was largely rebuilt in the 18th century as a house and a cottage, in red brick and stone. Both parts have pantile roofs with brick coping, and two storeys. The house has two bays, a central gabled porch, and one casement window, the other windows being sashes. The cottage is recessed on the left and has one bay, a doorway with a segmental arch, and a sash window on each floor, that on the upper floor horizontally sliding.	II
Yafforth Bridge; 54.34449°N 1.46897°W		c. 1682	The bridge carries the B6271 road over the River Wiske. It is in sandstone, and consists of two segmental arches flanking an abutment, one over the main stream, and the other over a flood channel. On the downstream side, the main arch has a chamfered hood mould above voussoirs, and the smaller arch is supported on a chamfered rib. The upstream side dates from the 18th century, both arches have archivolts, and each is flanked by pilaster buttresses. Both sides have a band and a long parapet ending in circular bollards.	II
52 The Green; 54.33534°N 1.44962°W	—	Early 18th century	The house is in rendered brick, and has a tile roof with coped gables and shaped kneelers. There are two storeys, three bays, flanking single-storey bays, and a later rear wing. The central doorway has a ribbed surround, a fanlight, paterae, a frieze and a cornice. The windows are sashes with stuccoed flat arches and at the rear is a round-arched stair window.	II
High Thornborough Farmhouse; 54.335347°N 1.449593°W	—	Mid-18th century	The farmhouse is in rendered red brick, with an eaves band, and a pantile roof with shaped kneelers and stone coping. There are two storeys and three bays, and flanking single-storey bays. On the front is a porch, the ground floor windows are casements, and on the upper floor are horizontally sliding sashes. Inside, there is an inglenook fireplace.	II
St James' Church; 54.33315°N 1.44741°W		1880–82	The church, designed by C. Hodgson Fowler, is in stone with tile roofs. It consists of a nave and a chancel in one unit, with a lean-to vestry. At the junction of the nave and the chancel is a bellcote with a slate-hung base and an octagonal spire. On the north side is a projecting gabled porch containing an arched doorway with a chamfered and moulded surround.	II
Station Hotel; 54.33367°N 1.44025°W		1902	The hotel is in red brick on a moulded plinth, with tile hanging and terracotta dressings, and tile roofs. There are two storeys and attics, a front of five bays and a former coach house to the right. The doorway has a moulded terracotta surround, fluted pilasters and an open semicircular pediment. To the left is an oriel window on the upper floor, to the right is a two-storey canted bay window, and further to the right is a segmental carriage arch with moulded and rusticated voussoirs and a keystone. On the front are two gables with applied timber framing and a similar smaller gable over the coach house. The windows are casements, and in the attic is a pedimented dormer.	II
County Hall; 54.33299°N 1.43883°W		1904–14	The administrate offices were designed by Walter Brierley. They are in red brick and stone, with stone dressings and a Westmorland slate roof. The building is mainly in two storeys, and has a square courtyard plan, with a main front of 15 bays, and returns of 23 bays. In the centre of the courtyard is a square building containing the council chamber. The middle three bays of the main range project to form an entrance, with full-height engaged Corinthian columns and pilasters, and a round-arched doorway with an impost band, and a keystone over which is a balcony. Above this is a tall window, a modillion cornice and an open pediment.	II*
War Memorial Clock Tower; 54.33267°N 1.44715°W		1927	The war memorial is in the form of a four stage clock tower, on a plinth, on three steps, and is in brick faced in stone. The tall second stage has a moulded cornice and narrow loop windows. Towards the top are roundels, two containing clock faces. Above are semicircular openings on each side, and at the top is a sarcophagus with a depressed pyramidal top. On the plinth are stone tablets with inscriptions and the names of those lost in the two World Wars.	II
