= The Fleece Inn, Northallerton =

Pub in Northallerton, North Yorkshire, England

Coordinates: 54°20′26″N 1°26′03″W

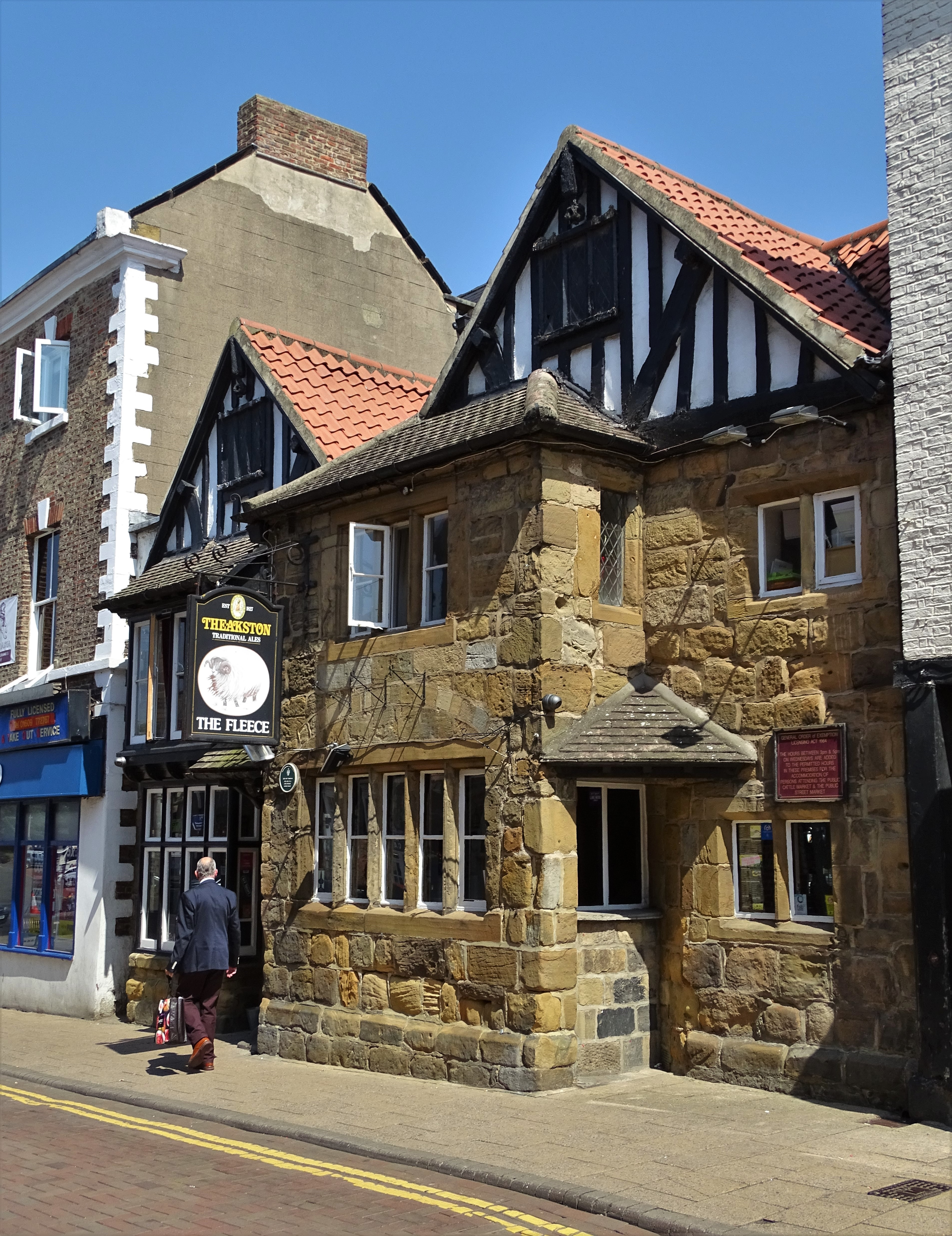
The building, in 2019

The Fleece Inn is a historic pub in Northallerton, a town in North Yorkshire, in England.

An Augustinian friary was constructed in Northallerton in about 1340 and was dissolved around 1530. The Fleece Inn occupies part of its site, and was probably built as a house the 15th century. It has been altered over the centuries, eventually becoming a pub. Nikolaus Pevsner described it as "over-restored". The building was grade II listed in 1969. In the early 2020s it was converted into an Italian restaurant, but soon became a pub again. A plaque on the front of the building claims that it may have been where Charles Dickens wrote Nicholas Nickleby.

The pub is built of sandstone, with timber framing on the gables, and a pantile roof. There are two storeys and attics, a gabled wing on the left, a projecting gabled cross-wing to the right, and a left rear wing. On the left is a two-storey square bay window with casement windows and a tile roof. In the centre is a porch, and to the right is a two-storey square bay window containing mullioned windows, and with a tiled hipped roof. The gables also contain mullioned windows. Inside, there are stone floors with massive slabs, low oak-beamed ceilings, and a built-in salt box in the right-hand ground floor room.

== See also ==
- Listed buildings in Northallerton
