= Durham House, Northallerton =

House in Northallerton, North Yorkshire, England

Coordinates: 54°20′27″N 1°26′03″W

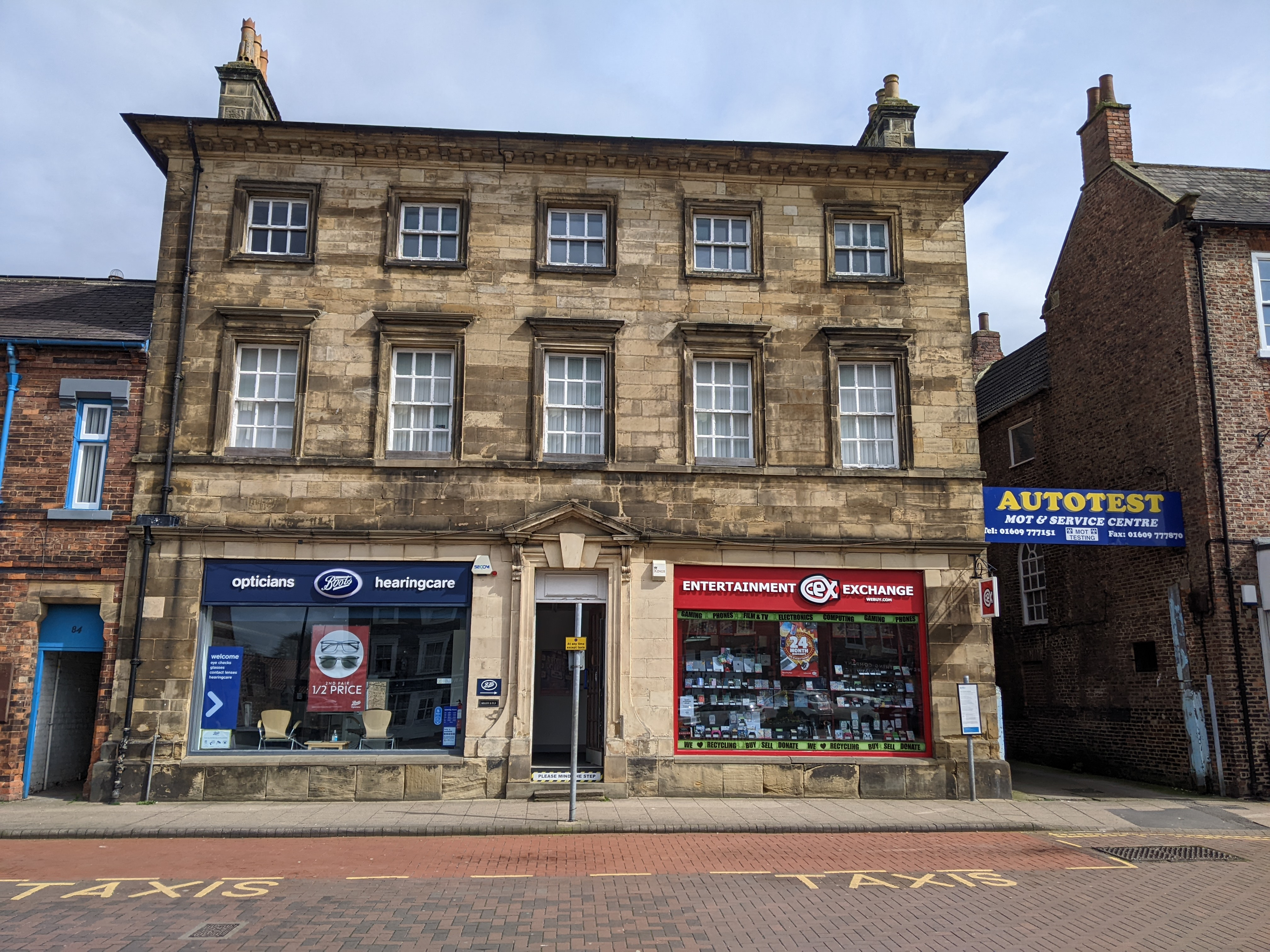
The building, in 2024

Durham House is a historic building in Northallerton, a town in North Yorkshire, in England.

The building was constructed in 1754 for D. Mitford, to a design by John Carr. In 1860, it was converted into a girls' boarding school. This closed in 1871, and the building was converted into a masonic hall. The former coach house was used by a coachbuilder from 1876, then later as a garage repairing vehicles and selling petrol. By 2011, the house was used for retail. That year, it suffered a serious fire but was later restored. The building has been grade II* listed since 1952.

The front of the building is in sandstone, the sides and rear are in brown brick, and it has a sill band, a modillion cornice and a hipped Westmorland slate roof. It has three storeys and five bays. In the centre is a doorway with an architrave, stepped at the base, a swept outer architrave, a tripartite keystone, and a pediment on consoles. This is flanked by plate glass shop windows with cornices on plinths. The upper floors contain sash windows in architraves, those on the middle floor also with pulvinated friezes and cornices. On the left return is a round-arched stair window.

The former coach house is built of painted brick, with a floor band, an eaves band, and a pantile roof with coping forming a pediment. There are two storeys and three bays. The ground floor contains casement windows, and on the upper floor is a recessed Diocletian panel flanked by blind oculi. In the centre of the ridge is a wooden louvred vent. It is also by Carr and is grade II listed.

== See also ==
- Grade II* listed buildings in North Yorkshire (district)
- Listed buildings in Northallerton
