= Zion United Reformed Church =

Zion United Reformed Church is the name of:

- Zion United Reformed Church, Cottingham in the East Riding of Yorkshire, in England
- Zion United Reformed Church, Northallerton in North Yorkshire, in England
