= The Golden Lion Hotel, Northallerton =

Hotel in Northallerton, North Yorkshire, England

Coordinates: 54.3391°N 1.4337°W

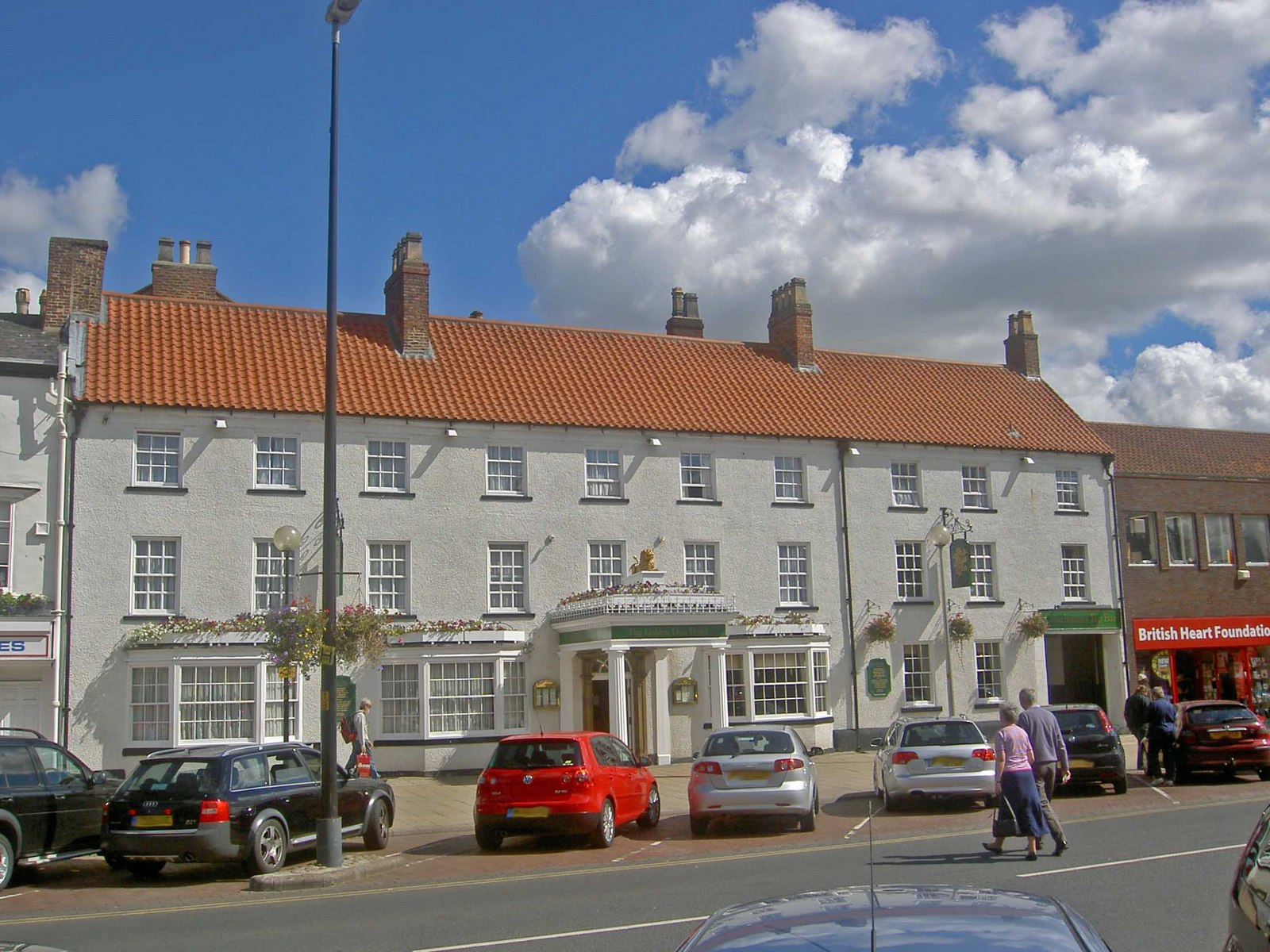
The hotel, in 2010

The Golden Lion Hotel is a historic building in Northallerton, a town in North Yorkshire, in England.

The original Golden Lion was a small coaching inn built in the 18th century, the third to be established in the town after the Black Bull and the King's Head. In 1745, John Wesley preached at the inn. Around this time, it was replaced by a much larger inn of the same inn, which dominated the town's postal service and stabled about 30 horses. It later became a hotel, with guests including the future Nicholas I of Russia, Prince Arthur, Duke of Connaught and Strathearn and Andrew Carnegie. In the 1920s, it was taken over by the Trust House group, which owned it until 1998. It appears in the 1945 film The Way to the Stars. The building was grade II listed in 1952.

The hotel has roughcast rendering, a cornice and a pantile roof. It has three storeys and a complex plan, with a main range of ten bays, and rear wings. On the front is a large porch with fluted Doric columns, a canopy with railings and a flat roof. The doorway has panelled pilasters, and an open pediment on beaded consoles. To the left are two large canted bay windows, and in the right bay is a carriage entrance. Elsewhere, there are sash windows.

== See also ==
- Listed buildings in Northallerton
