= Katch =

Pub in Northallerton, North Yorkshire, England

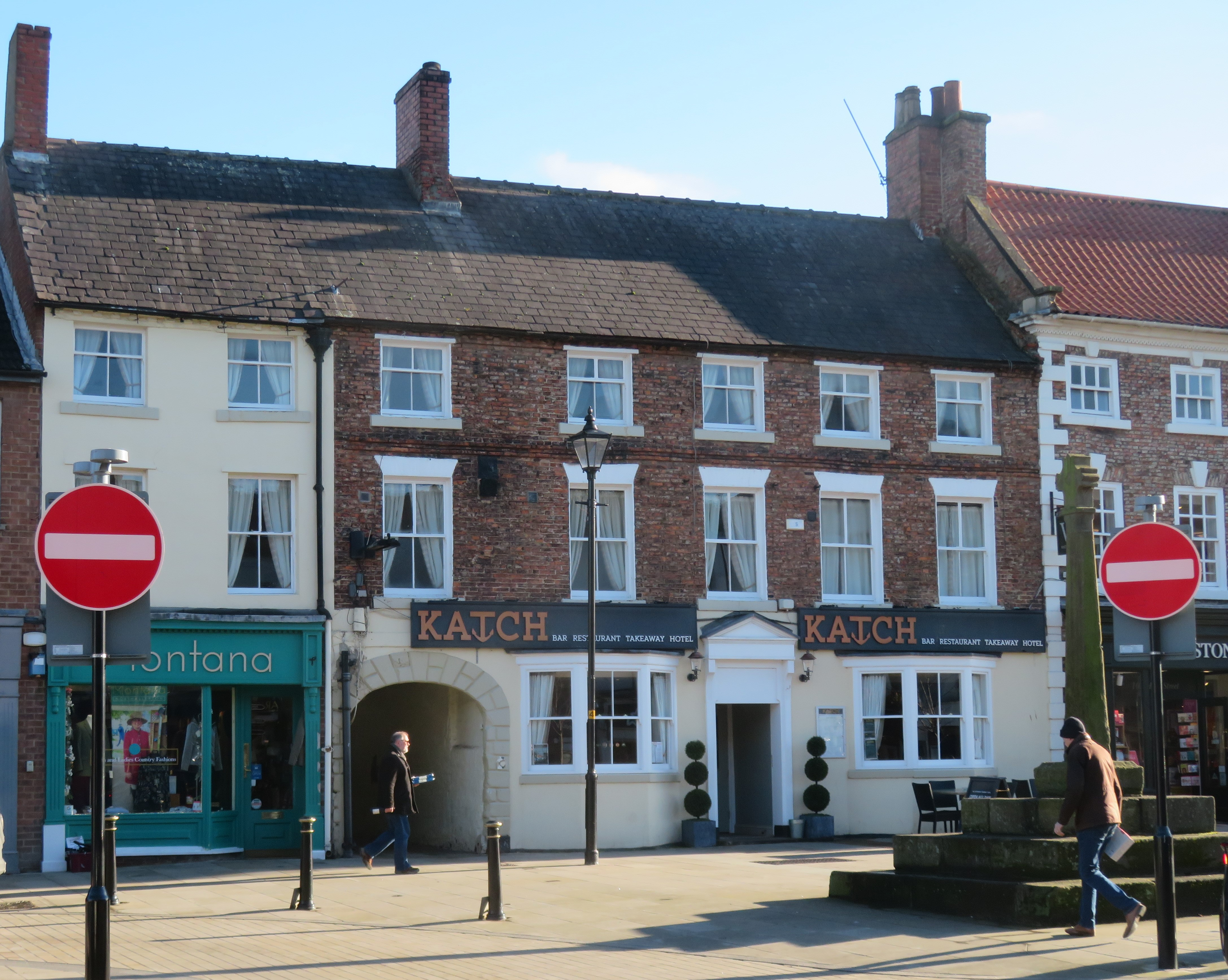
The pub, in 2024

Katch is a historic pub in Northallerton, a town in North Yorkshire, in England.

The pub was built as the Black Bull, a coaching inn, in the mid-18th century. It was one of the town's first two coaching inns, with the King's Head, and the first to serve as a destination for mail coaches. It was also a stopping point on the Leeds to Newcastle stagecoach route, and in 1785 received the first direct London to Edinburgh coach. By the late 19th century, the building had been divided to provide a smaller pub and a drapers' shop. In 2019, the pub was renamed "Katch", and his since been a combined pub, fish restaurant and hotel, while the other part of the building remains a shop. The building was grade II listed in 1969.

The building is constructed of brown brick, the left two bays painted, with a floor band, a dentilled eaves band and a Welsh slate roof. It has three storeys and seven bays, and three rear wings. The left two bays contain a shopfront, and to its right is a segmental-arched carriage opening with a rusticated quoined surround. Further to the right is a doorway with a blind fanlight, a fluted frieze with paterae, and a pediment on moulded brackets, flanked by canted bay windows. The upper floor contains sash windows, those on the middle floor with wedge lintels.

== See also ==
- Listed buildings in Northallerton
