= Black cow =

Black cow or Black Cow can refer to:

- A root beer float
- Black Cow Vodka, a brand of vodka made from whey, a byproduct of cheesemaking
- "Black Cow", a song on Steely Dan's 1977 album Aja

== See also ==
- Black Bull (disambiguation)
