= Zion United Reformed Church, Northallerton =

Church in Northallerton, North Yorkshire, England

Coordinates: 54°20′19″N 1°26′05″W

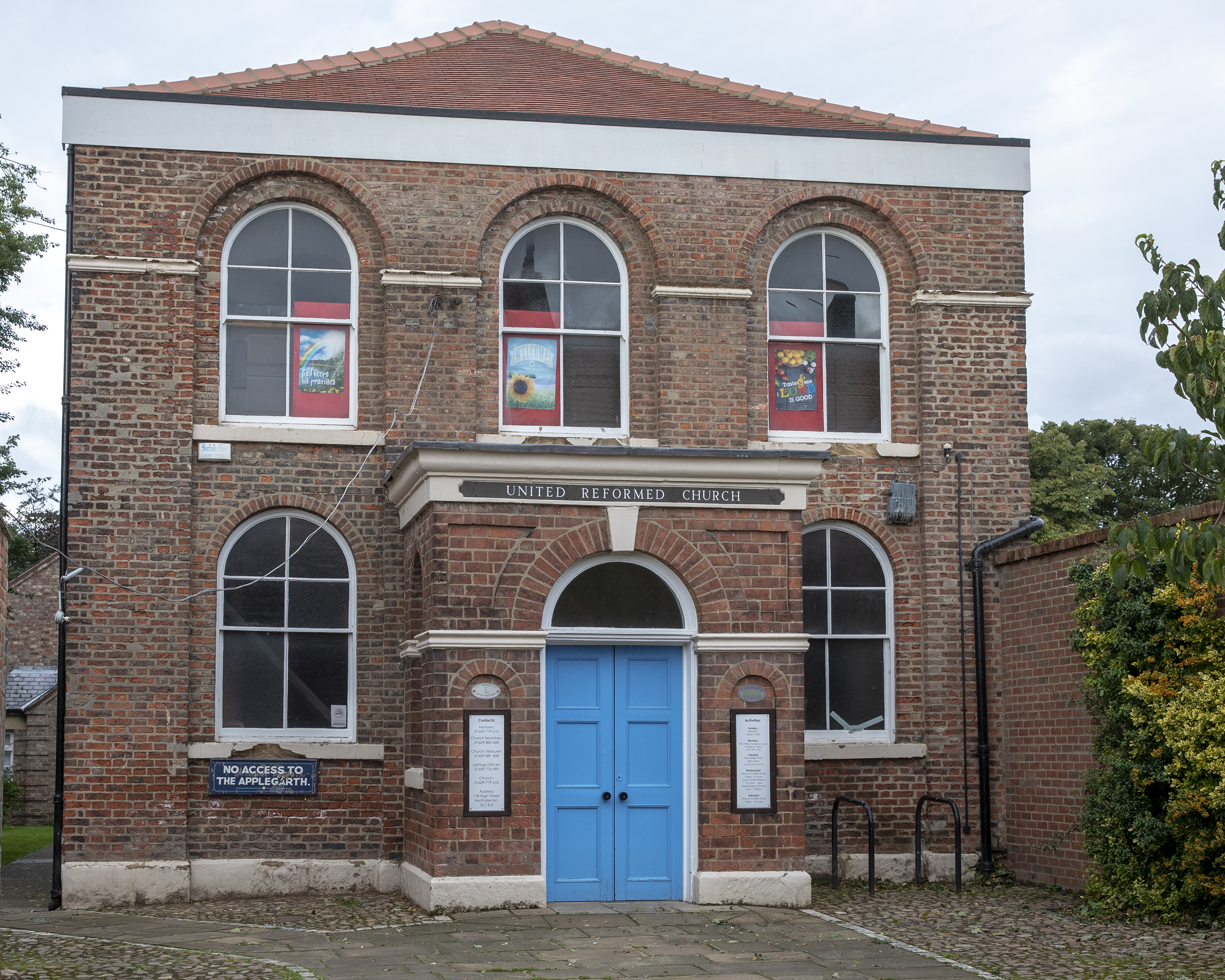
The church, in 2018

The Zion United Reformed Church is a historic church in Northallerton, a town in North Yorkshire, in England.

In the early 19th century, Congregationalists preached in Northallerton as part of a North Yorkshire circuit, and then from a base in Thirsk. A Mr Trousdale, a deacon from Whitby, moved to Northallerton and succeeded in building a congregation and raising funds for a church. This was opened on 1 January 1819. In 1852, the church constructed a Sunday school to the rear. In the early or mid 20th century, a vestry range was added to the church. In 1872, the Congregational Union of England and Wales became part of the new United Reformed Church. The church and school were separately grade II listed in 1988. In 2023, the church submitted plans for renovations including a new side entrance, but Historic England argued that the work would harm the building's heritage value.

The church is built of brown brick on a plinth, with a cornice and a blocking course, and a hipped tile roof. There are two storeys and three bays. In the centre is a flat-roofed projecting porch containing a round-arched doorway with an impost band and a cornice. Flanking the doorway, and recessed on the upper floor, are round-arched sash windows with impost bands.

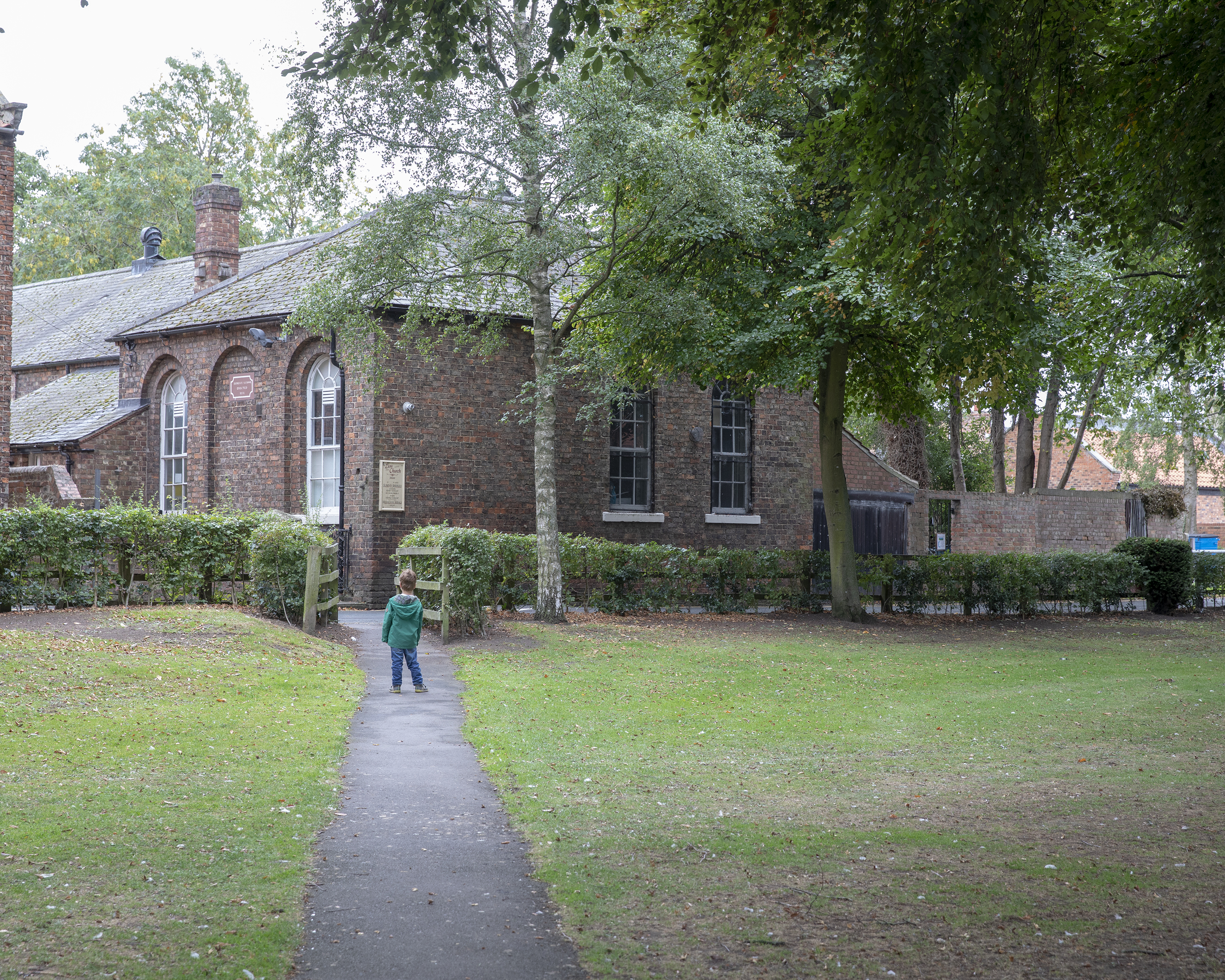
The Sunday School, in 2018

The former Sunday School, now a church hall, is built of brown brick with an eaves band and a Welsh slate roof. It has one storey and three bays. On the north front are three round-arched panels, the outer ones containing round-headed sash windows, and the middle panel with a sandstone plaque containing an inscription and the date.

== See also ==
- Listed buildings in Northallerton
