= All Saints' Church, Northallerton =

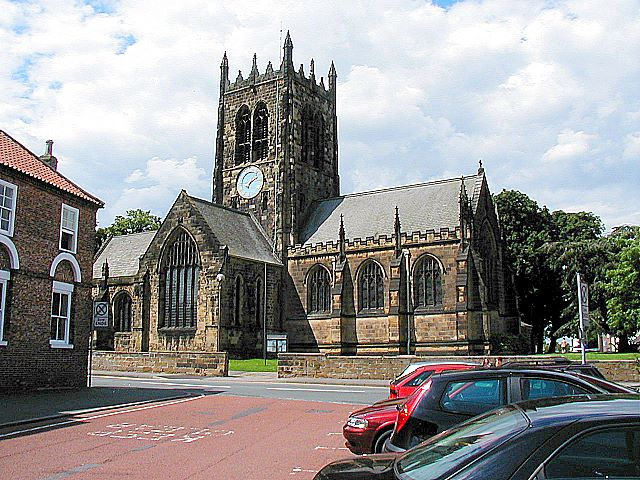
- All Saints' Church, Northallerton
- All Saints' Church, Northallerton
- 54°20′30.69″N 1°26′12.65″W
- OS grid reference: SE 36725 94200
- Location: Northallerton
- Country: England
- Denomination: Church of England
- Churchmanship: Central
- Website: Benefice website

History
- Dedication: All Saints

Architecture
- Heritage designation: Grade I listed

Administration
- Province: York
- Diocese: York
- Archdeaconry: Cleveland
- Deanery: Mowbray
- Parish: Northallerton

Clergy
- Vicar: The Revd David Johnson

All Saints’ Church, Northallerton is a Grade I listed parish church in the Church of England in Northallerton, North Yorkshire.

== History ==
The first church was set up by St Paulinus of York on the site of the present All Saints' Parish Church sometime in the early 7th century. It was made from wood and nothing survives of it. In 855 a stone church was built on the same site, fragments of stone have been found during restoration work which provide strong evidence of this Saxon church.

The Saxon church was likely destroyed by the Scots during the First War of Scottish Independence in 1318, and the current church building was commissioned by Bishop Thomas Hatfield of Durham and dates from the twelfth century with parts from the 13th, 14th and 15th centuries. The chancel was pulled down in 1779 and rebuilt. This was pulled down in November 1882 and a new one erected in 1885 to the designs of Charles Hodgson Fowler. The exterior walls were repaired, and the transept walls which had leaned outwards were returned to the vertical. The tracery in the windows was restored and a new window inserted in the west end of the nave. The south aisle walls were reconstructed and the lancet windows in the transept which were filled with stone, were opened out. The cost of the restoration works was around £6,000 (equivalent to £670,000 in 2025). The new chancel was reopened on 26 May 1885 by the Archbishop of York.

== Parish status ==
The church is in a joint parish with

- St Lawrence's Church, Kirby Sigston
- St James’ Church, Romanby

== Organ ==
A pipe organ was built in 1818 by James Chapman Bishop. It has been subsequently restored and enlarged. A specification of the organ can be found on the National Pipe Organ Register.

== Bells ==
The bells were recast in 1962 by John Taylor & co of Loughborough, and augmented to a peal of ten in 1991. The bells weigh just under a ton and rung in the art form of change ringing. The tower has a band which rings for Sunday Service, funerals, weddings etc. The bells ring out every Sunday morning from 9:45–10:45.

== See also ==
- Grade I listed buildings in North Yorkshire (district)
- Listed buildings in Northallerton

== Gallery ==
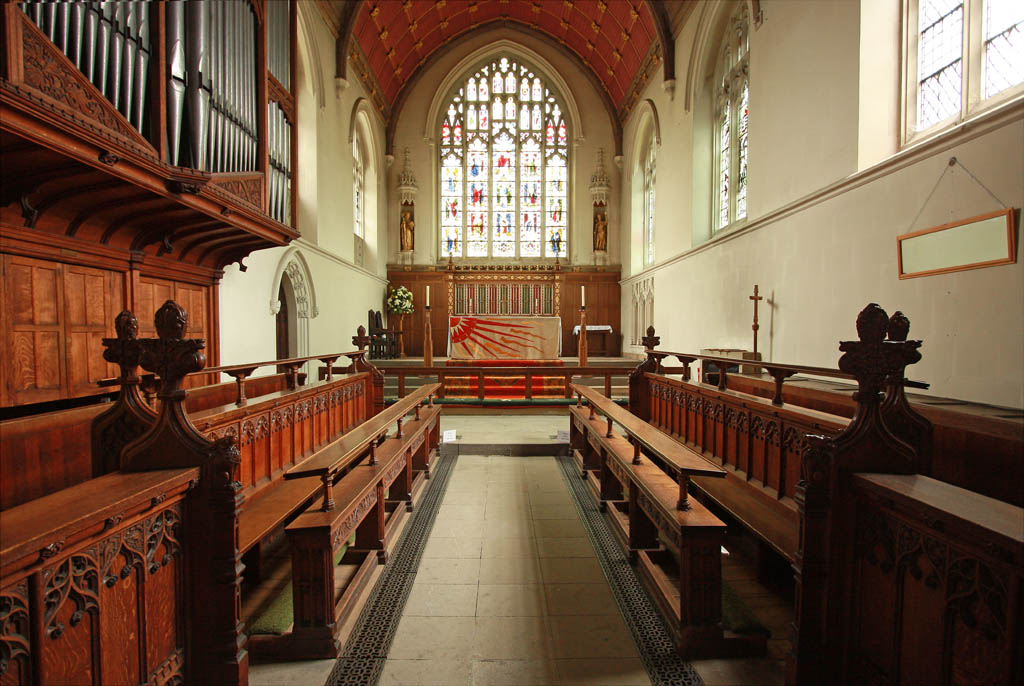
Chancel

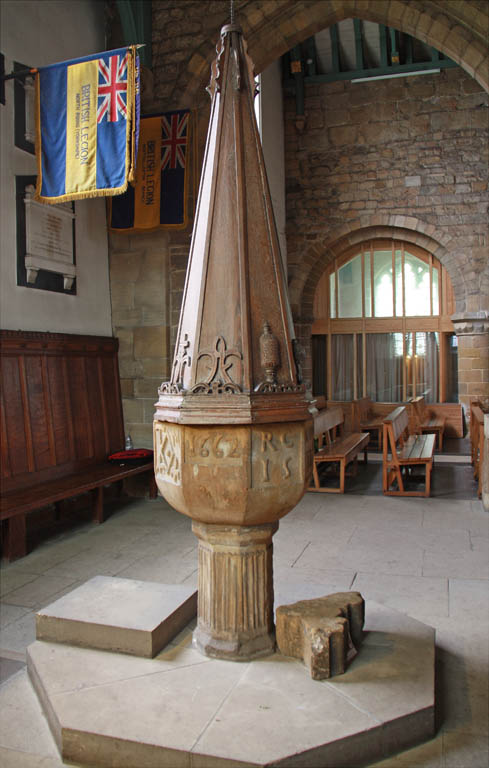
Font

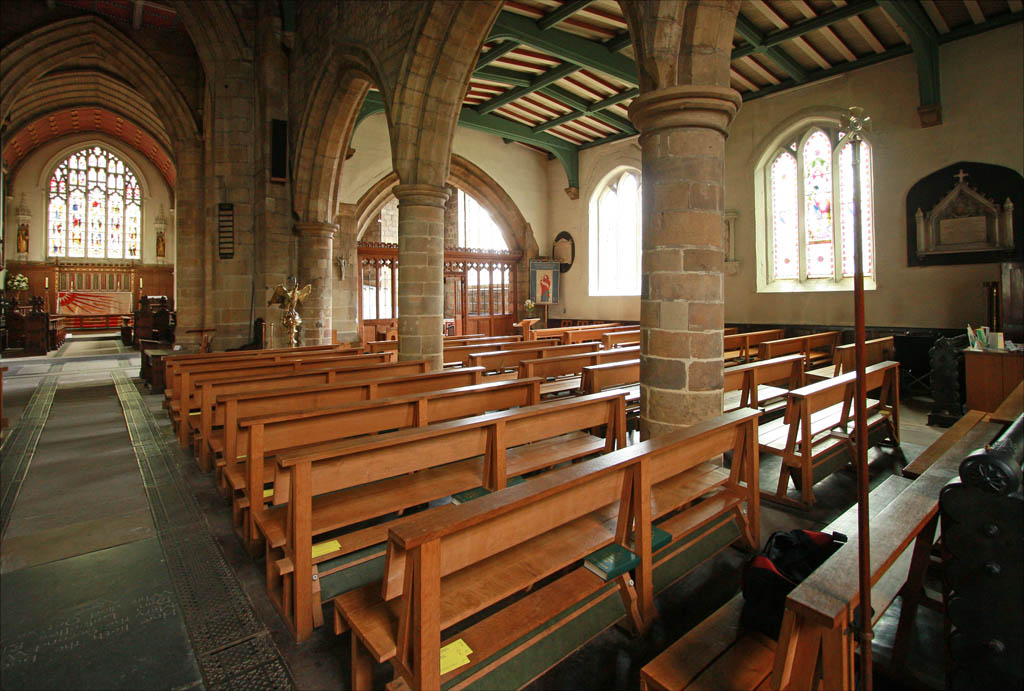
Nave

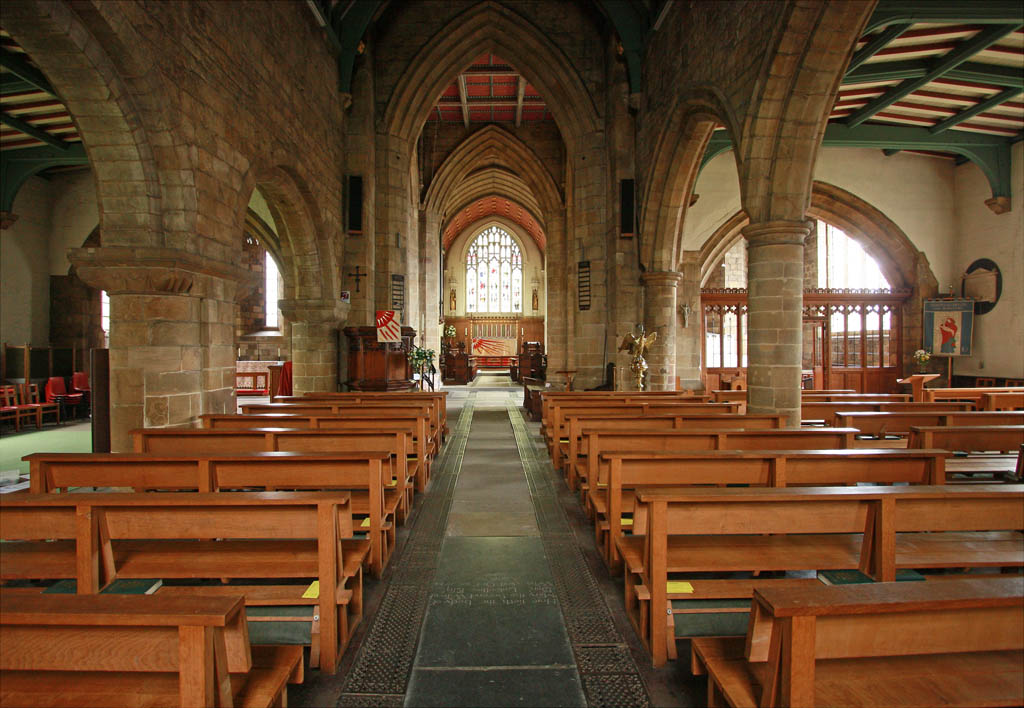
Nave
