= Romanby =

Village and civil parish in North Yorkshire, England

Coordinates: 54°19′54″N 1°26′46″W

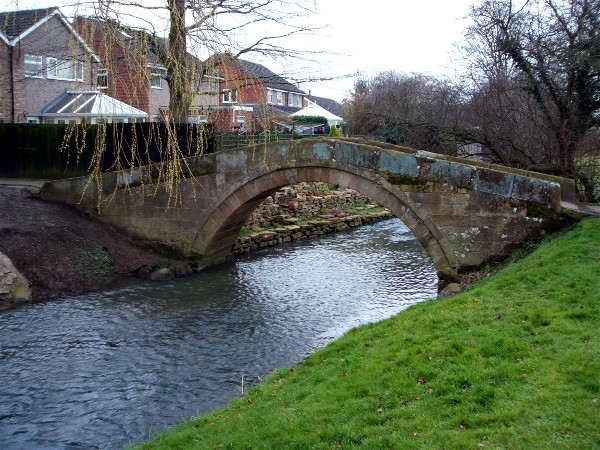
- Packhorse bridge across Willow Beck

- Location within North Yorkshire
- Population: 6,177 (2011 census)
- OS grid reference: SE361927
- Unitary authority: North Yorkshire
- Ceremonial county: North Yorkshire
- Region: Yorkshire and the Humber
- Country: England
- Sovereign state: United Kingdom
- Post town: Northallerton
- Postcode district: DL7
- Dialling code: 01609
- Police: North Yorkshire
- Fire: North Yorkshire
- Ambulance: Yorkshire
- UK Parliament: Richmond and Northallerton

Romanby is a village and civil parish in North Yorkshire, England. Romanby is situated south-west of and contiguous with Northallerton, and at the 2001 UK census had a population of 6,051, increasing to 6,177 at the 2011 Census.

== History ==
The name Romanby suggests that the village dates from Roman times, but derives from the Viking name Hromund. The village was mentioned in the Domesday Book as belonging to King William.

Romanby chapel, which dated from the 13th century, was demolished in 1523 on the orders of the Bishop of Durham, Thomas Wolsey. Its destruction was ordered because the vicar of Northallerton at the time, had questioned the bishop's authority. St James' Church, Romanby was built in 1882. It is a grade II listed structure. Romanby Methodist Church dates from 1962.

== Geography ==
Before the railway was built, Romanby was separated from Northallerton by a 0.5-mile (0.8 km) strip of pasture land, but since the railway opened, the spread of each settlement means that the two are contiguous. The Wensleydale Railway passes over a bridge on the outskirts of Romanby village on its way to Redmire from Northallerton West railway station.

A grade II listed packhorse bridge straddles the Willow Beck. Water from the beck powered a water-mill in the village, which was last listed in 1663. The beck flows southwards and enters the River Wiske before the A684 road. The River Wiske formed the western boundary of the old Allertonshire Wapentake. In March 2025, more than 3,700 trees were planted on a 9.5 acres (3.8 ha) site between the village and the Willow Beck. The community woodland, known as Thompson's Wood after the landowners, is part of the White Rose Forest initiative.

== Governance ==
North Yorkshire Council has its headquarters at County Hall in Romanby, which is built on the site of a former racecourse. County Hall was designed by the York architect Walter Brierley for North Riding County Council. The main building constructed in 1904–14 is of two storeys in red brick with ashlar details on a square courtyard plan, it has a 15-bay frontage and 23-bay returns. It is a grade II* listed building.

Romanby electoral ward does not cover all the parish and had a total population at the 2011 Census of 3,946.

From 1974 to 2023 Romanby was part of the Hambleton District, it is now administered by the unitary North Yorkshire Council.

== Amenities ==
The village has several shops, a post office, a dentist, a hairdressers and a public house, the Golden Lion.

Romanby is served by Romanby Primary School. The local secondary school and sixth form is Northallerton School.

Romanby Golf Course on the village outskirts has an 18-hole course, floodlit driving range and a clubhouse. Northallerton Town Football Club is located in Romanby.

== See also ==
- Listed buildings in Romanby
