= Freddie Gilroy and the Belsen Stragglers =

Statue in Scarborough, England

Coordinates: 54.2899°N 0.4024°W

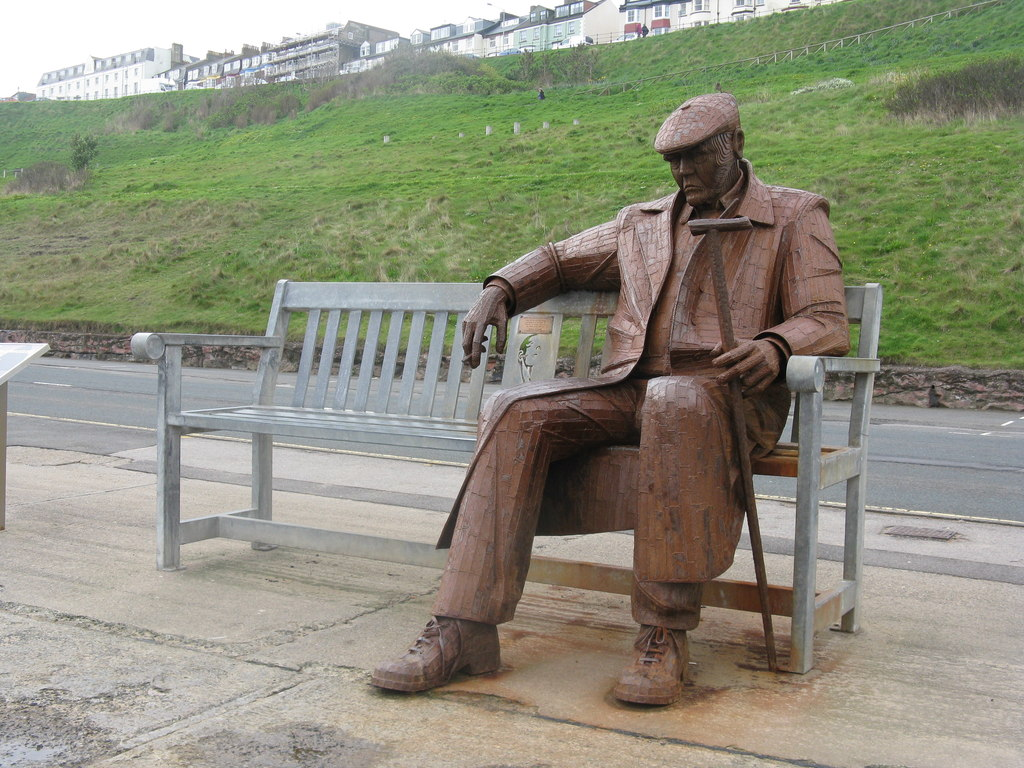
View from the front

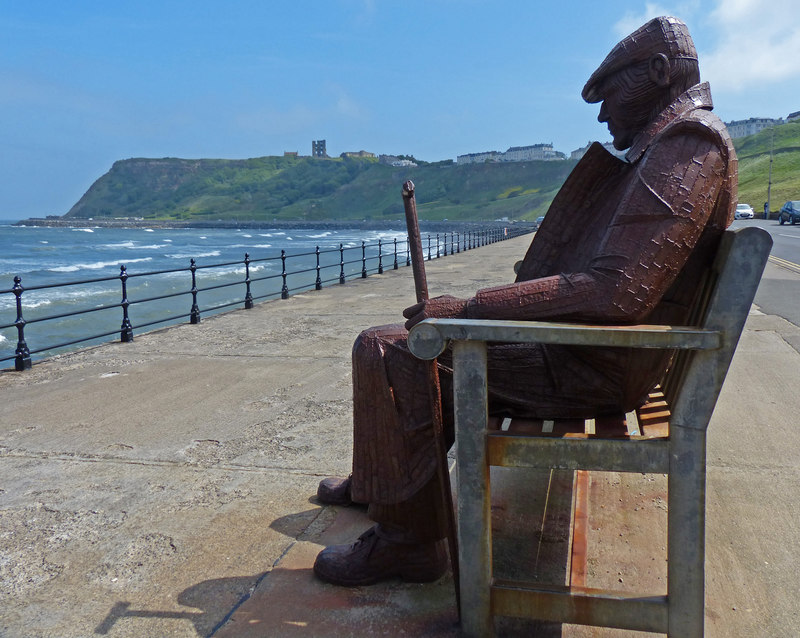
Side profile

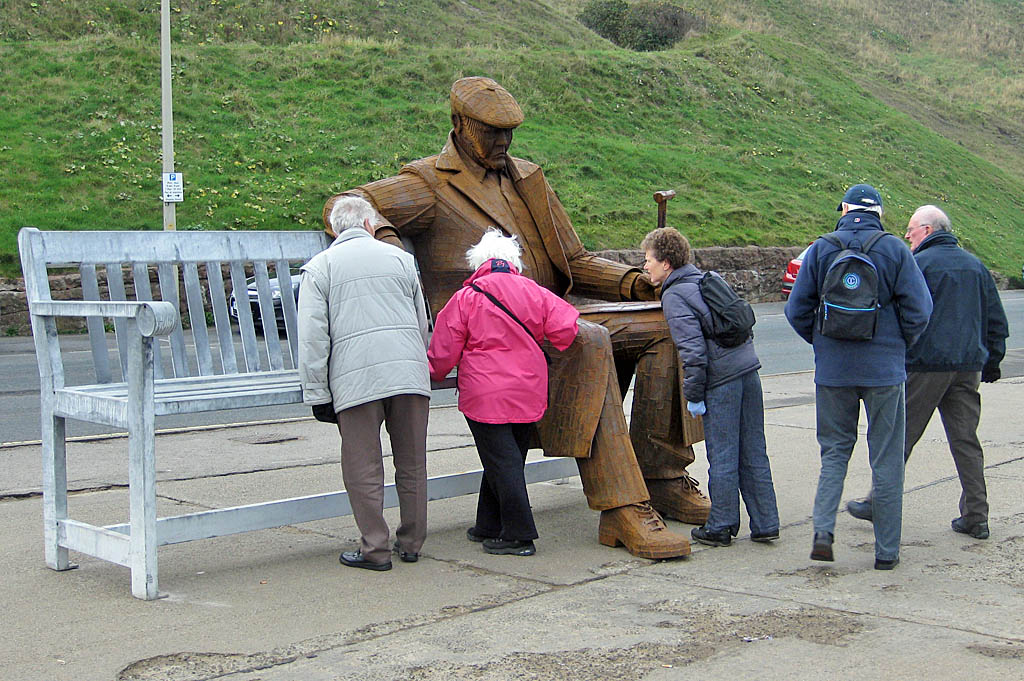
With visitors, showing the scale of the piece

Freddie Gilroy and the Belsen Stragglers is a statue by sculptor Ray Lonsdale which overlooks North Bay of Scarborough, England. Made from weathering steel, the sculpture depicts Freddie Gilroy, a former soldier who participated in the liberation of Bergen-Belsen concentration camp, sitting on a bench in his old age. Gilroy was a friend of the sculptor and Lonsdale made the piece partly as a tribute to him, but also as a wider war and Holocaust memorial. Originally intended to sit on the seafront as a 4-week loan in 2011, a local resident donated money to purchase the sculpture for the town.

== Description ==
Gilroy and the bench are sculpted at twice lifescale, making the figure almost 11 feet (3.5 m) in length. The sculpture, fabricated of weathering Corten steel, took artist Lonsdale three months to make. Gilroy, a South Hetton brickmaker and colliery worker, served with the Royal Artillery during the Second World War and became one of the first Allied troops to help liberate Bergen-Belsen concentration camp in April 1945. He died in November 2008.

Lonsdale created the sculpture as a commercial piece but also as a memorial to Gilroy and soldiers in general. The sculpture contains no mention of the connection with Belsen or the war, and at first appearance is just an old man sitting on a bench. Gilroy occupies one seat on the bench which, despite its height, offers visitors an opportunity to sit next to him. A plaque is placed in the front centre of the bench, in common with memorial benches elsewhere on the seafront. Text on the plaque includes a poem written by Lonsdale:

"Freddie Gilroy and the Belsen Stragglers"

They said for king and country
we should do as we were bid
They said old soldiers never die -
but plenty young ones did

Sculpture by Ray Lonsdale
in association with Artsbank (Saltburn)

Victoria Nesfield of the University of York, in her review of the piece said that "it occupies an unusual place between memorialization and art". She noted that by offering a space for people to sit and pose with Gilroy Lonsdale has created a sculpture unlike most other holocaust memorials. The term "Belsen stragglers" is a phrase used at the time of the liberation to describe the survivors of the camp. The sculpture has been described as "much loved by people in the town".

== History ==
The sculpture was installed on Royal Albert Drive, Scarborough in a position overlooking the town's North Bay in November 2011. The installation was initially supposed to be a 4-week exhibition provided via the Artsbank initiative, which promotes local artists through short-term loans. The sculpture proved popular and a local appeal was set up to raise £50,000 to purchase the sculpture for the town. In December a local resident, Maureen Robinson donated £50,000 to the appeal, from her life savings. Robinson dedicated the gift to her husband Michael to mark their wedding anniversary on 19 December. The sculpture is now owned by Scarborough Borough Council and is considered a local landmark.

At around 8:00 p.m. on 26 January 2012 the sculpture was vandalised with yellow gloss paint. Due to the Belsen connection and for occurring on the eve of Holocaust Memorial Day an anti-Semitic motive was considered possible. The paint was removed by a council team on the day after the attack.

Later in 2012 an explanatory plaque was added nearby. Also in 2012 Lonsdale proposed that the piece be moved to a position overlooking South Bay near to the Rotunda Museum, as it was suffering corrosion from sea water in rough weather. The move was planned for January 2013. Despite this, the sculpture remained in its original location on Royal Albert Drive. It is now subject to an annual cleaning process with oil used to remove rust and restore sheen.

Some of Lonsdale's other works are also located in the town, including The Tunney on Marine Drive, South Bay; The Smuggler's Apprentice on Merchant's Row, South Bay; A High Tide in Short Wellies in Filey and Pull Don't Push in Dalby Forest. Another of Lonsdale's works, 1101, known popularly as Tommy, depicting a First World War soldier is in Seaham, County Durham.

== See also ==
- The Ballad of Sophia Constable, a statue by Ray Lonsdale of the youngest prisoner of HM Prison Northallerton
- Tommy, a Ray Lonsdale statue at Seaham depicting a First World War soldier
