= Tommy (statue) =

2014 sculpture by Ray Lonsdale

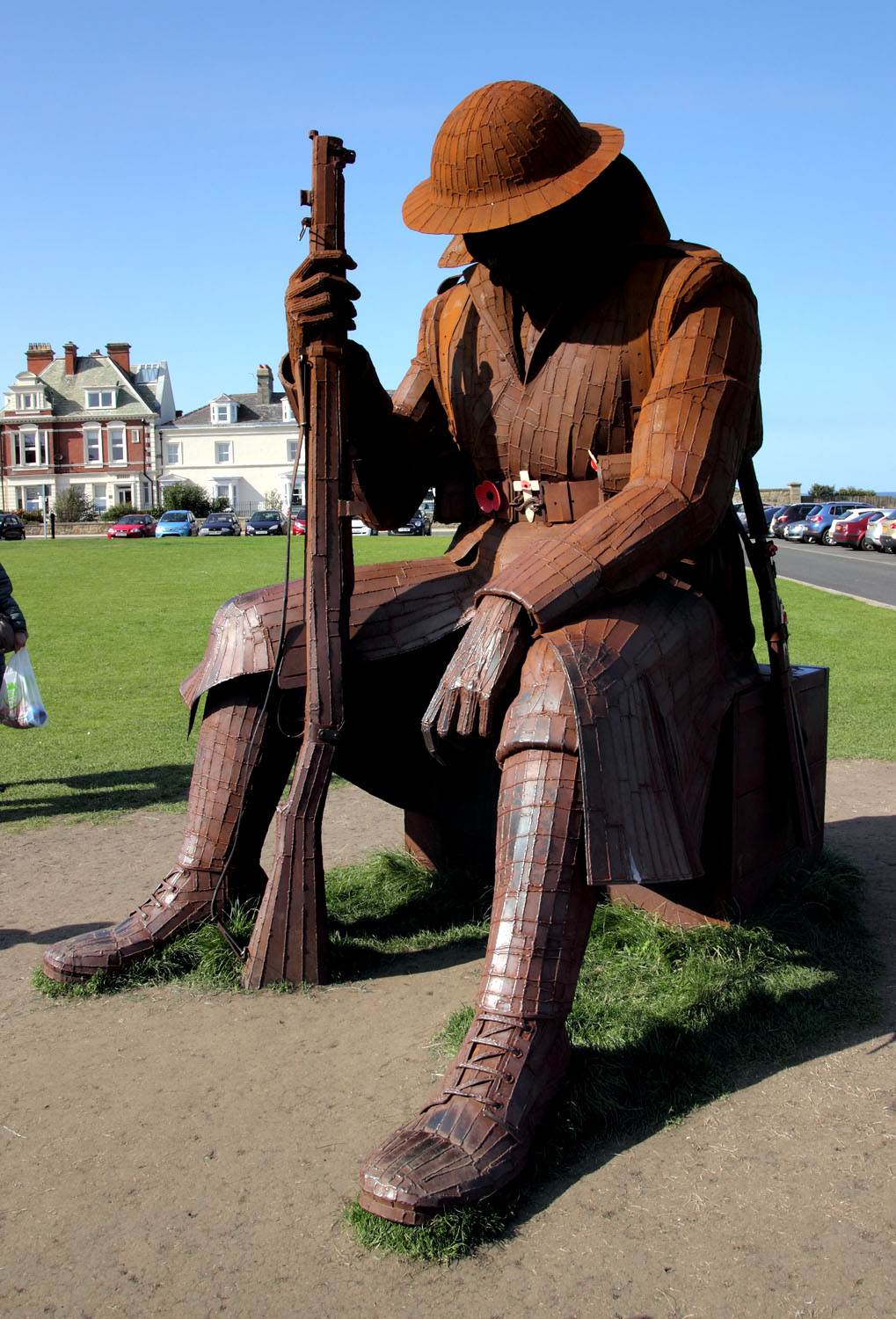
Tommy statue in Seaham

Tommy is a statue of a First World War soldier by artist Ray Lonsdale, displayed close to Seaham war memorial, on Terrace Green by the seafront in Seaham, County Durham, in North East England.

The corten steel statue weighs 1.2 tonnes (1.2 long tons; 1.3 short tons) and is 9 feet 5 inches (2.87 m) tall, with a rusty red patina. It depicts a First World War soldier, wearing boots, puttees, greatcoat and tin hat, sitting on an ammunition box, with downcast eyes, holding the barrel of his grounded rifle in his right hand. It is officially named 1101 (or Eleven-O-One), referring to the first minute of peace as the armistice came into force at 11am on 11 November 1918, but is more popularly known as Tommy, referring to the archetype private soldier Tommy Atkins.

It was displayed temporarily in Seaham from May 2014, but became a permanent fixture after a committee of local residents raised £102,000 needed to buy it. The price was handed over on 4 August 2014, the centenary of the outbreak of the First World War. The statue was relocated onto a paved platform in 2015, under which was buried a time capsule containing donated items, including a letter from Ray Lonsdale, a T-shirt, children's artworks, war remembrances, and a Victory Medal.

The word Tommy can also refer to any other statue representing a First World War soldier, usually made of bronze, steel or concrete.

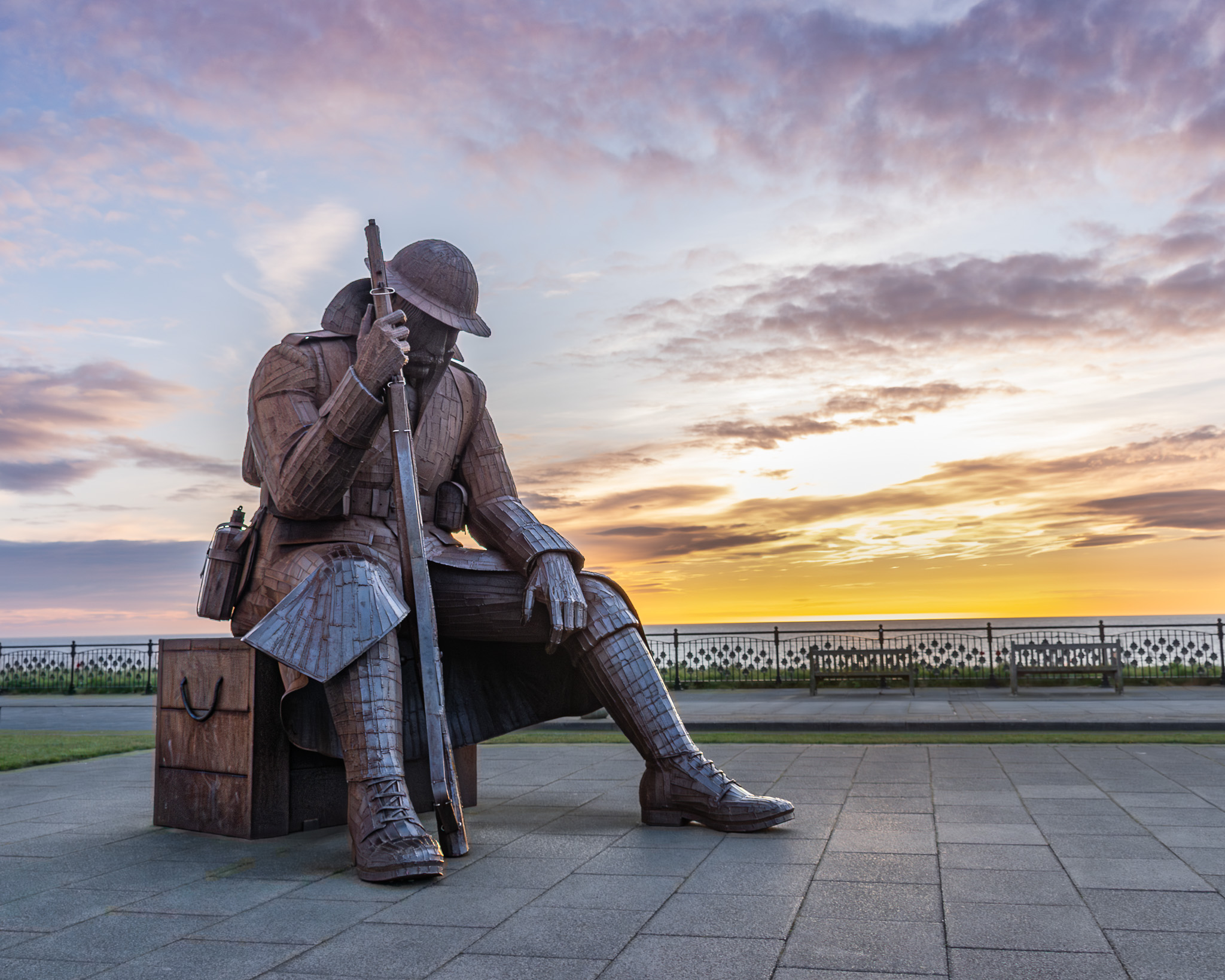
The Tommy Statue at sunrise

== See also ==
- Freddie Gilroy and the Belsen Stragglers, a statue of a Second World War soldier by Ray Lonsdale, installed at Scarborough in 2011
- The Ballad of Sophia Constable, a statue by Ray Lonsdale of the youngest prisoner of HM Prison Northallerton
