= The Ballad of Sophia Constable =

Statue by Ray Lonsdale in Yorkshire, England

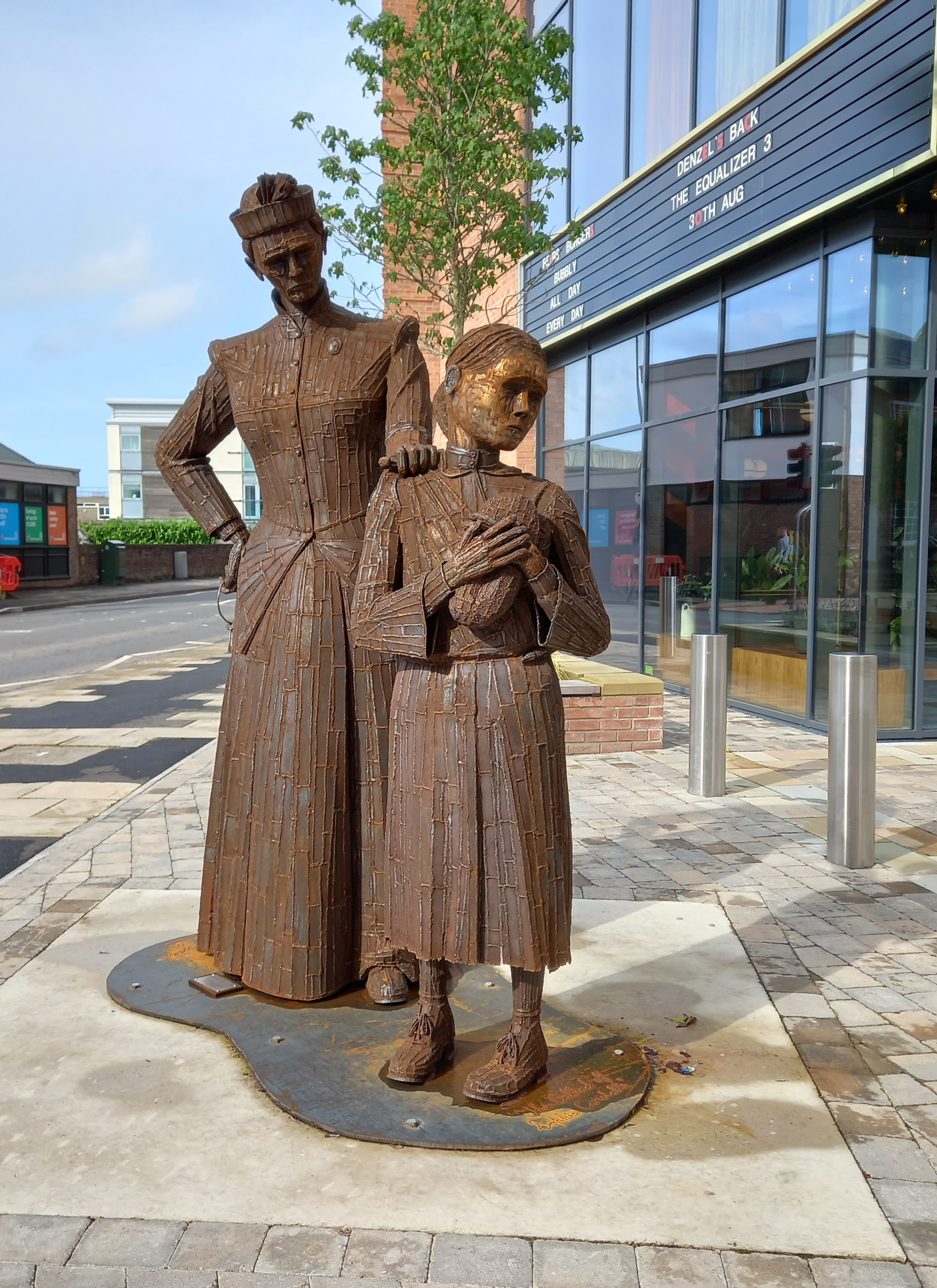
- Artist: Ray Lonsdale
- Year: 2023
- Medium: Steel
- Subject: Sophia Constable, the youngest female inmate to be incarcerated at HM Prison Northallerton
- Dimensions: 244 cm (96 in)
- Location: Northallerton
- 54.3389°N 1.4316°W
- Owner: North Yorkshire Council
- Accession: DL6_HJC_S085

The Ballad of Sophia Constable is a statue by sculptor Ray Lonsdale in Northallerton, Yorkshire, England, situated at the former site of HM Prison Northallerton. It depicts the youngest female inmate to be incarcerated there, imprisoned for stealing a loaf of bread in 1872.

== Background ==
Constable was imprisoned at HM Prison Northallerton for three weeks' hard labour in 1873 – its youngest female prisoner – for stealing a loaf of bread worth three pence from a shop in Whitby. The alleged offence took place on 12 October 1872, and the loaf belonged to Thomas Macintosh. Constable said that her crime was motivated by hunger. The case was dealt with at the North Riding Quarter Sessions in Northallerton on 31 December 1872, when Constable and Fanny Goodchild, a single woman aged twenty, were found guilty of obtaining the loaf under false pretences after both had pleaded guilty. Goodchild was sentenced to one month's imprisonment. Constable received three weeks' imprisonment, to be followed by four years in a Reformatory. One newspaper said three months, but the term of three weeks is confirmed by the Return sent to the Home Office. The sentencing was by a bench of magistrates chaired by J. R. W. Hildyard, of the Hall, Hutton Bonville, Northallerton.

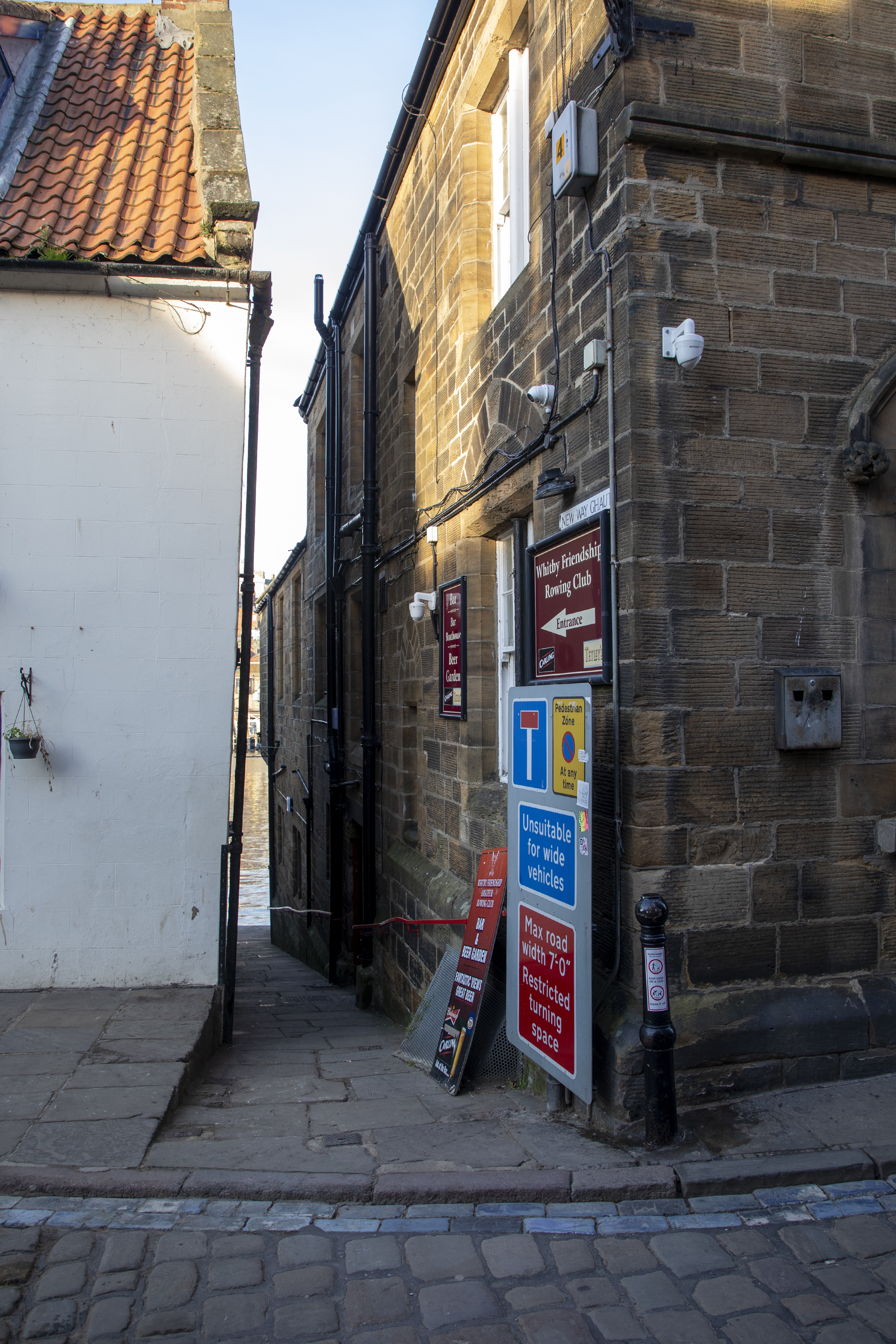
New Way Ghaut, Whitby, in 2021, a narrow alley where Constable lived for many years

A report on 2 January in the Yorkshire Post and Leeds Intelligencer, which did not give the women's names, quoted a magistrate as calling the offence at Whitby of "obtaining by false pretences a threepenny loaf of bread" as a "trivial offence". As imprisonment of "the two women" was likely to cost the North Riding the sum of £20 (equivalent to £1,880 in 2025), he suggested that a change in the law was needed.

The Richmond & Ripon Chronicle repeated these comments on 4 January.

At the time of the 1881 United Kingdom census, Constable was unmarried, aged 20, and had a one-year-old daughter, Sarah. They were living in New Way Ghaut, Whitby, with her mother and her step-father, a chimneysweep. The daughter was noted in the 1901 census as "Deaf and Dumb from childhood" and was then a dressmaker, living in Whitby with her mother and stepfather.

On 23 December 1888, at Whitby's parish church, Constable married John Leppington, a labourer, the son of a blacksmith. She gave her father's name as Thomas Constable, a horse-dealer. In March 1904, still in New Way Ghaut, Sophia and John Leppington had one son, John George.

She died at Whitby in 1932, aged 70.

== Description ==
The Ballad of Sophia Constable, by artist Ray Lonsdale, depicts an 11-year-old girl, Sophia Constable, holding a loaf of bread while a prison warder places her hand on Sophia's shoulder. It measures around 244 cm (96 in) in height and is situated at the former site of Northallerton Prison, now the Treadmills commercial development.

The statue was installed in 2023, 150 years after Constable's imprisonment. It is a work in steel by sculptor Ray Lonsdale, and is in the collection of North Yorkshire Council, costing £85,000. It was funded by nearly £49,000 tax receipts, a £30,000 grant and £6,000 private sector contribution.

Lonsdale said in an interview with ITV reporter Tom Barton that the only known photo of Constable is a mugshot, and that was the main source material on which he based the statue. He has said that the statue shows Constable looking towards the prison and is a reminder of "how harsh life was then".

The statue was approved at a Hambleton District Council meeting in April 2023, when one councillor compared the story to that of Jean Valjean in the Victor Hugo novel Les Misérables.

The unveiling of the statue in September 2023 was attended by Constable's great-granddaughter Louise Dudman. She told ITV News that after her imprisonment, Constable moved back to Whitby, married and had children, Dudman adding that she "turned her life around" and made something positive from a bad situation.

== See also ==
- Freddie Gilroy and the Belsen Stragglers, a Ray Lonsdale statue at Scarborough depicting a former Second World War soldier
- Tommy, a Ray Lonsdale statue at Seaham depicting a First World War soldier
