= Ray Lonsdale =

British sculptor (born 1965)

Ray Lonsdale (born 1965) is a British steel fabricator and sculptor, whose artwork can be found across towns and villages in Durham, England.

== Gallery ==
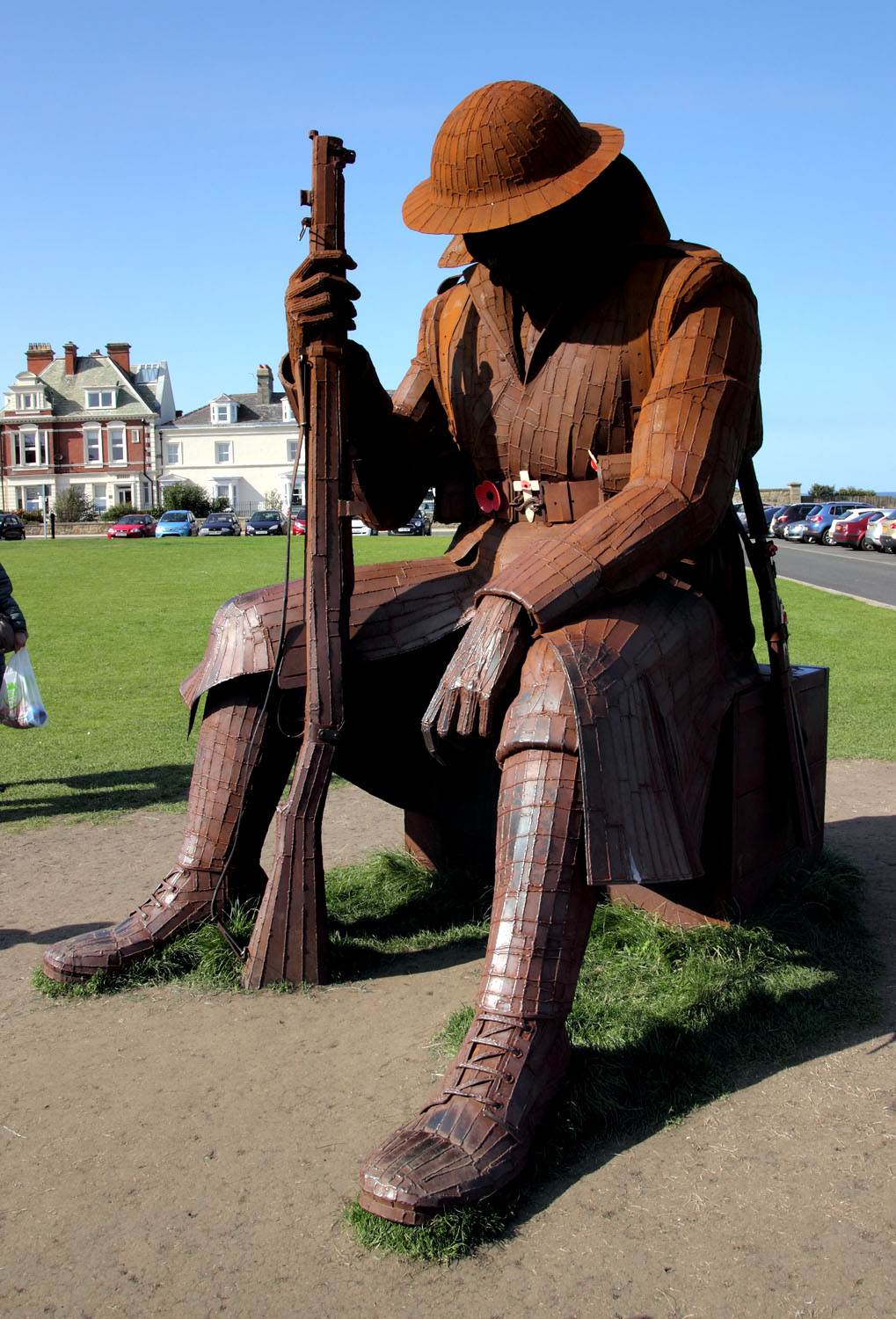
Tommy (Seaham)

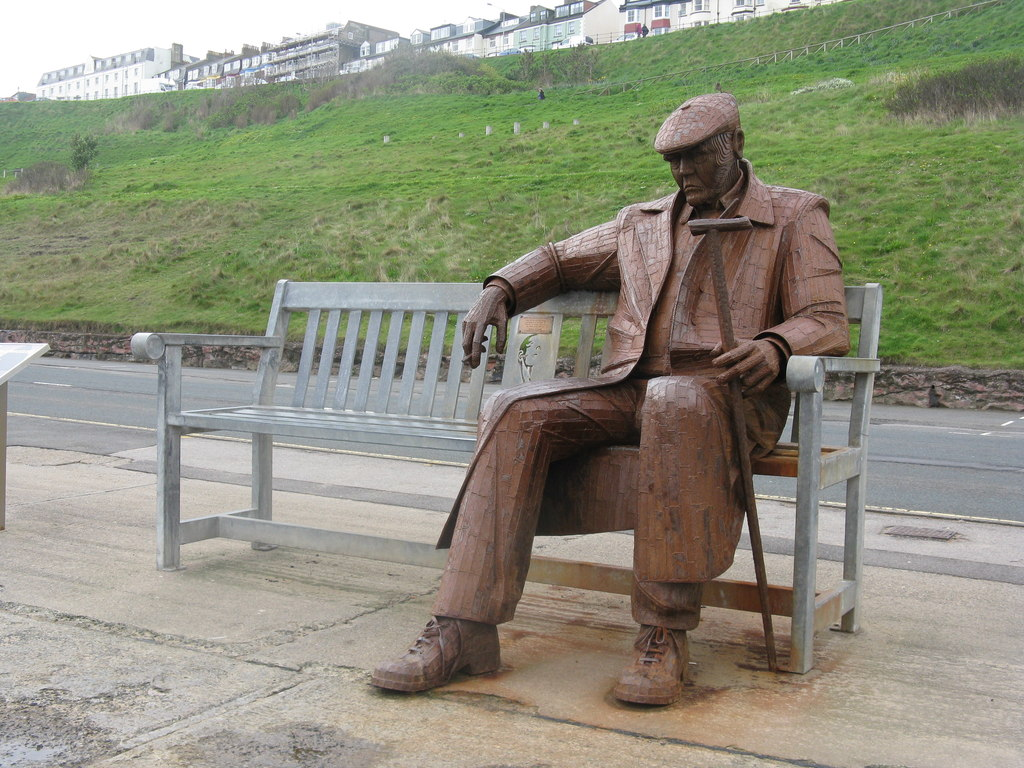
Freddie Gilroy and the Belsen Stragglers (Scarborough)

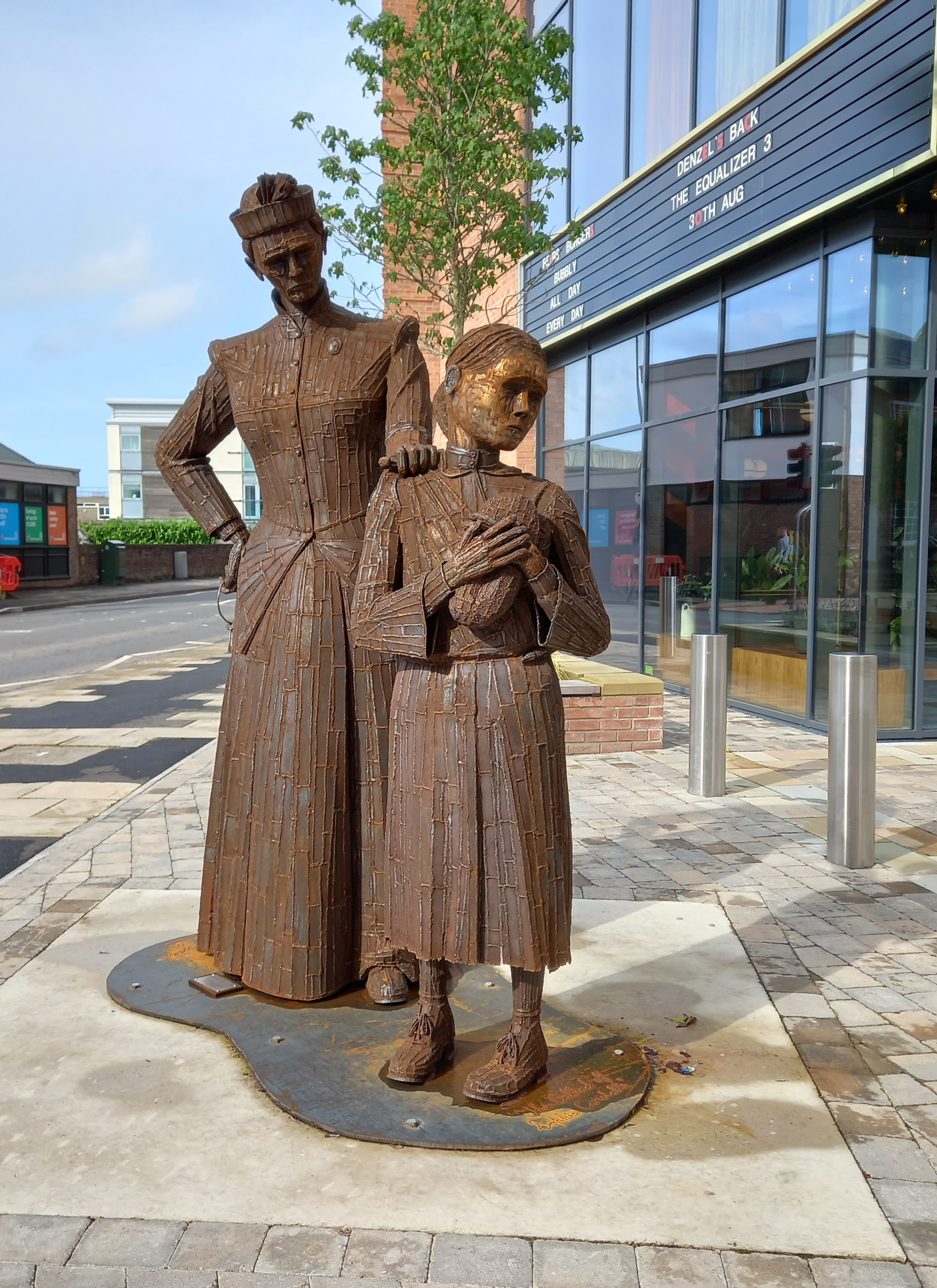
The Ballad of Sophia Constable (Northallerton)

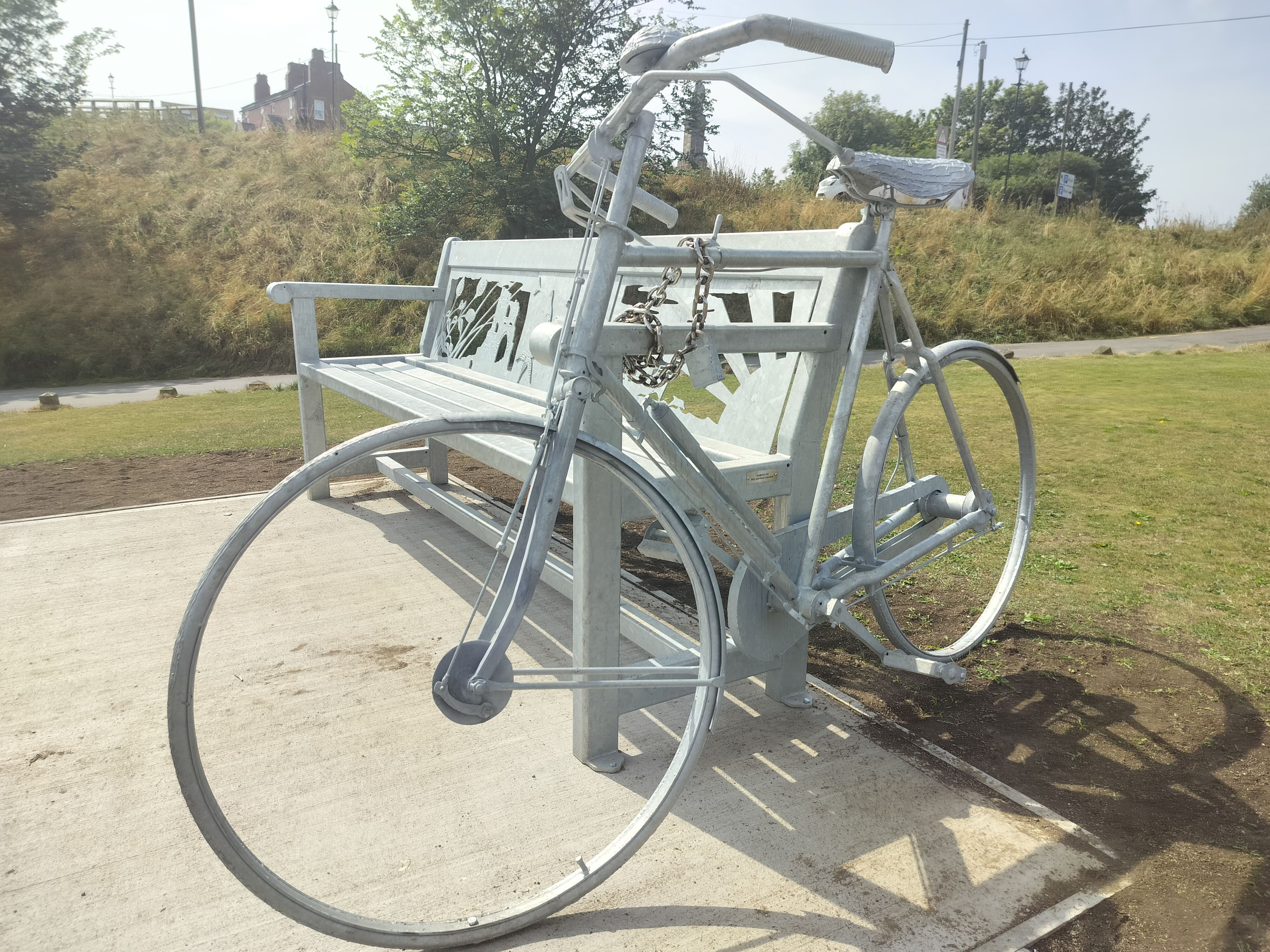
Life's Adventure (Tynemouth)
