= HM Prison Northallerton =

Former prison in Northallerton, North Yorkshire, England

Coordinates: 54°20′19″N 1°25′51″W

HMP Northallerton
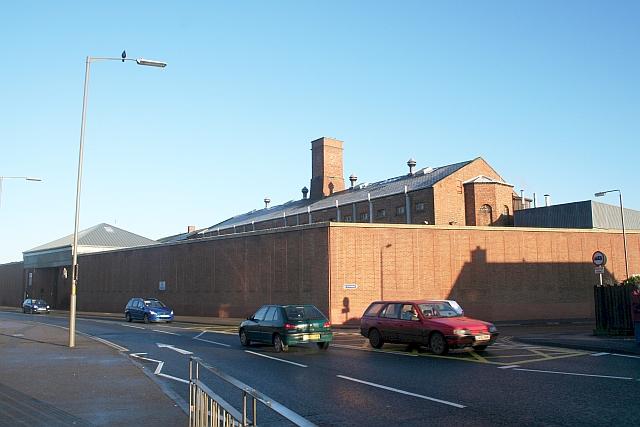
- Interactive map of HMP Northallerton
- Location: Northallerton, North Yorkshire
- Security class: Young Offenders Institution
- Population: 252 (December 2007)
- Opened: 1788
- Closed: 2014
- Managed by: HM Prison Services
- Governor: Chris Dyer
- Website: Website (archived)

HM Prison Northallerton was a prison in Northallerton, North Yorkshire, England. It operated from 1788 until December 2013. During that time, it variously housed male and female adult prisoners, women with children, youth offenders, and military prisoners. Latterly Her Majesty's Prison Service struggled to keep the old prison operating to modern standards, and citing the costs of doing so and the relatively small size of the institution, it closed the prison in 2014. The prison was bought by Hambleton District Council, which redeveloped the site into an entertainment and retail precinct.

== History ==
In 1783, the Justices of the North Riding of Yorkshire decided to close the existing house of correction in Thirsk and replace it with a larger custom-built facility in nearby Northallerton. The Diocese of Durham donated an area of marshland east of the town's High Street. Prolific Yorkshire architect and engineer John Carr was engaged to design the new prison - Carr designed a quadrangle of four buildings, although at first only one was constructed. This initial jail (which cost 3,411 pounds 3 shillings and 11 pence) opened in 1788. The building had twelve cells for men and five for women (although a number of prisoners slept in each cell). A courthouse was added on the north side in 1800 - it was connected to the jail by a tunnel. When James Neild visited the prison (then called Northallerton Bridewell) in September 1802 it held 15 prisoners.

The prison's female wing was built on the quadrangle's east side in 1818, and the prison Governor's house and two further wings were added in the 1820s. Treadmills were installed in the 1820s; at one time Northallerton had the largest treadmill in the world. Two new wings, both three-storey, were built in the early 1850s.

The prison was closed in 1922 and the premises mothballed. On the outbreak of World War II it was transferred to the British Army for use as a storage depot and later a training facility for Royal Military Police officers. In 1943 the army began using the site as a "glasshouse", a military prison. In 1946 some prisoners, aggrieved that the end of the war had not led to the remission of their sentences, rioted, damaging the cell block and throwing roof slates into the street.

In 1964 the prison became a Young Offenders Institution.

The courthouse, which had been superseded by a modern building on Racecourse Lane, was demolished in 1989.

In May 2003, a report by Her Majesty's Chief Inspector of Prisons commended Northallerton Prison for its improvement. Previously inspection reports had highlighted problems with bullying, poor sanitation and lack of exercise facilities at the jail. The report noted improvements in these areas but called on Northallerton to do more to help resettle offenders in the community. However, a further inspection report in April 2006 found that some shared cells at Northallerton were unhygienic and unfit for purpose. The report also raised concerns over the insufficient education and work opportunities for inmates at the prison. The cells in the two main wings were unusually small, and housed two inmates in bunk beds per cell. Each cell contained an unscreened toilet, and inmates were required to eat all their meals in their cells. Local magistrate John Bacon described these arrangements as "a disgrace".

In 2010 the prison became a community jail for low-risk adult male offenders (category C and D).

Before closure, the regime at Northallerton revolved mainly around the education and physical education departments and preparation for release via employment search. Northallerton had a Level 2 Health Care Centre with no in-patient facilities. There was a daily doctor's surgery and a weekly dental facility, and also a consultant psychiatric service.

On 4 September 2013, the Ministry of Justice announced that it intended to close Northallerton Prison by the end of 2013. The prison was formally closed in January 2014.

== Redevelopment ==
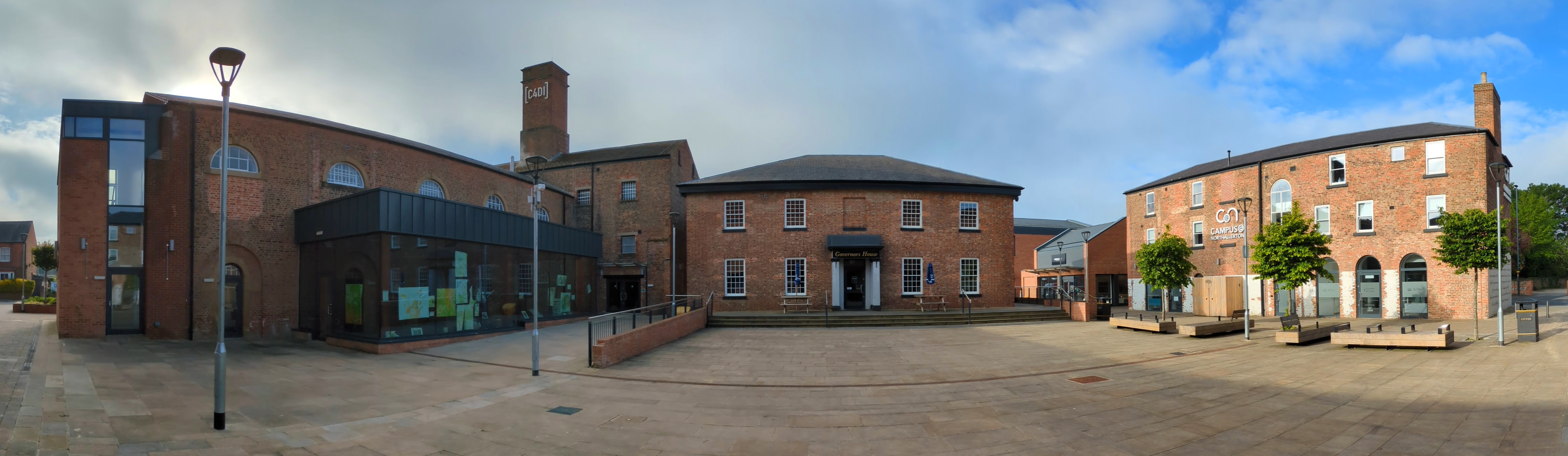
The Quadrangle, three of the historic prison buildings which were retained in the redevelopment

In April 2015 the 3.4-acre (1.4-hectare) prison site and its buildings were bought by Hambleton District Council for £1.4 million. The site is now part of a masterplan for Northallerton which includes the development of new homes, shops, leisure and education facilities. During July 2015, the council ran public tours of the prison site. Demolition began in October 2016 and was complete by the following summer. Of more than a dozen buildings on the prison site, five are listed buildings — these were retained. After the demolitions were complete, archeologists from York Archaeological Trust spent a month excavating on the site.

Hambleton District Council partnered with Hull-based property development company Wykeland Group to form the Central Northallerton Development Company to redevelop the site. The new development will be called Treadmills. The first phase will be anchored by a 21,000 square feet (2,000 m^{2}) Lidl shop, with 6,000 square feet (560 m^{2}) of other retail units and 130 parking spaces. Redevelopment work was planned to start in 2018, with the first phase completed by late 2019. Work on the development continued in 2023.

The Treadmills site features a statue in steel, The Ballad of Sophia Constable, depicting the prison's youngest inmate. Sophia Constable was sentenced to three weeks' hard labour in 1873, to be followed by four years in a reformatory, for stealing a loaf of bread worth three pence from a shop in Whitby.

== See also ==
- Listed buildings in Northallerton
