= Seaham =

Seaside town in County Durham, England

Coordinates: 54.84°N 1.34°W

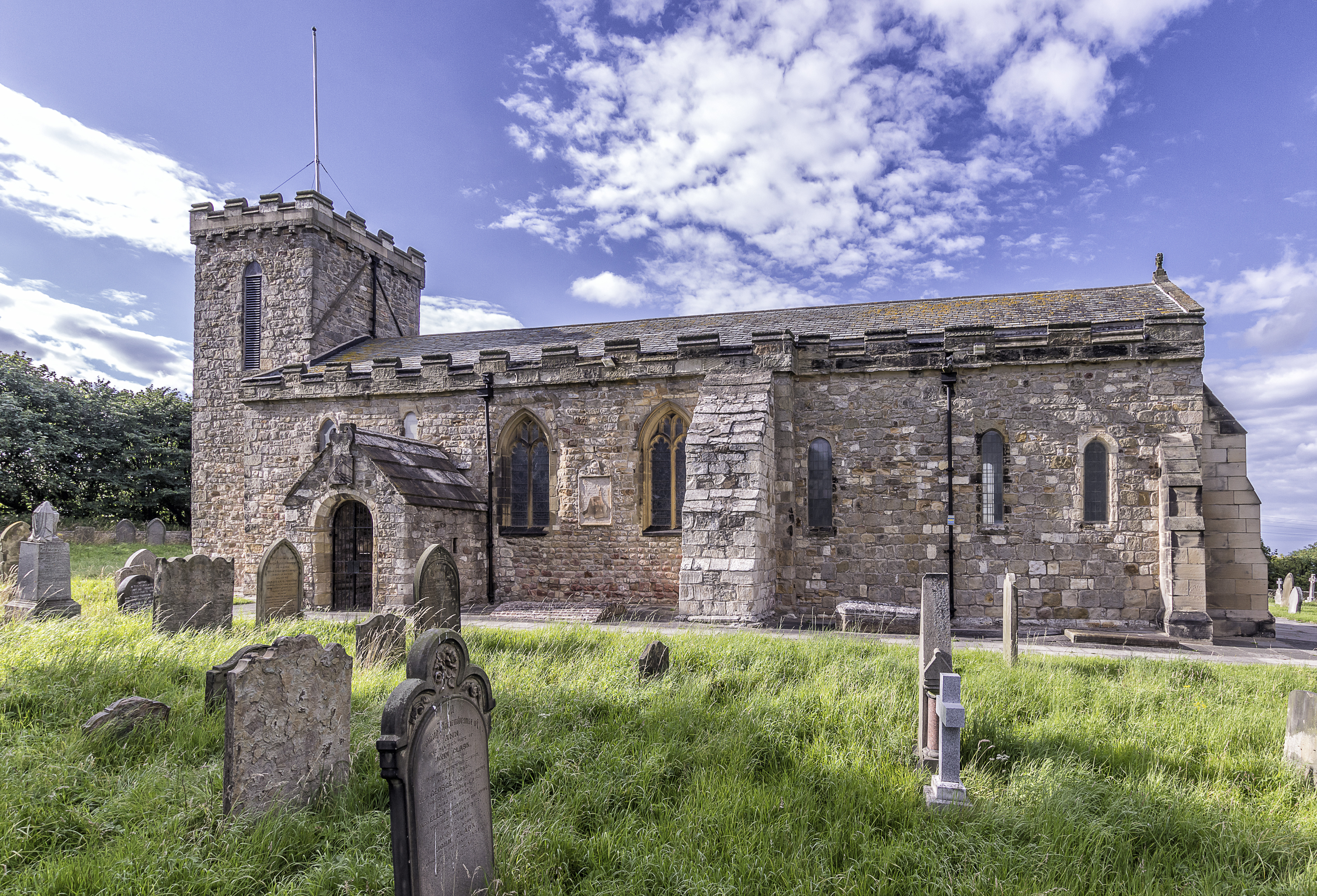
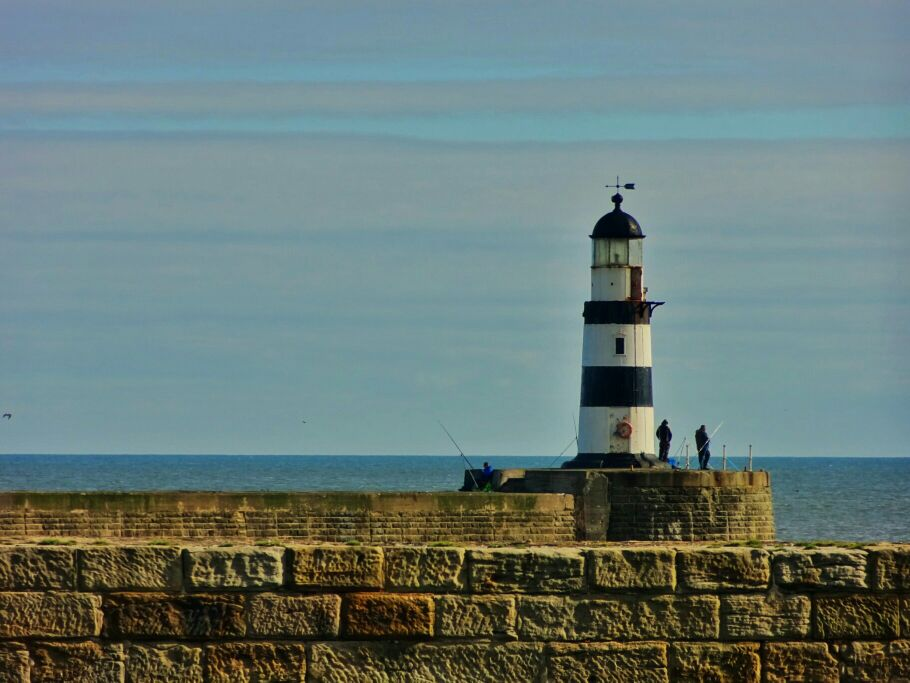
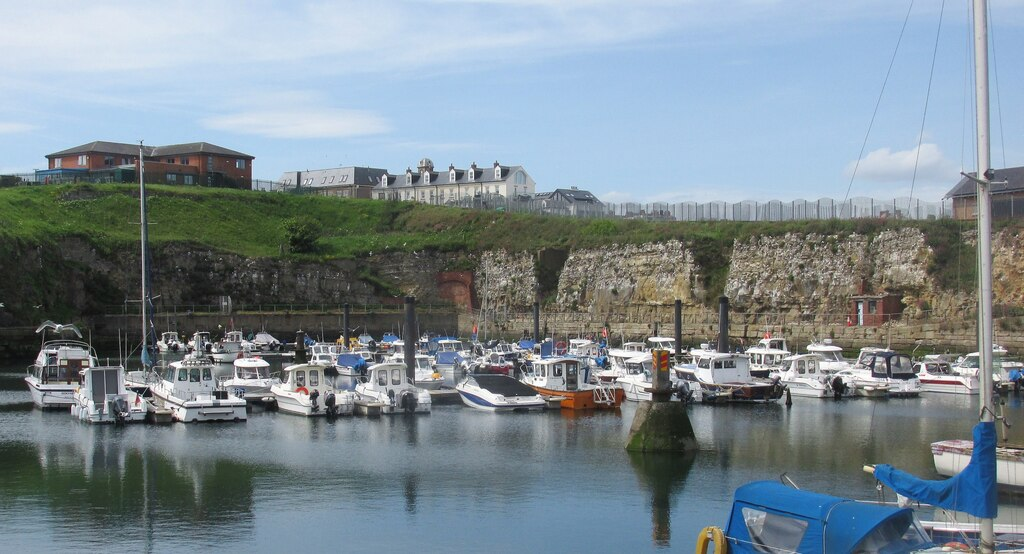
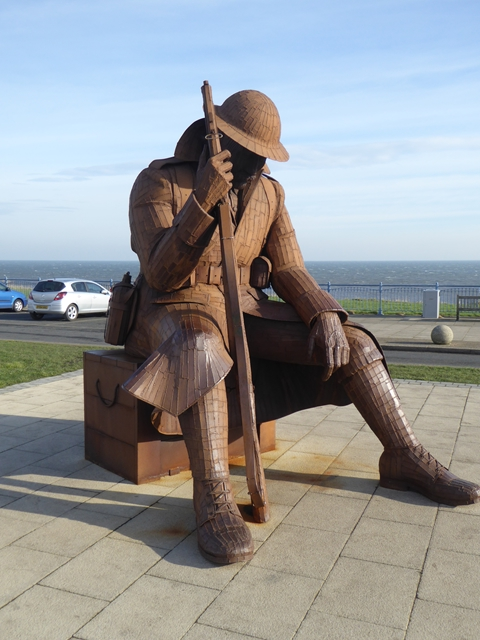
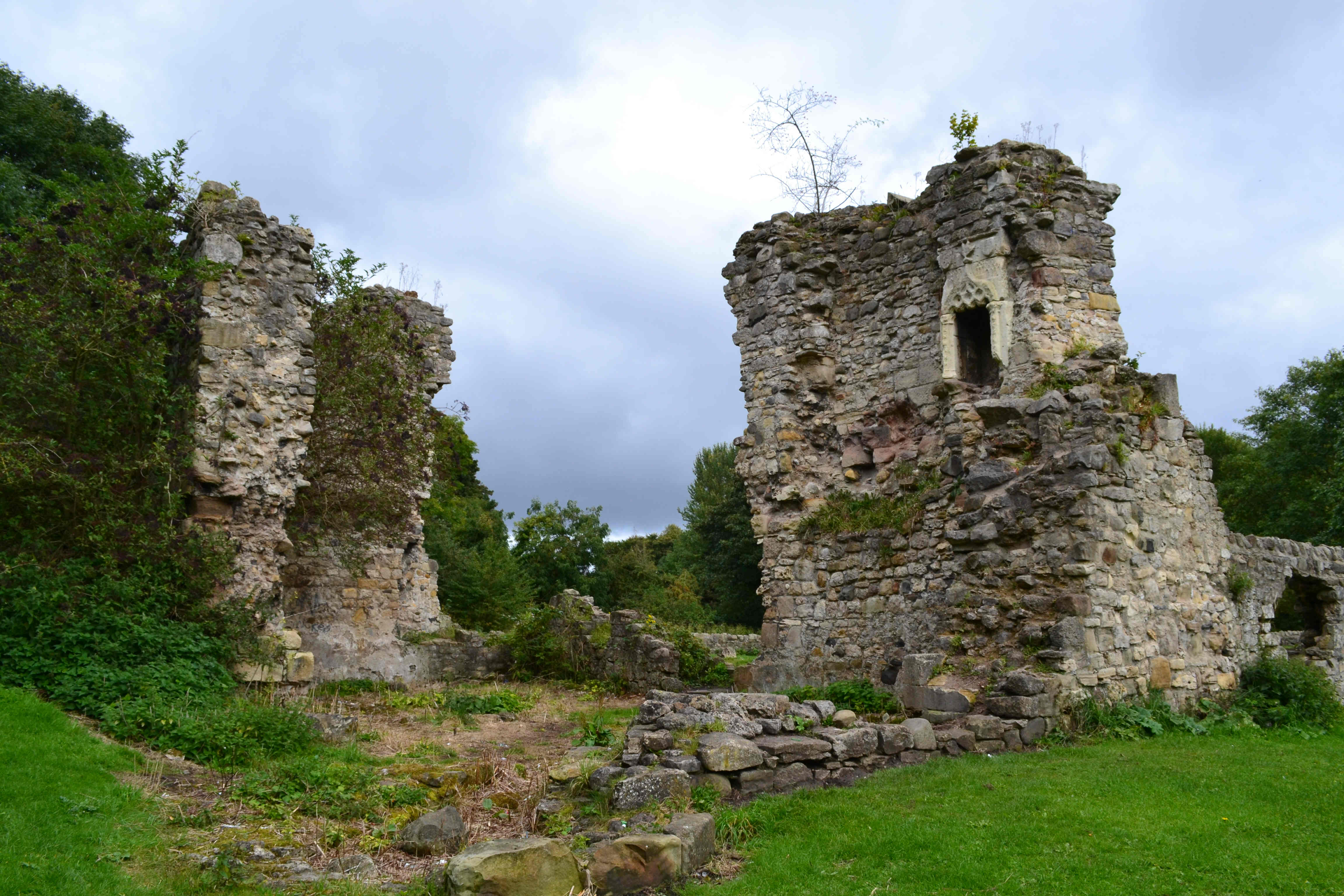
- St Mary’s Church The Lighthouse Seaham Marina Tommy Dalden Tower

- Location within County Durham
- Population: 20,172
- OS grid reference: NZ426496
- Civil parish: Seaham
- Unitary authority: County Durham
- Ceremonial county: County Durham
- Region: North East
- Country: England
- Sovereign state: United Kingdom
- Post town: SEAHAM
- Postcode district: SR7
- Dialling code: 0191
- Police: Durham
- Fire: County Durham and Darlington
- Ambulance: North East
- UK Parliament: Easington

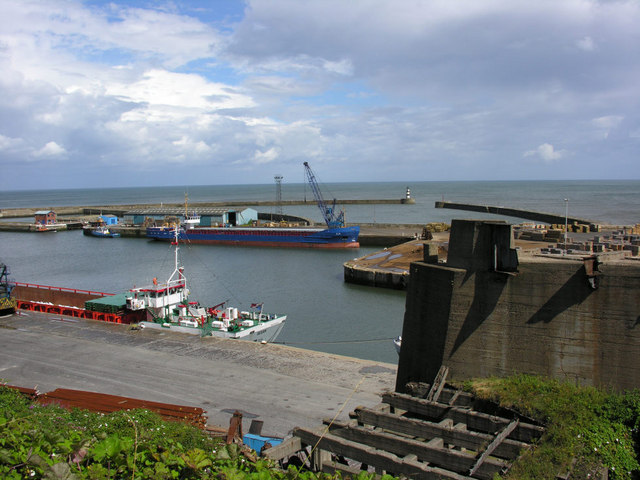
Seaham Harbour

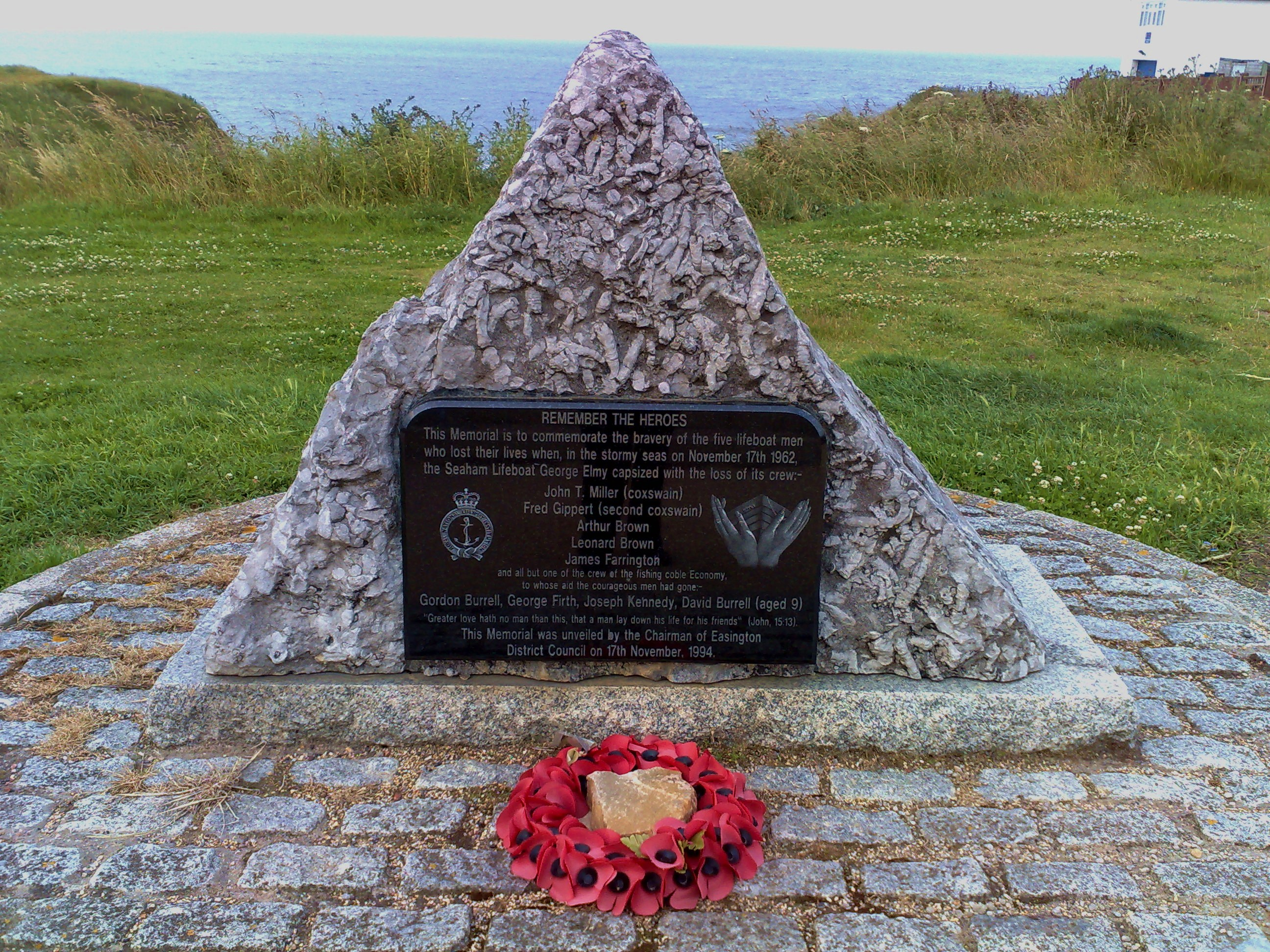
George Elmy Lifeboat Memorial

Seaham (/ˈsiːəm/ SEE-əm) is a seaside town in County Durham, England. Located on the Durham Coast, Seaham is situated 6 miles (10 kilometres) south of Sunderland and 13 miles (21 km) east of Durham. The town grew from the late 19th century onwards as a result of investments in its harbour and coal mines. The town is twinned with the German town of Gerlingen.

== History ==
The original village of Seaham has all but vanished; it lay between St Mary's Church and Seaham Hall (i.e. somewhat to the north of the current town centre). The parish church, St Mary the Virgin, has a nave that some experts believe may date from the 7th century, and that resembles the church at Escomb in many respects.

Until the early years of the 19th century, Seaham was a small rural agricultural farming community whose only claim to fame was that the local landowner's daughter, Anne Isabella Milbanke, was married at Seaham Hall to Lord Byron, on 2 January 1815. Byron began writing his Hebrew Melodies at Seaham and they were published in April 1815. It would seem that Byron was bored in wintry Seaham, though the sea enthralled him. As he wrote in a letter to a friend:

Upon this dreary coast we have nothing but county meetings and shipwrecks; and I have this day dined upon fish, which probably dined upon the crews of several colliers lost in the late gales. But I saw the sea once more in all the glories of surf and foam.

The marriage was short-lived, producing as its only child the mathematician Ada Lovelace, but it was long enough to have been a drain on the Milbanke estate. The area's fortunes changed when the Milbankes sold out in 1821 to the 3rd Marquess of Londonderry, who built a harbour, in 1828, to facilitate transport of goods from locally encouraged industries (the first coal mine was begun in 1845). However, this harbour later proved inadequate to deal with the millions of tonnes of coal and the 6th Marquess commissioned engineers Patrick Meik and Charles Meik to reclaim land and extend and deepen the dock. It was officially opened in 1905. The harbour is of particular interest because it consists of a series of interconnecting locks, rather than the more typical two wall construction.

As early as 1823, the 3rd Marquess had approached the architect John Dobson with a view to his drawing up plans for a town to be built around the harbour. Dobson did so, but the planned approach foundered for lack of funds, and the town instead grew in a more piecemeal fashion. To begin with, the town was itself called Seaham Harbour (to differentiate it from the ancient village); in time, though, the settlement as a whole came to be known as Seaham.

In 1853 John Candlish built the Londonderry Bottleworks in the town. It was the largest glass bottle works in Britain and survived until 1921. Candlish went on to become mayor and, in 1868, Liberal MP for Sunderland. Waste glass from the bottleworks was dumped at sea and is now washed up as glass pebbles, known as sea glass, on local beaches.

In 1928, production started at the last town colliery to be opened, Vane Tempest. By 1992, however, all three pits (Dawdon Colliery, Vane Tempest Colliery and Seaham Colliery – known locally as "the Knack") had closed, a process accelerated by the British miners' strike. The pit closures hit the local economy extremely hard.

Seaham Colliery suffered an underground explosion in 1880 which resulted in the loss of over 160 lives, including surface workers and rescuers.

Many local families were affected by the tragic loss of eight men and one boy in the 'Seaham Lifeboat Disaster', when the RNLI lifeboat, the George Elmy, foundered on 17 November 1962. To commemorate the event, the new coast road was named George Elmy Lifeboat Way.

== Governance and politics ==
An electoral ward with the same name exists. The population of this ward taken at the 2011 census was 8419.

Seaham is part of the Easington parliament constituency and is currently represented in the House of Commons of the Parliament of the United Kingdom by Labour Member of Parliament, Grahame Morris, who has served since the 2010 general election.

== Education ==
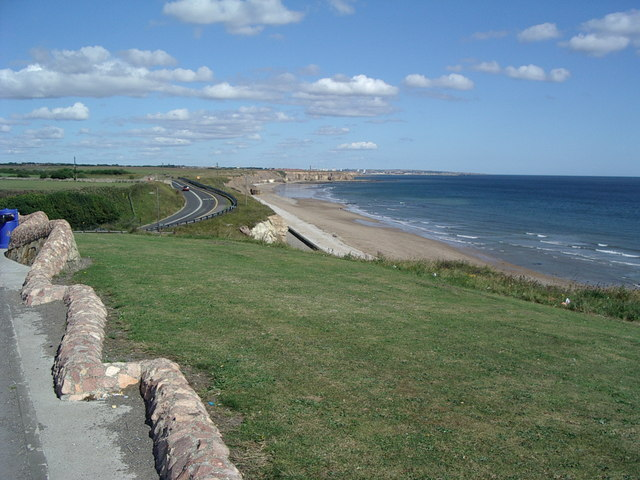
The coast at almost the northernmost point of Seaham, looking towards Sunderland

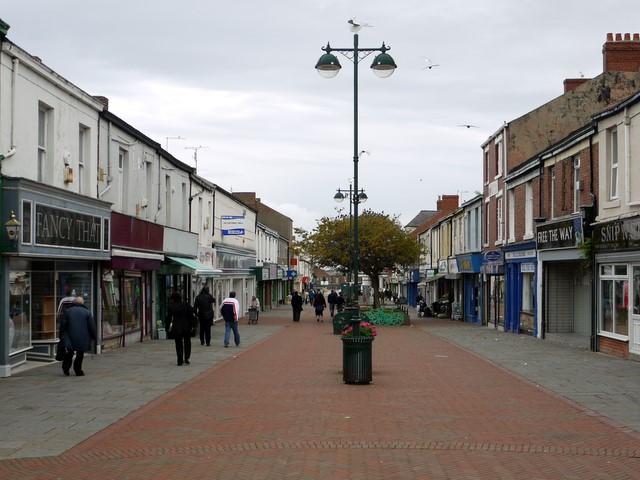
Church Street, Seaham town centre

Seaham has one secondary school, without a sixth-form, called Seaham High School (before 2016 known as Seaham School of Technology).

== Sport ==
Seaham's main football team is Seaham Red Star F.C., formerly Seaham Colliery Welfare Red Star, located near Seaham's Red Star park. The club plays in Northern League Division Two.

Seaham has three cricket clubs, Seaham Harbour Cricket Club, Seaham Park Cricket Club and Dawdon Welfare Cricket Club.

In the 2019-20 rugby season, Seaham RUFC were promoted from Durham/Northumberland 3 into Durham/Northumberland 2. The side won the Durham County Junior Cup in 2023 and 2025.

== Media coverage ==
The final scene of the 1971 film, Get Carter, was shot at Blackhall Rocks beach, which is down the coast from Seaham.

The rich mining history of the town was highlighted in the 2000 film Billy Elliot, which was set during the 1984–1985 United Kingdom miners' strike in the fictional County Durham town of Everington but which displayed characteristics particular to East Durham pit communities such as Seaham and Easington Colliery. Both towns feature as locations in the film, notably Dawdon Miners' Club, into which Elliot's dad runs when he learns his son has won an audition at dance school. Elliot's "angry dance" scene takes place in Dawdon between Embleton Street and Stavordale Street West.

The opening scene in Alien 3 (1992) was filmed on Blast Beach, at Dawdon. The town has also served as a location for the BAFTA nominated film Life For Ruth (1962) starring Janet Munro and Patrick McGoohan.

The town appeared in the BBC Three sitcom Live!Girls! present Dogtown which premiered on the channel in autumn 2006. According to the Sunderland Echo (11 February 1999), scenes from Saving Private Ryan (1998) were also going to be filmed in Seaham, but government intervention moved production elsewhere.

According to Tom McNee's 1992 portrait of the town The Changing Face of Seaham: 1928–1992, St. John's parish church was used as the setting of a 1985 service recorded for BBC Radio 3. Also, a two-part Channel 4 documentary profiled the town in 1991.

== Landmarks ==
To the south, beside the road to Dalton-le-Dale, are the remains of Dalden Tower, comprising the ruins of a 16th-century tower and fragments of later buildings.

The harbour itself may be said to be the principal landmark of the nineteenth-century town; though the Londonderry Institute in Tempest Road (1853-5 by Thomas Oliver) with its monumental Greek-style portico provides something of a glimpse of the Marquess's original vision for the town. Of a slightly later date, the former Londonderry Offices on the sea front once served as headquarters for the mining and other businesses of the Londonderry family. A statue of the 6th Marquess stands in the forecourt. Also dating from an early stage in the town's development is the town-centre church of St John, Seaham Harbour (1835–40). For the very much older St Mary's, Seaham, and its neighbour Seaham Hall, see above.

For just over a hundred years the harbour was towered over by a 58 ft (18 m) lighthouse on Red Acre Point, immediately to the north, designed by William Chapman. Erected in 1835, it displayed a fixed white light above a revolving red light (an unusual configuration, provided so as to distinguish it from the north pier light at Sunderland); both lights were displayed from the same tower, the upper being 100 feet (30 m) and the lower 54 feet (16 m) above mean sea level. The lighthouse was gas-lit, with an arrangement of third-order catadioptric lenses provided by Chance Brothers & Co. It was decommissioned in 1905, when the harbour was expanded and the current black-and-white striped pier-head light was constructed. Red Acre lighthouse was left standing, however, to serve as a daymark, until 1940 when the whole structure was swiftly demolished in case it should serve to assist enemy navigators.

A steel statue, 1101 (locally also known as Tommy) by local artist Ray Lonsdale, commemorating World War One and initially erected temporarily for three months, was the subject of a local fund-raising drive in 2014 to retain it on the town's seafront.

The open area at the north end of Seaham on the B1287 adjacent to the Seaham Hall Beach Car Park has been designated a Mole Sanctuary with a plaque stating "Famous Moles" added to the carpark road sign. The history of this designation is uncertain though a high number of mole hills are observable.

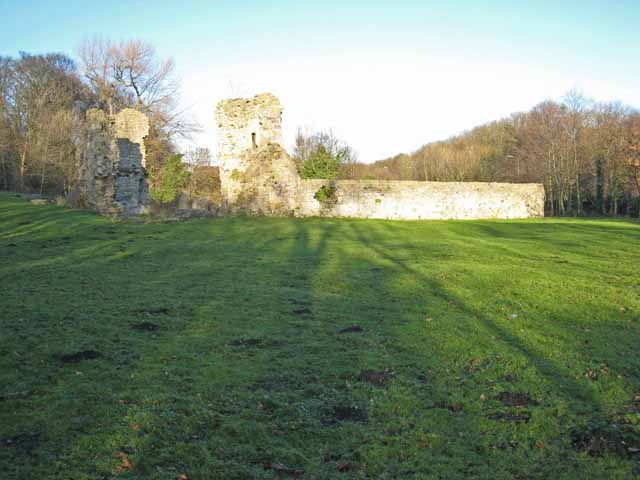
Dalden Tower, in nearby Dalden Dene

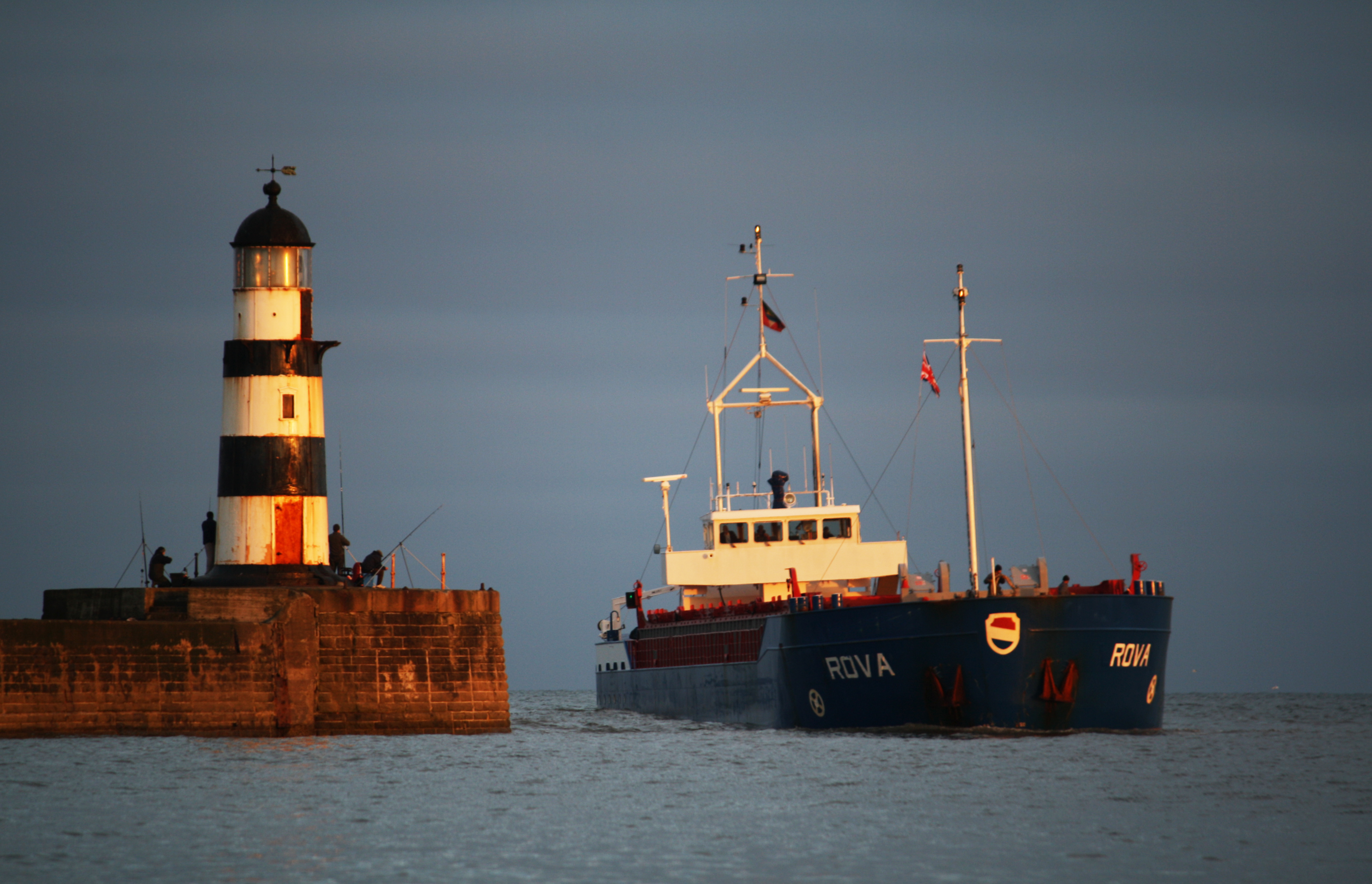
Lighthouse on the harbour breakwater

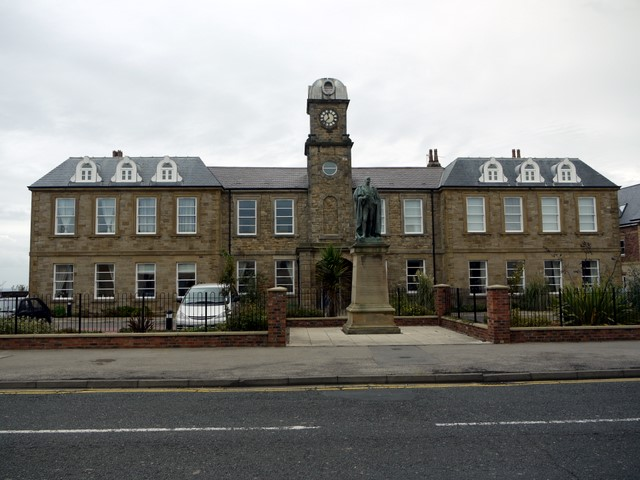
The former Londonderry Offices

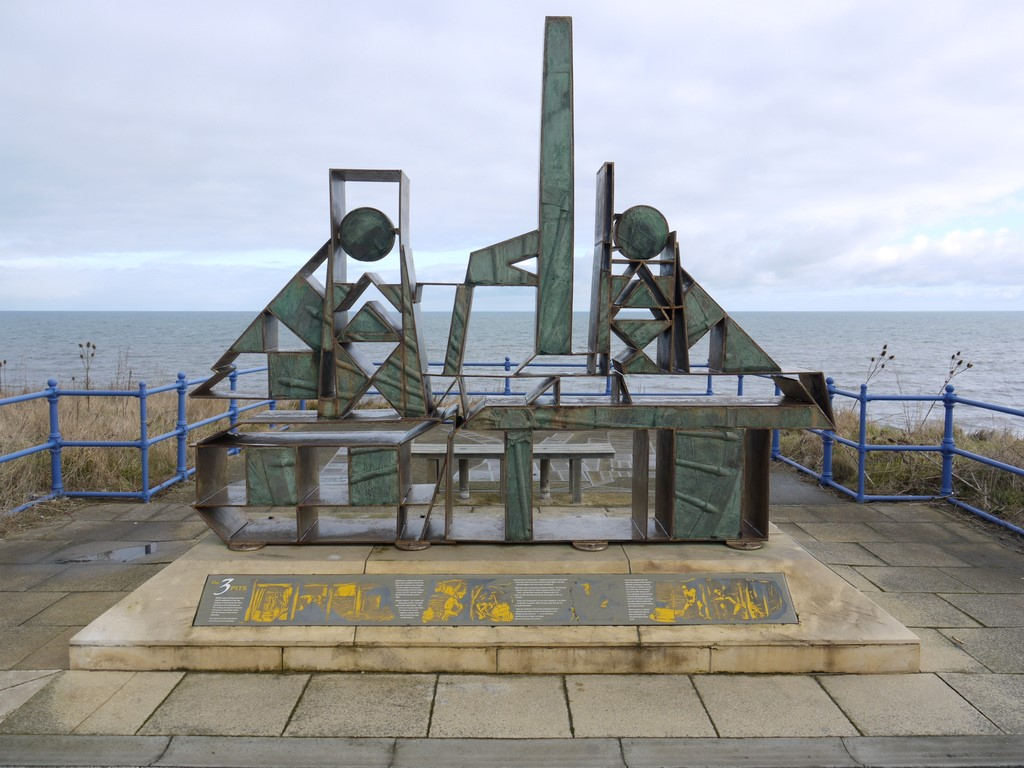
Artwork on the site of Vane Tempest Colliery

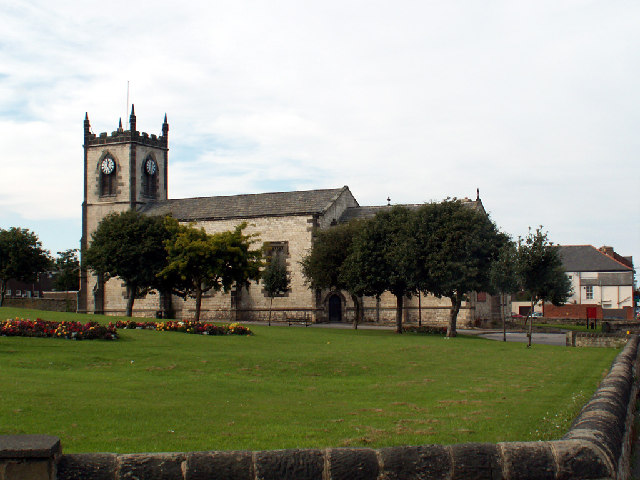
St John's Church, in the town centre

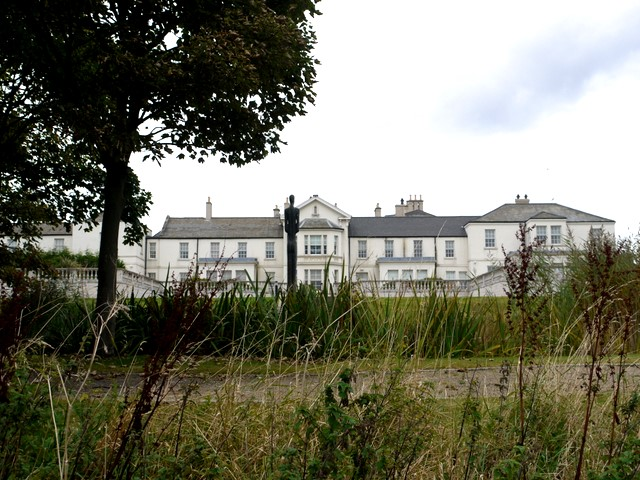
Seaham Hall, viewed from the south

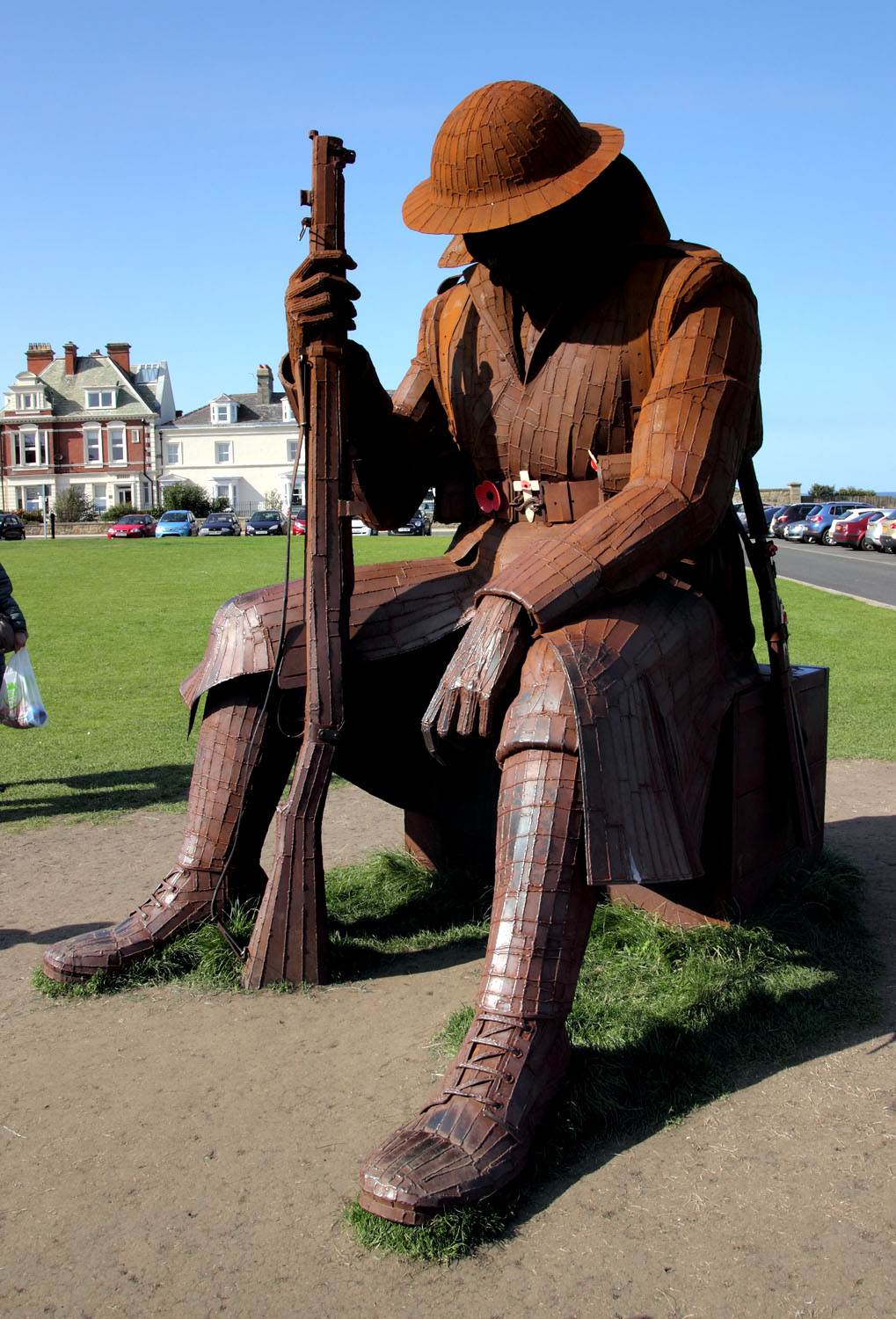
Tommy statue by local artist, Ray Lonsdale

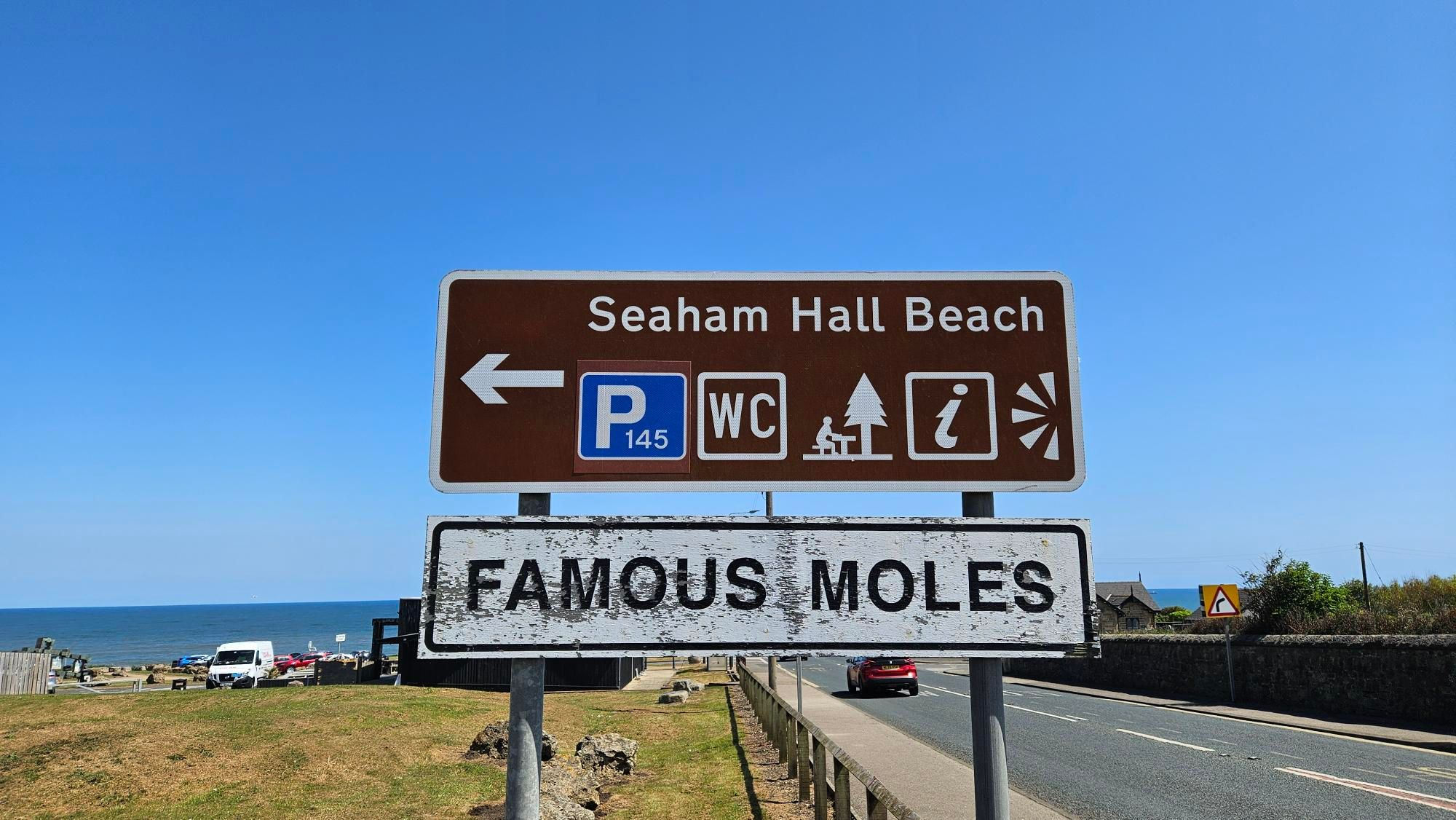
Famous Moles sign on B1287 near Seaham Hall

== Notable people ==
Between 1929 and 1935, the Member of Parliament (MP) for Seaham (the defunct constituency which covered the area now renamed Easington) was Labour Prime Minister Ramsay MacDonald. Easington constituency has only ever returned Labour candidates to Parliament, and at the 2010 General Election, Labour candidate Grahame Morris was elected with a majority of 14,982 votes.

Seaham has also produced several able footballers, some of whom have gone on to play for the local team, Sunderland, such as Richie Pitt and Gary Rowell. Terry Fenwick and Brian Marwood played for England, with the latter, on retirement from football, working as a commentator for Sky Sports. Paul Gascoigne also lived in Seaham in the late 1990s, while playing for Middlesbrough.

Other notable residents include:

- Baritone Sir Thomas Allen was born in Seaham in 1944
- Martin Brammer, musician
- Bob Fox, musician
- Elizabeth Sterling Haynes (born in Seaham in 1897), Canadian theatre activist
- Janie Jones, singer
- William McNally, Victoria Cross winner
- Ian Pattison, cricketer
- John Stapylton Grey Pemberton, MP for Sunderland, who lived at Hawthorn Tower, Seaham Harbour
- Agony aunt and author Denise Robertson lived in the town for many years
- Alex Russell, former professional footballer
- Peter Willey, Northamptonshire and England cricketer, went to Seaham Secondary School

== Freedom of the Town ==
The following people and military units have received the Freedom of the Town of Seaham.

=== Military Units ===
- The 4th Regiment Royal Artillery: 23 July 2022.

== See also ==
- Seaton Sluice
- South Shields
- Seaburn
- Seaton Carew
- Saltburn
