= Warke =

Warke is a surname. Notable people with the surname include:

- Larry Warke (1927–1989), Irish cricketer and medical doctor
- Robert Warke (1930–2021), Irish bishop
- Stephen Warke (born 1959), Irish cricketer
- Richard Warke, Canadian billionaire

== See also ==
- Ware (surname)
- Wark (surname)
