= Wark Castle =

Wark Castle may refer to:

- Wark on Tweed Castle, Northumberland
- Wark in Tyndale Castle, Northumberland

== See also ==
- Wark (disambiguation), a Scots noun for a building
