= Northallerton =

Town in North Yorkshire, England

Coordinates: 54°20′27″N 1°26′00″W

- Town
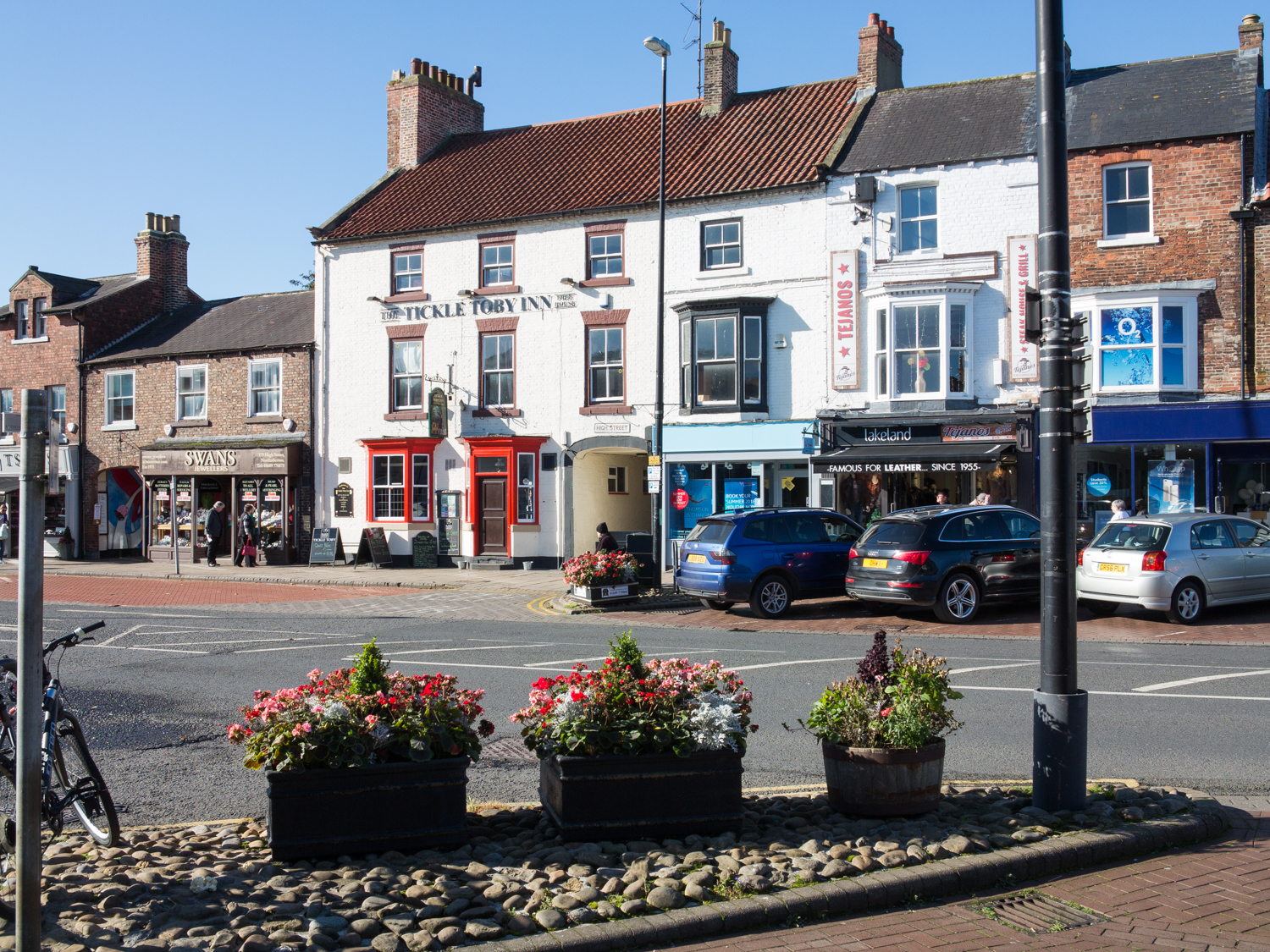
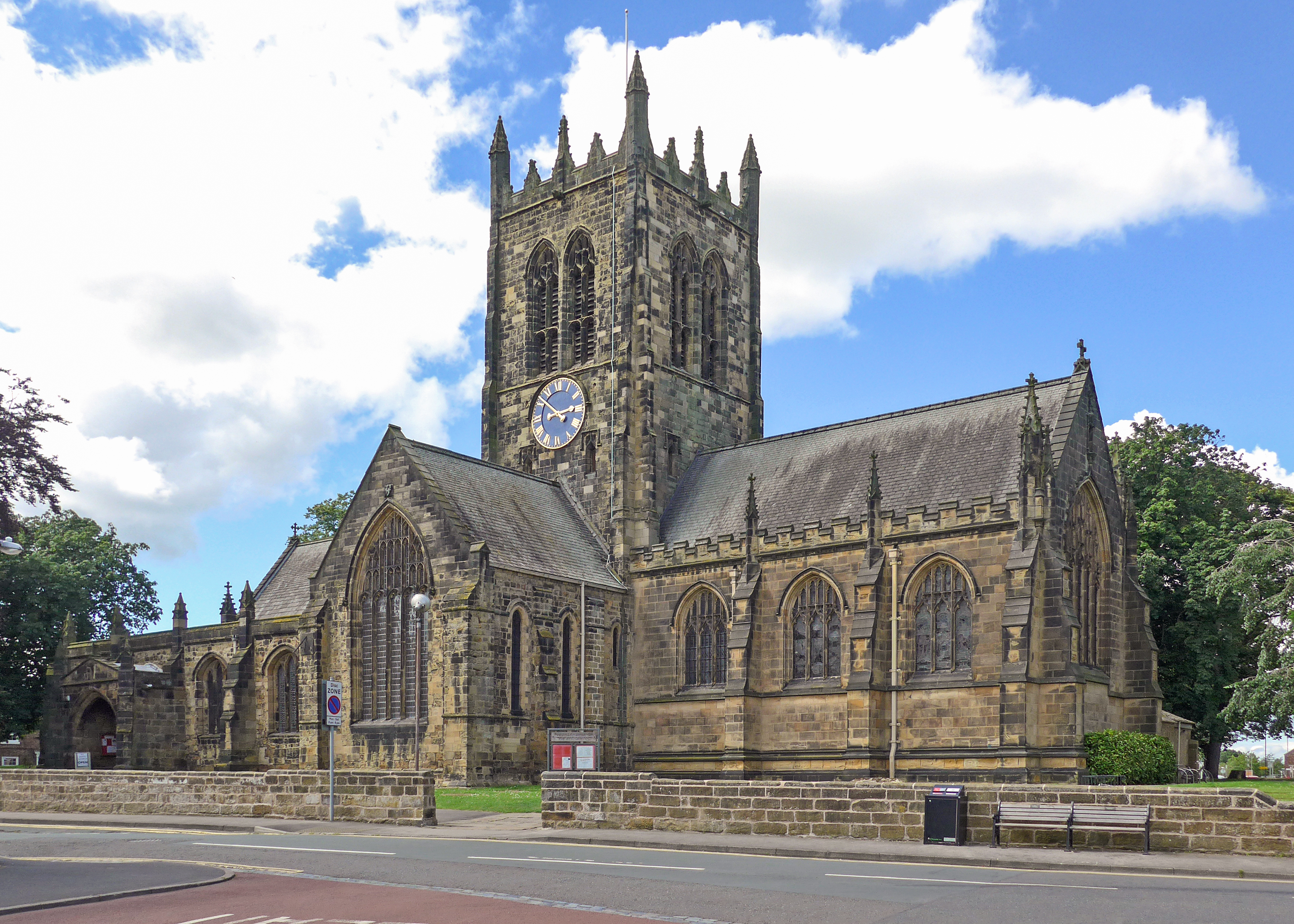
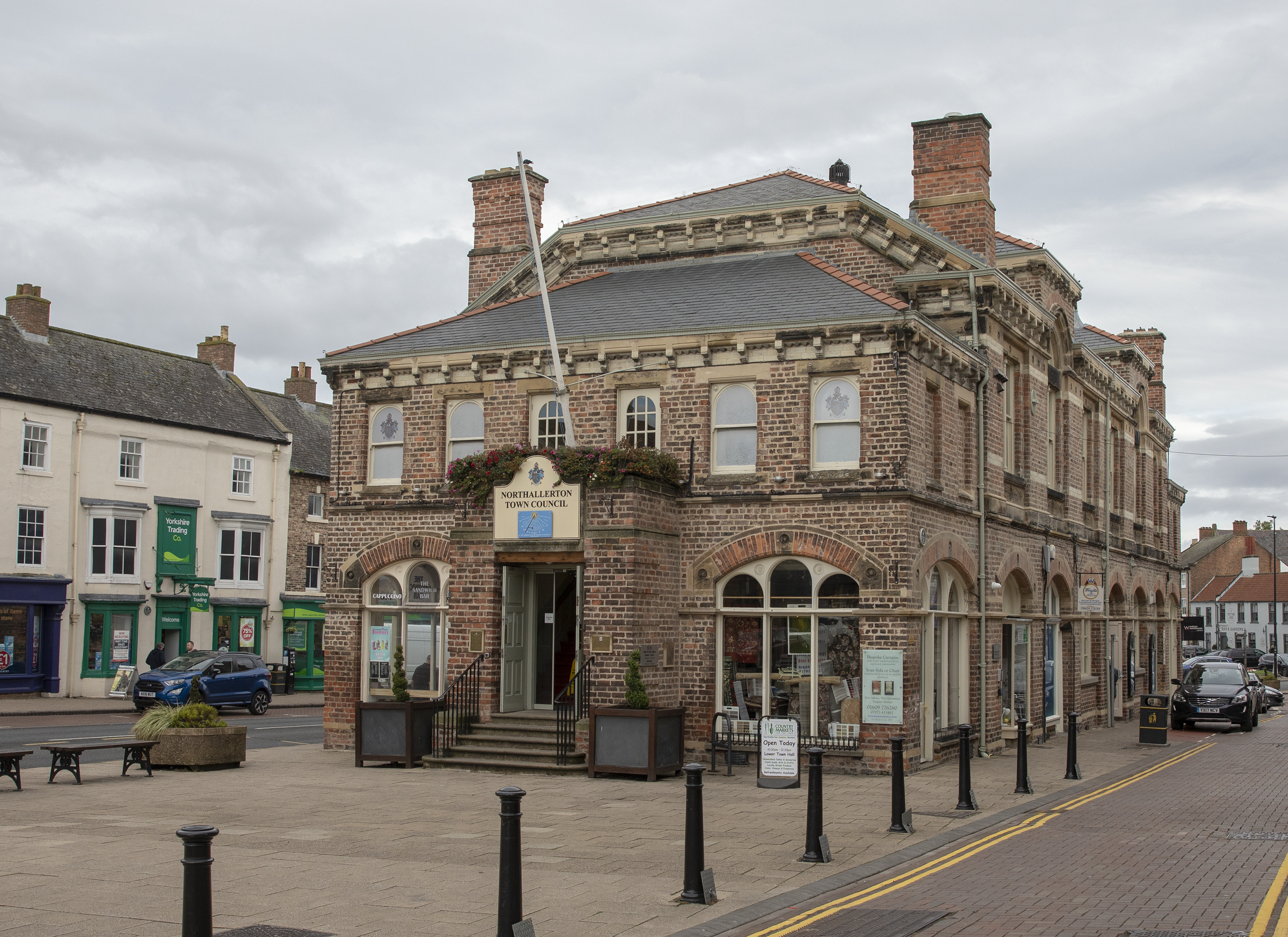
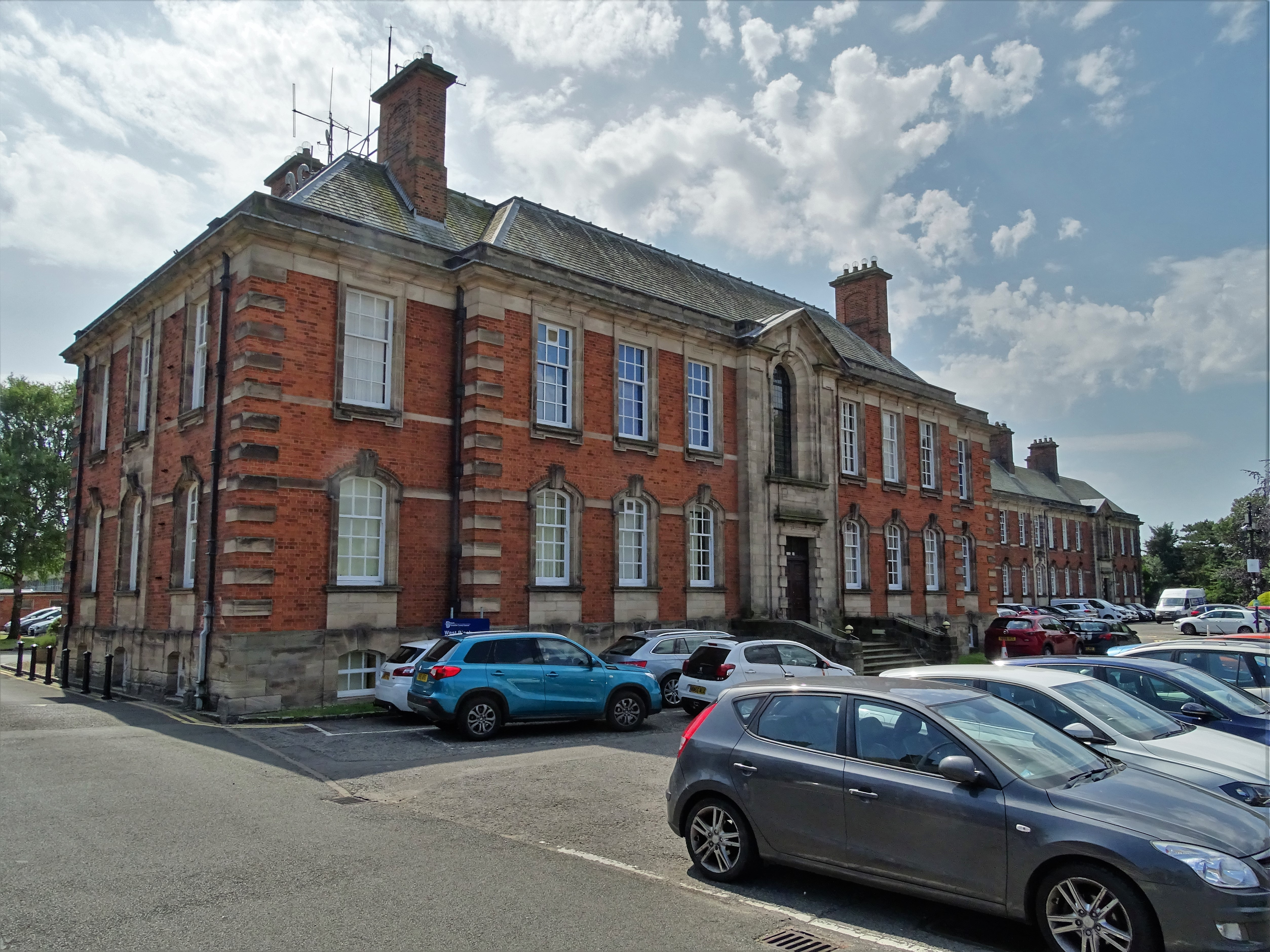
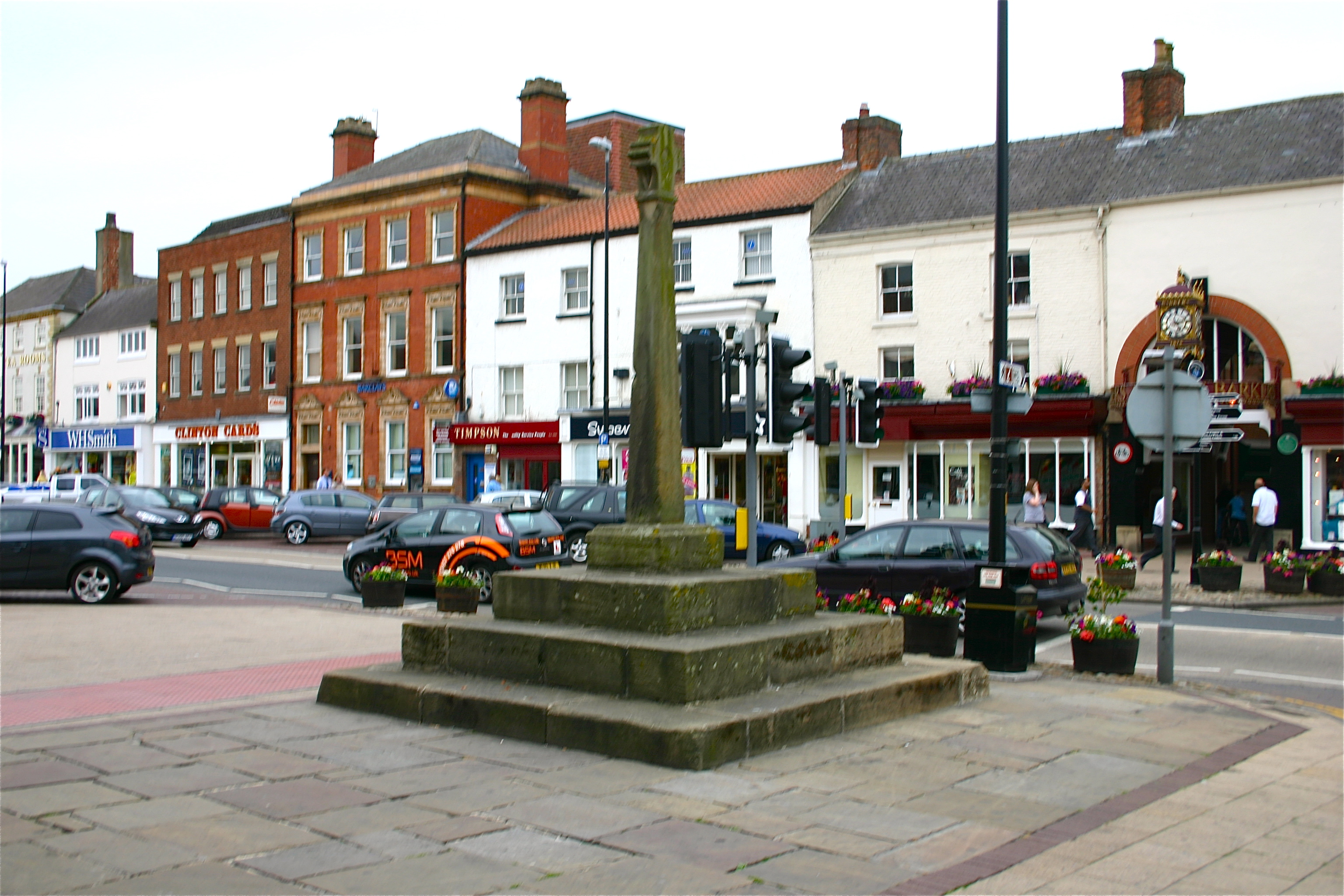
- High Street All Saints' Church Town Hall County Hall Market Cross

- Location within North Yorkshire
- Area: 33.41 km^{2} (12.90 sq mi)
- Population: 16,832 (2011 census)
  - Density: 503.8/km^{2} (1,305/sq mi)
- OS grid reference: SE371937
- Unitary authority: North Yorkshire
- Ceremonial county: North Yorkshire
- Region: Yorkshire and the Humber
- Country: England
- Sovereign state: United Kingdom
- Post town: NORTHALLERTON
- Postcode district: DL6, DL7
- Dialling code: 01609
- Police: North Yorkshire
- Fire: North Yorkshire
- Ambulance: Yorkshire
- UK Parliament: Richmond and Northallerton
- Website: www.northallertontowncouncil.org

Northallerton (/nɔːrˈθælərtən/ nor-THAL-ər-tən) is a market town and civil parish in North Yorkshire, England. It is near the River Wiske in the Vale of Mowbray and had a population of 16,832 in 2011. Northallerton is an administrative centre for York and North Yorkshire Combined Authority and North Yorkshire Council.

There has been a settlement at Northallerton since Roman times. That grew in importance from the 11th century when King William II gifted land there to the Bishop of Durham, and it became an important religious centre. The Battle of the Standard fought nearby in 1138 involved the death of up to 12,000 Scots.

Northallerton was an important stopping point for coaches on the road between Edinburgh and London until the arrival of the railway.

== History ==
=== Early ===
Due to its proximity to a Roman road, entrenchments and relics, the earliest settlement at Northallerton was a Roman military station. There is evidence that the Romans had a signal station on Castle Hills just to the west of the town as part of the imperial Roman postal system and a path connecting Hadrian's Wall with Eboracum (York) ran through what is now the neighbouring village of Brompton.

The first church was set up by St Paulinus of York on the site of the present All Saints Parish Church sometime in the early 7th century. It was made from wood and nothing survives of it. In 855 a stone church was built on the same site; fragments of stone have been found during restoration work which provide strong evidence of this Anglian church.

It was believed that an Anglo-Saxon town known as Alvertune then developed. In Pierre de Langtoft's history of King Alfred he writes that in 865 it was the site of a number of battles between King Elfrid and his brother Alfred on one side and five Danish kings and a similar number of earls. Later, in the 10th century, Danes settled at Romanby and Brompton. A fine example of English stonecarving from the period, the Brompton Hogbacks, can be found in Brompton Parish Church.

In the Domesday Survey, Norman scribes named the settlement Alvertune, Aluertune and Alretone and there is a reference to the Alvertune wapentac, an area almost identical to the Allertonshire wapentake of the North Riding, which was named after the town.

The origin of the town's name is uncertain, though it is believed that the name derives from a derivation of the name Aelfere, Aelfereton translates as the farm belonging to Aelfere or even of King Alfred. Alternatively it may be referring to the Alder trees which grew nearby. The prefix of North was added in the 12th century to differentiate from the parish of Allerton Mauleverer, 25 miles (40 kilometres) to the south.

Its position on a major route brought death and destruction to the town on many occasions. In 1069, in an attempt to quell rebellion in the north, the area between the Ouse and the Tyne was laid waste by the armies of William the Conqueror. The town of Northallerton was almost totally destroyed or depopulated. Just a few years later it is described in the Domesday Book as modo est in manu regis et wastum est ("it is now in the king's hand and is a waste").

=== Battle of the Standard ===
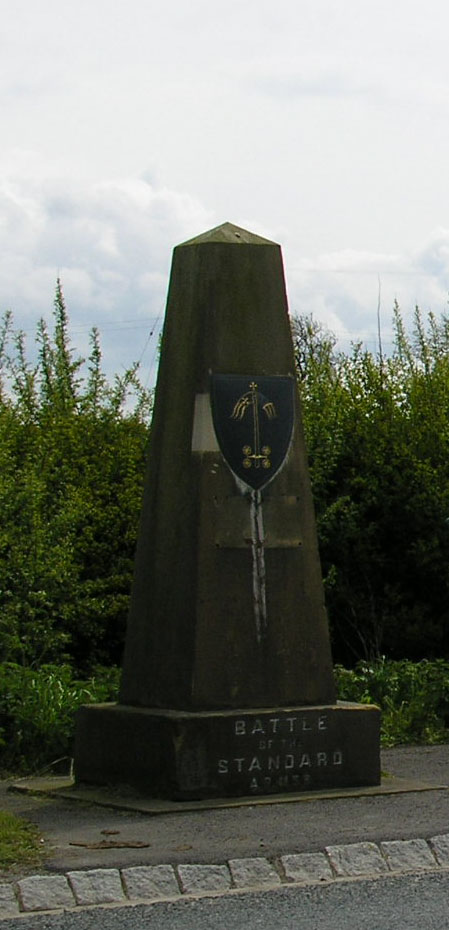
Monument commemorating the Battle of the Standard

On 22 August 1138, English forces repelled a Scottish army on Cowton Moor in Brompton parish, around 2 mi (3 km) north of the town. This was the first major battle between the Scots and the English after the Norman conquest and one of the two major battles in the civil war between King Stephen and Empress Matilda. The English forces were summoned by Archbishop Thurstan of York, who had gathered local militia and baronial armies from Yorkshire and the North Midlands. They arrayed themselves round a chariot with a ship's mast carrying the consecrated banners of St Peter of York, St John of Beverley, St Wilfrid of Ripon and St Cuthbert of Durham, it was this standard-bearing chariot that gave the battle its name.

King David had entered England in support of his niece, Empress Matilda, who was viewed as the rightful heiress to the English throne usurped by King Stephen. With Stephen fighting rebel barons in the south, the Scottish armies had already taken Cumberland and Northumberland, the city of Carlisle and the royal castle at Bamburgh. Finding the English in a defensive position on a hill, David elected to force a battle counting on his superior numbers, 16,000 Scots against 10,000 Englishmen. Repeated attacks by native Scots failed against the onslaught from the English archers, with losses of up to 12,000 Scots. A subsequent attack by mounted knights met initial success but fell back due to lack of infantry support. The battle ended when David's reserve deserted, forcing him to retreat. The English elected not to pursue, and despite their great losses the Scots were able to regroup in sufficient number to besiege and capture Wark Castle. The victory by the English ensured the safety of Northern England.

=== Religion ===
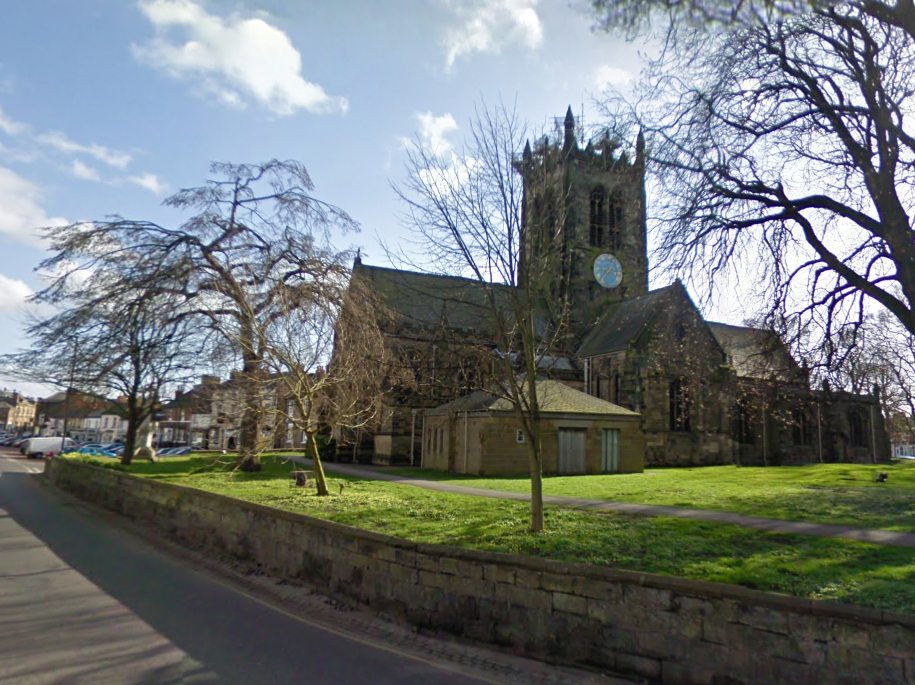
All Saints' Church, Northallerton

Shortly after his accession William Rufus gave the town, with the lands adjacent, to the see of Durham, and, under the patronage of the bishops of that diocese, it grew in importance, and became an episcopal residence. In 1130 a castle was built on the west side of the town adjacent to North Beck by Bishop Rufus and was expanded in 1142 after William Cumin had seized the Bishopric of Durham in 1141. The castle was further expanded in 1173 by Hugh Pudsey and garrisoned by Flemish soldiers, an act which enraged King Henry II who ordered it be razed to the ground in 1177. A more substantial fortified palace surrounded by a moat was built on the same site in 1199, replacing the motte-and-bailey castle. The palace became an important administrative centre for the bishops' lands in Yorkshire and served as a major residence for the bishops and their staff. The palace lay on the main road from York to Durham and was a regular stopping place for royalty and other dignitaries. The palace had fallen into ruin by 1658 and the site is now a cemetery.

In 1318, the town was destroyed by the Scots, under Sir James Douglas following the Capture of Berwick upon Tweed. A Carmelite priory was founded in 1354, but was demolished soon after the dissolution of the monasteries in 1538. The site passed to various people and was used for arable farming before a workhouse was built on the site in 1857. Subsequently, the Friarage Hospital, which takes its name from the friary, was built. Following development of the site in 2006, archaeologists uncovered the remains of eight monks along with other artefacts.

In 1978, Northallerton Sons of William Loyal Orange Lodge #265 was established as a part of the Orange Order. The Northallerton Lodge is under the Grand Orange Lodge of England. They are a Protestant fraternity that practices the Protestant faith, hold regular meetings and participate in Orange marches. The name "Sons of William" is a tribute to King William III, a key figure to the Orange Order.

=== Law and order ===
A house of correction opened in 1783 on Priest Garth (land owned by the Bishop of Durham), beside what is now East Road. This became HM Prison Northallerton, which served (at different times) as an adult prison, a Young Offender Institution, and a military prison. The prison closed in 2013 and is now partially demolished. It once had the world's largest treadmill. As of February 2021, the site of the former prison has two retail outlets, Iceland and Lidl situated on it.

The Quarter Sessions for the area were held in the town from the 17th century in various buildings including the Tollbooth, the Guild Hall and Vine House. In 1875, architect John Carr was commissioned to build a dedicated courthouse on Zetland Road, adjacent to the prison. When in 1856 the North Riding Constabulary was founded, one of the last county forces to be formed, Northallerton was selected as its headquarters. Initially it operated from a converted house beside the prison, moving to a purpose-built structure in 1880. Police HQ moved to nearby Racecourse Lane (the site of the former Northallerton horse-racing course) in 1910, with the court moving opposite it in 1936. The previous courthouse and police buildings were demolished in the 1990s. The court building on Racecourse Lane later housed the magistrates' court and coroner's court.

When the Poor Law union system was introduced, a workhouse was established in the town to serve the three parishes in the area. This building is now part of the Friarage Hospital.

The Thirsk Road drill hall was opened in 1911, just before the First World War.

== Governance ==
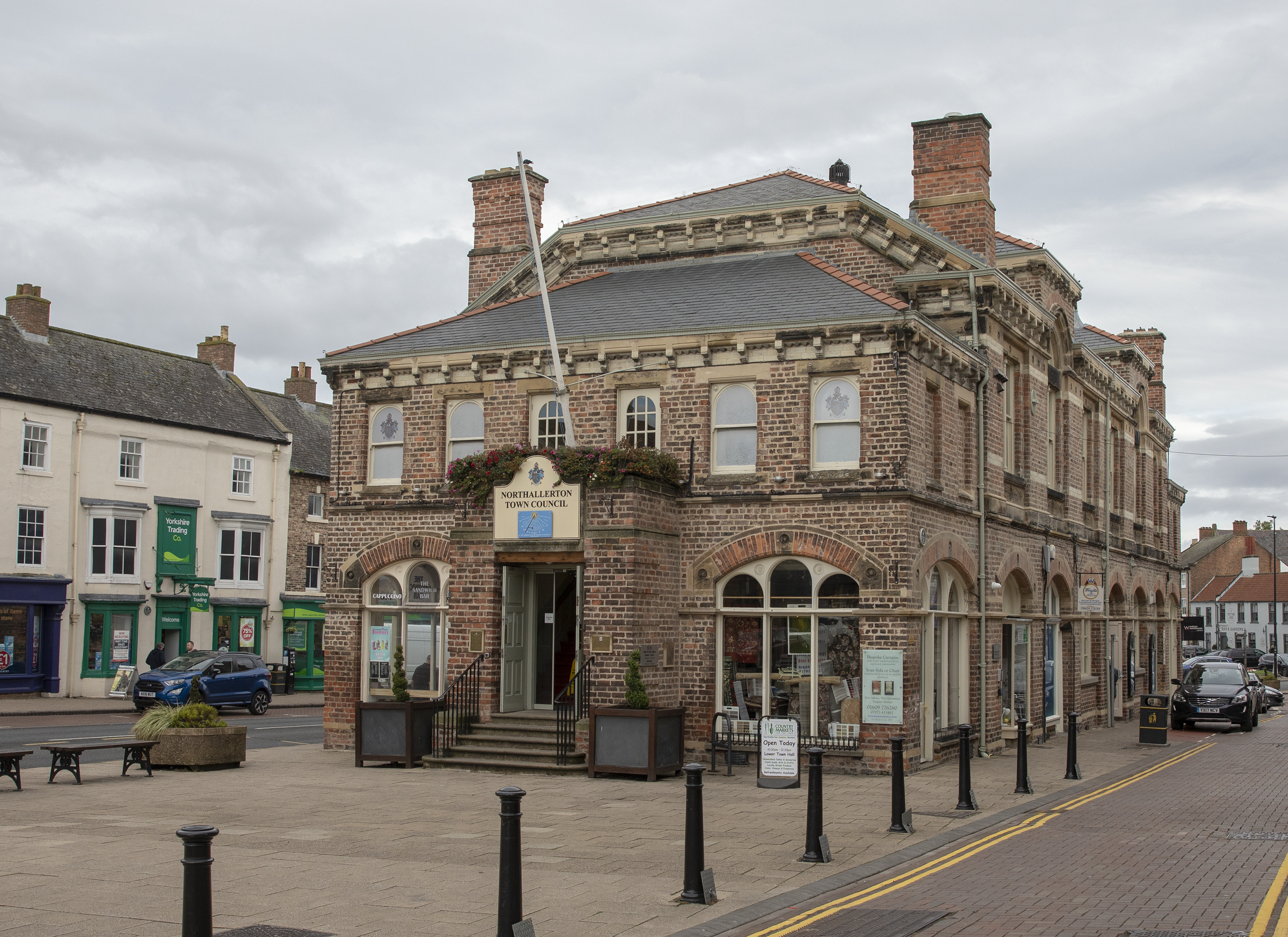
Northallerton Town Hall

The ancient parish of Northallerton covered a wide area including the townships and chapelries of Romanby, Brompton and Deighton, and the detached part of High Worsall on the River Tees. They became separate civil parishes in the 19th century.

The parish council of Northallerton is a town council and has 12 councillors, elected in four wards. The town council is based at Northallerton Town Hall.

Northallerton has been twinned with Ormesson-sur-Marne, a suburb of Paris, since 1994.

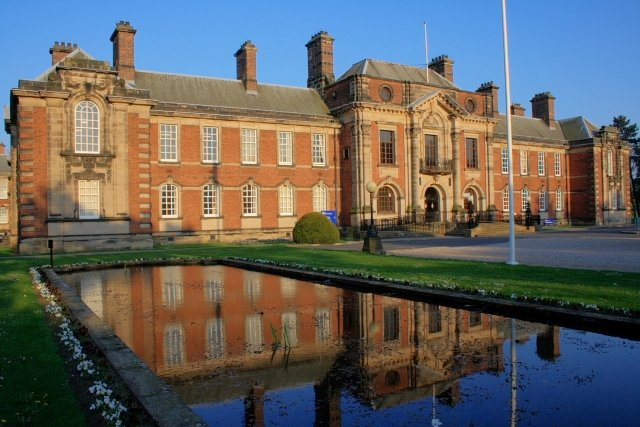
North Yorkshire County Hall

In 1889 the County of York, North Riding administrative county was formed. In 1894 it was divided into municipal boroughs, urban districts and rural districts. Following a review of local government in 1974, the North Riding was abolished as an administrative county. The district council of Hambleton was formed from the merger of Northallerton Urban District with Bedale Rural District, Easingwold Rural District, Northallerton Rural District, Thirsk Rural District and Croft Rural District. This became part of the non-metropolitan county of North Yorkshire.

Since 2023, North Yorkshire Council has provided both district-level and county-level services. York and North Yorkshire Combined Authority assumed its powers on 1 February 2024. The first Mayor of York and North Yorkshire will be elected in May 2024.

Northallerton was a parliamentary borough. Its first representatives were John le Clerk and Stephen Maunsell, who were elected to the parliament of King Edward I in 1298, but no subsequent return was made until 1640, when the privilege was resumed by order of the House of Commons. From 1640 to 1885, the town formed the parliamentary borough of Northallerton, returning two Members of Parliament (MPs) until the Great Reform Act of 1832. Under the Act, boundaries were extended to include Brompton and Romanby and representation was reduced to a single member.

In 1885 the constituency was abolished and absorbed into the Richmond division of the North Riding. The serving member for the Richmond constituency is Rishi Sunak of the Conservative Party, who has held the seat since 2015 when he succeeded former party leader and Foreign Secretary William Hague. In modern times it has been a safe seat for the Conservative Party, which has held it since 1929. Sunak served as Prime Minister between 2022 and 2024.

== Geography ==
=== Distance to other places ===
Place	Distance	Direction	
London	203 mi (327 km)	South	Capital
York	30 mi (48 km)	South east	Historic county town
Durham	30 mi (48 km)	North	Historic bishopric centre
Middlesbrough	18 mi (29 km)	North east	
Ripon	14 mi (23 km)	South west	Closest city

=== Topography ===
Northallerton lies north of the Vale of York in the Vale of Mowbray just south of County Durham. To the west are the Pennines, a range of hills that rise to around 2,000 feet (600 metres), and to the east are the North York Moors which rise to around 1,500 feet (450 metres). The proximity of these hills is significant in the climatology of the area. The River Wiske, a tributary of the River Swale passes to the west of the town. The Wiske is fed by Brompton Beck, Turker Beck, Willow Beck and North Beck all of which flow through the town. Although small in nature these have been the focus of flash flooding in Northallerton and in Brompton village in the 21st century.

=== Climate ===
According to the Köppen classification, the British Isles experience a maritime climate characterised by relatively cool summers and mild winters. Compared with other parts of the country, the Vale of York is slightly warmer and sunnier in the summer and colder and frostier in the winter. Owing to its inland position, and sheltered by the Pennines to the west, North Yorkshire is one of the driest counties in the UK, receiving, on average, around 600 mm (24 in) of rain per year. The mean annual daily duration of bright sunshine is three hours and 42 minutes.

There are two distinct local weather phenomena. The first is marked downslope lee wind caused by the proximity of the Pennines to the west, leading to super geostrophic winds which can reach in excess of 60 knots (110 km/h; 30 m/s), most commonly in winter and spring. In the winter, the presence of a subsidence inversion between the Pennines and the North York Moors can allow dense, persistent fog to form, sometimes lasting for several days.

The nearest official Met Office weather station to Northallerton is Leeming, about five miles (eight kilometres) to the west. Temperature extremes have ranged from 38.8 °C (101.8 °F) during July 2022, (making Leeming the northernmost place in the UK to exceed 38 °C (100 °F), down to −17.9 °C (−0.2 °F) during December 2010.

Leeming recorded its warmest December temperature on record in 2015.

Climate data for Leeming, elevation: 32 m (105 ft), 1991–2020 normals, extremes 1965–present
Month	Jan	Feb	Mar	Apr	May	Jun	Jul	Aug	Sep	Oct	Nov	Dec	Year
Record high °C (°F)	14.1 (57.4)	15.9 (60.6)	21.2 (70.2)	24.6 (76.3)	27.2 (81.0)	30.0 (86.0)	38.8 (101.8)	33.5 (92.3)	28.9 (84.0)	26.1 (79.0)	19.0 (66.2)	16.3 (61.3)	38.8 (101.8)
Mean daily maximum °C (°F)	7.0 (44.6)	7.9 (46.2)	10.2 (50.4)	13.0 (55.4)	16.0 (60.8)	18.7 (65.7)	21.0 (69.8)	20.5 (68.9)	17.9 (64.2)	13.8 (56.8)	9.9 (49.8)	7.2 (45.0)	13.6 (56.5)
Daily mean °C (°F)	4.0 (39.2)	4.5 (40.1)	6.2 (43.2)	8.4 (47.1)	11.3 (52.3)	14.1 (57.4)	16.3 (61.3)	16.0 (60.8)	13.6 (56.5)	10.2 (50.4)	6.6 (43.9)	4.1 (39.4)	9.6 (49.3)
Mean daily minimum °C (°F)	1.1 (34.0)	1.1 (34.0)	2.2 (36.0)	3.9 (39.0)	6.5 (43.7)	9.6 (49.3)	11.6 (52.9)	11.4 (52.5)	9.3 (48.7)	6.5 (43.7)	3.4 (38.1)	1.0 (33.8)	5.7 (42.3)
Record low °C (°F)	−17.3 (0.9)	−14.8 (5.4)	−9.0 (15.8)	−5.7 (21.7)	−3.8 (25.2)	1.4 (34.5)	3.5 (38.3)	2.7 (36.9)	0.4 (32.7)	−4.2 (24.4)	−10.4 (13.3)	−17.9 (−0.2)	−17.9 (−0.2)
Average precipitation mm (inches)	53.8 (2.12)	44.1 (1.74)	39.4 (1.55)	46.2 (1.82)	43.8 (1.72)	58.8 (2.31)	56.2 (2.21)	65.3 (2.57)	56.9 (2.24)	65.0 (2.56)	64.8 (2.55)	59.5 (2.34)	653.7 (25.74)
Average precipitation days (≥ 1.0 mm)	12.0	10.1	8.5	9.1	8.7	9.4	9.3	10.1	9.1	11.1	12.2	11.9	121.4
Mean monthly sunshine hours	58.2	81.7	121.5	153.8	195.0	175.9	185.5	171.2	132.7	93.4	63.7	54.2	1,486.7
Source 1: Met Office
Source 2: ECA&D

== Demography ==
According to the United Kingdom Census 2001, the town of Northallerton had a total resident population of 15,741 or 18.5% of the total of Hambleton District. This figure, combined with an area of 23.1 square kilometres (8.9 sq mi), provides Northallerton with a population density figure of 674 inhabitants per square kilometre (1,750/sq mi). This is higher than the average population density of England (at 380/km^{2} or 984/sq mi). There are 8,203 females and 7,538 males, which works out at 91.9 males for every 100 females. The place of birth of the town's residents was 98.5% United Kingdom, 0.35% Ireland, 0.37% from other European Union countries, and 0.75% from elsewhere in the world. Compared with the average demographics of England, Northallerton has low proportions of people born outside the United Kingdom and ethnic minorities, and above average numbers of people over 65 years of age.

Northallerton compared (2001 Census)
	Northallerton	Hambleton District	Yorkshire and the Humber	England
Total population	15,741	84,111	4,964,833	49,138,831
By ethnic grouping
White	99%	99.2%	93.5%	91%
Asian	0.3%	0.1%	4.5%	4.6%
Black	~0%	0.1%	0.7%	2.3%
Chinese	0.2%	0.2%	0.4%	0.9%
By religious grouping
Buddhist	0.1%	0.1%	0.1%	0.3%
Christian	81.8%	79.6%	73.1%	71.7%
Muslim	0.2%	0.1%	0.4%	3.1%
Hindu	0.2%	0.1%	0.3%	1.1%
Jewish	~0%	~0%	0.2%	0.5%
Sikh	0%	~0%	0.4%	0.7%
Other religions	0.1%	0.1%	0.2%	0.3%
No religion/no religion stated	17.7%	16.5%	21.9%	22.3%
Other categories
Foreign born	1.5%	2.28%	5.25%	9.2%
Over 65 years old	18.3%	17.5%	16.1%	16%
Unemployed	2.2%	2.0%	3.7%	3.3%

This table summarises the population changes in the town since 1801: the population grew in the early 19th century and again in the 20th century. In particular, between 1961 and 1991 the population more than doubled. The fall in population between 1851 and 1871 has been attributed to the collapse in coaching as the railways became popular.

Year	1801	1811	1821	1831	1841	1851	1861	1871	1881	1891	1901	1911	1921	1931	1951	1961	1971	1981	1991	2001	2011
Population	3,382	3,497	4,143	4,839	4,967	4,983	4,871	3,164	3,692	3,802	4,009	4,806	4,794	4,786	6,087	6,726	8,742	13,858	15,050	15,741	16,832

== Economy ==
The economic activity of residents aged 16–74 was 44.3% in full-time employment, 15% in part-time employment, 6.8% self-employed, 2.5% unemployed, 2.6% students with jobs, 4.7% students without jobs, 15.8% retired, 6.5% looking after home or family, 5.3% permanently sick or disabled, and 3.1% economically inactive for other reasons.

The average price of a house in Northallerton for the 12-month period ending July 2008 was £209,082 compared to £200,433 for North Yorkshire and the national average of £178,364.

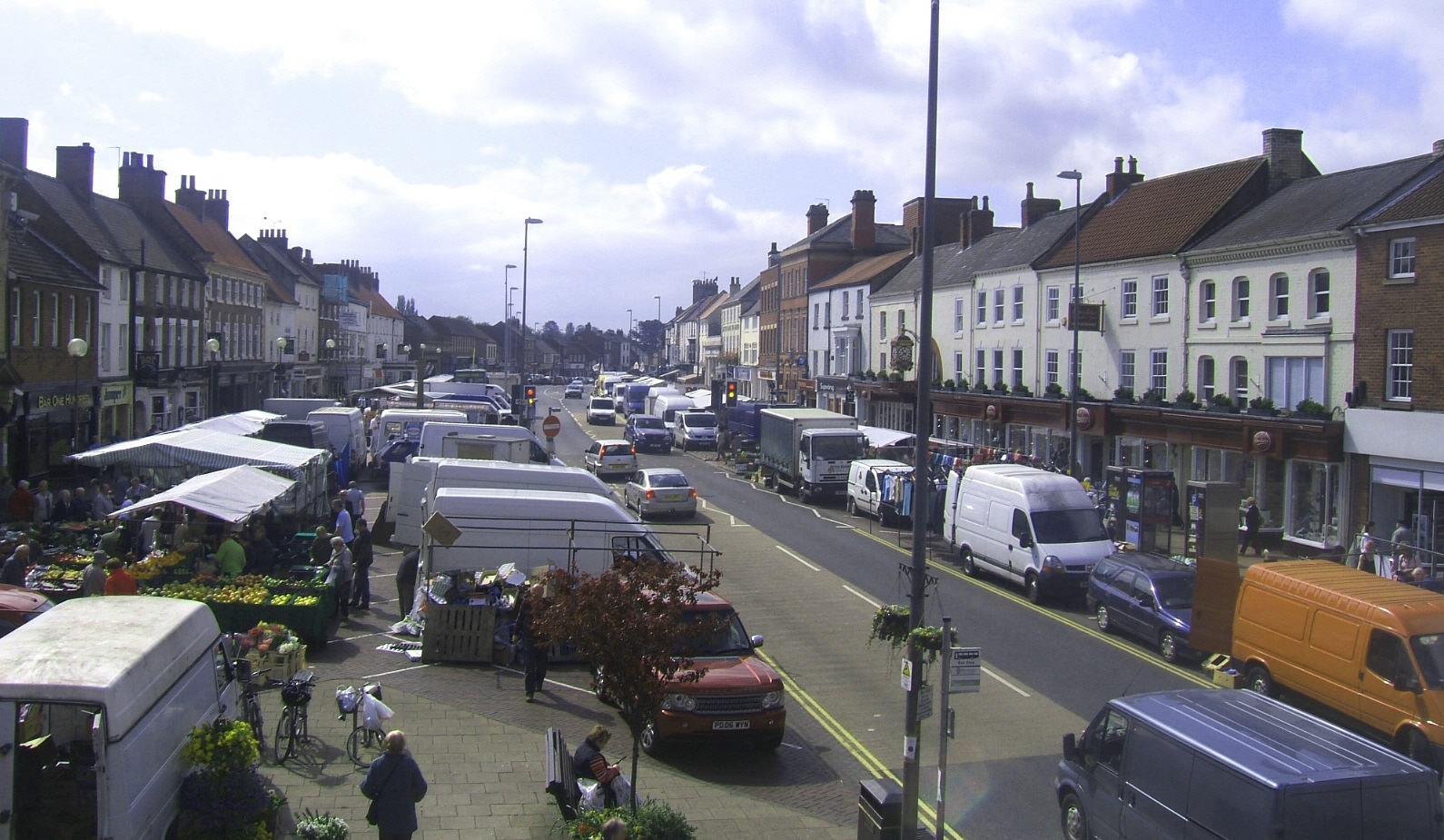
Northallerton High Street on market day

The town is a market centre for the area and also draws traders from further afield to its two annual fairs (formerly four). Cattle drovers bringing cattle, horses and sheep from Northumbria and Scotland regularly came to the town. The original cattle market was by the church, but sheep were sold on High Street until the early part of the 20th century. With the arrival of the railway, a mart was built close to the station, but this closed in 1981 and all business was concentrated on the cattle market held in Applegarth Court.

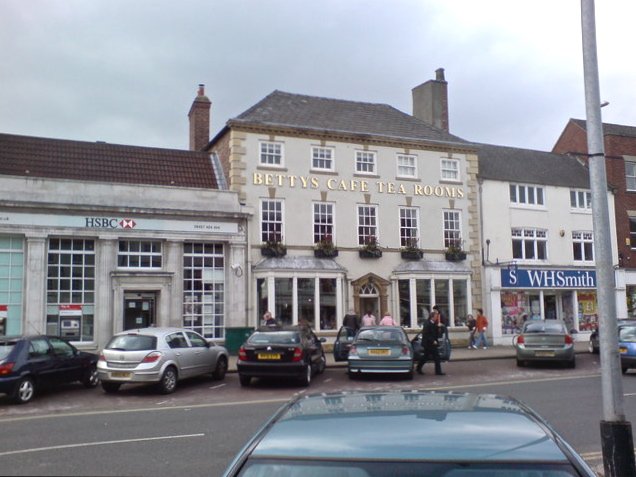
Bettys

Northallerton's wide High Street incorporates shops, restaurants, pubs and cafes, including local, independent retailers Bettys, Lewis & Cooper, Barkers and Boyes.

== Transport ==
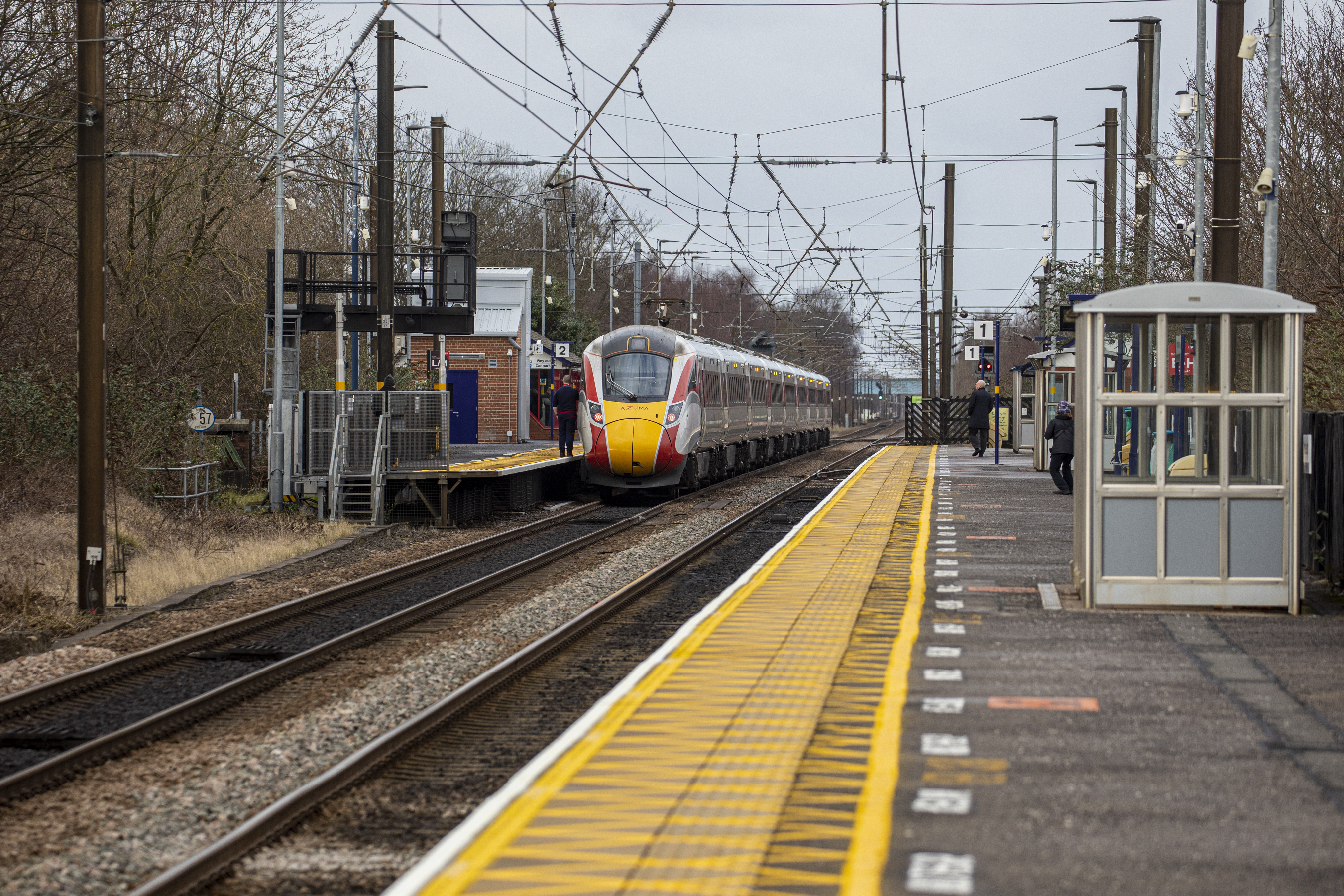
Northallerton railway station

Northallerton was built on the Roman Dere Street. It was a major stopping point on coach routes between Scotland and London with four coaching inns along the High Street. Coaching operations declined in the mid-19th century after the railway arrived in 1841.

Two main A roads pass through the town: the A684 runs approximately east–west through the town and links the A1(M) motorway at Leeming Bar and the A19 at Osmotherley; the A167 runs approximately north–south between the A1(M) at Darlington and the A168 at Topcliffe. The A168 runs from Wetherby via Thirsk to Northallerton.

Northallerton railway station is operated by TransPennine Express and lies on the East Coast Main Line.

Nearby Leeming Bar is on the heritage Wensleydale Railway to Redmire and can be reached by a Dales & District bus service between the stations.

Northallerton's nearest airport is Teesside International Airport, approximately 15 mi (24 km) north of the town, just to the east of Darlington.

== Sport ==
=== Football ===
Founded in 1895, Northallerton Town FC plays in the Northern League where it is the southernmost club. They play their home games out of Calvert Stadium. In 1994, the club was declared insolvent but was rescued by local businessmen in time for the next season. Brothers Michael Dawson, Andy Dawson and Kevin Dawson started their football careers at Northallerton Town.

=== Rugby ===
Northallerton Rugby Union Football Club play in the second division of the Yorkshire League at Brompton Lodge on the outskirts of Brompton. The club has existed since 1882.

=== Cricket ===
Cricket in Northallerton dates from 1812, although the first recorded match played by Northallerton Cricket Club was in the early 1860s. The club was one of the six founder member teams of the North Yorkshire Cricket League which was formed in 1893. The club join the Thirsk & District Senior League in 1911, winning its first title in 1914. Subsequently, known as the York Senior League, Northallerton won the championship a further eight times.

In 1949, the club moved from its ground adjacent to County Hall to the end of Farndale Avenue in Romanby. In 1965 a two tier pavilion, built at a cost of £6,500, was opened with match against a Yorkshire XI which included Geoffrey Boycott. The club fields three teams. The first team plays in division 2 of the North Yorkshire & South Durham Cricket League whilst the second team plays in division 4. The third team currently plays in the Darlington and District Cricket League.

=== Other sports ===
The pool at Northallerton Leisure Centre is owned by North Yorkshire Council. It is home to Northallerton Amateur Swimming Club. Formed in 1961, the club competes in the Moors League against others in the region. The Northallerton Hockey Club competes in regional leagues in Yorkshire. The Thirsk & Northallerton Golf Club is based in near Northallerton. Northallerton has a connection with the Scottish sport of shinty, Northallerton Camanachd competed competitively in the since the 1960s. A new club, called the Northallerton Shinty Club, was formed in 2012. One of the founders of the English Shinty Association is from Northallerton. The Northallerton Table Tennis League was established in 1952 and still continues with 1 Division and a practice evening at Northallerton Forum.

== Media ==
Bilsdale transmitting station is 8 mi (13 km) east of Northallerton.

Local radio stations are BBC Radio York on 104.3 FM and Minster Northallerton launched on 11 June 2007 from 103.5 MHz and 102.3 MHz, before becoming part of Star Radio North East. The frequencies now carry Greatest Hits Radio York and North Yorkshire.

The town is served by two local newspapers: the North Yorkshire editions of the daily Northern Echo and the weekly Darlington & Stockton Times, both published by Newsquest. The Northallerton, Thirsk & Bedale Times published by Johnston Press was discontinued in 2009.

== Entertainment ==
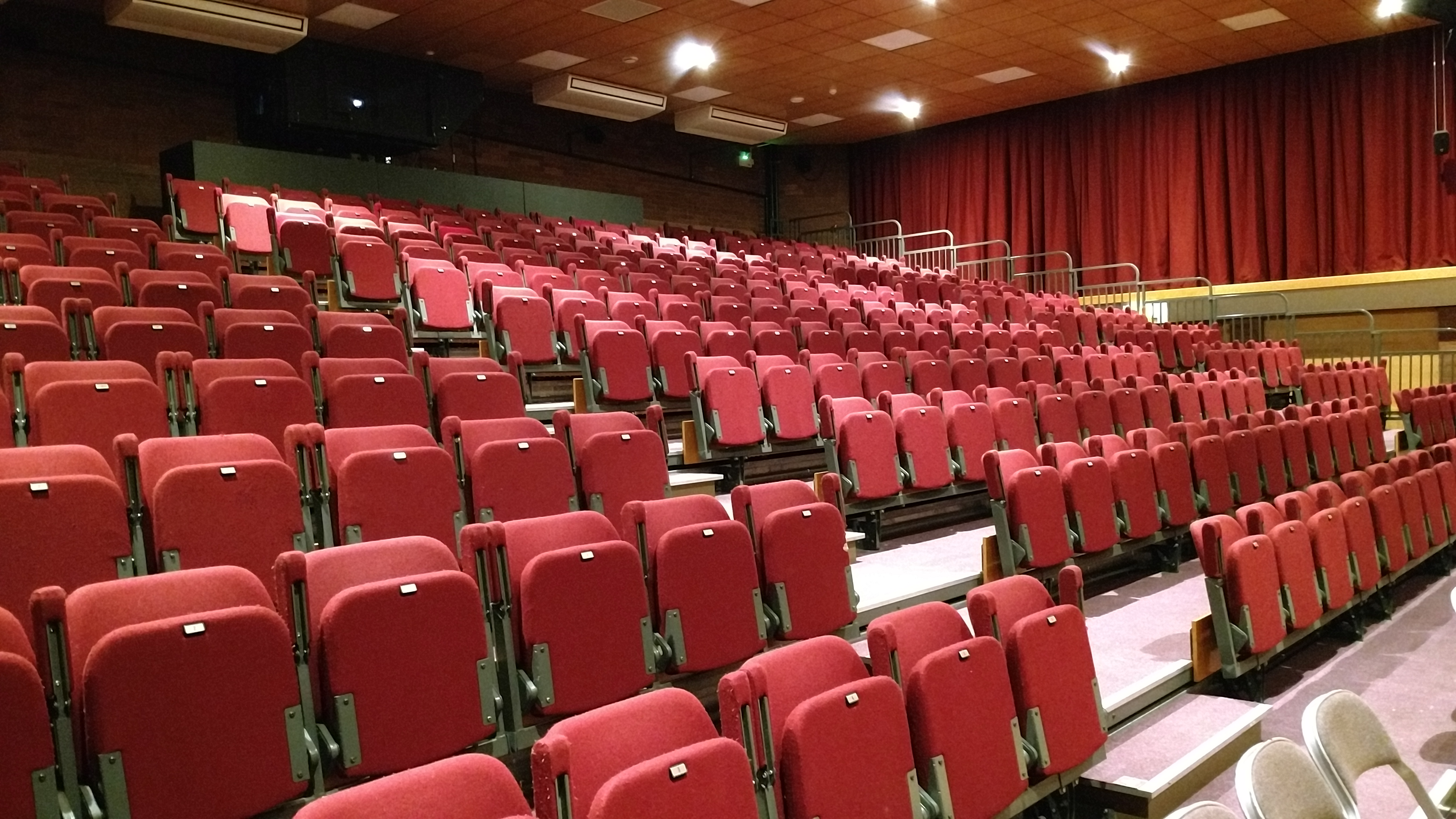
Inside The Forum

The Lyric cinema on the High Street opened in October 1939. It had a capacity of 1,000 seats and was also used as a theatre. It fell into disrepair and closed in June 1995. The building was bought by the New Life Baptist Church and converted to a place of worship.

The Forum arts and community centre stages theatre productions, films, concerts, and live broadcasts from other theatres. As Hambleton Forum, it was owned by Hambleton District Council. The council transferred ownership to a charitable trust in 2012, and it was renamed Northallerton Forum.

An Everyman Cinema opened in May 2023 in the Treadmills development on the former prison site.

== Education ==
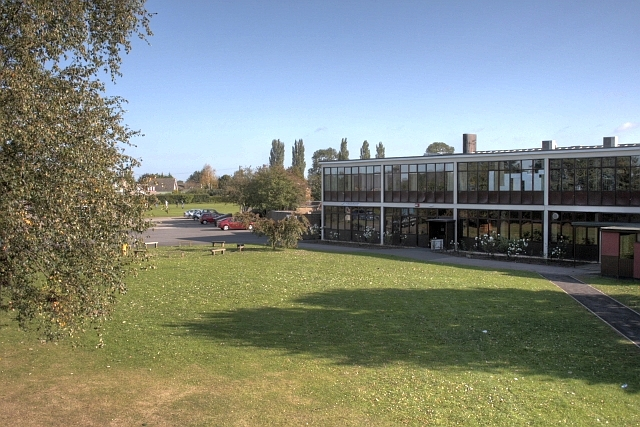
Northallerton School

There are six primary schools in Northallerton (Alverton, Applegarth, Broomfield, Mill Hill, Oakbridge, and Sacred Heart), with Oakbridge being a new school opened in 2024 coupled with a new housing development in north Northallerton. There is also a secondary school and a Technology College. After completing primary education children move on to the Northallerton School, a secondary school and sixth form. In addition further adult learning courses are run at the college through the learndirect and Nextstep schemes.

== Public services ==
The Yorkshire Ambulance Service NHS Trust is responsible for provision of statutory emergency medical services in the town.

The shared headquarters of North Yorkshire Police and North Yorkshire Fire and Rescue Service is in a former Rural Payments Agency building on Alverton Court. The fire station is "day crewed", operating from 08:00 to 18:00 each day and on-call outside these hours.

Mains water and sewage services are provided by Yorkshire Water. Drinking water is supplied from Bullamoor Reservoir, a system of four covered concrete cisterns on the hillside east of the town, which are fed with water from the River Ure via Thornton Steward Reservoir. Until around 2006, Northallerton received its water from Cod Beck Reservoir near Osmotherley. The storage at Bullamoor was doubled in 2006 in anticipation of the closure of Cod Beck Water Treatment Works; Sewage is processed at Northallerton and Romanby Sewage Treatment Works, both in Romanby, which discharge into Willow Beck, a tributary of the River Wiske.

== Popular culture ==
The Golden Lion Hotel on Northallerton's High Street depicts a public house in the 1945 film The Way to the Stars.

Playwright Alan Bennett's diaries described the town as 'a place to be avoided'.

== Arms ==
Coat of arms of Northallerton

Notes
Originally granted to the former Urban District council on 30 July 1957.
Crest
A cushion Gules tassled Or charged with three roses Argent thereon a Durham mitre Proper.
Torse
A wreath of the colours.
Escutcheon
Per pale Or and Azure a standard of three points mounted on a car the pole ensigned with a cross formy all between two lions rampant anciently crowned the dexter Lion contournée the whole counterchanged.
Motto
For God And Crown

== See also ==
- Listed buildings in Northallerton
- Railways in Northallerton
