= Lewis & Cooper =

Delicatessen in Northallerton, North Yorkshire

Lewis & Cooper Ltd
- Type: Private limited company
- Founded: 1899
- Founder: George Lewis; Binks Cooper
- Headquarters: Northallerton, England
- Area served: United Kingdom
- Key people: David Geary (chairman) Jonathan Hindley (Director) David Pears (Retail Director)
- Number of employees: 85
- Website: www.lewisandcooper.co.uk

Lewis & Cooper Ltd is an upmarket delicatessen based in the market town of Northallerton, in North Yorkshire. It was established in 1899 by George Lewis and Binks Barton Cooper, and is still owned and operated by Lewis' direct descendants.

Since the 1980s, Lewis & Cooper has developed a reputation as the "Fortnum & Mason of the North". They are known nationwide for their Christmas puddings and hampers, which are sold online, in upmarket retailers including Selfridge's and Harvey Nichols, as well as in store.

== History ==
The Northallerton store building dates back to the seventeenth century. In 1899, both George Henry Lewis and Binks Barton Cooper worked as managers at a high street grocery business in Northallerton. After the owner decided to sell the failing business, Lewis and Cooper executed a management buyout. The company was incorporated in January 1903. Cooper, a sleeping partner, sold his share of the business in 1914, but the Lewis & Cooper name remained. The company has sold hampers since 1936.

The customer base began to dwindle by the end of the 1970s, due to the rise of the supermarkets. In response, Lewis & Cooper began to reposition itself from a traditional grocers into a specialist upmarket food retailer.

In 1999, tea rooms were opened on the first floor of the Northallerton store, in what was formerly the manager's quarters. That same year, the store was featured on the newly released Yorkshire Monopoly board game. A smaller store opened in Yarm in 2001, which closed in June 2020. A Harrogate store opened in December 2011, but closed down in January 2013, following disappointing sales figures.

== Operations ==
Lewis & Cooper carries specialist items not often stocked by the major supermarkets, such as Chatka crab, Russian caviar and quail eggs. The Northallerton store has 32,000 different product lines, versus the supermarket average of 5,000, located across 6,000 square feet. 25 per cent of the Northallerton store's stock is sourced from the Yorkshire area. Rhiannon Batten of The Independent described the store as "one of the UK's most famous food emporiums."
