= Northallerton Town Hall =

Municipal building in Northallerton, North Yorkshire, England

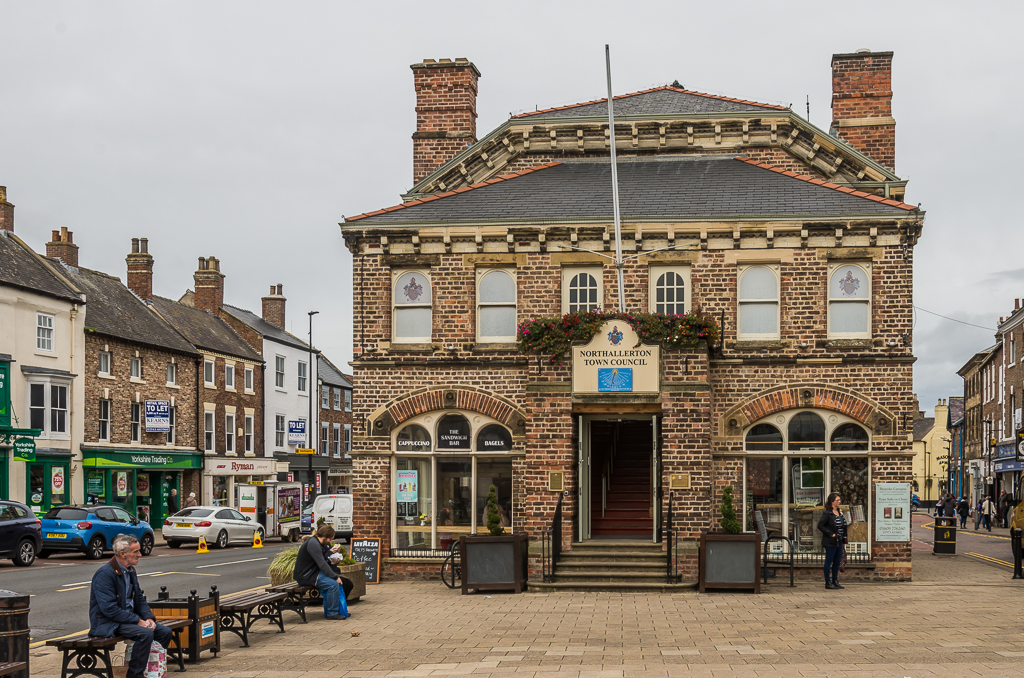
- Northallerton Town Hall

- Shown in North Yorkshire
- 54.3403°N 1.4344°W
- Location: High Street, Northallerton

History
- Built: 1873

Site notes
- Architect(s): John Ross and Robert Lamb
- Architectural style: Italianate style

Listed Building – Grade II
- Official name: Town Hall and Nos 1 to 7 The Town Hall
- Designated: 24 July 2001
- Reference no.: 1389344

Northallerton Town Hall is a municipal building in the High Street, Northallerton, North Yorkshire, England. The structure, which is the meeting place of Northallerton Town Council, is a grade II listed building.

== History ==
In the mid-19th century, a group of local businessmen decided to form a company to raise funds for the erection of an events venue in the town: the site they selected was occupied by a tollbooth, which had been in use for the collection of market rents since 1334, and a shambles, which had been the local place for meat trading since the 16th century. The "Northallerton Market and Public Improvements Company" was formed, the site was acquired from the Bishop of Durham, the old buildings were demolished and construction started in 1872. The new building was designed by John Ross and Robert Lamb of Darlington in the Italianate style, built in buff bricks with stone dressings at a cost of £3,000 and was officially opened on 22 December 1873.

The design involved a symmetrical main frontage with three bays facing south along the High Street. The central bay featured a short flight of steps leading up to a projecting porch which supported a balcony, with two French doors on the first floor. The outer bays contained segmental three-light windows on the ground floor and pairs of sash windows on the first floor. At roof level there was a modillioned cornice. Internally, the principal rooms were the market hall on the ground floor and the main assembly hall on the first floor. The architectural historian Nikolaus Pevsner was critical of the design, describing it as "really irredeemable".

The suffragettes, Lydia Becker and Helen Beedy, gave speeches advocating voting rights for women at a public meeting in the building in October 1875. Northallerton Urban District Council, which was formed in 1894, acquired the town hall and the market rights in 1923. However the council chose to establish its own offices at No. 72 High Street, leaving the town hall to continue operations as an events venue.

Following local government re-organisation in 1974, the building became the offices and meeting place of Northallerton Town Council. The future Chancellor of the Exchequer, Rishi Sunak, spoke at a meeting in the town hall, arranged to make the case for Brexit, in May 2016. A major programme of works to refurbish the basement for use as the new home of the Northallerton Amateur Boxing Club was completed in December 2021.

== See also ==
- Listed buildings in Northallerton
