= Thirsk Road drill hall, Northallerton =

Building in North Yorkshire, England

Thirsk Road drill hall
- Northallerton
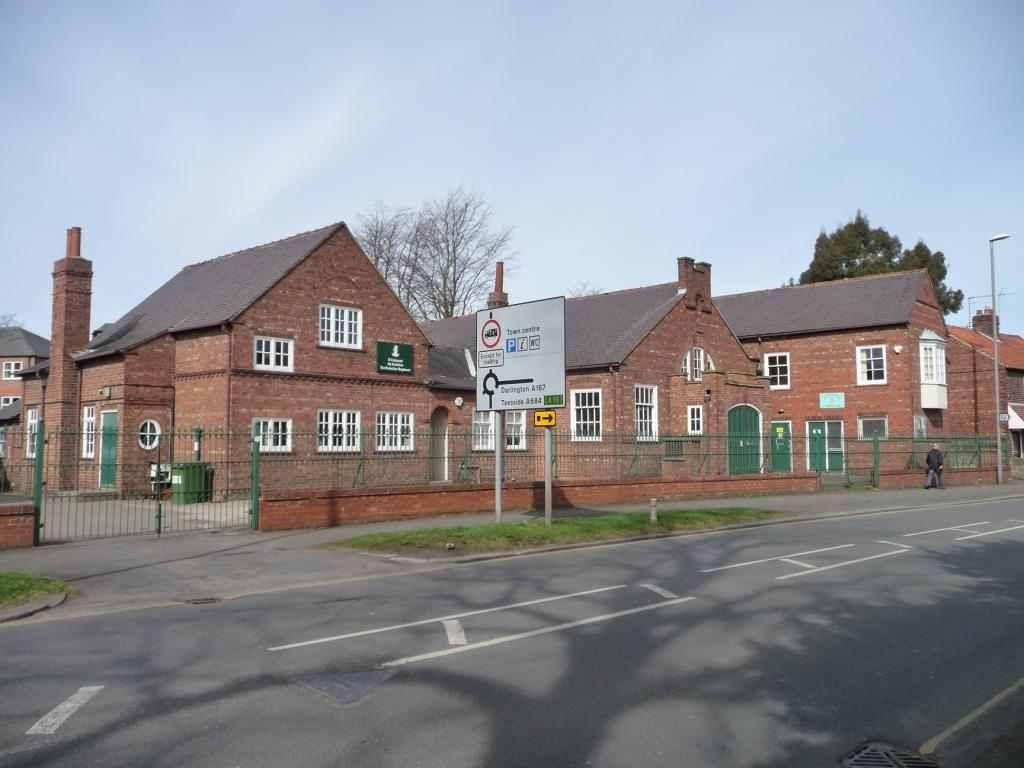
- Thirsk Road drill hall

Site information
- Type: Drill hall

Location
- Location within North Yorkshire
- Coordinates: 54.33587°N 1.43424°W

Site history
- Built: 1911
- Built for: War Office
- In use: 1911–present

The Thirsk Road drill hall is a former Army Reserve installation in Northallerton, North Yorkshire, England.

== History ==
The building was designed as the headquarters of the 4th Battalion the Green Howards and was completed in 1911. The battalion was mobilised at the drill hall in August 1914 before being deployed to the Western Front. In 1938 the battalion headquarters moved to Lytton Street in Middlesbrough, but shortly after the end of the Second World War, elements of B Company, 4th Battalion The Green Howards returned to the Thirsk Road drill hall.

After the 4th battalion amalgamated with the 5th Battalion to form the 4th/5th Battalion, The Green Howards in 1961, the presence at the drill hall was disbanded. However, in 1993 a platoon sized detachment from C Company of that regiment was reformed at the drill hall. Following the amalgamations that led to the formation of the Yorkshire Regiment in 2006, it was a detachment from B Company of the 4th Battalion of the new regiment that maintained the presence.

Although it is no longer an Army Reserve Centre, the drill hall continues to be used by 2337 (Northallerton) Squadron of the Air Training Corps and by the Army Cadet Force.
