= Barkers of Northallerton =

Department store in North Yorkshire, England

Barkers (Northallerton) Limited
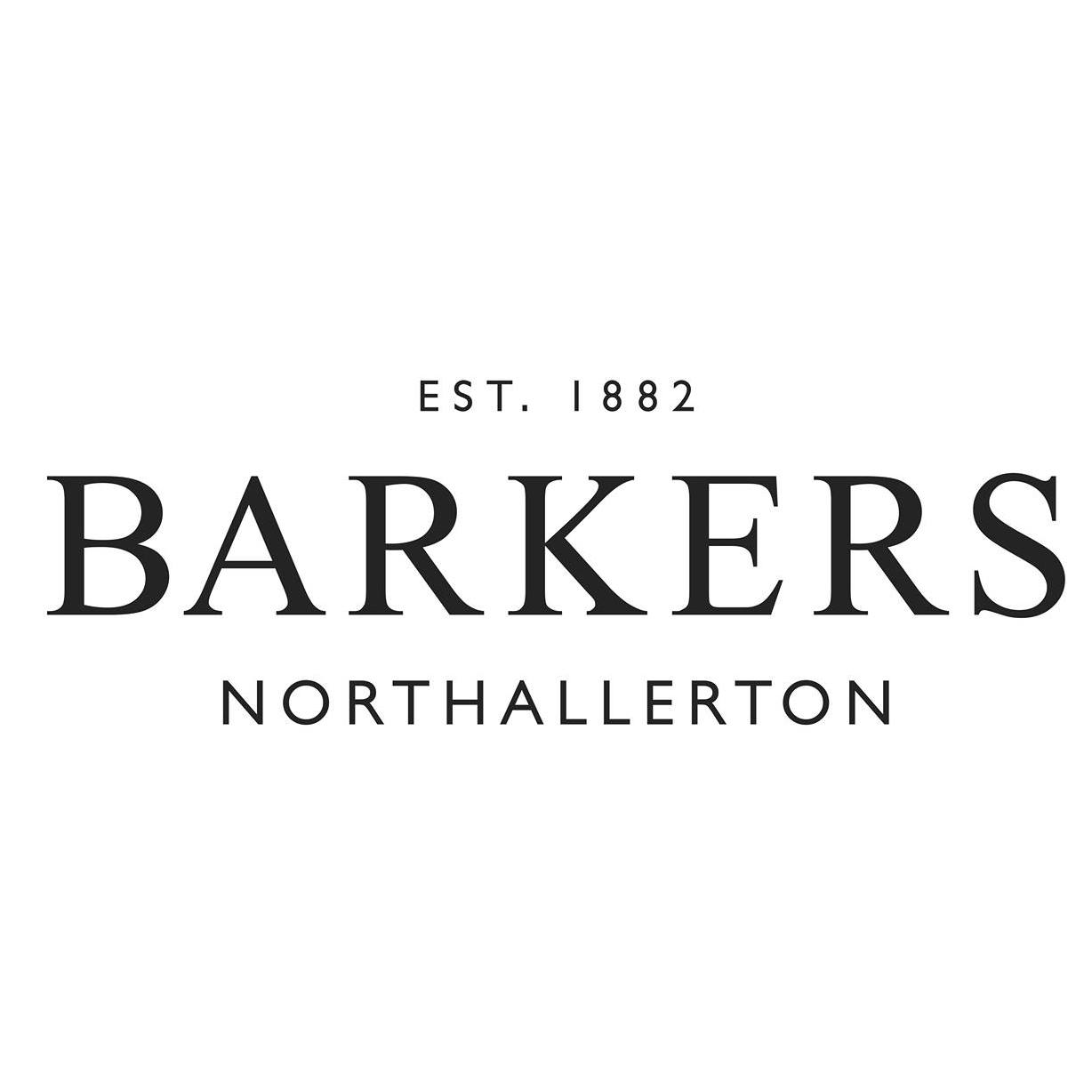

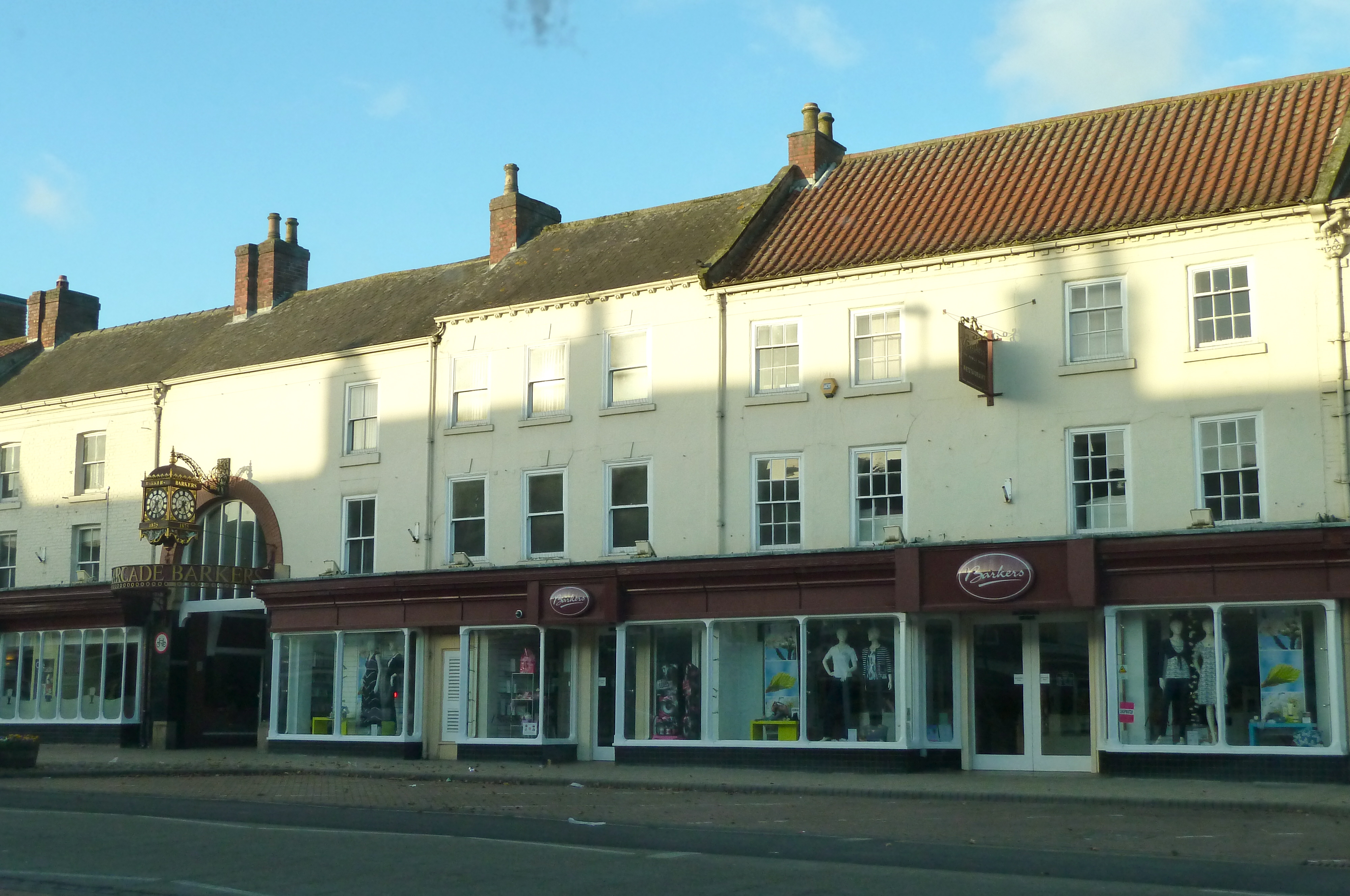
- Type: Private
- Industry: Department Store
- Founded: 1882
- Founder: William Barker
- Headquarters: Northallerton, United Kingdom
- Website: barkers.co.uk; barkershome.co.uk

Barkers (Northallerton) Limited is a family owned business that operates a department store and furniture store in Northallerton, England. The store was opened in 1882 and is a key business in Northallerton.

== History ==
In 1882, aged 14, William Barker, started an apprenticeship at the Oxendales drapers store in Northallerton. In 1907 he became a partner in the business and it was renamed Oxendale & Barker, however in 1919 the remaining shares were bought from the Oxendale family and the business became fully owned by Barker.

In 2016, Barkers Home was shortlisted for the "Excellence in Retail Display" and "Best Independent Department Store" awards at the Excellence in Housewares awards and won the Excellence in Retail Display award. The home store also won an award for its architectural design at the North and East Yorkshire Building Excellence Awards.

In 2020, previous chairman of the company, Charles Barker died of cancer. His children Guy and Charlotte also ran in the 2020 Virtual London Marathon in his honour and ended it outside the main store.

Solar panels were installed at both stores in 2021 alongside electric car charging ports at the home store and new biomass heating and LED lights, the measures were done to increase sustainability and decrease the companies carbon footprint.

== The Department Store ==
The department store which is the main division of the company is located on Northallerton's High Street and includes an arcade, called Barker's Arcade which includes smaller shops and runs through the entire building to Applegarth Park. The store offers a variety of merchandise, includes departments of womenswear, menswear, accessories (footwear, handbags, beauty, & more), lingerie, gifts and limited homewares. The store also has three different food and beverage locations the Barkers Kitchen, 1882 cafe and also the 180 capacity 1882 bistro.

=== History ===
In 2016 the womenswear department and restaurant on the first floor were renovated in a £500,000 project.

In 2020 a man broke into the store and stole 2,500 worth of luxury goods from the store. A pair also attempted to rob the store in 2019 but were captured by the police.

The area outside the store was repaved and trees were planted in 2021 to improve the town centre, Charles Barker had wanted trees outside the store in his years of running the company but these were never planted.

In 2022 then local M.P Rishi Sunak visited the store and William Barker. Sunak had previously visited the store in 2020 after the COVID-19 Lockdown.

== Barkers Home ==
The store was built in 1994 and located on the edge of Northallerton just off the A167 and lies near retailers such as Sainsbury's, B&M, Wickes and Halfords. The store is 60,000 square feet (5,600 m^{2}) and has a café called Tree View at Barkers Home. Products of the store include but are not limited to outdoor furniture, cabinetry, travel, homeware, soft furnishings, flooring, lighting, beds, bed linen and more.

=== History ===
Barkers Furnishing Store (as it was then known) opened on the edge of Northallerton in 1994 accompanying the main location, the store itself was 40,000 square feet (3,700 m^{2}).

In 2016 the store was renovated and expanded becoming 60,000 square feet (5,600 m^{2}), the expansion expanded departments and also added a bookshop and gifts department the store was also renamed from Barkers Furnishing Store to Barkers Home. The expansion cost £3.5 million.

In 2019 the home store held its 25th anniversary/silver jubilee event and held offers and promotions across the home store.
