= Wark (surname) =

Wark is a surname. Notable people with the surname include:

- Amanda Benoit-Wark (born 1976), Canadian ice hockey player
- Betty Wark (1924–2001), New Zealander social worker
- Betty Lou Wark (1937–2011), Canadian activist
- Blair Wark (1894–1941), Australian soldier
- Colin Wark (1896–1939), British composer
- David Wark (1804–1905), Canadian senator
- David Wark (Australian politician) (c. 1807–1862), Australian politician and doctor
- David Wark Griffith (1875–1948), American film director
- Doug Wark (born 1951), Scottish-American soccer player
- Ian Wark (1899–1985), Australian chemist
- Joe Wark (1947–2015), Scottish footballer
- John Wark (born 1957), Scottish footballer
- John Wark, Lord Wark (1877–1943), Scottish judge
- Ken Wark (born 1961), Australian field hockey player
- Kirsty Wark (born 1955), Scottish journalist
- McKenzie Wark (born 1961), Australian writer
- Sarah Wark (born 1986), Canadian curler
- Shelley Wark-Martyn (born 1963), Canadian politician
- Stuart Wark (born 1989), Scottish-Malaysian footballer
- Robert R. Wark (1924–2007), Canadian art historian
- Romna Wark (fl. 1478), Empress-consort of Ethiopia
- Wesley Wark (born 1952), Canadian historian

== See also ==
- Wark (disambiguation)
