= Larry Warke =

Irish cricketer and medical doctor

Personal information
- Full name: Laurence Warke
- Born: 6 May 1927; Belfast, Northern Ireland
- Died: 22 January 1989 (aged 61); Belfast, Northern Ireland
- Batting: Right-handed
- Bowling: Right-arm medium
- Relatives: Stephen Warke (son)

Domestic team information
- Years: Team
- 1950–1961: Ireland

Career statistics
Competition	First-class
Matches	17
Runs scored	405
Batting average	13.96
100s/50s	1/–
Top score	120
Balls bowled	594
Wickets	7
Bowling average	46.57
5 wickets in innings	–
10 wickets in match	–
Best bowling	1/0
Catches/stumpings	20/–
- Source: Cricinfo, 1 November 2018

Laurence 'Larry' Warke (6 May 1927 – 22 January 1989) was an Irish first-class cricketer and medical doctor.

Warke was born at Belfast in May 1927, where he was educated in the city at the Royal Belfast Academical Institution, before going up to Trinity College, Dublin to study medicine in 1944. Initially playing his club cricket for Woodvale in Northern Ireland, before switching to Dublin University, Warke made his debut in first-class cricket for Ireland against Scotland at Perth in 1950. Over the next decade, he would play regular first-class cricket for Ireland. He played his final first-class match against Scotland at Cork in 1961, by which point he had played in seventeen first-class matches for Ireland. A broad shouldered, strongly built and powerful batsman, he scored 450 runs across his seventeen first-class matches, averaging 13.96, with a highest score of 120. This score, which was his only first-class century (and the only time he passed fifty), came against Scotland in 1954. He also took seven wickets with his medium pace, though he never took more than one wicket in an innings. After qualifying as a doctor, he remained in Dublin to work as a junior doctor, where he played his club cricket for Leinster. A talented rugby union player, he played for Dublin University and Lansdowne while studying in Dublin, and later earned caps for Ulster and Leinster. He trialled for the Irish national team in 1954/55. He died at Belfast in January 1989. His son, Stephen, played cricket for Ireland in the 1980s and 1990s.
