= Stephen Warke =

Irish cricketer (born 1959)

Personal information
- Full name: Stephen John Simon Warke
- Born: 11 July 1959 (age 67); Belfast, Northern Ireland
- Batting: Right-handed
- Bowling: Right-arm off break
- Relatives: Larry Warke (father)

Domestic team information
- Years: Team
- 1981–1996: Ireland

Career statistics
| Competition | First-class | List A |
|---|---|---|
| Matches | 13 | 22 |
| Runs scored | 966 | 440 |
| Batting average | 43.90 | 20.00 |
| 100s/50s | 2/5 | –/4 |
| Top score | 144* | 82 |
| Balls bowled | 30 | 0 |
| Wickets | 0 | – |
| Bowling average | – | – |
| 5 wickets in innings | – | – |
| 10 wickets in match | – | – |
| Best bowling | – | – |
| Catches/stumpings | 8/– | 8/– |
- Source: Cricinfo, 1 November 2018

Stephen John Simon Warke (born 11 July 1959), in North Belfast, is an Irish former cricketer and national captain.

== Cricket career ==
A right-handed opening batsman, when he retired in 1996 Warke held the national record for most caps, with 114. His 4,275 runs for Ireland was also a record.

Warke was selected to captain Ireland in their maiden ICC Trophy event, in Kenya in 1994, but withdrew due to injury.
