= Wark =

Wark or WARK may refer to:

- Wark (surname), including a list of people with the surname
- Wark (river), a river in Luxembourg
- WARK (AM), talk radio station in Hagerstown, Maryland
- Wark on Tweed, a village in Carham parish, in the north of England bordering Scotland
- Wark on Tyne, a village in the north of England near Kielder reservoir

== See also ==
- Mar's Wark in Stirling
- King's Wark in Leith
