= Wark in Tyndale Castle =

Castle in Northumberland, England

Coordinates: 55°05′08″N 2°13′10″W

Wark in Tyndale Castle was a medieval building in the English county of Northumberland (grid reference NY861768). It was first mentioned in 1399–1400, but a motte and bailey castle occupied the site since the 12th century.
