= North Yorkshire Council elections =

Local government elections in North Yorkshire, England

North Yorkshire Council elections are generally held every four years. From 1974 until 2023 the council was called North Yorkshire County Council and it was an upper tier county council, with district-level functions being provided by the area's district councils. The districts were all abolished with effect from 1 April 2023, at which point the county council became a unitary authority, taking on the functions of the abolished district councils. The county council changed its name to North Yorkshire Council to coincide with the change in its powers.

== Council elections ==
There was no election in 2021 because of proposals to turn the county council into a unitary authority. The council elected in 2022 will remain in post until 2027, after which elections will revert to being every four years.

- 2001 North Yorkshire County Council election
- 2005 North Yorkshire County Council election
- 2009 North Yorkshire County Council election
- 2013 North Yorkshire County Council election
- 2017 North Yorkshire County Council election
- 2022 North Yorkshire Council election

== County result maps ==
2005 results map

2009 results map

2013 results map

2017 results map

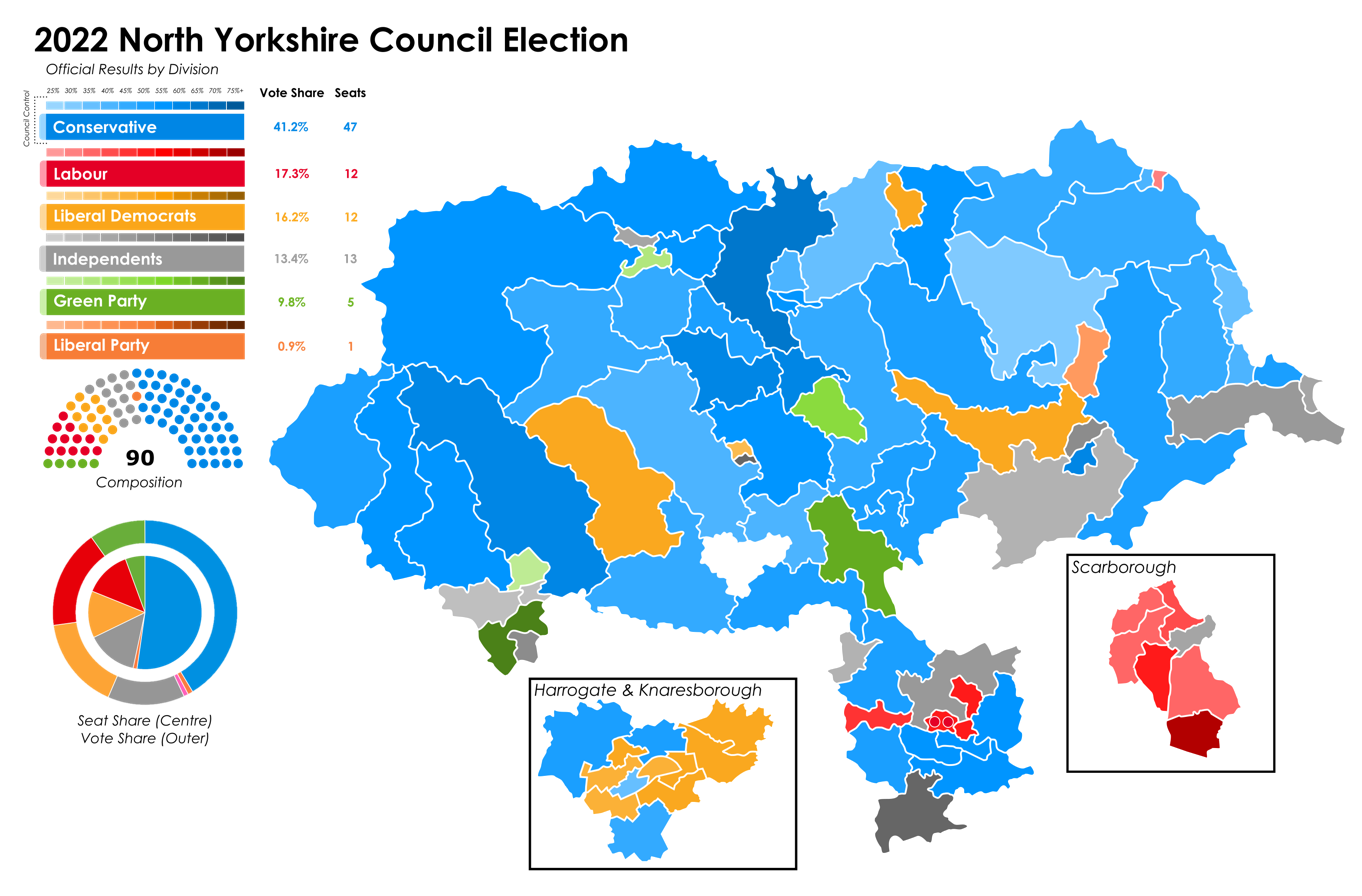
2022 results map

== By-election results ==
The following is an incomplete list of by-elections to North Yorkshire County Council.

=== 2001–2005 ===
Cayton by-election, 15 July 2004
Party	Candidate	Votes	%	±%
Conservative	John Blackburn	1,466	75.1	+39.2
Labour	Simon Turner	485	24.9	+3.2
Majority		981	50.3	
Turnout		1,951		
Conservative gain from Independent		Swing		

By-election following death of Denis Pedder.

=== 2009–2013 ===
Thornton Dale and the Wolds by-election, 27 October 2011
Party	Candidate	Votes	%	±%
Conservative	Janet Sanderson	1,122	66.2	+4.7
Liberal Democrats	Michael Beckett	574	33.8	+4.1
Majority		548	32.3	
Turnout		1,696		
Conservative hold		Swing		

By-election following resignation of Ron Haigh.

Central Richmondshire by-election, 3 May 2012
Party	Candidate	Votes	%	±%
Independent	Helen Grant	588	43.7	+43.7
Conservative	Steph Todd	553	41.1	−3.4
Labour	Eric Beechey	205	15.2	+10.3
Majority		35	2.6	
Turnout		1,346		
Independent gain from Conservative		Swing		

By-election following resignation of Melva Steckles.

=== 2013–2017 ===
South Selby by-election, 10 October 2013
Party	Candidate	Votes	%	±%
Conservative	Mike Jordan	592	37.0	−3.2
Labour	Rod Price	525	32.8	−1.6
UKIP	Colin Heath	282	17.6	+17.6
Independent	David McSherry	201	12.6	−5.7
Majority		67	4.2	
Turnout		1,600		
Conservative hold		Swing		

By-election following death of Margaret Hulme.

Skipton West by-election, 2 July 2014
Party	Candidate	Votes	%	±%
Independent	Andrew Solloway	391	23.4	−0.2
Conservative	Paul Whitaker	355	21.3	+0.9
Liberal Democrats	Paul English	309	18.5	−10.1
UKIP	Roger Baxandall	238	14.3	+14.3
Green	Claire Nash	194	11.6	−4.0
Labour	Andrew Rankine	181	10.9	−0.9
Majority		36	2.2	
Turnout		1,668		
Independent gain from Liberal Democrats		Swing		

By-election following death of Polly English.

Northallerton by-election, 26 May 2016
Party	Candidate	Votes	%	±%
Conservative	Caroline Dickinson	654	48.3	−4.1
UKIP	Stephen Place	278	20.5	−10.6
Labour	David Tickle	233	17.2	+0.7
Yorkshire First	Christopher Pearson	131	9.7	+9.7
Green	Michael Chaloner	58	4.3	+4.3
Majority		376	27.8	
Turnout		1,354		
Conservative hold		Swing		

By-election following death of Tony Hall.

=== 2017–2022 ===
Knaresborough by-election, 16 August 2018
Party	Candidate	Votes	%	±%
Liberal Democrats	David Goode	2,051	54.9	+20.1
Conservative	Philip Ireland	1,313	35.2	−3.3
Labour	Sharon-Theresa Calvert	369	9.9	−1.4
Majority		738	19.7	
Turnout		3,744	30.3	
Liberal Democrats gain from Conservative		Swing	+11.7%	

By-election following resignation of Nicola Faris.

Upper Dales by-election, 17 October 2019
Party	Candidate	Votes	%	±%
Conservative	Yvonne Peacock	884	45.7	+16.2
Independent	Jill McMullon	741	38.3	+38.3
Liberal Democrats	Simon Crosby	204	10.5	+10.5
Green	Kevin Foster	107	5.5	+0.4
Majority		143	7.4	
Turnout		1,936	41.5	
Conservative gain from Independent		Swing		

By-election following death of John Blackie.

Bilton and Nidd Gorge by-election, 6 May 2021
Party	Candidate	Votes	%	±%
Conservative	Matt Scott	1,991	42.6	+10.4
Liberal Democrats	Andrew Kempston-Parkes	1,639	35.1	+6.9
Labour	Tyler Reeton	434	9.3	−3.8%
Green	Arnold Warneken	430	9.2	New
Yorkshire	John Hall	136	2.9	New
Independent	Harvey Alexander	46	1	−17.9
Majority		352	7.5	
Turnout		4,696	37.4	
Conservative gain from Liberal Democrats		Swing	+14.15%	

By-election following death of Geoff Webber.

Ribblesdale by-election, 6 May 2021
Party	Candidate	Votes	%	±%
Conservative	David Staveley	1,537	54.2	−11.1
Labour	Brian McDaid	475	16.7	−18.0
Liberal Democrats	Luke Allan	430	15.2	+15.2
Green	David Noland	395	13.9	+13.9
Majority		1,062	37.4	
Turnout		2,837	44.0	
Conservative hold		Swing		

By-election following death of Richard Welch.

=== 2022–2026 ===
Masham and Fountains by-election, 9 February 2023
Party	Candidate	Votes	%	±%
Liberal Democrats	Felicity Cunliffe-Lister	1,349	62.7	+37.2
Conservative	Victoria Brooke Hull	801	37.3	−6.9
Majority		548	25.5	
Turnout		2,150	35.5	
Liberal Democrats gain from Conservative		Swing	+37.2	

By-election following death of Margaret Atkinson.

Eastfield by-election, 25 May 2023
Party	Candidate	Votes	%	±%
Independent	Tony Randerson	499	46.4	+46.4
Liberal Democrats	Erica Willett	281	26.1	+26.1
Labour	David Thompson	169	15.7	−57.6
Conservative	Eric Batts	69	6.4	−16.0
Independent	Tim Thorne	39	3.6	+3.6
Green	Will Forbes	19	1.8	−2.5
Majority		218	20.3	
Turnout		1,076		
Independent gain from Labour		Swing		

By-election following resignation of Tony Randerson, who contested the by-election as an independent.

Hutton Rudby and Osmotherley by-election, 28 September 2023
Party	Candidate	Votes	%	±%
Conservative	David Hugill	954	48.4	+8.9
Liberal Democrats	Duncan Ross Russell	747	37.9	+14.2
Green	Allan Mortimer	243	12.3	+12.3
Yorkshire	Lee Derrick	27	1.4	+1.4
Majority		207	10.5	
Turnout		1,971		
Conservative hold		Swing		

By-election following resignation of Bridget Fortune.

Sowerby and Topcliffe by-election, 30 November 2023
Party	Candidate	Votes	%	±%
Liberal Democrats	Dan Sladden	764	41.2	+41.2
Conservative	Dave Elders	480	25.9	−22.2
Green	John Law	306	16.5	−35.4
Labour	Helen Tomlinson	250	13.5	+13.5
Yorkshire	John Hall	35	1.9	+1.9
Monster Raving Loony	Stew Exotic	20	1.1	+1.1
Majority		284	15.3	
Turnout		1,855		
Liberal Democrats gain from Green		Swing		

By-election following resignation of Dave Whitfield.

Stray, Woodlands and Hookstone by-election, 11 April 2024
Party	Candidate	Votes	%	±%
Liberal Democrats	Andrew Timothy	1,094	43.8	−7.8
Conservative	John Ennis	768	30.8	−4.0
Green	Gilly Charters	376	15.1	+15.1
Reform	Jonathan Swales	141	5.7	+5.7
Labour	Geoff Foxall	116	4.6	−2.6
Majority		326	13.1	
Turnout		2,495		
Liberal Democrats hold		Swing		

By-election following resignation of Patricia Marsh.

Eastfield by-election, 19 June 2025
Party	Candidate	Votes	%	±%
Reform	Tom Seston	538	62.7	+62.7
Labour	Hazel Smith	121	14.1	−1.6
Social Justice Party	Helen Williams	118	13.8	+13.8
Conservative	Helen Baker	40	4.7	−1.7
Liberal Democrats	Mark Harrison	24	2.8	−23.3
Green	Kieran Wade	17	2.0	+0.2
Majority		417	20.3	
Turnout		858		
Reform gain from Independent		Swing		

By-election following resignation of Tony Randerson.
