= 2017 North Yorkshire County Council election =

2017 UK local government election

← 2013	4 May 2017	2022 →

All 72 seats to North Yorkshire County Council 37 seats needed for a majority
	First party	Second party	Third party
Leader	Carl Les		Eric Broadbent
Party	Conservative	Independent	Labour
Leader's seat	Catterick Bridge		Northstead
Seats before	45	8	7
Seats won	55	10	4
Seat change	▲10	▲2	▼3
	Fourth party	Fifth party
Leader	Bill Hoult (retiring)	Sam Cross
Party	Liberal Democrats	UKIP
Leader's seat	Knaresborough	Filey (defeated)
Seats before	8	2
Seats won	3	0
Seat change	▼5	▼2
- Map showing the results of the 2017 North Yorkshire County Council election. Striped divisions have mixed representation.
Council control before election
Conservative
Council control after election
Conservative

The 2017 North Yorkshire County Council election was held on 4 May 2017 as part of the 2017 local elections in the United Kingdom. All 72 councillors were elected from 68 electoral divisions which each returned either one or two county councillors by first-past-the-post voting for a four-year term of office.

In common with many other local elections that year, the election was highly successful for the ruling Conservative Party, who won the largest majority in the authority's history (they had previously won more seats in 1977, but this happened when the council still included the city of York, resulting in there being more seats on the council overall), primarily at the expense of the Liberal Democrats, who were reduced to just three seats and fell behind the Labour Party; Labour experienced similarly heavy losses, though not to quite the same extent as their nadir in 2009, when they had been reduced to just one seat. As a result, the North Yorkshire Independent group became the largest opposition grouping.

This was the last election in the council's form prior to the next election in 2022, when it was reformed as the unitary North Yorkshire Council.

== Results ==
Party	Councillors				Votes		
Party		Of total	Net			Of total	Net
Conservative Party	55	76.4%	+10	55 / 72	84,420	53.3%	+11.9%
Labour Party	4	5.6%	-3	4 / 72	25,016	15.8%	-0.1%
Liberal Democrats	3	4.2%	-5	3 / 72	17,862	11.3%	+1.9%
Independent	10	13.9%	+2	10 / 72	15,068	9.5%	-3.1%
Green	0	0.0%	0	0 / 72	8,509	5.4%	+2.5%
UKIP	0	0.0%	-2	0 / 72	5,306	3.3%	-12.6%
Liberal	0	0.0%	-2	0 / 72	1,792	1.1%	-0.7%
Yorkshire	0	0.0%	New	0 / 72	473	0.3%	New

== Divisional results ==
=== Craven district (7 seats) ===
Craven

Airedale
Party	Candidate	Votes	%	±%
Conservative	Patrick Mulligan*	1,404	56.1	−3.8
Labour	Bill Mercer	597	23.8	+3.0
Green	Andrew Brown	503	20.1	N/A
Majority		807	32.3	−6.8
Conservative hold		Swing		

Mid-Craven
Party	Candidate	Votes	%	±%
Conservative	Gill Quinn	2,201	75.7	+18.7
Labour	John Pope	706	24.3	+15.4
Majority		1,495	51.4	+21.0
Conservative hold		Swing		

North Craven
Party	Candidate	Votes	%	±%
Conservative	David Ireton*	1,648	65.6	+10.2
Green	Sarah Wiltshire	866	34.4	N/A
Majority		782	31.2	−1.1
Conservative hold		Swing		

Ribblesdale
Party	Candidate	Votes	%	±%
Conservative	Richard Welch	1,597	65.3	+19.7
Labour	Michael Rose	847	34.7	+20.6
Majority		750	30.6	+25.4
Conservative hold		Swing		

Skipton East
Party	Candidate	Votes	%	±%
Independent	Robert Heseltine*	1,174	46.7	−7.4
Conservative	Christopher Harbron	733	29.2	+14.3
Labour	Chris Rose	382	15.2	+4.2
Green	David Noland	225	8.9	+2.1
Majority		441	17.5	−21.7
Independent hold		Swing		

Skipton West
Party	Candidate	Votes	%	±%
Independent	Andy Solloway	782	30.8	+7.2
Conservative	Jonathan Kerr	715	28.1	+7.7
Labour	Peter Madeley	591	23.2	+11.5
Liberal Democrats	Eric Jaquin	274	10.8	−17.9
Green	Claire Nash	181	7.1	−8.5
Majority		67	2.7	−2.4
Independent gain from Liberal Democrats		Swing		

South Craven
Party	Candidate	Votes	%	±%
Independent	Philip Barrett	1,350	68.4	+4.9
Conservative	Richard Foster	433	21.9	N/A
Labour	Vin Keirle	190	9.6	+1.5
Majority		917	46.5	+11.5
Independent hold		Swing		

=== Hambleton district (11 seats) ===
Hambleton

Bedale
Party	Candidate	Votes	%	±%
Conservative	John Weighell*	1,653	73.1	+20.3
Green	Michael Chaloner	372	16.5	N/A
Labour	Anne Mannix	235	10.4	+2.9
Majority		1,281	56.6	+24.2
Conservative hold		Swing		

Easingwold
Party	Candidate	Votes	%	±%
Conservative	Peter Sowray*	1,327	71.2	+0.1
Independent	Richard Larder	665	28.7	N/A
Majority		662	42.5	+0.2
Conservative hold		Swing		

Great Ayton
Party	Candidate	Votes	%	±%
Conservative	Heather Moorhouse*	1,514	68.9	+16.9
Labour	Alison Jarvis	339	15.4	+1.9
Liberal Democrats	Nicholas Land	281	12.8	+4.7
Green	Jim Peters	63	2.9	N/A
Majority		1,175	53.5	+27.9
Conservative hold		Swing		

North Hambleton
Party	Candidate	Votes	%	±%
Conservative	David Hugill	1,508	68.8	+4.2
Liberal Democrats	Roger Hole	314	14.3	N/A
Labour	Charmian Walter	243	11.1	−3.6
Green	John Yorke	127	5.8	N/A
Majority		1,194	54.5	+10.6
Conservative hold		Swing		

Northallerton
Party	Candidate	Votes	%	±%
Conservative	Caroline Dickinson	1,047	61.5	+9.1
Labour	Hugo Radice	286	16.8	+0.3
UKIP	Claire Palmer	259	15.2	−15.9
Green	Margaret Lowndes	110	6.5	N/A
Majority		761	44.7	+23.4
Conservative hold		Swing		

Romanby and Broomfield
Party	Candidate	Votes	%	±%
Conservative	David Blades*	1,347	54.4	+0.1
Labour	Brian Hazeldine	400	16.2	−4.5
Yorkshire	Chris Pearson	365	14.8	N/A
UKIP	Stephen Place	217	8.8	−16.1
Green	Patricia Tricker	145	5.9	N/A
Majority		947	38.2	+8.8
Conservative hold		Swing		

Sowerby
Party	Candidate	Votes	%	±%
Conservative	Bob Baker*	1,279	57.6	−1.5
Liberal Democrats	Christopher Gammie	941	42.4	N/A
Majority		338	15.2	−20.6
Conservative hold		Swing		

Stillington
Party	Candidate	Votes	%	±%
Conservative	Caroline Patmore*	Unopposed		
Majority				
Conservative hold		Swing		

Stokesley
Party	Candidate	Votes	%	±%
Liberal Democrats	Bryn Griffiths*	1,288	45.9	+11.8
Conservative	Richard Hudson	1,278	45.5	+14.4
Labour	Kathryn Maccoll	240	8.6	−8.7
Majority		10	0.4	−2.6
Liberal Democrats hold		Swing		

Swale
Party	Candidate	Votes	%	±%
Conservative	Annabel Wilkinson	1,682	75.1	+12.7
Green	Fiona Yorke	316	14.0	N/A
Labour	John Blevins	245	10.9	−1.9
Majority		1,376	61.1	+23.5
Conservative hold		Swing		

Thirsk
Party	Candidate	Votes	%	±%
Conservative	Gareth Dadd	Unopposed		
Majority				
Conservative hold		Swing		

=== Harrogate district (18 seats) ===
Harrogate

Ainsty
Party	Candidate	Votes	%	±%
Conservative	Andy Paraskos	1,922	68.0	+33.8
Liberal Democrats	Simon Oldroyd	396	14.0	N/A
Labour	Guy Allanson	329	11.6	+1.8
Green	Elizabeth Collins	178	6.3	N/A
Majority		1,526	54.0	+51.5
Conservative gain from Liberal		Swing		

Boroughbridge
Party	Candidate	Votes	%	±%
Conservative	Robert Windass*	2,032	75.5	+27.8
Liberal Democrats	Alistair Gavins	435	16.2	N/A
Labour	Monica Uden	225	8.4	−1.1
Majority		1597	59.3	+41.3
Conservative hold		Swing		

Harrogate Bilton and Nidd Gorge (2)
Party	Candidate	Votes	%	±%
Conservative	Paul Haslam	1,618	38.0	
Liberal Democrats	Geoff Webber	1,414	33.2	
Liberal Democrats	Mark McDermid	1,285	30.2	
Conservative	Graham Swift	1,207	28.4	
Independent	Andrew Goss*	951	22.3	
Labour	David Humphries	660	15.5	
Labour	Nicholas Knott	544	12.8	
UKIP	Bob Frendt	378	8.9	
Majority				
Conservative gain from UKIP		Swing		
Liberal Democrats hold		Swing		

Andrew Goss was originally elected as a member of the Liberal Democrats in the 2013 North Yorkshire County Council election, however he left the party and proceeded to stand as an independent. The reflected change in the vote for Goss is taken from his vote share as a Liberal Democrat candidate in 2013.

Harrogate Central (2)
Party	Candidate	Votes	%	±%
Conservative	Richard Cooper*	2,278	55.3	
Conservative	John Mann	1,967	47.8	
Liberal Democrats	Margaret-Ann de Courcey-Bayley	1,098	26.7	
Liberal Democrats	Simon Bush	1,091	26.5	
Labour	Kevin Bolt	609	14.8	
Labour	Paul Whitmore	559	13.6	
UKIP	Hugh Whiteside	261	6.3	
Majority				
Conservative hold		Swing		
Conservative hold		Swing		

Harrogate Harlow
Party	Candidate	Votes	%	±%
Conservative	Jim Clark*	1,746	68.5	+16.9
Green	Kathy Foley	441	17.3	N/A
Labour	Liz Charnley	362	14.2	+6.3
Majority		1,305	51.2	+23.7
Conservative hold		Swing		

Harrogate Oatlands
Party	Candidate	Votes	%	±%
Conservative	John Ennis*	1,446	51.1	+11.1
Liberal Democrats	Pat Marsh	1,151	40.6	+4.1
Labour	Patricia Foxall	140	4.9	−2.7
Green	Boadecea Macleod	95	3.4	N/A
Majority		295	10.5	+7.0
Conservative hold		Swing		

Harrogate Saltergate
Party	Candidate	Votes	%	±%
Conservative	Don Mackenzie*	1,426	61.7	+11.8
Liberal Democrats	Matthew Webber	485	21.0	+5.5
Labour	Catherine Carter	186	8.0	+0.2
UKIP	David Thompson	120	5.2	−14.0
Green	Shaun Lowry	94	4.1	−3.4
Majority		941	40.7	+10.0
Conservative hold		Swing		

Harrogate Starbeck
Party	Candidate	Votes	%	±%
Liberal Democrats	Philip Broadbank	1,134	53.4	+3.9
Conservative	Philip Dixon	624	29.4	+12.5
Labour	Geoff Foxall	202	9.5	−2.2
UKIP	Chris Royston	90	4.2	−17.8
Green	Greig Sharman	72	3.4	N/A
Majority		510	24.0	−3.5
Liberal Democrats hold		Swing		

Knaresborough (2)
Party	Candidate	Votes	%	±%
Conservative	Nicola Wilson	1,829	40.3	
Conservative	Zoe Metcalfe	1,676	36.9	
Liberal Democrats	David Goode	1,645	36.3	
Liberal Democrats	James Monaghan	1,618	35.7	
Labour	Paul Burns	537	11.8	
Labour	Diane Maguire	474	10.4	
Green	Shan Oakes	405	8.9	
Green	Bill Rigby	336	7.4	
UKIP	Tim Hunter	322	7.1	
Majority				
Conservative gain from Liberal Democrats		Swing		
Conservative gain from Liberal Democrats		Swing		

Lower Nidderdale and Bishop Monkton
Party	Candidate	Votes	%	±%
Conservative	Michael Harrison*	2,056	79.8	+24.6
Green	Paul Trewhitt	309	12.0	N/A
Labour	Matt Forth	213	8.3	−0.9
Majority		1,747	67.8	+37.4
Conservative hold		Swing		

Masham and Fountains
Party	Candidate	Votes	%	±%
Conservative	Margaret Atkinson*	1,788	71.5	+13.6
Liberal Democrats	Angela Hosie	372	14.9	+5.8
Labour	Alan Woodhead	229	9.2	−0.5
UKIP	Emma Quigley	113	4.5	−18.9
Majority		1,416	56.6	+22.1
Conservative hold		Swing		

Pannal and Lower Wharfedale
Party	Candidate	Votes	%	±%
Conservative	Cliff Trotter*	2,007	74.0	+12.4
Green	Gillian Charters	455	16.8	+8.2
Labour	Helen Evison	251	9.3	±0.0
Majority		1,552	57.2	+16.1
Conservative hold		Swing		

Pateley Bridge
Party	Candidate	Votes	%	±%
Conservative	Stanley Lumley	1,618	56.5	+1.9
Liberal Democrats	Helen Flynn	1,030	36.0	+18.5
Labour	David Brackley	153	5.3	−2.9
UKIP	Harvey Alexander	64	2.2	−17.5
Majority		588	20.5	−14.4
Conservative hold		Swing		

Ripon North
Party	Candidate	Votes	%	±%
Conservative	Mike Chambers	985	43.9	+10.2
Independent	Sid Hawke	684	30.5	+2.8
Green	Elizabeth Barclay	215	9.6	N/A
Labour	Kieran Young	210	9.4	−2.1
UKIP	Malcolm Gatford	149	6.6	−20.5
Majority		301	13.4	+7.4
Conservative hold		Swing		

Ripon South
Party	Candidate	Votes	%	±%
Conservative	Stuart Martin	902	46.2	+15.4
Independent	Peter Horton	760	39.0	+4.4
Labour	Lorna Jasper	119	6.1	−0.1
UKIP	Jeremy Banyard	93	4.8	−19.0
Liberal Democrats	Peter Flynn	77	3.9	−0.6
Majority		242	7.2	+3.8
Conservative gain from Independent		Swing		

=== Richmondshire district (6 seats) ===
Richmondshire

Catterick Bridge
Party	Candidate	Votes	%	±%
Conservative	Carl Les	1,187	64.4	+17.5
Independent	Angie Dale	284	15.4	N/A
Liberal Democrats	Jane Parlour	176	9.6	N/A
Labour	Gill Page	110	6.0	+1.9
Green	Dave Walton	85	4.6	+0.1
Majority		903	49.0	+30.2
Conservative hold		Swing		

Central Richmondshire
Party	Candidate	Votes	%	±%
Independent	Helen Grant*	693	40.7	+1.2
Conservative	Lawrence Grose	573	33.7	+9.4
Labour	Ian Davidson	134	7.9	+2.2
UKIP	Dave Robertson	112	6.6	−23.9
Independent	Martin Smith	92	5.4	N/A
Green	Rupert Hildyard	59	3.5	N/A
Liberal Democrats	Rupert Hildyard	38	2.2	N/A
Majority		120	7.0	−2.0
Independent hold		Swing		

Middle Dales
Party	Candidate	Votes	%	±%
Conservative	Karin Sedgwick	1,590	73.1	+33.0
Liberal Democrats	Philip Wicks	225	10.3	+1.9
Labour	Owain Gardner	212	9.8	+2.4
Green	Lisle Ryder	147	6.8	+2.6
Majority		1,365	62.8	+45.1
Conservative hold		Swing		

Richmond
Party	Candidate	Votes	%	±%
Independent	Stuart Parsons*	1,250	53.2	−1.5
Conservative	Louise Dickins	604	25.7	−0.2
Liberal Democrats	Philip Knowles	185	7.9	N/A
Labour	Ann Brewer	180	7.7	+2.1
Green	Anna Jackson	130	5.5	N/A
Majority		646	27.5	−1.3
Independent hold		Swing		

Richmondshire North
Party	Candidate	Votes	%	±%
Conservative	Angus Thompson	1,629	71.5	+28.5
Liberal Democrats	Andrew Atkins	254	11.1	N/A
Green	Leslie Rowe	208	9.1	+5.3
Labour	Ken Smith	188	8.2	+2.0
Majority		1,374	60.4	+44.8
Conservative hold		Swing		

Upper Dales
Party	Candidate	Votes	%	±%
Independent	John Blackie*	1,540	61.4	−15.9
Conservative	Yvonne Peacock	740	29.5	+14.4
Green	Robbie Kelly	129	5.1	+1.9
Labour	Brian Pocknee	99	3.9	−0.6
Majority		800	31.9	−30.3
Independent hold		Swing		

=== Ryedale district (6 seats) ===
Ryedale

Hovingham and Sheriff Hutton
Party	Candidate	Votes	%	±%
Conservative	Caroline Goodrick	1,573	59.6	−15.4
Liberal Democrats	Chris Pickles	756	28.7	+18.7
Labour	Helen Broxup-Yellen	224	8.5	−6.4
Liberal	Mike Potter	85	3.2	N/A
Majority		817	30.9	−29.2
Conservative hold		Swing		

Kirkbymoorside
Party	Candidate	Votes	%	±%
Conservative	Val Arnold*	1,578	59.9	+4.6
Liberal Democrats	Steven Mason	485	18.4	N/A
Green	Martin Brampton	260	9.9	N/A
Labour	Vic Hoyland	241	9.1	−2.7
Liberal	Joy Andrews	20	2.7	−9.3
Majority		1,093	41.5	+7.1
Conservative hold		Swing		

Malton
Party	Candidate	Votes	%	±%
Independent	Lindsay Burr*	1,554	61.9	+22.5
Conservative	Michael Cleary	956	38.1	+6.6
Majority		598	23.8	+15.9
Independent gain from Liberal Democrats		Swing		

Lindsay Burr was originally elected as a member of the Liberal Democrats in the 2013 North Yorkshire County Council election, however she left the party and proceeded to stand as an independent. The reflected change in the vote for Burr is taken from her vote share as a Liberal Democrat candidate in 2013.

Norton
Party	Candidate	Votes	%	±%
Conservative	Keane Duncan	1,599	58.3	+32.5
Liberal Democrats	Elizabeth Shields*	715	26.1	−3.0
Liberal	Tim Thornton	429	15.6	N/A
Majority		884	32.2	+28.9
Conservative gain from Liberal Democrats		Swing		

Pickering
Party	Candidate	Votes	%	±%
Conservative	Greg White	1,210	44.5	+4.8
Liberal	John Clark*	1,208	44.4	+2.7
Labour	Alan Avery	300	11.0	+2.0
Majority		2	0.1	−1.9
Conservative gain from Liberal		Swing		

Thornton Dale and The Wolds
Party	Candidate	Votes	%	±%
Conservative	Janet Sanderson*	1,712	69.5	+2.2
Green	Sandra Bell	450	18.3	N/A
Labour	Mick Johnson	301	12.2	−7.2
Majority		1,262	51.2	+3.3
Conservative hold		Swing		

=== Scarborough district (14 seats) ===
Scarborough

Castle
Party	Candidate	Votes	%	±%
Independent	Janet Jefferson*	717	47.4	+1.6
Labour	Mat Watkinson	414	27.3	+1.9
Conservative	Tom Seston	164	10.8	+0.4
UKIP	Tim Thorne	151	10.0	−7.8
Green	Mark Vesey	68	4.5	N/A
Majority		303	20.1	−0.3
Independent hold		Swing		

Eastfield and Osgodby
Party	Candidate	Votes	%	±%
Labour	Tony Randerson	707	56.3	+23.9
Conservative	Tracey White	463	37.3	+18.8
Green	Tony Johnson	80	6.4	N/A
Majority		239	19.0	+6.2
Labour hold		Swing		

Esk Valley
Party	Candidate	Votes	%	±%
Conservative	Clive Pearson	1,299	67.6	+21.0
Labour	Keith Jeffery	340	17.7	−5.9
Green	Sara Fernander	174	9.1	N/A
UKIP	John Thistle	109	5.7	−15.9
Majority		959	49.9	+26.9
Conservative hold		Swing		

Falsgrave and Stepney
Party	Candidate	Votes	%	±%
Labour	Liz Colling	720	35.4	+7.0
Green	David Malone	650	32.0	+15.1
Conservative	Jane Mortimer	460	22.6	+13.1
UKIP	Sally Longden	202	9.9	−14.7
Majority		70	3.4	−0.4
Labour hold		Swing		

Filey
Party	Candidate	Votes	%	±%
Conservative	Helen Swiers	789	44.0	+34.2
UKIP	Sam Cross*	762	42.5	−1.0
Green	David King	244	13.6	N/A
Majority		27	1.5	−5.3
Conservative gain from UKIP		Swing		

Hertford and Cayton
Party	Candidate	Votes	%	±%
Conservative	Roberta Swiers	1,240	57.2	+12.6
Labour	Rosie Adams	373	17.2	+2.4
UKIP	John Casey	360	16.6	−18.0
Green	Judy Deans	115	5.3	N/A
Labour	Sean Rowell	80	3.7	N/A
Majority		867	40.0	+30.0
Conservative hold		Swing		

Newby
Party	Candidate	Votes	%	±%
Conservative	Andrew Backhouse	752	46.4	+6.9
Labour	Paul Provins	480	29.6	+5.2
UKIP	Graham Snelson	170	10.5	N/A
Green	Helen Kindness	111	6.8	+0.7
Yorkshire	Bill Black	108	6.7	N/A
Majority		272	16.8	+1.3
Conservative hold		Swing		

Northstead
Party	Candidate	Votes	%	±%
Labour	Eric Broadbent*	682	40.8	+8.5
Conservative	Christopher Fisher	444	26.6	+12.3
Liberal Democrats	John Atkinson	216	12.9	+10.7
UKIP	Norman Murphy	208	12.5	−16.6
Majority		238	14.2	11.0
Labour hold		Swing		

Scalby and The Coast
Party	Candidate	Votes	%	±%
Conservative	Derek Bastiman*	1,380	54.1	+8.0
Labour	Gerald Dennett	531	20.8	+6.4
Liberal Democrats	David Taylor	378	13.8	+9.9
UKIP	Paul McCann	260	10.2	−16.9
Majority		829	33.3	+14.3
Conservative hold		Swing		

Seamer and Derwent Valley
Party	Candidate	Votes	%	±%
Conservative	David Jeffels*	1,352	53.4	+14.9
Liberal Democrats	Robert Lockwood	413	16.3	N/A
UKIP	Mark Harland	385	15.2	−18.9
Labour	Colin Barnes	383	15.1	+5.2
Majority		913	37.1	+32.7
Conservative hold		Swing		

Weaponness and Ramshill
Party	Candidate	Votes	%	±%
Conservative	Callum Walsh	861	42.8	+12.6
Labour	Steve Siddons	789	39.2	+22.6
Green	Charlotte Bonner	193	9.6	+4.1
UKIP	Stuart Abbott	170	8.4	−14.7
Majority		72	3.6	−3.5
Conservative hold		Swing		

Whitby/Mayfield Cum Mulgrave
Party	Candidate	Votes	%	±%
Conservative	David Chance*	1,246	62.8	+22.6
Labour	Hugo Fearnley	737	37.2	+14.1
Majority		509	25.6	+8.5
Conservative hold		Swing		

Whitby/Streonshalh
Party	Candidate	Votes	%	±%
Conservative	Joe Plant*	747	43.2	+5.2
Labour	Rob Barnett	719	41.6	+7.6
Liberal Democrats	Jonathan Harston	133	7.7	N/A
UKIP	Deirdre Abbott	131	7.6	−14.0
Majority		28	1.6	−2.4
Conservative hold		Swing		

Woodlands
Party	Candidate	Votes	%	±%
Conservative	Andrew Jenkinson	520	34.4	+17.1
Labour	David Billing*	451	29.8	+1.7
UKIP	Phil McDonald	220	14.6	−11.2
Independent	Bill Chatt	207	13.7	−7.4
Green	Chris Phillips	114	7.5	+3.5
Majority		69	4.6	+2.3
Conservative gain from Labour		Swing		

=== Selby district (9 seats) ===
Selby

Cawood and Saxton
Party	Candidate	Votes	%	±%
Conservative	Andrew Lee*	1,251	67.8	+1.2
Labour	Andrew Lowe	378	20.4	−13.0
Liberal Democrats	James Ronicle	217	11.8	N/A
Majority		873	47.3	+14.1
Conservative hold		Swing		

Escrick
Party	Candidate	Votes	%	±%
Conservative	Richard Musgrave	1,515	65.2	+8.2
Labour	David Haley	526	22.6	+6.2
Liberal Democrats	James Mills	284	12.2	N/A
Majority		989	42.6	+2.0
Conservative hold		Swing		

Mid Selby
Party	Candidate	Votes	%	±%
Conservative	Chris Pearson*	1,382	68.9	+28.0
Labour	Arthur Taylor	510	25.4	+0.1
Liberal Democrats	Ruth Mills	113	5.6	N/A
Majority		872	43.5	+36.4
Conservative hold		Swing		

Osgoldcross
Party	Candidate	Votes	%	±%
Independent	John McCartney*	1,219	51.6	−0.8
Conservative	Dave Peart	845	35.7	+4.4
Labour	Eric Beechey	249	10.5	−5.8
Liberal Democrats	Shawn Imeson	51	2.2	N/A
Majority		374	15.9	−5.2
Independent hold		Swing		

Selby Barlby
Party	Candidate	Votes	%	±%
Conservative	Karl Arthur	1,596	45.2	+16.9
Labour	Steph Duckett	1,577	44.7	−0.2
Labour	Steve Shaw-Wright*	1,558		
Conservative	Colin Heath	1,489		
Liberal Democrats	Paul Welbourn	355	10.1	N/A
Majority				
Conservative gain from Labour		Swing		
Labour hold		Swing		

Selby Brayton
Party	Candidate	Votes	%	±%
Conservative	Cliff Lunn*	1,534	67.2	+10.8
Labour	Paul Welch	584	25.6	−18.0
Liberal Democrats	Dean Welbourn	163	7.2	N/A
Majority		950	41.6	+28.8
Conservative hold		Swing		

Sherburn in Elmet
Party	Candidate	Votes	%	±%
Conservative	Mel Hobson	1,604	57.7	+18.6
Labour	Steve Howley	1,001	36.0	−3.6
Liberal Democrats	Hugh Kelly	176	6.3	N/A
Majority		603	21.7	+21.2
Conservative gain from Labour		Swing		

South Selby
Party	Candidate	Votes	%	±%
Conservative	Mike Jordan	1,341	63.5	+23.3
Labour	Dave Leake	655	31.0	−3.4
Liberal Democrats	Barbara Smith	115	5.4	N/A
Majority		686	32.5	+24.7
Conservative hold		Swing		

Tadcaster
Party	Candidate	Votes	%	±%
Independent	Don Mackay	1,146	48.9	N/A
Conservative	Chris Metcalfe*	704	30.1	−25.2
Labour	Steve Cobb	415	17.7	−18.2
Liberal Democrats	Daniel Khan	77	3.3	N/A
Majority		442	18.8	−0.6
Independent gain from Conservative		Swing		

== By-elections between 2017 and 2022 ==
Knaresborough by-election 16 August 2018 replacing Nicola Wilson (resigned)
Party	Candidate	Votes	%	±%
Liberal Democrats	David Goode	2,051	54.9	+18.6
Conservative	Philip Ireland	1,313	35.2	−5.1
Labour	Sharon-Theresa Calvert	369	9.9	−1.9
Majority		738	19.7	
Liberal Democrats gain from Conservative		Swing		

Upper Dales by-election 17 October 2019 replacing John Blackie (deceased)
Party	Candidate	Votes	%	±%
Conservative	Yvonne Peacock	884	45.7	+16.2
Independent	Jill McMullon	741	38.3	N/A
Liberal Democrats	Simon Crosby	204	10.5	N/A
Green	Kevin Foster	107	5.5	+0.4
Majority		143	7.4	−24.5
Conservative gain from Independent		Swing		

Harrogate Bilton and Nidd Gorge by-election 6 May 2021 replacing Geoff Webber (deceased)
Party	Candidate	Votes	%	±%
Conservative	Matt Scott	1,991	42.6	+14.2
Liberal Democrats	Andrew Kempston-Parkes	1,639	35.1	+1.9
Labour	Tyler Reeton	434	9.3	−6.2
Green	Arnold Warneken	430	9.2	N/A
Yorkshire	John Hall	136	2.9	N/A
Independent	Harvey Alexander	46	1.0	N/A
Majority		352	7.5	
Conservative gain from Liberal Democrats		Swing		

Ribblesdale by-election 6 May 2021 replacing Richard Welch (deceased)
Party	Candidate	Votes	%	±%
Conservative	David Stavely	1,537	54.2	−11.1
Labour	Brian McDaid	475	16.7	−18.0
Liberal Democrats	Luke Allan	430	15.2	N/A
Green	David Noland	395	13.9	N/A
Majority		1,062	37.5	+6.9
Conservative hold		Swing		
