= 2022 North Yorkshire Council election =

2022 North Yorkshire County Council election

- 5 May 2022

All 90 seats to North Yorkshire Council 46 seats needed for a majority

	First party	Second party	Third party
Leader	Carl Les		Eric Broadbent (Note: Broadbent was the prior Labour group leader on North Yorkshire County Council, but did not continue in the role after the election and was replaced by Steve Shaw-Wright.)
Party	Conservative	Independent	Labour
Leader's seat	Catterick Village & Brompton-on-Swale		Northstead
Seats won	47	13	12
Popular vote	69,272	23,207	29,149
Percentage	41.2%	13.8%	17.3%
	Fourth party	Fifth party	Sixth party
Leader	Bryn Griffiths	N/A (Note: The Green Party did not hold any prior representation on North Yorkshire County Council. Kevin Foster was chosen as group leader after the election.)	N/A (Note: The Liberal Party sits in a group with the Liberal Democrats, and does not have its own leader.)
Party	Liberal Democrats	Green	Liberal
Leader's seat	Stokesley
Seats won	12	5	1
Popular vote	26,527	16,497	1,469
Percentage	15.8%	9.8%	0.9%
Council control before election
Conservative
Council control after election
Conservative

The 2022 North Yorkshire Council election took place on 5 May 2022, alongside the other local elections. These were the last elections to North Yorkshire County Council, and the elected councillors would also serve as the first councillors on the North Yorkshire Council (a new unitary authority), which replaced the existing county council in April 2023.

The scheduled 2021 North Yorkshire County Council elections were not held due to the restructure of local government in the county.

The North Yorkshire County Council was led by a Conservative Party majority prior to the election.

== Previous council composition ==
After 2017 election		Before 2022 election	
Party	Seats	Party	Seats
Conservative	55	Conservative	51
Independent	10	Independent	14
Labour	4	Labour	4
Liberal Democrats	3	Liberal Democrats	3

Changes:

- July 2018: Michael Jordan leaves Conservatives to join the Yorkshire Party.
- August 2018: David Goode gains seat for Liberal Democrats from Conservatives in by-election
- July 2019: John Blackie (independent) dies; by-election held October 2019
- October 2019: Yvonne Peacock gains seat for Conservatives from independent in by-election
- October 2019: Andrew Jenkinson leaves Conservatives to sit as an independent
- November 2019: Andrew Backhouse leaves Conservatives to sit as an independent
- August 2020: Michael Jordan returns from the Yorkshire Party to the Conservatives.
- January 2021: Richard Welch (Conservative) dies; by-election held in May 2021
- March 2021: Geoff Weber (Liberal Democrats) dies; by-election held in May 2021
- May 2021: Matt Scott gains seat for Conservatives from Liberal Democrats in by-election, David Staveley retains seat for Conservatives in by-election
- February 2022: Caroline Goodrick leaves Conservatives to sit as an independent
- Val Arnold leaves Conservatives to sit as an independent
- David Hugill leaves Conservatives to sit as an independent

== Results summary ==
The overall results were as follows.

Party	Councillors				Votes		
Party		Of total	Net			Of total	Net
Conservative Party	47	52.2%		47 / 90	69,272	41.2%	
Labour Party	12	13.3%		12 / 90	29,149	17.3%	
Liberal Democrats	12	13.3%		12 / 90	26,527	15.8%	
Independents	13	14.4%		13 / 90	23,207	13.8%	
Green	5	5.6%		5 / 90	16,497	9.8%	
Liberal Party	1	1.1%		1 / 90	1,469	0.9%	
Whitby Area Independents	0	0.0%		0 / 90	1,306	0.8%	
Yorkshire Party	0	0.0%		0 / 90	479	0.3%	
Reform UK	0	0.0%		0 / 90	130	0.1%	
SDP	0	0.0%		0 / 90	64	0.0%	

== Ward results ==
The results for all 90 divisions were published by North Yorkshire Council.

=== Craven area ===
Party	Councillors				Votes		
Party		Of total	Net			Of total	Net
Conservative Party	3	37.5%		3 / 8	5,389	34.4%	
Independents	3	37.5%		3 / 8	3,006	19.2%	
Green	2	25.0%		2 / 8	3,712	23.7%	
Labour Party	0	0.0%		0 / 8	2,353	15.0%	
Liberal Democrats	0	0.0%		0 / 8	1,115	7.1%	
Yorkshire Party	0	0.0%		0 / 8	95	0.6%	

==== Aire Valley ====
Aire Valley (1 seat)
Party	Candidate	Votes	%	±%
Green	Andy Brown	1,602	79.3	
Conservative	Stuart William Handley	419	20.7	
Majority		1183	58.5	
Green win (new seat)				

==== Bentham & Ingleton ====
Bentham & Ingleton (1 seat)
Party	Candidate	Votes	%	±%
Conservative	David Lloyd Ireton	1,149	50.9	▼14.7
Labour	Lewis Gareth Morgan	454	20.1	N/A
Liberal Democrats	John Michael Smithson	367	16.3	N/A
Green	Anne Weinhold	287	12.7	▼21.7
Majority		695	30.8	▼0.4
Conservative win (new seat)				

Changes are shown from 2017 with the identical North Craven division of North Yorkshire County Council.

==== Glusburn, Cross Hills & Sutton-in-Craven ====
Glusburn, Cross Hills & Sutton-in-Craven (1 seat)
Party	Candidate	Votes	%	±%
Independent	Philip Melvin Barrett	1,061	52.6	
Conservative	Andy Micklethwaite	418	20.7	
Labour	Christopher Thorp	340	16.9	
Green	Fran Graham	197	9.8	
Majority		643	31.9	
Independent win (new seat)				

==== Mid Craven ====
Mid Craven (1 seat)
Party	Candidate	Votes	%	±%
Conservative	Simon Martin Myers	992	58.0	
Green	Simon James Watkins	718	42.0	
Majority		274	16.0	
Conservative win (new seat)				

==== Settle & Penyghent ====
Settle & Penyghent (1 seat)
Party	Candidate	Votes	%	±%
Conservative	David Michael Staveley	1,078	55.3	
Labour	Aidan David Higgins	436	22.4	
Liberal Democrats	Luke Robert Allan	434	22.3	
Majority		642	32.9	
Conservative win (new seat)				

==== Skipton East & South ====
Skipton East & South (1 seat)
Party	Candidate	Votes	%	±%
Independent	Robert Geoffrey Heseltine	640	33.6	
Labour	Bryan Anthony Mcdaid	620	32.5	
Conservative	Heather Laura Midwinter	347	18.2	
Independent	Rick Judge	165	8.7	
Liberal Democrats	Kate Ward	134	7.0	
Majority		20	1.1	
Independent win (new seat)				

==== Skipton North & Embsay-with-Eastby ====
Skipton North & Embsay-with-Eastby (1 seat)
Party	Candidate	Votes	%	±%
Green	David Christopher Noland	742	34.7	
Independent	Brian Stuart Shuttleworth	637	29.8	
Conservative	John William Dawson	485	22.7	
Liberal Democrats	Michelle Denise Winthrop	180	8.4	
Yorkshire	Phil Street	95	4.4	
Majority		105	4.9	
Green win (new seat)				

==== Skipton West & West Craven ====
Skipton West & West Craven (1 seat)
Party	Candidate	Votes	%	±%
Independent	Andy Solloway	503^{1}	30.1	
Labour	Peter Geoffrey Madeley	503	30.1	
Conservative	Patrick Thomas Mulligan	501	30.0	
Green	Claire Nash	166	9.8	
Majority		1	0.1	
Independent win (new seat)				

^{1} – Solloway and Madeley were both tied on 503 votes; Solloway won the seat via drawing of lots.

=== Hambleton area ===
Party	Councillors				Votes		
Party		Of total	Net			Of total	Net
Conservative Party	12	85.7%		12 / 14	11,555	48.6%	
Liberal Democrats	1	7.1%		1 / 14	3,460	14.5%	
Green	1	7.1%		1 / 14	2,680	11.3%	
Labour Party	0	0.0%		0 / 14	4,482	18.8%	
Independents	0	0.0%		0 / 14	1,620	6.8%	

==== Aiskew & Leeming ====
Aiskew & Leeming (1 seat)
Party	Candidate	Votes	%	±%
Conservative	John Keith Weighell	679	52.2	
Green	Michael Edwin Chaloner	622	47.8	
Majority		57	4.4	
Conservative win (new seat)				

==== Bedale ====
Bedale (1 seat)
Party	Candidate	Votes	%	±%
Conservative	David Anthony Webster	1,067	63.4	
Green	Elaine Kilroy	329	19.5	
Labour	Lenny Cornwall	288	17.1	
Majority		738	43.8	
Conservative win (new seat)				

==== Easingwold ====
Easingwold (1 seat)
Party	Candidate	Votes	%	±%
Conservative	Nigel Antony Knapton	1,015	52.6	
Labour	Emma Nicole Scott-Spivey	582	30.2	
Liberal Democrats	Barry Michael Doyle	333	17.3	
Majority		433	22.4	
Conservative win (new seat)				

==== Great Ayton ====
Great Ayton (1 seat)
Party	Candidate	Votes	%	±%
Conservative	Heather Moorhouse	990	59.7	
Labour	Mike Newton	364	22.0	
Liberal Democrats	Richard Thomas Short	303	18.3	
Majority		626	37.7	
Conservative win (new seat)				

==== Hillside & Raskelf ====
Hillside & Raskelf (1 seat)
Party	Candidate	Votes	%	±%
Conservative	Alyson Elizabeth Baker	1,050	48.7	
Independent	Andrew Robinson	474	22.0	
Green	Adam Harper	321	14.9	
Labour	Ian Whitehead	313	14.5	
Majority		576	26.7	
Conservative win (new seat)				

==== Huby & Tollerton ====
Huby & Tollerton (1 seat)
Party	Candidate	Votes	%	±%
Conservative	Malcolm Geoffrey Taylor	1,030	54.9	
Labour	Helen Kathleen Tomlinson	492	26.2	
Liberal Democrats	Neil Robert Beckwith	353	18.8	
Majority		538	28.7	
Conservative win (new seat)				

==== Hutton Rudby & Osmotherley ====
Hutton Rudby & Osmotherley (1 seat)
Party	Candidate	Votes	%	±%
Conservative	Bridget Susan Fortune	892	39.5	
Independent	David Hugill	643	28.5	
Liberal Democrats	Duncan Ross Russell	535	23.7	
Labour Co-op	Anne Evelyn Mannix	186	8.2	
Majority		249	11.0	
Conservative win (new seat)				

==== Morton-on-Swale & Appleton Wiske ====
Morton-on-Swale & Appleton Wiske (1 seat)
Party	Candidate	Votes	%	±%
Conservative	Annabel Susan Wilkinson	1,292	66.5	
Labour	Joseph James Body	334	17.2	
Green	John Yorke	317	16.3	
Majority		958	49.3	
Conservative win (new seat)				

==== Northallerton North & Brompton ====
Northallerton North & Brompton (1 seat)
Party	Candidate	Votes	%	±%
Conservative	Steve Watson	616	40.2	
Independent	Paul Anthony Atkin	503	32.8	
Labour	James Richard Grainge	413	27.0	
Majority		113	7.4	
Conservative win (new seat)				

==== Northallerton South ====
Northallerton South (1 seat)
Party	Candidate	Votes	%	±%
Conservative	Caroline Anne Dickinson	751	55.4	
Labour	Gerald Ramsden	436	32.2	
Liberal Democrats	Paul Michael Chapman	168	12.4	
Majority		315	23.2	
Conservative win (new seat)				

==== Romanby ====
Romanby (1 seat)
Party	Candidate	Votes	%	±%
Conservative	Peter Robert Wilkinson	1,035	56.4	
Labour	Joe Sawdon	404	22.0	
Liberal Democrats	Mark William Metcalfe Harrison	397	21.6	
Majority		631	34.4	
Conservative win (new seat)				

==== Sowerby & Topcliffe ====
Sowerby & Topcliffe (1 seat)
Party	Candidate	Votes	%	±%
Green	Dave Whitfield	1,091	51.9	
Conservative	Mark Stewart Robson	1,010	48.1	
Majority		81	3.9	
Green win (new seat)				

==== Stokesley ====
Stokesley (1 seat)
Party	Candidate	Votes	%	±%
Liberal Democrats	Bryn Griffiths	1,202	53.4	
Conservative	Jack William Cooper	826	36.7	
Labour	Geoffrey Keith Marron	225	10.0	
Majority		376	16.7	
Liberal Democrats win (new seat)				

==== Thirsk ====
Thirsk (1 seat)
Party	Candidate	Votes	%	±%
Conservative	Gareth Wedgwood Dadd	1,138	65.0	
Labour	David Harry Seex	445	25.4	
Liberal Democrats	Bill Hoult	169	9.6	
Majority		693	39.6	
Conservative win (new seat)				

=== Harrogate area ===
Party	Councillors				Votes		
Party		Of total	Net			Of total	Net
Liberal Democrats	10	47.6%		10 / 21	16,067	35.4%	
Conservative Party	9	42.9%		9 / 21	17,594	38.7%	
Independents	1	4.8%		1 / 21	4,711	10.4%	
Green	1	4.8%		1 / 21	3,945	8.7%	
Labour Party	0	0.0%		0 / 21	2,908	6.4%	
Yorkshire Party	0	0.0%		0 / 21	223	0.5%	

==== Bilton & Nidd Gorge ====
Bilton & Nidd Gorge (1 seat)
Party	Candidate	Votes	%	±%
Conservative	Paul Haslam	1,017	51.8	
Liberal Democrats	Andrew Graham Kempston-Parkes	663	33.7	
Labour	Deborah Anne Havercroft	285	14.5	
Majority		354	18.0	
Conservative win (new seat)				

==== Bilton Grange & New Park ====
Bilton Grange & New Park (1 seat)
Party	Candidate	Votes	%	±%
Liberal Democrats	Monika Slater	968	50.2	
Conservative	Matt Scott	677	35.1	
Labour	Andrew Morris Zigmond	159	8.3	
Green	Tamsin Jade Worrall	123	6.4	
Majority		291	15.1	
Liberal Democrats win (new seat)				

==== Boroughbridge & Claro ====
Boroughbridge & Claro (1 seat)
Party	Candidate	Votes	%	±%
Conservative	Robert Windass	936	44.2	
Independent	Jon Starkey	486	22.9	
Liberal Democrats	Andy Bell	433	20.4	
Green	Clark Pearson	169	8.0	
Independent	Noel Frank Evans	96	4.5	
Majority		450	21.2	
Conservative win (new seat)				

==== Coppice Valley & Duchy ====
Coppice Valley & Duchy (1 seat)
Party	Candidate	Votes	%	±%
Liberal Democrats	Peter Charles Lacey	940	45.0	
Conservative	Graham Kevin Swift	739	35.4	
Independent	Daniel Jonathan James d’Arcy Thompson	199	9.5	
Labour	Patricia Ann Foxall	126	6.0	
Green	Leighton Regayre	84	4.0	
Majority		201	9.6	
Liberal Democrats win (new seat)				

==== Fairfax & Starbeck ====
Fairfax & Starbeck (1 seat)
Party	Candidate	Votes	%	±%
Liberal Democrats	Philip Anthony Broadbank	921	51.1	
Conservative	Sue Lumby	442	24.5	
Labour	Christopher John Watt	337	18.7	
Green	Gordon Schallmo	103	5.7	
Majority		479	26.6	
Liberal Democrats win (new seat)				

==== Harlow & St. Georges ====
Harlow & St. Georges (1 seat)
Party	Candidate	Votes	%	±%
Liberal Democrats	Mike Schofield	1,245	45.9	
Conservative	Steven Jackson	805	29.7	
Independent	Sarah Jane Hart	345	12.7	
Labour	John Charles Adams	169	6.2	
Green	Andrew Rickard	149	5.5	
Majority		440	16.2	
Liberal Democrats win (new seat)				

==== High Harrogate & Kingsley ====
High Harrogate & Kingsley (1 seat)
Party	Candidate	Votes	%	±%
Liberal Democrats	Chris Aldred	1,019	49.9	
Conservative	Tim Myatt	760	37.2	
Labour	Geoffrey Ronald David Foxall	263	12.9	
Majority		250	12.7	
Liberal Democrats win (new seat)				

==== Killinghall, Hampsthwaite & Saltergate ====
Killinghall, Hampsthwaite & Saltergate (1 seat)
Party	Candidate	Votes	%	±%
Conservative	Michael Harrison	1,016	54.7	
Liberal Democrats	David Ryland Goode	465	25.1	
Labour	Edward Charles Clayson	251	13.5	
Green	Bill Rigby	124	6.7	
Majority		551	29.6	
Conservative win (new seat)				

==== Knaresborough East ====
Knaresborough East (1 seat)
Party	Candidate	Votes	%	±%
Liberal Democrats	Hannah Gostlow	1,169	52.8	
Conservative	Ed Darling	767	34.7	
Labour	Sharon-Theresa Calvert	276	12.5	
Majority		402	18.1	
Liberal Democrats win (new seat)				

==== Knaresborough West ====
Knaresborough West (1 seat)
Party	Candidate	Votes	%	±%
Liberal Democrats	Matt Walker	1,316	50.0	
Conservative	Phil Ireland	988	37.5	
Labour	David Tom Crosthwaite	328	12.5	
Majority		328	12.5	
Liberal Democrats win (new seat)				

==== Masham & Fountains ====
Masham & Fountains (1 seat)
Party	Candidate	Votes	%	±%
Conservative	Margaret Edna Atkinson	1,076	44.2	
Independent	Felicity Cunliffe-Lister	738	30.3	
Liberal Democrats	Judith Mary Hooper	620	25.5	
Majority		338	13.9	
Conservative win (new seat)				

==== Oatlands & Pannal ====
Oatlands & Pannal (1 seat)
Party	Candidate	Votes	%	±%
Conservative	John Mann	1,175	46.8	
Liberal Democrats	Justin James Peter Chan	820	32.7	
Green	Gillian Rosemary Charters	266	10.6	
Labour	Margaret Smith	250	10.0	
Majority		355	14.1	
Conservative win (new seat)				

==== Ouseburn ====
Ouseburn (1 seat)
Party	Candidate	Votes	%	±%
Green	Arnold Francis Warneken	1,328	69.4	
Conservative	Richard Francis Thomas Musgrave	586	30.6	
Majority		742	38.8	
Green win (new seat)				

==== Pateley Bridge & Nidderdale ====
Pateley Bridge & Nidderdale (1 seat)
Party	Candidate	Votes	%	±%
Liberal Democrats	Andrew James Murday	1,002	53.5	
Conservative	Stanley Lumley	807	43.1	
Yorkshire	Alison Harris	65	3.5	
Majority		195	10.4	
Liberal Democrats win (new seat)				

==== Ripon Minster & Moorside ====
Ripon Minster & Moorside (1 seat)
Party	Candidate	Votes	%	±%
Independent	Andrew Williams	1,453	69.2	
Liberal Democrats	Tom Cavell-Taylor	334	15.9	
Conservative	Thomas James Averre	312	14.9	
Majority		1,119	53.3	
Independent win (new seat)				

==== Ripon Ure Bank & Spa ====
Ripon Ure Bank & Spa (1 seat)
Party	Candidate	Votes	%	±%
Liberal Democrats	Barbara Jean Brodigan	985	40.6	
Independent	Sidney James Hawke	734	30.3	
Conservative	Mike Chambers	556	22.9	
Green	Robin John Burgess	151	6.2	
Majority		251	10.3	
Liberal Democrats win (new seat)				

==== Spofforth with Lower Wharfedale & Tockwith ====
Spofforth with Lower Wharfedale & Tockwith (1 seat)
Party	Candidate	Votes	%	±%
Conservative	Andy Paraskos	929	54.1	
Green	Alexandra Graham Marsh	630	36.7	
Yorkshire	John Philip Hall	158	9.2	
Majority		299	17.4	
Conservative win (new seat)				

==== Stray, Woodlands & Hookstone ====
Stray, Woodlands & Hookstone (1 seat)
Party	Candidate	Votes	%	±%
Liberal Democrats	Pat Marsh	1,350	51.6	
Conservative	John Radcliffe Ennis	910	34.8	
Labour	Helen Burke	189	7.2	
Independent	Anna Risanna McIntee	167	6.4	
Majority		440	16.8	
Liberal Democrats win (new seat)				

==== Valley Gardens & Central Harrogate ====
Valley Gardens & Central Harrogate (1 seat)
Party	Candidate	Votes	%	±%
Conservative	Sam Gibbs	871	39.9	
Liberal Democrats	David Johnson	545	25.0	
Independent	Lucy Jayne Gardiner	331	15.2	
Labour	Andrew Williamson	275	12.6	
Green	Paul Ko Ferrigno	162	7.4	
Majority		326	14.9	
Conservative win (new seat)				

==== Washburn & Birstwith ====
Washburn & Birstwith (1 seat)
Party	Candidate	Votes	%	±%
Conservative	Nathan Roger Hull	891	45.3	
Liberal Democrats	Tom Watson	713	36.2	
Green	Paul Geoffrey Trewhitt	201	10.2	
Independent	Ian Roger Galloway	162	8.2	
Majority		178	9.1	
Conservative win (new seat)				

==== Wathvale & Bishop Monkton ====
Wathvale & Bishop Monkton (1 seat)
Party	Candidate	Votes	%	±%
Conservative	Nick Brown	1,334	56.8	
Liberal Democrats	Chris Knight	559	23.8	
Green	Hannah Katherine Gargett Corlett	455	19.4	
Majority		775	33.0	
Conservative win (new seat)				

=== Richmondshire area ===
Party	Councillors				Votes		
Party		Of total	Net			Of total	Net
Conservative Party	5	71.4%		5 / 7	5,622	44.1%	
Independents	1	14.3%		1 / 7	2,985	23.4%	
Green	1	14.3%		1 / 7	1,025	8.0%	
Liberal Democrats	0	0.0%		0 / 7	2,701	21.2%	
Labour Party	0	0.0%		0 / 7	424	3.3%	

==== Catterick Village & Brompton-on-Swale ====
Catterick Village & Brompton-on-Swale (1 seat)
Party	Candidate	Votes	%	±%
Conservative	Carl Anthony Les	760	56.5	
Independent	Leslie Anthony Rowe	417	31.0	
Labour	Mike Hill	169	12.6	
Majority		343	25.5	
Conservative win (new seat)				

==== Hipswell & Colburn ====
Hipswell & Colburn (1 seat)
Party	Candidate	Votes	%	±%
Green	Kevin Foster	559	39.4	
Conservative	Jag Sharma	551	38.9	
Independent	Paul Cullen	309	21.8	
Majority		8	0.6	
Green win (new seat)				

==== Leyburn & Middleham ====
Leyburn & Middleham (1 seat)
Party	Candidate	Votes	%	±%
Conservative	Karin Sedgwick	815	47.0	
Independent	John Ralph Amsden	663	38.3	
Labour Co-op	Thom Kirkwood	255	14.7	
Majority		152	8.7	
Conservative win (new seat)				

==== North Richmondshire ====
North Richmondshire (1 seat)
Party	Candidate	Votes	%	±%
Conservative	Angus Thompson	1,335	53.9	
Liberal Democrats	Jane Elizabeth Parlour	1,140	46.1	
Majority		195	7.8	
Conservative win (new seat)				

==== Richmond ====
Richmond (1 seat)
Party	Candidate	Votes	%	±%
Independent	Stuart Parsons	1,106	44.6	
Liberal Democrats	Philip David Wicks	981	39.6	
Conservative	Jimmy Wilson-Petch	393	15.8	
Majority		125	5.0	
Independent win (new seat)				

==== Scotton & Lower Wensleydale ====
Scotton & Lower Wensleydale (1 seat)
Party	Candidate	Votes	%	±%
Conservative	Tom Jones	643	45.5	
Independent	Helen Grant	490	34.7	
Green	Lisle Robert Dudley Ryder	176	12.5	
Liberal Democrats	David Stephen Dresser	103	7.3	
Majority		153	10.8	
Conservative win (new seat)				

==== Upper Dales ====
Upper Dales (1 seat)
Party	Candidate	Votes	%	±%
Conservative	Yvonne Peacock	1,125	59.5	
Liberal Democrats	Penny Smith	477	25.2	
Green	Margaret Lowndes	290	15.3	
Majority		648	34.2	
Conservative win (new seat)				

=== Ryedale area ===
Party	Councillors				Votes		
Party		Of total	Net			Of total	Net
Conservative Party	4	50.0%		4 / 8	7,175	44.5%	
Independents	2	25.0%		2 / 8	2,659	16.5%	
Liberal Democrats	1	12.5%		1 / 8	1,924	11.9%	
Liberal Party	1	12.5%		1 / 8	1,469	9.1%	
Green	0	0.0%		0 / 8	1,845	11.4%	
Labour Party	0	0.0%		0 / 8	1,014	6.3%	
Yorkshire Party	0	0.0%		0 / 8	50	0.3%	

==== Amotherby & Ampleforth ====
Amotherby & Ampleforth (1 seat)
Party	Candidate	Votes	%	±%
Liberal Democrats	Steven Paul Mason	946	50.9	
Conservative	Jim Bailey	914	49.1	
Majority		32	1.7	
Liberal Democrats win (new seat)				

==== Helmsley & Sinnington ====
Helmsley & Sinnington (1 seat)
Party	Candidate	Votes	%	±%
Conservative	George Jabbour	1,084	54.5	
Independent	Val Arnold	371	18.7	
Independent	Simon Noel Roy Thackray	189	9.5	
Green	Barbara Jane Hickman	186	9.4	
Liberal Democrats	Mary Alexandra Young	159	8.0	
Majority		713	35.8	
Conservative win (new seat)				

==== Kirkbymoorside & Dales ====
Kirkbymoorside & Dales (1 seat)
Party	Candidate	Votes	%	±%
Conservative	Greg White	724	30.8	
Green	Richard George McLane	549	23.3	
Independent	Janet Frank	409	17.4	
Labour	Jill Louise Wells	254	10.8	
Liberal	Alasdair Iain Clark	221	9.4	
Independent	Tony Riby	195	8.3	
Majority		175	7.5	
Conservative win (new seat)				

==== Malton ====
Malton (1 seat)
Party	Candidate	Votes	%	±%
Independent	Lindsay Marie Burr	765	52.1	
Conservative	Fabia Celestine Tate	432	29.4	
Labour	Samson Musyoka Kitula Meteke	270	18.4	
Majority		333	22.7	
Independent win (new seat)				

==== Norton ====
Norton (1 seat)
Party	Candidate	Votes	%	±%
Conservative	Keane Charles Duncan	1,416	63.4	
Liberal Democrats	Di Keal	819	36.6	
Majority		597	26.8	
Conservative win (new seat)				

==== Pickering ====
Pickering (1 seat)
Party	Candidate	Votes	%	±%
Liberal	Joy Andrews	804	39.3	
Conservative	Paul Littlewood	756	37.0	
Labour	Alan Philip Avery	248	12.1	
Green	Edward Whittle	187	9.1	
Yorkshire	George William Mueller-Waite	50	2.4	
Majority		48	2.3	
Liberal win (new seat)				

==== Sheriff Hutton & Derwent ====
Sheriff Hutton & Derwent (1 seat)
Party	Candidate	Votes	%	±%
Independent	Caroline Grant Goodrick	730	35.6	
Conservative	Claire Docwra	723	35.2	
Green	Ian Conlon	599	29.2	
Majority		7	0.4	
Independent win (new seat)				

==== Thornton Dale & Wolds ====
Thornton Dale & Wolds (1 seat)
Party	Candidate	Votes	%	±%
Conservative	Janet Elaine Sanderson	1,126	52.7	
Liberal	Clive Miller Wass	444	20.8	
Green	Josie Downs	324	15.2	
Labour Co-op	Mick Johnston	242	11.3	
Majority		682	31.9	
Conservative win (new seat)				

=== Scarborough area ===
Party	Councillors				Votes		
Party		Of total	Net			Of total	Net
Conservative Party	8	44.4%		8 / 18	9,916	35.3%	
Labour Party	7	38.9%		7 / 18	8,615	30.6%	
Independents	3	16.7%		3 / 18	4,855	17.3%	
Green	0	0.0%		0 / 18	1,857	6.6%	
Whitby Area Independents	0	0.0%		0 / 18	1,306	4.6%	
Liberal Democrats	0	0.0%		0 / 18	1,260	4.5%	
Reform UK	0	0.0%		0 / 18	130	0.5%	
Yorkshire Party	0	0.0%		0 / 18	111	0.4%	
SDP	0	0.0%		0 / 18	64	0.2%	

==== Castle ====
Castle (1 seat)
Party	Candidate	Votes	%	±%
Independent	Janet Helen Jefferson	526	41.3	
Labour Co-op	Colin Robert Challen	453	35.6	
Conservative	Geoffrey Lambert	113	8.9	
Independent	Guy William Leslie Smith	113	8.9	
Green	David Edmund King	68	5.3	
Majority		73	5.7	
Independent win (new seat)				

==== Cayton ====
Cayton (1 seat)
Party	Candidate	Votes	%	±%
Conservative	Roberta Florence Swiers	603	50.9	
Labour	Tina Marie Davy	322	27.2	
Reform	Robert Everall	130	11.0	
Green	Lynda Powell	129	10.9	
Majority		281	23.7	
Conservative win (new seat)				

==== Danby & Mulgrave ====
Danby & Mulgrave (1 seat)
Party	Candidate	Votes	%	±%
Conservative	David Arthur Chance	668	48.5	
Labour	Peter Alexander Bolton	360	26.2	
Green	Annette Hudspeth	183	13.3	
Whitby Area Independents	Hero Katherine Sumner	165	12.0	
Majority		338	22.3	
Conservative win (new seat)				

==== Derwent Valley & Moor ====
Derwent Valley & Moor (1 seat)
Party	Candidate	Votes	%	±%
Conservative	David Colin Jeffels	740	48.1	
Liberal Democrats	Robert Graham Lockwood	505	32.8	
Labour	Moria Cunningham	231	15.0	
SDP	Kathy Bushell	64	4.2	
Majority		235	15.3	
Conservative win (new seat)				

==== Eastfield ====
Eastfield (1 seat)
Party	Candidate	Votes	%	±%
Labour	Tony Randerson	703	73.3	
Conservative	Tracey Reeves	215	22.4	
Green	Cameron Powell Bairstow	41	4.3	
Majority		488	50.9	
Labour win (new seat)				

==== Esk Valley & Coast ====
Esk Valley & Coast (1 seat)
Party	Candidate	Votes	%	±%
Conservative	Clive Graham Pearson	909	45.0	
Labour	Gerald Alick James Dennett	571	28.3	
Whitby Area Independents	Chris Riddolls	444	22.0	
Liberal Democrats	Craig Michael Stimson	94	4.7	
Majority		338	16.7	
Conservative win (new seat)				

==== Falsgrave & Stepney ====
Falsgrave & Stepney (1 seat)
Party	Candidate	Votes	%	±%
Labour Co-op	Liz Colling	857	50.1	
Green	Nicola Elson	454	26.6	
Conservative	Mark Phillips	398	23.3	
Majority		403	23.5	
Labour win (new seat)				

==== Filey ====
Filey (1 seat)
Party	Candidate	Votes	%	±%
Independent	Sam Cross	809	43.3	
Conservative	Helen Gall Swiers	661	35.3	
Labour	Graham William Scott	400	21.4	
Majority		148	8.0	
Independent win (new seat)				

==== Hunmanby & Sherburn ====
Hunmanby & Sherburn (1 seat)
Party	Candidate	Votes	%	±%
Independent	Michelle Ellen Donohue-Moncrieff	790	46.4	
Conservative	Sue Graham	584	34.3	
Labour	Neil Maxwell Price	327	19.2	
Majority		206	12.1	
Independent win (new seat)				

==== Newby ====
Newby (1 seat)
Party	Candidate	Votes	%	±%
Labour	Subash Chunder Sharma	589	38.1	
Independent	Norman Kenneth Murphy	441	28.6	
Conservative	Charlie Allanson	383	24.8	
Green	Sara West Fenander	102	6.6	
Independent	Vanda Lee Inman	29	1.9	
Majority		148	9.5	
Labour win (new seat)				

==== Northstead ====
Northstead (1 seat)
Party	Candidate	Votes	%	±%
Labour	Eric Broadbent	661	42.4	
Independent	John Eden Atkinson	459	29.4	
Conservative	Bonnie Purchon	329	21.1	
Green	Gabrielle Carol Mary Naptali	111	7.1	
Majority		202	13.0	
Labour win (new seat)				

==== Scalby & the Coast ====
Scalby & the Coast (1 seat)
Party	Candidate	Votes	%	±%
Conservative	Derek James Bastiman	755	38.5	
Independent	Graham Andrew Backhouse	492	25.1	
Labour	Denise Ann Sangster	381	19.4	
Liberal Democrats	Deborah Helen Bore	230	11.7	
Independent	Des Langmead	103	5.3	
Majority		263	13.4	
Conservative win (new seat)				

==== Seamer ====
Seamer (1 seat)
Party	Candidate	Votes	%	±%
Conservative	Heather Phillips	479	43.9	
Labour	Louise Sheila Spivey	269	24.7	
Independent	Roxanne Kate Murphy	206	18.9	
Liberal Democrats	Bob Jackman	136	12.5	
Majority		210	19.2	
Conservative win (new seat)				

==== Weaponness & Ramshill ====
Weaponness & Ramshill (1 seat)
Party	Candidate	Votes	%	±%
Labour	Rich Maw	802	38.0	
Conservative	Eric Batts	653	30.9	
Independent	Jim Grieve	335	15.9	
Green	Charlotte Lucinda Bonner	321	15.2	
Majority		149	7.1	
Labour win (new seat)				

==== Wharfedale ====
Wharfedale (1 seat)
Party	Candidate	Votes	%	±%
Conservative	Richard William Foster	1,164	61.0	
Green	Tony Serjeant	311	16.3	
Labour	Chris Rose	279	14.6	
Liberal Democrats	Siân Elizabeth Wheal	153	8.0	
Majority		853	44.7	
Conservative win (new seat)				

==== Whitby Streonshalh ====
Whitby Streonshalh (1 seat)
Party	Candidate	Votes	%	±%
Labour	Neil Russell Swannick	398	33.8	
Whitby Area Independents	Sandra Mary Turner	317	26.9	
Conservative	Guy Coulson	304	25.8	
Independent	Linda Diane Wild	95	8.1	
Liberal Democrats	Jonathan Graham Harston	65	5.5	
Majority		81	6.9	
Labour win (new seat)				

==== Whitby West ====
Whitby West (1 seat)
Party	Candidate	Votes	%	±%
Conservative	Phil Trumper	721	41.0	
Labour	Asa Joe Benjamin Jones	470	26.7	
Whitby Area Independent	Glen Goodberry	380	21.6	
Yorkshire	Lee Francis Derrick	111	6.3	
Liberal Democrats	Matthew Simon Brown	77	4.4	
Majority		251	14.3	
Conservative win (new seat)				

==== Woodlands ====
Woodlands (1 seat)
Party	Candidate	Votes	%	±%
Labour Co-op	John Ritchie	542	39.5	
Independent	Bill Chatt	457	33.3	
Conservative	John White	237	17.3	
Green	Chris Phillips	137	10.0	
Majority		85	6.2	
Labour Co-op win (new seat)				

=== Selby area ===
Party	Councillors				Votes		
Party		Of total	Net			Of total	Net
Conservative Party	6	42.9%		6 / 14	9,526	41.9%	
Labour Party	5	35.7%		5 / 14	8,415	37.0%	
Independents	3	21.4%		3 / 14	3,371	14.8%	
Green	0	0.0%		0 / 14	1,433	6.3%	

==== Appleton Roebuck & Church Fenton ====
Appleton Roebuck & Church Fenton (1 seat)
Party	Candidate	Votes	%	±%
Conservative	Andrew Lee	903	52.6	
Labour	Emily Kate Pownall	575	33.5	
Green	Barry John Jones	240	14.0	
Majority		326	19.0	
Conservative win (new seat)				

==== Barlby & Riccall ====
Barlby & Riccall (1 seat)
Party	Candidate	Votes	%	±%
Labour	Stephanie Annette Duckett	797	54.4	
Conservative	Charles Richardson	668	45.6	
Majority		129	8.8	
Labour win (new seat)				

==== Brayton & Barlow ====
Brayton & Barlow (1 seat)
Party	Candidate	Votes	%	±%
Conservative	Mark John Crane	937	57.2	
Labour	Craig Laskey	701	42.8	
Majority		236	14.4	
Conservative win (new seat)				

==== Camblesforth & Carlton ====
Camblesforth & Carlton (1 seat)
Party	Candidate	Votes	%	±%
Conservative	Mike Jordan	839	58.6	▼7.8
Labour	John Michael Duggan	593	41.4	▲18.6
Majority		246	17.2	
Conservative win (new seat)				

Changes are shown from the 2021 by-election to the identical Camblesforth & Carlton ward of Selby District Council.

==== Cawood & Escrick ====
Cawood & Escrick (1 seat)
Party	Candidate	Votes	%	±%
Independent	John Cattanach	903	47.8	
Labour Co-op	Rich Harrison	524	27.7	
Conservative	Georgina Ashton	462	24.5	
Majority		379	20.1	
Independent win (new seat)				

==== Cliffe & North Duffield ====
Cliffe & North Duffield (1 seat)
Party	Candidate	Votes	%	±%
Conservative	Karl Vincent Arthur	731	55.2	
Labour	Susannah Goodridge	593	44.8	
Majority		138	10.4	
Conservative win (new seat)				

==== Monk Fryston & South Milford ====
Monk Fryston & South Milford (1 seat)
Party	Candidate	Votes	%	±%
Conservative	Tim Grogan	1,252	53.6	
Labour	Matt Burton	847	36.3	
Green	Cherry Elizabeth Waters	237	10.1	
Majority		405	17.3	
Conservative win (new seat)				

==== Osgoldcross ====
Osgoldcross (1 seat)
Party	Candidate	Votes	%	±%
Independent	John McCartney	1,066	66.4	
Conservative	Conor James Dickinson	323	20.1	
Labour	Eric Walter Beechey	217	13.5	
Majority		743	46.3	
Independent win (new seat)				

==== Selby East ====
Selby East (1 seat)
Party	Candidate	Votes	%	±%
Labour	Jack James Proud	636	53.7	
Conservative	David Buckle	379	32.0	
Green	Thomas Edward Beharrell	170	14.3	
Majority		257	21.7	
Labour win (new seat)				

==== Selby West ====
Selby West (2 seats)
Party	Candidate	Votes	%	±%
Labour	Melanie Ann Davis	1,031	56.4	
Labour	Steve Shaw-Wright	938	51.3	
Conservative	Judith Ann Chilvers	678	37.1	
Conservative	Chris Pearson	659	36.1	
Green	Carol Crutchley	350	19.1	
Majority				
Labour win (new seat)				
Labour win (new seat)				

==== Sherburn in Elmet ====
Sherburn in Elmet (1 seat)
Party	Candidate	Votes	%	±%
Labour	Bob Packham	891	45.6	
Conservative	Alex Tant-Brown	721	36.9	
Green	Peter Michael James Baumann	340	17.4	
Majority		170	8.7	
Labour win (new seat)				

==== Tadcaster ====
Tadcaster (1 seat)
Party	Candidate	Votes	%	±%
Independent	Kirsty Leanne Poskitt	868	35.1	
Conservative	Richard Hartley Sweeting	695	28.1	
Independent	Don Mackay	534	21.6	
Labour	David John Bowgett	279	11.3	
Green	Sarah Jane Baumann	96	3.9	
Majority		173	7.0	
Independent win (new seat)				

==== Thorpe Willoughby & Hambleton ====
Thorpe Willoughby & Hambleton (1 seat)
Party	Candidate	Votes	%	±%
Conservative	Cliff Lunn	938	56.2	
Labour	Tracey Woods	731	43.8	
Majority		207	12.4	
Conservative win (new seat)				

== Changes 2022–2027 ==
- In June 2023, Mike Jordan, elected as a Conservative, left the party to contest the 2023 Selby and Ainsty by-election as an independent candidate. The change left the council under no overall control. By April 2024, he had joined Reform UK.
- Also in June 2023, Mike Schofield, elected as a Liberal Democrat, left the party to sit as an independent. He joined the Green Party in December 2025.
- In March 2024, Paul Haslam, elected as a Conservative, left the party to contest the 2024 York and North Yorkshire mayoral election as an independent candidate.
- In May 2024, Rich Maw, elected for Labour, left the party to sit as an independent.
- In October 2025, Karl Arthur, elected as a Conservative, joined Reform UK.
- In November 2025, John Mann, elected as a Conservative, left the party to sit as an independent. The change deprived the Conservative and Independents group of its council majority. Mann joined Reform UK in March 2026.
- In May 2026, Tim Grogan, elected as a Conservative, joined Reform UK.

=== By-elections ===
==== Masham & Fountains ====
Masham & Fountains by-election, 9 February 2023
Party	Candidate	Votes	%	±%
Liberal Democrats	Felicity Cunliffe-Lister	1,349	62.7	+37.2
Conservative	Brooke Hull	801	37.3	−6.9
Majority		548	25.4	N/A
Turnout		2,150	35.5	
Liberal Democrats gain from Conservative		Swing	+22.0	

The by-election followed the death of Conservative councillor Margaret Atkinson.

==== Eastfield ====
Eastfield by-election, 25 May 2023
Party	Candidate	Votes	%	±%
Independent	Tony Randerson	499	46.4	New
Liberal Democrats	Erica Willett	281	26.1	New
Labour	David Thompson	169	15.7	−57.6
Conservative	Eric Batts	69	6.4	−16.0
Independent	Tim Thorne	39	3.6	New
Green	Will Forbes	19	1.8	−2.5
Majority		218	20.3	N/A
Turnout		1,076	22.1	
Independent gain from Labour		Swing	N/A	

The by-election followed the resignation of Labour councillor Tony Randerson, who stood for re-election. Randerson was a candidate of the Social Justice Party, but was listed as an independent on the ballot paper because the party had not been registered with the Electoral Commission. The party was formally registered in February 2024.

==== Hutton Rudby & Osmotherley ====
Hutton Rudby & Osmotherley by-election, 28 September 2023
Party	Candidate	Votes	%	±%
Conservative	David Hugill	954	48.4	+8.9
Liberal Democrats	Duncan Ross Russell	747	37.9	+14.2
Green	Allan Mortimer	243	12.3	New
Yorkshire	Lee Derrick	27	1.4	New
Majority		207	10.5	−0.5
Turnout		1,971	38.9	
Conservative hold		Swing	-2.6	

The by-election followed the resignation of Conservative councillor Bridget Fortune on 17 July 2023. Joseph Body was nominated by the Labour Party but withdrew before the close of nominations.

==== Sowerby & Topcliffe ====
Sowerby & Topcliffe by-election, 30 November 2023
Party	Candidate	Votes	%	±%
Liberal Democrats	Dan Sladden	764	41.6	New
Conservative	Dave Elders	460	25.1	−23.0
Green	John Law	306	16.7	−35.2
Labour	Helen Tomlinson	250	13.6	New
Yorkshire	John Hall	35	1.9	New
Monster Raving Loony	Stew Exotic	20	1.1	New
Majority		304	16.5	N/A
Turnout		1,835	29.3	
Liberal Democrats gain from Green		Swing	N/A	

The by-election followed the resignation of Green councillor Dave Whitfield.

==== Stray, Woodlands & Hookstone ====
Stray, Woodlands & Hookstone by-election, 11 April 2024
Party	Candidate	Votes	%	±%
Liberal Democrats	Andrew Timothy	1,094	43.8	−7.8
Conservative	John Ennis	768	30.8	−4.0
Green	Gilly Charters	376	15.0	New
Reform	Jonathan Swales	141	5.6	New
Labour	Geoff Foxall	116	4.6	−2.6
Majority		326	13.1	−3.7
Turnout		2,495	41.2	
Liberal Democrats hold		Swing		

The by-election followed the resignation of Pat Marsh, who had been expelled from the Liberal Democrat group earlier that month over social-media comments about the Gaza war.

==== Eastfield ====
Eastfield by-election, 19 June 2025
Party	Candidate	Votes	%	±%
Reform	Tom Seston	538	62.7	New
Labour	Hazel Smith	121	14.1	−1.6
Social Justice Party	Helen Williams	118	13.8	N/A
Conservative	Helen Baker	40	4.7	−1.7
Liberal Democrats	Mark Harrison	24	2.8	−23.3
Green	Kieran Wade	17	2.0	+0.2
Majority		417	48.6	N/A
Turnout		858	16.6	
Reform gain from Social Justice Party		Swing	N/A	

The by-election followed Tony Randerson's resignation on 1 May 2025.

== Current council composition ==
As of 22 July 2026, the council's composition was as follows. Party membership did not correspond exactly to the council's political groups: the Conservative administration included three independent councillors and therefore comprised 44 members.

Party	Seats
Conservative	41
Independent	15
Liberal Democrats	13
Labour	10
Green	5
Reform	5
Liberal	1
