= 2013 North Yorkshire County Council election =

2013 UK local government election

← 2009	2 May 2013	2017 →

All 72 seats to North Yorkshire County Council 37 seats needed for a majority
	First party	Second party	Third party
Leader	John Weighell	Bill Hoult
Party	Conservative	Liberal Democrats	Independent
Leader's seat	Bedale	Knaresborough
Seats won	45	8	8
Seat change	▼3	▼3	▼4
	Fourth party	Fifth party
Leader	Brian Marshall	N/A (Note: UKIP did not hold any prior representation on the council. Sam Cross became group leader following the election.)
Party	Labour	UKIP
Leader's seat	Selby Barlby
Seats won	7	2
Seat change	▲6	▲2
- Map showing the results of the 2013 North Yorkshire County Council election. Striped divisions have mixed representation.
Council control before election
Conservative
Council control after election
Conservative

An election to North Yorkshire County Council took place on 2 May 2013 as part of the 2013 United Kingdom local elections. 72 councillors were elected from 68 electoral divisions, which returned either one or two county councillors each by first-past-the-post voting for a four-year term of office. The four divisions which elected two members were Harrogate Bilton & Nidd Gorge, Harrogate Central, Knaresborough, and Selby Barlby. Of those seats UKIP won its first ever seats on the council in Bilton and Nidd Gorge. The electoral divisions were the same as those used at the previous election in 2009. The election saw the Conservative Party maintain overall control of the council.

All locally registered electors (British, Irish, Commonwealth and European Union citizens) who were aged 18 or over on Thursday 2 May 2013 were entitled to vote in the local elections. Those who were temporarily away from their ordinary address (for example, away working, on holiday, in student accommodation or in hospital) were also entitled to vote in the local elections, although those who had moved abroad and registered as overseas electors cannot vote in the local elections. It is possible to register to vote at more than one address (such as a university student who had a term-time address and lives at home during holidays) at the discretion of the local Electoral Register Office, but it remains an offence to vote more than once in the same local government election.

== Results ==
North Yorkshire County Council election, 2013
Party	Seats	Gains	Losses	Net gain/loss	Seats %	Votes %	Votes	+/−
Conservative	45			-3	62.5	40.6	64,273	
Liberal Democrats	8			-3	11.1	11.4	17,997	
Labour	7			+6	9.7	16.5	26,094	
UKIP	2	2	0	+2	2.7	16.0	25,358	
Independent	8			-4	11.1	11.5	18,196	
Liberal	2	1	0	+1	2.7	1.4	2,287	
Green	0	0	0	0	0.0	2.7	4,228	
National Front	0	0	0	0	0.0	0.0	9	

== Divisional results ==
=== Craven district ===
Airedale
Party	Candidate	Votes	%	±%
Conservative	Patrick Mulligan*	1,096	59.9	+12.2
Labour	Graeme Hitchen	381	20.8	+10.0
Liberal Democrats	Mark Wheeler	353	19.3	−22.2
Majority		715	39.1	+32.9
Turnout		1,830	28.8	
Conservative hold		Swing	+1.1	

Mid-Craven
Party	Candidate	Votes	%	±%
Conservative	Shelagh Marshall*	1,445	57.0	−4.3
Independent	Chris Beazley	676	26.6	N/A
Labour	Jim Black	226	8.9	+0.8
Green	David Noland	190	7.5	N/A
Majority		769	30.4	−14.7
Turnout		2,537	36.3	
Conservative hold		Swing	-15.5	

North Craven
Party	Candidate	Votes	%	±%
Conservative	David Ireton*	1,117	55.4	−24.9
Independent	Tony Macaulay	466	23.1	N/A
Labour	John Matthew	308	15.3	−4.4
Liberal Democrats	Pascal Jacquemain	124	6.2	N/A
Majority		651	32.3	−28.3
Turnout		2,015	32.7	
Conservative hold		Swing	-24.0	

Ribblesdale
Party	Candidate	Votes	%	±%
Conservative	Richard Welch*	997	45.6	−8.2
Independent	Chris Moorby	883	40.4	N/A
Labour	Christine Rose	308	14.1	+4.4
Majority		114	5.2	−12.1
Turnout		2,188	35.0	
Conservative hold		Swing	-24.3	

Skipton East
Party	Candidate	Votes	%	±%
Independent	Robert Heseltine*	1,194	54.1	+7.6
Conservative	James Stafford	329	14.9	−11.3
Liberal Democrats	Eric Jaquin	292	13.2	+3.1
Labour	Duncan Hall	243	11.0	+3.0
Green	Claire Nash	149	6.8	N/A
Majority		865	39.2	+18.9
Turnout		2,207	31.6	
Independent hold		Swing	+9.5	

Skipton West
Party	Candidate	Votes	%	±%
Liberal Democrats	Polly English*	572	28.7	−12.1
Independent	Andy Solloway	471	23.6	N/A
Conservative	Paul Whitaker	407	20.4	−16.9
Green	Fiona Protheroe	312	15.6	N/A
Labour	Peter Madeley	234	11.7	+0.1
Majority		101	5.1	+1.6
Turnout		1,996	33.5%	
Liberal Democrats hold		Swing	-17.9	

South Craven
Party	Candidate	Votes	%	±%
Independent	Philip Barrett*	1,133	63.5	−6.7
UKIP	Roger Baxandall	508	28.5	+15.2
Labour	Birdie Reeves	144	8.1	+4.1
Majority		625	35.0	−20.7
Turnout		1,785	29.3	
Independent hold		Swing	-11.0	

=== Hambleton district ===
Bedale
Party	Candidate	Votes	%	±%
Conservative	John Weighell*	1,204	52.8	−3.7
Independent	Ian Watkins	466	20.4	−16.8
UKIP	Graham Cullen	437	19.2	N/A
Labour	Pam King	172	7.5	+1.2
Majority		738	32.4	+13.1
Turnout		2,279	34.3	
Conservative hold		Swing	+6.6	

Easingwold
Party	Candidate	Votes	%	±%
Conservative	Peter Sowray*	1,327	71.2	+5.7
Labour	Kathleen Mullen	538	28.8	+19.4
Majority		789	42.4	+2.0
Turnout		1,865	26.8	
Conservative hold		Swing	-6.9	

Great Ayton
Party	Candidate	Votes	%	±%
Conservative	Heather Moorhouse*	1,059	52.0	−7.4
UKIP	Stuart Lightwing	538	26.4	N/A
Labour	Paul Spellman	274	13.5	+7.3
Liberal Democrats	Richard Short	165	8.1	−19.0
Majority		521	25.6	−6.7
Turnout		2,036	37.3	
Conservative hold		Swing	-16.7	

North Hambleton
Party	Candidate	Votes	%	±%
Conservative	Tim Swales*	1,257	64.6	−6.1
UKIP	Harry Burton	402	20.7	N/A
Labour	Mike Newton	286	14.7	+6.0
Majority		855	43.9	−6.2
Turnout		1,945	32.4	
Conservative hold		Swing	-13.4	

Northallerton
Party	Candidate	Votes	%	±%
Conservative	Tony Hall*	825	52.4	−21.0
UKIP	Claire Palmer	489	31.1	N/A
Labour	Gerry Ramsden	259	16.5	−10.1
Majority		336	21.3	−25.5
Turnout		1,573	24.9	
Conservative hold		Swing	-26.1	

Romanby and Broomfield
Party	Candidate	Votes	%	±%
Conservative	David Blades*	1,155	54.3	−10.4
UKIP	Joseph Warfield	530	24.9	N/A
Labour	Ann Hutchings	441	20.7	+6.4
Majority		625	29.4	−14.3
Turnout		2,126	31.1	
Conservative hold		Swing	-17.7	

Sowerby
Party	Candidate	Votes	%	±%
Conservative	Bob Baker	1,031	59.1	+3.8
Labour	Kate Fox	406	23.3	+5.6
Green	Steve Hunter	307	17.6	N/A
Majority		625	37.8	+2.0
Turnout		1,744	26.9	
Conservative hold		Swing	-0.8	

Stillington
Party	Candidate	Votes	%	±%
Conservative	Caroline Patmore*	1,331	66.9	−0.9
Green	Jonathan Tulloch	347	17.4	N/A
Labour	Ewan Sommerville	311	15.6	+5.5
Majority		984	49.5	−2.2
Turnout		1,989	29.6	
Conservative hold		Swing	-9.2	

Stokesley
Party	Candidate	Votes	%	±%
Liberal Democrats	Bryn Griffiths*	832	34.1	−19.3
Conservative	Stephen Dickins	757	31.1	−10.6
UKIP	David Troughton	427	17.5	N/A
Labour	Eileen Driver	421	17.3	+12.4
Majority		75	3.0	−8.7
Turnout		2,437	40.5	
Liberal Democrats hold		Swing	-4.4	

Swale
Party	Candidate	Votes	%	±%
Conservative	Arthur Barker*	1,260	62.4	−11.2
UKIP	Jacqueline Brakenberry	501	24.8	N/A
Labour	Lenny Cornwall	259	12.8	+4.9
Majority		759	37.6	−17.5
Turnout		2,020	31.8	
Conservative hold		Swing	-18.0	

Thirsk
Party	Candidate	Votes	%	±%
Conservative	Gareth Dadd*	1,673	84.0	+2.9
Labour	Jude Thurlow	319	16.0	N/A
Majority		1,354	68.0	+5.8
Turnout		1,992	31.3	
Conservative hold		Swing	-9.5	

=== Harrogate district ===
Ainsty
Party	Candidate	Votes	%	±%
Liberal	John Savage*	989	37.7	N/A
Conservative	Famida Wilson	897	34.2	−38.2
UKIP	Robert Frendt	480	18.3	N/A
Labour	John Fisher	258	9.8	+2.1
Majority		92	3.5	−49.0
Turnout		2,624	36.4	
Liberal gain from Conservative		Swing	+38.0	

Cllr John Savage was the Incumbent Councillor, however left the Conservative Party in 2010, before then joining the Liberal Party. Savage's vote share change is shown with that of the Liberal Party in the last election, who did not stand in said election.

Boroughbridge
Party	Candidate	Votes	%	±%
Conservative	Robert Windass	1,220	47.7	−14.5
UKIP	Paul Hudson	759	29.7	N/A
Liberal	Peter Philips	337	13.2	N/A
Labour	Alec Hendry	242	9.5	+4.0
Majority		461	18.0	−11.9
Turnout		2,558	34.2	
Conservative hold		Swing	-22.1	

Harrogate Bilton and Nidd Gorge (2)
Party	Candidate	Votes	%	±%
UKIP	David Simister	1,164	28.9	N/A
Liberal Democrats	Andrew Goss*	1,145	28.5	−17.0
Liberal Democrats	Geoff Webber*	1,112		
UKIP	Mark Simpson	875		
Conservative	Steven Jackson	747	18.6	−15.3
Conservative	Graham Swift	690		
Labour	Andrew Gray	642	16.0	+6.5
Labour	Brian Summerson	542		
Green	Claire Hawkins	326	8.1	N/A
Majority				
Turnout		7,243	56.8	
UKIP gain from Liberal Democrats		Swing	-23.0	
Liberal Democrats hold		Swing	-23.0	

Harrogate Central (2)
Party	Candidate	Votes	%	±%
Conservative	Richard Cooper	1,586	37.9	−6.1
Conservative	Jean Butterball	1,551		
Liberal Democrats	John Fox*	1,539	36.8	−13.0
Liberal Democrats	James Monaghan	1,330		
UKIP	Adrian Ludbrook	657	15.7	N/A
UKIP	Gregory Peters	634		
Labour	Diane Maguire	398	9.5	+3.3
Labour	Nicholas Knott	360		
Majority				
Turnout		8,055	59.0	
Conservative gain from Liberal Democrats		Swing	+3.5	
Conservative gain from Liberal Democrats		Swing	+3.5	

Harrogate Harlow
Party	Candidate	Votes	%	±%
Conservative	Jim Clark*	1,300	51.6	−9.4
Liberal Democrats	Les Parkes	606	24.1	−14.7
UKIP	Salvina Bashforth	413	16.4	N/A
Labour	Kevin McNerney	200	7.9	+4.7
Majority		694	27.5	+2.3
Turnout		2,519	37.7	
Conservative hold		Swing	+2.7	

Harrogate Oatlands
Party	Candidate	Votes	%	±%
Conservative	John Ennis	1,083	40.0	−5.8
Liberal Democrats	Peter Skardon	988	36.5	−14.3
UKIP	Geoffrey Lumley	432	15.9	N/A
Labour	Helen Burke	207	7.6	+4.2
Majority				
Turnout			41	
Conservative gain from Liberal Democrats		Swing		

Harrogate Saltergate
Party	Candidate	Votes	%	±%
Conservative	Don Mackenzie	1050	50	
UKIP	David Thompson	404	19	
Liberal Democrats	Gordon Charlton	326	16	
Labour	Janet Isabella	165	8	
Green	Shaun Lowry	158	8	
Rejected ballots				
Majority				
Turnout			32	
Conservative hold		Swing		

Harrogate Starbeck
Party	Candidate	Votes	%	±%
Liberal Democrats	Margaret-Ann De Courcey-Bayley	908	49	
UKIP	Steven O'Neill	403	22	
Conservative	Benjamin Johnson	310	17	
Labour	Geoffrey Foxall	214	12	
Rejected ballots				
Majority				
Turnout			28	
Liberal Democrats hold		Swing		

Knaresborough (2)
Party	Candidate	Votes	%	±%
Liberal Democrats	Bill Hoult	2084	23	
Liberal Democrats	Anne Jones	1861	20	
Conservative	John Batt	1219	13	
Conservative	Phil Ireland	1108	12	
UKIP	Matthew Joy	947	10	
UKIP	David Rimington	764	8	
Labour	Lorraine Ferris	399	4	
Labour	Jan Williams	376	4	
Green	Gillian Charters	330	4	
Rejected ballots				
Majority				
Turnout			37	
Liberal Democrats hold		Swing		
Liberal Democrats gain from Conservative		Swing		

Lower Nidderdale and Bishop Monkton
Party	Candidate	Votes	%	±%
Conservative				
Liberal Democrats				
UKIP				
Labour				
Rejected ballots				
Majority				
Turnout				
gain from		Swing		

Masham and Fountains
Party	Candidate	Votes	%	±%
Conservative				
UKIP				
Liberal Democrats				
Labour				
Rejected ballots				
Majority				
Turnout				
gain from		Swing		

Pannal and Lower Wharfedale
Party	Candidate	Votes	%	±%
Conservative				
Liberal Democrats				
Labour				
UKIP				
Rejected ballots				
Majority				
Turnout				
gain from		Swing		

Pateley Bridge
Party	Candidate	Votes	%	±%
Conservative				
Liberal Democrats				
UKIP				
Labour				
Rejected ballots				
Majority				
Turnout				
gain from		Swing		

Ripon North
Party	Candidate	Votes	%	±%
Conservative				
Liberal Democrats				
UKIP				
Labour				
Rejected ballots				
Majority				
Turnout				
gain from		Swing		

Ripon South
Party	Candidate	Votes	%	±%
Conservative				
UKIP				
Liberal Democrats				
Labour				
Rejected ballots				
Majority				
Turnout				
gain from		Swing		

=== Richmondshire district ===
Catterick Bridge
Party	Candidate	Votes	%	±%
Conservative				
Liberal Democrats				
Labour				
UKIP				
Rejected ballots				
Majority				
Turnout				
gain from		Swing		

Central Richmondshire
Party	Candidate	Votes	%	±%
Conservative				
Liberal Democrats				
Labour				
UKIP				
Rejected ballots				
Majority				
Turnout				
gain from		Swing		

Middle Dales
Party	Candidate	Votes	%	±%
Conservative				
Liberal Democrats				
Labour				
UKIP				
Rejected ballots				
Majority				
Turnout				
gain from		Swing		

Richmond
Party	Candidate	Votes	%	±%
Conservative				
Liberal Democrats				
Labour				
UKIP				
Rejected ballots				
Majority				
Turnout				
gain from		Swing		

Richmondshire North
Party	Candidate	Votes	%	±%
Conservative				
Liberal Democrats				
Labour				
UKIP				
Rejected ballots				
Majority				
Turnout				
gain from		Swing		

Upper Dales
Party	Candidate	Votes	%	±%
Conservative				
Liberal Democrats				
Labour				
UKIP				
Rejected ballots				
Majority				
Turnout				
gain from		Swing		

=== Ryedale district ===
Hovingham and Sheriff Hutton
Party	Candidate	Votes	%	±%
Conservative				
Liberal Democrats				
Labour	Sam Prest			
UKIP				
Rejected ballots				
Majority				
Turnout				
gain from		Swing		

Kirkbymoorside
Party	Candidate	Votes	%	±%
Conservative				
Liberal Democrats				
Labour				
UKIP				
Rejected ballots				
Majority				
Turnout				
gain from		Swing		

Malton
Party	Candidate	Votes	%	±%
Conservative				
Liberal Democrats				
Labour	Tim Prest			
UKIP				
Rejected ballots				
Majority				
Turnout				
gain from		Swing		

Norton
Party	Candidate	Votes	%	±%
Conservative				
Liberal Democrats				
Labour				
UKIP				
Rejected ballots				
Majority				
Turnout				
gain from		Swing		

Pickering
Party	Candidate	Votes	%	±%
Conservative				
Liberal Democrats				
Labour				
UKIP				
Rejected ballots				
Majority				
Turnout				
gain from		Swing		

Thornton Dale and The Wolds
Party	Candidate	Votes	%	±%
Conservative				
Liberal Democrats				
Labour				
UKIP				
Rejected ballots				
Majority				
Turnout				
gain from		Swing		

=== Scarborough district ===
Castle
Party	Candidate	Votes	%	±%
Conservative				
Liberal Democrats				
Labour				
UKIP				
Rejected ballots				
Majority				
Turnout				
gain from		Swing		

Eastfield and Osgodby
Party	Candidate	Votes	%	±%
Conservative				
Liberal Democrats				
Labour				
UKIP				
Rejected ballots				
Majority				
Turnout				
gain from		Swing		

Esk Valley
Party	Candidate	Votes	%	±%
Conservative				
Liberal Democrats				
Labour				
UKIP				
Rejected ballots				
Majority				
Turnout				
gain from		Swing		

Falsgrave and Stepney
Party	Candidate	Votes	%	±%
Conservative				
Liberal Democrats				
Labour				
UKIP				
Rejected ballots				
Majority				
Turnout				
gain from		Swing		

Filey
Party	Candidate	Votes	%	±%
Conservative				
Liberal Democrats				
Labour				
UKIP				
Rejected ballots				
Majority				
Turnout				
gain from		Swing		

Hertford and Cayton
Party	Candidate	Votes	%	±%
Conservative				
Liberal Democrats				
Labour				
UKIP				
Rejected ballots				
Majority				
Turnout				
gain from		Swing		

Newby
Party	Candidate	Votes	%	±%
Conservative				
Liberal Democrats				
Labour				
UKIP				
Rejected ballots				
Majority				
Turnout				
gain from		Swing		

Northstead
Party	Candidate	Votes	%	±%
Conservative				
Liberal Democrats				
Labour				
UKIP				
Rejected ballots				
Majority				
Turnout				
gain from		Swing		

Scalby and The Coast
Party	Candidate	Votes	%	±%
Conservative				
Liberal Democrats				
Labour				
UKIP				
Rejected ballots				
Majority				
Turnout				
gain from		Swing		

Seamer and Derwent Valley
Party	Candidate	Votes	%	±%
Conservative				
Liberal Democrats				
Labour				
UKIP				
Rejected ballots				
Majority				
Turnout				
gain from		Swing		

Weaponness and Ramshill
Party	Candidate	Votes	%	±%
Conservative				
Liberal Democrats				
Labour				
UKIP				
Rejected ballots				
Majority				
Turnout				
gain from		Swing		

Whitby/Mayfield Cum Mulgrave
Party	Candidate	Votes	%	±%
Conservative				
Liberal Democrats				
Labour				
UKIP				
Rejected ballots				
Majority				
Turnout				
gain from		Swing		

Whitby/Streonshalh
Party	Candidate	Votes	%	±%
Conservative				
Liberal Democrats				
Labour				
UKIP				
Rejected ballots				
Majority				
Turnout				
gain from		Swing		

Woodlands
Party	Candidate	Votes	%	±%
Conservative				
Liberal Democrats				
Labour				
UKIP				
Rejected ballots				
Majority				
Turnout				
gain from		Swing		

=== Selby district ===
Cawood and Saxton
Party	Candidate	Votes	%	±%
Conservative	Andrew Lee	1041	67	
Labour	Rosie Corrigan	521	33	
Turnout		1562	29	
Conservative hold		Swing		

Escrick
Party	Candidate	Votes	%	±%
Conservative				
Liberal Democrats				
Labour				
UKIP				
Rejected ballots				
Majority				
Turnout				
gain from		Swing		

Mid Selby
Party	Candidate	Votes	%	±%
Conservative				
Liberal Democrats				
Labour				
UKIP				
Rejected ballots				
Majority				
Turnout				
gain from		Swing		

Osgoldcross
Party	Candidate	Votes	%	±%
Conservative				
Liberal Democrats				
Labour				
UKIP				
Rejected ballots				
Majority				
Turnout				
gain from		Swing		

Selby Barlby
Party	Candidate	Votes	%	±%
Conservative				
Liberal Democrats				
Labour				
UKIP				
Rejected ballots				
Majority				
Turnout				
gain from		Swing		

Selby Brayton
Party	Candidate	Votes	%	±%
Conservative				
Liberal Democrats				
Labour				
UKIP				
Rejected ballots				
Majority				
Turnout				
gain from		Swing		

Sherburn in Elmet
Party	Candidate	Votes	%	±%
Conservative				
Liberal Democrats				
Labour				
UKIP				
Rejected ballots				
Majority				
Turnout				
gain from		Swing		

South Selby
Party	Candidate	Votes	%	±%
Conservative				
Liberal Democrats				
Labour				
UKIP				
Rejected ballots				
Majority				
Turnout				
gain from		Swing		

Tadcaster
Party	Candidate	Votes	%	±%
Conservative				
Liberal Democrats				
Labour				
UKIP				
Rejected ballots				
Majority				
Turnout				
gain from		Swing		

== By-elections ==
South Selby by-election 14 October 2013 replacing Margaret Hulme (deceased)
Party	Candidate	Votes	%	±%
Conservative	Mike Jordan	592	37.0	−3.2
Labour	Rod Price	525	32.8	−1.6
UKIP	Colin Heath	282	17.6	N/A
Independent	David McSherry	201	12.6	−5.7
Majority		67	4.2	−1.6
Conservative hold		Swing		
