= 2009 North Yorkshire County Council election =

2009 UK local government election

← 2005	4 June 2009	2013 →

All 72 seats to North Yorkshire County Council 37 seats needed for a majority
	First party	Second party
Leader	John Weighell	Bill Hoult
Party	Conservative	Liberal Democrats
Leader's seat	Bedale	Knaresborough
Seats won	48	11
Seat change	▲7	▼5
	Third party	Fourth party
Leader		Steve Shaw-Wright
Party	Independent	Labour
Leader's seat		Selby Barlby (defeated)
Seats won	11	1
Seat change	▲7	▼8
- Map showing the results of the 2009 North Yorkshire County Council election. Striped divisions have mixed representation.
Council control before election
Conservative
Council control after election
Conservative

Elections to North Yorkshire County Council took place on 4 June 2009, having been delayed from 7 May, in order to coincide with elections to the European Parliament.

== Results ==
North Yorkshire County Council election, 2009
Party	Seats	Gains	Losses	Net gain/loss	Seats %	Votes %	Votes	+/−
Conservative	48	10	4	+6	66.6	51.9	100,032	
Liberal Democrats	11	2	7	-5	15.3	22.45	43,253	
Independent	11	4	0	+4	15.3	10.2	19,573	
Labour	1	0	6	-6	1.4	10.5	20,180	
Liberal	1	1	0	+1	1.4	0.85	1,636	
BNP	0	0	0	0	0	2.1	4,032	
Green	0	0	0	0	0	1.4	2,677	
UKIP	0	0	0	0	0	0.45	884	
Richmondshire Independent Group	0	0	0	0	0	0.22	432	
"No Party Specified"	0	0	0	0	0	0.14	267	
Alliance for Green Socialism	0	0	0	0	0	0.05	89	

== Divisional results ==
=== Craven district ===
Airedale division
Party	Candidate	Votes	%	±%
Conservative	Patrick Thomas Mulligan	1,210	46.86	
Liberal Democrats	Mark Andrew Wheeler	1,054	40.82	
Labour	Graeme John Hitchen	273	10.58	
Rejected ballots		45 (Note: Includes papers issued but not officially declared as rejected.)	1.74	
Majority		156	6.04	
Turnout		2,582	41.32	
Conservative gain from Liberal Democrats		Swing		

Mid-Craven division
Party	Candidate	Votes	%	±%
Conservative	Shelagh Marshall	2,101	61.04	
UKIP	Alexander Bentley	555	16.12	
Liberal Democrats	Andrew Rankine	494	14.35	
Labour	James Steed Black	279	8.11	
Rejected ballots		13	0.38	
Majority		1,546	44.92	
Turnout		3,442	50.34	
Conservative hold		Swing		

North Craven division
Party	Candidate	Votes	%	±%
Conservative	David Lloyd Ireton	1,978	77.81	
Labour	Christine Elsie Brackley	484	19.04	
Rejected ballots		80	3.15	
Majority		1,494	58.77	
Turnout		2,542	40.87	
Conservative hold		Swing		

Ribblesdale division
Party	Candidate	Votes	%	±%
Conservative	Richard Charles Welch	1,325	53.00	
Liberal Democrats	David Albert Heather	899	35.96	
Labour	James David Austin	239	9.56	
Rejected ballots		37	1.48	
Majority		426	17.04	
Turnout		2,500	40.08	
Conservative gain from Liberal Democrats		Swing		

Skipton East division
Party	Candidate	Votes	%	±%
Independent	Robert Geoffrey Heseltine	1,224	46.10	
Conservative	Christopher James Harbron	691	26.03	
Liberal Democrats	Stephen Walpole	266	10.02	
BNP	Patricia Margaret Claughton	241	9.08	
Labour	Duncan John Hall	212	7.98	
Rejected ballots		21	0.79	
Majority		533	20.08	
Turnout		2,655	38.17	
Independent hold		Swing		

Skipton West division
Party	Candidate	Votes	%	±%
Liberal Democrats	Polly English	956	40.46	
Conservative	Paul Howard Whitaker	875	37.03	
Labour	Peter Madeley	272	11.51	
BNP	Andrew Henry William Brons	242	10.24	
Rejected ballots		18	0.76	
Majority		81	3.43	
Turnout		2,363	41.09	
Liberal Democrats hold		Swing		

South Craven division
Party	Candidate	Votes	%	±%
Independent	Philip Melvin Barrett	1,709	68.91	
Conservative	John Francis Garton	334	13.47	
UKIP	Ian Bannister	329	13.27	
Labour	Robert Charles Battison	99	3.99	
Rejected ballots		9	0.36	
Majority		1375	55.44	
Turnout		2,480	41.44	
Independent hold		Swing		

=== Hambleton district ===
Bedale division
Party	Candidate	Votes	%	±%
Conservative	John Keith Weighell	1,609	56.30	
Independent	Ian Watkins	1,059	37.05	
Labour	Alan Richardson	180	6.30	
Rejected ballots		10	0.35	
Majority		550	19.24	
Turnout		2,858	43.34	
Conservative hold		Swing		

Easingwold division
Party	Candidate	Votes	%	±%
Conservative	Peter George Sowray	1,699	64.95	
Liberal Democrats	Robert Adamson	650	24.85	
Labour	Gerald Shaw	245	9.36	
Rejected ballots		22	0.84	
Majority		1,049	40.10	
Turnout		2,616	38.82	
Conservative hold		Swing		

Great Ayton division
Party	Candidate	Votes	%	±%
Conservative	Heather Moorhouse	1,380	58.90	
Liberal Democrats	John Tierney	629	26.85	
Labour	Michael Edward Newton	191	8.15	
BNP	Christopher Lawrence Impett	125	5.33	
Rejected ballots		18	0.77	
Majority		751	32.05	
Turnout		2,343	43.00	
Conservative hold		Swing		

North Hambleton division
Party	Candidate	Votes	%	±%
Conservative	Tim Swales	1,820	69.95	
Liberal Democrats	Bryn Griffiths	531	20.41	
Labour	Janet Seymour Kirk	223	8.57	
Rejected ballots		28	1.07	
Majority		1,289	49.54	
Turnout		2,602	42.77	
Conservative hold		Swing		

Northallerton division
Party	Candidate	Votes	%	±%
Conservative	Tony Hall	1,191	70.81	
Labour	Kathryn Jayne MacColl	431	25.62	
Rejected ballots		60	3.57	
Majority		760	45.18	
Turnout		1,682	26.60	
Conservative hold		Swing		

Romanby and Broomfield division
Party	Candidate	Votes	%	±%
Conservative	David Maurice Blades	1,652	64.16	
Liberal Democrats	Richard Thomas Short	536	20.82	
Labour	Ann Hutchings	365	14.17	
Rejected ballots		22	0.85	
Majority		1,116	43.34	
Turnout		2,575	37.94	
Conservative hold		Swing		

Sowerby division
Party	Candidate	Votes	%	±%
Conservative	Neville William Huxtable	1,480	55.08	
Independent	David Stuart Bentley	523	19.46	
Labour	Jonathan Roberts	474	17.64	
Liberal Democrats	Di Keal	199	7.41	
Rejected ballots		11	0.41	
Majority		957	35.62	
Turnout		2,687	41.59	
Conservative hold		Swing		

Stillington division
Party	Candidate	Votes	%	±%
Conservative	Caroline Patmore	1,884	69.50	
Liberal Democrats	Michael Beckett	507	18.70	
Labour	Rosemary Shaw	270	9.96	
Rejected ballots		50	1.84	
Majority		1,377	50.79	
Turnout		2,711	41.04	
Conservative hold		Swing		

Stokesley division
Party	Candidate	Votes	%	±%
Liberal Democrats	Caroline Margaret Seymour	1,545	53.06	
Conservative	Stephen Philip Dickins	1,205	41.38	
Labour	Gerald Ramsden	142	4.88	
Rejected ballots		20	0.68	
Majority		340	11.68	
Turnout		2,912	48.30	
Liberal Democrats hold		Swing		

Swale division
Party	Candidate	Votes	%	±%
Conservative	Arthur William Barker	1,823	72.78	
Liberal Democrats	Jean Lesley Burdett	459	18.32	
Labour	Jane Elizabeth Richardson	196	7.82	
Rejected ballots		27	1.08	
Majority		1,364	54.45	
Turnout		2,505	39.45	
Conservative hold		Swing		

Thirsk division
Party	Candidate	Votes	%	±%
Conservative	Gareth Wedgwood Dadd	1,824	80.32	
Liberal Democrats	Max Tanner	426	18.76	
Rejected ballots		21	0.92	
Majority		1,398	61.56	
Turnout		2,271	36.84	
Conservative hold		Swing		

=== Harrogate district ===
Ainsty division
Party	Candidate	Votes	%	±%
Conservative	John Savage	2,332	71.62	
Liberal Democrats	Simon James Oldroyd	642	19.72	
Labour	Stephen Cobb	247	7.59	
Rejected ballots		35	1.07	
Majority		1,690	51.90	
Turnout		3,256	46.30	
Conservative hold		Swing		

Boroughbridge division
Party	Candidate	Votes	%	±%
Conservative	John Watson	1,921	61.53	
Liberal Democrats	Keith Rothwell	997	31.94	
Labour	Lorraine Marie Ferris	169	5.41	
Rejected ballots		35	1.12	
Majority		924	29.60	
Turnout		3,122	42.55	
Conservative hold		Swing		

Harrogate Bilton and Nidd Gorge division (Note: Two candidates elected.)
Party	Candidate	Votes	%	±%
Liberal Democrats	Geoffrey Frederick Webber	1,947	24.54	
Liberal Democrats	Andrew Martin Goss	1,930	24.33	
Conservative	Robin Adderley	1,451	18.29	
Conservative	John Wren	1,220	15.37	
BNP	Steven Daniel Gill	476	6.00	
BNP	Paul Kevin Chitty	459	5.79	
Labour	Daniel Paul Joseph Maguire	405	5.10	
Rejected ballots		23	0.58 (Note: Percentages calculated assuming two votes per rejected ballot paper.)	
Majority		17	0.21	
Turnout		3,967	31.67	
Liberal Democrats hold		Swing		
Liberal Democrats hold		Swing		

Harrogate Central division
Party	Candidate	Votes	%	±%
Liberal Democrats	John Michael Fox	2,176	26.10	
Liberal Democrats	John Walter Marshall	1,948	23.37	
Conservative	Richard Cooper	1,922	23.06	
Conservative	Jean Mary Butterfield	1,892	22.70	
Labour	Michael Docherty	270	3.24	
Rejected ballots		64	1.53	
Majority		228	2.74	
Turnout		4,168 (Note: Turnout figure on the referenced page is the number of votes cast plus the number of rejected papers, as there are two votes per ballot paper the figure here is approximately half that reported.)	31.56	
Liberal Democrats hold		Swing		
Liberal Democrats hold		Swing		

Harrogate Harlow division
Party	Candidate	Votes	%	±%
Conservative	Jim Clark	1,785	60.16	
Liberal Democrats	Steve Macare	1,048	35.32	
Labour	Andrew Philip Gray	93	3.14	
Rejected ballots		41	1.38	
Majority		737	24.84	
Turnout		2,967	45.97	
Conservative gain from Liberal Democrats		Swing		

Harrogate Oatlands division
Party	Candidate	Votes	%	±%
Liberal Democrats	Keith Stephen Barnes	1,445	50.16	
Conservative	David Gilbert Simister	1,302	45.19	
Labour	Tony Pedel	97	3.37	
Rejected ballots		37	1.28	
Majority		143	4.96	
Turnout		2,881	43.94	
Liberal Democrats hold		Swing		

Harrogate Saltergate division
Party	Candidate	Votes	%	±%
Conservative	Don Mackenzie	1,502	57.64	
Liberal Democrats	Gordon Brian Charlton	951	36.49	
Labour	Janet Isabella Morrow	114	4.37	
Rejected ballots		39	1.50	
Majority		551	21.14	
Turnout		2,606	39.48	
Conservative gain from Liberal Democrats		Swing		

Harrogate Starbeck division
Party	Candidate	Votes	%	±%
Liberal Democrats	Margaret-Ann De Courcey-Bayley	1,124	57.03	
Conservative	Richard John Cain	637	32.32	
Labour	Geoff Foxall	171	8.67	
Rejected ballots		39	1.98	
Majority		487	24.71	
Turnout		1,971	30.40	
Liberal Democrats hold		Swing		

Knaresborough division (Note: Percentage does not total 100% as some papers only contained one vote.)
Party	Candidate	Votes	%	±%
Liberal Democrats	Bill Hoult	1,985	21.00	
Conservative	John Batt	1,765	18.67	
Conservative	Ivor Fox	1,719	18.18	
Liberal Democrats	Andrew Christopher Willoughby	1,659	17.54	
Independent	Robert Geoffrey Heseltine	1,240	13.11	
Labour	David Crosthwaite	355	3.75	
Rejected ballots		31	0.65	
Majority		220	2.33	
Turnout		4,728	39.36	
Liberal Democrats hold		Swing		
Conservative gain from Liberal Democrats		Swing		

Lower Nidderdale and Bishop Monkton division
Party	Candidate	Votes	%	±%
Conservative	Heather Joyce Garnett	2,176	70.28	
Liberal Democrats	Phillip Stephen Barlow	745	24.06	
Labour	Janet Elizabeth Williams	125	4.04	
Rejected ballots		50	1.62	
Majority		1,431	46.22	
Turnout		3,096	44.36	
Conservative hold		Swing		

Masham and Fountains division
Party	Candidate	Votes	%	±%
Conservative	Paul Aidan Richardson	1,878	69.12	
Liberal Democrats	Angela June Hosie	805	29.63	
Rejected ballots		34	1.25	
Majority		1,073	39.49	
Turnout		2,717	41.18	
Conservative hold		Swing		

Pannal and Lower Wharfedale division
Party	Candidate	Votes	%	±%
Conservative	Cliff Trotter	2,209	69.66	
Liberal Democrats	Jack Duckworth	800	25.23	
Labour	Greg Lodge	142	4.48	
Rejected ballots		20	0.63	
Majority		1,409	44.43	
Turnout		3,171	46.91	
Conservative hold		Swing		

Pateley Bridge division
Party	Candidate	Votes	%	±%
Conservative	John Fort	2,459	83.41	
Labour	Deborah Ann Havercroft	390	13.23	
Rejected ballots		99	3.36	
Majority		2,069	70.18	
Turnout		2,948	44.26	
Conservative hold		Swing		

Ripon North division
Party	Candidate	Votes	%	±%
Conservative	Bernard Arthur Bateman	967	42.56	
Liberal Democrats	John Stockdale	490	21.57	
Independent	Sid Hawke	461	20.29	
Party not declared	Stanley Mackintosh	238	10.48	
Labour	Althea Farmer	98	4.31	
Rejected ballots		18	0.79	
Majority		477	20.99	
Turnout		2,272	35.31	
Conservative gain from Liberal Democrats		Swing		

Ripon South division
Party	Candidate	Votes	%	±%
Independent	Andrew Williams	1,365	63.64	
Conservative	Mike Chambers	344	16.04	
Independent	Kenn Hart	221	10.30	
Liberal Democrats	Kathy Weidemann	205	9.56	
Rejected ballots		10	0.46	
Majority		1,021	47.60	
Turnout		2,145	37.13	
Independent hold		Swing		

=== Richmondshire district ===
Catterick Bridge division
Party	Candidate	Votes	%	±%
Conservative	Carl Anthony Les	1,057	50.67	
Independent	Jill McMullon	566	27.13	
Green	Leslie Rowe	391	18.75	
Labour	Eric Walter Beechey	62	2,97	
Rejected ballots		10	0.48	
Majority		491	23.54	
Turnout		2,086	37.71	
Conservative hold		Swing		

Central Richmondshire division
Party	Candidate	Votes	%	±%
Conservative	Melva Jean Steckles	763	44.13	
The Richmondshire Independent Group	Helen Mary Grant	432	24.99	
Liberal Democrats	John Robinson	289	16.71	
Green	Dave Dalton	147	8.50	
Labour	Anne Evelyn Mannix	84	4.86	
Rejected ballots		14	0.81	
Majority		331	19.14	
Turnout		1,729	22.57	
Conservative hold		Swing		

Middle Dales division
Party	Candidate	Votes	%	±%
Conservative	Roger Harrison-Topham	1,403	57.24	
Liberal Democrats	Linda Curran	678	27.66	
Independent	Tony Pelton	245	10.00	
Labour	Roy Hutchings	105	4.28	
Rejected ballots		20	0.82	
Majority		725	29.58	
Turnout		2,451	42.93	
Conservative hold		Swing		

Richmond division
Party	Candidate	Votes	%	±%
Liberal Democrats	Stuart Parsons	1,511	55.45	
Conservative	Russell Frederick Lord	1,025	37.62	
Labour	Jeffrey Edward King	148	5.43	
Rejected ballots		41	1.50	
Majority		486	17.83	
Turnout		2,725	41.89	
Liberal Democrats hold		Swing		

Richmondshire North division
Party	Candidate	Votes	%	±%
Conservative	Michael Heseltine	1,564	57.02	
Liberal Democrats	Jane Elizabeth Parlour	819	29.86	
Green	Emir Nader	200	7.29	
Labour	Mark Thorpe	150	5.47	
Rejected ballots		10	0.36	
Majority		745	27.16	
Turnout		2,743	44.78	
Conservative hold		Swing		

Upper Dales division
Party	Candidate	Votes	%	±%
Independent	John Blackie	1,859	73.39	
Conservative	Muriel Rose Blythman	369	14.57	
Green	Robbie Kelly	236	9.32	
Labour	Peter Leonard Cornwall	66	2.60	
Rejected ballots		3	0.12	
Majority		1,490	58.82	
Turnout		2,533	52.46	
Independent gain from Conservative		Swing		

=== Ryedale district ===
Hovingham and Sheriff Hutton division
Party	Candidate	Votes	%	±%
Conservative	Clare Launa Wood	2,326	71.77	
Liberal Democrats	Marian Hodgson	698	21.54	
Labour	Jean Bills	179	5.52	
Rejected ballots		38	1.17	
Majority		1,628	50.23	
Turnout		3,241	47.99	
Conservative hold		Swing		

Kirkbymoorside division
Party	Candidate	Votes	%	±%
Conservative	Val Arnold	1,730	64.24	
Liberal	Nelly Trevelyan	378	14.04	
Liberal Democrats	Jack Wilford	324	12.03	
Labour	Judy Dixon	229	8.50	
Rejected ballots		32	1.19	
Majority		1,352	50.20	
Turnout		2,693	42.18	
Conservative hold		Swing		

Malton division
Party	Candidate	Votes	%	±%
Conservative	Michael Knaggs	1,428	53.20	
Liberal Democrats	Howard Leslie Keal	1,043	38.86	
Labour	Cliff Williams	178	6.63	
Rejected ballots		35	1.31	
Majority		385	14.34	
Turnout		2,684	39.62	
Conservative hold		Swing		

Norton division
Party	Candidate	Votes	%	±%
Conservative	Stephen Shaw	981	42.14	
Liberal Democrats	David Lloyd-Williams	908	39.00	
BNP	Jeff Kelly	238	10.23	
Labour	Heather Milner	190	8.16	
Rejected ballots		11	0.47	
Majority		73	3.14	
Turnout		2,328	32.97	
Conservative gain from Liberal Democrats		Swing		

Pickering division
Party	Candidate	Votes	%	±%
Liberal	John Samuel Clark	1,258	43.65	
Conservative	Greg White	1,200	41.64	
Green	Chris Newsam	280	9.72	
Labour	Doreen Davies	120	4.16	
Rejected ballots		25	0.87	
Majority		58	2.01	
Turnout		2,882 (Note: The total number of votes plus the rejected papers is greater than the number of papers issued)	42.58	
Liberal gain from Conservative		Swing		

Thornton Dale and The Wolds division
Party	Candidate	Votes	%	±%
Conservative	Ron Haigh	1,665	60.81	
Liberal Democrats	Janice William	804	29.36	
Labour	Rod Price	239	8.73	
Rejected ballots		30	1.10	
Majority		861	31.45	
Turnout		2,738	39.19	
Conservative hold		Swing		

=== Scarborough district ===
Castle division
Party	Candidate	Votes	%	±%
Independent	Janet Helen Jefferson	694	43.08	
Conservative	Ros Fox	319	19.80	
Labour	Michelle Andrew	240	14.90	
Green	Jason Frank Mullen	222	13.78	
Liberal Democrats	Malcolm Short	119	7.39	
Rejected ballots		17	1.05	
Majority		375	23.28	
Turnout		1,611 (Note: Referenced turnout adjusted by the number of rejected ballots for consistency with other districts.)	31.51	
Independent gain from Labour		Swing		

Eastfield and Osgodby division
Party	Candidate	Votes	%	±%
Liberal Democrats	Brian Simpson	607	43.08	
Independent	Norman Kenneth Murphy	345	24.48	
Conservative	Debbie Nock	260	18.45	
Labour	Tracey Ann White	170	12.07	
Rejected ballots		27	1.92	
Majority		264	18.74	
Turnout		1,409	27.56	
Liberal Democrats gain from Labour		Swing		

Esk Valley division
Party	Candidate	Votes	%	±%
Conservative	Herbert Tindall	1,742	74.86	
Labour	Janet Peake	512	22.00	
Rejected ballots		73	3.14	
Majority		1,230	52.86	
Turnout		2,327	43.56	
Conservative hold		Swing		

Falsgrave and Stepney division
Party	Candidate	Votes	%	±%
Independent	Pat Marsburg	531	25.73	
Conservative	Robert John Owens	480	23.25	
Green	David Hugh Malone	433	20.98	
Labour	Andrew Phillip Sharp	259	12.55	
Liberal Democrats	Kev Riley	204	9.88	
BNP	Kevan Foulds	151	7.32	
Rejected ballots		6	0.29	
Majority		51	2.47	
Turnout		2,064	32.64	
Independent gain from Labour		Swing		

Filey division
Party	Candidate	Votes	%	±%
Independent	Mike Cockerill	709	35.27	
Conservative	Colin Haddington	609	30.30	
Independent	Sam Cross	383	19.05	
BNP	Trisha Scott	180	8.96	
Labour	Julia Gatie	114	5.67	
Rejected ballots		15	0.75	
Majority		100	4.98	
Turnout		2,010	36.55	
Independent gain from Conservative		Swing		

Hertford and Cayton division
Party	Candidate	Votes	%	±%
Conservative	John Stephen Blackburn	1,403	54.42	
Independent	Gordon Johnson	635	24.63	
Liberal Democrats	Johan Zegstroo	267	10.36	
Labour	John White	247	9.58	
Rejected ballots		26	1.01	
Majority		768	29.79	
Turnout		2,578	38.86	
Conservative hold		Swing		

Newby division
Party	Candidate	Votes	%	±%
Conservative	Andrew Backhouse	685	33.94	
Labour	Phil McDonald	406	20.12	
Liberal Democrats	Liz R Black	392	19.43	
Independent	Bill Miller	370	18.33	
Green	Sarah Joanne Priestley	160	7.93	
Rejected ballots		5	0.25	
Majority		279	13.83	
Turnout		2,018	38.33	
Conservative hold		Swing		

Northstead division
Party	Candidate	Votes	%	±%
Independent	Peter Popple	567	30.72	
Conservative	Derek James Bastiman	504	27.30	
Labour	Eric Broadbent	350	18.96	
Green	Kate White	228	12.35	
Liberal Democrats	Chris Walker	182	9.86	
Rejected ballots		15	0.81	
Majority		63	3.41	
Turnout		1,846	30.61	
Independent gain from Labour		Swing		

Scalby and The Coast division
Party	Candidate	Votes	%	±%
Conservative	Helen Gail Swiers	1,915	60.76	
Liberal Democrats	Magnus Laurence Johnson	919	29.16	
Labour	Jude Thurlow	281	8.91	
Rejected ballots		37	1.17	
Majority		996	31.60	
Turnout		3,152	44.66	
Conservative hold		Swing		

Seamer and Derwent Valley division
Party	Candidate	Votes	%	±%
Conservative	David Colin Jeffels	1,387	46.61	
Independent	Mick Jay-Hanmer	908	30.51	
Liberal Democrats	Bob Jackman	498	16.73	
Labour	Subash Chunder Sharma	176	5.91	
Rejected ballots		7	0.24	
Majority		479	16.10	
Turnout		2,976	39.51	
Conservative hold		Swing		

Weaponness and Ramshill division
Party	Candidate	Votes	%	±%
Independent	Penny Marsden	933	38.76	
Conservative	Martin Smith	797	33.11	
Liberal Democrats	Rod Rodgers	305	12.67	
Labour	Barry John Edwards	185	7.69	
Green	Judy Deans	175	7.27	
Rejected ballots		12	0.50	
Majority		136	5.65	
Turnout		2,407 (Note: Turnout figure on the referenced page is incorrect, changed to the number of votes cast plus the number of rejected papers.)	35.82	
Independent gain from Conservative		Swing		

Whitby/Mayfield Cum Mulgrave division
Party	Candidate	Votes	%	±%
Conservative	Jane Margaret Kenyon	1,055	46.15	
Independent	Mike Ward	851	37.23	
Labour	Diana Jeuda	362	15.83	
Rejected ballots		18	0.79	
Majority		204	8.92	
Turnout		2,286	34.02	
Conservative hold		Swing		

Whitby/Streonshalh division
Party	Candidate	Votes	%	±%
Conservative	Joe Plant	759	36.11	
Liberal Democrats	Graham Peirson	395	18.79	
Independent	Sandra Tuner	381	18.12	
Labour	Gerald Alick James Dennett	273	12.99	
Independent	John Dickinson	116	5.52	
Alliance for Green Socialism	Juliet Marie Boddington	89	4.23	
Independent	Steve Smith	79	3.76	
Rejected ballots		10	0.48	
Majority		364	17.31	
Turnout		2,102	30.43	
Conservative gain from Liberal Democrats		Swing		

Woodlands division
Party	Candidate	Votes	%	±%
Independent	Bill Chatt	442	24.23	
Conservative	Peter Russell Southward	438	24.01	
Labour	David Lawrence Billing	364	19.96	
Liberal Democrats	Geoffrey Evans	361	19.79	
Green	Chris Philips	205	11.24	
Rejected ballots		14	0.77	
Majority		4	0.22	
Turnout		1,824	31.84	
Independent gain from Labour		Swing		

=== Selby district ===
Cawood and Saxton division
Party	Candidate	Votes	%	±%
Conservative	Andrew Lee	1,570	73.33	
Labour	Jan Marshall	493	23.03	
Rejected ballots		78	3.64	
Majority		1,077	50.30	
Turnout		2,141	41.36	
Conservative hold		Swing		

Escrick division
Party	Candidate	Votes	%	±%
Conservative	Elizabeth Ann Casling	1,740	66.62	
Liberal Democrats	Ian Michael Cuthbertson	522	19.98	
Labour	Ted Mansfield	320	12.25	
Rejected ballots		30	1.15	
Majority		1,218	46.63	
Turnout		2,612	42.44	
Conservative hold		Swing		

Mid Selby division
Party	Candidate	Votes	%	±%
Conservative	Chris Pearson	1,366	59.65	
Labour	Paul Harvey	519	22.66	
Liberal Democrats	Richard Hall	362	15.81	
Rejected ballots		43	1.88	
Majority		847	36.99	
Turnout		2,290	38.10	
Conservative hold		Swing		

Osgoldcross division
Party	Candidate	Votes	%	±%
Independent	John Burgess McCartney	1,236	47.69	
Conservative	Gillian Carol Ivey	1,076	41.51	
Labour	Jack Davie	267	10.30	
Rejected ballots		13	0.50	
Majority		160	6.17	
Turnout		2,592	41,87	
Independent gain from Conservative		Swing		

Selby Barlby division
Party	Candidate	Votes	%	±%
Conservative	Karl Vincent Arthur	1,652	20.08	
Labour	Brian Marshall	1,643	19.97	
Conservative	David Arthur Fagan	1,612	19.59	
Labour	Steve Shaw-Wright	1,607	19.53	
BNP	Stephen Ward	608	7.39	
BNP	Duncan Lorriman	555	6.75	
Rejected ballots		50	1.22	
Majority		9	0.11	
Turnout		4,114	30.81	
Conservative gain from Labour		Swing		
Labour hold		Swing		

Selby Brayton division
Party	Candidate	Votes	%	±%
Conservative	Dave Peart	1,379	52.02	
Labour	Graham Gatman	616	23.24	
Liberal Democrats	Kevin Brian Hawkins	358	13.50	
BNP	Ernest Watts	280	10.56	
Rejected ballots		20	0.75	
Majority		763	28.78	
Turnout		2,651	39.09	
Conservative gain from Labour		Swing		

Sherburn in Elmet division
Party	Candidate	Votes	%	±%
Conservative	Mike Jordan	1,399	52.83	
Labour	Jim Snowball	946	35.73	
BNP	Belinda Robson	274	10.35	
Rejected ballots		30	1.13	
Majority		453	17.11	
Turnout		2,648	39.65	
Conservative gain from Labour		Swing		

South Selby division
Party	Candidate	Votes	%	±%
Conservative	Margaret Hulme	1,580	69.12	
Labour	Stephanie Duckett	640	27.99	
Rejected ballots		66	2.89	
Majority		940	41.12	
Turnout		2,286	35.93	
Conservative hold		Swing		

Tadcaster division
Party	Candidate	Votes	%	±%
Conservative	Chris Metcalfe	1,053	50.09	
Liberal Democrats	Roderic Parker	640	30.45	
BNP	Sam Matthew Clayton	203	9.66'	
Labour	Brian Rogerson	189	8.99	
Rejected ballots		17	0.81	
Majority		413	19.65	
Turnout		2,102	36.32	
Conservative hold		Swing		
