= Scarborough Borough Council elections =

Local government elections in North Yorkshire, England

Scarborough Borough Council in North Yorkshire, England was established in 1974 and abolished in 2023. It was elected once every four years.

== Political control ==
The first election to the council was held in 1973, initially operating as a shadow authority alongside the outgoing authorities until it came into its powers on 1 April 1974. Political control from 1974 until its abolition in 2023 was as follows:

Party in control	Years
No overall control	1974–1976
Conservative	1976–1983
No overall control	1983–2003
Conservative	2003–2007
No overall control	2007–2015
Conservative	2015–2019
No overall control	2019–2023

=== Leadership ===
The role of mayor was largely ceremonial. Political leadership was provided by the leader of the council. The leaders of the council from 1974 until the council's abolition in 2023 were:

Councillor	Party	From	To
Ernest Pilgrim	Conservative	1974	May 1979
David Jenkinson	Conservative	May 1979	21 Nov 1986
Ernest Pilgrim	Conservative	Dec 1986	Apr 1988
Bob Bedford	Conservative	1988	May 1991
Ian Stubbs	Labour	May 1991	May 1992
Mavis Don	Labour	14 May 1992	May 1999
Eileen Bosomworth	Conservative	27 May 1999	4 Sep 2006
Tom Fox	Conservative	4 Sep 2006	May 2015
Derek Bastiman	Conservative	12 May 2015	May 2019
Steve Siddons	Labour	7 May 2019	31 Mar 2023

== Council elections ==
- 1973 Scarborough Borough Council election
- 1976 Scarborough Borough Council election
- 1979 Scarborough Borough Council election (New ward boundaries)
- 1983 Scarborough Borough Council election
- 1987 Scarborough Borough Council election
- 1991 Scarborough Borough Council election
- 1995 Scarborough Borough Council election
- 1999 Scarborough Borough Council election
- 2003 Scarborough Borough Council election (New ward boundaries increased the number of seats by 1)
- 2007 Scarborough Borough Council election
- 2011 Scarborough Borough Council election
- 2015 Scarborough Borough Council election
- 2019 Scarborough Borough Council election (New ward boundaries)

== Council composition ==
Year	Conservative	Labour	Liberal Democrats	Green	UKIP	Independent	Council control after election
1999	17	13	5	0	0	14	No overall control
2003	27	8	2	0	0	13	Conservative
2007	23	4	6	2	0	15	No overall control
2011	25	6	3	2	0	14	Conservative
2015	26	14	0	2	5	3	Conservative
2019	16	13	0	2	1	14	No overall control

== Results maps ==
2003 results map

2007 results map

2011 results map

2015 results map

2019 results map

== By-election results ==
=== 1999-2003 ===
Streonshalh By-Election 4 May 2000 (2)
Party	Candidate	Votes	%	±%
Liberal Democrats		685		
Independent		502		
Labour		445		
Labour		362		
Conservative		300		
Conservative		275		
Independent		272		
Independent		180		
Turnout		3,021	33.0	
Liberal Democrats gain from Labour		Swing		
Independent gain from Labour		Swing		

Scarborough Central By-Election 23 November 2000
Party	Candidate	Votes	%	±%
Labour		415	49.5	+9.7
Independent		227	26.9	+6.7
Liberal Democrats		150	17.8	−3.0
Conservative		51	6.0	−13.5
Majority		188	22.6	
Turnout		843	21.0	
Labour hold		Swing		

Mayfield By-Election 19 April 2001
Party	Candidate	Votes	%	±%
Conservative	Andy Lowe	500	35.9	+0.3
Labour	Carol Slater	483	34.7	+6.3
Liberal Democrats	Chris Gledhill	346	24.8	+24.8
Independent	Ian Waller	64	4.6	−31.3
Majority		17	1.2	
Turnout		1,393	23.6	
Conservative gain from Independent		Swing		

Ayton By-Election 31 January 2002
Party	Candidate	Votes	%	±%
Conservative	Peter Bull	417	48.6	−4.2
Liberal Democrats	Robert Peacock	242	28.2	−7.8
Independent	Patricia Colling	144	16.8	+16.8
Labour	Paul Murphy	55	6.4	−4.8
Majority		175	20.4	
Turnout		858	41.7	
Conservative hold		Swing		

=== 2003-2007 ===
Woodlands By-Election 18 March 2004
Party	Candidate	Votes	%	±%
Independent	Philip McDonald	274	38.6	−8.2
Labour	Angela Andrew	198	27.9	−3.5
Conservative	Mark Gay	138	19.5	−2.3
Green	Dilys Cluer	69	9.7	+9.7
Socialist Alliance	Rachel Boyes	30	4.2	+4.2
Majority		76	10.7	
Turnout		709	22.9	
Independent gain from Labour		Swing		

Stepney By-Election 5 May 2005
Party	Candidate	Votes	%	±%
Labour	Ian Stubbs	750	36.1	+6.6
Conservative	Keith Burnett	546	26.3	−5.0
Green	Jonathan Dixon	425	20.5	+5.5
Independent	Frank Wright	242	11.6	−12.6
Independent	Neil Buglass	115	5.5	+5.5
Majority		204	9.8	
Turnout		2,078		
Labour gain from Conservative		Swing		

Ramshill By-Election 11 May 2006
Party	Candidate	Votes	%	±%
Conservative	Eileen Vickers	258	34.5	−13.6
Independent	Amanda Robinson	244	32.7	+32.7
Labour	Andrew Sharp	174	23.3	−28.6
Liberal Democrats	Michael Heslop-Mullens	71	9.5	+9.5
Majority		14	1.8	
Turnout		747	26.3	
Conservative hold		Swing		

Stepney By-Election 11 May 2006
Party	Candidate	Votes	%	±%
Green	Jonathan Dixon	341	27.6	+12.2
Conservative	Heather Phillips	253	20.5	−10.7
Liberal Democrats	Margaret Pitts	209	16.9	+16.9
Labour	Patricia Marsburg	181	14.7	−14.6
BNP	Patricia Scott	154	12.5	+12.5
Independent	Neil Buglass	96	7.8	−16.3
Majority		88	7.1	
Turnout		1,234	32.3	
Green gain from Conservative		Swing		

Filey By-Election 27 July 2006
Party	Candidate	Votes	%	±%
Conservative	Geoffrey Cullern	322	22.8	−12.6
Independent	Michael Cockerill	312	22.1	−23.4
Independent	Samuel Cross	282	20.0	+20.0
BNP	Patricia Scott	181	12.8	+12.8
Independent	Gordon Johnson	127	9.0	+9.0
Labour	Elizabeth Carrington	126	8.9	−10.2
Liberal Democrats	Michael Heslop-Mullens	62	4.4	+4.4
Majority		10	0.7	
Turnout		1,412	26.5	
Conservative hold		Swing		

Hertford By-Election 30 November 2006
Party	Candidate	Votes	%	±%
Conservative	David Chambers	736	73.4	+18.3
BNP	Patricia Scott	267	26.6	+26.6
Majority		469	46.8	
Turnout		1,003	25.1	
Conservative hold		Swing		

=== 2007-2011 ===
Hertford By-Election 13 August 2009
Party	Candidate	Votes	%	±%
Green	Nick Harvey	894	66.5	+41.7
Conservative	Chris Hodgson	356	26.5	−9.3
Independent	Gordon Johnson	94	7.0	+7.0
Majority		538	40.0	
Turnout		1,344	32.7	
Green gain from Conservative		Swing		

Streonshalh By-Election 13 August 2009
Party	Candidate	Votes	%	±%
Independent	Sandra Turner	246	45.3	+12.1
Liberal Democrats	Graham Peirson	95	17.5	−29.6
Conservative	Barry Gregson	80	14.7	−4.9
Labour	John Chilton	74	13.6	+13.6
Independent	John Dickinson	48	8.8	+8.8
Majority		151	27.8	
Turnout		543	14.8	
Independent gain from Liberal Democrats		Swing		

Mayfield By-Election 11 February 2010
Party	Candidate	Votes	%	±%
Conservative	Steven Leadley	436	38.5	
Independent	Derek Robinson	282	24.9	
Labour	Janet Peake	238	21.0	
Independent	Bill Miller	112	9.9	
Liberal Democrats	Christopher Cawood	65	5.7	
Majority		154	13.6	
Turnout		1,133	30.0	
Conservative hold		Swing		

Eastfield By-Election 24 September 2010
Party	Candidate	Votes	%	±%
Liberal Democrats	Johan Zegstroo	182	31	
Labour	John Warburton	159	27	
Independent	Nick Butterworth	110	19	
Conservative	Martin Morris	100	17	
BNP	Trisha Scott	27	5	
Green	Mick Cutler	13	2	
Majority		23	3.9	
Turnout		591		
Liberal Democrats hold		Swing		

=== 2011-2015 ===
Hertford By-Election 15 March 2012
Party	Candidate	Votes	%	±%
Conservative	Michelle Donohue-Moncrieff	663	60.5	+22.6
Labour	Vanda Inman	208	19.0	+6.9
UKIP	Michael James	126	11.5	+11.5
Liberal Democrats	Bob Jackman	99	9.0	+9.0
Majority		455	41.5	
Turnout		1,096		
Conservative gain from Green		Swing		

Esk Valley By-Election 20 September 2012
Party	Candidate	Votes	%	±%
Conservative	Guy Coulson	606	67.6	+7.8
Independent	Mike Ward	151	16.8	+16.8
Labour	Simon Parkes	87	9.7	−9.5
UKIP	Michael James	35	3.9	+3.9
English Democrat	Ed Scott	18	2.0	+2.0
Majority		455	50.7	
Turnout		897		
Conservative hold		Swing		

Esk Valley By-Election 2 May 2013
Party	Candidate	Votes	%	±%
Independent	Mike Ward	698	67.1	+67.1
Labour	Simon Parkes	178	17.1	−2.1
Liberal Democrats	Bob Jackman	164	15.8	+15.8
Majority		520	50.0	
Turnout		1,040		
Independent gain from Conservative		Swing		

Streonshalh By-Election 2 May 2013
Party	Candidate	Votes	%	±%
Labour	Tina Davy	229	29.7	−4.0
Independent	Derek Robinson	209	27.1	+27.1
UKIP	John Thistle	209	27.1	+27.1
Conservative	Janet MacDonald	125	16.2	−27.8
Majority		20	2.6	
Turnout		772		
Labour gain from Conservative		Swing		

Newby By-Election 22 August 2013
Party	Candidate	Votes	%	±%
Conservative	Sue Backhouse	380	35.2	+8.5
UKIP	Andy Smith	285	26.4	+26.4
Labour	Carl Maw	197	18.2	−1.0
Independent	Bonnie Purchon	143	13.2	+13.2
Green	Helen Kindness	76	7.0	−5.2
Majority		95	8.8	
Turnout		1,081		
Conservative gain from Independent		Swing		

Ramshill By-Election 22 August 2013
Party	Candidate	Votes	%	±%
Labour	Steve Siddons	190	32.5	+15.3
UKIP	Michael James	149	25.5	+25.5
Conservative	Peter Southward	122	20.9	−2.3
Green	Mark Vesey	67	11.5	−3.9
Liberal Democrats	Lana Rodgers	56	9.6	−7.6
Majority		41	7.0	
Turnout		584		
Labour gain from Conservative		Swing		

Eastfield By-Election 21 November 2013
Party	Candidate	Votes	%	±%
Labour	Tony Randerson	310	48.8	+19.8
UKIP	Jonathan Dodds	175	27.6	+27.6
Independent	Carole Gerarda	97	15.3	+3.9
Conservative	William Barnes	32	5.0	−4.7
Green	Annette Hudspeth	11	1.7	+1.7
Independent	Dawn Maxwell	10	1.6	+1.6
Majority		135	21.3	
Turnout		635		
Labour gain from Liberal Democrats		Swing		

Derwent Valley By-Election 22 May 2014
Party	Candidate	Votes	%	±%
Conservative	Heather Phillips	632	42.1	−4.5
UKIP	Michael James	383	25.5	+25.5
Labour	Marcus Missen	183	12.2	+12.2
Liberal Democrats	Robert Lockwood	109	7.3	−10.6
Green	Michael Cutler	99	6.6	+6.6
Independent	David Wright	96	6.4	+6.4
Majority		249	16.6	
Turnout		1,502		
Conservative gain from Independent		Swing		

=== 2015-2019 ===
Mulgrave By-Election 29 August 2017
Party	Candidate	Votes	%	±%
Conservative	Marion Watson	395	46.5	+11.4
Labour	Hugo Fearnley	299	35.2	+19.6
Independent	John Armsby	118	13.9	−7.9
Yorkshire	Lee Derrick	37	4.4	+4.4
Majority		96	11.3	
Turnout		849		
Conservative hold		Swing		

=== 2019-2023 ===
Mayfield By-Election 31 March 2022
Party	Candidate	Votes	%	±%
Conservative	John Nock	268	45.8	−1.5
Labour	Gerald Dennett	142	24.3	−6.7
Independent	Linda Wild	122	20.9	+20.9
Yorkshire	Lee Derrick	53	9.1	+9.1
Majority		126	21.5	
Turnout		585		
Conservative hold		Swing		
