= 2016 Green Party of England and Wales leadership election =

- 5 July – 2 September 2016
- Turnout: 15,773 (29.8%) ▲4.3 pp
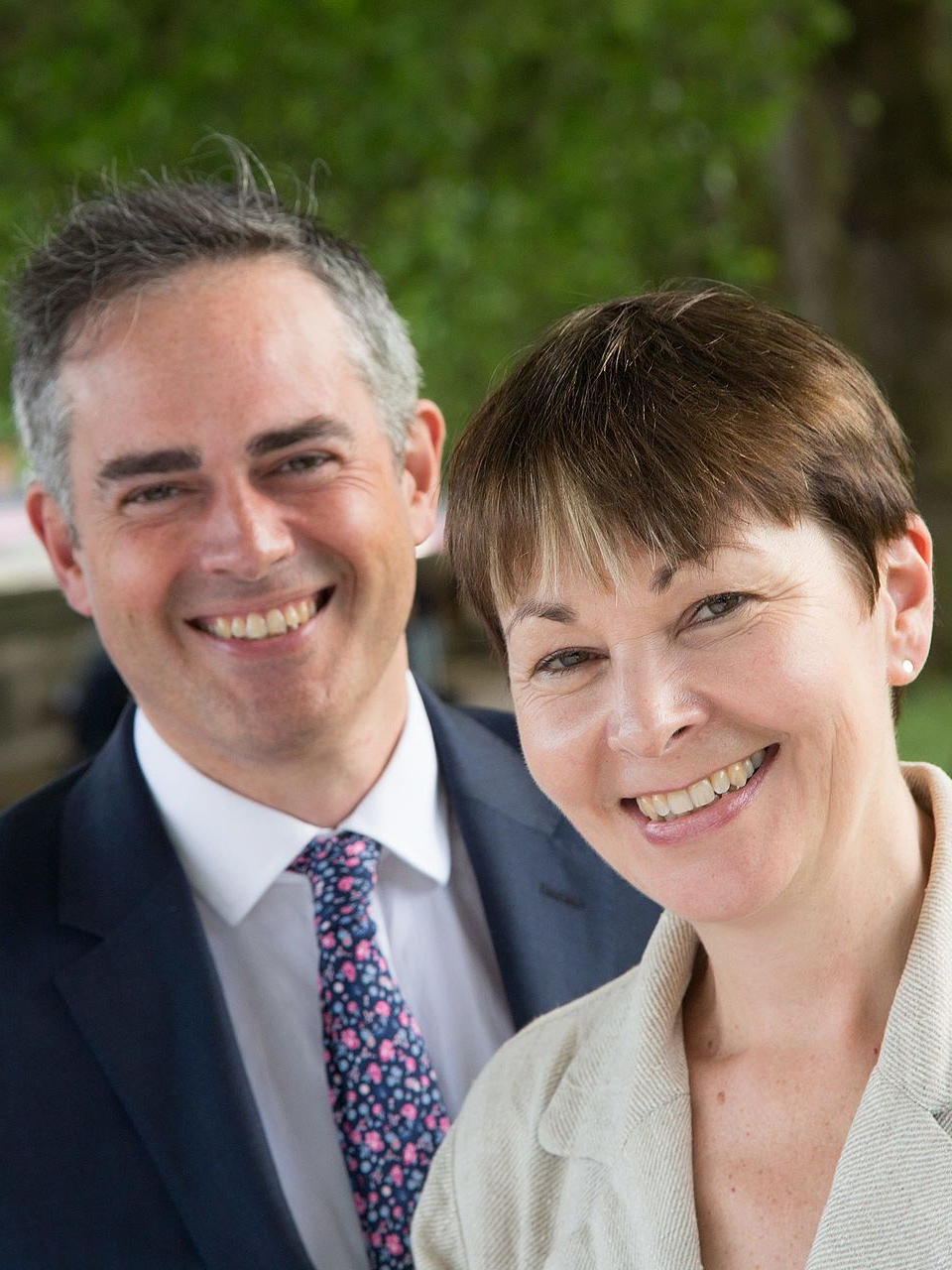

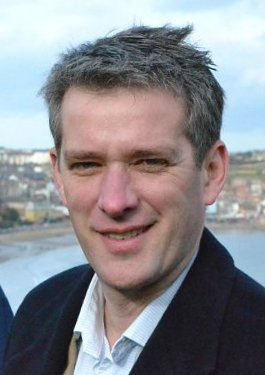
Candidate	Jonathan Bartley and Caroline Lucas	David Malone
Popular vote	13,570	956
Percentage	86.0%	6.1%
Leader before election
Natalie Bennett
Elected Leaders
Jonathan Bartley & Caroline Lucas

The 2016 Green Party of England and Wales leadership election took place from July to August 2016 to select a leader of the Green Party of England and Wales. The incumbent leader, Natalie Bennett, announced in May 2016 that she was not going to stand for re-election. The election was won by a joint platform of the party's former leader and only MP Caroline Lucas, with the party's work and pensions spokesperson Jonathan Bartley.

At the same time, Amelia Womack was re-elected as deputy leader.

== Background ==
Prior to 2008, the party had elected spokespeople called principal speakers instead of an elected leadership. Caroline Lucas, then an MEP for South East England, was elected as the first leader of party in 2008 following a rule change. In the new system, it was mandated that there would be leadership elections every two years. Lucas was elected as the first Green Party MP, for the constituency of Brighton Pavilion in 2010, and in the same year she was re-elected unopposed as leader. In 2012, she announced she would not be seeking re-election because "I want to give other people the opportunity to get well known, to have some profile in the party, hopefully to use that to get themselves elected as well."

In the 2012 leadership election, Natalie Bennett, a journalist for The Guardian, was elected to succeed Lucas as party leader. She was re-elected unopposed in the 2014 leadership election and led the party in the 2015 general election. At the general election, the Green Party's vote share increased from 1.0% to 3.8%, but they did not win any additional seats. Following the 2016 local elections, in which the Green Party lost four local councillors but came third in the London Assembly and in the London mayoral election, Bennett defended her record as leader. On 15 May 2016, Bennett announced she would not be seeking re-election, saying: "There have been times when I got things right, and times when I got things wrong, but that’s because I'm not a smooth, spin-trained, lifelong politician."

== Procedure ==
According to the Green Party's constitution, candidates must have been members of the party for three years or more at the close of nominations, and need to have signatures supporting their nomination from a minimum of twenty other party members. Elections are constitutionally mandated to take place every two years by a postal ballot of all members. The constitution states that nominations for leadership will be open from 10:00 on the first week-day in June until noon on the last week-day in June. Polls will close either after the last mail delivery on the last week-day of August, or five week-days before Autumn Conference starts, whichever is sooner. The party elects a leader and two deputy leaders, or two co-leaders and a single deputy leader. Several other executive positions were also chosen. Re-open nominations (RON) is included as a voting option. Votes are counted according to single transferable vote and alternative vote, as appropriate.

=== Timetable ===
On 20 May 2016, the party announced a provisional timetable for both the leadership and deputy leadership elections. Further details were announced on 27 May 2016. On 29 June 2016 it was announced that the close of nominations would be postponed from 12:00 to 22:00 on 30 June due to a technical problem.

- 1 June 2016 (10:00) – Nominations open
- 30 June 2016 (22:00) – Nominations close
- 1 July 2016 – Campaign period begins
- 24 July 2016 – Campaign period ends
- 25 July 2016 – One month balloting period begins
- 25 August 2016 – Balloting period ends
- 2 September 2016 – Autumn Conference begins in Birmingham; results are announced
- 4 September 2016 – Autumn Conference ends

== Campaign ==
=== Leadership ===
Caroline Lucas, who had been the party's first leader, announced that she was running on a joint ticket with the party's work and pensions spokesperson Jonathan Bartley. Bartley founded the think tank Ekklesia in 2002 and had run as a Green Party candidate since 2012. They campaigned on a platform of seeking a progressive alliance with other left-wing parties to achieve electoral reform. Matt Townsend, a party executive member, expressed concern that Lucas's early entry into the contest would lead it to become a "coronation", as did other party commentators. He said that Lucas's candidacy would mean other plausible candidates would choose not to run.

The activist Simon Cross ran on a platform of increasing taxes progressively. Clive Lord was a longstanding activist who had joined the PEOPLE Party, a direct predecessor of the Green Party, in 1973. He said he was running because Andrew Cooper wasn't. He criticised proposals for a progressive alliance, noting the rejection of the idea by the Labour leader Jeremy Corbyn. David Malone, a documentary maker, ran on a platform of increasing the party's emphasis on economics. Martie Warin, a parish councillor for the party, described himself as an ecosocialist and advocated improving the party's links with trades unions. David Williams was a former Labour councillor who had defected to the Green Party who was the leader of the Green group on Oxfordshire County Council. He said he supported Lucas but wanted to avoid a coronation.

=== Deputy leadership ===
The party's incumbent deputy leaders, Shahrar Ali and Amelia Womack both sought re-election. Ali was an academic who focused his campaign on accountability and his skill at public speaking. Womack was the party's culture, media and sport spokesperson seen as on the party's "pragmatic left". Kat Boettge was a town councillor and former chair of the East Midlands Green Party who said her migrant background would "send a powerful message" following the UK's vote to leave the European Union. Alan Borgars ran opposing the prospect of a progressive alliance with other parties. Andrew Cooper was a councillor who had served since 1999. He was seen as more environmentally focused than other candidates. Störm Poorun advocated the party becoming more diverse, and the Bristol City Councillor Daniella Radice cited her experience as a former deputy mayor.

== Candidates ==
=== Leadership candidates ===
Candidate		Political office	
Jonathan Bartley	Caroline Lucas	Work and pensions spokesperson	MP for Brighton Pavilion (since 2010); Leader of the Green Party (2008–2012)
Simon Cross			
Clive Lord			
David Malone			
Martie Warin		Easington parish councillor	
David Williams		Oxfordshire County Councillor (2012–2021); Oxford City Councillor (2006–2014)	

=== Deputy leadership candidates ===
Candidate	Political office
Shahrar Ali	Home affairs spokesperson Deputy leader (2014–2016)
Kat Boettge	
Alan Borgars	
Andrew Cooper	Energy spokesperson Kirklees Councillor (1999–present)
Störm Poorun	
Amelia Womack	Deputy leader (2014–2016)

== Result ==
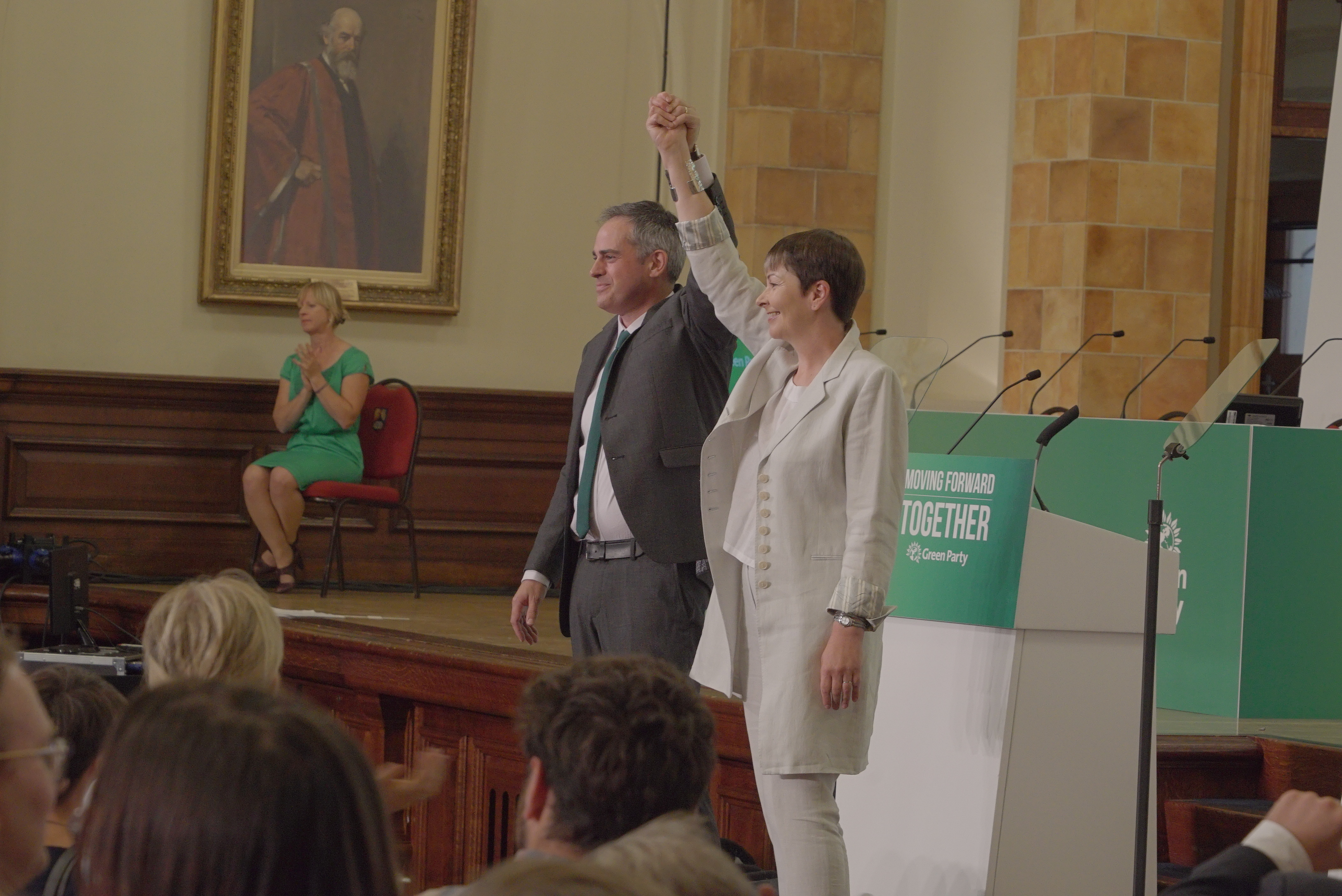
Lucas and Bartley after the results were declared.

Jonathan Bartley and Caroline Lucas won the leadership contest with 86.0% of first preference votes, on an increased turnout from the previous leadership election and the previous contested leadership election. Womack was re-elected as deputy leader. The two said the joint election showed the party was "not bound by tradition". The party says co-leadership is "a first in Westminster politics". Amelia Womack was elected as sole deputy leader.

=== Leader ===
Candidate	Votes	%
Jonathan Bartley and Caroline Lucas	13,570	86.9%
David Malone	956	6.1%
David Williams	527	3.3%
Re-open nominations	306	1.9%
Clive Lord	173	1.1%
Martie Warin	133	0.8%
Simon Cross	108	0.7%
Turnout	15,773	29.8%

=== Deputy leader ===
Candidate	First round		Second round		Third round		Fourth round	
Candidate	Votes	%	Votes	%	Votes	%	Votes	%
Amelia Womack	4,742	41.8%	4,882	43.7%	5,231	47.5%	6,063	57.1%
Andrew Cooper	1,778	15.7%	1,859	16.7%	1,979	18.0%	2,308	21.7%
Shahrar Ali	1,716	15.1%	1,820	16.3%	1,948	17.7%	2,244	21.1%
Kat Boettge	1,510	13.3%	1,623	14.5%	1,845	16.8	Eliminated	
Daniella Radice	924	8.2%	983	8.8%	Eliminated			
Störm Poorun	445	3.9%	Eliminated					
Alan Borgars	179	1.6%	Eliminated					
Re-open nominations	44	0.4%	Eliminated					

== Aftermath ==
Caroline Lucas thanked Natalie Bennett and said the party had "reached more people than ever before" under her leadership. The co-leaders said their joint election showed "the power of working together and the importance of striking a healthy balance between work and family and other commitments". Lucas told the BBC later that the job-share sent a political message about "doing politics differently" but it had also been "a very practical decision". In an acceptance speech delivered together, Lucas and Bartley called for the Greens to form "progressive alliances" with like-minded parties. Lucas has previously floated the idea of a loose electoral pact with other parties on the left of British politics, including Labour, which would see them give Green candidates a clear run in constituencies where they were best placed to challenge the Conservatives and vice versa. Bartley said the current first-past-the-post voting system for general elections was "redundant" and it was wrong that while more than a million people in England and Wales voted Green in 2015, it only had one MP, "we are resolute in wanting to explore the potential for progressive alliances with other parties that will deliver fair votes and will deliver more elected Greens that ever before".

== See also ==
- 2016 Conservative Party leadership election
- 2016 Labour Party leadership election (UK)
- UK Independence Party leadership election, 2016
