= David Malone (independent filmmaker) =

British filmmaker (born 1962)

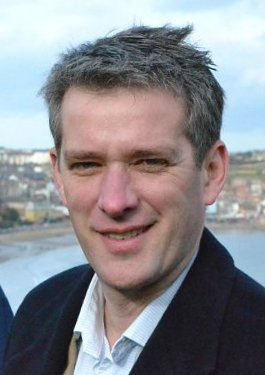
- Malone in 2016
- Born: March 1962 (age 64); North Shields, Northumberland, England
- Other name: Golem XIV (online pseudonym)
- Education: Swarthmore College
- Occupations: Independent filmmaker, author and politician
- Television: Horizon
- Political party: Green Party of England and Wales
- Parent: Adrian Malone

David Hugh Malone (born March 1962) is a British independent filmmaker, Green Party politician, and author of The Debt Generation. He has directed television documentaries on philosophy, science and religion, originally broadcast in the United Kingdom by the BBC and Channel 4.

Malone lives in Scarborough, North Yorkshire, and was the Green Party's parliamentary candidate for Scarborough and Whitby in the 2015 and 2017 general elections.

== Documentary career ==
David Malone was born in North Shields and grew up in 1970s London. His father, Adrian Malone, was also a documentary filmmaker, who produced The Ascent of Man with Jacob Bronowski and directed Cosmos: A Personal Voyage with Carl Sagan. Malone spent nine years in America and studied biological anthropology at Swarthmore College in Pennsylvania before joining the BBC Science Department and working there for nine years. He ended up joining the production team for Horizon, a regular documentary series on science and philosophy.

Malone then left and started his own documentary company, I-330 Films, and moved to North Yorkshire. I-330 Films was set up in 1995 by David Malone and his brother James Malone. Malone was also listed as one of three Directors of becauseyouthink.tv, alongside David Paterson and Jan Klimkowski. Malone's Testing God was shortlisted for the Royal Television Society's best documentary series award in 2002. He is currently a member of the University of Bradford's Film and Media Professional Advisory Board, which ensures the courses and operations of the department remain up-to-date.

In 2016, Malone produced, directed, and co-presented the four-part documentary series Why Are We Here? The programmes followed Malone and his co-presenter Ard Louis as they met scientists and philosophers including Frank Wilczek, Roger Penrose, Gregory Chaitin, and Jane Goodall as they attempted to reconcile questions of meaning and purpose with science.

== Political career ==
In 2008 Malone began commenting on the financial pages of The Guardian's website about the credit crunch and the ensuing financial crisis under the pseudonym Golem XIV, the name of a military supercomputer in a novel of the same name by the Polish science fiction writer Stanisław Lem. Malone became a fierce critic of the bank bailouts arguing that they would lead to massive cuts in public spending. In November 2010 his book about the crisis, The Debt Generation, was published in the UK by Level Press. It had been edited by Mark Tanner from the different writings he had done in The Guardian's comments section, which had totaled 600 pages of material. In 2013 he was also interviewed over his book by Ross Ashcroft on his 'Renegade Economist' talk show.

Malone has stood for election several times at various levels in Scarborough as a Green Party candidate:

- 2009 County Council election, in Falsgrave and Stepney division, coming third with 21% of the vote
- 2011 Scarborough Borough Council election, stood in Falsgrave ward coming fourth with 11% of the vote.
- 2013 County Council election, in Falsgrave and Stepney division, coming fourth with 17% of the vote.
- 2015 general election, in Scarborough and Whitby, coming fourth with 4.6% of the vote, 2,185 votes.
- 2015 Scarborough Borough Council election, in Stepney Ward.
- 2017 County Council election, in Falsgrave and Stepney division, coming second with 32% of the vote.
- 2017 general election, in Scarborough and Whitby, coming fifth with 1.8% of the vote, 915 votes.

In 2016, Malone stood in the Green Party leadership election, following the announcement that incumbent leader Natalie Bennett would not be standing. He was running his campaign to encourage the party to focus more on finance and economics. During the campaign, he attended hustings and gave interviews to various news outlets covering the election. Left Foot Forward speculated that "he is likely to win the support of many not backing the Bartley-Lucas ticket" and "to come in the top three." Voting took place from 25 July to 25 August, and the result was announced on 2 September at the party's Autumn Conference. The result was a victory for Jonathan Bartley and Caroline Lucas, who won as a job share candidacy with 86% of the vote. Malone came second with 956 votes, which equated to 6.1% of the vote.

== Works ==
=== Books ===
- The Debt Generation (edited by Mark Tanner, Level Press, York: 2010), ISBN 0956690203

=== Documentaries ===
- Fossil Heroes (for the BBC's Horizon; 1992)
- Wot U Lookin' At? (for Horizon; 1993)
- The Far Side - a 30th anniversary special (for Horizon; 1994)
- Death Wish: The Untold Story (for Horizon; 1994)
- Icon Earth (for Horizon; 1995)
- Tibet: The Ice Mother (for Horizon; 1995)
- Inside the Internet (for the BBC's Computers Don't Bite; 1997)
- The Flow of Time (1999)
- Secrets of the Incas (2000)
- Testing God (2001), in three episodes:
  Killing the Creator
  Darwin and the Divine
  Credo Ergo Sum
- Soul Searching (2003), in two episodes:
  Know Thyself
  The Undiscovered Country
- What We Still Don't Know (2004), in three episodes:
  Are We Alone?
  Why Are We Here?
  Are We Real?
- Stems Cells: The Promise (2005)
- Voices In My Head (2006)
- Dangerous Knowledge (2007)
- High Anxieties: The Mathematics of Chaos (2008)
- The Secret Life of Waves (2011)
- Heart vs Mind: What Makes Us Human? (2012)
- Metamorphosis: The Science of Change (2013)
- Why are we here? (2016), in 4 episodes:
  Meaning Seeking Beings
  The Reality of Ideas
  The Animal Within
  The Moral Compass
- Did Covid Leak from a Lab in China? (2022)
