= 2003 Scarborough Borough Council election =

UK local government election

Elections to Scarborough Borough Council in North Yorkshire, England, were held on 1 May 2003. The whole council was up for election with boundary changes since the last election in 1999 increasing the number of seats by one. The Conservative Party gained control of the council from no overall control.

== Election result ==
Scarborough local election result 2003
Party	Seats	Gains	Losses	Net gain/loss	Seats %	Votes %	Votes	+/−
Conservative	27			+7	54.0	41.1	15,675	
Independent	13			0	26.0	26.9	10,243	
Labour	8			−3	16.0	17.4	6,624	
Liberal Democrats	2			−3	4.0	12.7	4,851	
Green	0			0	0	1.5	586	
Socialist Alliance	0			0	0	0.4	156	

8 Conservative candidates were uncontested.

== Ward results ==
Castle (2)
Party	Candidate	Votes	%	±%
Independent	Janet Jefferson	627		
Conservative	Thomas Fox	315		
Labour	Michelle Andrew	277		
Conservative	Timothy Bates	113		
Green	Ann Willerton	100		
Liberal Democrats	Andrew Doig	95		
Socialist Alliance	Susan Ram	34		
Turnout		1,561	28	

Cayton (2)
Party	Candidate	Votes	%	±%
Conservative	John Blackburn	882		
Conservative	Mary Preston	765		
Labour	Eileen Vickers	508		
Turnout		2,155	38	

Central (2)
Party	Candidate	Votes	%	±%
Labour	David Billing	366		
Labour	Eric Broadbent	307		
Liberal Democrats	Gillian Hopkinson	248		
Conservative	Malcom Fletcher	179		
Turnout		1,100	21	

Danby
Party	Candidate	Votes	%	±%
Conservative	William Tindall	uncontested		

Derwent Valley (2)
Party	Candidate	Votes	%	±%
Conservative	Peter Bull	uncontested		
Conservative	David Jeffels	uncontested		

Eastfield (3)
Party	Candidate	Votes	%	±%
Liberal Democrats	Brian O'Flynn	538		
Labour	Brian Simpson	363		
Labour	Stanley Pearson	324		
Liberal Democrats	John Bland	303		
Independent	Frederick Edwards	159		
Turnout		1,687	21	

Esk Valley (2)
Party	Candidate	Votes	%	±%
Conservative	Thomas Miller	uncontested		
Conservative	James Preston	uncontested		

Falsgrave Park (2)
Party	Candidate	Votes	%	±%
Independent	Timothy Drake	375		
Labour	Alan Oxley	292		
Labour	Ian Stubbs	284		
Conservative	David Barker	214		
Conservative	Doreen Madden	195		
Green	John Marsden	130		
Socialist Alliance	David Gordon	90		
Socialist Alliance	Dave Welsh	32		
Turnout		1,612	28	

Filey (3)
Party	Candidate	Votes	%	±%
Independent	Colin Haddington	1,020		
Conservative	Freda Coultas	793		
Conservative	Rodney Cartwright	712		
Conservative	James Barron	685		
Independent	John Spencer	453		
Labour	Patricia Marsburg	428		
Turnout		4,091	34	

Fylingdales
Party	Candidate	Votes	%	±%
Conservative	Jane Mortimer	uncontested		

Hertford (2)
Party	Candidate	Votes	%	±%
Conservative	Godfrey Allanson	700		
Conservative	Christopher Collier-Woods	586		
Liberal Democrats	Julie Dower	571		
Turnout		1,857	30	

Lindhead
Party	Candidate	Votes	%	±%
Conservative	Graham Backhouse	584	61.6	
Liberal Democrats	Michael Pitts	310	32.7	
Independent	Gary Hill	54	5.7	
Majority		274	28.9	
Turnout		948	55	

Mayfield (2)
Party	Candidate	Votes	%	±%
Conservative	Jane Kenyon	603		
Conservative	Peter Booth	469		
Labour	Dalton Peake	458		
Labour	David Pybus	360		
Liberal Democrats	Heather Coughlan	341		
Independent	Ian Bryan	88		
Turnout		2,319	33.9	

Mulgrave (2)
Party	Candidate	Votes	%	±%
Conservative	Beryl Christon	uncontested		
Conservative	Marie Harland	uncontested		

Newby (3)
Party	Candidate	Votes	%	±%
Independent	Brian Watson	945		
Independent	Cecil Ridley	767		
Independent	Hazel Lynskey	668		
Liberal Democrats	James Martin	615		
Conservative	John Grace	455		
Conservative	Jennifer Kelly	406		
Turnout		3,856	33	

North Bay (2)
Party	Candidate	Votes	%	±%
Conservative	Eric Smith	339		
Conservative	Michael Kelly	332		
Labour	Dorothy Hurrell	261		
Independent	John Pindar	232		
Liberal Democrats	Christopher Walker	230		
Turnout		1,394	24	

Northstead (2)
Party	Candidate	Votes	%	±%
Independent	Peter Popple	543		
Independent	Norman Murphy	490		
Labour	Lynne Broadbent	287		
Labour	Janet Hill	243		
Conservative	Bonnie Purchon	188		
Conservative	Andrew Leak	153		
Turnout		1,904	33	

Ramshill (2)
Party	Candidate	Votes	%	±%
Labour	John Warburton	408		
Conservative	Kathleen Johnson	378		
Conservative	Heather Phillips	320		
Turnout		1,106	24	

Scalby, Hackness and Staintondale (2)
Party	Candidate	Votes	%	±%
Conservative	Derek Bastiman	693		
Independent	Sheila Kettlewell	683		
Independent	Charles White	672		
Conservative	John Flinton	457		
Liberal Democrats	Margaret Pitts	244		
Turnout		2,749	45	

Seamer (2)
Party	Candidate	Votes	%	±%
Conservative	Helen Mallory	596		
Conservative	Lucy Haycock	590		
Liberal Democrats	Richard Creasey	514		
Turnout		1,700	31	

Stepney (2)
Party	Candidate	Votes	%	±%
Conservative	Christina Davenport	366		
Labour	John Ritchie	344		
Labour	Andrew Sharp	342		
Conservative	Edward Sulman	336		
Independent	Frank Wright	283		
Green	Dilys Cluer	181		
Green	Jonathan Dixon	175		
Turnout		2,027	31	

Streonshalh (2)
Party	Candidate	Votes	%	±%
Liberal Democrats	Robert Broadley	604		
Independent	Sandra Turner	485		
Conservative	Edward Noble	148		
Turnout		1,237	22.1	

Weaponness (2)
Party	Candidate	Votes	%	±%
Conservative	Eileen Bosomworth	503		
Independent	Penny Marsden	467		
Conservative	William Woodroffe	432		
Liberal Democrats	Duncan Grant	238		
Labour	Colin Shrive	186		
Turnout		1,826	34	

Whitby West Cliff (2)
Party	Candidate	Votes	%	±%
Conservative	Joseph Plant	575		
Independent	Dorothy Clegg	522		
Conservative	Barry Truman	393		
Turnout		1,490	27.3	

Woodlands (2)
Party	Candidate	Votes	%	±%
Independent	William Chatt	472		
Labour	Ernest Bairstow	317		
Labour	Mary Budda	269		
Independent	Christopher Phillips	238		
Conservative	Mark Gay	220		
Turnout		1,516	27	
