= 2011 Scarborough Borough Council election =

2011 UK local government election

Elections to Scarborough Borough Council were held on 5 May 2011. The whole council was up for election.

== Election result ==
Scarborough local election result 2011
Party	Seats	Gains	Losses	Net gain/loss	Seats %	Votes %	Votes	+/−
Conservative								
Independent								
Liberal Democrats								
Labour								
Green								
Liberal								
National Front								

== Ward results ==
Castle (2)
Party	Candidate	Votes	%	±%
Independent	Janet Jefferson*	778	69.9	+3.9
Labour	Colin Challen	433	38.9	+13.0
Conservative	Ros Fox*	306	27.5	−2.3
Conservative	Mark Chamberlain	167	15.0	N/A
Turnout		1,113	33	
Independent hold		Swing		
Labour gain from Conservative		Swing		

Cayton (2)
Party	Candidate	Votes	%	±%
Conservative	John Blackburn*	862	53.0	−15.4
Independent	Simon Green	652	40.1	N/A
Conservative	Roberta Swiers	620	38.2	−17.1
Labour	James Brace	359	22.1	N/A
Liberal Democrats	Barry Pearson	175	10.8	N/A
Turnout		1,625	46	
Conservative hold		Swing		
Independent gain from Conservative		Swing		

Central (2)
Party	Candidate	Votes	%	±%
Labour	David Billing*	350	39.0	+7.5
Labour	Eric Broadbent*	304	33.9	+4.7
Liberal Democrats	Malcolm Short	267	29.7	+2.9
Independent	Christine Mark	161	17.9	N/A
Conservative	Alan Baud	155	17.3	−3.1
Independent	Garry Unsworth	128	14.3	N/A
Green	Christopher Phillips	111	12.4	−4.6
National Front	Trisha Scott	56	6.2	−8.4
Turnout		898	26	
Labour hold		Swing		
Labour hold		Swing		

Danby (1)
Party	Candidate	Votes	%	±%
Conservative	Herbert Tindall*	632	71.7	+71.7
Labour	Janet Peake	249	28.3	N/A
Turnout		893	50	
Conservative hold		Swing		

Derwent Valley (2)
Party	Candidate	Votes	%	±%
Conservative	David Jeffels*	1,072	58.4	+6.1
Independent	Michael Jay-Hanmer*	817	44.5	−0.7
Conservative	Heather Phillips	621	33.8	−9.3
Liberal Democrats	Robert Lockwood	411	22.4	+5.0
Turnout		1,837	50	
Conservative hold		Swing		
Independent hold		Swing		

Eastfield (3)
Party	Candidate	Votes	%	±%
Liberal Democrats	Brian Simpson*	468	48.6	−13.8
Liberal Democrats	Geoffrey Evans*	358	37.2	−10.8
Liberal Democrats	Johan Zegstroo*	356	37.0	−34.5
Labour	John White	272	28.2	+7.0
Labour	Tracey White	260	27.0	+7.1
Labour	John Warburton	240	24.9	N/A
Independent	Carole Gerada	107	11.1	N/A
Independent	Gavin Barker	97	10.1	N/A
Conservative	Michael Kelly	91	9.4	−5.3
Conservative	Deborah Fox	81	8.4	−3.8
Turnout		963	24	
Liberal Democrats hold		Swing		
Liberal Democrats hold		Swing		
Liberal Democrats hold		Swing		

Esk Valley (2)
Party	Candidate	Votes	%	±%
Conservative	Tim Lawn*	1,183	67.3	+2.0
Conservative	James Preston*	928	52.8	−1.2
Independent	Brian Crinion	417	23.7	+4.3
Labour	Dalton Peake	379	21.6	N/A
Turnout		1,757	50	
Conservative hold		Swing		
Conservative hold		Swing		

Falsgrave Park (2)
Party	Candidate	Votes	%	±%
Independent	Patricia Marsburg*	480	39.5	−5.5
Labour	John Ritchie	464	38.2	−6.8
Conservative	Jennifer Kelly	247	20.3	−5.1
Green	David Malone	212	17.4	−3.4
Independent	Stuart Swan	189	15.6	N/A
Liberal Democrats	Kevin Riley*	147	12.1	−17.0
Independent	Andy Ellis	113	9.3	−8.7
Turnout		1,215	33	
Independent gain from Liberal Democrats		Swing		
Labour hold		Swing		

Filey (3)
Party	Candidate	Votes	%	±%
Independent	Mike Cockerill*	1,281	65.9	+13.1
Independent	Sam Cross*	1,078	55.5	+13.0
Conservative	Colin Haddington*	1,015	52.2	+8.0
Independent	Keith Wood	396	20.4	N/A
Turnout		1,943	36	
Independent hold		Swing		
Independent hold		Swing		
Conservative hold		Swing		

Fylingdales (1)
Party	Candidate	Votes	%	±%
Conservative	Jane Mortimer*	561	71.6	+5.7
Labour	Judith Dennett	223	28.4	N/A
Turnout		795	46	
Conservative hold		Swing		

Hertford (2)
Party	Candidate	Votes	%	±%
Green	Nick Harvey*	1,192	66.9	+34.1
Conservative	Godfrey Allanson*	902	50.6	+3.3
Conservative	Melissa MacDonald	444	24.9	−20.9
Labour	Andrew Sharp	287	16.1	N/A
Turnout		1,781	44	
Green gain from Conservative		Swing		
Conservative hold		Swing		

Lindhead (1)
Party	Candidate	Votes	%	±%
Conservative	Andrew Backhouse*	699	77.3	+13.1
Labour	Joanne Watson	107	11.8	N/A
Independent	Debby McDonald	98	10.8	N/A
Turnout		914	49	
Conservative hold		Swing		

Mayfield (2)
Party	Candidate	Votes	%	±%
Conservative	Jane Kenyon*	735	50.7	+50.7
Conservative	David Chance	602	41.5	+41.5
Labour	Ellie Whitehead	569	39.2	N/A
Green	Tricia Griffin	310	21.4	N/A
Turnout		1,451	39	
Conservative hold		Swing		
Conservative hold		Swing		

Mulgrave (2)
Party	Candidate	Votes	%	±%
Conservative	Marie Harland*	701	58.9	+14.1
Independent	John Armsby*	628	52.7	−1.4
Labour	Diane Jeuda	287	24.1	N/A
Turnout		1,191	42	
Conservative hold		Swing		
Independent hold		Swing		

Newby (3)
Party	Candidate	Votes	%	±%
Independent	Mick Cooper	842	36.8	N/A
Independent	Brian Watson*	841	36.8	−15.8
Conservative	Andrew Jenkinson	720	31.5	−2.3
Conservative	Hazel Lynskey*	696	30.4	−7.8
Independent	Cecil Ridley*	676	29.6	−13.3
Conservative	Susan Backhouse	638	27.9	N/A
Labour	Paul McLean	516	22.6	−2.0
Green	Amanda Nunns	328	14.3	−3.6
Liberal Democrats	Liz Black	288	12.6	N/A
Turnout		2,286	44	
Independent hold		Swing		
Independent gain from Independent		Swing		
Conservative hold		Swing		

North Bay (2)
Party	Candidate	Votes	%	±%
Labour	Subash Sharma	375	32.7	N/A
Conservative	Martin Smith	346	30.1	−7.0
Independent	Bonnie Purchon*	323	28.1	−13.0
Independent	Guy Smith*	291	25.3	−13.6
Conservative	Teddy Sulman	253	22.0	−8.3
Green	Norman Oldham	144	12.5	−10.1
Liberal Democrats	Bill Black	109	9.5	N/A
Turnout		1,148	33	
Labour gain from Independent		Swing		
Conservative gain from Independent		Swing		

Northstead (2)
Party	Candidate	Votes	%	±%
Independent	Peter Popple*	590	46.9	−14.5
Independent	Norman Murphy*	445	35.3	−7.9
Labour	Carl Maw	429	34.1	+13.9
Conservative	Angela Micklethwaite-Morris	253	20.1	−6.5
Conservative	Peter Toolan	251	19.9	N/A
Green	Kate White	138	11.0	−9.4
Liberal Democrats	Alix Bartlett-Cook	94	7.5	N/A
Turnout		1,259	40	
Independent hold		Swing		
Independent hold		Swing		

Ramshill (2)
Party	Candidate	Votes	%	±%
Independent	Amanda Robinson	368	32.9	N/A
Conservative	Nick Brown	350	31.3	+0.1
Conservative	Stuart Walker	323	28.9	−1.3
Labour	Thomas Creasey	301	26.9	N/A
Liberal Democrats	Svetlana Rodgers*	260	23.2	−10.9
Green	Mark Vesey	232	20.7	−5.0
Turnout		1,119	34	
Independent gain from Liberal Democrats		Swing		
Conservative hold		Swing		

Scalby, Hackness and Staintondale (2)
Party	Candidate	Votes	%	±%
Conservative	Derek Bastiman*	1,097	59.9	+0.8
Conservative	John Flinton*	931	50.8	+3.5
Independent	Richard Thompson	467	25.5	N/A
Green	Geoffrey Marsden-Jones	343	18.7	+3.4
Liberal	Magnus Johnson	335	18.3	N/A
Turnout		1,831	54	
Conservative hold		Swing		
Conservative hold		Swing		

Seamer (2)
Party	Candidate	Votes	%	±%
Conservative	Helen Mallory*	662	42.7	−2.1
Independent	Roxanne Murphy	525	33.8	−6.0
Conservative	Thomas McGrory	478	30.8	−11.1
Independent	David Raine	387	25.0	N/A
Liberal Democrats	Bob Jackman	294	19.0	−7.7
Green	Mick Cutler	215	13.9	N/A
Turnout		1,551	42	
Conservative hold		Swing		
Independent gain from Conservative		Swing		

Stepney (2)
Party	Candidate	Votes	%	±%
Green	Dilys Cluer*	473	33.4	−3.3
Conservative	Lynn Bastiman	399	28.2	+4.1
Independent	Kevin Allen	375	26.5	N/A
Labour	Michelle Andrew	298	21.0	+5.2
Green	Robert Nicholls	259	18.3	−33.2
Independent	Tony Snow	222	15.7	N/A
Labour	Edna Oxley	207	14.6	+0.7
Liberal Democrats	Gareth Franks	138	9.7	−8.3
Turnout		1,416	41	
Green hold		Swing		
Conservative gain from Green		Swing		

Streonshalh (2)
Party	Candidate	Votes	%	±%
Conservative	Sandra Turner*	394	38.3	+8.2
Conservative	Dorothy Clegg*	335	32.5	−18.5
Labour	Noreen Wilson	302	29.3	N/A
Labour	Simon Parkes	277	26.9	N/A
Independent	Ian Havelock	200	19.4	N/A
Independent	Kenneth Graham	170	16.5	N/A
Independent	John Dickinson	145	14.1	N/A
Independent	Richard Ineson	53	5.1	N/A
Turnout		1,030	29	
Conservative gain from Liberal Democrats		Swing		
Conservative gain from Independent		Swing		

Weaponness (2)
Party	Candidate	Votes	%	±%
Conservative	Penny Marsden*	774	52.5	−3.5
Conservative	Thomas Fox*	747	50.7	+7.3
Independent	John Bradley	335	22.7	N/A
Independent	Sean Hunter	332	22.5	N/A
Labour	Colin Barnes	260	17.7	N/A
Green	Judy Deans	201	13.6	N/A
Turnout		1,473	49	
Conservative gain from Independent		Swing		
Conservative hold		Swing		

Whitby West Cliff (2)
Party	Candidate	Votes	%	±%
Conservative	Joseph Plant*	648	50.2	−14.4
Conservative	Alf Abbott	512	39.7	−3.4
Independent	Mike Ward*	321	24.9	−20.6
Labour	Geoffrey Wilson	289	22.4	N/A
Labour	Gerald Dennett	265	20.5	N/A
Green	Wynne Jones	172	13.3	N/A
Turnout		1,290	40	
Conservative hold		Swing		
Conservative gain from Independent		Swing		

Woodlands (2)
Party	Candidate	Votes	%	±%
Independent	William Chatt*	522	43.6	−7.1
Labour	Steve Bairstow	519	43.4	+4.8
Independent	Phil McDonald*	312	26.1	−12.5
Conservative	Josephine O'Leary	241	20.1	−5.3
Conservative	Peter Southward	209	17.5	N/A
Green	Sarah Priestley	114	9.5	−9.3
Liberal Democrats	Andrew Leak	97	8.1	N/A
Turnout		1,197	36	
Independent hold		Swing		
Labour hold		Swing		
