= 2019 Scarborough Borough Council election =

2019 election in Scarborough Borough in England

Map of the results

The 2019 Scarborough Borough Council election took place on 2 May 2019 to elect members of the Scarborough Borough Council in England. It was held on the same day as other local elections.

While the Conservative Party remained the largest party on the council, they lost their majority, and thereby control of the council. In the aftermath of the election, a new administration led by the Labour Party, with support from the Green Party and a number of independent councillors, was formed; this administration would hold control of the council until its dissolution and replacement by the unitary North Yorkshire Council in 2023.

== Results summary ==
2019 Scarborough Borough Council election
Party	Seats	Gains	Losses	Net gain/loss	Seats %	Votes %	Votes	+/−
Conservative	16	1	4	▼10	34.8	26.3	14,455	-9.9
Labour	14	3	2	Steady	30.4	25.7	14,153	+4.4
Independent	13	6	0	▲10	28.3	25.6	14,078	+19.3
Green	2	0	0	Steady	4.3	10.0	5,504	+1.8
UKIP	1	1	5	▼4	2.2	10.3	5,645	-13.5
Liberal Democrats	0	0	0	Steady	0.0	2.0	1,093	-2.3
Yorkshire	0	0	0	Steady	0.0	0.2	136	New

== Ward results ==
=== Burniston & Cloughton ===
Burniston & Cloughton
Party	Candidate	Votes	%	±%
Conservative	Andrew Backhouse*	356	52.4	
Labour	Moira Cunningham	182	26.8	
UKIP	Beverley Kristensen	142	20.9	
Rejected ballots		9		
Majority				
Turnout		689	39.4	
Conservative win (new seat)				

=== Castle ===
Castle
Party	Candidate	Votes	%	±%
Independent	Janet Jefferson*	997	62.0	
Labour	Carl Maw*	571	35.5	
Labour	Alex Bailey	568	35.3	
Green	David King	432	26.9	
UKIP	Deirdre Abbott	343	21.3	
Conservative	Anthony Gibson	229	14.3	
Rejected ballots		3		
Majority				
Turnout		1,607	29.4	
Independent win (new seat)				
Labour win (new seat)				
Labour win (new seat)				

=== Cayton ===
Cayton
Party	Candidate	Votes	%	±%
Conservative	Roberta Swiers*	601	54.3	
Conservative	Simon Green*	559	50.5	
Labour	Colin Barnes	435	39.3	
Rejected ballots		59		
Majority				
Turnout		1,107	31.6	
Conservative win (new seat)				
Conservative win (new seat)				

=== Danby & Mulgrave ===
Danby & Mulgrave
Party	Candidate	Votes	%	±%
Conservative	Clive Pearson*	718	45.5	
Conservative	Marion Watson*	593	37.6	
Green	Margaret Jackson	380	24.1	
Labour	Amanda Daynes	363	23.0	
Independent	Hero Sumner	305	19.3	
UKIP	Adrian Clarkson	246	15.6	
UKIP	Sandra Gibson	177	11.2	
Rejected ballots		3		
Majority				
Turnout		1,577	39.3	
Conservative win (new seat)				
Conservative win (new seat)				

=== Derwent Valley & Moor ===
Derwent Valley & Moor
Party	Candidate	Votes	%	±%
Conservative	David Jeffels*	727	42.8	
Conservative	Heather Phillips*	583	34.4	
Green	Magnus Johnson	445	26.2	
Liberal Democrats	Robert Lockwood	339	20.0	
Labour	David Billing*	309	18.2	
UKIP	Phil Spruce	256	15.1	
Independent	Frank Wright	246	14.5	
Rejected ballots		2		
Majority				
Turnout		1,697	42.2	
Conservative win (new seat)				
Conservative win (new seat)				

=== Eastfield ===
Eastfield
Party	Candidate	Votes	%	±%
Labour	Tony Randerson*	616	62.3	
Labour	Joanne Maw	452	45.7	
Labour	Theresa Norton	410	41.5	
UKIP	Paul McCann	307	31.1	
Conservative	John White	202	20.4	
Majority				
Turnout		988	22.8	
Labour win (new seat)				
Labour win (new seat)				
Labour win (new seat)				

=== Esk Valley ===
Esk Valley
Party	Candidate	Votes	%	±%
Conservative	Guy Coulson*	813	61.3	
Conservative	Phil Trumper*	597	45.0	
Labour	Peter Bolton	383	28.9	
UKIP	Philip Michulitis	233	17.6	
Rejected ballots		19		
Majority				
Turnout		1,327	36.3	
Conservative win (new seat)				
Conservative win (new seat)				

=== Falsgrave & Stepney ===
Falsgrave & Stepney
Party	Candidate	Votes	%	±%
Green	Neil Robinson	856	40.9	
Green	Will Forbes	822	39.2	
Labour	Liz Colling*	753	35.9	
Labour	Mark Gordon	703	33.6	
UKIP	Sally Longden	485	23.2	
Independent	Colin Relph	466	22.2	
Independent	Sean Hunter	321	15.3	
Conservative	Tracey Reeves	252	12.0	
Conservative	Richard Thompson	247	11.8	
Liberal Democrats	Alix Cook	221	10.5	
Rejected ballots		4		
Majority				
Turnout		2,095	33.8	
Green win (new seat)				
Green win (new seat)				
Labour win (new seat)				

=== Filey ===
Filey
Party	Candidate	Votes	%	±%
Independent	Sam Cross*	890	43.2	
Independent	Mike Cockerill*	855	41.5	
Independent	John Casey	789	38.3	
Independent	Jacqui Houlden-Banks	788	38.3	
Independent	Colin Haddington*	553	26.9	
UKIP	Janice Robinson	402	19.5	
Labour	Bob Colling	332	16.1	
Conservative	Terry Parkinson	212	10.3	
Rejected ballots		21		
Majority				
Turnout		2,059	36.3	
Independent win (new seat)				
Independent win (new seat)				
Independent win (new seat)				

=== Fylingdales & Ravenscar ===
Fylingdales & Ravenscar
Party	Candidate	Votes	%	±%
Conservative	Jane Mortimer*	365	48.9	
Labour	Keith Jeffery	209	28.0	
UKIP	Stephen Mayall	173	23.2	
Rejected ballots		5		
Majority				
Turnout		752	40.1	
Conservative win (new seat)				

=== Hunmanby ===
Hunmanby
Party	Candidate	Votes	%	±%
Independent	Michelle Donohue-Moncrieff*	972	67.7	
Independent	Paul Riley	801	55.8	
Conservative	Godfrey Allanson*	421	29.3	
Conservative	Tom Seston	160	11.1	
Labour	Martin Whittle	158	11.0	
Majority				
Turnout		1,435	38.9	
Independent win (new seat)				
Independent win (new seat)				

=== Mayfield ===
Mayfield
Party	Candidate	Votes	%	±%
Conservative	Glenn Goodberry	517	49.1	
Conservative	David Chance*	416	39.5	
Labour	Asa Jones	339	32.2	
Labour	Gerald Dennett*	324	30.7	
UKIP	Aaron James	237	22.5	
Rejected ballots		8		
Majority				
Turnout		1,054	31.2	
Conservative win (new seat)				
Conservative win (new seat)				

=== Newby ===
Newby
Party	Candidate	Votes	%	±%
Independent	Eileen Murphy	860	46.0	
UKIP	Neil Heritage	594	31.8	
Labour	Subash Sharma	591	31.6	
Green	Helen Kindness	545	29.2	
Independent	Nick Henderson	541	28.9	
Conservative	Andrew Jenkinson*	464	24.8	
Conservative	Lynn Bastiman*	386	20.7	
Majority				
Turnout		1,869	37.8	
Independent win (new seat)				
UKIP win (new seat)				
Labour win (new seat)				

=== Northstead ===
Northstead
Party	Candidate	Votes	%	±%
Labour	Eric Broadbent*	624	34.6	
Independent	Guy Smith	616	34.2	
Independent	John Atkinson	602	33.4	
Independent	Norman Murphy*	553	30.7	
Labour	Yvonne Pattison	494	27.4	
UKIP	Tim Thorne	433	24.0	
Labour	Neil Price*	423	23.5	
Conservative	Martin Smith*	315	17.5	
Green	Gabrielle Naptali	313	17.4	
Majority				
Turnout		1,802	31.9	
Labour win (new seat)				
Independent win (new seat)				
Independent win (new seat)				

=== Scalby ===
Scalby
Party	Candidate	Votes	%	±%
Conservative	Hazel Lynskey*	516	40.6	
Conservative	Derek Bastiman*	495	38.9	
Green	Sara Fenander	424	33.3	
UKIP	Mark Harland	371	29.2	
Labour	Tina Davy	283	22.2	
Rejected ballots		5		
Majority				
Turnout		1,272	44.0	
Conservative win (new seat)				
Conservative win (new seat)				

=== Seamer ===
Seamer
Party	Candidate	Votes	%	±%
Independent	Roxanne Murphy*	537	43.0	
Conservative	Helen Mallory*	390	31.2	
Liberal Democrats	Bob Jackman	338	27.1	
UKIP	Zoe Sinclair	324	25.9	
Labour	Colin Challen	205	16.4	
Conservative	Mark Phillips	193	15.5	
Rejected ballots		5		
Majority				
Turnout		1,249	34.3	
Independent win (new seat)				
Conservative win (new seat)				

=== Streonshalh ===
Streonshalh
Party	Candidate	Votes	%	±%
Labour	Michael Stonehouse	377	41.3	
Labour	Stewart MacDonald	368	40.3	
Conservative	Sandra Turner*	315	34.5	
UKIP	Michael Harrison	273	29.9	
Conservative	Linda Wild	226	24.8	
Rejected ballots		8		
Majority				
Turnout		913	26.5	
Labour win (new seat)				
Labour win (new seat)				

=== Weaponness & Ramshill ===
Weaponness & Ramshill
Party	Candidate	Votes	%	±%
Independent	Jim Grieve	828	37.7	
Labour	Steve Siddons*	761	34.7	
Labour	Rich Maw	741	33.7	
Green	Charlotte Bonner	703	32.0	
Labour	Connor Young	590	26.9	
Conservative	Tom Fox*	573	26.1	
Conservative	Jennifer Kelly	511	23.3	
Conservative	Callum Walsh*	447	20.4	
UKIP	Stuart Abbott	395	18.0	
Rejected ballots		4		
Majority				
Turnout		2,196	38.3	
Independent win (new seat)				
Labour win (new seat)				
Labour win (new seat)				

=== Whitby West Cliff ===
Whitby West Cliff
Party	Candidate	Votes	%	±%
Labour	Sue Tucker	323	29.3	
Conservative	Alf Abbott*	317	28.7	
Conservative	John Nock*	254	23.0	
Independent	Mike Ward	229	20.7	
Green	Howard Green	196	17.8	
Liberal Democrats	Jonathan Harston	195	17.7	
Independent	Graham Collinson	170	15.4	
UKIP	Ken Hordon	154	13.9	
Yorkshire	Lee Derrick	136	12.3	
Rejected ballots		0		
Majority				
Turnout		1,104	33.1	
Labour win (new seat)				
Conservative win (new seat)				

=== Woodlands ===
Woodlands
Party	Candidate	Votes	%	±%
Independent	Phil Kershaw	714	43.5	
Independent	Bill Chatt*	690	42.1	
Independent	Peter Popple	583	35.5	
Labour	Andy Leak	437	26.6	
Labour	Richard Moody*	432	26.3	
Green	Chris Phillips	388	23.7	
Labour	Denise Sangster	370	22.6	
Conservative	Gareth Edmunds	282	17.2	
Conservative	Jack White	203	12.4	
Rejected ballots		10		
Majority				
Turnout		1,640	31.4	
Independent win (new seat)				
Independent win (new seat)				
Independent win (new seat)				

== Changes 2019–2023 ==
- May 2019: Labour councillor Steve Siddons became leader of the council and a Labour-led administration was formed with support from independent councillors.
- January 2020: Andrew Backhouse resigned from the Conservative Group and joined the Independent Group, while Michelle Donohue-Moncrieff resigned from the Independent Group and became an independent councillor.
- By May 2021: Jane Mortimer, elected as a Conservative councillor for Fylingdales & Ravenscar, was listed by the council as an independent councillor.
- 21 May 2021: Hazel Lynskey resigned from the Conservative Group and sat as an independent councillor.
- February 2022: David Chance, a Conservative councillor for Mayfield, resigned from the council, creating a vacancy.
- October 2022: Hazel Lynskey, the ward member for Scalby, died after a short illness, leaving a vacancy. The vacancy was not filled before the borough was dissolved on 1 April 2023.
- November 2022: Theresa Norton, formerly a member of the Labour Group, became an independent councillor.
- 1 April 2023: Scarborough Borough Council was abolished and its functions transferred to North Yorkshire Council, the new unitary authority for the county.

=== By-elections ===
==== Mayfield ====
Mayfield by-election, 31 March 2022
Party	Candidate	Votes	%	±%
Conservative	John Nock	268	45.8	
Labour	Gerald Dennett	142	24.3	
Independent	Linda Wild	122	20.9	
Yorkshire	Lee Derrick	53	9.1	
Rejected ballots		2	0.3	
Majority		126	21.5	
Turnout		585	16.2	
Conservative hold				

The by-election was triggered by the resignation of Conservative councillor David Chance, who had been elected for one of the two Mayfield seats at the 2019 election.
