= 2007 Scarborough Borough Council election =

2007 UK local government election

The 2007 Scarborough Borough Council elections to the Scarborough Borough Council were held on 3 May 2007. The whole council was up for election and the Conservative party lost overall control of the council to no overall control. Overall turnout was 36%.

== Election result ==
Scarborough local election result 2007
Party	Seats	Gains	Losses	Net gain/loss	Seats %	Votes %	Votes	+/−
Conservative	23	2	6	-4	46.0	39.7	20,436	-1.4%
Independent	15	5	3	+2	30.0	30.7	15,803	+3.8%
Liberal Democrats	6	4	0	+4	12.0	13.7	7,068	+1.0%
Labour	4	0	4	-4	8.0	6.1	3,127	-11.3%
Green	2	2	0	+2	4.0	7.5	3,866	+6.0%
BNP	0	0	0	0	0	1.5	798	+1.5%
Alliance for Green Socialism	0	0	0	0	0	0.5	250	+0.5%
North Yorkshire Coast Party	0	0	0	0	0	0.3	138	+0.3%

3 Conservative candidates were uncontested.

== Ward results ==
Castle (2)
Party	Candidate	Votes	%	±%
Independent	Janet Jefferson	677	66.0	
Conservative	Rosalyn Fox	306	29.8	
Green	Jason Mullen	282	27.5	
Labour	Michelle Andrew	266	25.9	
Green	Peter Redwood	127	12.4	
Turnout		1,028	32	
Independent hold		Swing		
Conservative hold		Swing		

Cayton (2)
Party	Candidate	Votes	%	±%
Conservative	John Blackburn	944	68.4	
Conservative	Mary Preston	764	55.3	
Independent	Henry Rowlands	598	43.3	
Turnout		1,394	39	
Conservative hold		Swing		
Conservative hold		Swing		

Central (2)
Party	Candidate	Votes	%	±%
Labour	David Billing	259	31.5	
Labour	Eric Broadbent	240	29.2	
Liberal Democrats	Gillian Hopkinson	220	26.8	
Conservative	Nicholas Henderson	168	20.4	
Independent	Alison Lee	158	19.2	
Liberal Democrats	Christopher Walker	141	17.2	
Green	Sarah Priestley	140	17.0	
BNP	Patricia Scott	120	14.6	
Turnout		823	25	
Labour hold		Swing		
Labour hold		Swing		

Danby (1)
Party	Candidate	Votes	%	±%
Conservative	Herbert Tindall	Unopposed	N/A	±0.0
Turnout		Uncontested	N/A	
Conservative hold		Swing		

Derwent Valley (2)
Party	Candidate	Votes	%	±%
Conservative	David Jeffels	858	52.3	+52.3
Independent	Michael Jay-Hanmer	743	45.2	N/A
Conservative	Peter Bull	708	43.1	+43.1
Liberal Democrats	Robert Lockwood	286	17.4	N/A
Alliance for Green Socialism	Mavis Clayton	237	14.4	N/A
Turnout		1,646	45	
Conservative hold		Swing		
Independent gain from Conservative		Swing		

Eastfield (3)
Party	Candidate	Votes	%	±%
Liberal Democrats	Brian O'Flynn	771	71.5	
Liberal Democrats	Brian Simpson	673	62.4	
Liberal Democrats	Geoffrey Evans	517	48.0	
Labour	Bernard Pearson	229	21.2	
Labour	Tracey Asford	214	19.9	
Conservative	Carol Hill	158	14.7	
Conservative	Gordon Vickers	132	12.2	
Turnout		1,083	27	
Liberal Democrats hold		Swing		
Liberal Democrats gain from Labour		Swing		
Liberal Democrats gain from Labour		Swing		

Esk Valley (2)
Party	Candidate	Votes	%	±%
Conservative	Timothy Lawn	1,069	65.3	+65.3
Conservative	James Preston	884	54.0	+54.0
Liberal Democrats	Graham Peirson	645	39.4	N/A
Independent	Brian Crinion	317	19.4	N/A
Turnout		1,637	46	
Conservative hold		Swing		
Conservative hold		Swing		

Falsgrave Park (2)
Party	Candidate	Votes	%	±%
Labour	Patricia Marsburg	481	45.0	
Liberal Democrats	Kevin Riley	311	29.1	
Conservative	Jennifer Kelly	272	25.4	
Green	Katherine White	223	20.8	
Liberal Democrats	Andrew Ellis	193	18.0	
Independent	Kevin Scott	187	17.5	
Turnout		1,070	30	
Labour hold		Swing		
Liberal Democrats gain from Independent		Swing		

Filey (3)
Party	Candidate	Votes	%	±%
Independent	Michael Cockerill	1,080	52.8	
Conservative	Colin Haddington	903	44.2	
Independent	Samuel Cross	869	42.5	
Independent	Gordon Johnson	641	31.4	
Conservative	Rodney Cartwright	621	30.4	
Conservative	Valerie Dickenson	491	24.0	
BNP	Kevan Foulds	340	16.6	
Turnout		2,058	37	
Independent gain from Independent		Swing		
Conservative hold		Swing		
Independent gain from Conservative		Swing		

Fylingdales (1)
Party	Candidate	Votes	%	±%
Conservative	Jane Mortimer	461	65.9	+65.9
Independent	Lynn Horsman	239	34.1	N/A
Turnout		707	39	
Conservative hold		Swing		

Hertford (2)
Party	Candidate	Votes	%	±%
Conservative	Godfrey Allanson	732	47.3	
Conservative	David Chambers	709	45.8	
Liberal Democrats	Michelle Donohue-Moncrieff	591	38.2	
Green	Nicholas Harvey	508	32.8	
BNP	Louise Scott	212	13.7	
Turnout		1,550	37	
Conservative hold		Swing		
Conservative hold		Swing		

Lindhead (1)
Party	Candidate	Votes	%	±%
Conservative	Graham Backhouse	578	64.2	+2.6
Liberal Democrats	Margaret Pitts	323	35.8	+3.1
Turnout		905	51	
Conservative hold		Swing		

Mayfield (2)
Party	Candidate	Votes	%	±%
Conservative	Peter Booth	Unopposed	N/A	
Conservative	Jane Kenyon	Unopposed	N/A	
Turnout		Uncontested	N/A	
Conservative hold		Swing		
Conservative hold		Swing		

Mulgrave (2)
Party	Candidate	Votes	%	±%
Independent	John Armsby	637	54.1	N/A
Conservative	Marie Harland	528	44.8	+44.8
Liberal Democrats	John Stonehouse	442	37.5	N/A
Conservative	Beryl Christon	438	37.2	+37.2
Turnout		1,180	40	
Independent gain from Conservative		Swing		
Conservative hold		Swing		

Newby (3)
Party	Candidate	Votes	%	±%
Independent	Brian Watson	995	52.6	
Independent	Cecil Ridley	813	42.9	
Conservative	Hazel Lynskey	723	38.2	
Conservative	Cherry Smith	639	33.8	
Labour	Mary Budda	466	24.6	
Independent	John Pinder	362	19.1	
Green	Gaynor Ayres	339	17.9	
Turnout		1,893	37	
Independent hold		Swing		
Independent hold		Swing		
Conservative gain from Independent		Swing		

North Bay (2)
Party	Candidate	Votes	%	±%
Independent	Bonnie Purchon	388	41.1	
Independent	Guy Smith	368	38.9	
Conservative	Eric Smith	351	37.1	
Conservative	Michael Kelly	286	30.3	
Green	Christopher Nelson	214	22.6	
Turnout		947	29	
Independent gain from Conservative		Swing		
Independent gain from Conservative		Swing		

Northstead (2)
Party	Candidate	Votes	%	±%
Independent	Peter Popple	664	61.4	
Independent	Norman Murphy	467	43.2	
Conservative	Jacqueline Blackburn	288	26.6	
Green	Paul Johnston	220	20.4	
Labour	Elizabeth Montgomery	218	20.2	
Turnout		1,083	34	
Independent hold		Swing		
Independent hold		Swing		

Ramshill (2)
Party	Candidate	Votes	%	±%
Liberal Democrats	Svetlana Rodgers	322	34.1	
Conservative	Eileen Vickers	294	31.2	
Independent	Graeme Walker	285	30.2	
Conservative	Peter Southward	275	29.2	
Green	Norman Oldham	242	25.7	
North Yorkshire Coast Party	Colin Wigglesworth	138	14.6	
Independent	Peter Wright	134	14.2	
Turnout		950	31	
Liberal Democrats gain from Labour		Swing		
Conservative hold		Swing		

Scalby, Hackness and Staintondale (2)
Party	Candidate	Votes	%	±%
Conservative	Derek Bastiman	944	59.1	
Conservative	John Flinton	756	47.3	
Independent	Russell Bradley	533	33.4	
Independent	Thomas Miller	500	31.3	
Green	Phillip Wall	245	15.3	
Turnout		1,599	47	
Conservative hold		Swing		
Conservative gain from Independent		Swing		

Seamer (2)
Party	Candidate	Votes	%	±%
Conservative	Helen Mallory	635	44.8	
Conservative	Lucy Haycock	593	41.9	
Independent	Roxanne Murphy	564	39.8	
Liberal Democrats	Hamish Harron	378	26.7	
Independent	John Keith	346	24.4	
Turnout		1,423	38	
Conservative hold		Swing		
Conservative hold		Swing		

Stepney (2)
Party	Candidate	Votes	%	±%
Green	Jonathan Dixon	670	51.5	
Green	Dilys Cluer	477	36.7	
Conservative	Heather Phillips	313	24.1	
Liberal Democrats	Alezandra Bartlett-Cook	234	18.0	
Labour	Ian Stubbs	206	15.8	
Labour	Alan Oxley	181	13.9	
Liberal Democrats	Roderick Rodgers	174	13.4	
BNP	Alan Foulds	126	9.7	
Turnout		1,302	38	
Green gain from Conservative		Swing		
Green gain from Labour		Swing		

Streonshalh (2)
Party	Candidate	Votes	%	±%
Liberal Democrats	Robert Broadley	659	72.2	
Independent	Dorothy Clegg	466	51.0	
Conservative	Steven Leadley	275	30.1	
Turnout		920	26	
Liberal Democrats hold		Swing		
Independent gain from Independent		Swing		

Weaponness (2)
Party	Candidate	Votes	%	±%
Independent	Penny Marsden	762	55.7	
Conservative	Thomas Fox	594	43.4	
Independent	Charles Smith	546	39.9	
Conservative	Edward Sulman	437	31.9	
Liberal Democrats	Duncan Grant	188	13.7	
Turnout		1,371	44	
Independent hold		Swing		
Conservative hold		Swing		

Whitby West Cliff (2)
Party	Candidate	Votes	%	±%
Conservative	Joseph Plant	640	64.6	
Independent	Michael Ward	451	45.5	
Conservative	Ian Gregson	427	43.1	
Alliance for Green Socialism	Juliet Boddington	250	25.2	
Turnout		991	30	
Conservative hold		Swing		
Independent gain from Independent		Swing		

Woodlands (2)
Party	Candidate	Votes	%	±%
Independent	William Chatt	482	50.7	
Labour	Phillip McDonald	367	38.6	
Independent	Garry Unsworth	294	30.9	
Conservative	Josaphine O'Leary	242	25.4	
Green	Christopher Phillips	179	18.8	
Turnout		953	29	
Independent hold		Swing		
Labour hold		Swing		
