= 2016 UK Independence Party leadership election =

Two leadership elections were held in the UK Independence Party in 2016:

- July–September 2016 UK Independence Party leadership election
- October–November 2016 UK Independence Party leadership election
