= 2015 Scarborough Borough Council election =

2015 UK local government election

Results of the 2015 Scarborough Borough Council election

The 2015 Scarborough Borough Council election took place on 7 May 2015 to elect members of the Scarborough Borough Council in England. It was held on the same day as other local elections.

== Results summary ==
2015 Scarborough Borough Council election
| Party | Seats | Gains | Losses | Net gain/loss | Seats % | Votes % | Votes | +/− |
|---|---|---|---|---|---|---|---|---|
| Conservative | 26 | 5 | 4 | ▲1 | 52 | 32.5 | 20,158 | |
| Labour | 14 | 8 | 0 | ▲8 | 28 | 21.9 | 13,581 | |
| UKIP | 5 | 5 | 0 | ▲5 | 10 | 21.6 | 13,408 | |
| Independent | 3 | 0 | 11 | ▼11 | 6 | 8.3 | 5,137 | |
| Green | 2 | 1 | 1 | Steady | 4 | 10.5 | 6,522 | |
| Liberal Democrats | 0 | 0 | 3 | ▼3 | 0 | 5.2 | 3,233 | |
| National Front | 0 | 0 | 0 | Steady | 0 | 0.0 | 11 | |

== Ward results ==
=== Castle ===
Castle
| Party | Candidate | Votes | % | ±% |
|---|---|---|---|---|
| Independent | Janet Jefferson* | 872 | 51.1 | −18.8 |
| Labour | Paul Cross | 628 | 36.8 | −2.1 |
| UKIP | Barret Wilson | 402 | 23.6 | N/A |
| Green | Jason Mullen | 380 | 22.3 | N/A |
| Conservative | Anthony Fawcett | 327 | 19.2 | −8.3 |
| Majority | | | | |
| Turnout | | 1,707 | 54 | |
| Independent hold | | Swing | | |
| Labour hold | | Swing | | |

=== Cayton ===
Cayton
| Party | Candidate | Votes | % | ±% |
|---|---|---|---|---|
| Conservative | Simon Green* | 1,100 | 43.7 | +3.6 |
| Conservative | Roberta Swiers | 1,054 | 41.9 | +3.7 |
| Labour | James Brace | 745 | 29.6 | +7.5 |
| UKIP | Nicholas Henderson | 673 | 26.7 | N/A |
| Majority | | | | |
| Turnout | | 2,534 | 71 | |
| Conservative hold | | Swing | | |
| Conservative gain from Independent | | Swing | | |

=== Central ===
Central
| Party | Candidate | Votes | % | ±% |
|---|---|---|---|---|
| Labour | David Billing* | 706 | 42.9 | +3.9 |
| Labour | Eric Broadbent* | 590 | 35.9 | +2.0 |
| UKIP | Deborah McDonald | 344 | 20.9 | N/A |
| Conservative | Brenda Kaye | 340 | 20.7 | +3.4 |
| UKIP | Timothy Thorne | 332 | 20.2 | N/A |
| Green | Christopher Phillips | 234 | 14.2 | +1.8 |
| Liberal Democrats | Jacob Cook | 194 | 11.8 | −17.9 |
| Majority | | | | |
| Turnout | | 1,646 | 51 | |
| Labour hold | | Swing | | |
| Labour hold | | Swing | | |

=== Danby ===
Danby
| Party | Candidate | Votes | % | ±% |
|---|---|---|---|---|
| Conservative | Clive Pearson | 686 | 55.1 | −16.6 |
| Labour | Joan Snape | 207 | 16.6 | −11.7 |
| Green | Annette Hudspith | 145 | 11.6 | N/A |
| UKIP | Michael King | 145 | 11.6 | N/A |
| Liberal Democrats | George Dawson | 63 | 5.1 | N/A |
| Majority | | | | |
| Turnout | | 1,253 | 74 | |
| Conservative hold | | Swing | | |

=== Derwent Valley ===
Derwent Valley
| Party | Candidate | Votes | % | ±% |
|---|---|---|---|---|
| Conservative | David Jeffels* | 1,435 | 55.7 | −2.7 |
| Conservative | Heather Phillips* | 873 | 33.9 | +0.1 |
| Labour | Colin Challen** | 581 | 22.5 | N/A |
| UKIP | Lee Crowley | 569 | 22.1 | N/A |
| Liberal Democrats | Robert Lockwood | 454 | 17.6 | −4.8 |
| Majority | | | | |
| Turnout | | 2,583 | 72 | |
| Conservative hold | | Swing | | |
| Conservative gain from Independent | | Swing | | |

Colin Challen was a sitting councillor for Castle ward.

=== Eastfield ===
Eastfield
| Party | Candidate | Votes | % | ±% |
|---|---|---|---|---|
| Labour | Tony Randerson* | 713 | 36.3 | +8.1 |
| Labour | John Warburton | 596 | 30.4 | +5.5 |
| UKIP | Jonathan Dodds | 564 | 28.7 | N/A |
| Labour | Joanne Maw | 563 | 28.7 | +1.7 |
| UKIP | Jordan Seston | 535 | 27.3 | N/A |
| UKIP | Arthur Healy | 522 | 26.6 | N/A |
| Conservative | Calvin Simmons | 349 | 17.8 | +8.4 |
| Liberal Democrats | Johannes Zegstroo* | 219 | 11.2 | −25.8 |
| Green | Josh Foskett | 118 | 6.0 | N/A |
| Majority | | | | |
| Turnout | | 1,963 | 49 | |
| Labour gain from Liberal Democrats | | Swing | | |
| Labour gain from Liberal Democrats | | Swing | | |
| UKIP gain from Liberal Democrats | | Swing | | |

=== Esk Valley ===
Esk Valley
| Party | Candidate | Votes | % | ±% |
|---|---|---|---|---|
| Conservative | Guy Coulson* | 1,384 | 55.7 | −11.6 |
| Conservative | Phillip Trumper | 939 | 37.8 | −15.0 |
| Labour | John Chilton | 562 | 22.6 | +1.0 |
| Labour | Caroline Willder | 448 | 18.0 | N/A |
| UKIP | Kenneth Hordon | 435 | 17.5 | N/A |
| UKIP | Lawrence Waller | 346 | 13.9 | N/A |
| Majority | | | | |
| Turnout | | 2,501 | 71 | |
| Conservative hold | | Swing | | |
| Conservative hold | | Swing | | |

=== Falsgrave Park ===
Falsgrave Park
| Party | Candidate | Votes | % | ±% |
|---|---|---|---|---|
| Labour | John Ritchie* | 724 | 35.9 | −2.3 |
| Labour | Liz Colling | 628 | 31.1 | N/A |
| Independent | Patricia Marsburg* | 500 | 24.8 | −14.7 |
| UKIP | Deirdre Abbott | 477 | 23.6 | N/A |
| UKIP | Deirdre Bowen | 466 | 23.1 | N/A |
| Green | Stuart Noble | 291 | 14.4 | −3.0 |
| Liberal Democrats | Andrew Ellis | 250 | 12.4 | +3.1 |
| Majority | | | | |
| Turnout | | 2,037 | 56 | |
| Labour gain from Independent | | Swing | | |
| Labour hold | | Swing | | |

=== Filey ===
Filey
| Party | Candidate | Votes | % | ±% |
|---|---|---|---|---|
| Independent | Mike Cockerill* | 1,554 | 48.1 | −17.8 |
| UKIP | Sam Cross* | 1,168 | 36.2 | −19.3 |
| UKIP | Colin Haddington* | 1,103 | 34.1 | −18.1 |
| Conservative | Anthony Viney | 1,004 | 31.1 | −21.1 |
| UKIP | John Casey | 907 | 28.1 | N/A |
| Green | Nicholas Harvey | 587 | 18.2 | N/A |
| Majority | | | | |
| Turnout | | 3,295 | 61 | |
| Independent hold | | Swing | | |
| UKIP gain from Independent | | Swing | | |
| UKIP gain from Conservative | | Swing | | |

=== Fylingdales ===
Fylingdales
| Party | Candidate | Votes | % | ±% |
|---|---|---|---|---|
| Conservative | Jane Mortimer* | 630 | 52.0 | −19.6 |
| Labour | Judith Dennett | 277 | 22.9 | −5.5 |
| UKIP | John Thistle | 218 | 18.0 | N/A |
| Green | Peter Jordan | 86 | 7.1 | N/A |
| Majority | | | | |
| Turnout | | 1,215 | 70 | |
| Conservative hold | | Swing | | |

=== Hertford ===
Hertford
| Party | Candidate | Votes | % | ±% |
|---|---|---|---|---|
| Conservative | Godfrey Allanson* | 1,300 | 49.7 | −0.9 |
| Conservative | Michelle Donohue-Moncrieff* | 1,230 | 47.0 | +22.1 |
| UKIP | Janine Robinson | 890 | 34.0 | N/A |
| Green | Patricia Walker | 729 | 27.9 | −39.0 |
| Majority | | | | |
| Turnout | | 2,628 | 65 | |
| Conservative gain from Green | | Swing | | |
| Conservative hold | | Swing | | |

=== Lindhead ===
Lindhead
| Party | Candidate | Votes | % | ±% |
|---|---|---|---|---|
| Conservative | Andrew Backhouse* | 964 | 73.9 | −3.4 |
| Labour | Andrew Leak | 340 | 26.1 | +14.3 |
| Majority | | | | |
| Turnout | | 1,331 | 74 | |
| Conservative hold | | Swing | | |

=== Mayfield ===
Mayfield
| Party | Candidate | Votes | % | ±% |
|---|---|---|---|---|
| Conservative | David Chance* | 1,014 | 41.9 | +0.4 |
| Labour | Gerald Dennett | 961 | 39.7 | +0.5 |
| Conservative | Jane Kenyon-Miller* | 875 | 36.2 | −14.5 |
| UKIP | Neil Kipling | 668 | 27.6 | N/A |
| Majority | | | | |
| Turnout | | 2,430 | 65 | |
| Conservative hold | | Swing | | |
| Labour gain from Conservative | | Swing | | |

=== Mulgrave ===
Mulgrave
| Party | Candidate | Votes | % | ±% |
|---|---|---|---|---|
| Conservative | Marie Harland* | 795 | 40.9 | −18.0 |
| Conservative | John Nock | 558 | 28.7 | N/A |
| Independent | John Armsby* | 494 | 25.4 | −27.3 |
| UKIP | John Dickinson | 410 | 21.1 | N/A |
| Labour | Diane Jeuda | 353 | 18.2 | −5.9 |
| Labour | Aileen Peake | 309 | 15.9 | N/A |
| Green | Neil Bye | 212 | 10.9 | N/A |
| Independent | Connie Peach | 188 | 9.7 | N/A |
| Majority | | | | |
| Turnout | | 1,944 | 70 | |
| Conservative hold | | Swing | | |
| Conservative gain from Independent | | Swing | | |

=== Newby ===
Newby
| Party | Candidate | Votes | % | ±% |
|---|---|---|---|---|
| Conservative | Andrew Jenkinson* | 1,260 | 36.5 | +5.0 |
| Labour | Vanda Inman | 1,102 | 31.9 | +9.3 |
| Conservative | Luke Backhouse | 1,034 | 29.9 | −0.5 |
| UKIP | Andrew Smith | 1,026 | 29.7 | N/A |
| UKIP | Graham Snelson | 833 | 24.1 | N/A |
| Conservative | Thomas Miller | 761 | 22.0 | −5.9 |
| Green | Helen Kindness | 686 | 19.9 | +5.6 |
| Liberal Democrats | Joseph Hagan | 503 | 14.6 | +2.0 |
| Independent | Deborah Wiles | 403 | 11.7 | N/A |
| Majority | | | | |
| Turnout | | 3,460 | 68 | |
| Conservative gain from Independent | | Swing | | |
| Labour gain from Independent | | Swing | | |
| Conservative hold | | Swing | | |

=== North Bay ===
North Bay
| Party | Candidate | Votes | % | ±% |
|---|---|---|---|---|
| Labour | Neil Price | 726 | 37.2 | +4.5 |
| Conservative | Martin Smith* | 462 | 23.7 | −6.4 |
| UKIP | Guy Smith | 452 | 23.2 | −2.1 |
| Conservative | Ros Fox | 443 | 22.7 | N/A |
| UKIP | Susan Johnson | 417 | 21.4 | N/A |
| Green | Katy Graley | 340 | 17.4 | +4.9 |
| Independent | Jo Swift | 210 | 10.8 | N/A |
| Majority | | | | |
| Turnout | | 1,954 | 57 | |
| Labour hold | | Swing | | |
| Conservative hold | | Swing | | |

=== Northstead ===
Northstead
| Party | Candidate | Votes | % | ±% |
|---|---|---|---|---|
| Labour | Carl Maw | 748 | 37.9 | +3.8 |
| UKIP | Norman Murphy* | 624 | 31.6 | −3.7 |
| Conservative | Matthew Kay | 586 | 29.7 | +9.6 |
| Independent | Peter Popple* | 550 | 27.9 | −19.0 |
| UKIP | Bryan Thomas | 336 | 17.0 | N/A |
| Liberal Democrats | Paul Cook | 263 | 13.3 | +5.8 |
| Majority | | | | |
| Turnout | | 1,975 | 64 | |
| Labour gain from Independent | | Swing | | |
| UKIP gain from Independent | | Swing | | |

=== Ramshill ===
Ramshill
| Party | Candidate | Votes | % | ±% |
|---|---|---|---|---|
| Labour | Steve Siddons* | 773 | 43.2 | +16.3 |
| Green | Mark Vesey | 550 | 30.7 | +10.0 |
| Conservative | Jonathan Simmons | 452 | 25.2 | −6.1 |
| UKIP | Stuart Abbott | 420 | 23.5 | N/A |
| Conservative | Teddy Sulman | 407 | 22.7 | −6.2 |
| UKIP | Chris Daniels | 392 | 21.9 | N/A |
| Liberal Democrats | John-Paul Zegstroo | 196 | 10.9 | −12.3 |
| Majority | | | | |
| Turnout | | 1,795 | 61 | |
| Labour gain from Independent | | Swing | | |
| Green gain from Conservative | | Swing | | |

=== Scalby, Hackness and Staintondale ===
Scalby, Hackness and Staintondale
| Party | Candidate | Votes | % | ±% |
|---|---|---|---|---|
| Conservative | Derek Bastiman* | 1,305 | 50.9 | −9.0 |
| Conservative | Hazel Lynskey | 1,097 | 42.8 | −8.0 |
| UKIP | Stuart Walker | 631 | 24.6 | N/A |
| Labour | Subash Sharma** | 495 | 19.3 | N/A |
| Green | John Munro | 387 | 15.1 | −3.6 |
| Majority | | | | |
| Turnout | | 2,568 | 76 | |
| Conservative hold | | Swing | | |
| Conservative hold | | Swing | | |

Subash Sharma was a sitting councillor for North Bay ward.

=== Seamer ===
Seamer
| Party | Candidate | Votes | % | ±% |
|---|---|---|---|---|
| Conservative | Helen Mallory* | 1,162 | 46.2 | +3.5 |
| UKIP | Roxanne Murphy* | 906 | 36.0 | +2.2 |
| Liberal Democrats | Kayleigh Bradley | 499 | 19.8 | N/A |
| Liberal Democrats | Bob Jackman | 403 | 16.0 | −3.0 |
| Green | Michael Cutler | 373 | 14.8 | +0.9 |
| Majority | | | | |
| Turnout | | 2,546 | 68 | |
| Conservative hold | | Swing | | |
| UKIP gain from Independent | | Swing | | |

=== Stepney ===
Stepney
| Party | Candidate | Votes | % | ±% |
|---|---|---|---|---|
| Conservative | Lynn Bastiman* | 640 | 28.9 | +0.7 |
| Green | Dilys Cluer* | 628 | 28.4 | −5.0 |
| UKIP | Mark Harland | 542 | 24.5 | N/A |
| Labour | Andy Lee | 461 | 20.8 | −0.2 |
| Green | David Hugh-Malone | 433 | 19.6 | +1.3 |
| Labour | Colin Barnes | 429 | 19.4 | +4.8 |
| Liberal Democrats | Alix Bartlett-Cook | 166 | 7.5 | −2.2 |
| Majority | | | | |
| Turnout | | 2,217 | 66 | |
| Conservative hold | | Swing | | |
| Green hold | | Swing | | |

=== Streonshalh ===
Streonshalh
| Party | Candidate | Votes | % | ±% |
|---|---|---|---|---|
| Labour | Rob Barnett | 681 | 36.4 | +7.1 |
| Conservative | Sandra Turner* | 555 | 29.7 | −8.6 |
| UKIP | Mike Ward | 550 | 29.4 | N/A |
| Labour | Paul Tulloch | 469 | 25.1 | −1.8 |
| Conservative | Dorothy Clegg* | 421 | 22.5 | −10.0 |
| Green | Amanda Smith | 214 | 11.4 | N/A |
| Majority | | | | |
| Turnout | | 1,879 | 54 | |
| Labour gain from Conservative | | Swing | | |
| Conservative hold | | Swing | | |

=== Weaponness ===
Weaponness
| Party | Candidate | Votes | % | ±% |
|---|---|---|---|---|
| Conservative | Thomas Fox* | 743 | 36.9 | −13.8 |
| Conservative | Callam Walsh | 677 | 33.6 | −18.9 |
| Labour | Chris Head | 528 | 26.2 | +8.5 |
| UKIP | Sean Hunter | 392 | 19.5 | −3.0 |
| Green | David King | 360 | 17.9 | +3.3 |
| UKIP | Frank Wright | 327 | 16.2 | N/A |
| Liberal Democrats | Natasha Cook | 316 | 15.7 | N/A |
| Majority | | | | |
| Turnout | | 2,019 | 70 | |
| Conservative hold | | Swing | | |
| Conservative hold | | Swing | | |

=== Whitby West Cliff ===
Whitby West Cliff
| Party | Candidate | Votes | % | ±% |
|---|---|---|---|---|
| Conservative | Joseph Plant* | 833 | 44.2 | −6.0 |
| Conservative | Alf Abbott* | 721 | 38.3 | −1.4 |
| Labour | Noreen Wilson | 622 | 33.0 | +10.6 |
| Labour | Heather Relf | 580 | 30.8 | +10.3 |
| UKIP | Derek Robinson | 505 | 26.8 | N/A |
| Majority | | | | |
| Turnout | | 1,895 | 60 | |
| Conservative hold | | Swing | | |
| Conservative hold | | Swing | | |

=== Woodlands ===
Woodlands
| Party | Candidate | Votes | % | ±% |
|---|---|---|---|---|
| Labour | Richard Moody | 648 | 34.8 | −8.6 |
| Independent | William Chatt* | 554 | 29.8 | −13.8 |
| Conservative | Jennifer Kelly | 425 | 22.8 | +2.7 |
| UKIP | Phil McDonald | 397 | 21.3 | −4.8 |
| UKIP | John Elwell-Sutton | 355 | 19.1 | N/A |
| Green | Gabrielle Naptali | 202 | 10.9 | +1.4 |
| Liberal Democrats | Jackie Bowdidge | 110 | 5.9 | −2.2 |
| National Front | Trisha Scott | 11 | 0.6 | N/A |
| Majority | | | | |
| Turnout | | 1,869 | 57 | |
| Labour hold | | Swing | | |
| Independent hold | | Swing | | |
