= 1999 Scarborough Borough Council election =

1999 UK local government election

The 1999 Scarborough Borough Council election to the Scarborough Borough Council was held on 6 May 1999. The whole council was up for election and the council stayed under no overall control.

== Election result ==
Scarborough local election result 1999
Party	Seats	Gains	Losses	Net gain/loss	Seats %	Votes %	Votes	+/−
Conservative	17			+4	34.7			
Independent	14			+4	28.6			
Labour	13			-9	26.5			
Liberal Democrats	5			+1	10.2			
