= Wessenden Head Reservoir =

Reservoir in Yorkshire, England

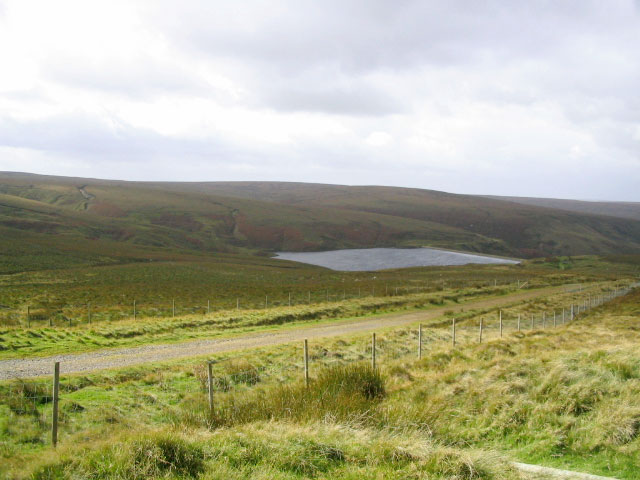

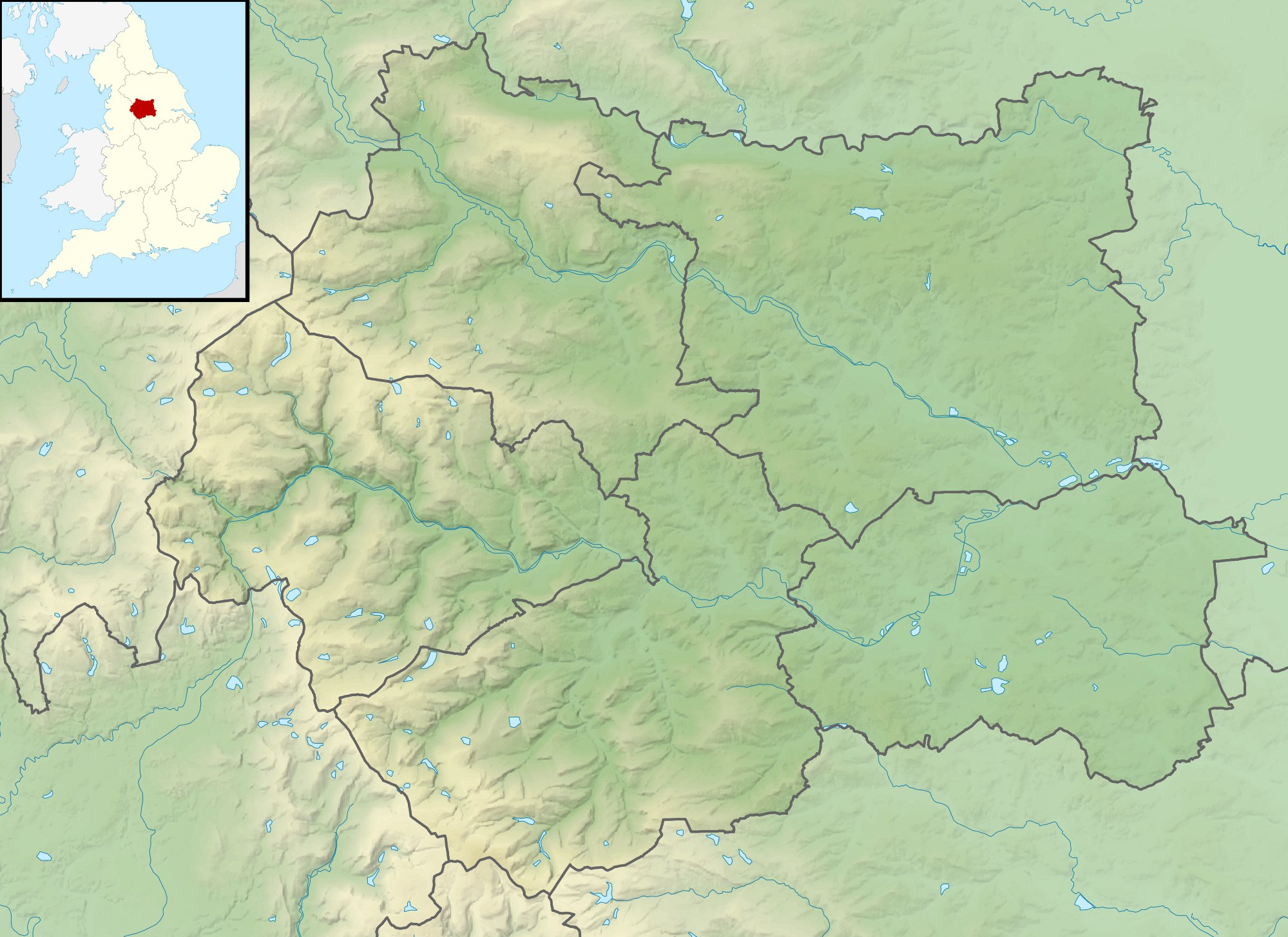
- Location within West Yorkshire
- Location: West Yorkshire
- Coordinates: 53.564°N 1.896°W
- Type: reservoir
- Primary inflows: Shiny Brook Loadley Clough stream Wicken Grain; Rushy Sike Clough stream Pudding Real Clough stream
- Primary outflows: Wessenden Brook
- Basin countries: United Kingdom
- Built: 1881
- Max. length: 0.3 kilometres (0.2 mi)
- Max. width: 300 metres (984 ft)
- Water volume: 372,780 cubic metres (82,000,000 imp gal)
- Surface elevation: 386 metres (1,266 ft)

Wessenden Head Reservoir is the highest in a series of four reservoirs in the Wessenden Valley above the village of Marsden in West Yorkshire, at the northern end of the Peak District National Park.

Following the Wessenden Valley Reservoir Embankment Act 1836 (6 & 7 Will. 4. c. xciv), Wessenden Reservoir was created by the construction of an earth embankment across Wessenden Brook. The Huddersfield Waterworks and Improvement Act 1876 (39 & 40 Vict. c. c) approved the building of a new reservoir above Wessenden Reservoir. Wessenden Head Reservoir was built between 1877 and 1881, fed from a catchwater drain via a sluice in the Shiny Brook (a tributary of Wessenden Brook). The Huddersfield Corporation Waterworks Act 1890 (53 & 54 Vict. c. cxv) led to Huddersfield Corporation purchasing the reservoirs from the Wessenden Commissioners in order to supply drinking water to the town.

Wessenden Head Reservoir has a storage capacity of 82,000,000 imperial gallons (370,000,000 L). The reservoir is currently owned and operated by Yorkshire Water.

The Wessenden Valley Woodland Project was initiated in 2017 to develop natural habitats with increased biodiversity.

The Pennine Way long-distance footpath runs along the northern side of the reservoir and its dam.

== See also ==
- Yorkshire Water Way
