= Lake Eskdale =

Lake in North Yorkshire, England

- Diagram of Lake Eskdale and surroundings
- Interactive map of Lake Eskdale
- Location: Esk Valley, North Yorkshire, England
- Coordinates: 54.455°N 0.831°W
- Type: Proglacial lake
- Primary outflows: Newton Dale
- Surface elevation: 225 metres (738 ft)

Lake Eskdale was proposed a proglacial lake of the Devensian glacial era, situated in what is now Eskdale, in North Yorkshire, England. The lake filled the valley of what is now the River Esk, and was one of several lakes in the North York Moors. When it overflowed some 70,000 years ago, the water channelled southwards through what is now Newton Dale towards another larger body of water, Lake Pickering. Percy Fry Kendall suggested the presence of the lakes in the North York Moors in 1902, but further studies in the latter half of the twentieth century have proposed other possibilities for why the water carved Newton Dale.

== History ==
Lake Eskdale is thought to have formed in the Devensian period in what is now the upper Esk Valley in North Yorkshire. Water was impounded by ice sheets to the west and east, and the lake was centred around Castleton, with Kildale at its western extremity, and the lake reached a height of 225 metres (738 ft). Ice at the eastern edge impounded much of the water and left a terminal moraine now known as Lealholm Rigg (at NZ752083). Ice was also present at the western end, and the distance between the two edges has been calculated to around 17 kilometres (11 mi). The geomorphologist who first proposed the idea of the lakes in Eskdale estimated the depth of the lake to be about 120 metres (400 ft).

The lake was suggested by Kendall in 1902, alongside the other lakes in the area (such as Lake Pickering), but it was determined by the overflow channels carved by the water leaving the lake as opposed to other suggested proglacial lakes which were detected by the presence of glaciolacustrine sediments.

Eskdale was the highest of the suggested lakes in the area at 225 metres (738 ft); Lake Glaisdale and Lake Wheeldale were thought to be 15 metres (50 ft) lower than Eskdale, and Lake Pickering occupied the low ground that is now the Vale of Pickering and was thought to be 69 metres (225 ft) above sea level.

Water could not escape the lake to the north and east because of the North Sea Lobe (NSL), an ice sheet which pushed as far south as the Wash and Norfolk. Water from Lake Eskdale first drained into the adjoining lakes of Kildale (to the west), and Glaisdale and Wheeldale in the east, before the water found an outlet southwards into Lake Pickering by way of Randy Mere and Goathland and into what is now Newton Dale. The waters carved an overflow channel 70,000 years ago in a rough southerly direction, which is noted as being one of the finest examples of an overflow channel in England. It is thought that the channel may have been wider or deeper, but post-glacial deposition of material has infilled the dale.

During the second half of the 20th century other geomorphologists thought that whilst Newton Dale was indeed carved out by water, most of the water from lakes in the North York Moors would have drained away to the north east. The studies on the gravel and other deposits in Newton Dale suggested that the channel was cut before the Devensian period as the fine-grained gravel distributed is too small to have been deposited by the high volume of water which was needed to carve out the channel, and so the channel was cut before the period suggested when Lake Eskdale and others were present. It has been stated that there is no lithostratigraphical or chronostratigraphical evidence to support this theory.

== See also ==
- Lake Pickering
