= Topographical areas of Yorkshire =

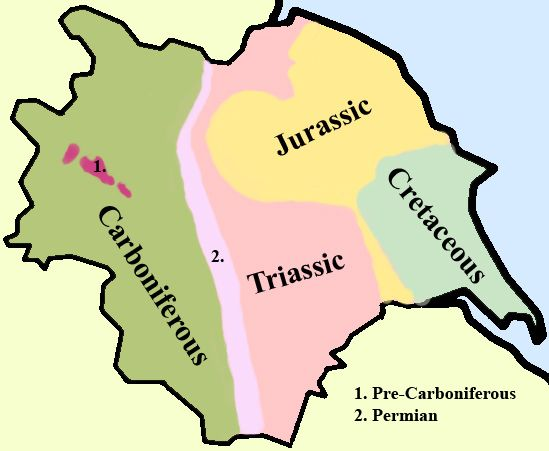
A simplified geology of Yorkshire

In Yorkshire there is a very close relationship between the major topographical areas and the geological period in which they were formed. The Pennine chain of Hills in the west is of Carboniferous origin. The central vale is Permo-Triassic. The North York Moors in the north-east of the county are Jurassic in age while the Yorkshire Wolds to the south east are Cretaceous chalk uplands. The plain of Holderness and the Humberhead levels both owe their present form to the Quaternary ice ages.

Much of Yorkshire presents heavily glaciated scenery as few places escaped the great ice sheets as they advanced during the last ice age.

== Drainage ==
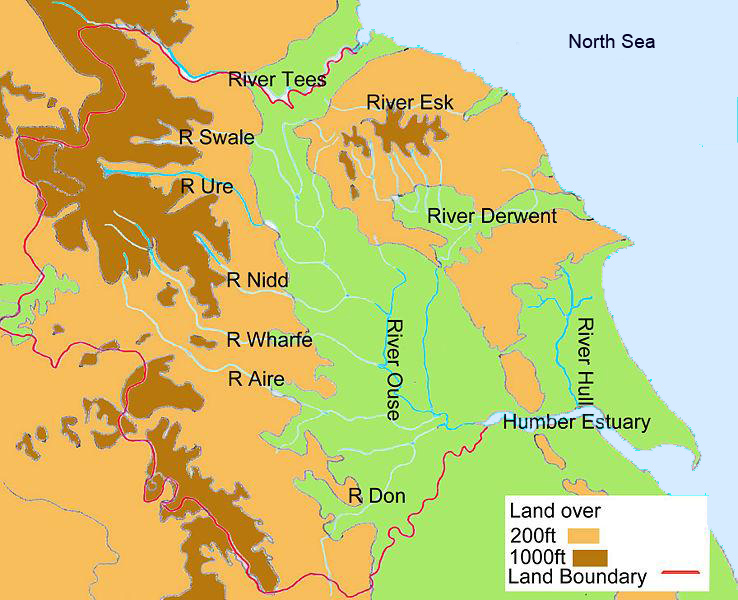
The main rivers of Yorkshire

=== Humber ===
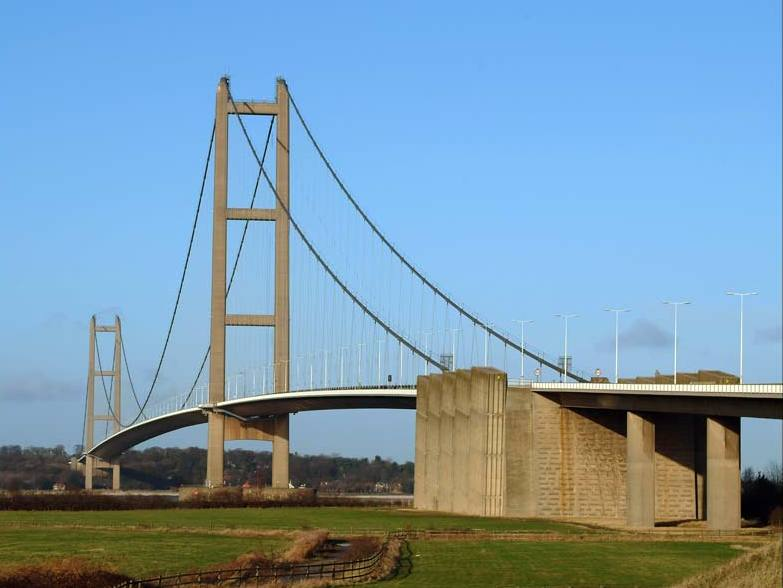
The Humber Bridge was designed based on ideas by Sir Ralph Freeman before the 1950s, then Sir Gilbert Roberts in 1955 and 1964, and a final complete design by Bernard Wex. It was made with a significant amount of ground granulated blast-furnace slag.

Yorkshire is drained by several rivers. In western and central Yorkshire, the many rivers empty their waters into the River Ouse, which reaches the North Sea via the Humber Estuary. The most northerly of the rivers in the Ouse system is the River Swale, which drains Swaledale before passing through Richmond and meandering across the Vale of Mowbray.

Next in the Ouse system, draining in Wensleydale, is the River Ure, which joins the Swale east of Boroughbridge. The River Nidd rises on the edge of the Yorkshire Dales National Park and flows along Nidderdale before reaching the Vale of York.

The Ouse is the name given to the river after its confluence with the Ure at Ouse Gill Beck. The River Wharfe, which drains Wharfedale, joins the Ouse upstream of Cawood. The Rivers Aire and Calder are more southerly contributors to the River Ouse. The most southerly Yorkshire tributary is the River Don, which flows northwards to join the main river at Goole.

The River Derwent rises on the North York Moors, flows south then westwards through the Vale of Pickering, then turns south again to drain the eastern part of the Vale of York. It empties into the River Ouse at Barmby on the Marsh.

To the east of the Yorkshire Wolds, the River Hull flows southwards to join the Humber Estuary at Kingston upon Hull. The western Pennines are served by the River Ribble, which drains westwards into the Irish Sea close to Lytham St Annes.The largest freshwater lake in the region is Hornsea Mere in the East Riding of Yorkshire.

=== Esk and Tees ===
In the far north of the county, the River Tees flows eastwards through Teesdale and empties its waters into the North Sea downstream of Middlesbrough. The smaller River Esk flows from west to east at the northern foot of the North York Moors to reach the sea at Whitby.

== Topographical Areas ==
=== Natural Areas ===
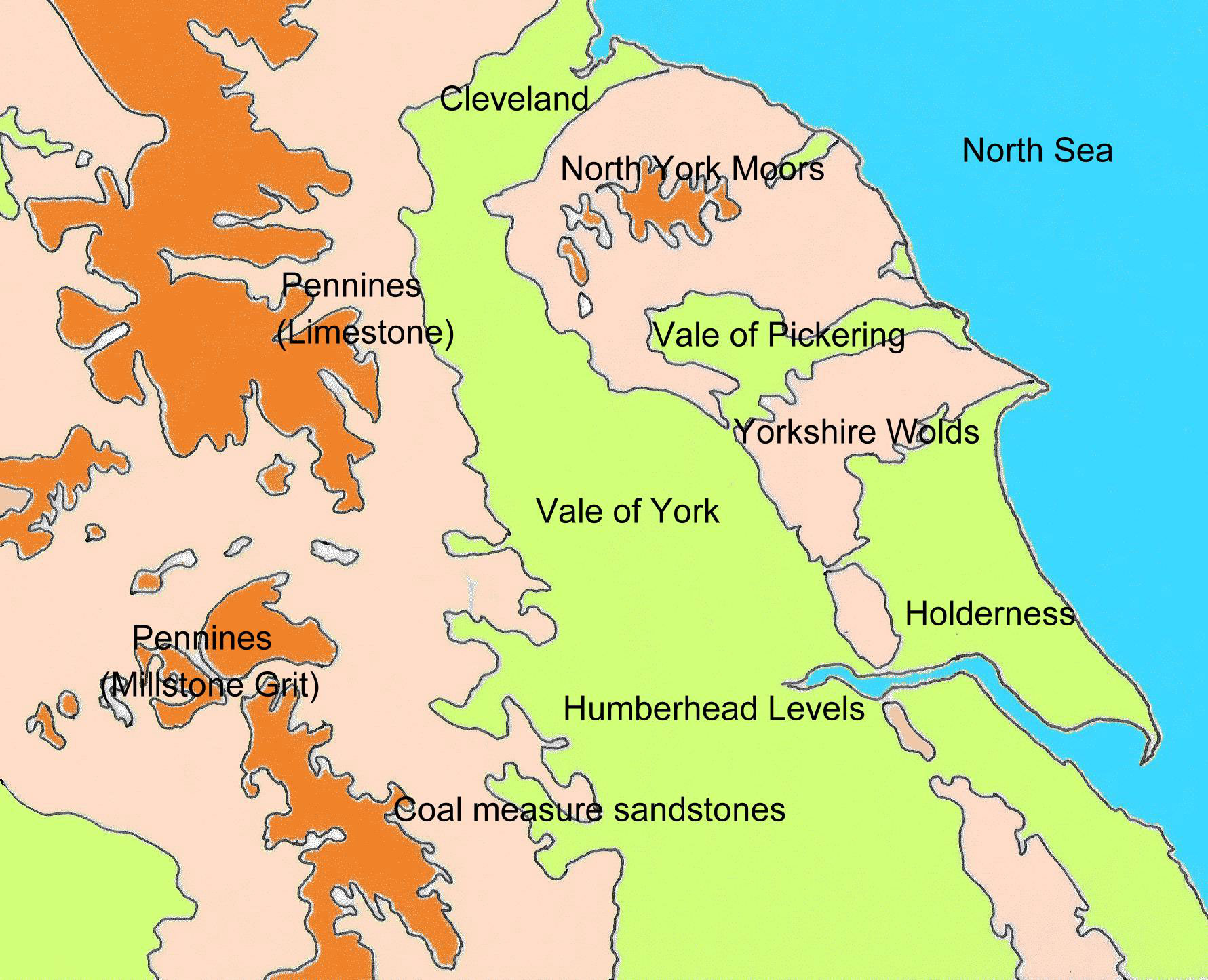
The natural sub-regions of Yorkshire

Natural England, the name given to the body responsible to the UK government for natural affairs has defined 14 distinctive Natural Areas in Yorkshire. These are:

- Yorkshire Dales (16)
- Southern Pennines (12)
- Pennine Dales Fringe (15)
- Vale of York and Mowbray (1&8)
- North York Moors and Hills (13)
- Vale of Pickering (2)
- Yorkshire Wolds (4)
- Holderness (5)
- Humberhead Levels (7)
- Southern Magnesian Limestone (9)
- Coal Measures (10)
- Humber Estuary
- Saltburn to Bridlington
- Bridlington to Skegness

Figures in brackets refer to the equivalent Joint Character Areas outlined in the next section and illustrated on the map.

Natural Areas are defined as "biogeographic zones which reflect the geographic foundation, the natural systems and processes, and the wildlife in different parts of England, and provide a framework for setting objectives for nature conservation."

=== Joint Character Areas ===
Location of Yorkshire Joint Character Areas: 1. Vale of Mowbray; 2. Vale of Pickering; 3. Howardian Hills; 4. Yorkshire Wolds; 5. Holderness; 6. Humber Estuary; 7. Humberhead Levels; 8. Vale of York; 9. Southern Magnesian Limestone; 10. Nottinghamshire, Derbyshire and Yorkshire Coalfield; 11. Yorkshire Southern Pennine Fringe; 12. Southern Pennines; 13. North York Moors and Cleveland Hills; 14. Cleveland/ Tees Lowlands; 15. Pennine Dales Fringe; 16. Yorkshire Dales; 17. North Pennines; 18. Bowland Fells

The Natural Areas concept was further refined by the Joint Nature Conservancy Council in their definition of Joint Character Areas. These used Natural Areas for their basis but added other defining characteristics such as historical associations to produce a list of characteristic areas within the county.

=== Areas of Outstanding Natural Beauty ===
- Nidderdale
- North Pennines
- Howardian Hills

=== National Parks ===
- Peak District
- North York Moors
- Yorkshire Dales

=== Sites of Special Scientific Interest ===
- Spurn Point, Humber Estuary

=== Nature Reserves ===
- RSPB Bempton Cliffs
- RSPB Blacktoft Sands
- RSPB Fairburn Ings
- RSPB St Aidan's
- RSPB Old Moor
- YWT North Cave Wetlands
- YWT Potteric Carr
- YWT Spurn Point
- YWT Wheldrake Ings
