= Blackmoorfoot Reservoir =

Reservoir in Yorkshire, England

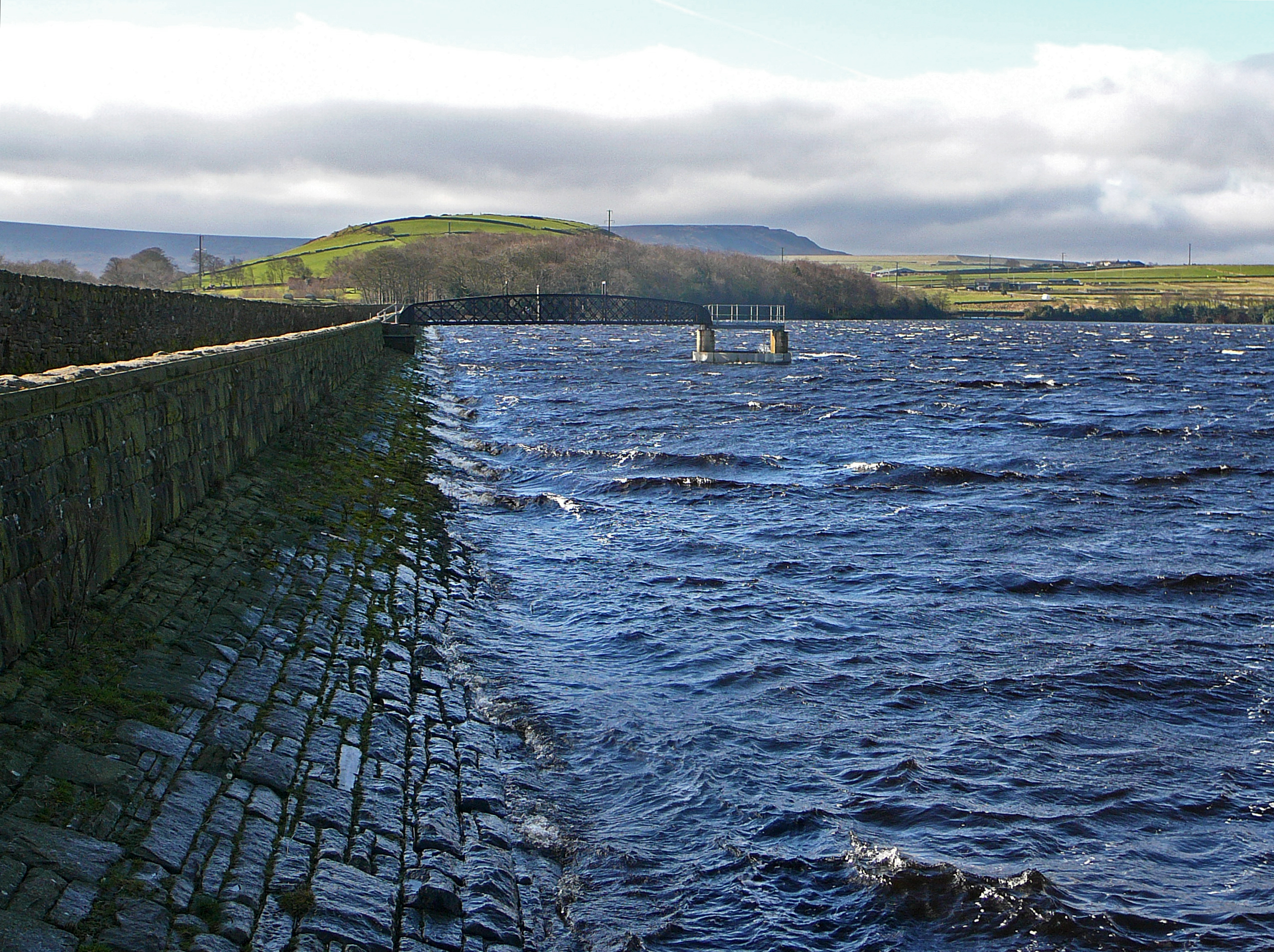
- Blackmoorfoot reservoir
- Interactive map of Blackmoorfoot Reservoir
- Location: Blackmoorfoot, West Yorkshire, England
- Coordinates: 53.610°N 1.852°W
- Type: Reservoir
- Catchment area: 130 hectares (320 acres)
- Managing agency: Yorkshire Water
- Designation: Drinking water protected area (UKGB30431382)
- Built: 1871–1876
- First flooded: 18 November 1874
- Surface area: 38 hectares (94 acres)
- Average depth: 7.8 metres (26 ft)
- Water volume: 2,962,139 cubic metres (104,607,000 cu ft)
- Surface elevation: 253 metres (830 ft)
- Website: Official webpage

Blackmoorfoot Reservoir is a freshwater supply reservoir located on moorland 4 miles (6.4 km) south of Huddersfield in West Yorkshire, England. The reservoir lies at an altitude of 253 metres (830 ft) above sea level, and is fed by catchwaters dug into the moorland to the south-west of the reservoir. It was built in the 1870s, and is now owned by Yorkshire Water.

== History ==
The reservoir is 4 miles (6.4 km) south-west of Huddersfield, and lies at an altitude of 253 metres (830 ft), draining an area of 130 hectares (320 acres), with water being fed into the reservoir by catchwaters cut into the moorland. The reservoir contains 2,962,139 cubic metres (104,607,000 cu ft) of water, covers an area of 38 hectares (94 acres), and has an average depth of 7.8 metres (26 ft). The name is first recorded on Ordnance Survey maps in the early 19th century, deriving from Old Norse blæc mōr fōt.

The reservoir was approved under the Huddersfield Water Act 1869 (32 & 33 Vict. c. cx) (Note: An Act for transferring to the Corporation of Huddersfield the undertaking of the commissioners for the Huddersfield Waterworks and for empowering the corporation to construct additional waterworks and to supply water within extended limits and for other purposes.) although it lists the reservoir as Black Moor Foot. As built, the reservoir infrastructure also included 8.9 kilometres (5.5 mi) of conduits (catchwaters) across the moorland carrying water into the reservoir. This consists of two conduits, the Meltham Catchwater and the Lower Catchwater, which drain water from the surrounding moorland, some of which has run through old colliery workings. The reservoir was built with two embankments; one on the north side, and one on the south side. The north embankment was built to be 780 metres (850 yd) long, 120 metres (400 ft) wide at the base, and 21 metres (70 ft) high. The south side was built at 460 metres (500 yd) long, 73 metres (240 ft) wide at the base, and 12 metres (40 ft) high. The two embankments have a puddle clay core (the clay was dug out of the earth just to the south west of the dam), with first flooding commencing in November 1874; the structure was completed in 1876, with the reservoir being full and overflowing for the first time on 20 December 1876. The reservoir cost £260,000 and was one of many schemes undertaken in the hills to the south and west of Huddersfield during the 19th and 20th centuries, including dams in the Wessenden Valley, Deerness and Digley.

Blackmoorfoot Reservoir was built to accommodate the water requirements of the expanding Huddersfield district in the late 19th century, but it now has a dual purpose; to compensate river flow, and storage of water to provide into the drinking water supply. A water treatment works was installed at the reservoir in 1989, and the site is designated as a drinking water protected area.

Since ornithological records were first kept in 1956, the site has noted over 200 different types of bird visitors, including a pomarine skua, and a terek sandpiper, a Russian bird, which is believed to have been blown off course when migrating.

During the 20th century, an old tramcar from Manchester was used as a summerhouse by the reservoir. The name of the reservoir was used by the Church of England to name one its deaneries when the parishes around Huddersfield were re-organised in 1969. A public path runs along the eastern side of the reservoir; this is promoted by Yorkshire Water, the reservoir's owners.

== Rainfall ==
Rainfall data has been collected almost continuously at Blackmoorfoot since 1873, (Note: The rainfall statistics for 1980 and 1981 are not available; it is knot known if this is an interruption in the data collection, or whether the statistics are simply not available.) and is the oldest data for rainfall in the Ouse catchment.

A graph showing rainfall data for Blackmoorfoot, in West Yorkshire, England.

Rainfall at Blackmoorfoot - yearly average, 1968 to 1991
Year	Rainfall (Note: Blackmoorfoot Resr No. 1 at SE096130, 244 metres (801 ft) above sea level.)	Ref	Year	Rainfall (Note: Blackmoorfoot Resr No. 2 at SE099131, 243 metres (797 ft) above sea level.)	Ref
1968	1,424 millimetres (56.1 in)		1980	No data	
1969	1,075 millimetres (42.3 in)		1981	No data	
1970	1,275 millimetres (50.2 in)		1982	1,336 millimetres (52.6 in)	
1971	1,010 millimetres (40 in)		1983	1,193 millimetres (47.0 in)	
1972	1,146 millimetres (45.1 in)		1984	1,057 millimetres (41.6 in)	
1973	1,013 millimetres (39.9 in)		1985	926 millimetres (36.5 in)	
1974	1,262 millimetres (49.7 in)		1986	1,338 millimetres (52.7 in)	
1975	895 millimetres (35.2 in)		1987	1,037 millimetres (40.8 in)	
1976	1,090 millimetres (43 in)		1988	1,283 millimetres (50.5 in)	
1977	1,395 millimetres (54.9 in)		1989	1,010 millimetres (40 in)	
1978	1,115 millimetres (43.9 in)		1990	1,140 millimetres (45 in)	
1979	1,505 millimetres (59.3 in)		1991	984 millimetres (38.7 in)	
