= Lake Pickering =

Old proglacial lake

Coordinates: 54.1981°N 0.7327°W

Lake Pickering was an extensive proglacial lake of the Devensian glacial. It filled the Vale of Pickering between the North York Moors and the Yorkshire Wolds, when the (largely Scandinavian) ice blocked the drainage, which had flowed north-eastwards past the site of Filey towards the Northern North Sea basin. The lake surface rose until it overflowed southwards and cut an exit between the Howardian Hills and the Yorkshire Wolds at Kirkham Priory between Malton and Stamford Bridge, so creating the River Derwent.

In modern times, as an artificial flood relief channel, much of the flow of the River Derwent (which drains a large area of the North York Moors) has been diverted, about 6 miles (10 km) upstream of West Ayton, before it reaches the plain of the Vale of Pickering, east into a new channel called the Sea Cut along a previously dry side valley (probably a glacial overflow channel) and into the existing Scalby Beck's course through Scalby, North Yorkshire to the North Sea.

The idea of these lakes was first proposed in 1902, when Professor Percy Kendall of Leeds University published a paper detailing his theories. It has been suggested that lake Pickering was the largest inland lake in Britain at the end of the last Ice Age.

== Wider picture ==
North of Lake Pickering, the North Sea ice sheet was restrained by the North York Moors while the Cleveland Hills deflected the British ice to the west of the Vale of Pickering, down the Ouse valley. The small proglacial lakes, including Lake Eskdale and Lake Wheeldale, which formed in the northern valleys of the North York Moors overflowed one into another then overflowed via the col at the head of Newton Dale, which now leads south to Pickering via Pickering Beck.

With the old exit blocked by the North Sea ice sheet, the Vale of Pickering filled and overflowed between the Howardian Hills and the Yorkshire Wolds into an arm of a much larger proglacial Lake Humber which filled the lower Ouse valley, the lower Trent valley and, via a narrow gap at Lincoln, the Fenland basin.

The extent of the Ouse valley ice varied from time to time but there are two major terminal moraines, one at Escrick and one at York. The out-flowing water passed between this ice and the Wolds to the north arm of Lake Fenland. At Kirkham, the junction between the two lakes was narrow but the extent to which they were strictly separate varied with time. Initially, the surface of Lake Pickering was higher than that of Lake Fenland, but the surface of Lake Fenland was at 82 feet (25 m) to 85 feet (26 m) or a little above. This is the altitude of the highest point on its spillway, at the head of the River Wissey, a level verifiable by looking for old shore-lines around The Fens. The modern Derwent has already descended to 66 feet (20 m) by the time it reaches the middle of the Vale of Pickering. Thus, although it began as a separate lake, Lake Pickering seems to have settled down to the level of Lake Fenland and become a part of it.

From the spillway, meltwater reached the sea via the valley in which the Strait of Dover and the English Channel now lie.

In 2003, John Eckersley published a book entitled Exploring Lake Pickering, which takes the form of a 155-mile (249 km) walk around the edges of what was Lake Pickering.

== Maps ==
- Lake Fenland’s spillway toward the southern North Sea basin (Source of the Waveney/Little Ouse at 25/26m).
- The Derwent crosses the 20m contour at grid reference SE927790, on the Derwent at East Heslerton Carr.
- The narrow Derwent valley at Kirkham.
- The col between Esk Dale and Newton Dale.
