= Dale Dike Reservoir =

Reservoir in the north-east Peak District, England

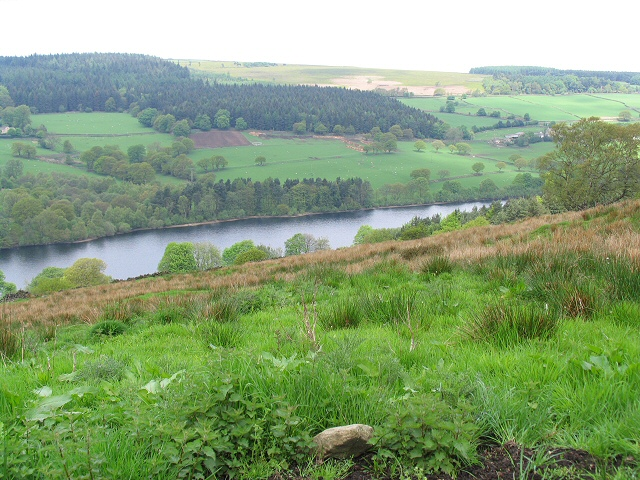
- Dale Dike Reservoir (dam)

- Location within Sheffield
- Location: Sheffield
- Coordinates: 53°25′04″N 1°38′28″W
- Type: Reservoir
- Primary inflows: Dale Dike
- Primary outflows: Dale Dike
- Catchment area: 4,010 acres (1,623 ha)
- Basin countries: United Kingdom
- Surface area: 58 acres (23.4 ha)
- Average depth: 29 ft (8.8 m)

Dale Dike Reservoir or Dale Dyke Reservoir (grid reference SK240913) is a reservoir in the north-east Peak District, in the City of Sheffield, South Yorkshire, England, a mile (1.6 km) west of Bradfield and eight miles (13 km) from the centre of Sheffield, on the Dale Dike, a tributary of the River Loxley.

Along with three other reservoirs around the village of Bradfield – Agden, Damflask and Strines – it was constructed between 1859 and 1864 by the Sheffield Waterworks Company to guarantee a supply of water to power the mills downstream and to supply drinking water to the growing population of Sheffield. The architect was John Gunson.

== Great Sheffield Flood ==
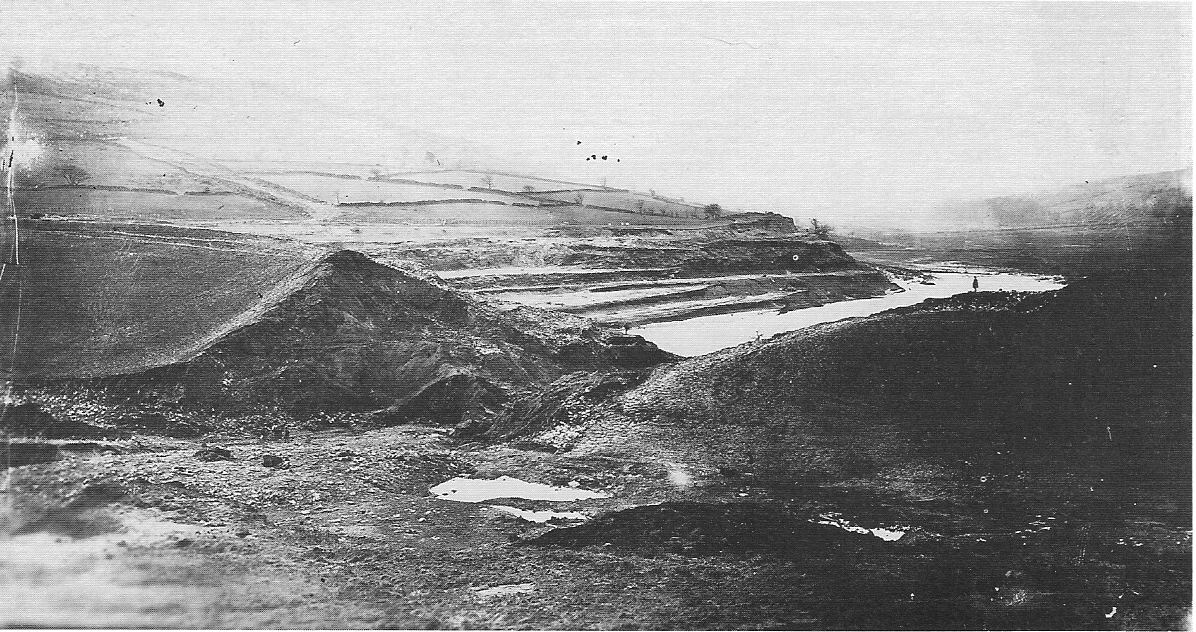
Remains of the Dale Dyke Dam after the flood

The original dam was constructed to a height of 95 feet (29 m) by John Towlerton Leather, and was completed by April 1863. The dam head had a puddle clay core and had a maximum volume of 114 million cubic feet (3.240 million cubic metres). Filling took place soon after, and by 10 March 1864, the water level was 2 feet 4 inches (0.7 m) below the crest of the dam.

At 23:30 on 11 March 1864, the day after the reservoir was finally full, the newly built dam failed. Over 690 million imperial gallons (3.1 Gl) of water cascaded down the valley causing the Great Sheffield Flood, which caused massive damage downstream along the Loxley and Don and through the centre of Sheffield, destroying over 5,000 properties and killing 244 people.

== The new dam ==
The dam was rebuilt in 1875, some 980 feet (300 m) upstream of the previous dam head, and is still in use, holding 72,860,000 cubic feet (2,063,200 m^{3}) of water, now used exclusively for domestic purposes. It is owned by Yorkshire Water, part of the Kelda Group.

== See also ==
- List of disasters in Great Britain and Ireland by death toll
