= Damflask Reservoir =

Reservoir in South Yorkshire, England

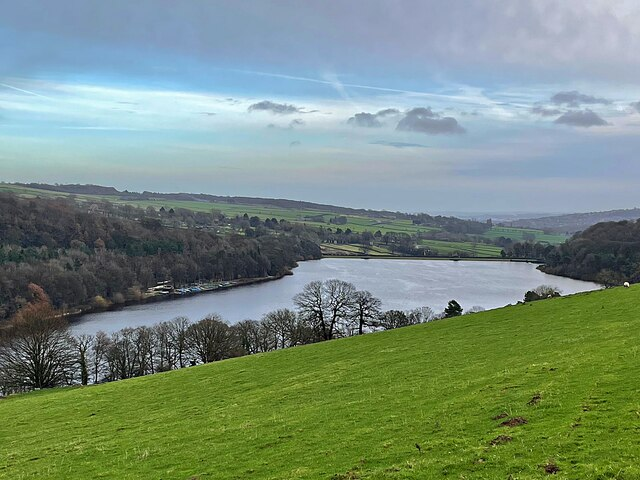
- A view of the reservoir

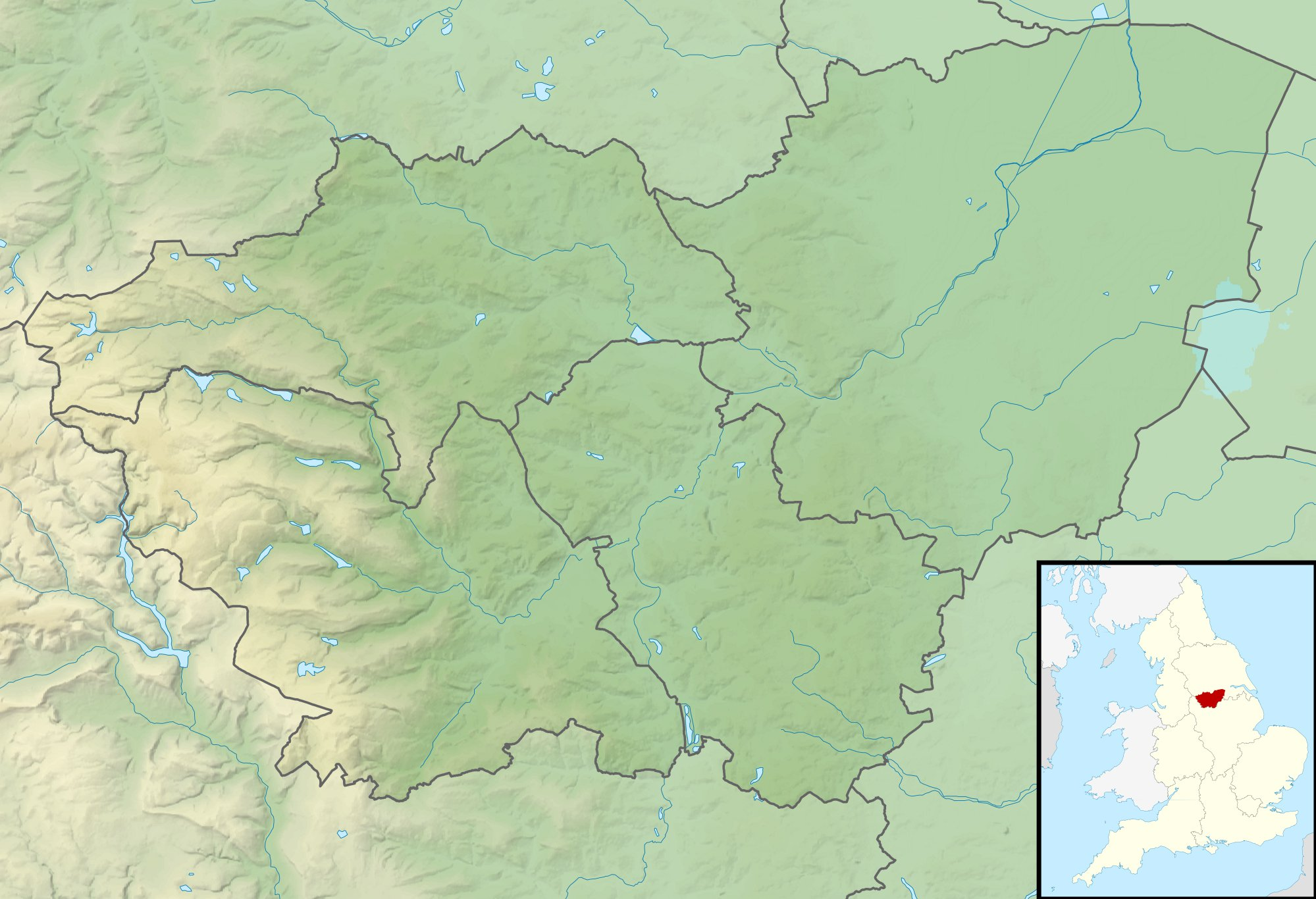
- Location within South Yorkshire
- Location: Loxley, South Yorkshire
- Coordinates: 53.41239°N 1.58474°W
- Type: reservoir
- Basin countries: United Kingdom
- Surface area: 47 ha (120 acres)
- Max. depth: 27 m (89 ft)

Damflask Reservoir is situated at grid reference SK277907 five miles (eight kilometres) west of the centre of Sheffield in the Loxley valley close to the village of Low Bradfield and within the city's boundaries. The hamlet of Stacey Bank is located to the east. The reservoir has a capacity of 4,250.9 million litres (1,123.1 million gallons) and has a surface area of 47 hectares (120 acres) with a maximum depth of 27 metres (89 feet). The dam wall is approximately 400 metres (1,300 feet) wide with a height of 28 metres (92 feet).

== Construction ==
Damflask reservoir was built as one of a group of reservoirs in the Bradfield area (the others being Strines, Agden and Dale Dike reservoirs) to supply both fresh drinking water and a guaranteed supply of running water to the population and industries respectively of Sheffield. It was completed in 1896 with the dam walls being constructed from local stone, and its original purpose was primarily as a compensation reservoir to ensure a continuous flow of water to the River Loxley downstream. It takes its name from Damflask village which was washed away in the Great Sheffield Flood of 11 March 1864; the village stood near the site of the current dam wall and had a public house (Barrell Inn), corn mill, paper mill, wire mill, blacksmith's shop and a few dwellings. The village was never rebuilt after the flood because plans were already in hand to construct Damflask Reservoir.

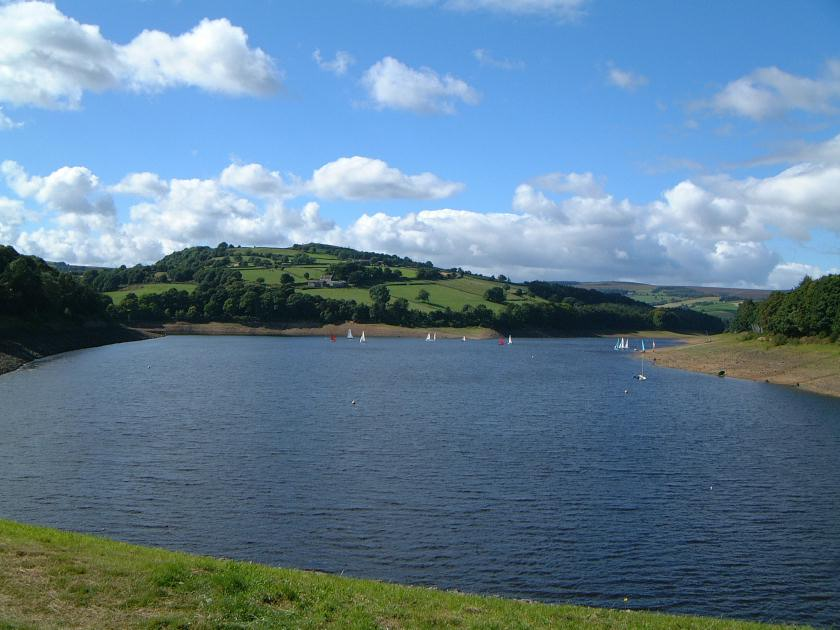
Damflask Reservoir seen from the dam wall with the hill of Ughill Heights in the background.

== Ownership and use ==
Damflask Reservoir was built by the Sheffield Waterworks Company, and is owned today by Yorkshire Water which is part of the Kelda Group; they have opened the facility to various recreational groups. Three rowing clubs (City of Sheffield Rowing Club, Sheffield University Rowing Club, and Sheffield Hallam University Rowing Club) are all active on the reservoir as is the Sheffield Viking Sailing Club and the Sheffield Sea Cadets. It is also open to anglers all the year round who fish mainly for Bream, Pike, Roach and European perch. The woodlands around the reservoir have always been popular with walkers although they were restricted to permitted paths and rights of way for many years. However, in August 2002 Yorkshire Water opened all the area under the Countryside and Rights of Way Act 2000, allowing access to previously restricted areas. A £60,000 project was completed by Yorkshire Water at the start of 2015 to allow better access for disabled people to the circular walking route around the reservoir. This includes widening of access points to allow wheelchair entry, tactile paving and improved information boards.

The Peak District Boundary Walk runs along the south-western edge of the reservoir from Low Bradfield.
