= Yorkshire Water Way =

104-mile footpath in northern England

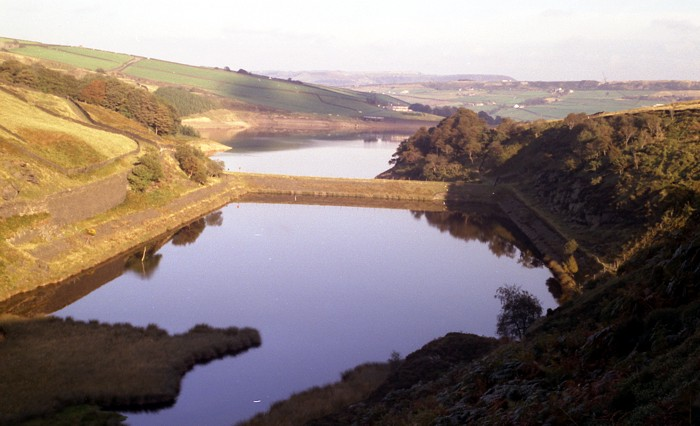
- Bilberry and Digley Reservoirs. The dam wall in the middle is used by as a path by the Yorkshire Water Way
- Length: 104 miles (167 km)
- Location: Yorkshire
- Established: 2006
- Trailheads: Kettlewell, North Yorkshire54.1466°N 2.0491°W; Langsett Reservoir, South Yorkshire; 53.4978°N 1.6789°W
- Use: Hiking
- Maintainer: Yorkshire Water (partial)

The Yorkshire Water Way is a 104-mile (167 km) path that runs from Kettlewell in North Yorkshire to Langsett in South Yorkshire. It was devised by Mark Reid in conjunction with Yorkshire Water (YW) and it passes by more than 20 reservoirs which are operated by Yorkshire Water.

== Background ==
Yorkshire Water is the largest land owner in the Yorkshire and the Humber region, with over 72,000 acres (29,000 ha) and over 100 reservoirs in its portfolio. The Yorkshire Water Way was devised in conjunction with Mark Reid, an established writer and authority on long-distance paths. In 2006, a book was launched to cover the first section between Kettlewell in North Yorkshire and Ilkley in West Yorkshire, with a book covering the southern section following two years later. Yorkshire Water maintain most of the route, though some of the path is on existing routes such as the Pennine Way.

The route is divided into the two stages: Kettlewell to Ilkley (41 miles (66 km)) and Ilkley to Langsett Reservoir (63 miles (101 km)). However, the books guide walkers to be able to complete the walk in stages, or the entire walk takes about seven days to complete.

== Route ==
The route starts in the village of Kettlewell in Upper Wharfedale and heads east over Great Whernside to reach the reservoirs in the Upper Nidderdale area (Angram, Scar House and Gouthwaite). It then heads south through Pateley Bridge and into the Washburn Valley passing Thruscross, Fewston and Swinsty reservoirs. After this it passes over Denton Moor and into West Yorkshire via a footbridge over the River Wharfe into Ilkley, where the first book ends.

South of Ilkley, the trail heads over Ilkley Moor passing Weecher Reservoir and going into the Aire Valley through Shipley, Bingley, Harden, Cullingworth, Cross Roads and Haworth before passing Lower Laithe Reservoir and heading west across Haworth Moor and dropping into Calderdale past the three reservoirs at Walshaw Dean. After this, it heads south past Hebden Bridge and then by Withens Clough, Baitings, Dean Head and Cupwith reservoirs. After Marsden, the walk goes past Butterley, Blakeley, Wessenden and Wessenden Head reservoirs, before crossing the A635 road and going in between Bilberry and Digley Reservoirs. At Holme, the trail goes past Brownhills and Ramsden Reservoir before heading into South Yorkshire in south westerly direction past Harden and Winscar Reservoirs. At Dunford Bridge, the trail goes due east and then south to finish at Langsett Reservoir.

=== Reservoirs ===
Listed north to south (the way that the route is supposed to be taken), this list is of the reservoirs that the route goes past.

- Angram Reservoir
- Scar House Reservoir‡
- Gouthwaite Reservoir‡
- Thruscross Reservoir‡
- Fewston Reservoir‡
- Swinsty Reservoir‡
- Wheecher Reservoir‡
- Lower Laithe Reservoir
- Walshaw Dean Reservoirs (Upper, Middle‡ and Lower‡)
- Gorple Lower Reservoir
- Withens Clough Reservoir‡
- Baitings Reservoir‡
- Booth Wood Reservoir
- Dean Head Reservoir‡
- Cupwith Reservoir‡
- Butterley Reservoir‡
- Blakeley Reservoir‡
- Wessenden Reservoir‡
- Wessenden Head Reservoir‡
- Bilberry Reservoir‡
- Digley Reservoir
- Brownhill Reservoir
- Ramsden Reservoir‡
- Riding Wood Reservoir
- Harden Reservoir‡
- Winscar Reservoir‡
- Upper Windleden Reservoir
- Lower Windleden Reservoir
- Langsett Reservoir‡
- ‡Path goes along the edge of the reservoir or the dam head

== Connecting trails ==
In the Aire Valley, the path connects with the Aire/Calder link section of the Pennine Bridleway and connects with the Pennine Bridleway proper near Hebden Bridge and the Pennine Way in the same location.
