= Agden Reservoir =

Reservoir in South Yorkshire, England

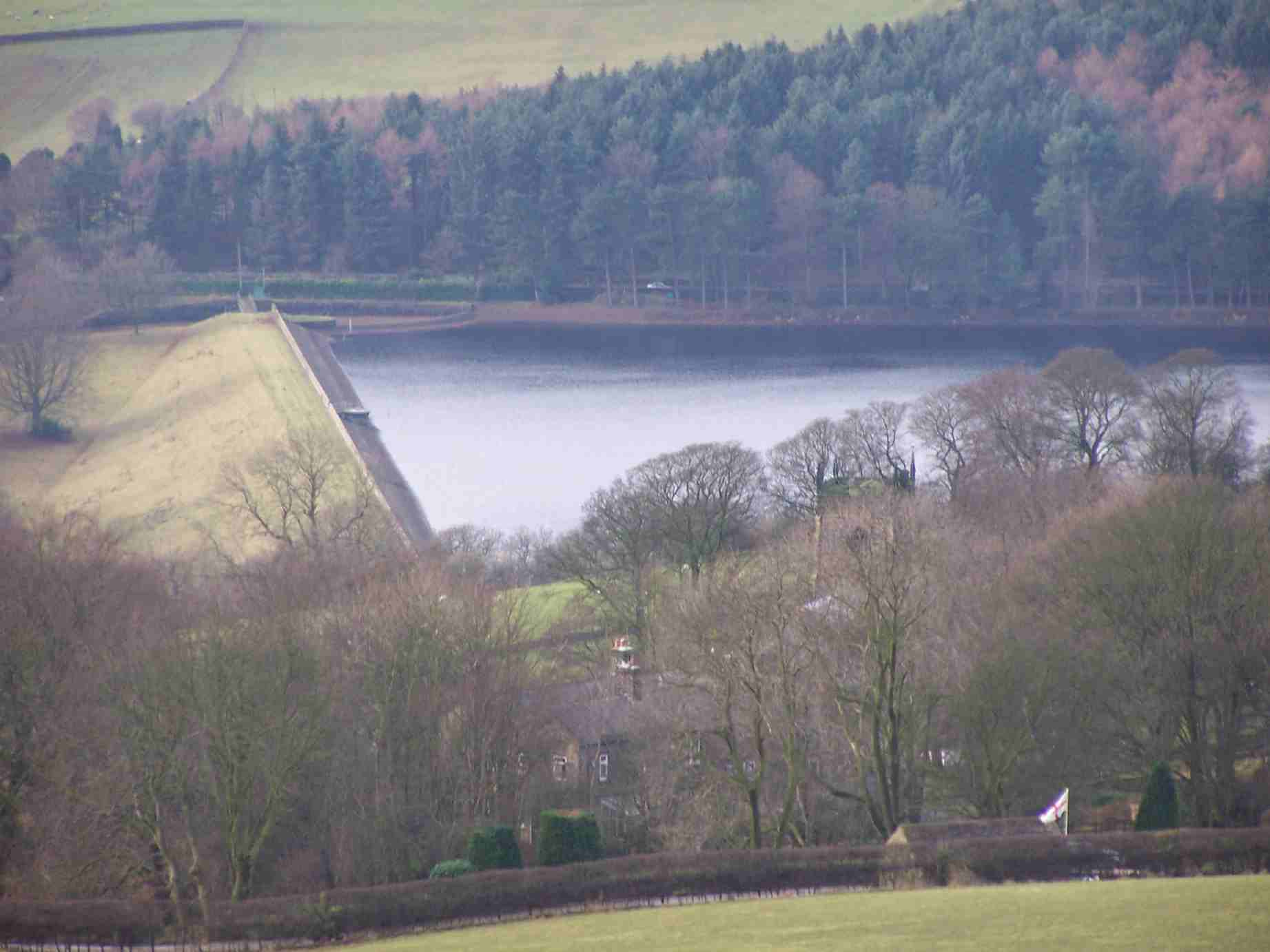
- With the 100 foot (30 m) dam wall. View from High Bradfield

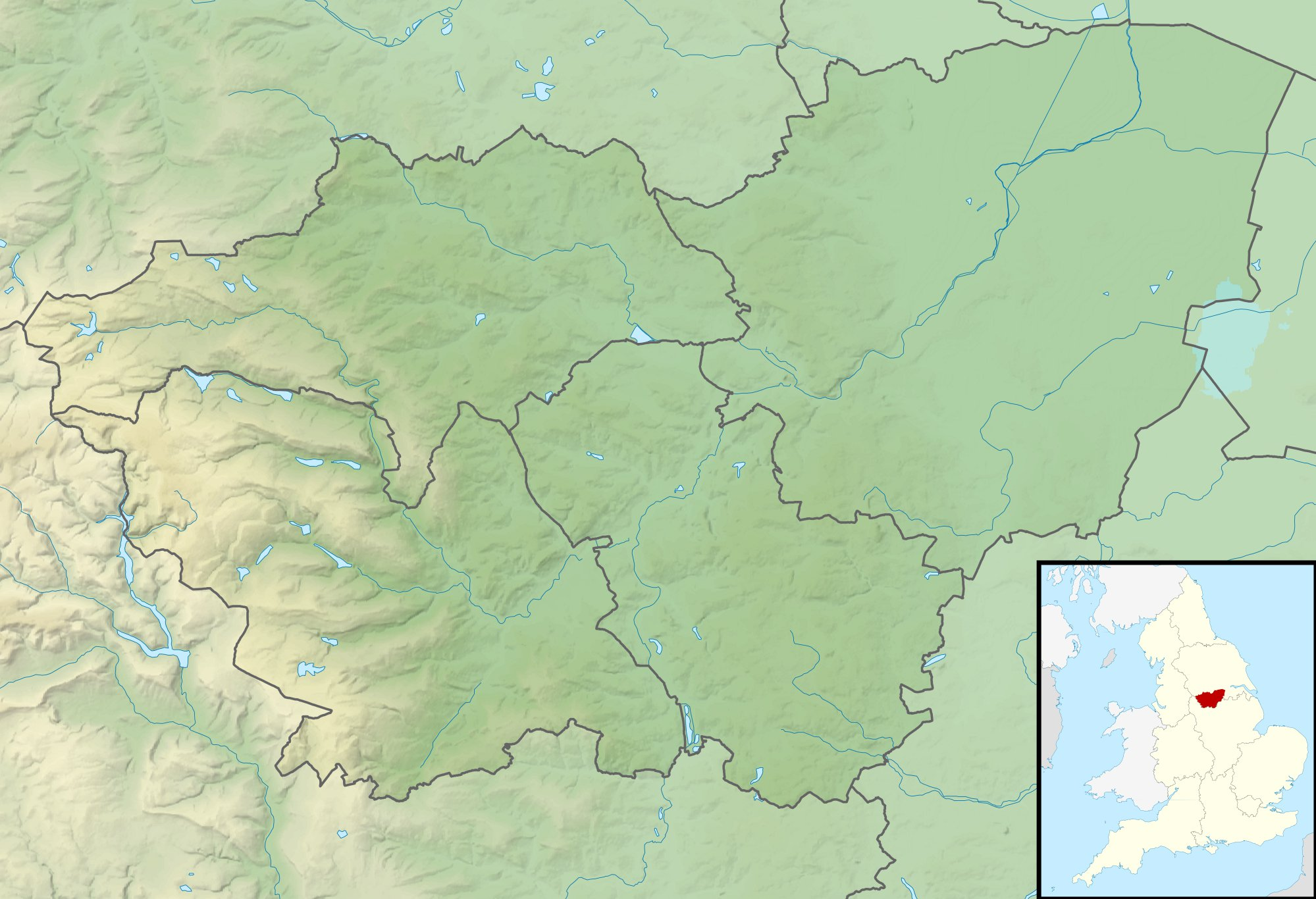
- Location within South Yorkshire
- Location: Bradfield, South Yorkshire
- Coordinates: 53.42865°N 1.61017°W
- Type: Reservoir
- Basin countries: United Kingdom
- Surface area: 25 ha (62 acres)

Agden Reservoir is a water storage reservoir, situated at grid reference SK260925, 6 1/2 miles (10 kilometres) west of the centre of Sheffield, South Yorkshire, England. It is owned by Yorkshire Water / Kelda Group. The reservoir covers an area of 25 hectares (62 acres) and has a capacity of 559 million imperial gallons (2.54 gigalitres) of water; the dam wall has a width of approximately 380 feet (120 m) with a height of 100 feet (30 m). "Agden" means "Valley of the Oak Trees".

The reservoir is one of four built in the second half of the 19th century to satisfy the developing steel industry of Sheffield, collecting water from the moorlands around the village of Low Bradfield, west of Sheffield. The other three being Damflask, Dale Dike and Strines reservoirs. Agden was completed in 1869 and is fed by Hobson Moss Dike and Emlin Dike which flow off the Broomhead and Bradfield moors respectively. The reservoir is surrounded mainly by coniferous woodland, however, Sheffield City Council who own much of the woodland have started a policy of replanting and thinning to encourage broadleaved varieties of trees which give a better habitat for wildlife and also look more attractive.

The reservoir is ringed by a popular walk which starts in the village of Low Bradfield and takes in Agden Bog which is a protected wetland area managed by the Wildlife Trust for Sheffield and Rotherham. The Peak District Boundary Walk runs past the eastern end of the dam. The former Keeper's cottage is at the western side of the dam wall, now a private home, and Agden Lodge built in 1870 for Samuel Fox of Stocksbridge, remains as a private residence. There are also remnants of old farm dwellings around the reservoir - the Water Authorities allegedly had a policy of buying any available property around their reservoirs, solely for demolition, claiming they were a source of possible water contamination. Many fine old buildings were lost to this rationale, including Frost House early-1950s, Rocher Head Farm early-1960s and the 17thC Agden House on the western side, demolished 1972, although it's barn survives. Details of a walk around the reservoir and remaining buildings can be found here:
