= Yorkshire Water =

Water supply and treatment utility company in England

Yorkshire Water Ltd.
- Type: Subsidiary
- Industry: Water industry
- Founded: 1974
- Headquarters: Leeds, England
- Area served: Yorkshire
- Key people: Chairperson - Vanda Murray (2021); CEO - Nicola Shaw (2022)
- Products: Drinking water; Recycled wastewater
- Production output: 1.3 Gl/day (drinking); 1.0 Gl/day (recycled)
- Revenue: £1.1 billion (2020–2021)
- Number of employees: 2,500
- Parent: Kelda Group
- Website: yorkshirewater.com

Yorkshire Water is a British water supply and treatment utility company servicing West Yorkshire, South Yorkshire, the East Riding of Yorkshire, part of North Lincolnshire, most of North Yorkshire and part of Derbyshire, in England. The company has its origins in the Yorkshire Water Authority, one of ten regional water authorities created by the Water Act 1973, and privatised under the terms of the Water Act 1989, when Yorkshire Water plc, the parent company of the Yorkshire Water business, was floated on the London Stock Exchange. The parent company was Kelda Group in 1999. In February 2008, Kelda Group was bought by a consortium of infrastructure funds.

It is regulated under the Water Industry Act 1991.

== Area ==
The company's area includes West Yorkshire, South Yorkshire, the East Riding of Yorkshire, part of North Lincolnshire, most of North Yorkshire and part of Derbyshire. The area is adjoined on the north by that of Northumbrian Water, on the west by United Utilities, on the south west by Severn Trent Water and on the south by Anglian Water. It serves 5.5 million households and 140,000 business customers, and owns over 28,000 hectares (69,000 acres) of land.

== Environmental record ==
Yorkshire Water has received fines for breaches of environmental law. For example:

- Yorkshire Water was fined twice in April 2007. The first offence was for allowing polluting matter to enter Clifton Beck in Brighouse, contrary to section 85(1) of the Water Resources Act 1991. The final incident killed one third of the wildlife along over a mile of the stream. A further incident in the same beck led to a fine of £2,400 in 2004. Yorkshire Water argued that the blockage causing the offence was caused by a third party. Eleven days later, the company was in court again to admit to breaching its discharge consent at its Neiley sewage works, Honley. The discharge consent allowed for biological oxygen demand to exceed 21 mg/L more than three times a year. The Environment Agency demonstrated that the works had breached this limit five times in 2005, resulting in a fine of £16,000 plus £754 in costs.
- Yorkshire Water was fined £6,000 and ordered to pay £9,051 in costs for supplying "unfit water" in May 2006 in a prosecution brought by the Drinking Water Inspectorate, under the Water Industry Act 1991. It pleaded guilty to three offences. Properties in Harlow Moor, Harrogate, had received discoloured water supplies in February 2004, which was caused by work on its supply mains stirring up sediment. About 1,200 properties were affected and 64 customers complained. The Drinking Water Inspectorate said to the ENDS Report that this was not the first time that the company had failed to check valves before working on its distribution mains. Before this incident, the DWI had prosecuted it four times.
- Yorkshire Water's largest fine, of £119,000 (reduced to £80,000 on appeal), with costs of £125,598, was received in December 2000 after pleading guilty to seventeen charges of supplying water unfit for human consumption.
- Yorkshire Water was investigated under caution in October 2008 by the Environment Agency following a leak of sewage into Whitby Harbour. The leak was caused by a pump failure and resulted in sewage leaking into the harbour for 52 hours.

== Performance ==
In June 1996, Yorkshire Water was effectively fined £40 million by the regulator, Ofwat, by freezing their ability to raise bills for customers. This was a result of what Ofwat described as a "failure to deliver the standards required to consumers". This fine was a result of being the most hated water company during the "year of the drought" (1995). However, Yorkshire Water's performance had turned around so much so that the company was awarded the title Utility Company of the Year by Utility Week magazine three years in succession while no other water company has won it more than once." The company has been criticised (2022) for losing 283 million litres of water a day due to leakages. The company says that this is a 50% reduction on the period 1995/96.

=== 1992 Sludge tip blocks River Colne, Huddersfield ===
A landslip of sewage sludge engulfed a sewage works at Huddersfield in 1992. Almost 20,000 tonnes (20,000 long tons; 22,000 short tons) of sewage slipped from its Deighton waste tip on to the plant, and completely blocked 490 feet (150 m) of the River Colne. The disaster also forced the closure of a nearby ICI plant.

=== 1995 Year of Drought ===
For months between September 1995 and January 1996 reservoirs in the west side of the region ran dry, and water had to be taken by (up to) 700 tankers (delivering 70,000 litres (15,000 imp gal; 18,000 US gal) of water a day) from the east side of the region near Goole in a convoy of trucks, with 3,500 daily deliveries along the M62 in a drastic emergency measure which cost £3 million a week, eventually totalling £33 million for the entire tankering operation. The trucks were famously shown on TV delivering water into Booth Wood Reservoir. The company has now built a pipeline from the east to the west to allow the balancing of water levels should the need arise. Following the "year of drought", Yorkshire Water became known as "the most hated water company" during this period, with "staff having to travel in unmarked vans for fear of reprisals". Many suspected Yorkshire Water would never be able to win back customers' trust.

=== 2007 Hull floods ===
The company came under intense criticism when the Bransholme pumping station failed, worsening the flood damage to the city and flooding two thousand homes on the Kingswood and Bransholme estates. The pumping station was upgraded in 2016.

=== 2022 Sheffield gas supply outage ===
Yorkshire Water were criticised in December 2022 when a burst water main operated by the company caused flooding in the Stannington area of Sheffield, which subsequently entered the local gas network and left thousands of properties without a natural gas supply for more than a week amid below-freezing temperatures. The burst water main occurred during the evening of 2 December and leaked more than 400,000 litres of water into the local gas pipe network before finally being fully repaired five days later. Sheffield City Council declared a major incident and aid was distributed to residents as a result of the crisis.

== Customer service ==
Yorkshire Water ranked 11th of 21 water companies in Ofwat's 'Satisfaction by company' survey 2012/13.In January 2015 the UK Customer Service Index (UKCSI) announced that Yorkshire Water was the leader for service in the Utilities sector, they were also the second most improved organisation in the whole UKCSI, beating competitors such as Severn Trent, Anglian, Thames Water as well as United Utilities and EDF.

The UKCSI is the only external measure showing the state of customer satisfaction in the UK and allows individuals to benchmark across all sectors as well as utilities.

== Drinking water quality ==
In the year ending 31 March 2013, 99.93% of Yorkshire Water's samples met the UK standards; in the previous year it was 99.95%.

== Constituents ==
The authority created in 1974 took over the Yorkshire River Authority and the following public sector water supply utilities:

- Barnsley Corporation Waterworks
- Bradford Corporation Waterworks
- Huddersfield Corporation Waterworks
- Kingston upon Hull Corporation Waterworks
- Leeds Corporation Waterworks
- Rotherham Corporation Waterworks
- Scarborough Corporation Waterworks
- Sheffield Corporation Waterworks
- Norton Urban District Council Waterworks
- Rawmarsh Urban District Council Waterworks
- Calderdale Water Board
- Claro Water Board
- Craven Water Board
- Doncaster and District Joint Water Board
- East Yorkshire (Wolds Area) Water Board
- Mid Calder Water Board
- Northallerton and the Dales Water Board
- Pontefract, Goole and Selby Water Board
- Rombalds Water Board
- Ryedale Joint Water Board
- Wakefield and District Water Board

=== York Waterworks Company ===
In early 1999 the company took over York Waterworks Company, a small water-only company serving the city of York. It had been founded in 1846 as the York New Waterworks Company.

=== Predecessor borough waterworks ===
==== Barnsley Corporation Waterworks ====
The Barnsley Local Board of Health established a waterworks using powers in the Barnsley Local Board Act 1862 (25 & 26 Vict. c. xxxii).

The Barnsley Waterworks Company was established by the Barnsley Water Act 1837 (7 Will. 4 & 1 Vict. c. lxxxii).

==== Bradford Corporation Waterworks ====
Bradford Corporation Waterworks was created by the Bradford Corporation Waterworks Act 1854 (17 & 18 Vict. c. cxxix).

The Bradford Waterworks Company was established by the Bradford Waterworks Act 1854 (5 & 6 Vict. c. vi)

==== Huddersfield Corporation Waterworks ====
Huddersfield Corporation Waterworks was formed when the Huddersfield Water Act 1869 (32 & 33 Vict. c. cx) vested the undertaking of the Huddersfield Waterworks Commissioners in the corporation.

Wessenden Reservoir was bought by the corporation under the Huddersfield Corporation Waterworks Act 1890 (53 & 54 Vict. c. cxv). They had offices in Water Street, Huddersfield, built in 1828.

The Huddersfield Waterworks Commissioners were created by the Huddersfield Water Act 1827 (7 & 8 Geo. 4. c. 84).

==== Hull Corporation Waterworks ====
Hull Corporation Waterworks was created by the Kingston-upon-Hull Water Act 1843 (6 & 7 Vict. c. lxxiii).

The Newington Water Company was established by the Newington Water Order 1875, and taken over by Hull Corporation Waterworks on 1 October 1893.

==== Leeds Corporation Waterworks ====
Leeds Corporation took over the private Leeds Waterworks Company by the Leeds Waterworks (Wharfe Supply) Act 1852 (15 & 16 Vict. c. cii).

The Leeds Waterworks Act 1867 (30 & 31 Vict. c. cxli) authorised the building of three reservoirs at Fewston Lindley Wood and Swinsty.

The Leeds Waterworks Company was incorporated by the Leeds Waterworks Act 1837 (7 Will. 4 & 1 Vict. c. lxxxiii).

==== Scarborough Corporation Waterworks ====
Scarborough Corporation Waterworks was established when the Scarborough Corporation Water Act 1878 (41 & 42 Vict. c. lxxv) enabled Scarborough Corporation to purchase the private Scarborough Waterworks Company.

The Scarborough Waterworks Company was incorporated by the Scarborough and Falsegrave Water Act 1845 (8 & 9 Vict. c. lxviii).

Scarborough Waterworks Company purchased the Scalby Water Company by the Scarborough Waterworks Amendment Act 1878 (41 & 42 Vict. c. l).

Under the Scarborough Water Order 1961 (SI 1961/1151), Scarborough Corporation Waterworks purchased the private Whitby Waterworks Company, acquiring its Randy Mere Reservoir.

The Whitby Waterworks Company was formed by the Whitby Waterworks Act 1851 (14 & 15 Vict. c. xxxvi).

==== Sheffield Corporation Waterworks ====
Sheffield Water Act 1830
- Act of Parliament
- Parliament of the United Kingdom
- Long title: An Act for better supplying with Water the Town and Parish of Sheffield, in the County of York.
- Citation: 11 Geo. 4 & 1 Will. 4. c. lv

Dates
- Royal assent: 29 May 1830

Text of statute as originally enacted

The private Sheffield Waterworks Company was incorporated by the Sheffield Water Act 1830 (11 Geo. 4 & 1 Will. 4. c. lv), taking over a number of smaller water suppliers that existed at that time.

In 1833, Hadfield Dam (originally named Pisgah Dam) was created in Crookes to provide a service reservoir. The three large Redmires Reservoirs were then complied in 1836, 1849 and 1854. The Rivelin Dams were created in 1848 to provide compensation water.

The Sheffield Waterworks Act 1853 (16 & 17 Vict. c. xxii) authorised the company to raise more money, and the building of Dale Dike, Agden and Strines reservoirs on the River Loxley.

In 1864 the dam of Dale Dike Reservoir failed, causing the Great Sheffield Flood.

The company built offices in Division Street, Sheffield in 1869. These are now a J D Wetherspoons public house.

The Sheffield Waterworks (Amendment) Act 1867 (30 & 31 Vict. c. lxxxvii) obliged the company to start to provide a continuous water supply from July 1869. The company failed to do this, which led to Sheffield Corporation beginning attempts to take over the service. The achieved this with the passing of the Sheffield Corporation (Water) Act 1887 (50 & 51 Vict. c. clxxviii), which allowed the Sheffield Corporation Waterworks Department to take over the company's operation for a cost of £2,092,014 (equivalent to £238 million in 2025).

The undertaking of the Dearne Valley Water Board was transferred to Sheffield Corporation Waterworks by the Sheffield Water (Dearne Valley) Order 1963 (SI 1963/572).

The Dearne Valley Water Board was constituted by the Dearne Valley Water Act 1920 (10 & 11 Geo. 5. c. lxxiv), taking over the private Dearne Valley Waterworks Company.

The Dearne Valley Waterworks Company was incorporated by the Dearne Valley Waterworks Act 1880 (43 & 44 Vict. c. cxvi).

=== Predecessor water boards ===
==== Calderdale Water Board ====
Calderdale Water Board was created by the Calderdale Water Board Order 1961 (SI 1961/623). It covered Halifax, Brighouse, and the Calder Valley, and had offices on Thrum Hall Lane, Halifax.

Halifax Corporation Waterworks was created in 1848 when Halifax became a municipal borough, taking over the water undertaking of Halifax Improvement Commissioners created by the Halifax (Water Supply) Act 1762 (2 Geo. 3. c. 40).

==== Claro Water Board ====
The Claro Water Board was constituted by the Claro Water Board Order 1958 (SI 1958/1808). It had offices in Woodfield Gardens, Harrogate. It took over the Harrogate Corporation Waterworks, the Ripon Corporation Waterworks and the Wetherby District Water Company.

Harrogate Corporation Waterworks was formed when Harrogate Corporation took over the private Harrowgate Water Company under the Harrogate Corporation (Waterworks Transfer) Act 1897 (60 & 61 Vict. c. ccxxxvii). After the passing of the Harrogate Water Act 1903 (3 Edw. 7. c. xxxvii), Harrogate Corporation Waterworks took over the Knaresborough Waterworks.

The Harrogate Waterworks Company was established by the Harrogate Waterworks Act 1846 (9 & 10 Vict. c. cxiii).

The Ripon Corporation Waterworks had supplied water to Ripon.

The Wetherby District Water Company was formed by the Wetherby District Water Act 1899 (62 & 63 Vict. c. lxxii).

==== Craven Water Board ====
The Craven Water Board was constituted by the Craven Water Board Order 1959 (SI 1959/433). It took over Keighley Corporation Waterworks and Barnoldswick Urban District Council's water undertaking.

The Keighley Local Board of Health bought the private Keighley Waterworks Company under the Keighley Waterworks and Improvement Act 1867 and is based at Marley. (30 & 31 Vict. c. liv).

The Keighley Waterworks Company was established by the Keighley Water Act 1816 (56 Geo. 3. c. xliii).

==== Doncaster and District Joint Water Board ====
The Doncaster and District Joint Water Board was constituted by the Doncaster and District Joint Water Board Order 1962 (SI 1962/1924). It took over Doncaster Corporation Waterworks.

Doncaster Corporation Waterworks was established by the Doncaster Corporation Waterworks Act 1873 (36 & 37 Vict. c. cxxix).

==== East Yorkshire (Wolds Area) Water Board ====
The East Yorkshire (Wolds Area) Water Board was constituted by the East Yorkshire (Wolds Area) Water Board Order 1961 (SI 1961/2399).

==== Mid Calder Water Board ====
The Mid Calder Water Board was constituted by the Mid Calder Water Board Order 1965 (SI 1965/2006).

Batley Corporation Waterworks was created under the Batley Corporation Waterworks Act 1871 (34 & 35 Vict. c. xl), when Batley Corporation left the Dewsbury, Batley and Heckmondwike Waterworks, and set up their own waterworks.

The Dewsbury and Heckmondwike Waterworks Board was formed by the Dewsbury and Heckmondwike Waterworks Act 1876 (39 & 40 Vict. c. clxxxv) from Dewsbury, Batley, and Heckmondwike Waterworks, following the departure of Batley.

The Dewsbury, Batley, and Heckmondwike Waterworks was created by the Dewsbury, Batley and Heckmondwike Waterworks Act 1856 (19 & 20 Vict. c. xxxvi) as an undertaking jointly owned by the local boards of Dewsbury, Batley and Heckmondwike. It took over the existing Dewsbury Local Board of Health water undertaking authorised by the Dewsbury Waterworks Act 1853 (16 & 17 Vict. c. cxxvii).

==== Northallerton and the Dales Water Board ====
The Northallerton and the Dales Water Board was constituted by the Northallerton and the Dales Water Board Order 1962 (SI 1963/261). It took over the water undertaking of the Northallerton Urban District which had been authorised by the Northallerton Waterworks Act 1909 (54 & 55 Vict. c. cxxxiv).

==== Pontefract, Goole and Selby Water Board ====
Pontefract, Goole and Selby Water Board was created by the Pontefract, Google and Selby Water Board Order 1961 (SI 1961/1447). It had waterworks at Pollington, with water obtained from the red sandstone via boreholes.

==== Rombalds Water Board ====
Rombalds Water Board was constituted by the Rombalds Water Board Order 1962 (SI 1962/271). It had reservoirs on Rombalds Moor.

The Yeadon Waterworks Company had been formed by the Yeadon Waterworks Act 1870 (33 & 34 Vict. c. xxiv).

Menstone Rural District Council purchased the Menstone Waterworks Company by the Menstone Waterworks (Transfer) Act 1900 (63 & 64 Vict. c. xli).

==== Wakefield and District Water Board ====
Wakefield and District Water Board was formed by the Wakefield and District Water Board Order 1961 (SI 1961/1299), succeeding Wakefield Corporation Waterworks, initially inheriting their offices at 21 King Street, Wakefield. In 1966 the water board moved to new offices on the corner of George Street and Southgate.

Wakefield Corporation Waterworks was formed by the Wakefield Improvement Act 1877 (40 & 41 Vict. c. cxcvii), taking over the private Wakefield Waterworks Company.

The Wakefield Waterworks Company was formed by the Wakefield Water Act 1837 (7 Will. 4 & 1 Vict. c. lv).

== Reservoirs ==
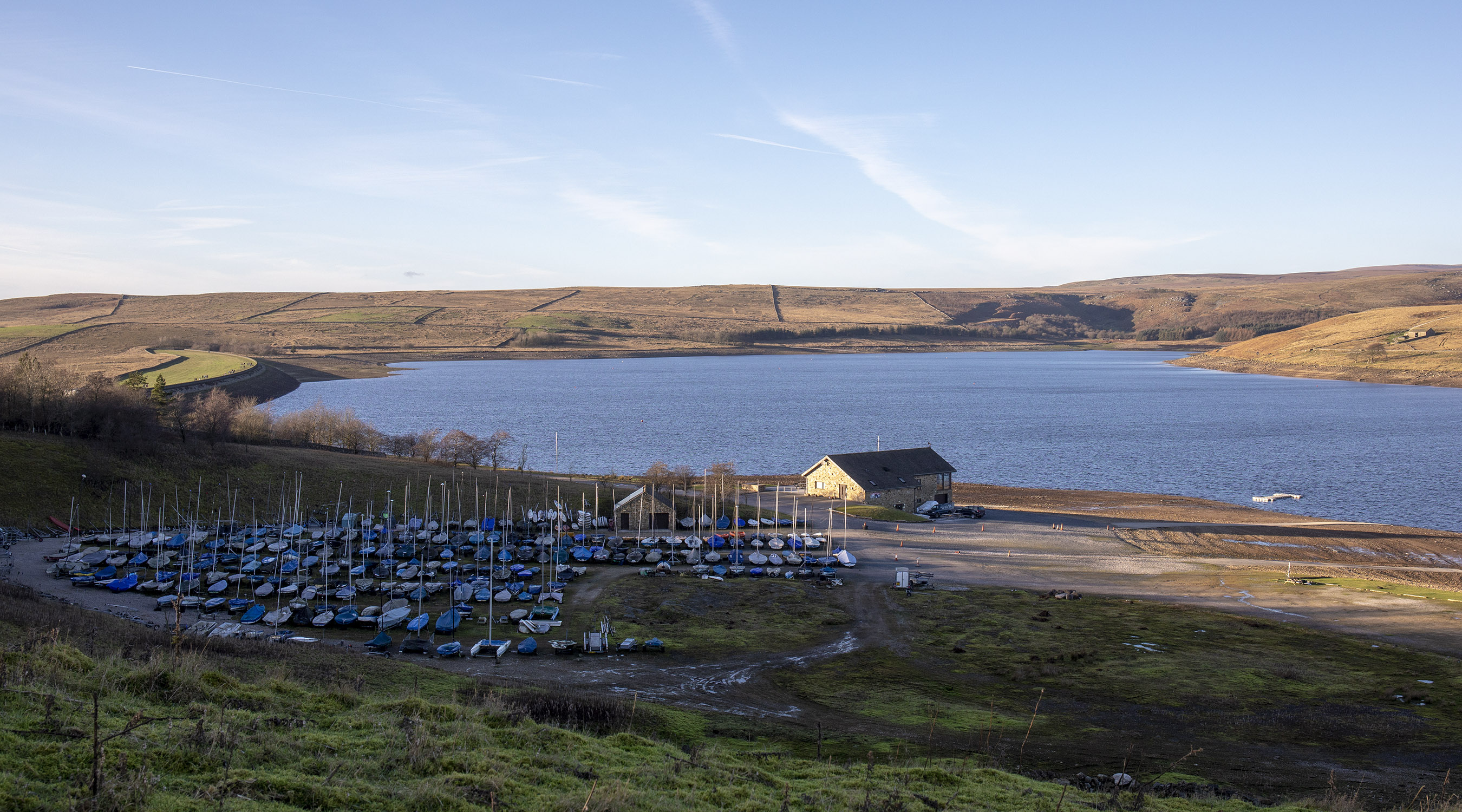
Yorkshire Dales Sailing Club at Grimwith Reservoir

Yorkshire Water allows recreational use of some of 113 of its 120+ reservoirs. Activities include walking, fishing, horse riding, cycling, water sports and bird watching. Several sailing clubs are afforded the use of certain reservoirs for their sailing activities, including Boshaw Whams, Embsay, Grimwith, Ponden, Scar House, Thornton Steward, and Warley Moor Reservoirs.

Since privatisation of the water authorities in 1989, Yorkshire Water has made many of its locations accessible to the public, which not only cover water, but woodland and moorland. Walks exist around Brayton Barff, Fewston, Grimwith, Langsett, More Hall, Scammoden, Thruscross, and Undebank reservoirs. Additionally, in 2008, Yorkshire Water teamed up with long-distance walking writer Mark Reid to create the Yorkshire Water Way, a 103-mile (166 km) walk which takes in Yorkshire Water Reservoirs along its route.

- Agden Reservoir
- Angram Reservoir
- Baitings Reservoir
- Beaver Dyke Reservoirs
- Bilberry Reservoir
- Blackmoorfoot Reservoir
- Blakeley Reservoir
- Booth Wood Reservoir
- Boshaw Whams Reservoir
- Brayton Barff
- Broadstones Reservoir
- Broomhead Reservoir
- Brownhill Reservoir
- Butterley Reservoir
- Carr Bottom Reservoir
- Chelker Reservoir
- Cod Beck Reservoir
- Cupwith Reservoir
- Dale Dike Reservoir
- Damflask Reservoir
- Dean Head Reservoir
- Deer Hill Reservoir
- Digley Reservoir
- Doe Park Reservoir
- East Ardsley Reservoir
- Eccup Reservoir
- Embsay Reservoir
- Fewston Reservoir
- Gorple Reservoir
- Gouthwaite Reservoir
- Graincliffe Reservoir
- Grimwith Reservoir
- Harden Clough Reservoir
- Haworth Moor Reservoir
- Hewenden Reservoir
- Holme Styes Reservoir
- Ingbirchworth Reservoir
- Keighley Moor Reservoir
- Langsett Reservoir
- Leeshaw Reservoir
- Leighton Reservoir
- Longwood Reservoir
- Lower Barden Reservoir
- Lower Laithe Reservoir
- Lower Windelden Reservoir
- Manshead Reservoir
- March Ghyll Reservoir
- Midhope Reservoir
- More Hall Reservoir
- Ogden Reservoir
- Ponden Reservoir
- Ramsden Wood Reservoir
- Randy Mere Reservoir
- Redmires Reservoirs
- Reva Reservoir
- Ringstone Edge Reservoir
- Rivelin Reservoirs
- Roundhill Reservoir
- Royd Moor Reservoir
- Ryburn Reservoir
- Scammonden Reservoir
- Scargill Reservoir
- Scar House Reservoir
- Scout Dike Reservoir
- Swinsty Reservoir
- Thornton Steward Reservoir
- Thruscross Reservoir
- Timble Reservoir
- Tophill Low Reservoir and Nature Reserve
- Underbank Reservoir
- Upper Barden Reservoir
- Upper Windleden Reservoir
- Walshaw Dean Reservoirs
- Watersheddles Reservoir (in Lancashire, but supplies West Yorkshire)
- Wessendean Head Reservoir
- Wessenden Reservoir
- Wheecher Reservoir
- Whinney Gill Reservoir
- Widdop Reservoir
- Winscar Reservoir
- Withens Clough Reservoir
- Yateholme Reservoir
