= Nicola Shaw =

CEO of Yorkshire Water utility company

Nicola Shaw CBE
- Education: Croydon High School; The King's School, Canterbury
- Alma mater: University of Oxford; Massachusetts Institute of Technology
- Employer: Yorkshire Water

Nicola Shaw CBE is the chief executive officer at Yorkshire Water. She has previously held roles as the executive officer at National Grid, the chief executive of High Speed 1, and director of FirstGroup. She was appointed a CBE in the Queen's New Year's Honours List 2016.

== Education ==
Shaw attributes her fascination with transport to her father, a stockbroker who commuted to London Bridge from Oxted in Surrey. She attended Croydon High School and The King's School, Canterbury. Shaw studied History and Economics at Lincoln College, Oxford. In 1995 she completed a Master of Science in Transportation degree at the Massachusetts Institute of Technology.

== Career ==
Shaw joined Transport for London in 1990. She was partly responsible for the Stratford bus station, the first not to be constructed of red brick. Shaw then completed a master's degree in interdepartmental transport at the Massachusetts Institute of Technology. The program focused on civil engineering, the importance of transport and teamwork. In 1995 Shaw joined World Bank. She worked at Halcrow Group, where she advised Dubai, Singapore and Malaysia on transport projects. She returned to the UK in 1999, where she was deputy chief economist and director of Access, Competition and Licensing at the Office of the Rail Regulator. In 2002 she joined Bechtel to lead business development.

In 2003 she was appointed managing director of operations at the Strategic Rail Authority, where she was responsible for the contractual negotiations between the government and private sector train operators. She joined FirstGroup in 2005, where she was managing director of the bus division. From 2005 to 2010, she was responsible for 25,000 staff in the bus division and £1.3 billion in revenue.

Between 2010 and 2015 she was a non-executive director of Aer Lingus. In 2011 she became chief executive of High Speed 1, where she transformed the project from construction into a long-term business. Shaw was responsible for customer relations, including St Pancras railway station and Stratford International station.

In the 2015 Summer Budget she was tasked to write a report on how to "fix Network Rail". She published the Shaw Report in 2016, which made several recommendations for the future of British Transport:

- Passengers and freight shippers to be at the heart of Infrastructure management
- Focus on customers with deeper route devolution with independent regulation – splitting Network Rail into nine different groups, each with greater autonomy over construction and maintenance
- Create a route for the North
- Clarify governmental role in railway and Network Rail
- Explore new ways for financing growth in freight and passengers
- Industry-wide plans to develop skills and diversity

Patrick McLoughlin said publicly that he "welcomes Ms Shaw’s suggestions". When asked by Rail Professional what it was like to be a woman working on the railway, Shaw replied "I have no idea what it's like to be a woman in this industry because I've always been one and I've always been in transport ... People do ask that question but if I asked you what is it like to be a man in the rail industry, you would give me the same answer, I think."

In March 2016 Shaw was appointed executive director at National Grid plc. She is interested in how the patterns of energy use are changing, and was working on improving transparency and efficiency in energy balancing and the transmission network (National Grid). She is working with DeepMind to use Artificial intelligence in the future of Utilities. She worked to improve diversity at National Grid plc, where 30% of senior management are women. In May 2022, she was appointed as the chief executive officer of Yorkshire Water.

Shaw received a CBE for services to transport in the Queen's New Year Honours in 2016. She has been a non-executive director of the International Consolidated Airlines Group since January 2018.

== Controversy ==
According to investigative journalism published in the UK's Guardian newspaper in August 2025, as chief executive officer at Yorkshire Water, Shaw reportedly received bonuses amounting to £1.3m in previously undisclosed extra pay in the 2023-24 and the 2024-25 financial years via an offshore parent company, Kelda Holdings. Yorkshire Water is one of six companies banned by the UK government from awarding bonuses to its bosses after environmental breaches. It paid £40m in March 2025 for storm overflow spills resulting from poor maintenance practices and was fined £850,000 in late July 2025 for pumping chlorinated water into a stream in 2017. Shaw was appointed in 2022.
