= Randy Mere Reservoir =

Reservoir in North Yorkshire, England

- Location within North Yorkshire
- Location: Beck Hole, North Yorkshire
- Coordinates: 54.405°N 0.752°W
- Type: Reservoir
- Catchment area: 9 hectares (22 acres)
- Basin countries: England
- Managing agency: Yorkshire Water
- Built: 1884
- Max. length: 270 metres (300 yd)
- Surface area: 2 hectares (4.9 acres)
- Average depth: 3.5 metres (11 ft)
- Water volume: 62,031 cubic metres (2,190,600 cu ft)
- Surface elevation: 177 metres (581 ft)

Randy Mere Reservoir (also known as Randymere Reservoir), is a freshwater reservoir owned and operated by Yorkshire Water, near Beck Hole, in North Yorkshire, England. The reservoir was built in the 1880s by Whitby Water Company and holds about 62,000 cubic metres (2,200,000 cu ft) of water. The reservoir is built on an overflow channel for the proglacial Lake Eskdale, and before being converted into a reservoir, the area was a tarn and a marsh that was used as a commercial leech fishery.

== History ==
Whitby Waterworks Act 1864
- Act of Parliament
- Parliament of the United Kingdom
- Long title: An Act to enable "The Whitby Waterworks Company (Limited)" to supply with Water the Town and Borough of Whitby, and the Neighbourhood thereof, in the Parish of Whitby in the North Riding of the County of York; and for other Purposes.
- Citation: 27 & 28 Vict. c. ccix

Dates
- Royal assent: 25 July 1864

Text of statute as originally enacted

Whitby Water Act 1895
- Act of Parliament
- Parliament of the United Kingdom
- Long title: An Act to sanction certain Works constructed by and Expenditure of the Whitby Waterworks Company to make void a certain Deed of Grant to confer further Powers on the Company and for other purposes.
- Citation: 58 & 59 Vict. c. xxxvii

Dates
- Royal assent: 30 May 1895

Text of statute as originally enacted

The Whitby Waterworks Act 1864 (27 & 28 Vict. c. ccix) authorised the building of a reservoir on Randy Mere. The right to take water from the springs in the Hazel Head area (which feed the reservoir) were acquired in 1871, and in 1884, the reservoir was constructed by Edward Easton & Company with two earthen embankments, one at either end of the reservoir, each being 75 yards (69 m) in width, and 300 yards (270 m) between them. The reservoir was built on an existing tarn and marshy ground that was once the site of a commercial leech fishery; locals would wade through the marsh with bare legs and then remove any leeches which had attached themselves to their bare skin. Soon after the opening of the reservoir, water was seen to be leaking from the sandstone around the dam. The {Whitby Waterworks Company had to repair this leak by applying puddle clay walls to the reservoir, but first, they had to prove that the new works, and the original works, were granted under the Whitby Waterworks Act 1864 that gave the water rights for Hazel Head Springs. This was granted under the Whitby Water Act 1895 (58 & 59 Vict. c. xxxvii). Eventually, bituminous sheeting was laid on the bed of the reservoir to stop it seeping between 110,000 imperial gallons (500,000 L; 130,000 US gal) and 250,000 imperial gallons (1,100,000 L; 300,000 US gal) per day. These works were completed in 1900 at a cost of £9,000 (equivalent to £956,000 in 2025).

During the rebuilding of 1895, the water supply to Whitby continued through the outfall pipe which bypassed the reservoir, and ran direct to a storage reservoir at Sneaton Castle in Whitby, though fresh water was restricted overnight. The rebuilding process also involved cosmetically altering the sides of the reservoir which had been left with boulders jutting out at all angles. The reservoir was refurbished and cleaned in 1971 to a cost of £45,520 (equivalent to £575,000 in 2025), and by this point it was in the control of Scarborough Corporation Waterworks, and then in 1973, it became an asset of Yorkshire Water.

Ordnance Survey mapping lists the lake as Randy Mere, but Randymere is also used frequently. The reservoir sits on an old overflow channel from the proglacial Lake Eskdale, and so became a marshy area; and because of this, it was historically known as Randay Mire, though it has also been recorded as Randay Mere and Raynday Mere. The name derives from Old English meaning either brink, edge, margin or shore. The reservoir is on Egton High Moor, close to the hamlet of Beck Hole, about 6 miles (9.7 km) south-west of Sleights.

Randy Mere is open for angling, with rainbow and brown trout in the reservoir. Permits are issued for fishing between June and October by the Egton Estate, who used to own the land the tarn was once on, but they sold it to the waterworks company whilst retaining the fishing rights.
