= Wessenden Valley =

Valley in West Yorkshire, England

Geography
- Country: England
- Coordinates: 53.586°N 1.929°W
- Interactive map of Wessenden Valley

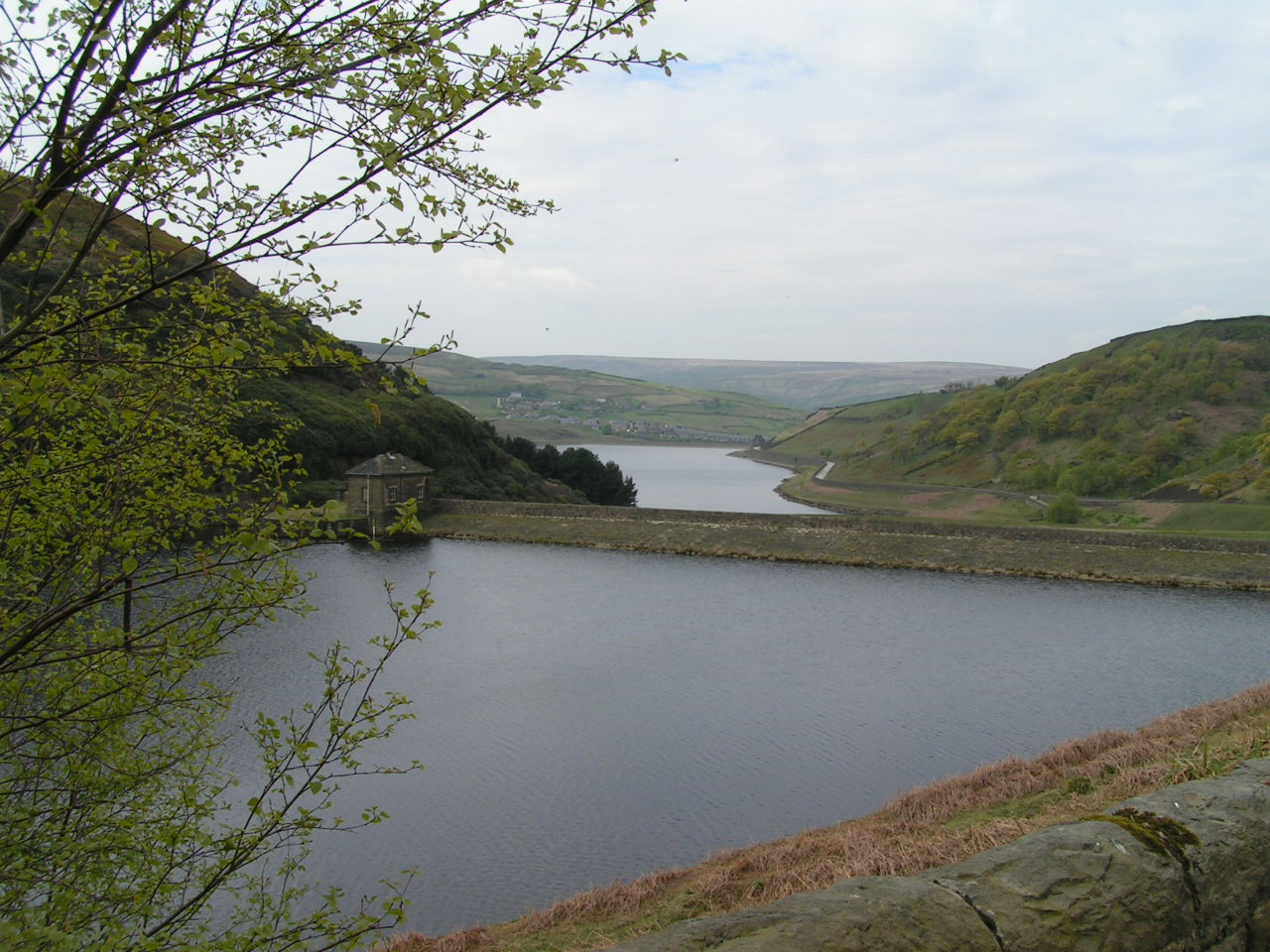
Blakeley (foreground) and Butterley Reservoirs, May 2005

The Wessenden Valley is a moorland valley in the Dark Peak, immediately south of Marsden in West Yorkshire, England. The name Wessenden derives from Old English and means the 'valley with rock suitable for whetstones'. The valley was formed by retreating glaciers at the end of the last ice age and continues to be cut by the Wessenden Brook a tributary of the River Colne with a catchment of 6.28 square miles (16.27 km^{2}).

The valley is in the Marsden Moor Estate and occupied by four reservoirs, namely Wessenden Head, Wessenden, Blakeley and Butterley, the largest. The Kirklees Way and Pennine Way long-distance footpaths follow the valley. The upper part of the valley near Wessenden Head is managed by the National Trust as part of the 5,000-acre (2,000 ha) Marsden Moor Estate.

The area around the head of the valley, near the junction of the A365 and Wessenden Head Road, is locally known as the Isle of Skye. The area was a popular walking destination in Victorian times.

Butterley Reservoir's spillway, the only one of its kind in England, was a Grade II listed structure until Yorkshire Water renovated it using concrete after winning a case on appeal.
