= Wessenden Reservoir =

Reservoir in Yorkshire, England

- Wessenden Old Reservoir
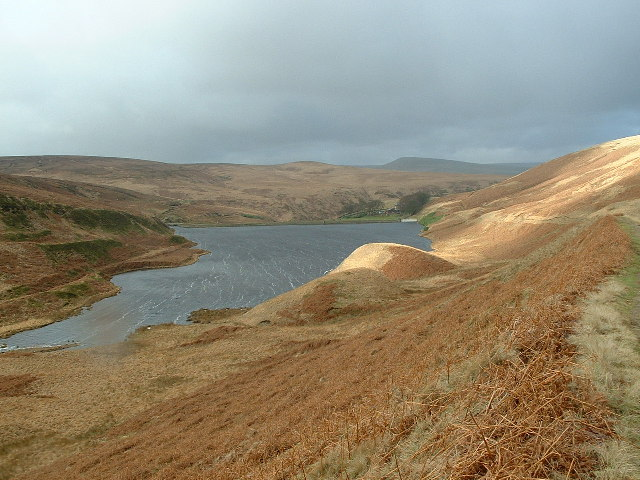

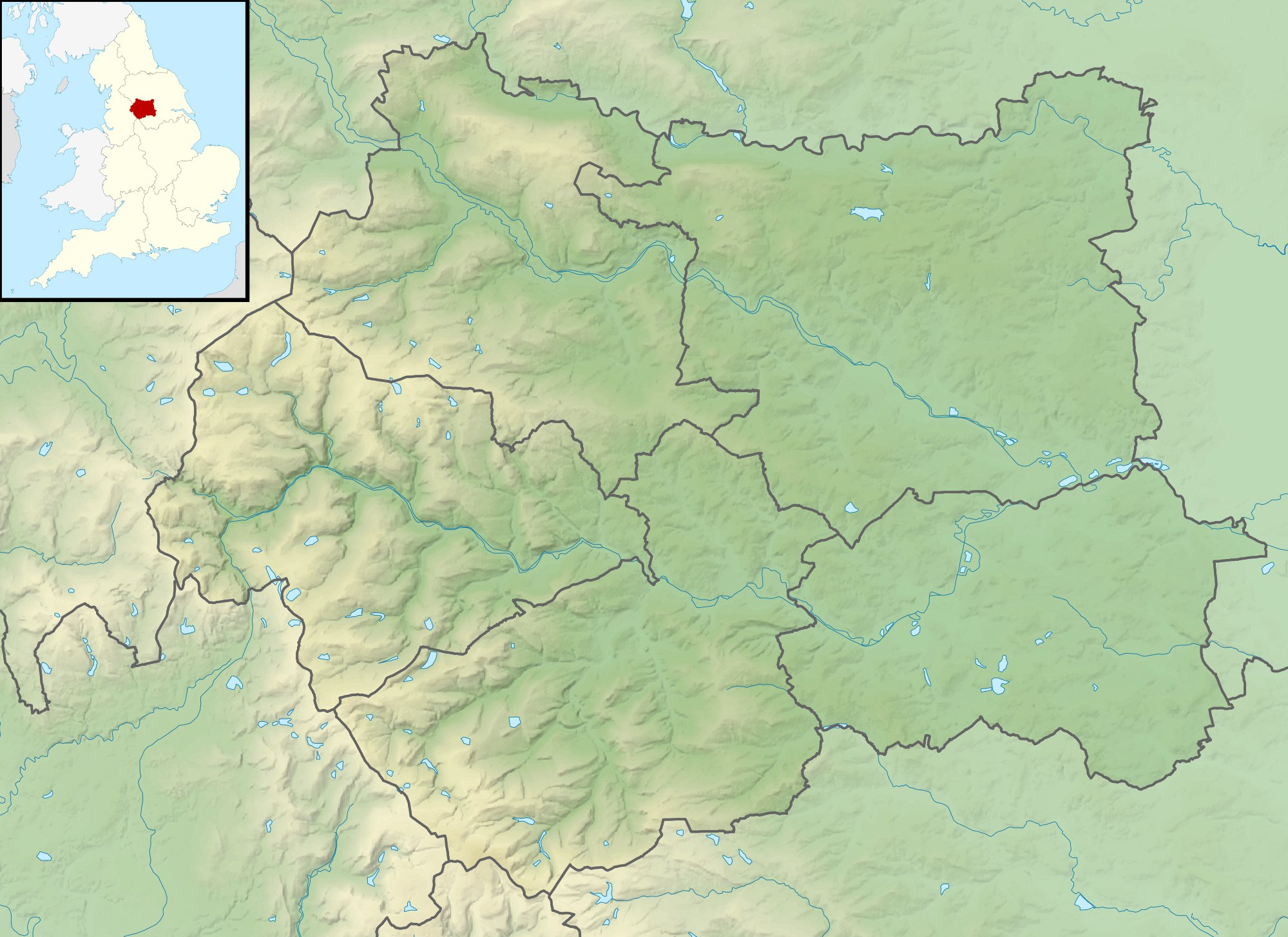
- Location within West Yorkshire
- Location: West Yorkshire
- Coordinates: 53.574°N 1.913°W
- Type: reservoir
- Primary inflows: Wessenden Brook
- Primary outflows: Wessenden Brook
- Basin countries: United Kingdom
- Built: 1836
- Max. length: 0.5 kilometres (0.3 mi)
- Max. width: 250 metres (820 ft)
- Water volume: 486,430 cubic metres (107,000,000 imp gal)
- Surface elevation: 299 metres (981 ft)

Wessenden Reservoir is the second in a series of four reservoirs in the Wessenden Valley above the village of Marsden in West Yorkshire, at the northern end of the Peak District National Park.

Wessenden Valley Reservoir Embankment Act 1836
- Act of Parliament
- Parliament of the United Kingdom
- Long title: An Act for enlarging the Embankment of a Reservoir in the Valley of Wessenden in the Township of Marsden and Parish of Almondbury in the West Riding of the County of York, and for other Purposes.
- Citation: 6 & 7 Will. 4. c. xciv

Dates
- Royal assent: 4 July 1836

Other legislation
- Repealed by: West Yorkshire Act 1980

Status: Repealed

Text of statute as originally enacted

Following the Wessenden Valley Reservoir Embankment Act 1836 (6 & 7 Will. 4. c. xciv), the Wessenden Commissioners (formally, "The Commissioners of the Wessenden Reservoir"), were established to build Wessenden Reservoir, to supply water to power the mills further down the valley and to protect people and property from floods. The reservoir was created by the construction of an earth embankment across Wessenden Brook. The reservoir ran dry during droughts in 1852, 1864 and 1865. The Huddersfield Corporation Waterworks Act 1890 (53 & 54 Vict. c. cxv) led to Huddersfield Corporation purchasing the reservoir from the Wessenden Commissioners in order to supply drinking water to the town.

Wessenden Reservoir has a storage capacity of 107,000,000 imperial gallons (490,000,000 L). The reservoir is currently owned and operated by Yorkshire Water.

The Wessenden Valley Woodland Project was initiated in 2017 to develop natural habitats with increased biodiversity.

The Pennine Way long-distance footpath runs along the northern side of the reservoir and its dam. The Peak District Boundary Walk long-distance trail also passes the northern end of the dam.

== See also ==
- Yorkshire Water Way
