= Booth Wood Reservoir =

Reservoir in West Yorkshire, England

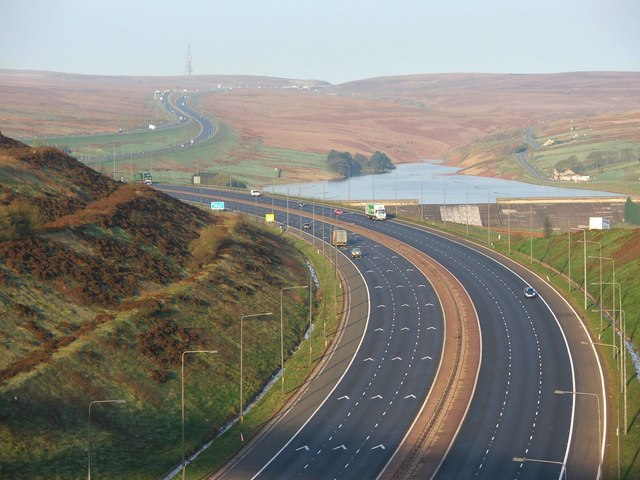
- The view from Scammonden Bridge looking westwards towards Rishworth Moor. The M62 is in the foreground with Booth Wood Reservoir in the middle of the image.

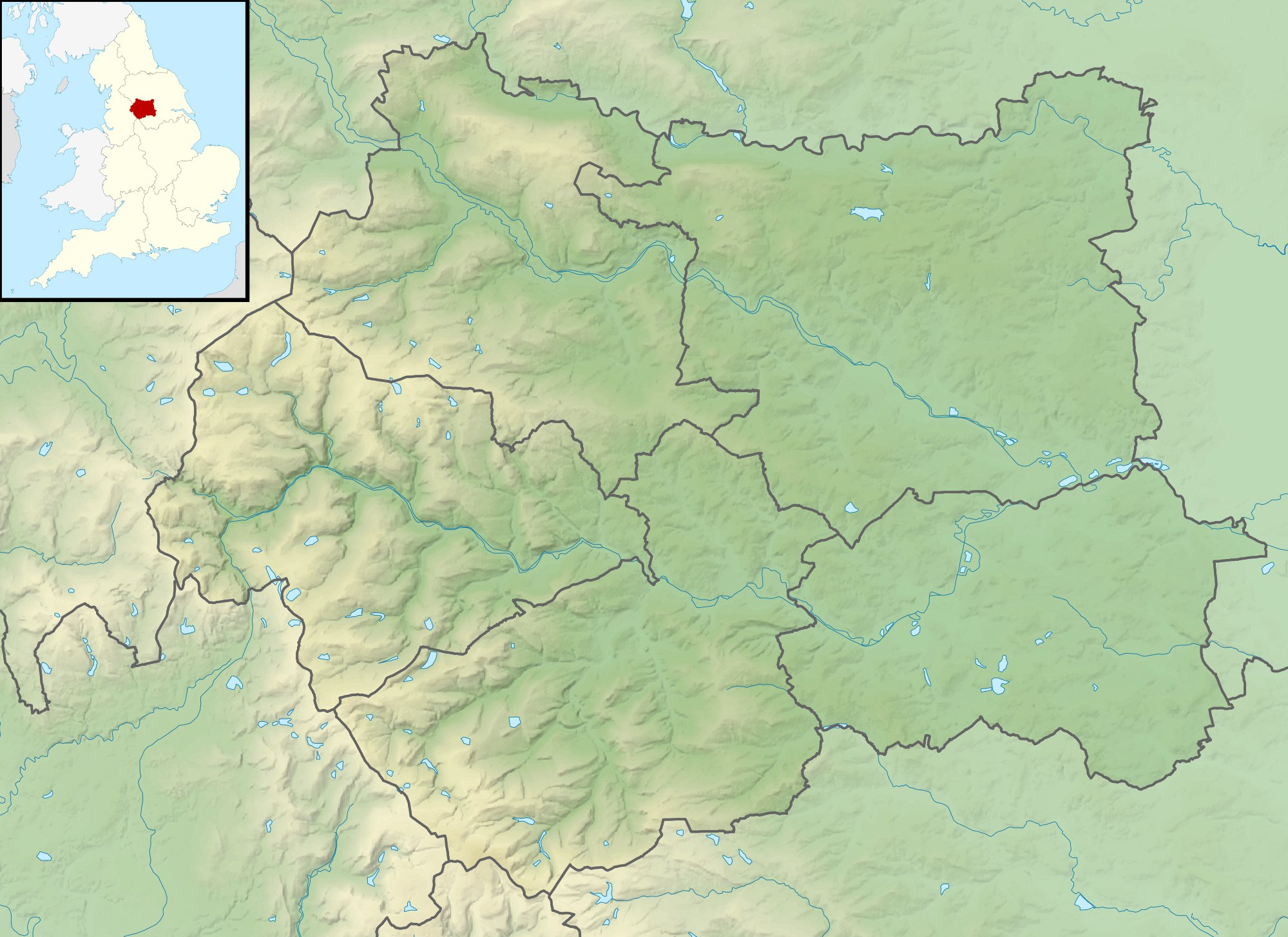
- Location within West Yorkshire
- Location: Rishworth, Ripponden, West Yorkshire
- Coordinates: 53°38′34.5″N 1°57′35.2″W
- Type: Reservoir
- Catchment area: 1,570 ha (3,900 acres)
- Basin countries: England
- Managing agency: Yorkshire Water
- Max. length: 0.93 miles (1.5 km)
- Surface area: 52 acres (20.9 ha)
- Average depth: 5 feet 3 inches (1.6 m)
- Max. depth: 152 feet (46 m)
- Shore length^{1}: 3.1 miles (5.0 km)
- ^{1} Shore length is not a well-defined measure.

Booth Wood Reservoir is a man-made upland reservoir that lies north of the M62 motorway and south of the A672 road near to Rishworth and Ripponden in Calderdale, West Yorkshire, England. The reservoir was approved for construction in 1966 and completed in 1971. It supplies water to Wakefield.

The reservoir dams the Booth Dean Clough watercourse and takes water directly from the surrounding moorland. It has a plain concrete crest on the dam head which is straight and extends to a length of 1,150 feet (350 m) and a height of 157 feet (48 m).

In 1995 a long dry spell in the summer created a larger than normal abstraction of water from Booth Wood creating the need to transport water into the reservoir as stocks ran very low. Road tankers carrying fresh water were despatched from Selby in North Yorkshire and Kielder Water in Northumberland to bring water for offloading at Booth Wood. At the height of the operation, 700 tankers delivered 70,000 tonnes (77,000 tons) of water a day to the reservoir which then fed other reservoirs in West Yorkshire.

On 14 August 2016, the A672 road which runs along the northern edge of the reservoir was closed whilst police searched for a driver and car that had plunged off the road and into the reservoir. The driver was believed to be the only person in the car and the search operation involved helicopters and underwater divers. The search resumed the next day when a man's body was recovered.
