= Digley Reservoir =

Reservoir in West Yorkshire, England

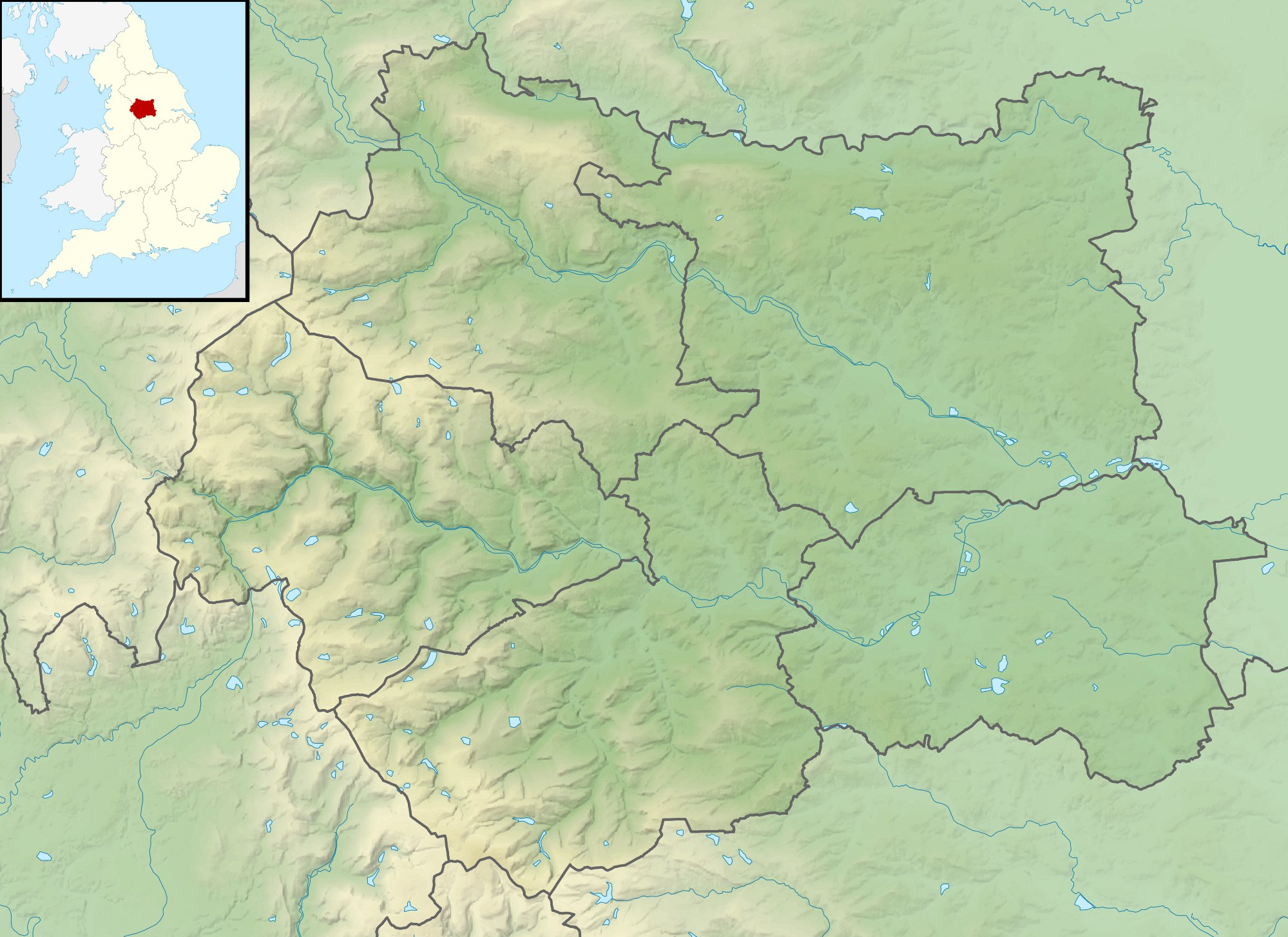
- Location within West Yorkshire
- Location: West Yorkshire, England
- Coordinates: 53°33′35″N 1°50′16″W
- Type: Reservoir
- Primary inflows: Marsden Clough
- Catchment area: 2,350 acres (953 ha)
- Basin countries: United Kingdom
- Surface area: 42 acres (17 ha)
- Average depth: 61 feet (18.6 m)
- Water volume: 660 million imperial gallons (3.0 Gl)
- Shore length^{1}: 0.81 miles (1.3 km)
- Surface elevation: 794 feet (242 m)
- ^{1} Shore length is not a well-defined measure.

Digley Reservoir is a reservoir located downstream of Bilberry Reservoir, 2 miles (3.2 km) south west of Holmfirth, in West Yorkshire, England. The reservoir was planned during the 1930s, with much land being bought for its construction, but it was not completed until 1954.

== History ==
A bill was presented before Parliament in October 1936 to enable the Huddersfield Corporation to build a reservoir at Digley, impounding Digley Brook. This was passed in July 1937 as the Huddersfield Corporation Act 1937 (1 Edw. 8 & 1 Geo. 6. c. lxix) and required the purchase of several buildings, including two mills and a pub (the Isle of Skye Inn), though one of the mills was derelict. The reservoir did not open until 1954.

== Recreation ==
The area is associated with the TV sitcom ‘Last of the Summer Wine’, which was filmed in Holmfirth and the surrounding areas. The reservoir has a picnic area, two free car parks and there are also some benches around the lake that provide a quiet place of reflection. There are two main walking routes, the long walking route is 5 miles (8 km) and goes as far as Blackpool Bridge in Holmfirth. The shorter route is an easy circular Peak District walk around the reservoirs, which starts at the car park at the North Eastern end of the reservoir, off Gibriding Lane. It leads around to the North End of the reservoir on Kirklees Way, passing by Bilberry reservoir through to Digley Wood on the southern side of the water, before returning to the car park using Fieldhead Lane. The reservoir is also one of the waypoints on the Yorkshire Water Way.

The reservoir is a source of water for Yorkshire and Yorkshire Water provide the free car parking plus walking route maps to follow. Their Digley, Bilberry and Beyond Walk is 5.5 miles (8.9 km) long and the Digley Walk is 1.5 miles (2.4 km). The Peak District Boundary Walk runs along the west side of the reservoir.
