= Percy Fry Kendall =

English geologist

Percy Fry Kendall, FRS (15 November 1856 – 19 March 1936), was an English geologist who was Professor of Geology at the University of Leeds from 1906 to 1922.

== Early life and education ==
Kendall was the youngest of the eight children of Charles Kendall, a commercial traveller, and his wife Hannah Eltringham. He was born on 15 November 1856 in Mile End, London.

He was educated at home and then studied Biology under Professor T H Huxley FRS and Geology under Professor J W Judd FRS at the Royal College of Science (now part of Imperial College London) in South Kensington, London.

== Academic career ==
In 1885 Kendall became Bishop Berkeley Fellow at Owens College, Manchester, by then part of the federal Victoria University. In 1887 he was appointed an Assistant Lecturer in Geology there. In 1889 Kendall moved to Stockport Technical School as a part-time Lecturer in Natural Sciences.

By 1891 Kendall was also lecturing part-time at the Yorkshire College in Leeds. The Yorkshire College became the University of Leeds in 1904. The university awarded him the degree of MSc in 1905 and in the following year appointed him Professor of Geology. Kendall retired from his chair as Emeritus Professor in 1922.

== Honours ==
In 1909 Kendall was awarded the Lyell Medal of the Geological Society of London, mainly for his work on the glacial geology of England.

Kendall was elected a Fellow of the Royal Society (FRS) in 1924. In 1926 he was awarded the honorary degree of DSc by the University of Leeds.

== Marriage and children ==
Kendall married Helen Mary Woodward of Wolverhampton in 1886. They had two sons.

== Death ==
Kendall died in Frinton-on-Sea, Essex on 19 March 1936 at the age of 79 and was buried in Ipswich. He was survived by his wife and sons.
