= Vale of Pickering =

Low-lying plain in North Yorkshire, England

Coordinates: 54°12′N 0°42′W

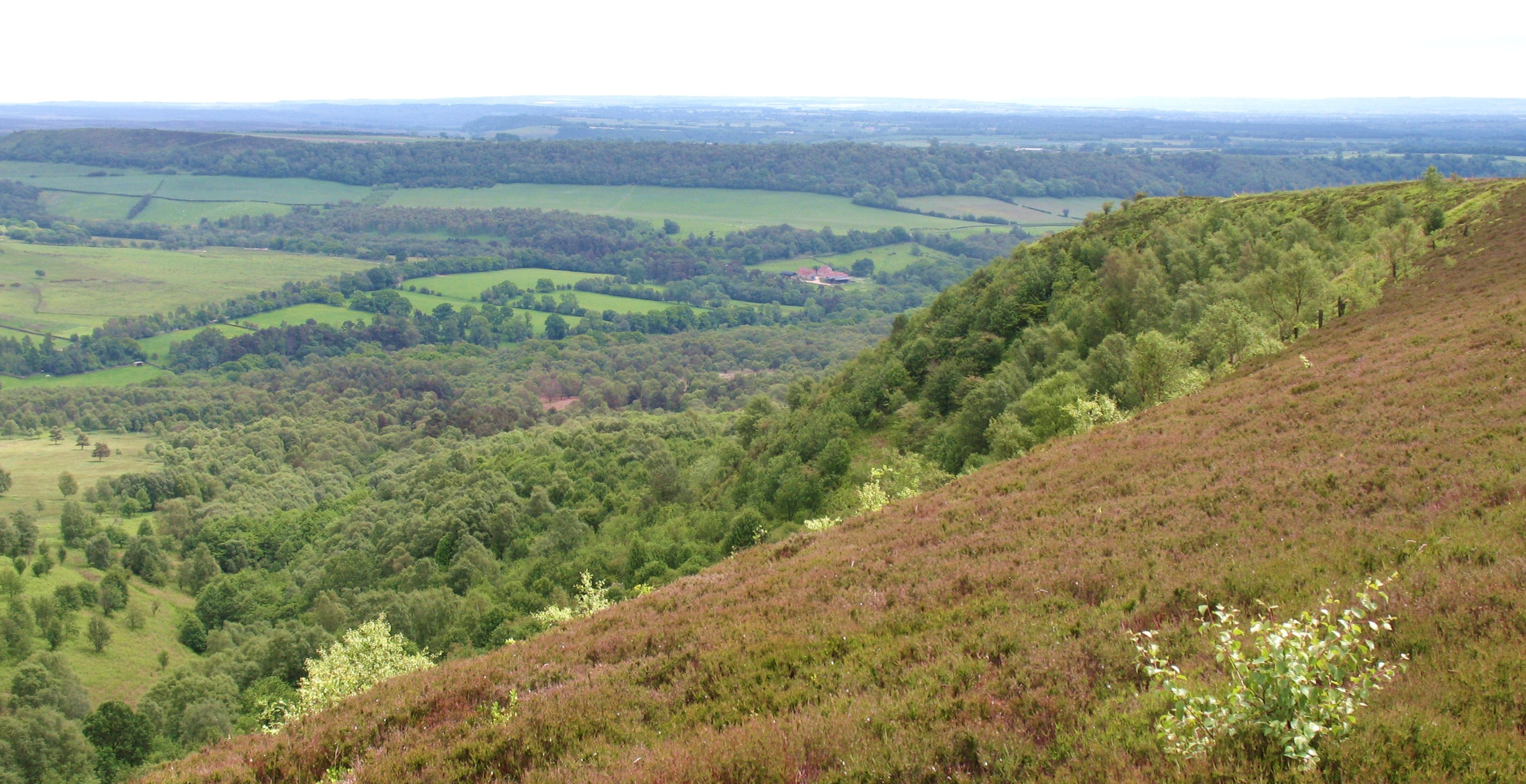
View of Sleightholme Dale from Potato Nab, north of Nawton.

The Vale of Pickering is a low-lying flat area of land in North Yorkshire, England. It is drained by the River Derwent. The landscape is rural with scattered villages and small market towns. It has been inhabited continuously from the Mesolithic period. The present economy is largely agricultural with light industry and tourism playing an increasing role.

It is defined by the Yorkshire Wolds escarpment to the south, the Corallian limestone foothills of the North York Moors to the north, the North Sea coast to the east and the Howardian Hills to the west.

== Physical geography ==
=== Climate ===
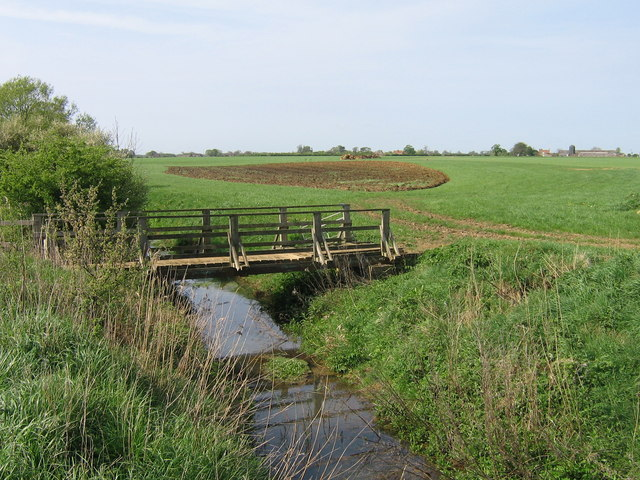
Footbridge over Welldale Beck, a stream issuing as a spring at the base of the North York Moors.

As part of the United Kingdom, the Vale of Pickering generally has cool summers and relatively mild winters. Weather conditions vary from day to day as well as from season to season. The latitude of the area means that it is influenced by predominantly westerly winds with depressions and their associated fronts, bringing with them unsettled and windy weather, particularly in winter. Between depressions there are often small mobile anticyclones that bring periods of fair weather. In winter anticyclones bring cold dry weather. In summer the anticyclones tend to bring dry, settled conditions which can lead to drought. For its latitude this area is mild in winter and cooler in summer due to the influence of the Gulf Stream in the northern Atlantic Ocean.

Air temperature varies on a daily and seasonal basis. The temperature is usually lower at night and January is the coldest time of the year with an average maximum of 5.8 °C (42.4 °F). July is usually the warmest month with an average maximum of 19.4 °C (66.9 °F). Average annual rainfall is 755 mm (29.7 in) with rain falling on 129 days.

=== Geology ===
The site of the post-glacial Lake Pickering, the vale has a predominantly level topography covered by glacial drift deposits, with some rolling low ground on boulder clay and moraines in the far east. The underlying Jurassic sandstones and mudstones have little direct influence upon the landscape. There are minor outliers of Jurassic limestone in places at the foot of the Howardian Hills and the North York Moors, and there is some eroded chalk from the Wolds mixed with sands at the base of the Wolds in the southeast. There are springs associated with calcareous aquifers in places on the periphery of the vale.

=== Drainage ===
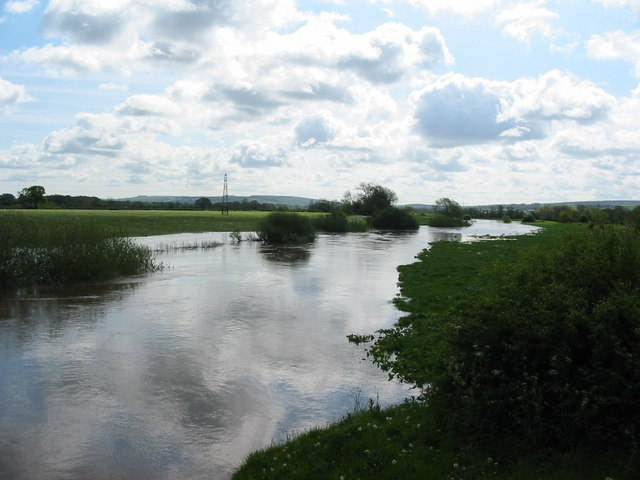
The River Rye in flood looking from the A169 road at Howe Bridge.

The Vale of Pickering is a drainage basin for the surrounding hills. At the eastern end of the area the canalised and straightened River Hertford drains west into the River Derwent, which rises on the North York Moors a few miles from Scarborough before draining southwards into the vale. At the western part of the area the River Rye and its numerous tributaries flow eastwards and join the Derwent to the north of Malton. The Derwent then flows southwards through Malton and the Kirkham gorge to eventually join the River Ouse at Barmby on the Marsh. Many of the watercourses in the Vale are maintained by the Vale of Pickering Internal Drainage Board.

== Natural history ==
Following the last glaciation Lake Pickering gradually drained away leaving a complex of rivers and marshes. The carrs, marshes, ings and wet meadows have now all been drained by humans and, as well as the rivers, the landscape is crossed by a network of canalised drainage ditches and canals which regulate the water table. In spite of this legacy of river engineering and land drainage, the rivers of the Vale of Pickering remain one of the most important wildlife features of the area. There are many species of aquatic birds, plants, insects and mammals inhabiting the riparian areas, and fish such as greyling and brown trout thrive in the rivers of the western area.

The deep-sided drains that are managed by frequent dredging and contaminated by agricultural runoff are poor habitats for wildlife. Drainage has created reasonably fertile soils, which are used for arable cultivation and for pasture. There are flat open pastures, areas of intensive arable production and more varied undulating, enclosed landscapes, which creates diversity within the vale as a whole. Woodland is sparse but there is more in the east towards West Ayton and Wykeham.

The coastal belt has a rather different landscape. The land to the east was not part of glacial Lake Pickering, and glacial deposits have created a more hilly undulating landscape. In all areas, agricultural development has resulted in a loss of natural habitats except for small relics of former areas which are now being monitored and conserved.

== History and settlement ==
The earliest known evidence of human presence in the area dates back to the Mesolithic period. The most important remaining settlement of this period is that at Star Carr, where archaeologists have found evidence of a permanent house 10,500 years ago on the shore of what was then a shallow lake, as well as "a wooden platform extending 18–20 feet [5–6 m] over the surface of the lake itself" near Scarborough where, due to waterlogged conditions, a considerable quantity of organic remains as well as flint tools have survived. This is Britain’s best-known Mesolithic site. The site, on the eastern shores of glacial Lake Pickering, was surrounded by birch trees, some of which had been cleared and used to construct a rough platform of branches and brushwood. Lumps of turf and stones had been thrown on top of this construction to make a village site. The site was probably visited from time to time by about four or five families who were engaged in hunting, fishing and gathering wild plants as well as manufacturing tools and weapons and working animal skins for clothes.

On the southern edge of the vale lies West Heslerton, where recent excavation has revealed continuous habitation since the Late Mesolithic, about 5000 BC. This site has revealed a great deal of dwelling and occupation evidence from the Neolithic period to the present day.

The development of farming during the succeeding Neolithic period is evident in the distribution of earth long barrows throughout the area. Bronze and Iron Age remains have been found on the fringe of the vale. There are sections of Roman roads and Roman villas, which indicate economic activity in the vale at the time.

In 2011 excavations close to the present village of Sherburn on the southeastern edge of the vale uncovered the remains of a large Anglo-Saxon settlement.

The vale is rich in the remains of the English medieval period, between the 11th and 15th centuries. There are castles, such as those at Helmsley and Pickering, as well as fortified manor houses and churches of the period. There is also a notable example of medieval strip fields at Middleton.

In the 17th and 18th centuries, wealthy landowners created fine buildings and estates such as those at Wykeham Abbey, Nunnington Hall and Ebberston Hall.

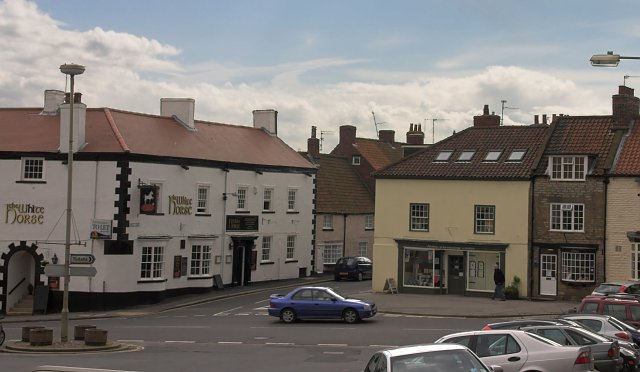
The centre of the market town of Kirkbymoorside.

The settlement pattern of the Vale of Pickering is striking. There are two types of settlement, both relating to the topography. The first group is the villages and towns on the northern and southern fringes of the area. These settlements were established in close proximity to each other on the approximate shoreline of the glacial lake. They were built along the spring line, where the underlying aquifers met less porous rocks. Many of the parishes associated with the settlements are linear, running from the vale bottom upwards to the higher ground, meaning that the long narrow parishes each had an amount of different types of soil and elevation.

The second type of settlement is on the valley floor. These are small more widely-spaced villages in areas of rising ground. These villages result from the relatively late enclosure of the carr lands following their drainage at the beginning of the 19th century. Long narrow lanes and tracks with wide grass verges link these settlements and solid well-managed hedges.

Building materials vary from soft limestones and sandstones to harder gritstones. The steep slopes of the roofs suggests that the older buildings had thatch coverings but these have been mostly replaced by red pantiles.

== Economy ==
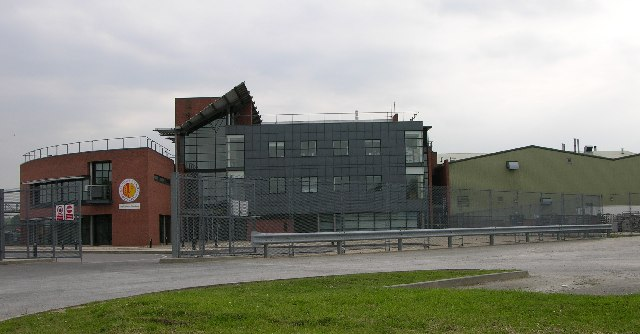
The Malton Bacon Factory is the town's largest employer.

The market towns of Helmsley, Kirkbymoorside, Pickering and Malton are the largest centres of population in the Ryedale District with about half of the population living there. The eastern part of the area is dominated by the influence of Scarborough.

Each of the market towns within the former district of Ryedale has areas set aside for industrial use and small firms engaged in light industry and the service industries occupy these. The largest employer in the district is the Malton Bacon Factory, employing more than 2,000 people. Other businesses generally employ less than 25 people.

In the Borough of Scarborough's area of the Vale of Pickering, a small industrial estate is located at Hunmanby. The main source of employment in the vale is agriculture with tourism and retailing in the market towns and near to the coast.

== Transport ==
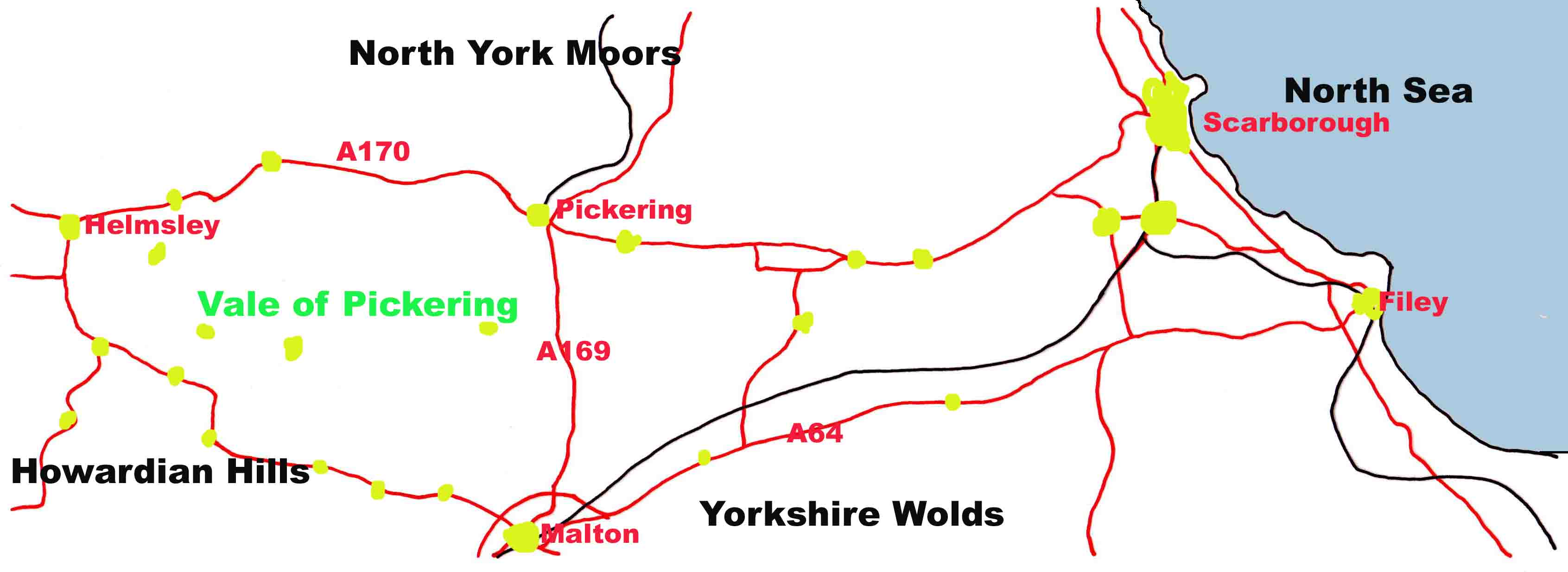
The location and roads of the Vale of Pickering

The east–west-orientated main roads (A64 and A170) in the vale follow the shoreline of the glacial lake, which formed in the vale after the last ice age. The main A169 road crosses the vale in a north–south direction, joining the market towns of Malton and Pickering. At the eastern edge of the vale the A165 carries traffic along a north–south coastal route through Scarborough. The York to Scarborough rail line crosses the eastern part of the vale linking York and Malton to Scarborough, and the coastal rail line links Scarborough to Filey, Bridlington and Hull. There is a heritage railway from Pickering to Grosmont with connections to Whitby, which operates steam and old diesel engines in the tourist seasons.

Administratively, the Vale of Pickering lies wholly in the North Yorkshire unitary authority area.

== Places of interest ==
- Ruins of Helmsley Castle begun after 1120 by Walter Espec, who also founded Rievaulx Abbey and Kirkham Priory.
- Nunnington Hall, 17th century manor house with a sheltered walled garden on the banks of the River Rye.
- Pickering Castle, a classic and well-preserved example of an early castle.
- Filey
- Flamingoland
- Malton, the largest of the market towns in the vale, with Roman beginnings and good exhibitions of local archaeology in the museum.

== See also ==
- Pickering Lythe
