= Kelda Group =

Parent company of Yorkshire Water

Kelda Group Limited
- Formerly: Yorkshire Water plc (1989–1999); Kelda Group plc (1999–2008)
- Company type: Private
- Industry: Utility
- Founded: April 1, 1989; 37 years ago
- Headquarters: Bradford, England, UK
- Key people: Vanda Murray (Chair); Nicola Shaw (CEO)
- Revenue: £878.9 million (2007)
- Operating income: £338.2 million (2007)
- Net income: £151.3 million (2007)
- Owner: Saltaire Water
- Number of employees: 3,843 (2007)
- Subsidiaries: Yorkshire Water; Kelda Water Services
- Website: keldagroup.com

Kelda Group Limited is a British utility company. It is based in Bradford, England. It was formerly listed on the London Stock Exchange and a constituent of the FTSE 100 Index, but was taken private by a group of investors, Saltaire Water, in 2008. Saltaire Water members include CitiBank and HSBC Holdings.

== History ==
Kelda Group, originally known as Yorkshire Water plc, was one of the regional water companies privatised in 1989. It changed to its current name in 1999. In 2000 Kelda purchased the United States water supply business Aquarion and subsequently announced the conditional sale of this asset in February 2006. It was taken private in a £3.04 billion deal in February 2008 by Saltaire Water, a consortium of investment companies including Citigroup and HSBC. Citi sold its infrastructure investments to Corsair Capital in 2015.

== Operations ==
Yorkshire Water remains its principal UK business. It provides water to 4.5 million people in northern England, mainly within the geographical county of Yorkshire. It has interests in non-regulated businesses related to its main activity, such as environmental management.
