= St John's Church, Newton-on-Rawcliffe =

Church in North Yorkshire, England

Coordinates: 54°18′08″N 0°45′06″W

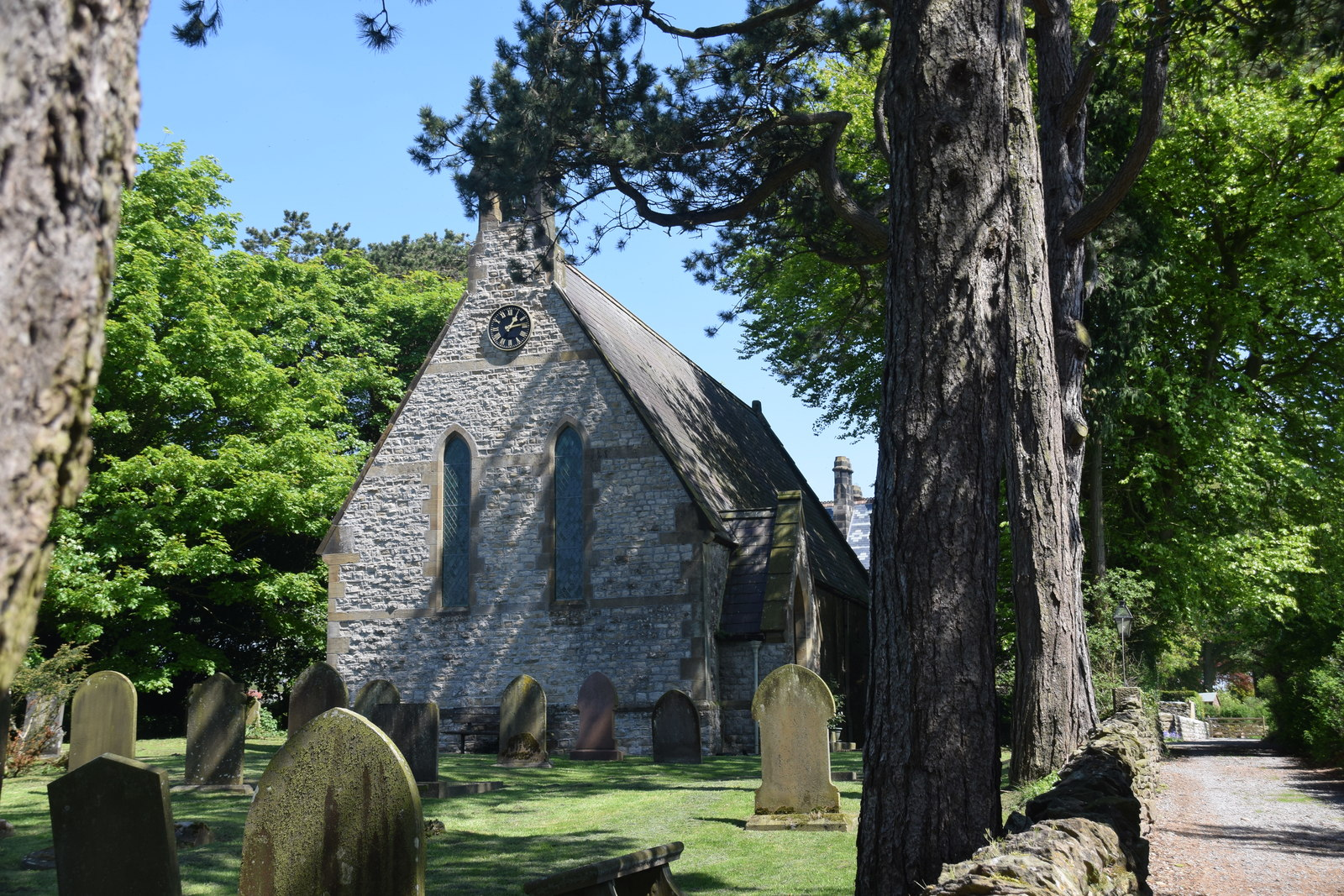
The church, in 2018

St John's Church is an Anglican church in Newton-on-Rawcliffe, a village in North Yorkshire, in England.

For many years, Newton-on-Rawcliffe lay in the parish of St Peter and St Paul's Church, Pickering. A small wooden chapel of ease was built in the village in 1689. By 1870, the building was in poor condition, so it was demolished and replaced by a new building in the Early English style.

The church consists of an undivided nave and chancel, a north vestry and a south porch. The building is six bays long, and at the west end there is a bellcote with two bells. The church has three lancet windows at the east end, and three at the west end. Inside are a chair and prayer stool made by Robert Thompson. The church clock, made by G. T. F. Newey in 1927, has a six-legged gravity escapement.
