= Newton-on-Rawcliffe =

Village and civil parish in North Yorkshire, England

Coordinates: 54°18′15″N 0°45′12″W

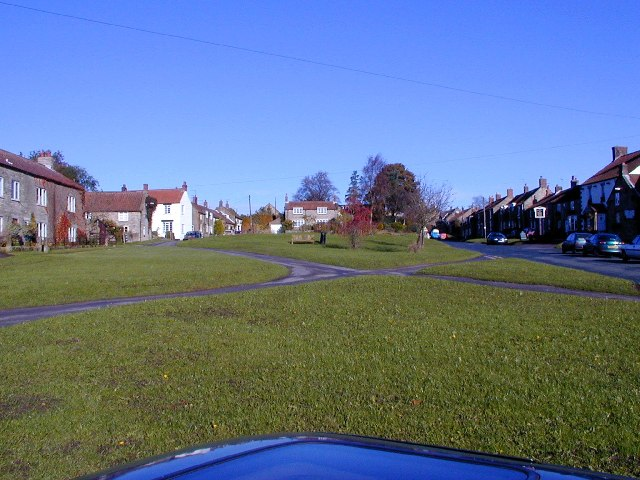
- Looking north into Newton-on-Rawcliffe

- Location within North Yorkshire
- OS grid reference: SE811904
- Civil parish: Newton
- Unitary authority: North Yorkshire
- Ceremonial county: North Yorkshire
- Region: Yorkshire and the Humber
- Country: England
- Sovereign state: United Kingdom
- Post town: PICKERING
- Postcode district: YO18
- Police: North Yorkshire
- Fire: North Yorkshire
- Ambulance: Yorkshire
- UK Parliament: Thirsk and Malton

Newton-on-Rawcliffe is a village and civil parish (as Newton) in North Yorkshire, England. It is in the North York Moors National Park, 4 miles (6.4 km) north of Pickering. It was part of the Ryedale district between 1974 and 2023. It is now administered by North Yorkshire Council.

== History ==
The settlement is listed in the Domesday Book, and the name means new farm. The village has a small pond in the village green, and houses on either side of the main road through the village alongside the green.

Before the 1066 Conquest the important 'manor' of Pickering was held by Earl Morcar of Northumbria from 1065 to 1066. It had berewicks in Barton, Newton, Blandsby and Easthorpe, and soke in various places in the parishes of Pickering, Brompton, Ebberston, Allerston, Thornton Dale, Ellerburn, Levisham, Middleton and Barton. The whole was assessed at 50 carucates (a unit of land that could be ploughed by an eight-ox plough-team in a year).

In 1086 NEWTON (Newton upon Roucliff) was a berewick of Pickering, and by 1316 belonged to the Earl of Lancaster, to be later held by the Crown in right of the duchy of Lancaster.

At the time of Edward I King of England (1272 - 1307), it had an estimated value of £88.

== Features ==
The stone wheel village sign reads “Newton Upon Rawcliffe” facing Pickering on Yatts Road. The village is still locally known as "upon".

The Playing Field opposite the sign was born when two young lads at the Parish Meeting in 1998, called to consider possible millennium projects, requested a field to play in. The one acre site was purchased in early in 2001 and was opened on the Queen's Jubilee day in 2002. It contains a children's play park: all year tennis, netball, basketball on the multi-sport hard court, and permanent barbecue beside the picnic tables by the football pitch.

In 1870 the current St John's Church, Newton-on-Rawcliffe was consecrated and is part of nine Church of England churches within the Kirby Misperton & Middleton parishes. Originally St John's church in Newton Upon Rawcliffe was part of the ancient Pickering Parish and during one period it had three places of worship. As buildings fell into disrepair and subsequently condemned, in 1866 work started to replace a wooden building of 1689, and four years later, in 1870 the current St John's Church was consecrated. Described as “a small building in the Early English style consisting of a nave and chancel without division, a north vestry and a south porch. It is six bays long in all and has three lancets in the east end and two at the west, with a bellcote containing one bell. The high-pitched roof is open to the ridge”. Little has altered over 150 years, and it still remains a typical mid-Victorian simple country church with services on the first Sunday of the month, plus Easter and Christmas.

St John's church hosts the chiming village clock announcing the hour and half-hour and was donated in 1927 in memory of Edward Bell Raper, who is buried alongside his wife Hilda Dilawur in the churchyard next to the field hedge. Edward Bell Raper was head boy at Shrewsbury School in 1880, and graduated from Pembroke College, Oxford in 1884, and in 1887 he had a business in Ousegate, York. The clock is fitted with a six-legged gravity escapement, the mechanism goes all the way up the tower and uses the church bell to strike. A millennium bench sits directly under the bell tower.

Seven Penny Garth allotments are situated just north of the church and vicarage on the east side of the village and within the National Park. Averaging approximately 14 by 35 metres for the use of the parishioners of Newton Upon Rawcliffe, the soil is sandy loam which is ideal for vegetable growing.

Opposite St John's Church of England site is the former Newton Methodist Chapel, closed around 2020, and is now a holiday home. Primitive Methodist magazine August 1853 pp. 496–497 states a new Methodist chapel was opened May 1853. Land was given by J Young of Stape, J Watson of Pickering made the deeds, and T Michelson gave the timber for the roof and sleepers. If everything had been paid for the cost would have been £100; the actual cost was £40. The chapel measured 27′ x 20.5′ and accommodated 100 people. J Young and S Stephenson collected nearly half of the money. The Foundation Stone of the Methodist chapel states it was laid in 1907.

The Methodist society first met in a cart shed belonging to Isaac Harland of Hartoft (distantly related to Edward James Harland born 1831, Newborough) in a room that was ”very damp, badly lighted and the road to it was through a farm yard.” William Harland who became Methodist Superintendent of the Scarborough circuit preached his first sermon there. The former cart shed is now a private double fronted home close to the village hall, with steps up from the road leading to a double door.

The earliest school in the Chapelry of Newton, as it was known then, was founded by will of Richard Poad in 1727, endowed with 25 acres of land, producing about £34 a year, and regulated by a scheme established by an order of 10 December 1857 of the county court of Yorkshire, holden at New Malton. Richard Poad's will is held at the Borthwick Institute in York. In 1894 new buildings were built for the public elementary village school. The location would have been the existing, building to the North, and adjacent, to St John's Church, this eventually became the Village Reading Room, which was replaced by the school at the top of the village which is now the Village Hall. The Reading Room was eventually sold and the money invested and incorporated into a trust fund. The village school in opposite the upper duck pond closed in 1969, and it's now the village hall. There is no school in Newton Upon Rawcliffe. but The Poads Educational Charity trust continues today, and provides small grants annually for young people who reside within the Newton Upon Rawcliffe Parish Boundary under the age of twenty five years.

The White Swan pub, YO18 8QA was also known as The Mucky Duck, and marks the bus stop for the weekly 173 bus operated by Ryedale Community Transport, picking up Monday mid-morning, and returning Monday early afternoon, enabling villagers use of Pickering market.

The pub is directly opposite the upper village green duck pond. Another additional duck pond existed on the lower green until it was filled in during 1949.

There is another pond down the unsurfaced Keld Lane behind the houses. In April 2007, local villager Dennis explained to the local newspaper Gazette & Herald: The pond had become derelict and filled with rubbish over many years and effectively dried out over summer so we embarked on a project to restore it. "We cleared it out and dug it out and refilled it, and built a bird hide to look at local wildlife which includes birds, foxes and badgers. It is a useful habitat for local wildlife."

A recessed classic ER VII red post box numbered YO18 107D-CP50 is in operation six days a week in the old post office, next to The White Swan pub. Post is collected at the same time that the village post is delivered in the morning.

Newton upon Rawcliffe's village hall wall houses the heart defibrillator, and noticeboard.

An original fully working red telephone box stands close to the Village Hall on Yatts Road, YO18 8QA with a reliable landline of 01751 473 291

The village road rises to the north, and next to a stone stating Newton Upon Rawcliffe sits a wooden and stone bench elevated on the top of the hill, with space for the walking signposts directing to an unpaved road listed on Google maps as E Brown Road, leading down the back of the village.

A viewpoint is accessed over a stye fence, close to power cables sits the Evans cousin's memorial bench with clear views to the moorland opposite, Newtondale, and down to Levisham Station for the steam engine track on the North Yorkshire Moors Railway. The path leads to Levisham Station in the valley, the town of Pickering, or back to the village via paths from behind The White Swan or St John's Church.

Visible from the memorial bench is the ruined Skelton Tower offers an extraordinary view down into Newtondale and over the track of the North Yorkshire Moors Railway. Built around 1830 by Reverend Robert Skelton (1791-1877), rector of Levisham, it was thought to be used as overnight lodgings after a day's shooting on the grassy headland moors.

== Memorials ==
Within the village and St John’s Church, Newton Upon Rawcliffe, are memorials to:

—

Mounted on the church wall:

Mounted Wall Brass Plaque. Erected to the memory of the brave members of this Chapel who gave their lives in the Great War 1914 - 1918 Fallen: C.W. Estill, D.R. Waind, J.W. Pearson. Served: C.E. Leng, B. Smith, W.P. Smith, C.V. Greenheld, H. Holtby, G.H. Atkinson, F. Russell.

Wall Brass Plaque: Remember before God these men who served in the Great War (1914 - 1918), And gave their lives for liberty and right. Bombardier George William Estill, Private Thomas William Mortimer, Private John William Pearson, Private Robert Pickering, Private William Jackson Potter, Private John Thomas Smith, Gunner John Tolley, Private David Randolph Waind. “Their name liveth for evermore”, Erected by the parishioners of Newton.

Roll of Honour, Newton-Upon-Rawcliffe, Names of the men from Newton Parish who served with the Colours in the Great War, 1914 - 1919. Written out by Robert L. Hart, York, January 1920.

Charles Allanson, Moses Allanson, John Botham, Tom Botham, John Brough, Albert Brown, Fred Brown, Bertie Eddon, Harold Eddon, Thomas Eddon, George William Estill, Harold Forth, Percy Forth, Charles Victor Greenfield, John Hill, Donald Holliday, Harry Holtby, [Newton] Harry Holtby, [Stape), Harry King, Charles Edward Leng, Arthur James Masterman, Reginald Masterman, Edward Milestone, Fred Milestone, Robert Milestone, Thomas William Mortimer, Bert Nichols, George William Nicols, Harold Nichols, George Robert Pearson, John William Pearson, John Francis Pennock, Robert Pickering, Thomas Pickering, William Jackson Potter, Fred Russell, Albert Sellars, Bertie Smith, John Thomas Smith, John William Smith, Percy Smith, William Smith, John Tolley, David Randolph Waind, Edmund Ward, John Watson, William Watson, Matthew William Woodmancey.

Brass Wall Plaque: To the memory of Edward Bell Raper 1864 - 1925 of [unclear] B…ck… Yorks. Formerly resident in Newtondale for eighteen years. Also Hilda Dilawur His wife 1878 - 1942. Here she first days here spent.

Brass by the recessed stone credence near the Holy Communion table: To the Glory of God and in pious memory of Sarah Ann Jackson. The floor of this Chancel was relaid, Credence built in and Altar presented by her husband the Reverend Frederick Jackson Vicar of this Paris All Saints Day 1895 RIP. (Frederick Jackson, priest of 20 years of the parish, born 27 October 1839 - died 31 December 1906, is buried in front of St John’s church east window, marked by a red granite cross. His wife, Sarah Ann Jackson, died 9th November 1893 aged 58 years is buried next to Frederick Jackson marked by a stone cross.)

Brass on communion rail: In memory of Bernard George Stenson Webb, Buried here February 1938

Brass on chancel chair: GW Presented by The Reverend E.C.Tippetts Vicar, On the silver jubilee of the Patron H.M.King George V “By me kings reign” - Proverbs 8.16

Stone bench next to Tabular Hills Walk signpost marks the Silver Jubilee of Queen Elizabeth II ER 1952 - 1977

The carved wooden Evans cousin's memorial bench rests upon an enclosed stone plinth, with a panoramic view of Newton Dale and remembers the cousins “Kenneth George Evans and Patrick Bryant Evans” . Weathered engraving on the bench reads: "In Memory of Kenneth George Evans and Patrick Bryant Evans. Cousins who for many years as boys together enjoyed the freedom of these moors. Both were killed in action whilst serving with The Royal Armoured Corps. The former on or about 15th June 1942 at some place unknown in the Western Desert Egypt. The latter on 21st November 1944 at Geilenkirchen, Germany. Both were aged 21 years.”

Wooden bench on the lower green: In loving memory of Leonard & Cynthia Allanson.

Tree on the lower green: In memory of Billy Garrett.

== See also ==
- Listed buildings in Newton-on-Rawcliffe
