= Pickering United Reformed Church =

Church building in Pickering, North Yorkshire, England

Coordinates: 54°14′42″N 0°46′41″W

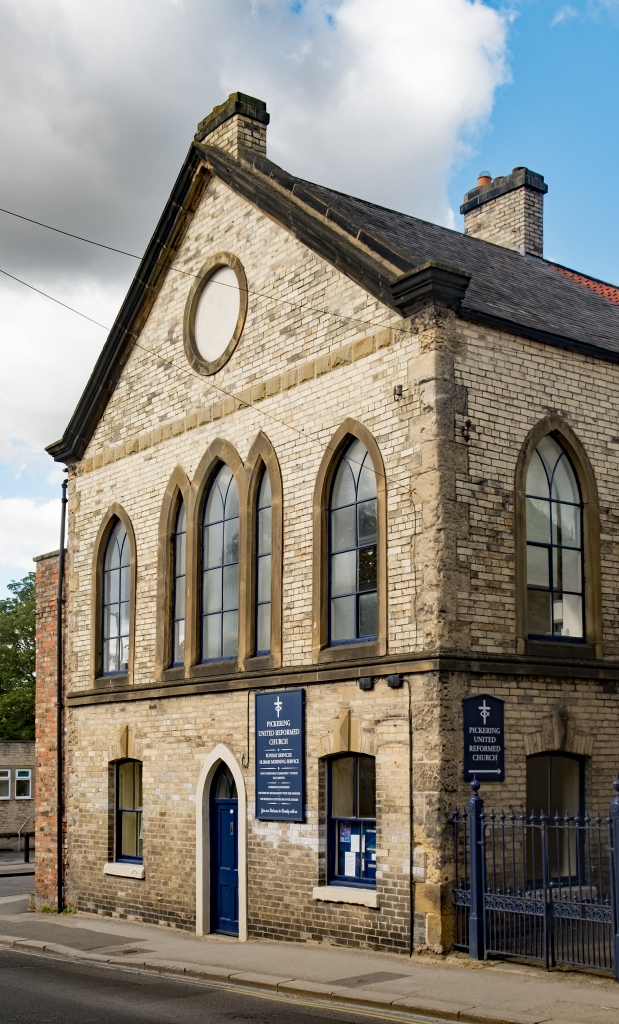
The church, in 2019

Pickering United Reformed Church is a historic former church in Pickering, North Yorkshire, a town in England.

In 1788, a group of worshippers left the Anglican St Peter and St Paul's Church, Pickering to establish an independent congregation. In 1793, they built a church on Hungate, which was enlarged in 1814 and refronted in 1867. The church affiliated to the Congregational Union of England and Wales, which later became part of the United Reformed Church. From 2019, the church was shared with the local Methodist congregation, while their building was being refurbished. The refurbishment was completed in 2021, and unable to afford repairs to their own building, the congregation decided to close the United Reformed Church. The building has been grade II listed since 1974.

The front is built of white brick with stone dressings, rusticated quoins, a moulded sill band, a cornice, and a gable containing a circular window. In the centre is an arched doorway flanked by segmental-headed windows with keystones. The upper floor contains a central triple lancet window, flanked by single-light lancets. The rear is in red brick and stone, and contains a porch with columns, and arched windows with Gothic glazing.

== See also ==
- Listed buildings in Pickering, North Yorkshire
