= Listed buildings in Newton-on-Rawcliffe =

Newton-on-Rawcliffe is a civil parish in the county of North Yorkshire, England. It contains nine listed buildings that are recorded in the National Heritage List for England. All the listed buildings are designated at Grade II, the lowest of the three grades, which is applied to "buildings of national importance and special interest". The parish contains the village of Newton-on-Rawcliffe and the surrounding countryside. The listed buildings consist of houses, cottages, farmhouses, a barn and a public house.

== Buildings ==
Name and location	Photograph	Date	Notes
Low Croft; 54.30522°N 0.75334°W	—	Early 18th century	A farmhouse, later a house, in sandstone, with a pantile roof, and a coped gable and kneeler on the left. There are two low storeys and two bays. The doorway is approached by steps, and has a divided fanlight. To its left is a sash window, and, apart from a fire window to the far right, the other windows are horizontally-sliding sashes.
Pond Farmhouse and barn 54.30410°N 0.75403°W	—	Early to mid 18th century	The farmhouse and barn are in limestone, with quoins and a pantile roof, the house with a coped gable. There are two storeys and the house has three bays. In the centre is a doorway with a pivoted window to the left, a French window to the right, and further to the right is a horizontally-sliding sash window. The upper floor contains casement windows. The barn to the left contains doors, one sliding, a fixed-light window and a pitching window.
Church Row; 54.30272°N 0.75289°W	—	Late 18th century	Three, later two, cottages in grey sandstone with a pantile roof, coped gables and shaped kneelers. There are two storeys and four bays. There are two doorways and one blocked doorway, and the windows are sashes. All the openings have painted chiselled lintels.
Keld Farmhouse and outbuildings 54.30339°N 0.75387°W	—	Late 18th century	The farmhouse with an attached cart shed and byre are in limestone, with repairs in brick, quoins, and a pantile roof with coped gables and shaped kneelers. The farmhouse has two storeys and four bays, to its right is a two-storey two-bay cart shed, and further to the right is a byre with one storey and a loft. The house has two doorways and horizontally-sliding sash windows, the cart shed has brick piers and painted lintels, and in the byre is a stable door and a pitching window.
Barn south of Keld Farmhouse; 54.30329°N 0.75368°W	—	Late 18th century	The barn with granary above is in limestone with quoins, a pantile roof, and two storeys. In the centre is a doorway, and elsewhere are slit vents and pitching doors.
House to north of Low Croft; 54.30531°N 0.75338°W	—	Late 18th century	The house is in limestone, and has a pantile roof with a coped gable on the left. There are two storeys and two bays, and a rear wing. The doorway has a divided fanlight, and the windows are sashes. All the openings have lintels with keystones.
Raper's Farmhouse; 54.33359°N 0.73459°W	—	Late 18th century	The farmhouse, later used for other purposes, in sandstone, with a stepped eaves course and a corrugated iron roof. There are two low storeys, a double depth plan and two bays. In the centre is a doorway and to its left is a horizontally-sliding sash window, both with tripartite keystones. To the right is a replacement window, and the upper floor contains horizontally-sliding sashes.
White Swan Hotel; 54.30407°N 0.75294°W		Late 18th to early 19th century	The public house is in stone on a plinth, with quoins and a pantile roof. There are two storeys, a double depth plan, and three bays. In the centre is a projecting gabled porch, and the windows on the front are sashes with wedge lintels. In the right gable wall is a round-headed window under a painted arch.
Spring Cottage; 54.30535°N 0.75340°W	—	Early 19th century	A pair of cottages in limestone with quoins and a pantile roof. There are two storeys, and each cottage has one bay, and a doorway with a fanlight on the left, and a sash window to the right in each floor.
