= St Joseph's Church, Pickering =

Church in Pickering, North Yorkshire, England

Coordinates: 54°14′48″N 0°46′55″W

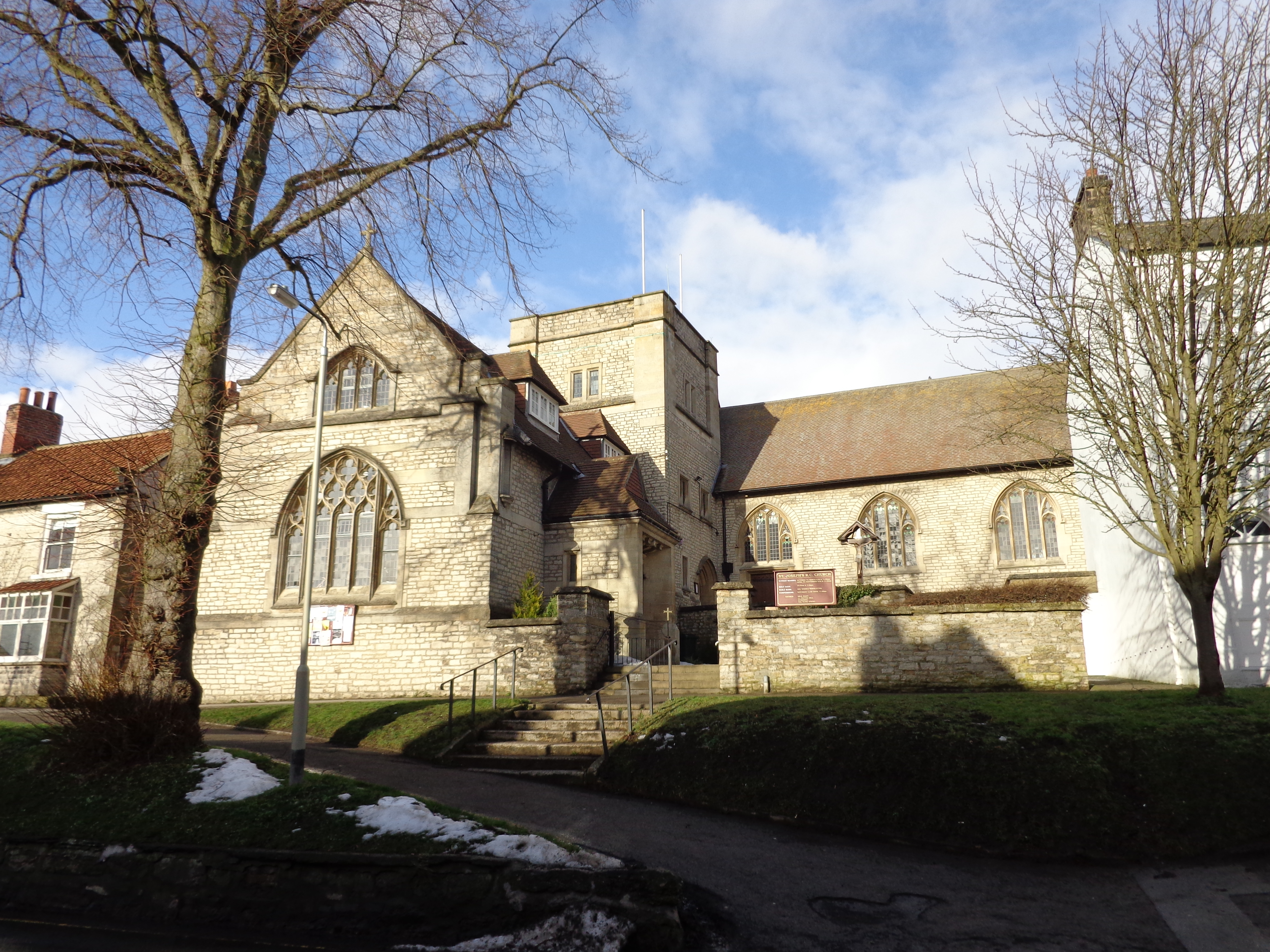
The church, in 2013

St Joseph's Church is a Catholic church in Pickering, North Yorkshire, a town in England.

Mass was said at Pickering in the 17th century by Nicholas Postgate, but services then lapsed and were only revived in 1896, when a priest from Malton began saying mass at the town's Salvation Army hall. In 1901, Father Edward Bryan moved to the town and purchased two cottages, using one as a chapel. He raised funds for a church, which was completed in 1911, to a design by Leonard Stokes. The church was grade II listed in 1975, along with the church hall

The church is built of stone with a tile roof, and consists of a nave, a north aisle, and a tower at the junction of the church and the hall. The hall is at a right angle and has a stone porch with a gambrel roof, a large Perpendicular-style window to the south, and hipped dormers on the roof. There is a statue of Saint Joseph on the south wall, believed to be by Peter Paul Pugin. Inside, there is an octagonal font carved by Eric Gill, and a stone altar with a cross also said to be by him. Other features include a carved holy water stoup and plain oak benches.

== See also ==
- Listed buildings in Pickering, North Yorkshire
