= Dorothy Cowlin =

British novelist, poet, newspaper columnist and article writer

- Cowlin from a 2000 newspaper article
- Born: Dorothy Cowlin; 16 August 1911; Grantham, Lincolnshire, England
- Died: 10 January 2010 (aged 98); Malton, North Yorkshire, England
- Resting place: The East Riding Crematorium
- Education: University of Manchester (B.A.)
- Occupations: Novelist, poet, columnist
- Spouse: Ronald Harry Whalley (m. 1941)
- Children: 1
- Writing career
- Years active: 1941–2009

Dorothy Cowlin (16 August 1911 – 10 January 2010) was a British novelist, poet, newspaper columnist and article writer with strong associations to North Yorkshire.

During her life she wrote eight novels which were all published by Jonathan Cape, four biographical novels aimed at younger readers, and four collections of poetry All her work was published under her maiden name rather than her married name, Dorothy Whalley.

== Biography ==
Dorothy Cowlin was born in Grantham, a market town in Lincolnshire, England in 1911. She studied Geography at the University of Manchester and was awarded a BA. She was a teacher in Stockport before marrying Ronald Whalley on 12 April 1941 at the parish church of Hampton Bishop whilst he was serving as a chiropodist in the RAF Hospital at Locking. At that time a married woman could not continue working, so she turned her attention to writing which she had always had an ambition to do. She had a daughter in 1942 whom she named Virginia after Virginia Woolf, an author whose work she greatly admired. Her first novel, "Penny To Spend", was published by Jonathan Cape in 1941 and was followed by seven others, but her style of writing fell out of favour, and she turned her attention to poetry.

The family first moved to Pickering, North Yorkshire in late Autumn 1948 when Ronald came to teach at a school in the neighbouring village of Thornton-le-Dale. Dorothy fell in love with the countryside of the nearby Dales, and her writing often used the local environment as a background She wrote columns for Malton newspaper the Gazette & Herald for more than 30 years, a long running series of articles for Scarborough's weekly paper The Mercury, and articles for magazines like The Dalesman, Yorkshire Life and Yorkshire Ridings, which often concerned local history and her own reminiscences. A collection of 25 articles that originally appeared in the Gazette & Herald was published in 2000 under the title Do You Remember? Pickering 50 years ago. Her poems appeared in The Dalesman and many other magazines.

Her poem The Sound of Rain has been featured by BBC Radio 4's programme Poetry Please, and her poem Pennine Tunnel was the winner of a competition run by Yorkshire Television's magazine programme Calendar and judged by David Morley

== Bibliography ==
=== Novels ===
- Penny to Spend (1941) Pub. Jonathan Cape
- Winter Solstice (first published 1942 by Jonathan Cape in the UK and 1943 by Macmillan in the US; republished 1991 by Merlin Press with an introduction by Gabriele Griffin (Note: The 1991 republication of Winter Solstice incorrectly states on the back cover that the author died in 1962.))
- The Holly and the Ivy (1950) Pub. Jonathan Cape
- The Slow Train Home (1951) Pub. Jonathan Cape
- Rowanberry Wine (1952) Pub. Jonathan Cape
- An End and a Beginning (1954) Pub. Jonathan Cape
- Draw the Well Dry (1955) Pub. Jonathan Cape
- The Pair of Them (1956) Pub. Jonathan Cape

=== Biographical novels ===
- Greenland Seas: The story of Scoresby the whaler (1965) Pub. E. J. Arnold & Son, with illustrations by Ray Bailey
- A woman in the desert: The story of Gertrude Bell (1967) Pub. Frederick Muller Limited of London, with illustrations by Penny Carey
- Elizabeth Barrett Browning (1968) Pub. Frederick Muller, with illustrations by Sheila Bewley
- Cleopatra: Queen of Egypt (1970) Pub. Wayland Publishers

=== Other works ===
- The Sound of Rain (1991)
- Winter Rooks (1998)
- Do you remember? Pickering 50 Years Ago (2000, Blackthorn Press)
- Pigeon Past (2002)
- The Sound of Rain and 99 other poems (2009, self-published)
