= Pickering, North Yorkshire =

Market town in North Yorkshire, England

Coordinates: 54°14′40″N 0°46′32″W

Pickering
- Town
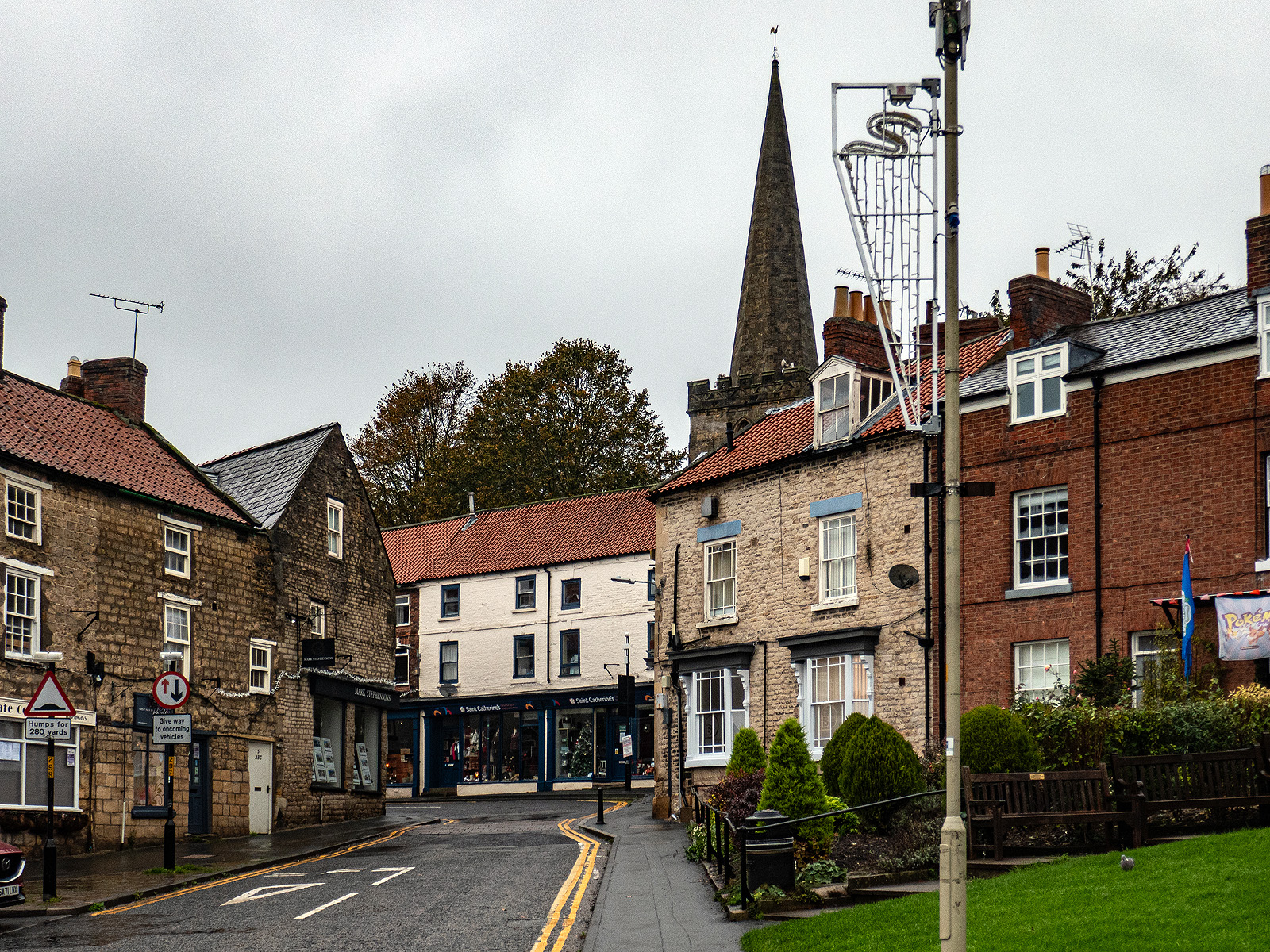
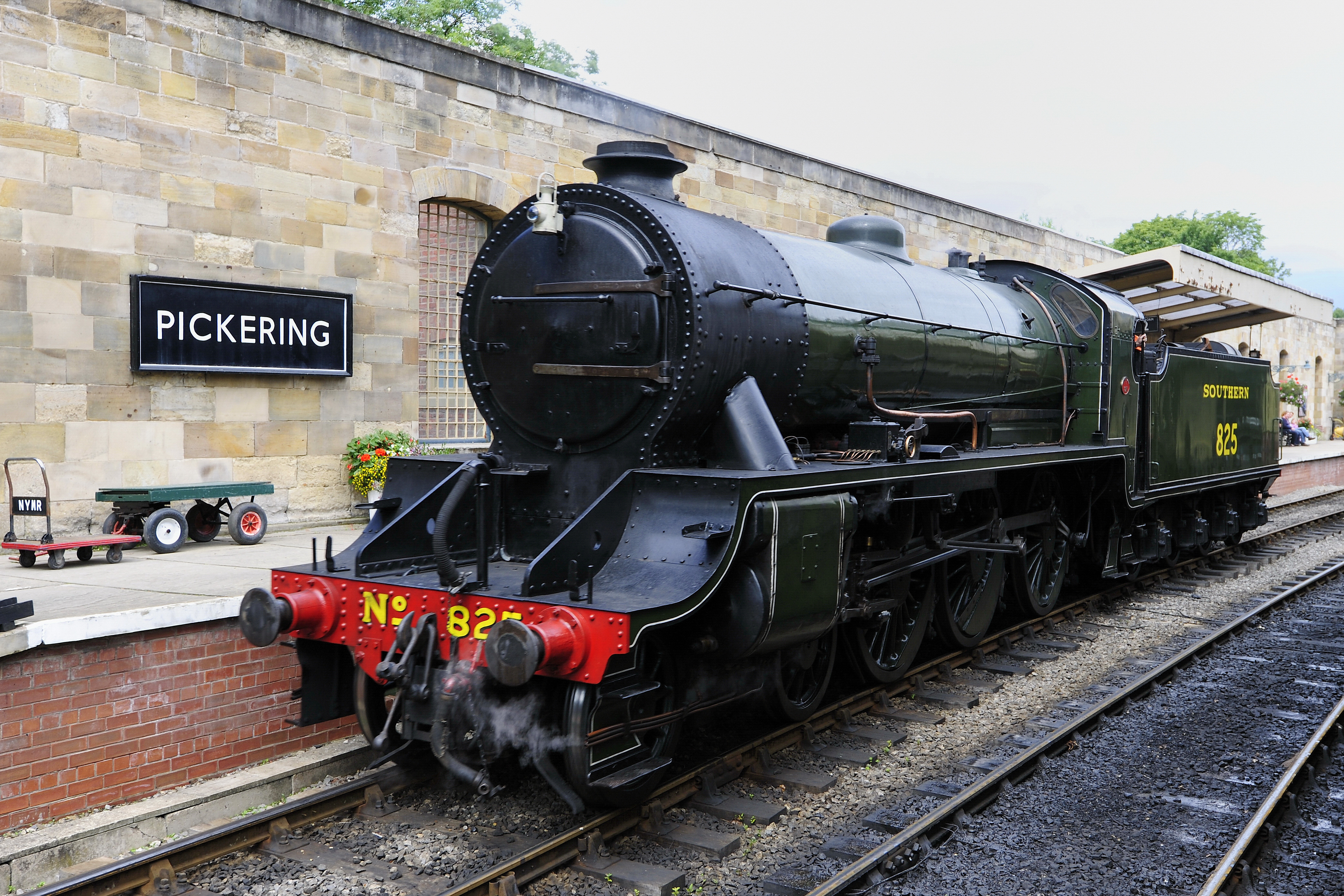
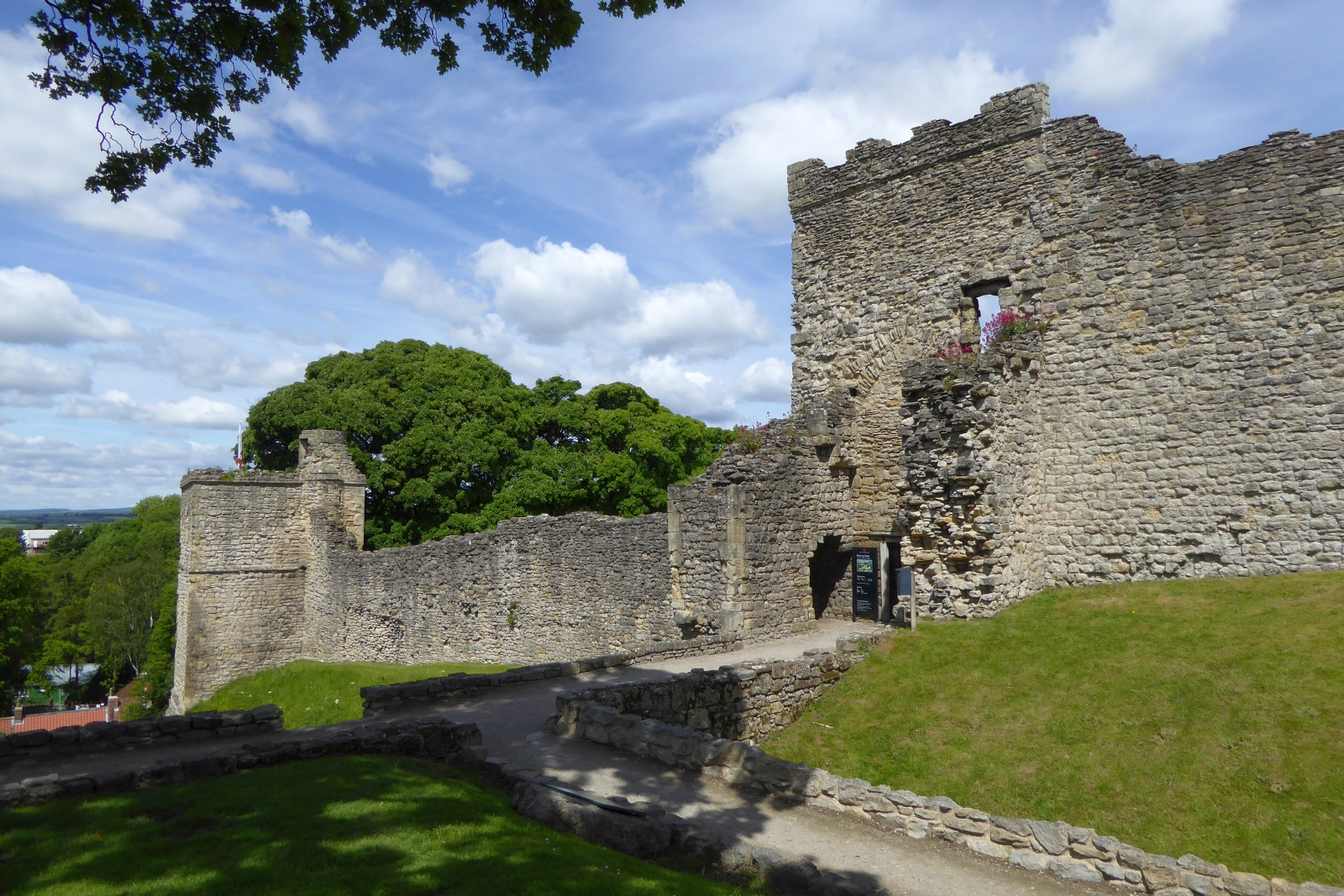
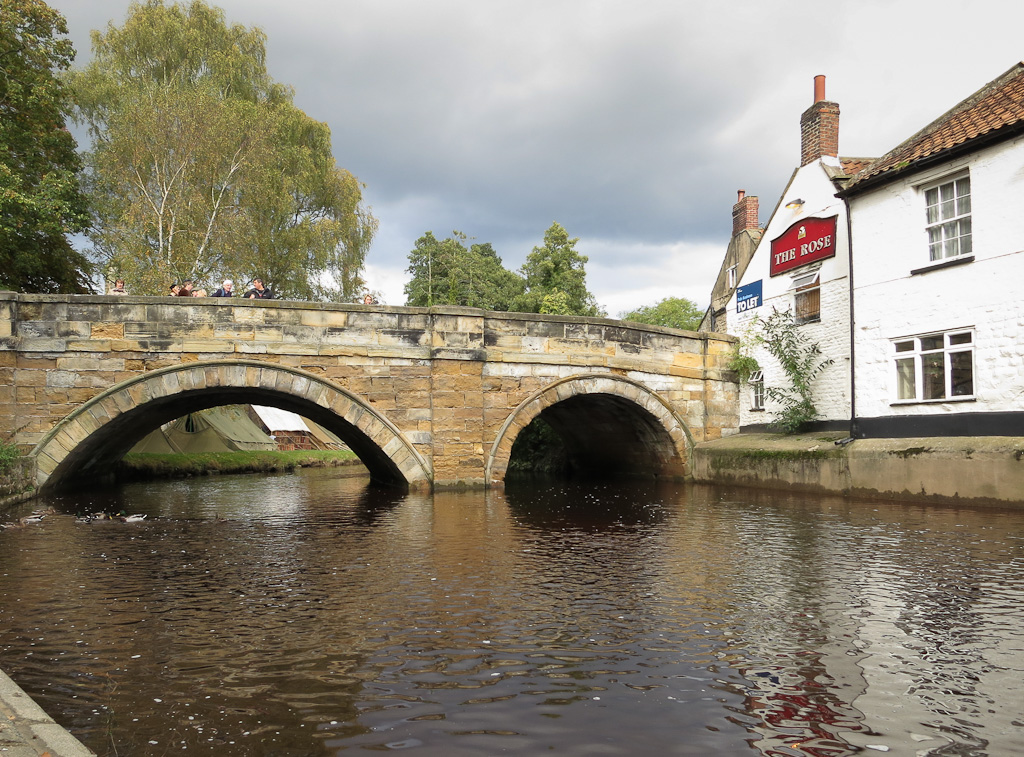
- Smiddy Hill North Yorkshire Moors Railway Pickering Castle St Peter & St Paul's Church Pickering Beck

- Location within North Yorkshire
- Population: 6,830 (2011 Census)
- OS grid reference: SE797838
  - London: 195 mi (314 km) S
- Unitary authority: North Yorkshire
- Ceremonial county: North Yorkshire
- Region: Yorkshire and the Humber
- Country: England
- Sovereign state: United Kingdom
- Post town: PICKERING
- Postcode district: YO18
- Dialling code: 01751
- Police: North Yorkshire
- Fire: North Yorkshire
- Ambulance: Yorkshire
- UK Parliament: Thirsk and Malton

Pickering is a market town and civil parish in North Yorkshire, England, on the border of the North York Moors National Park. Historically part of the North Riding of Yorkshire, it is at the foot of the moors, overlooking the Vale of Pickering to the south.

Pickering Parish Church, with its medieval wall paintings, Pickering Castle, the North Yorkshire Moors Railway and Beck Isle Museum have made Pickering popular with visitors. Nearby places include Malton, Norton-on-Derwent and Scarborough.

== History ==
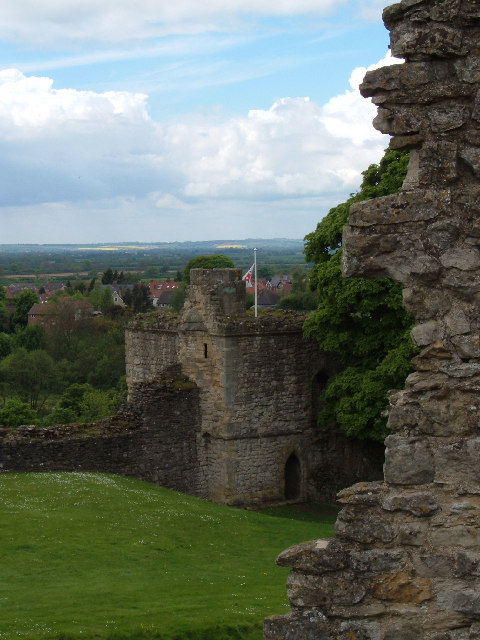
Pickering Castle

Positioned on the shores of a glacial lake at the end of the last ice age, Pickering was in an ideal place for early settlers to benefit from the multiple natural resources of the moorlands to the north, the wetlands to the south, running water in the beck and the forests all around. It had wood, stone, wildfowl, game, fish, fresh water and fertile easily worked soils. The east–west route from the coast passed along the foothills of the North York Moors through the site at a place where the beck could be forded. There is evidence of Celtic and Roman era habitation in the areas surrounding Pickering but little remains in the town. Legendary sources suggest an early date for the establishment of a town but traces of earlier settlements have been erased by subsequent development.

The name Pickering possibly derives from the Old English piceringas meaning 'the people of Picer'. The town probably existed throughout the Anglo-Saxon period of British history. According to the Domesday Book there was enough arable land for 47 ploughs, meadows and extensive woodlands.

=== After the conquest ===
Fresco of the martyrdom of Saint Catherine, one of The Pickering Wall Paintings

After 1066 when William I became the King, the town and its neighbourhood were in the possession of the crown. A castle and church were built at this time and the medieval kings occasionally visited the area. After the Harrying of the North by the Normans, the value of the village fell from £88 to £1. In 1267 the manor, castle and forest of Pickering were given by Henry III to his youngest son, Edmund, 1st Earl of Lancaster. The estate was confiscated by the King and then returned. Eventually, it passed to Henry, Duke of Lancaster who became King Henry IV of England. It has belonged to the monarch ever since.

In 1598 the streets of Pickering were: East Gate, Hall Garth, Hungate, Birdgate, Borrowgate (the present Burgate) and West Gate. Many older small houses were built at this time, some of stone with thatched roofs. The stocks, shambles and the market cross stood in the centre of town in the Market Place. The castle fell into disrepair yet the town flourished. In the English Civil War, Parliamentary soldiers were quartered in the town and damaged the church and castle and Pickering was the location of a minor skirmish but not a pitched battle.

In the 1650s George Fox, the founder of Society of Friends, or Quakers, visited the town to preach on at least two occasions. Nicholas Postgate, the Catholic martyr, lived for a time in Pickering. He was hanged, drawn and quartered in York in 1679.

=== 18th century ===
Pickering prospered as a market town and agricultural centre. It had watermills and several inns and was a centre for mail coach traffic and trade. At this time the beck was an open sewer and it remained so until the early part of the 20th century.

Many townspeople adoptioned Non-conformist religious sects and were visited by John Wesley on several occasions, the first in 1764 and the last in 1790. The Quakers held meetings in a cottage long before they built Pickering Quaker Meeting House in Castlegate in 1793. In 1789 the first Congregational Church was built in Hungate and for several years following 1793 a private residence was licensed for divine worship by protestant dissenters.

=== 19th century ===
Non-conformism flourished in Pickering during the 19th century and meeting houses and chapels were enlarged. The Pickering Methodist Circuit was formed in 1812, and the current Pickering Methodist Church was built in 1885. There were both Wesleyan and Anglican schools in the town from the middle of the century.

The Whitby and Pickering Railway was opened in 1836, entering Pickering station from the north. At first the trains were horse drawn, with a stagecoach connection from Pickering to York. In 1845 the York and North Midland Railway built its line from York to Scarborough, with a branch from Rillington Junction to Pickering, and acquired the Whitby line, which was rebuilt for use by steam locomotives. In 1875, the Gilling and Pickering line opened, connecting Pickering to Kirkbymoorside, Helmsley and Thirsk. In 1882, the Forge Valley line opened, connecting Pickering to Scarborough via Thornton-le-Dale. The lines from Rillington, Kirkbymoorside and Thornton-le-Dale all entered Pickering from the south, joining together at Mill Lane Junction.

The local Health Board (the forerunner of the Urban District Council) was formed in 1863. A Gas and Water Company provided gaslight and piped drinking water. The shop fronts were closed in and glass windows were used to display goods for sale.

=== 20th century ===
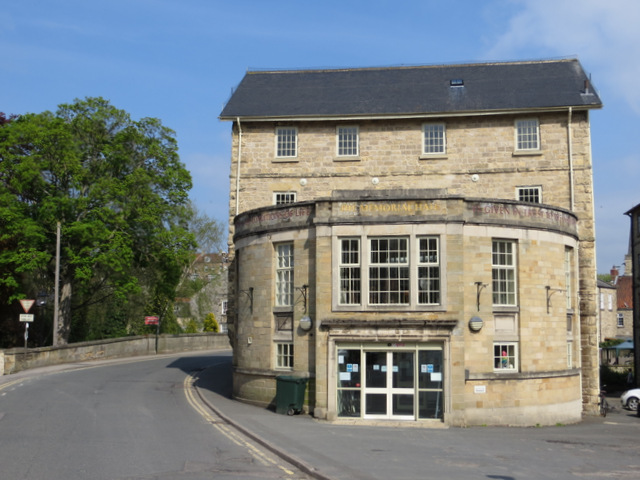
Pickering Memorial Hall

At the 1901 census, Pickering had 3,491 people and by 1911 this had risen to 3,674 who were living in 784 households. There were more than 60 shops. In the early 20th century the growth of non-conformist religious sects, particularly Methodism, generated a political spirit of Liberalism and Pickering built a great Liberal tradition.

In 1901 the Catholic priest Fr Edward Bryan came to the town and established a school, parish and, in 1911, St Joseph's Church, the work of the architect Leonard Stokes. It contains a font by the celebrated sculptor Eric Gill.

In 1919 an old mill was converted to the Pickering Memorial Hall in memory of the local men killed in the First World War. This hall, now modernised, serves as a community centre. The Castle Cinema was built in 1937 in Burgate. Electricity had arrived a few years earlier.

The years from 1920 to 1950 saw a decline in Pickering's role as an agricultural market town. In addition, railway closures started in 1950, with the closure of the line to Thornton-le-Dale, and in 1953, with the closure of the line to Kirkbymoorside. In 1965 the line from the junction at Rillington via Pickering to Whitby closed to passengers as a result of the Beeching axe, with freight continuing until the following year. The line south from Pickering station was lifted and its site is now occupied by a street and car park (The Ropery), but the line north was eventually saved by the North Yorkshire Moors Railway and reopened as a heritage railway in 1973.

The economy of the town saw a turn around in the following decades with the greater mobility of the working population and a rise in tourism due to increasing car ownership. Tourism is a major occupation since the reopening of the North Yorkshire Moors Railway as a restored steam railway and the filming of the television series Heartbeat on the moors. In 1991 the population was 6,269.

== Geography ==
=== Situation ===
Location of Pickering

Pickering is situated at the junction of the A170, which links Scarborough with Thirsk, and the A169 linking Malton and Whitby. It occupies a broad strip of land between the Ings and Low Carrs to the south of the main road and a ridge of higher, sloping ground which is surmounted by the castle to the north. It is sited where the older limestone and sandstone rocks of the North York Moors meet the glacial deposits of the Vale of Pickering. The limestone rocks form the hill on which the higher parts of the town and the castle are situated.

Pickering Beck is a watercourse that runs north to south through the centre of the town. It rises on the moors and drains southwards through Newton Dale before reaching Pickering. It is prone to flooding at times of exceptional rainfall when areas of town close to the beck become flooded. The town centre lies east of the beck, though the population is almost equally divided between its east and west wards. Pickering has developed around the old Market Place but the majority of houses are now in the residential estates off the main A170 road.

=== Physical geography ===
To the north of Pickering is the high moorland of the North York Moors, rising from 160 feet (49 m) above sea level at its southern edge to over 1,410 feet (430 m) on Urra Moor. It is dissected by a series of south-flowing streams which include Pickering Beck. Most of the moorland consists of Jurassic sandstone with occasional cappings of gritstone on the highest hills.

To the south these rocks are overlaid with oolitic limestone which forms flat-topped tabular hills with an escarpment to the north and gentler slopes to the south. Ice action in the last glaciation deepened pre-existing valleys, and determined the line of the rivers and streams. Newtondale to the north of Pickering was cut by meltwater from ice in Eskdale gouging a deep channel as it flowed southwards to the lake which filled the Vale of Pickering. This lake was blocked by ice and glacial deposits near the coast so it drained through the Kirkham Gorge towards the River Ouse.

South of Pickering, extensive marshes have been drained and exploited as fertile agricultural land.

=== Climate ===
Located in the northern part of the UK, Pickering has a temperate maritime climate which is dominated by the passage of mid-latitude depressions. The weather is very changeable from day to day and the warming influence of the Gulf Stream makes the region mild for its latitude. The average total annual rainfall is 729 mm with rain falling on 128 days of the year. January is usually the coldest month and December the wettest. The warmest month is August and the driest is February.

Climate data for High Mowthorpe: Average maximum and minimum temperatures, and average rainfall recorded between 1991 and 2020 by the Met Office. elevation: 175 m (574 ft)
Month	Jan	Feb	Mar	Apr	May	Jun	Jul	Aug	Sep	Oct	Nov	Dec	Year
Mean daily maximum °C (°F)	5.7 (42.3)	6.4 (43.5)	8.6 (47.5)	11.4 (52.5)	14.4 (57.9)	17.3 (63.1)	19.9 (67.8)	20.0 (68.0)	16.8 (62.2)	12.7 (54.9)	8.7 (47.7)	6.2 (43.2)	12.4 (54.3)
Mean daily minimum °C (°F)	0.9 (33.6)	1.0 (33.8)	2.1 (35.8)	3.8 (38.8)	6.3 (43.3)	8.9 (48.0)	11.0 (51.8)	11.3 (52.3)	9.6 (49.3)	6.9 (44.4)	3.7 (38.7)	1.3 (34.3)	5.6 (42.1)
Average precipitation mm (inches)	64.8 (2.55)	55.5 (2.19)	48.8 (1.92)	55.4 (2.18)	51.4 (2.02)	75.0 (2.95)	63.6 (2.50)	71.8 (2.83)	62.3 (2.45)	72.5 (2.85)	79.3 (3.12)	70.6 (2.78)	771.1 (30.36)
Average precipitation days (≥ 1.0 mm)	12.6	11.7	9.8	9.5	9.4	10.6	10.6	11.1	9.7	12.2	13.7	12.6	133.6
Mean monthly sunshine hours	54.8	81.2	120.9	161.0	208.5	188.4	198.0	181.2	141.6	104.3	65.8	51.1	1,557.1
Source: Met Office

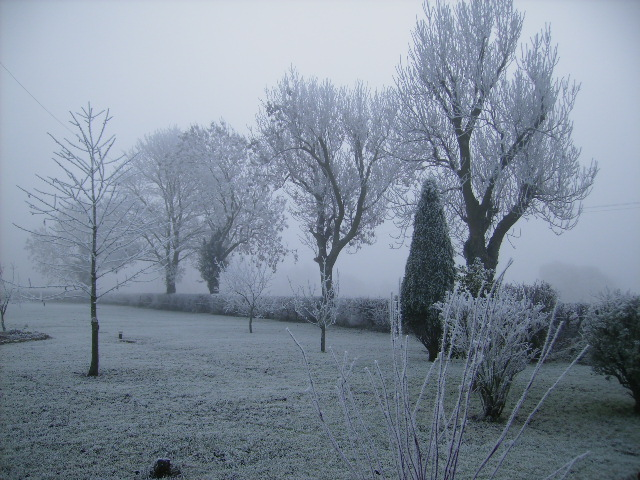
Heavy frost near Pickering. The temperature was −2 °C when this picture was taken.

=== Flooding ===
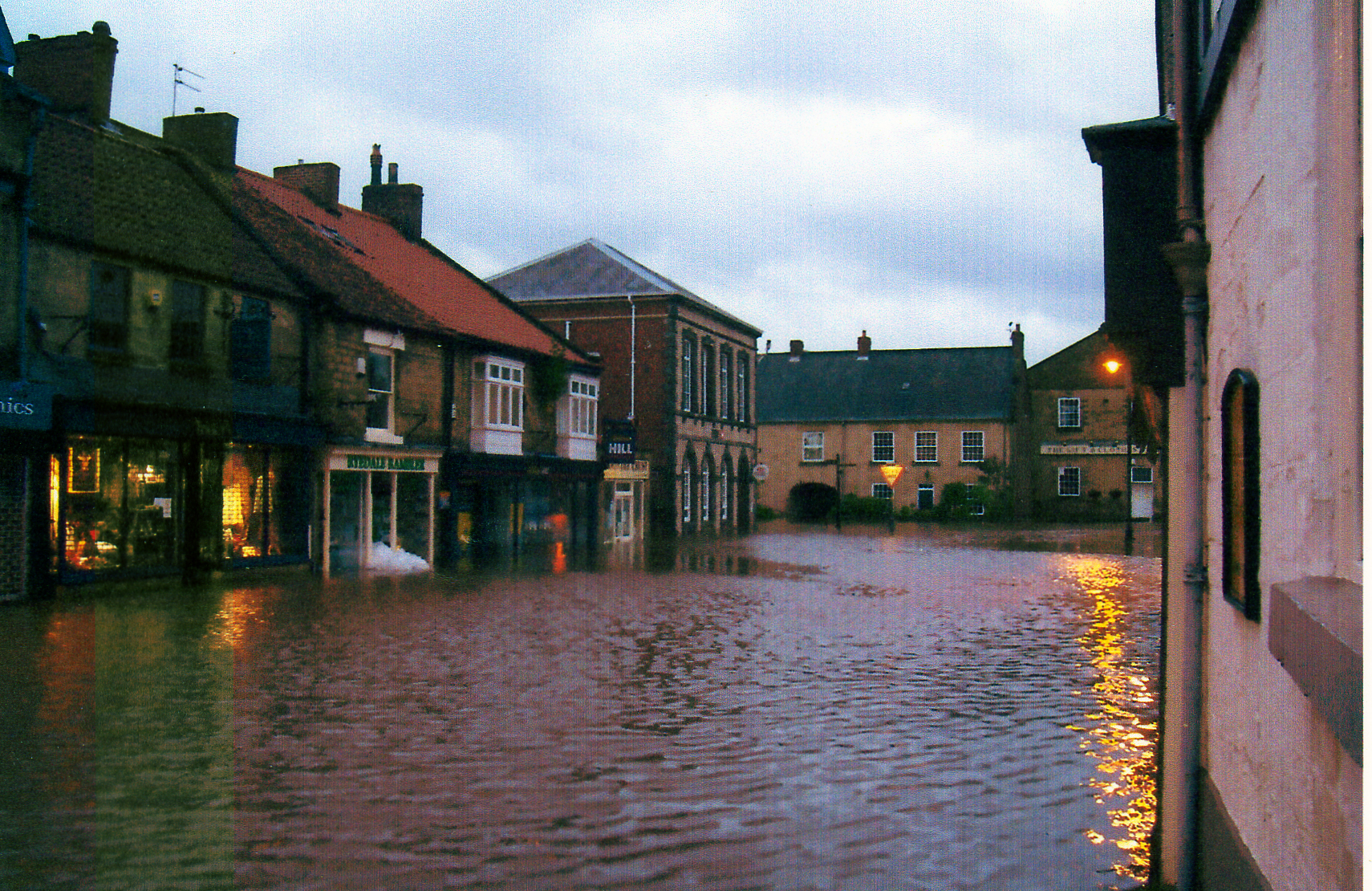
A week of extremely heavy rain in late June 2007 resulted in extensive flooding on 26 June.

Pickering Beck has a history of flooding, which occurs on average every five years. However, out-of-bank flows are experienced on some sections of the watercourse annually. These areas include Potter Hill and the grassed area upstream of Pickering Bridge. The flood in March 1999 caused widespread damage to the town. Flooding in 2007 again caused extensive damage to properties in Beck Isle, Park Street, Market Place and the Ropery.

Since 2007, Pickering has planted trees and built 167 retaining dams above the town to keep back water.

=== Demography ===
According to the United Kingdom Census 2001 Pickering had a population of 6,846 people in 3,071 households. There were 3,213 males and 3,633 females. The mean age of the population for the East Ward was 45.30 years and for the West Ward it was 43.47 years. Both of these ages are significantly higher than the national mean age of 38.6 years. In the census year 25.39% of Pickering's population was over 65 years compared with 15.89% nationally. There were 1,183 people below the age of 16 and 886 over the age of 75. The census for 2011 only showed a marginal difference in population at 6,830.

== Governance ==
Pickering is in the Thirsk and Malton parliamentary constituency, which is represented in the UK Parliament by Kevin Hollinrake of the Conservative Party.

From 1974 until 2023 Pickering was part of the district of Ryedale in the county of North Yorkshire. Since 2023, it has been part of the unitary authority area of North Yorkshire. Pickering is represented on the North Yorkshire Council by Joy Andrews of the Liberal Party.

As a town and civil parish, Pickering also has a town council, with 12 elected councillors and 4 members of staff. It is responsible for a number of local services.

== Economy ==
Pickering is an important tourist centre and there are banking, insurance and legal services in the town as well as an outdoor market each Monday. Pickering has two main shopping areas, Market Place, which is by far the larger, and Eastgate Square, which is a mixed housing and retail development. There are two supermarkets, operated by Lidl and the Co-op, and a farmers' market is held on the last Saturday of each month (March to November).

There are few large employers in the town. Most people find jobs in retailing, health and social work and small manufacturing industries based in the two industrial development areas at Westgate Carr Road and Thornton Road to the west and east of the town respectively.

Between 1971 and 1974, a natural gas processing facility operated in Pickering, processing gas from the Lockton gas field. This was discovered under the North York Moors National Park by the Home Oil Company of Canada in 1966. By 1974 aquifer water ingress into the gas reservoir had significantly reduced gas production to about 1 million ft^{3} (28 thousand m^{3}) per day, and the production and gas treatment facility was permanently shut down in October 1974. Over three years it had produced 11.3 billion ft^{3} (320 million m^{3}) at standard conditions, only 4.5% of the estimated recoverable reserves.

== Culture, media and sport ==
There are three theatre venues in the town, including the Kirk Theatre, offering a very wide range of amateur and professional productions. In July the annual Jazz Festival is held in Pickering.

There is a leisure centre, a swimming pool and a modern library and information centre. Sports activities include athletics, football, cricket, badminton and bowls. Pickering is home to Pickering Town F.C., who currently play in the Premier Division of the Northern Counties East League, Level 9 of the football league pyramid. Notable sports-people from the town include, footballing brothers Craig Short and Chris Short, and snooker player Paul Davison.

Local news and television programmes are provided by BBC Yorkshire and BBC North East and Cumbria on BBC One & ITV Yorkshire and ITV Tyne Tees on ITV1. Television signals can be received from either Emley Moor or Bilsdale TV transmitters. Pickering's local radio stations are BBC Radio York, Greatest Hits Radio Yorkshire and Heart Yorkshire.

Local newspapers are

- Ryedale Mercury (weekly)
- The Scarborough News (weekly)
- Evening Press (daily)
- Gazette and Herald, (Ryedale) (weekly)

Notable residents of Pickering have included Dorothy Cowlin who wrote many articles about the area and its people.

== Places of interest ==
=== Pickering Castle ===
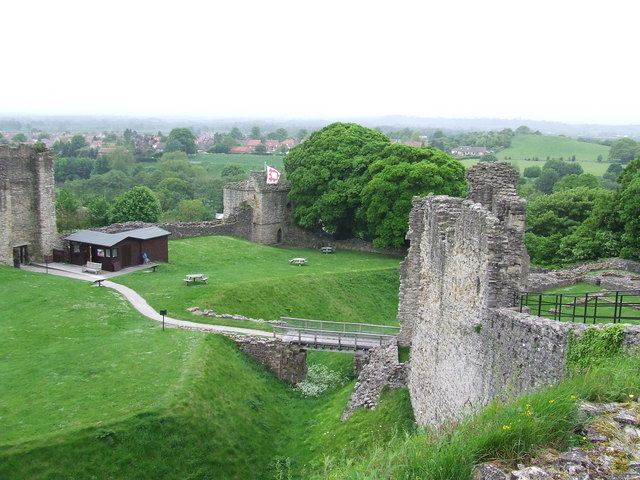
Pickering Castle seen from the top of the motte, with the Vale of Pickering beyond

Pickering Castle is situated in the north of the town, at the edge of the moors. It is a classic, well-preserved example of an early motte and bailey castle, built shortly after the Norman Conquest, and refortified in stone during the 13th and 14th centuries. It was largely unaffected by the 15th-century Wars of the Roses, but during the 17th century Civil War it was held for the king and extensively damaged by attacking forces under Cromwell.

The remains of the castle includes most of the curtain wall and inner and outer wards, centred upon a shell keep crowning an impressive motte. There is an exhibition in the chapel. The castle is owned by the Duchy of Lancaster and managed by English Heritage.

=== Beck Isle Museum ===
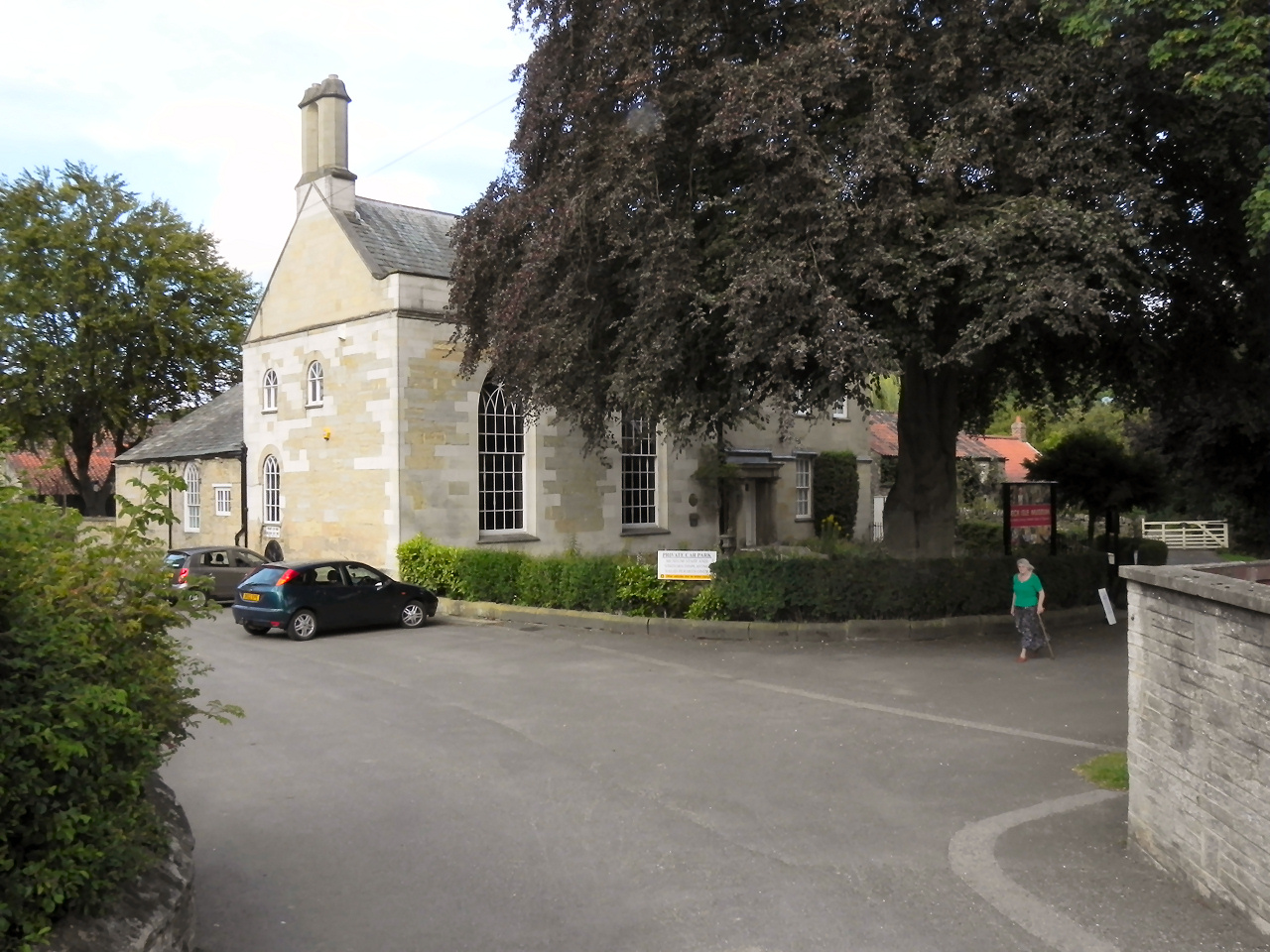
Beck Isle Museum

The Beck Isle Museum is housed in a Regency period residence near the centre of town, adjacent to the Pickering Beck, a stream that flows under a four-arched road bridge. It was here that William Marshall planned England's first Agricultural Institute in the early 19th century. The house contains a collection of bygones relating to the rural crafts and living style of Ryedale. The collection is not restricted to a particular period, but aims to reflect local life and customs and trace the developments in social and domestic life during the last 200 years. The museum is owned by the Beck Isle Museum Trust and is staffed and operated by volunteers.

=== North York Moors ===
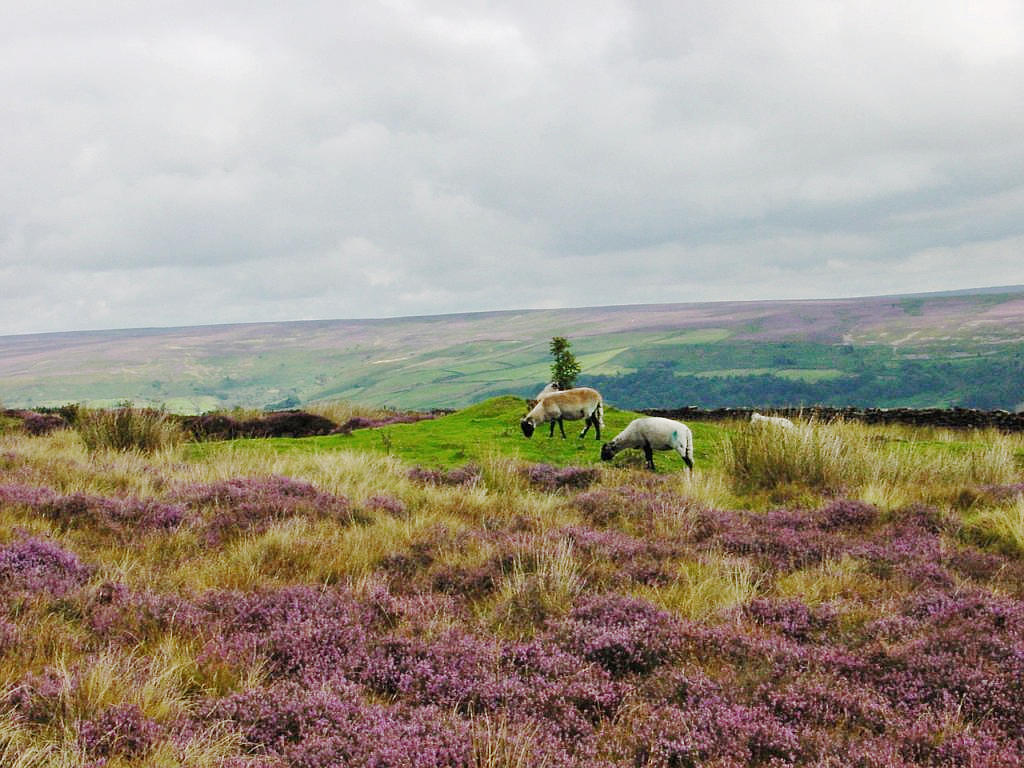
The North York Moors

Pickering lies at the middle of the southern edge of the North York Moors, where the moors meet the Vale of Pickering. Covering an area of 554 sq mi (1,430 km^{2}), the moors are an upland area that contains one of the largest expanses of heather moorland in the United Kingdom, whilst some 23% is under woodland cover. To the north and west they stretch as far as the steep scarp slopes of the Cleveland Hills and Hambleton Hills overlooking the Vale of Mowbray, whilst to the east they end with the impressive cliffs of the North Sea coast.

The landscape was formed in the last ice age and shaped by the people of the Bronze Age to the present day. The North York Moors were designated as a national park in 1952, and the park authority works to promote enjoyment and encourage understanding of the area by the public and balance it with conservation. This includes producing information and interpretation, managing public rights of way and access areas, car parks and toilets and having a Ranger Service.

=== Dalby Forest ===
Dalby Forest is on the southern slopes of the North York Moors National Park, to the north and east of Pickering, and accessible through the 9-mile (14 km) Dalby Forest Drive. The southern part of the forest is divided by valleys whilst to the north, the forest sits on the upland plateau. Although the forest is mostly pine and spruce, there are many broadleaf trees in the valleys and on the ridges. Clear streams arising as springs run through the forest, which is home to the crossbill and the nightjar. Roe deer abound and badgers, the symbol of the forest, are a common but nocturnal resident. The signs of the past are evidenced in burial mounds, linear earthworks of unknown purpose, and the remains of a rabbit warrening industry can be found in the wood.

=== North Yorkshire Moors Railway ===
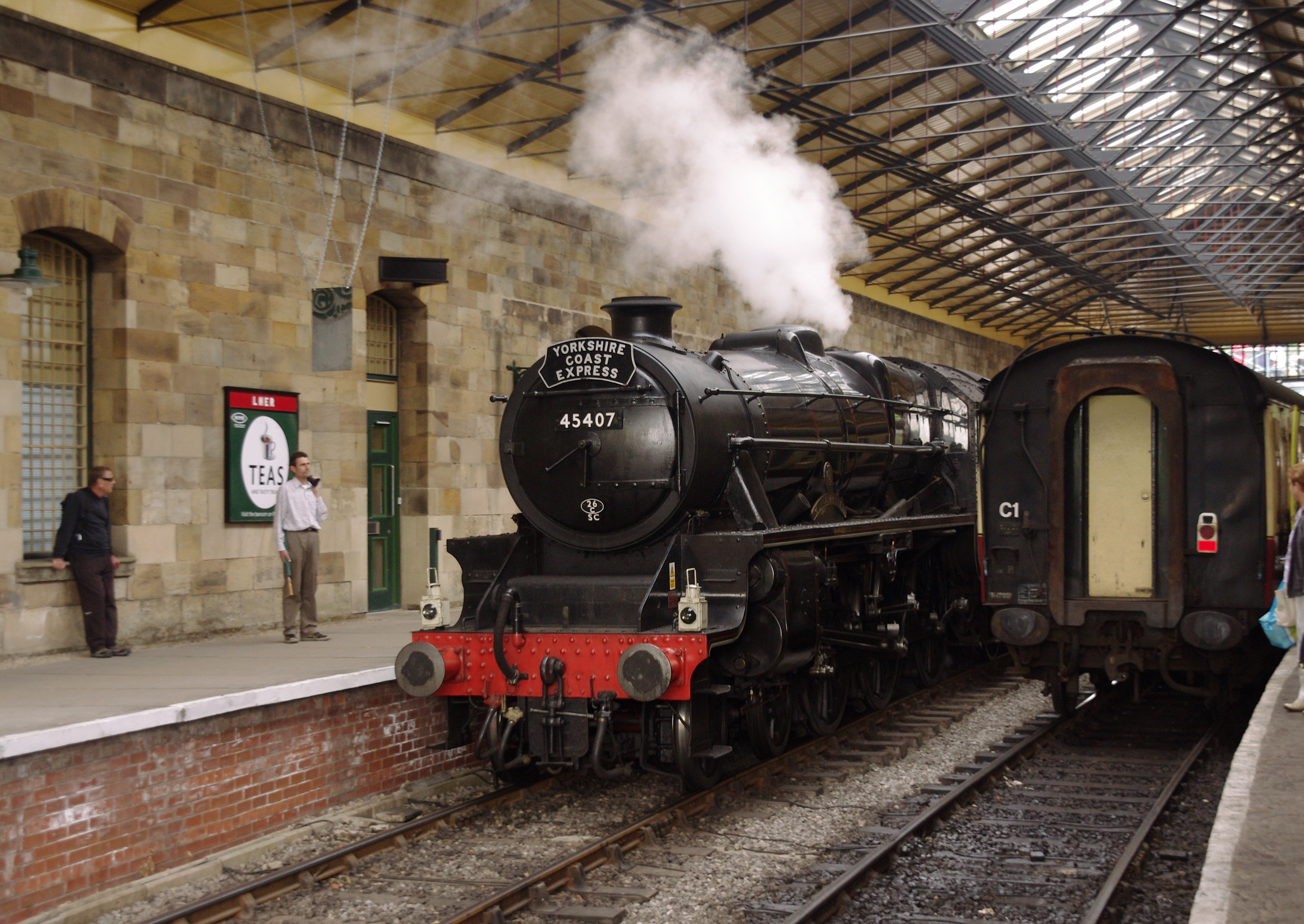
Pickering station on the heritage railway

Pickering railway station is the southern terminus of the North Yorkshire Moors Railway and lies in the centre of the town. The 18-mile (29 km) line is the second-longest heritage railway in the United Kingdom and runs across the North York Moors from Pickering via Levisham, Newton Dale and Goathland to Grosmont. Trains run daily from mid-March to early November and on selected dates through the winter. Trains are mostly steam-hauled; however in some cases heritage diesel engine is used. At the height of the running timetable, trains depart hourly from each station. During the summer months, steam services extend to the seaside town of Whitby. Passenger numbers have topped 350,000 in recent years.

=== Trail ===
The Castle, North Yorkshire Moors Railway, Beck Isle Museum, and St Peter and St Paul's Church are linked by a "Pixie Trail" launched in 2025 which highlights the carved and decorated "pixie houses" located around the town.

=== Listed buildings ===
The Market Place has many listed buildings

The civil parish of Pickering contains over 250 listed buildings that are recorded in the National Heritage List for England. Of these, the parish church (see below) is listed at Grade I (the highest of the three grades), the Beck Isle Museum (see above) is at Grade II* (the middle grade), and the others are at Grade II (the lowest grade). The buildings are spread across the town centre, which is also designated as a conservation area, and the surrounding countryside. Most of the listed buildings in the town centre are houses, cottages and associated structures, shops and offices, and in the countryside most are farmhouses and farm buildings. The other listed buildings include churches, hotels and public houses, bridges, mills, a railway station, a signal box, and a telephone kiosk.

== Religion ==
=== Parish Church ===
Beheading of Saint John the Baptist

Pickering Parish Church is at the eastern end of the Market Place and dominates views of Pickering from all directions. It is a Grade I Listed building that dates from the 12th century. It is notable for its mid-15th-century wall paintings, which cover the north and south walls. The wall paintings were covered over at the Reformation, but rediscovered in 1852. They were painted over once more, but were restored in the 1870s. The church is open every day. North of the church at the top of the hill is Pickering Castle, which was built in the late 11th century to defend the area against the Scots and Danes. The sloping Market Place between the church and the beck is lined with two- and three-storey buildings dating from a variety of periods. Most are listed for their historical or architectural interest. This area is the centre of the town's main Conservation Area.

Pickering Church has an Anglo-Saxon foundation, but the earliest phases of the present building date to the 12th and 13th centuries, with substantial additions in the 14th and 15th. In 1852 restoration work revealed a series of wall paintings on the north and south walls of the nave. Despite a local and national outcry, the paintings were whitewashed, and only rediscovered and restored in 1876–78. They have been called "the most complete collection of medieval wall paintings in England".

=== Saint Joseph's Church ===
Saint Joseph's Roman Catholic Church, on Potter Hill, was designed by the architect Leonard Stokes in 1911, on the instructions of the parish priest, Fr Edward Bryan. It contains a stone font by the sculptor Eric Gill, and the portable altar-stone of the 17th-century martyr Blessed Nicholas Postgate; also a fine icon, painted in Rome, of Our Lady of Perpetual Succour, and a mosaic of Christ blessing the loaves and fishes by local artist Audrey Murty. Outside the church is a statue of Saint Joseph designed by Peter Paul Pugin, son of Augustus Welby Pugin. The church features in the book A Glimpse of Heaven by Christopher Martin (English Heritage 2006).

== Transport ==
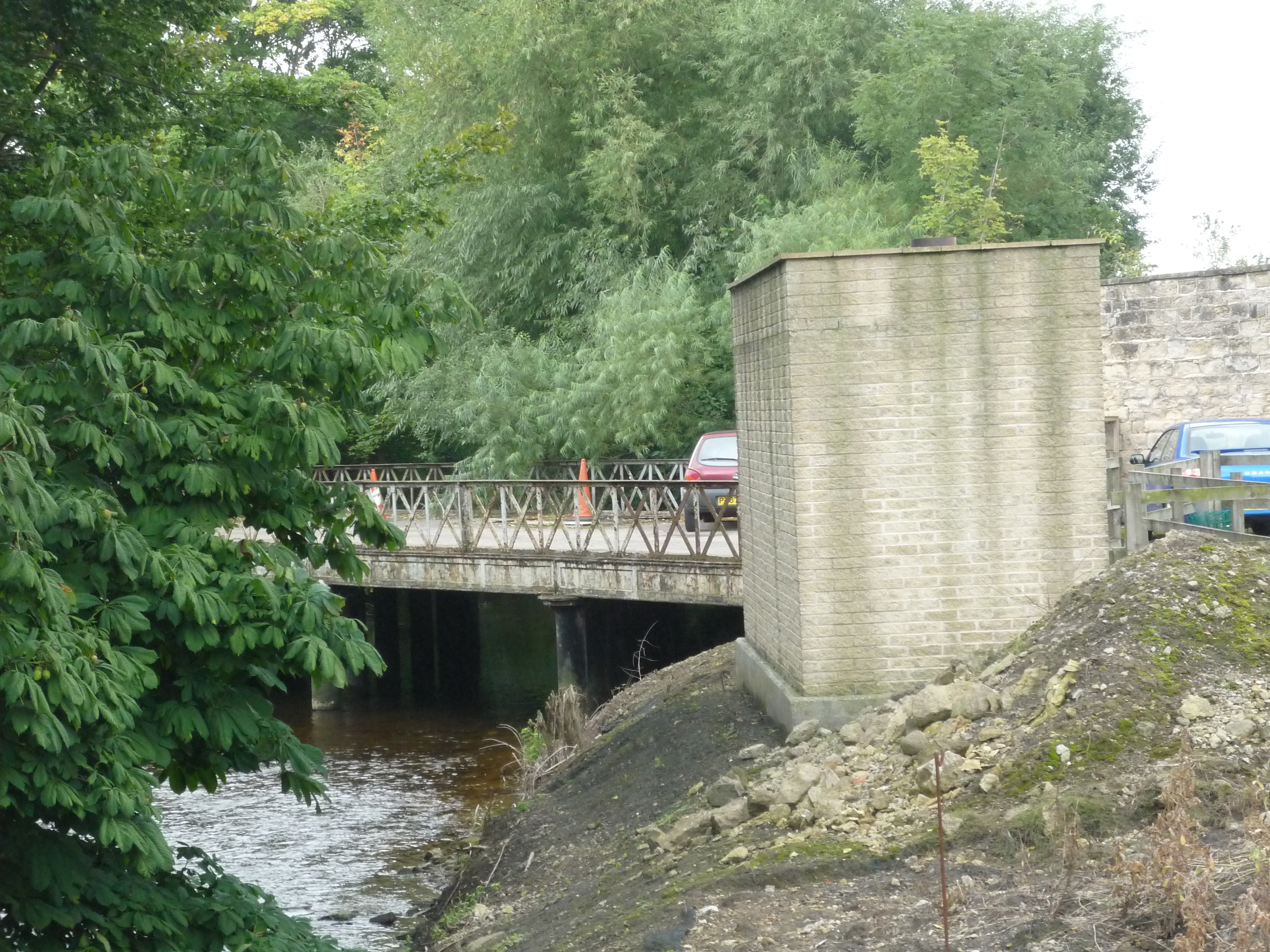
Former railway bridge over Pickering Beck

Pickering lies on the A170 road that connects Thirsk, Helmsley and Kirkbymoorside, to the west, and Thornton-le-Dale and Scarborough, to the east, following the southern edge of the North Yorkshire Moors for much of its route. This is crossed in the town by the A169 road that connects to the south across the Vale of Pickering to Malton, and to the north across the North Yorkshire Moors to Whitby.

Yorkshire Coastliner operates bus route 840, linking Pickering with Whitby to the north and Malton, York and Leeds to the south. East Yorkshire's route 128 connects Pickering with Helmsley to the west and Scarborough to the east. Additional services between Pickering and Scarborough are provided by East Yorkshire’s route X3. Viscount Travel’s route X28 also links the town with Malton and Scarborough.

The nearest mainline railway station is Malton, 8 miles (13 km) away. The North Yorkshire Moors Railway runs seasonal heritage services from Pickering to Grosmont and Whitby. Proposals to reopen a railway line to join the Scarborough line near Rillington have not proceeded.

== Education ==
=== Adult and community ===
- Askham Bryan College's facility on Swainsea Lane was closed in 2008.

=== Pre-school ===
- Parish Hall Toddler and Playgroup
- Methodist Hall Toddler and Playgroup
- St Joseph's Catholic Primary School from 3 years old
- Humpty Dumpty Nursery, Firthlands Road

=== Primary schools ===
- Pickering Community Infant School, Ruffa Lane
- Pickering Community Junior School, Middleton Road
- St Josephs Roman Catholic Primary School, Swainsea Lane.

=== Secondary school ===
- Lady Lumley's School, Swainsea Lane

== Arms ==
Coat of arms of Pickering, North Yorkshire

Notes
Granted to Pickering Urban District Council 15 September 1961, transferred to Pickering Town Council 11 April 2001.
Crest
On a wreath Argent and Gules a pike fesswise Argent in the mouth an annulet Or.
Escutcheon
Per fess Argent and barry wavy Azure and Argent above a castle an ancient crown Gules on a chief of the last three roses Argent barbed and seeded Proper.
Motto
Ever Loyal
