= Pickering Memorial Hall =

Town hall in Pickering, North Yorkshire, England

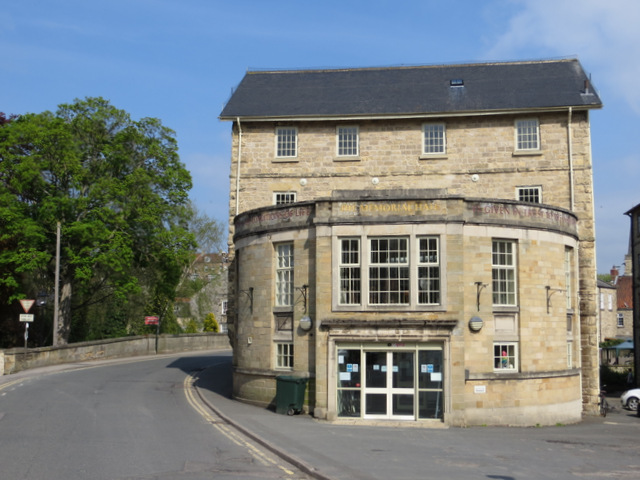
- The building in May 2013

- Shown in North Yorkshire
- 54.2465°N 0.7800°W
- Location: Potter Hill, Pickering

History
- Built: 1865

Site notes
- Architectural style: Neoclassical style

Listed Building – Grade II
- Official name: Memorial Hall, Pickering
- Designated: 27 November 1975
- Reference no.: 1260382

Pickering Memorial Hall is a historic municipal building in Pickering, North Yorkshire, a town in England. The building, which is used as a community events venue and houses the headquarters of Pickering Town Council, is a grade II listed building.

== History ==
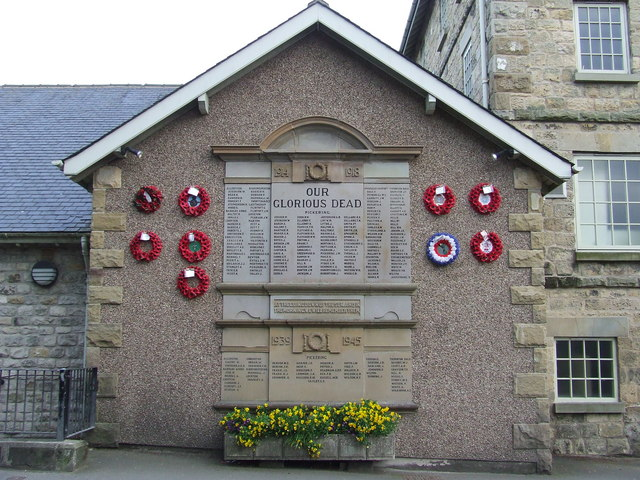
The war memorial

The building was constructed as a corn mill, powered by steam and completed in 1865. In 1919, the owner, Arthur Kitching, gave the mill to the Pickering Urban District Council. The council converted it at a cost of £3,736, financed by public subscription, and dedicated it to the memory of those who had died in the First World War. Memorial tablets recording the names of local service personnel who had died in the war were unveiled by General Sir Ivor Maxse on 16 April 1922. The building itself was then officially opened for public use on 26 April 1922.

The new building became the offices of the council. A museum created from a collection of archaeological items accumulated by a local clinician, John Kirk, was established on the first floor of the building in 1929. A swimming pool was installed in 1930, while the museum relocated to become York Castle Museum in 1933.

A library and reading rooms were later additions, and during the Second World War, part of the building was used as a British Restaurant. The building was extended in the 1950s, the most prominent addition being the semicircular front. The building continued to serve as the offices of Pickering Urban District Council for much of the 20th century, but ceased to be the local seat of government when Ryedale District Council was formed in 1974. In the 1990s, the building was refurbished and rearranged, and the swimming pool was filled in, allowing the whole building to be used as a community events venue. The building has been grade II listed since 1975.

== Architecture ==
The four-storey building is constructed of stone with rusticated quoins, floor bands, and an overhanging gabled roof. On the north front is a single-storey projecting gabled and rendered war memorial extension. At the west end is a two-storey semi-circular entrance extension.

== See also ==
- Listed buildings in Pickering, North Yorkshire
