= Hole of Horcum =

Valley in the North York Moors, England

- Valley
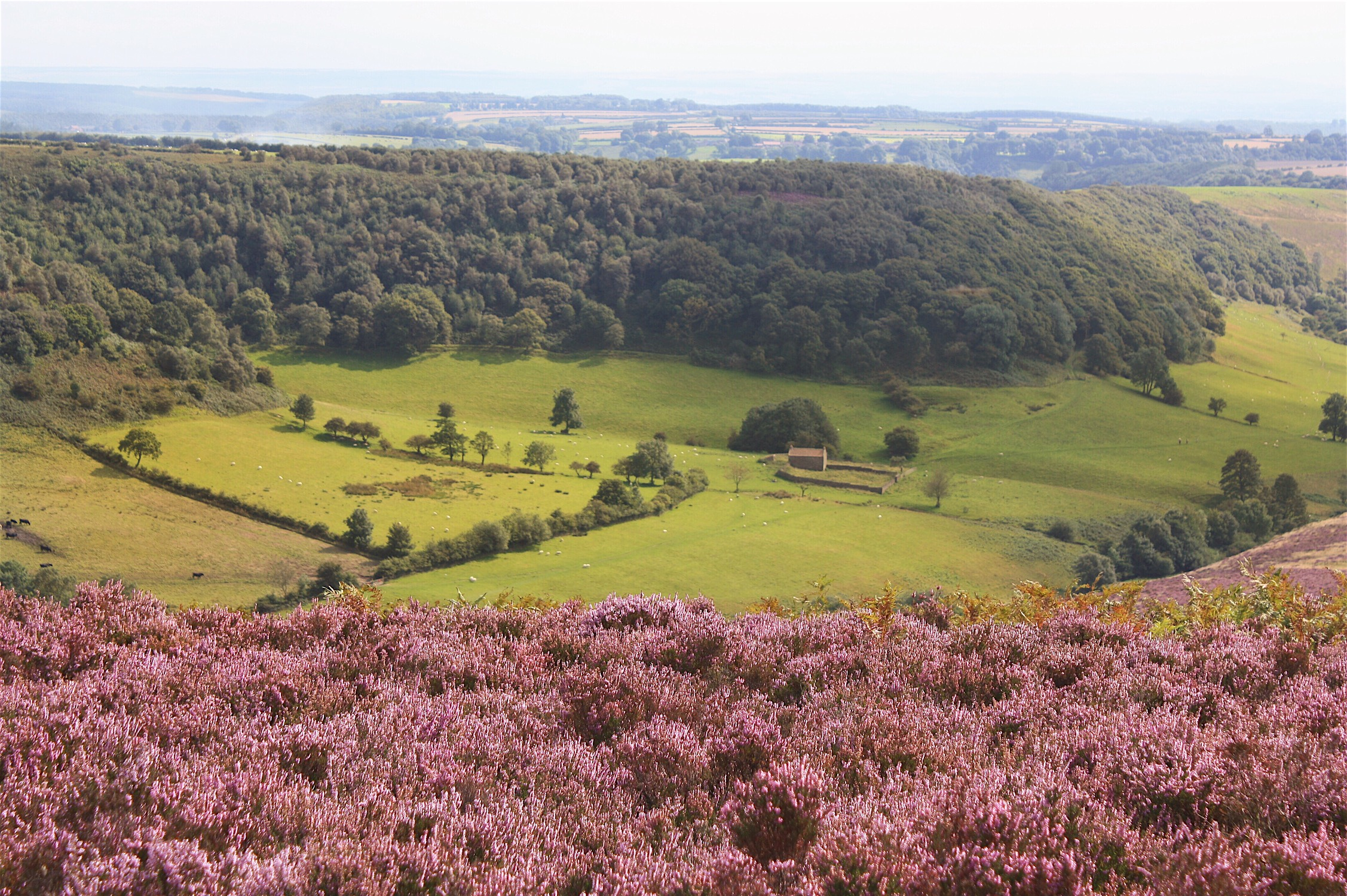
- Hole of Horcum from the north, with flowering heather in the foreground, August 2017

- Location in North Yorkshire
- Coordinates: 54.331266°N 0.701168°W
- Grid position: SE845935
- Location: North Yorkshire, England

The Hole of Horcum is a section of the valley of the Levisham Beck, upstream of Levisham and Lockton, in the Tabular Hills of the North York Moors National Park in northern England.

== Etymology ==
Early forms of the name include Hotcumbe, Holcumbe, Horcombe and Horkome. The first element of the name is Old English horh, meaning "filth", while the suffix, cumb, means "bowl-shaped valley", and is of Brittonic Celtic origin.

== The Hole ==
The hollow is 400 feet (120 m) deep and about ¾ mile (1.2 km) across. The Hole was created by a process called spring-sapping, where water welling up from the hillside gradually undermined the slopes above, eating the rocks away grain by grain. In this way, over thousands of years, a once narrow valley widened and deepened into an enormous cauldron. The process continues today.

== Legend ==
Local legend has it that the "Devil's Punchbowl"-type feature, the amphitheatre, was formed when Wade the Giant scooped up a handful of earth to throw at his wife during an argument.

== Panoramic view ==
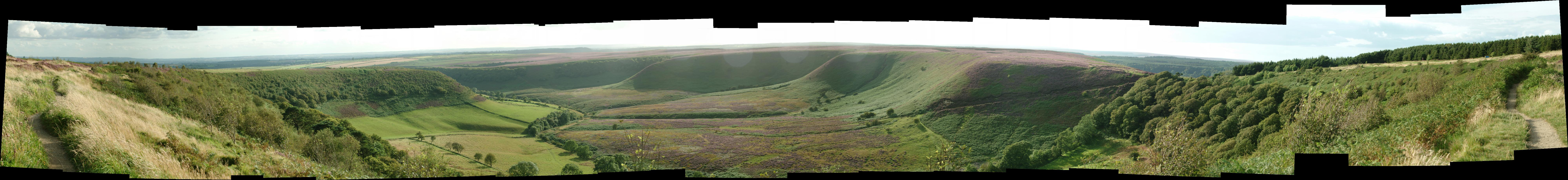
A panorama of Hole of Horcum in early evening light, looking west
