= Pickering Castle =

Castle in North Yorkshire, England

- Pickering, North Yorkshire, England
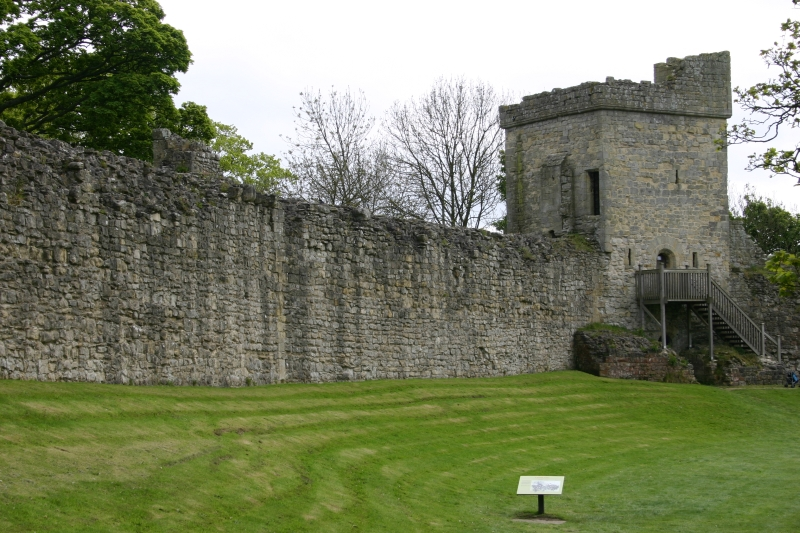
- Defensive wall and tower of Pickering castle

Site information
- Type: Motte and Bailey castle
- Owner: English Heritage
- Website: Pickering Castle

Location
- Coordinates: 54°15′0″N 0°46′32″W
- Grid reference: SE7984

Pickering Castle is a motte-and-bailey fortification in Pickering, North Yorkshire, England. The original castle was made of timber, and the later stone castle was a temporary prison for Richard II in 1399.

The castle is owned by the Duchy of Lancaster and managed by English Heritage.

== Design ==
Pickering Castle was originally a timber and earth motte and bailey castle. It was developed into a stone motte and bailey castle which had a stone shell keep. The current inner ward was originally the bailey, and was built between 1180 and 1187. The keep was developed into a stone shell keep sometime during the years 1216 to 1236 along with the chapel – there is a reconstruction of the chapel at the site. Between the years 1323 and 1326 there was an outer ward and curtain wall built, along with three towers. There were also two ditches, one situated outside of the curtain wall and one in the outer ward. After this a gatehouse, ovens, hall and the storehouses were built. The castle is situated in the Vale of Pickering and has a considerably steep cliff on the west side which would have been a great defensive attribute.

== History ==
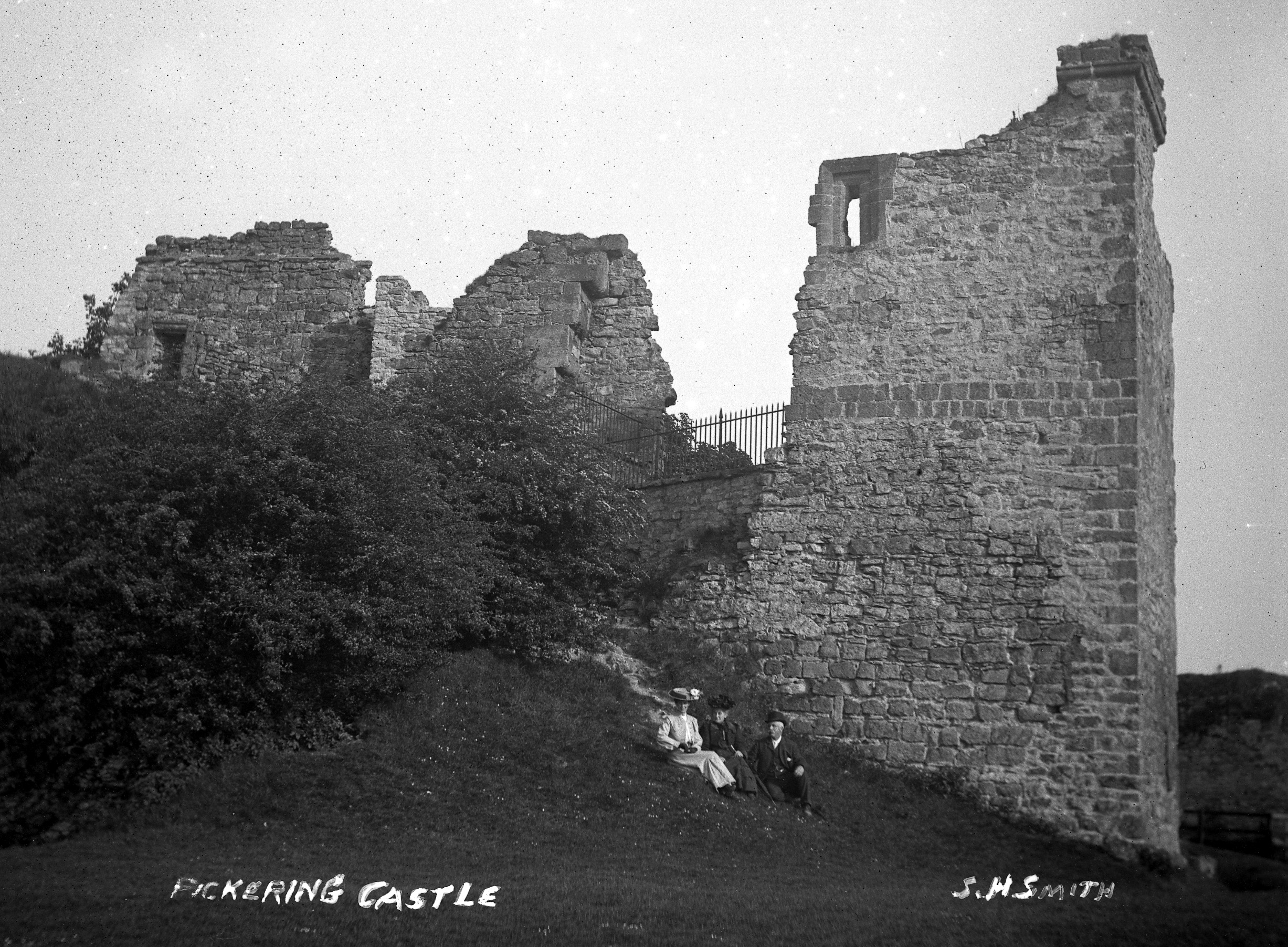
Pickering Castle in around 1910

The original structure was built by the Normans under William the Conqueror in 1069–1070. This early building included the large, central mound (the motte), the outer palisades (enclosing the bailey) and internal buildings, notably the keep on top of the motte. Ditches were also dug to make assault on the walls difficult. The main purpose of the castle at this time was to maintain control of the area after the Harrying of the North, though by 1322, the defences had been re-fortified on the orders of Edward II who had narrowly escaped capture by the Scots during battles in the same year. At the same time, due to the fears about the Scottish invasions, the garrison was strengthened. When Richard II of England was deposed as king, he was held prisoner in the castle (c. 1399) until his removal to Pontefract.

Its remains are particularly well-preserved because it is one of only a few castles which were largely unaffected by the 15th-century Wars of the Roses and the English Civil War of the 17th century. However, during the civil war, the castle was held for the king and was breached on its west side, with most part of this side being dismantled. Three mounds to the west of the castle are said to have been the positions that Cromwell's forces placed their canons to destroy the west wall. Later in the conflict, Parliamentary troops occupied the site and Sir Hugh Cholmeley stripped the lead, timber, and iron from the towers of the castle to provide extra defences for Scarborough Castle.

In 1926, the Ministry of Works (the predecessor of English Heritage) took possession of the castle. It is a Scheduled Monument and open to the public.

== See also ==
- Castles in Great Britain and Ireland
- List of castles in England
- The Pickering Wall Paintings
