= Tabular Hills =

Line of hills in North Yorkshire, England

Coordinates: 54.300°N 0.825°W

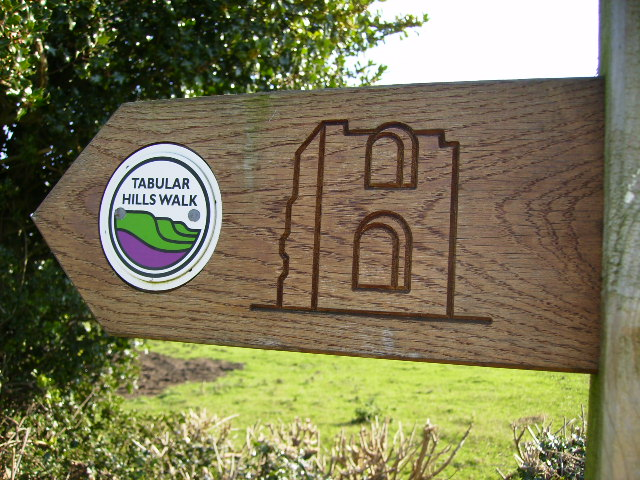
Tabular Hills link walk signpost

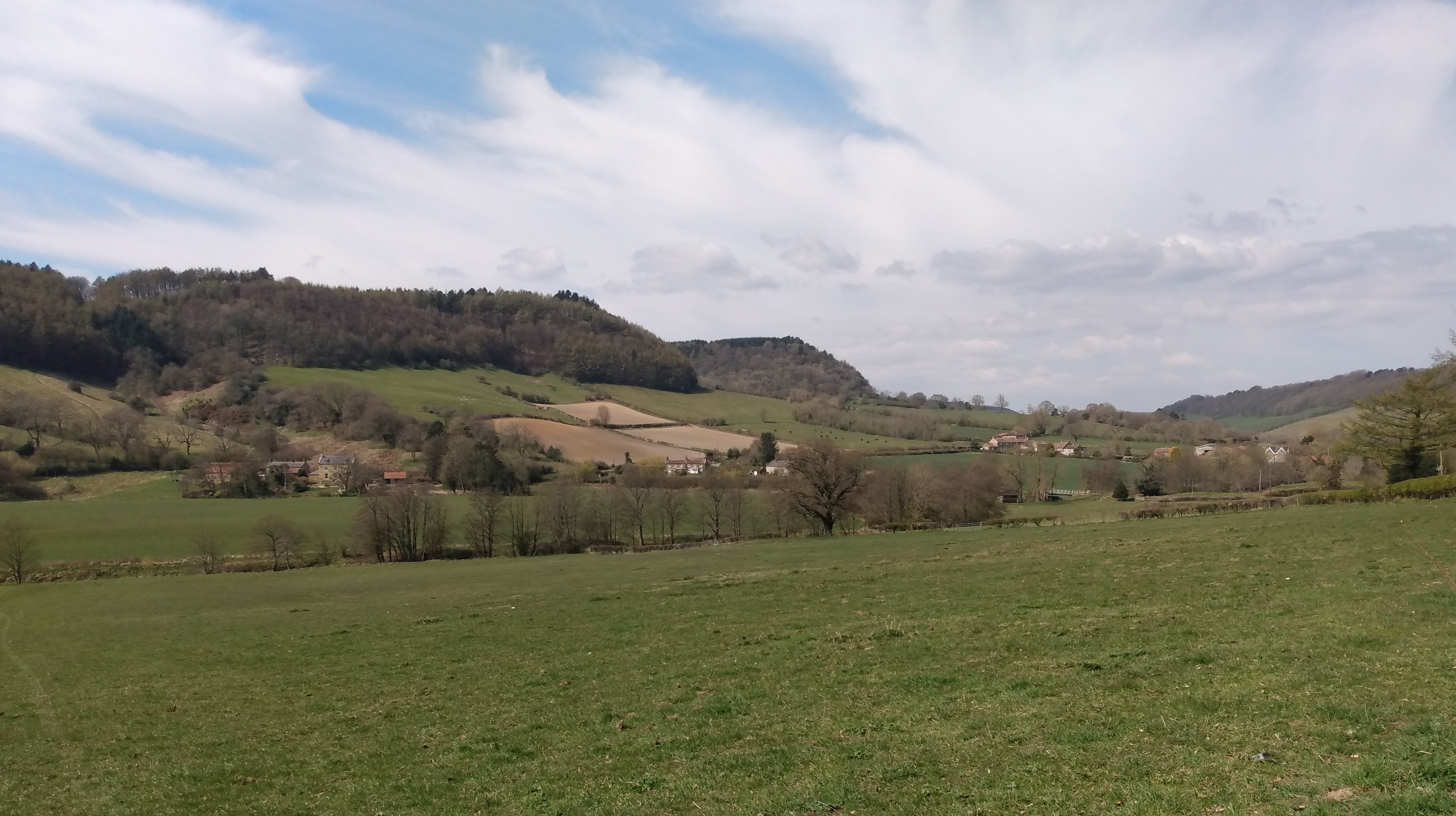
Northern escarpment of the Tabular Hills along the Derwent valley, near Wrench Green

The Tabular Hills form an east–west line along the southern bounds of the North York Moors, between Scarborough in the east and Black Hambleton in the west. The name refers to their flat summits composed of hard Corallian limestone, known locally as "nabs". They form the northern boundary of the Vale of Pickering.

== Description ==
Steep-sided river valleys break through the Tabular Hills to form a broken series of tablet-shaped hills. The most distinctive feature is their northern escarpment, which rises to about 200 ft (60 m) above the moorland to the north. At their western end, beyond the River Rye, they join with the north–south Hambleton Hills, which have a similar geological basis.

Striking among the river valleys are Newton Dale and Forge Valley – deep channels formed when an exit to the North Sea for glacial meltwater was denied by the North Sea ice-sheet, pouring over the lowest points in the local landscape during the last ice age and cutting steeply sided channels. The Hole of Horcum is a scallop-shaped valley formed by the action of a line of springs.

== Tabular Hills walk ==
The Tabular Hills walk loosely links the two southerly ends of the Cleveland Way National Trail, enabling walkers to walk the complete perimeter of the North York Moors National Park. It runs from Helmsley in the west to Scalby Mills on the North Sea coast and measures 48 miles (77 km). It crosses sparsely settled countryside between Scalby and Levisham and then touches the villages of Newton-on-Rawcliffe, Cropton, Appleton-le-Moors, Hutton-le-Hole, Gillamoor, Fadmoor and Carlton.
