= St Peter and St Paul's Church, Pickering =

St Peter and St Paul, Pickering
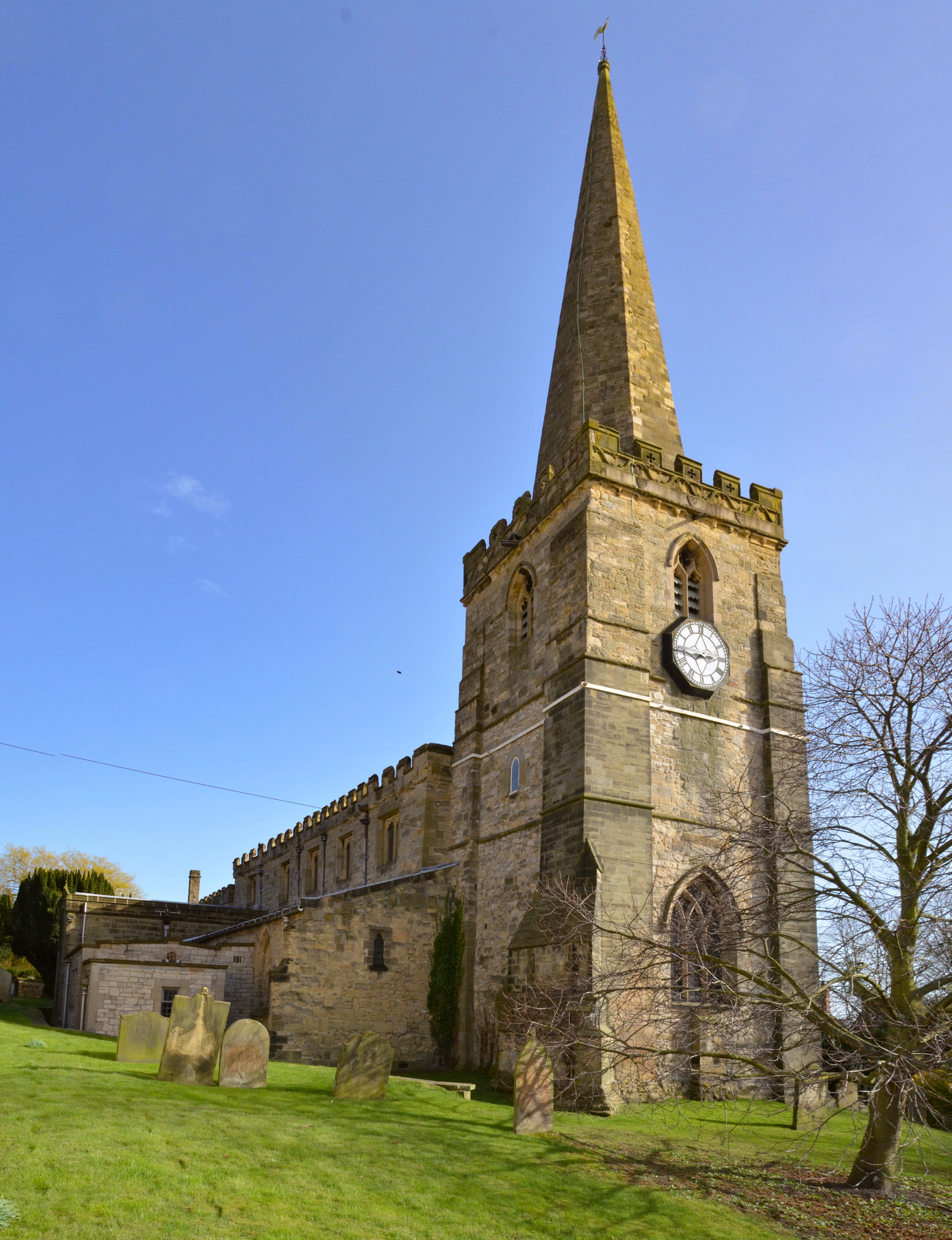
- View from north west showing bell tower, spire, and north aisle

- Location in North Yorkshire
- 54°14′45″N 0°46′32″W
- OS grid reference: SE 79888 84021
- Location: Pickering, North Yorkshire
- Country: England
- Denomination: Church of England
- Previous denomination: Roman Catholic
- Website: www.pickeringchurch.com

History
- Status: Parish church
- Founded: Saxon Period
- Dedication: St Peter and St Paul

Architecture
- Functional status: Active
- Heritage designation: Grade I
- Designated: 24 October 1950
- Architectural type: Church
- Style: Norman, English Gothic

Administration
- Province: Province of York
- Diocese: Diocese of York
- Archdeaconry: Archdeaconry of Cleveland
- Deanery: Northern Ryedale
- Parish: Pickering

The Church of St Peter and St Paul, Pickering is the parish church of the market town of Pickering in the county of North Yorkshire. The church sits on the top of a small hill in the centre of the town and its spire is visible across the Ryedale district. The church is part of the Church of England Diocese of York, and houses a collection of medieval wall paintings. It is a Grade I listed building.

== History and architecture ==
The first church to stand on the current site is believed to have been built in the Anglo-Saxon era. Little is known about the first church, but remains from its construction can be seen inside the current building, including the stone font and a carved cross shaft. The church was rebuilt in c. 1140, and significant additions were made in the following decades, including a north aisle in 1150 and the south aisle in 1190. It is to this stage of building that the elaborately carved capitals are to be dated.

In about 1200 drastic alterations were made due to the collapse of the tower, which had until then sat in the centre of the building. The tower was replaced, but with a new structure at the west end of the church, to which the spire was later added. The chancel was enlarged in 1300, in order 'to accommodate the increasingly elaborate church services of the time', resulting in the unusual situation that the east end of the church is wider than its nave.

The church features two chantry chapels, which were built to the north and south of the sanctuary: the north chantry chapel, built in 1337, originally contained the effigy of Sir William Bruce, though his remains were relocated to the chancel step in order to accommodate the present organ; the south chantry chapel, built in 1407, contains two effigies, of Sir David and Dame Margery Roucliffe, which are still in situ.

The last major structural alterations were carried out in the 15th century when the walls of the nave were raised and clerestory windows added. It was onto these that the church's wall paintings were painted.

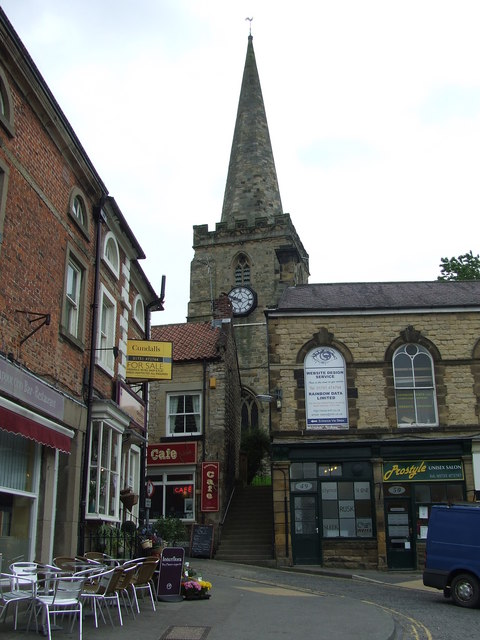
View of the Parish Church from Pickering Market Place.

== The Pickering Wall Paintings ==
View of the nave showing the bulk of the mural cycles (north to the left and south to the right).

The Pickering Wall Paintings are an exceptionally complete surviving set of late medieval murals covering the walls above the arcades and between the clerestories in the nave of Pickering Parish Church. They are among the finest surviving and best preserved of their kind in the UK and have made the building nationally and internationally notable. They are believed to have been commissioned in 1450, but were covered over in the next century with the Edwardian Reformation most likely around 1547. Their discovery in 1852 was an accident, caused by plaster falling from the wall. The Reverend John Ponsonby, vicar of Pickering from 1814 to 1857, disliked the paintings and insisted they be recovered, much to the frustration of the Archbishop of York at the time, Dr Thomas Musgrave. Ponsonby instructed W. H. Dykes to sketch the discoveries, but he then had the images whitewashed. However, in 1876, a new vicar, the Reverend G. H. Lightfoot, took the decision to remove the whitewash and restore the paintings.

The paintings cover the majority of the nave walls and follow the liturgical calendar in depicting scenes from the lives of the saints, interspersed with more perennial themes such as the life of Christ and the Works of Mercy. The north wall of the nave from west to east (left to right) depicts St George and the Dragon, St Christopher carrying the Child Jesus, the Beheading of John the Baptist surmounted by an image of the Coronation of the Virgin by the Holy Trinity, and the martyrdoms of the popular English patrons St Edmund and St Thomas Becket. On the south wall working east to west (left to right) scenes from the martyrdom of St Catherine of Alexandria, the Seven Corporal Works of Mercy, and the scenes of Christs redemptive work, the Passion, Resurrection, and Harrowing of Hell.

Pickering Wall Paintings (north wall)

View of all the north wall paintings.

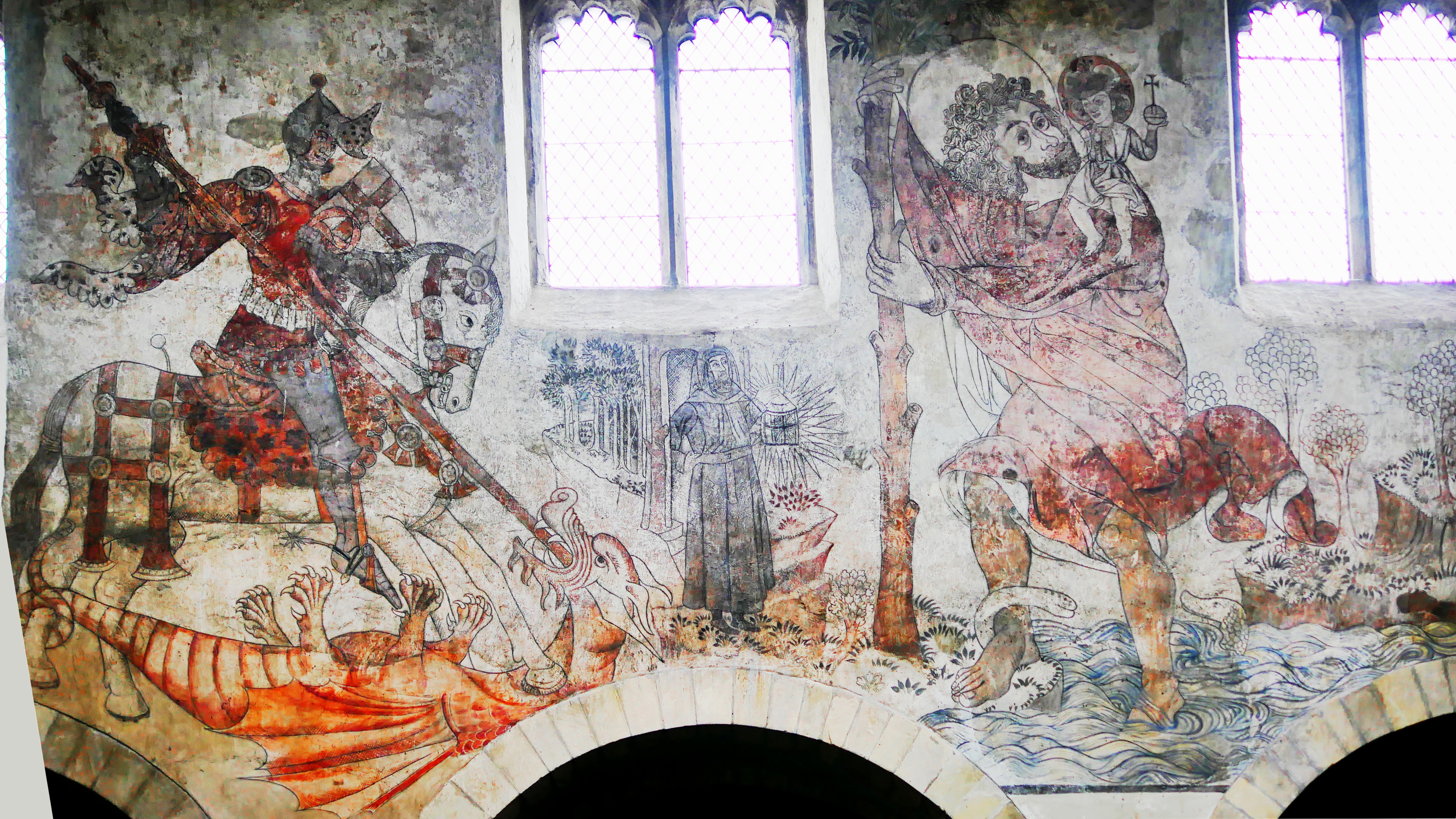
St George and the Dragon and St Christopher carrying the Child Jesus.

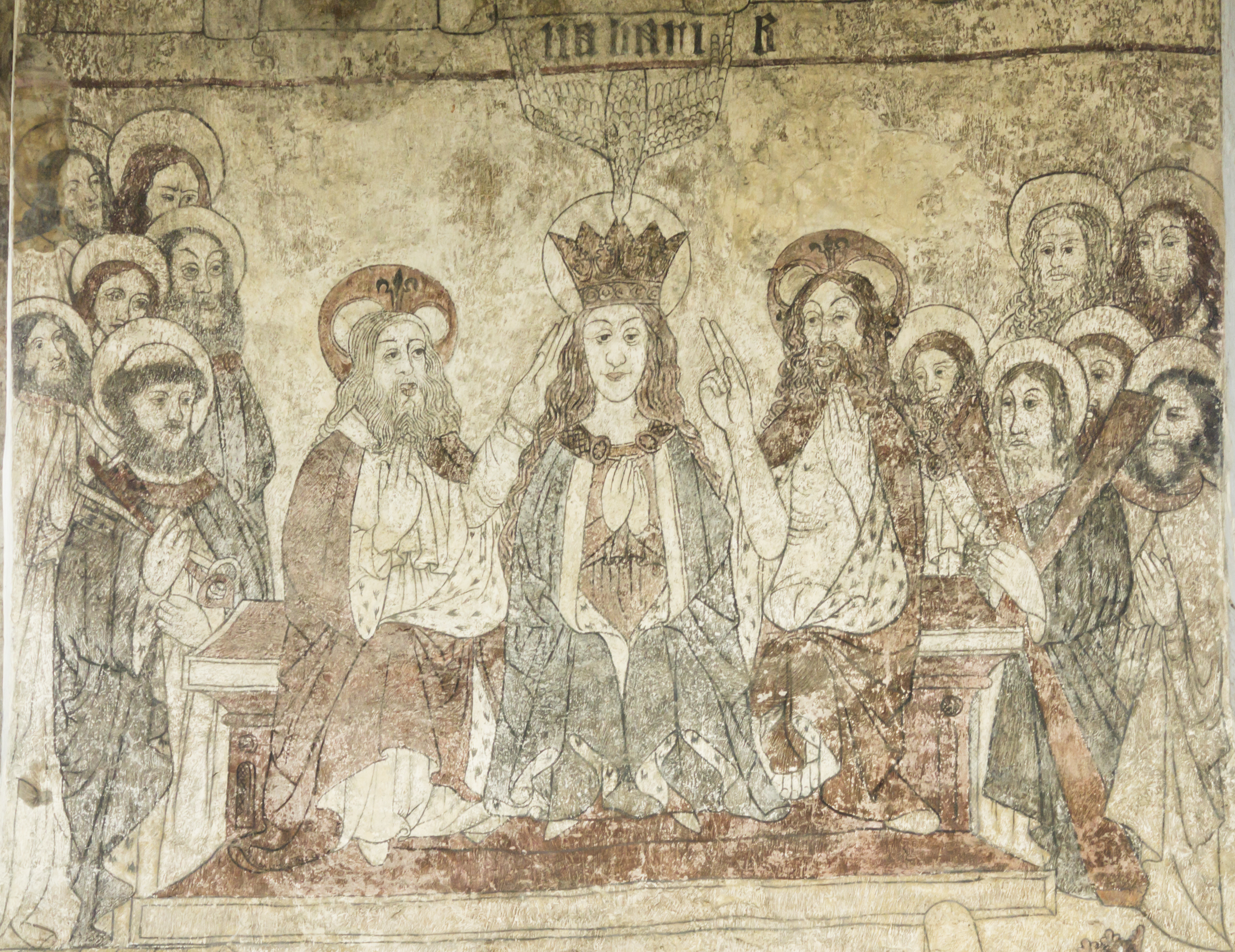
The Coronation of the Virgin by the Holy Trinity in the presence of the martyred Apostles.

The Beheading of St. John the Baptist.

The Beheading of St. John the Baptist and the martyrdom of St. Edmund.

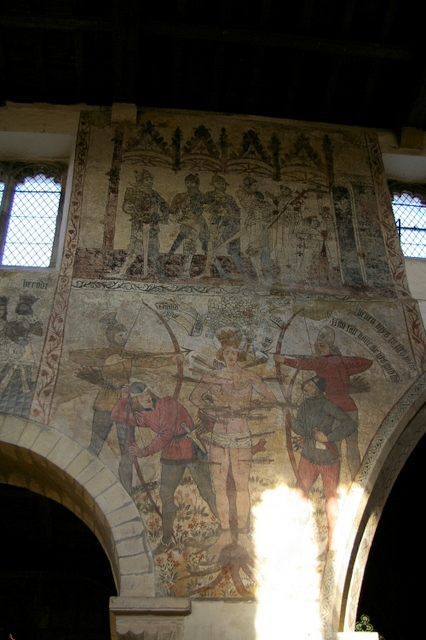
Martyrdoms of Thomas above and Edmund beneath.

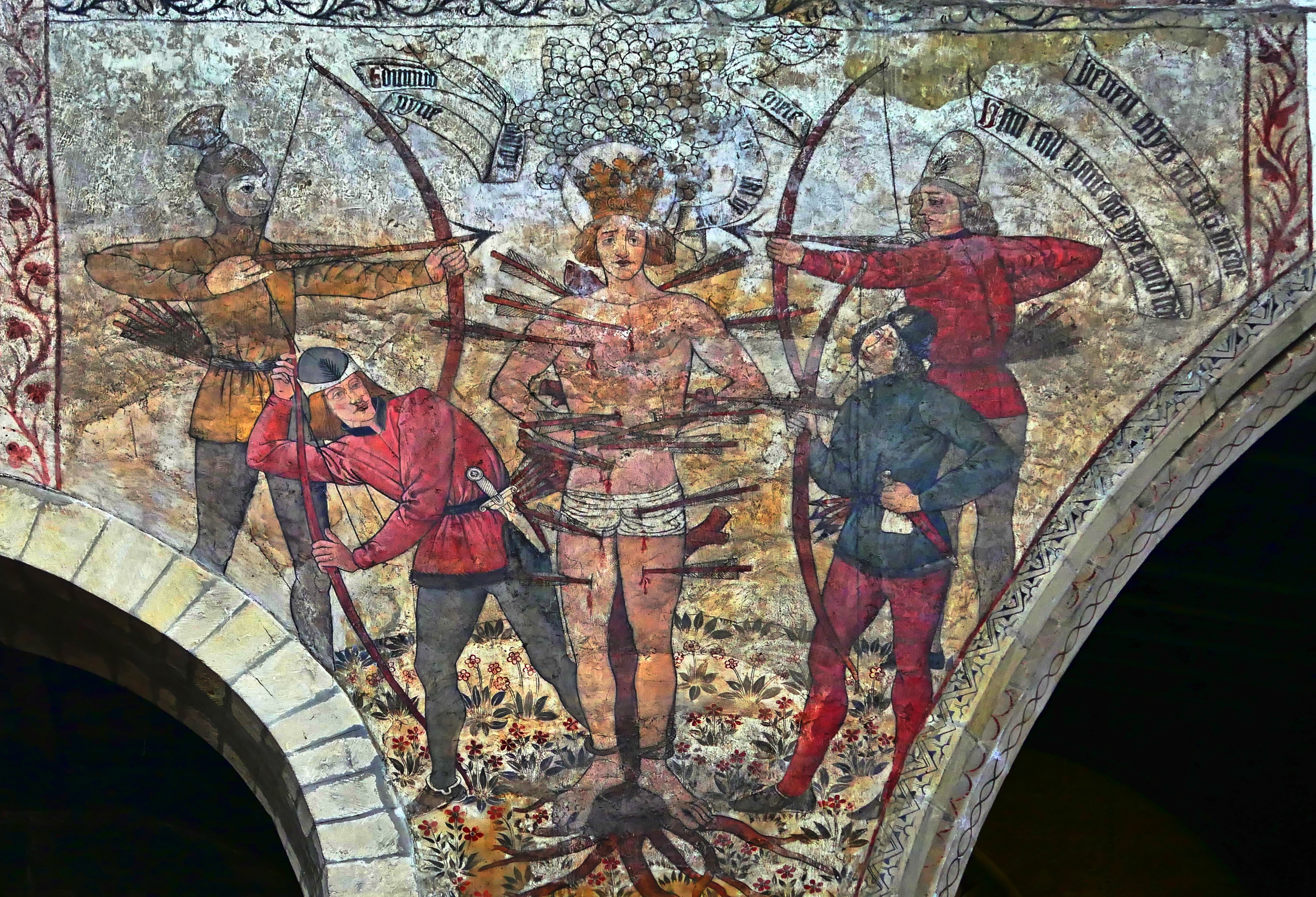
Martyrdom of St Edmund.
Pickering Wall Paintings (south wall)

View of all the south wall paintings.

The Martyrdom of Catherine series.

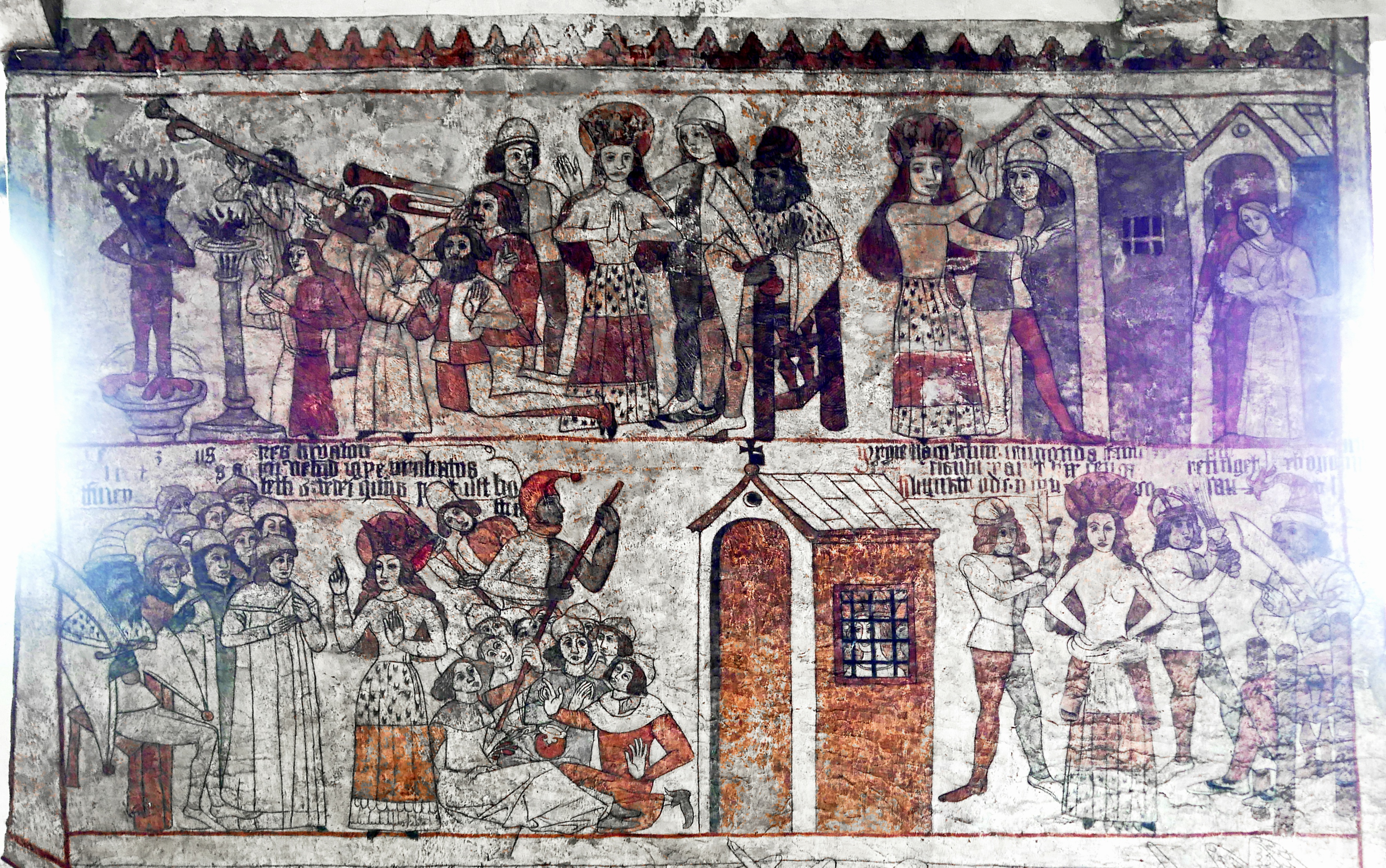
Upper section of the Martyrdom of Catherine series.

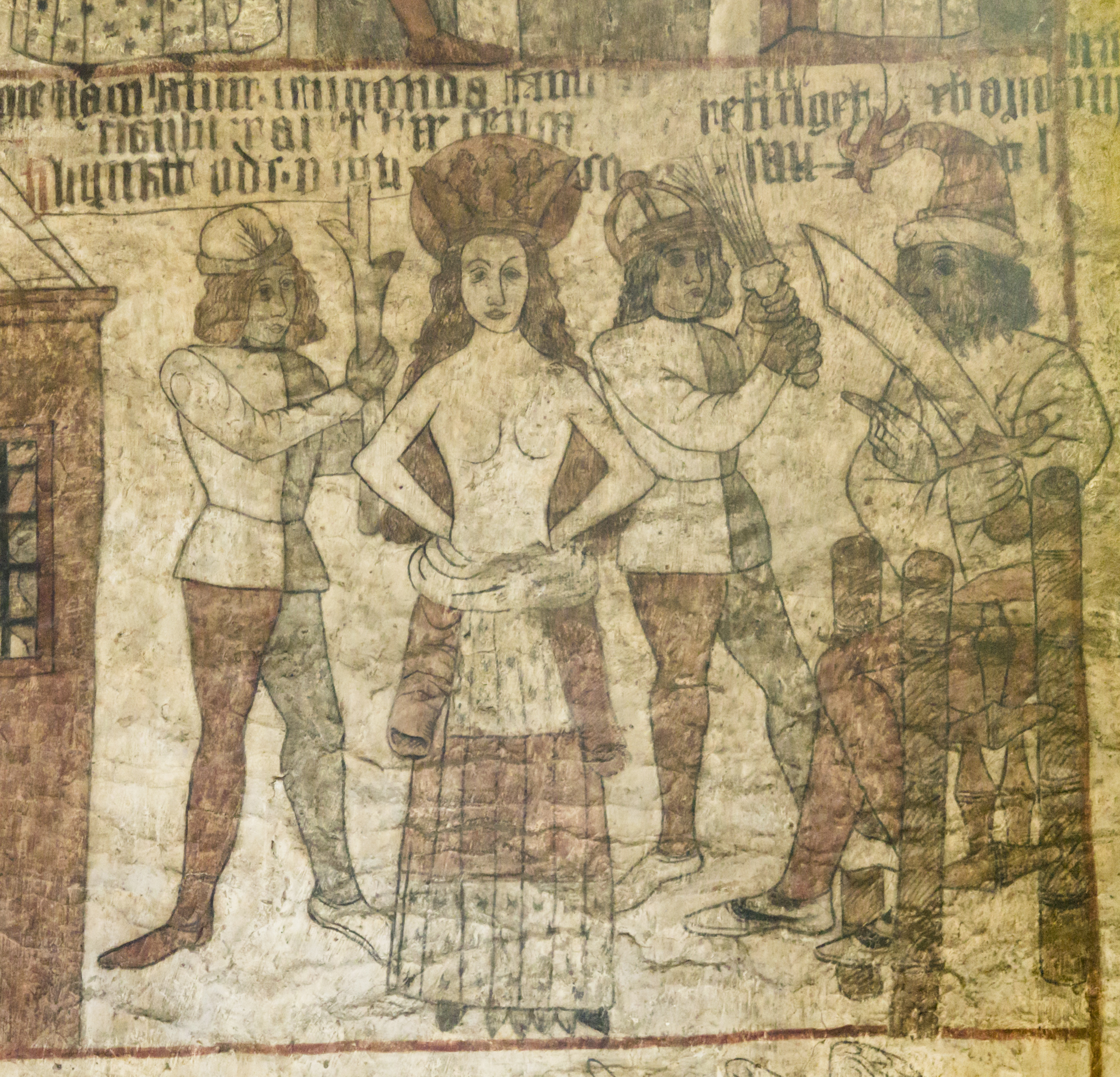
Closeup of the martyr, Catherine of Alexandria

Lower section of the Martyrdom of Catherine series.

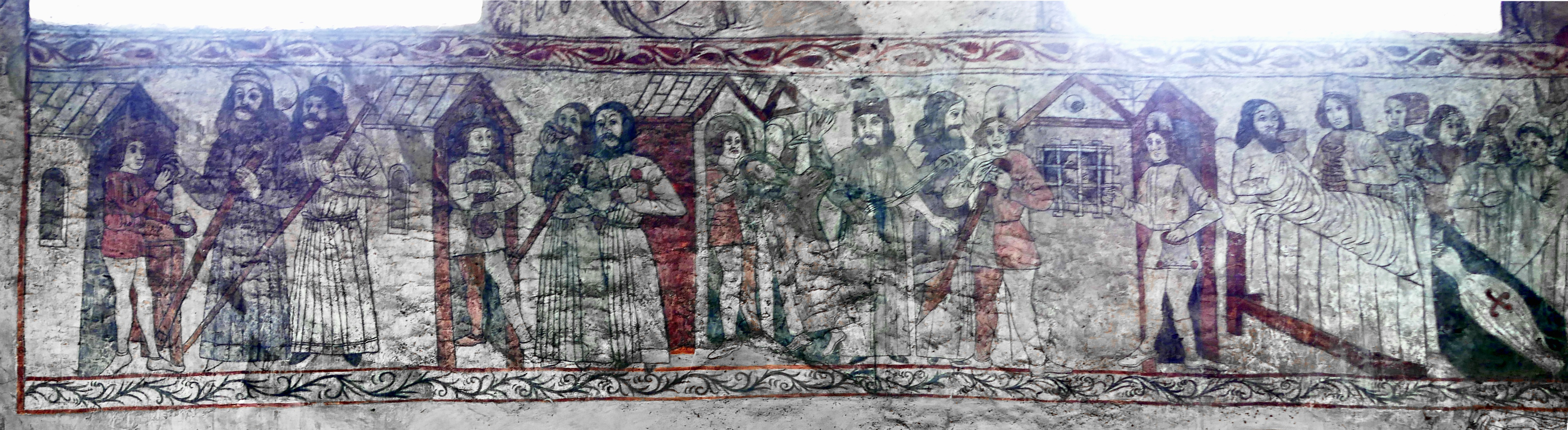
The Corporal Works of Mercy

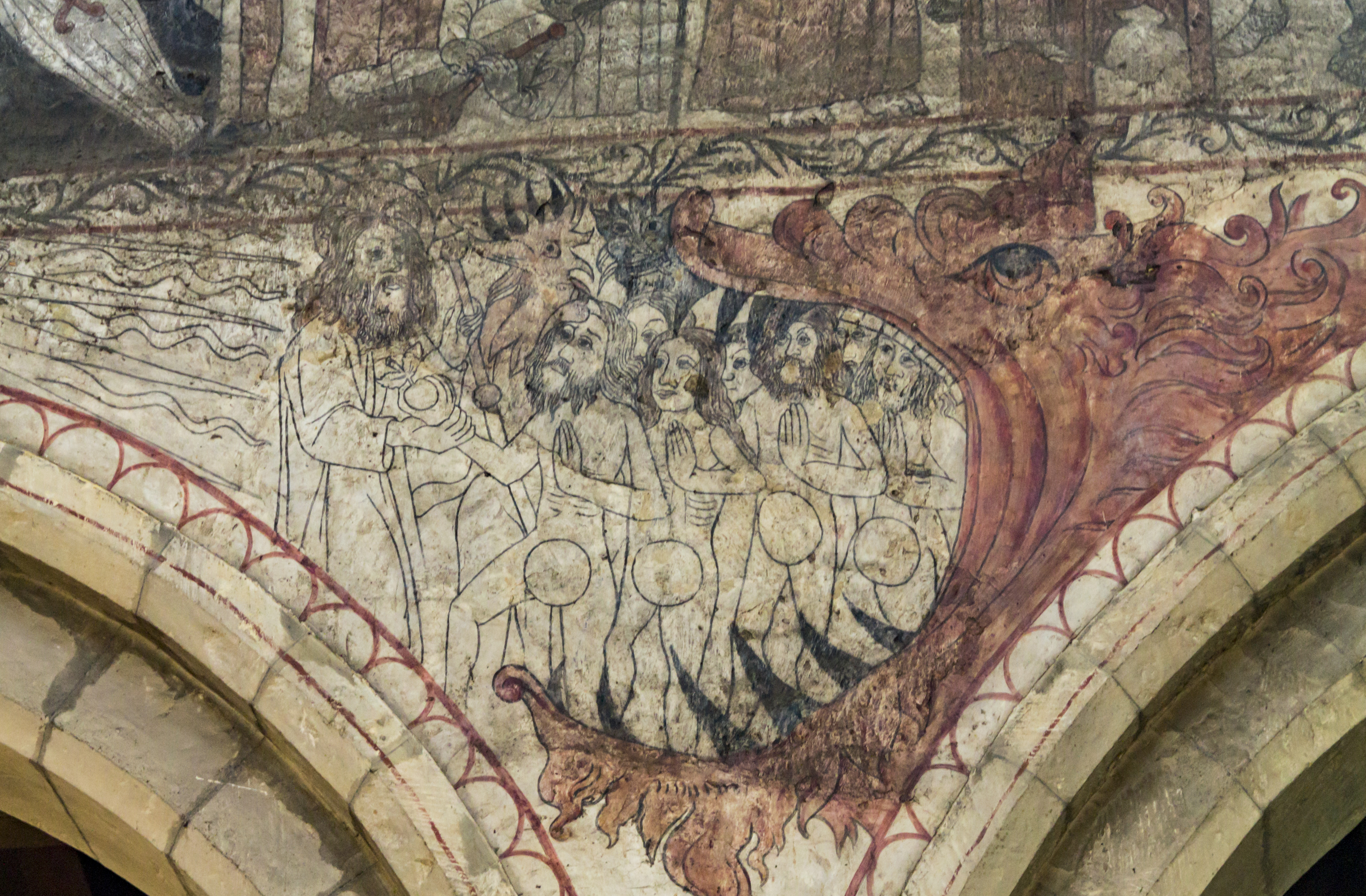
The Harrowing of Hell.

== See also ==
- Grade I listed buildings in North Yorkshire (district)
- Listed buildings in Pickering, North Yorkshire
- Pickering Castle
- The Raunds Wall Paintings
- The Slapton Wall Paintings
