= Pickering Beck =

River in North Yorkshire, England

Pickering Beck The Duchy Water (above Pickering) Newtondale Stream
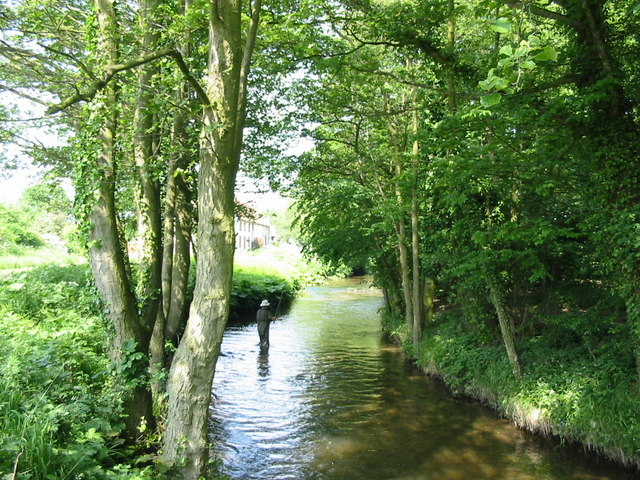
- Fly Fishing in Pickering Beck

Location
- Country: England
- County: North Yorkshire
- Unitary authority: North Yorkshire

Physical characteristics
- Source
  - location: Fen Bog
  - coordinates: 54°21′53.5″N 0°41′58.7″W
  - elevation: 492 ft (150 m)
- Mouth
  - location: Kirby Misperton
  - coordinates: 54°12′28.2″N 0°47′45.5″W
  - elevation: 76 ft (23 m)
- Length: 18.3 mi (29.5 km)
- Basin size: 26.65 mi^{2} (69.0 km^{2})

Basin features
- River system: River Derwent, Yorkshire
- Tributaries
  - left: Havern Beck, Levisham Beck, Crossdale Spring, East Ings Drain, Tofts Drain
  - right: Newtondale Spring, Yaul Sike, Sole Beck, Scarfhill Beck, Raindale Beck, Gundale Beck, Green Raygate Spring, Lendales Drain

Pickering Beck is a river that runs for over 18 miles (29 km) from its source in the North York Moors National Park through the town of Pickering and on to its confluence with Costa Beck at Kirby Misperton. It is a meandering river that is fed by numerous named and unnamed becks and streams which flow over sandstone and limestone beds and an alluvia of sand, clay silt and gravel. The beck is known for flooding and in recent times has been a beneficiary of funding and experimental flood protection schemes.

The beck rises at Fen Bog, a watershed between the Eller Beck to the north and Pickering Beck to the south, where rainfall from the surrounding moorland can flow in either direction. Its source lies about 2.5 miles (4 km) west of the source of the River Derwent, into which the beck ultimately drains via the Costa Beck and River Rye. It forms part of the Derwent catchment.

Both Ryedale District Council and the Environment Agency acknowledge Pickering Beck as being a main river.

== History ==
The valley that Pickering Beck inhabits was carved by glacial melt water before the late Devensian period of history. It was initially thought to be a drainage channel for a glacial lake, either by two ice sheets abutting and the waters reaching the same height as the surrounding ice sheets (about 200 feet (61 m) above sea level), or as a simple drainage channel for the meltwater when the temperatures rose. Either way, the deep meandering channel has been estimated to have been carved by water flowing at 10,000 cubic feet (280 m^{3}) per second (ten times the amount of water discharged by the Thames when it is in flood).

The beck has been subject to flooding (particularly flash flooding in summer) since modern times. This is due to the steep sided valley that the waters run off of and into the beck. Because of the above average flooding suffered by Pickering (and elsewhere) in 2007, the town became a pilot in a government project known as Slowing the Flow.

=== Slowing the Flow scheme ===
With the new scheme, 129 Large Woody Debris (LWD) dams (or Leaky Dams) were installed which will allow slower moving water through, but retain fast headwaters attacking the dam head. Elsewhere, 187 heather bale check dams were constructed on the various smaller streams that feed into Pickering Beck to hold more water back. Additionally, a new floodplain was created to the north east of the town in area near to the hamlet of Newbridge known as Low Hunters Bridge. This floodplain and bund storage allows for 4,200,000 cubic feet (120,000 m^{3}) of floodwater to be retained when the beck is in peak flow or under heavy rain conditions.

The original plan was for two bunds that would store 3,000,000 cubic feet (85,000 m^{3}) of water adjacent to the railway near to Newbridge. Modelling data suggested that a failure of the bunds would endanger public safety and a new scheme was devised that would fall under the Reservoirs Act 1975 making the new bund a Category A reservoir, and a 4,200 cubic feet (120 m^{3}) clay bund was installed across the beck at Low Hunters Bridge. The bund extended to 0.62 miles (1 km) and at a height of 6 feet 7 inches (2 m) above the land level. The outflow channel is subsurface to the beck and floodplain and this allows a maximum of 510 cubic feet (14.5 m^{3}) per second out of the reservoir. This increased the money needed to be spent from £1.15 million to £3.2 million.

Work was started on the scheme in 2014 and the project was officially unveiled by Secretary of State for the Environment Liz Truss in October 2015.

In January 2016, Geoffrey Lean, an environmental journalist, wrote an article for The Independent stating that after significant rainfall, the bund had held the waters away from Pickering and saved the town from flooding, unlike York (a bare 40 miles (64 km) away). This prompted a response from Jeremy Biggs (director of the Freshwater Habitats Trust) who claimed that the catchment for Pickering was the driest place in Yorkshire over the Christmas and New Year Period for 2015 and 2016.

The Meteorological Office data for the area showed a 150% above average rainfall in the area and Mike Potter, a Pickering Councillor, said it was very wet and Pickering was spared. Lean cites Bigg's evidence as skewed, including the fact that he quotes Westerdale weather data as his source. Westerdale is in another catchment area and is 16 miles (26 km) north of Pickering where the waters feed into the River Esk rather than Pickering Beck. The argument also continued in the locality where some have called for a flood wall to be installed in the town.

The Environment Agency released figures in the Spring of 2016 that showed the defences put in place by the Slowing the Flow scheme had reduced the river peak flow by around 15–20%. Rainfall figures were recorded as being 2.0 inches (50 mm) over a 36-hour period in Christmas 2015. However, one of the chairmen of the Slowing the Flow partnership cautioned that the defences would not be enough to prevent flooding on the scale that affected Pickering in 2007, and that an additional 23,000,000 cubic feet (650,000 m^{3}) of floodplain would be needed.

In April 2019, two Eurasian beavers were introduced into Cropton Forest north west of Pickering. The beavers will take part in the slowing the flow scheme and their natural engineering of dams will be assessed over a five-year period.

== Route ==
The beck begins at Fen Bog, just to the west of, but significantly lower than, the A169 road across the North Yorkshire Moors from Pickering to Whitby. It largely drains the southern part of Goathland Moor and the Saltersgate areas through the narrow valley of Newtondale, which it shares with the North Yorkshire Moors Railway. It travels south westwards at first being fed by Thack Sike and numerous smaller watercourses spilling off the moorland before turning south at Carter House/North Dale and follows the same route as the railway in the narrow sided valley.

It splits into two streams by Pifelhead Wood and goes westwards past Newton Dale Halt on the railway before turning south again at Kidstyke Farm and meanders south in varying degrees past Levisham and Farwath before heading west again into Newbridge and south into Pickering town. The beck flows under Bridge Street (a Grade II listed bridge), The Ropery and Hungate in the town centre before it heads mainly in a southerly direction and flowing into the Costa Beck east of Kirby Misperton.

In the majority of the upper reaches (above Pickering), the beck takes a very meandering course through tracts of dense woodland. This is being remedied in some places to allow sunlight onto the beck. The lower reaches of the beck (south of Pickering) flow through a more arable and farmed landscape with crop growing and cattle rearing.

== Hydrology ==
Pickering beck is usually between 3.9 inches (0.1 m) and 3 feet 3 inches (1 m) high in its normal range. The highest level ever recorded in Pickering was on 26 June 2007 when the river level was 6 feet 6 inches (1.98 m) at 1:00 am. The town has been flooded on four occasions between 1999 and 2007 with the 2007 floods being most notable for the level of the flooding with an estimated £7 million worth of damages.

The normal discharge flow from the beck is measured at 29.9 cubic feet (0.848 m^{3}) per second measured from the gauging station at Ings Bridge which is a crump (triangular) weir. This is an average flow and does not represent flooding statistics as the gauging station is set in a floodplain and becomes ineffective when the river is flooded.

== Industrial history ==
The builders of the Whitby and Pickering Railway used the narrow valley at Newtondale as a route for their railway. At Fen Bog, they had to float the railway on timber and sheep fleeces. Between the source of the Beck and Pickering, the beck flows under the railway six times and the railway shadows the beck all the way into Pickering.

The beck was used to power several watermills in the town of Pickering, of which three are still standing; High Mill, Vivers Mill and Low Mill. The weir attached to Low Mill has a 6 ft 7 in (2 m) drop which is still a barrier to fish migration. Low Mill is now a private residence and has a Grade II listing attached to the building. High Mill was adjacent to the first railway station in Pickering and like Low Mill is now a private residence. The Bone Mill was adjacent to the right hand side of the beck by Southgate. It was demolished and a coal depot was used on the land, which became derelict. A supermarket now occupies the site.

Vivers Mill has also been converted into a dwelling and remains Grade II listed. All mills, apart from the Bone Mill, were for corn milling.

A trout farm was established beside the beck in 1971 as the cold, clean water was ideal for raising trout. The business built a lake between the two divided sections of the beck just north of Pickering railway station. Due to the owners retirement and a downturn in business, the lake will be tarmaced over to provide a 158 car park as an overflow for the railway business by the end of 2017.

== Ecology ==
The upper reaches of the beck (above Pickering) are part of an SSSI site and additionally it flows through the North York Moors National Park. Fen Bog is a Special Area of Conservation (SAC).

Siltation prevention was undertaken on the beck in its lower reaches in 2014. The siltation near to Lendales Farm was due to cattle drinking and crossing the beck which allowed erosion to occur. Remediation works were undertaken to create a crossing point for the cattle without polluting the water.

The bedrock of the beck flows mainly over the sandstone and limestone calcareous rocks (of the southern hills of the North York Moors) with loose accumulations of clay, silt, gravel and sand. The very upper reaches (source to Levisham Beck) are sandstone, the Middle portion is Corallian limestone (confluence of Levisham and Pickering Becks to Pickering) and the last section (the mainly agricultural reach south of Pickering) is on Kimmeridge Clay. The beck has wild trout and Grayling and whilst it is maintained and cared for by the Pickering Fisheries Association, there is no supplementary stocking of fish. Dace, chub, pike, minnows and brook lamprey have all been noted in its lower reaches.

== Access ==
Pickering Fishery Association have the rights to fish on almost all of Pickering Beck. Above the town of Pickering, fly fishing is preferred where the beck is described as an infant stream. Below the town, the beck widens and has pools and riffles and is wider with improved accessibility.

Newtondale has many access points, Newton Dale Halt railway station and Fen Bog being notable examples in the very upper reaches of the beck. A 2-mile (3.2 km) stretch of The Tabular Hills Walk runs alongside Levisham Beck (a feeder of Pickering Beck) and crosses Pickering Beck at Farwath.
