= Listed buildings in Lockton =

Lockton is a civil parish in the county of North Yorkshire, England. It contains 23 listed buildings that are recorded in the National Heritage List for England. Of these, one is listed at Grade II*, the middle of the three grades, and the others are at Grade II, the lowest grade. The parish contains the village of Lockton and the surrounding countryside. Most of the listed buildings are houses, cottages and associated structures, farmhouses and farm buildings. The others include a church, a boundary cross, two bridges, a village pound, a well and a telephone kiosk.

== Key ==
Grade	Criteria
II*	Particularly important buildings of more than special interest
II	Buildings of national importance and special interest

== Buildings ==
Name and location	Photograph	Date	Notes	Grade
St Giles' Church; 54.29869°N 0.70590°W		13th century	The church is built in sandstone, the nave and tower have stone-flagged roofs, and the roofs of the chancel and porch are in pantile. The church consists of a nave, a south porch, a north vestry, a chancel and a west tower. The tower has two stages, diagonal buttresses, a two-light west window with a pointed arch, two-light bell openings, an embattled parapet and a saddleback roof.	II*
Malo Cross; 54.34275°N 0.66819°W		c. 1619	A boundary cross in limestone, it is about 1.75 metres (5 ft 9 in) high. The cross has rounded arms, and on the east face is an inscription.	II
Oak Crag; 54.29861°N 0.70977°W	—	Late 17th century	A house and a shop, later combined into a house, in limestone and sandstone, with quoins on the left, and a roof of pantile and slate with a coped gable and a shaped kneeler on the left. There are two storeys and three bays, and a rear outshut with a catslide roof. On the front is a bracketed porch, to its left are two canted bay windows, and the other windows have pivoting lights.	II
Box Tree Farmhouse and Cottage; 54.29855°N 0.70753°W	—	Early 18th century	The cottage, and the later farmhouse to the left, are in sandstone, and have pantile roofs with coped gables and shaped kneelers. They have two storeys, the house has three bays, and the lower cottage has one bay. In the centre of the house is a gabled porch with bargeboards, and the windows are sashes with lintels and triple keystones. In the cottage is a doorway and horizontally-sliding sash windows.	II
Eller Beck Bridge; 54.37313°N 0.68059°W		Early to mid 18th century	The bridge, which was widened in 1803 by John Carr, carries the A169 road over Eller Beck. It is in sandstone, and consists of a single semicircular arch with voussoirs. On the upstream side is a narrow band and a plain parapet. The downstream side has pilaster buttresses rising to form low piers in the parapet. The parapet has cambered coping, and the piers have chamfered caps.	II
Cherry Tree Farmhouse; 54.29816°N 0.70332°W	—	Mid 18th century	The farmhouse is in sandstone, with a stepped eaves course, and a pantile roof with coped gables and shaped kneelers. The high end has two storeys and two bays, the low end to the right has one storey and an attic, and at the rear is a continuous outshut. In the high end are sash windows with lintels and keystones. The low end contains a doorway, a sash window, and two small pivoting windows. At the rear are horizontally-sliding sashes.	II
Kingthorpe House and railings 54.26046°N 0.72070°W	—	Mid 18th century	The house is in sandstone on a plinth, partly rendered, with a timber eaves cornice, a slate roof, and a double depth plan. The entrance front has a range of two storeys and three bays, projecting gabled wings with two storeys and attics and three bays, further single-storey wings, and a rear service wing. The central doorway has pilaster jambs, a divided fanlight, and a corbelled open pediment. Most of the windows are sashes, in the upper floor are round-arched windows in architraves, and in the wings are lunettes. The garden front has two storeys and three bays, and a central doorway with attached Doric columns, a patterned radial fanlight, and an open pediment. Leading to the doorway are steps with iron railings. Above the doorway is a round-arched window, and flanking it are full-height bow windows.	II
Garden wall to rear of Kingthorpe House; 54.26021°N 0.72031°W	—	18th century	The wall encloses the garden to the east and south. It is in grey sandstone, partly faced in red brick, and has pantile coping.	II
Gate piers and wall northeast of Kingthorpe House; 54.26066°N 0.72021°W	—	Mid 18th century	The wall is in limestone on a plinth, with pantile coping. It curves to the left, it is about 2 metres (6 ft 7 in) high, and is ramped up to the gate piers. To the right is a mounting block. The gate piers are in sandstone, about 2.5 metres (8 ft 2 in) high, with a square plan and alternate courses raised. Each pier has a moulded cornice, and a flat, stepped cap.	II
Low Staindale; 54.30184°N 0.66477°W		Mid 18th century	The house has been extended, the front of the original part is in limestone with quoins, and the extension and the rear are in sandstone. The original part has two storeys and two bays, and the extension has one storey and one bay. In the middle of the original part is a doorway, and the windows are sashes, those in the upper floor horizontally-sliding. At the rear is a doorway with an incised keystone.	II
Opicana; 54.29862°N 0.70698°W	—	Mid 18th century	The house is in limestone and has a pantile roof with coped gables. There are two storeys, three bays, and a continuous rear outshut. On the front is a doorway, and the windows are horizontally-sliding sashes.	II
Village pound 54.29853°N 0.70815°W	—	18th century	The village pound is a rectangular enclosure, with one wall formed by a farm building. The other walls are in limestone with gabled coping, and are about 1 metre (3 ft 3 in) high. At the left corner is an iron gate and stone gate posts.	II
Farm building west of Box Tree Farmhouse; 54.29853°N 0.70788°W	—	Late 18th century	A range of cattle sheds with a pantile roof, a single storey and four bays. On the front are three stable doors, a board door and two small windows, and in the right gable wall is a pitching door.	II
Grange Farmhouse; 54.29841°N 0.70631°W	—	Late 18th century	The farmhouse is in limestone, and has a pantile roof with a coped gable on the left. There are two storeys and three bays. On the front are two doorways, and the windows are sashes.	II
Ivy Cottage; 54.29840°N 0.70654°W	—	Late 18th century	The house was later extended, the earlier part is in limestone, the later part is in sandstone and it has a pantile roof. There are two storeys, an original part of two bays, an extension of one bay, and a rear wing. Steps lead to a doorway in the centre of the original part, the windows are sashes, and the ground floor openings have keystones. In the extension is an elliptical-arched carriage entrance and a casement window above.	II
Manor Farmhouse; 54.29886°N 0.70424°W		Late 18th century	The farmhouse is in sandstone, and has a pantile roof with coped gables, and a plain kneeler on the left. There are two storeys and three bays. In the front is a doorway and sash windows; all the openings have lintels with incised keystones.	II
Mount Cottage, wall, steps and workshop 54.29772°N 0.70295°W	—	Late 18th century	The house and former workshop are in limestone, partly rendered, and have pantile roofs with coped gables and plain kneelers. The house has two storeys, two bays, and a continuous rear outshut, and the former workshop is lower, with two storeys and two bays. A ramped staircase with a retaining wall in limestone with milled coping leads up to the central doorway in the house. The house and workshop have doorways with fanlights, the windows in the house are sashes, and in the workhouse there are fixed lights.	II
Blacksmith's Cottage, Holmlea and The Haven; 54.29838°N 0.70701°W	—	Early 19th century	A row of three cottages and a building to the left in sandstone with a pantile roof. The cottages have two storeys and five bays, and the other building has one storey and an attic. The cottages have doorways and sash windows, and in the other building are casement windows, one in a half-dormer.	II
Bridge over a tributary of the Eller Beck; 54.37256°N 0.68132°W	—	Early 19th century	The bridge carries the A169 road over a stream. It is in sandstone and consists of a single segmental arch of voussoirs. The bridge has buttresses that rise to form piers, and low parapets with rough coping stones.	II
Greystone House and Greystones Cottage; 54.29846°N 0.70439°W	—	Early 19th century	The house and cottage are in sandstone, partly rendered, with a pantile roof. There are two storeys, the house has two bays, and the cottage to the right has a single bay and a rear extension. The house and cottage each have a doorway, the windows in the house are sashes, and in the cottage they are latticed with three lights.	II
Village well 54.29840°N 0.70665°W	—	Early 19th century	The well is in a square enclosure, with Ivy Cottage to the east, a garage to the west, and a limestone wall to the south. On the north side are cast iron railings on a stone plinth and a gate. Inset in the east wall is an inscription.	II
West View Farmhouse, wall and railings 54.29829°N 0.70359°W	—	Early to mid 19th century	A farmhouse with a former outbuilding incorporated into the house, it is in sandstone and has a pantile roof with coped gables and shaped kneelers. The main house has two storeys and three bays, and the former outbuilding is lower, with two storeys and one bay. The central doorway has a fanlight, most of the windows are sashes, and there is one casement window in the outbuilding. In front of the house are cast iron fleur-de-lys railings with vase finials on a low stone wall.	II
Telephone kiosk 54.29837°N 0.70719°W	—	1935	The K6 type telephone kiosk in Main Street was designed by Giles Gilbert Scott. Constructed in cast iron with a square plan and a dome, it has three unperforated crowns in the top panels.	II
