= Newton Dale =

Narrow north/south valley in North Yorkshire, England

Coordinates: 54°21′17″N 0°42′38″W

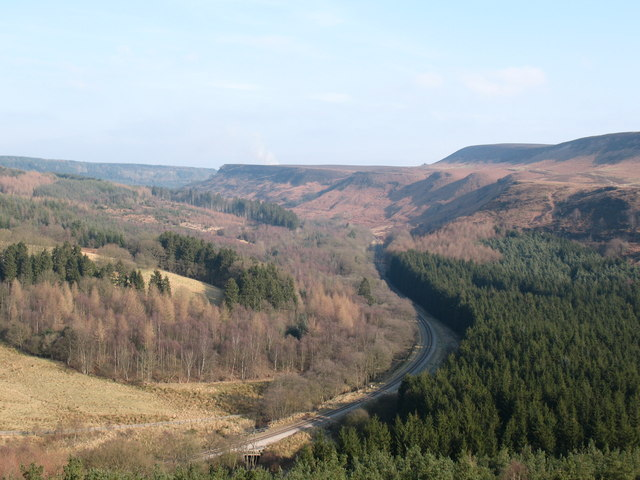
Newtondale looking northeastwards

Newton Dale, or Newtondale, is a narrow dale within the North York Moors National Park in North Yorkshire, England. It was created by meltwater from a glacier carving the narrow valley. Water still flows through the dale and is known as Pickering Beck.

The dale starts between Goathland Moor and Lockton High Moor where water runs southwards towards Pickering. In its upper reaches, the dale is very twisting and deep with the floor of the dale being 490 feet (150 m) above sea level.

== History ==
The dale was carved out by a massive amount of water charging through it in the last ice age. At the start of the twentieth century, Percy Kendall suggested that several massive glacial lakes at what is now the watershed between Eller Beck, the River Derwent and Pickering Beck effectively dammed the water, and it was released at a torrent to carve the dale. It has been estimated that a few decades worth of water running through the dale carved it out, spilling the displaced earth into Lake Pickering. The flow of water is believed to have been 10,000 cubic metres (350,000 cu ft) per second; ten times the amount of water discharged by the River Thames when it is in flood. Kendall's original theory about massive pre-glacial lakes has been cast in doubt by modern research; many now believe that the ice sheets themselves just melted and released the water, rather than the ice sheets holding back water in huge lakes. However, everyone agrees that the dale is an oddity, as the water flowing through Pickering Beck down the dale does not have the power needed to carve out the narrow valley, which is 490 feet (150 m) above sea level on the valley floor, with steep walls at up to 790 feet (240 m) at the crest. At certain points, the narrow valley is only 1,600 feet (500 m) across.

Killing Nab Scar, a cliff face in the wood just to the north of Newton Dale railway station, was formerly a place where the farmers of Goathland were, according to the terms of their tenancy, obliged to breed, raise and train hawks for royal use.

The upper part of the dale was largely untouched by humans until the 1830s, when the Whitby to Pickering Railway was built through it. However, the road between Pickering and Whitby used to go through Farwath and Levisham before it was diverted further east (now the A169). The railway builders used bundles of wood, sheep fleeces and spoil to float the railway across Fen Bog.

At the head of the dale, where water either goes to Eller Beck (and then the Murk Esk then the River Esk) or Pickering Beck, is a bog (Fen Bog) which is managed by the Yorkshire Wildlife Trust. The bog is 59 feet (18 m) deep in places and is a Special Area of Conservation on account of the grasses and butterflies which are resident there. The area was gifted to the Yorkshire Wildlife Trust in 1964 in memory of two servicemen killed in the Second World War. The Lyke Wake Walk also crosses the bog.

The dale was designated as a Site of Special Scientific Interest in 1955 due to the varied plant and wildlife that it supports across wetland, woodland and bogland. Its glacial history is also a feature in the designation.

In 2015, a flood reservoir and over 160 leaky dams were built in the dale's lower reaches after Pickering was flooded four times between 1999 and 2007. The last flood caused £7 million worth of damage to the town.

== Transport ==
There is no road access into the dale in its upper reaches, only parking at the fringes and walking in. The North York Moors Railway have two stations in the dale; Levisham and Newton Dale Halt.

Up until 2011, there was a forest drive road between the villages of Levisham and Stape, but the Forestry Commission closed the route because of landslips, prohibitive repair costs and to preserve the ecology of the dale due to its SSSI status.

Newtondale Horse Trail is a 37-mile (60 km) long distance walker's route that utilises bridleways and paths through the dale between Grosmont and Pickering.
