= A169 road =

Road in North Yorkshire, England

Coordinates: 54.4138°N 0.6849°W

A169

Route information
- Length: 23.6 mi (38.0 km)

Major junctions
- South end: Malton
- A64 A170 A171
- North end: Whitby

Location
- Country: United Kingdom

Road network
- Roads in the United Kingdom; Motorways; A and B road zones
← A168	→ A170

The A169 is an A road in North Yorkshire, England. It runs from the A64 at Malton on the edge of the Yorkshire Wolds through the Vale of Pickering and across the North York Moors to join the A171 just west of Whitby. It is a single carriageway for all of its 25-mile (40 km) route. Whilst it is not considered a Primary Route nationally, the Ryedale Local Transport Plan lists it as part of its Major Road Network alongside the A64, A166 and A171.

The moorland section between Pickering and the junction with the A171 can be problematic to travellers during winter when frost, dense fog and heavy snow are common occurrences.

== Route ==
The B1257 connects Malton town centre with the A64. Once the B1257 reaches the A64 it becomes the A169 road to Whitby. On the north west of this junction is Eden Camp. The route then goes in a mainly northerly direction through the Vale of Pickering and crossing the confluence of the River Rye and the Costa Beck before reaching Pickering town centre and intersecting with the A170.

The route then goes north east, across the green countryside on the edge of the Dalby Forest. It enters the North York Moors National Park 1.2 miles (2 km) out of Pickering near Little Park Wood. 8 miles (13 km) out of Pickering there is a car park with views of the Hole of Horcum. Immediately after this there is a sharp 90° turn to the west followed by a sharp 180° downhill turn to the east before you pass the former site of the Saltersgate Inn and reach the purple moorland landscape.

1.9 miles (3 km) after the Hole of Horcum is the turning for RAF Fylingdales and another sharp bend in the road over Eller Beck Bridge. This is where the Lyke Wake Walk route crosses the A169. This one bends east first then west and is not as severe as that approaching Saltersgate. Here you pass the first turn for Goathland as the route strikes out across Widow Howe Moor and Low Moor. There are some places to stop along the moorland route and it is popular with walkers. After this there is a descent and ascent over Brocka Beck Bridge before the second turn for Goathland. At the junction is Sleights Moor is the first turn for Grosmont and then another viewpoint which looks north east across to Larpool Viaduct and Whitby.

From here downhill is the steep 1 in 5 (20% gradient) of Blue Bank which has an escape route on the northbound side as you go downhill and high friction surface tarmac to aid in braking. At the bottom of Blue Bank is another the turn for Grosmontand the route is mostly downhill from here with some gentle gradients and some steeper as you descend into the village of Sleights. At the bottom of the valley you cross the Esk Valley railway line and the River Esk on Sleights Bridge. This bridge was built in 1937 to replace a bridge that was swept away in the flood of 1930.

Immediately after the bridge is the east turn for the B1410 into Ruswarp, then it is up out of the valley on a much gentler climb until the road reaches a roundabout junction with the A171. Eastwards it is 3 miles (5 km) into Whitby town centre and westwards it is 29 miles (47 km) to Middlesbrough.

== History ==
Acts of Parliament for the building of a Turnpike between Whitby and Pickering were granted in 1784, 1785 and 1827. The original turnpike road south from Whitby deviated at the Fox and Rabbit Inn (at Crossdale Head) and headed south through to Thornton Dale. This road still exists as a minor route. The route south from Saltersgate was tarred in the 1920s (previously having been laid with limestone), with the whole route between Pickering and Whitby being tarred by the 1930s.

On 21 July 1929, three buses carrying members of the Hull British Legion were descending Blue Bank towards Whitby, when the second bus's brakes failed and it careered off the road at the bottom of the bank. Three people died at the scene, with three more dying of their injuries some time later. At the point of the crash, the bus wrecked several beehives and the rescue effort was hampered by angry bees.

After extensive flooding of the River Derwent and Pickering Beck in the year 2000, the A169 between Malton and Pickering was raised to elevate it above the water levels in future possible flooding.

== Conservation ==
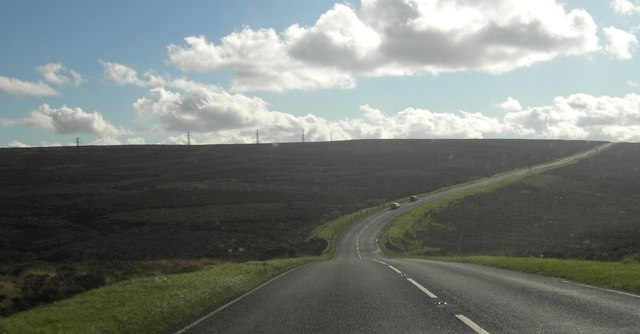
The view south from Goathland Moor as the road goes downhill and curves south west over Brocka Beck Bridge. The pylons are visible against the skyline.

The route passes through two SSSIs when north of Pickering: Hole of Horcum and Newtondale. According to the Landscape Conservation Action Plan, the scenery and view alongside the moorland section of the A169 has been blighted by the pylons that run alongside the road and across the moor. In 2015, Northern Powergrid started remedial works to remove the pylons and associated electrical equipment and replace them with a sub-surface cable power network.

== Safety ==
North Yorkshire Police have mobile speed cameras placed on the road at random times. These cameras have been recording in positions where people have been killed or seriously injured and at designated motorcycle incident points (the route is recognised as being 'used by motorcycles that has a high incidence of collisions and anti social behaviour.' Serious offenders summonsed to court were as follows; 20 in 2013, 11 in 2014 and 8 up to August 2015.

== Public transport ==
Buses operate on the A169 between Malton and Whitby. The Yorkshire Coastliner service 840, which runs from Leeds and York to Malton via the A64, provides an hourly service from Malton to Pickering with four services a day going on to Whitby. The whole route of the Coastliner service was voted Britain's most scenic bus route in an online poll in 2018, with particular mention being made of the section between Pickering and Whitby.
