= Saltersgate Inn =

Former pub in North Yorkshire, England (1648–2018)

- The pub in 2007
- Former names: Waggon & Horses
- Alternative names: Legendary Saltersgate Inn

General information
- Status: Demolished
- Location: Lockton High Moor, England
- Coordinates: 54.3376°N 0.6916°W
- Ordnance Survey: SE851943
- Elevation: 220 metres (720 ft)
- Estimated completion: c. 1648; 378 years ago
- Closed: 2007
- Demolished: 2018; 8 years ago

The Saltersgate Inn (also known as the Legendary Saltersgate Inn) is a former public house at Lockton High Moor on the A169 road between Pickering and Whitby in North Yorkshire, England. The pub was notable for having a fire that was never allowed to burn out, as a legend stated that if it did, the devil would spring forth from the flames. The structure was built around 1648 and converted into a pub in the 18th century; it closed in 2007 and the building was demolished in 2018.

== History ==
The public house is 8 miles (13 km) north of Pickering and 12 miles (19 km) south of Whitby on Lockton High Moor at an elevation of 233 metres (764 ft) above sea level, though the ridge of Whinny Nab to the east of the pub rises to 296 metres (971 ft) and is composed of calcareous grit. It lies on a sharp bend known as the Devil's Elbow on the A169 road between Pickering and Whitby. The old track that passes by was known as Saltergate from which the pub takes its name. Saltergate was first recorded in 1292 in documents about Pickering's royal forest, and a record from 1335 states that the name derives from Old English saltere (a salter) and gata meaning gate. The name of the route is thought to derive from the salt carried on the route, possibly from Cleveland southwards. The name varies between Saltergate and Saltersgate; old Ordnance Survey maps and documents state the spelling is Saltergate.

The structure itself was originally a cottage or farmhouse built in 1648 (some sources state 1627) and was converted into an inn in the 1700s under the name of the Wagon and Horses. (Note: It is not recorded when the pub changed its name to the Saltersgate Inn but Walker makes a reference to the pub having a photograph in the bar of the building when it was called the Wagon & Horses. Some references claim the name change occurs during the Second World War; however, Gordon Home's book printed in 1904 refers to the pub as Saltersgate Inn. An Ordnance Survey map from 1946 shows the site as the Wagon & Horses.) It was at a strategic point on the road south from Whitby where stagecoaches could change over horses. The stabling area was opposite the pub and had a capacity to cater for up to 16 horses. The story of the remote cottage being converted into an inn is supposedly down to a man called Thomas Massenger who was employed to drive the Earl of Mulgrave from Pickering to the earl's country seat near Whitby. Massenger pointed out to the earl that the journey would be quicker if they could change the horses halfway so the earl either loaned or gave Massenger £100 to build stables there. By 1788 there was a twice-weekly cart service which passed the Saltersgate Inn, though by 1795 this had been supplanted by a thrice-weekly mail service.

Fishermen from the coast are thought to have transported their catches further inland to Saltersgate along a path over Fylingdales Moor called the Old Salt Road where salt was also smuggled to for the preservation of the fish. However, a tax of ten shillings per bushel of salt (the equivalent of a month's wages for a ploughand) meant that excise men were on the lookout for those who were smuggling salt. Fishermen trekking over the moorland would look for a light shining in a tiny window of the south-facing wall; if no light was showing then the pub's occupants thought no excise men were about in the area, and it was safe for the smugglers to come to the pub. However, one night, unknown to staff at the pub, an excise man was said to have been waiting in the dark and surprised some smugglers, who in the ensuing fight, killed the government man, and then buried his body beneath the fireplace. They then spread a story that the devil came into the pub, and they trapped him in the flames, thereby making sure the fire would not go out (or else the devil would be released) and then no-one would discover the excise man's body. The fire is alleged to have burned continuously between 1796 and 2007, but in 1977, the fire did go out several times due to a peat shortage. Another version of the story is that a vicar was called in to perform an exorcism on a ghost but succeeded in only banishing the spirit to the fire. What is known is that a new fireplace made by Dobsons of Pickering was installed in the pub in 1800. The legend of the ever-burning fire was to inspire the same legend in the Aidensfield Arms pub set in the TV series Heartbeat.

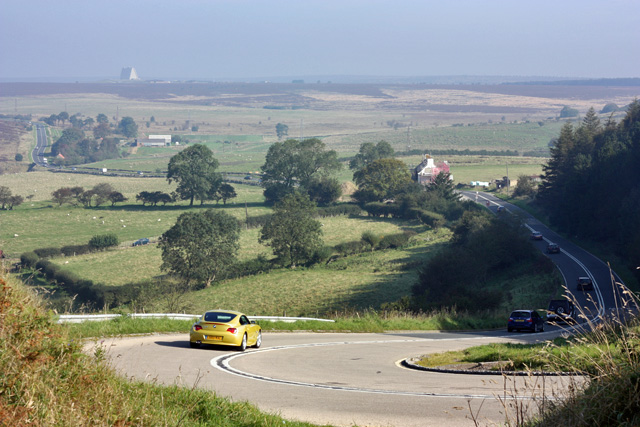
The Devil's Elbow, Saltersgate Inn middle right, and RAF Fylingdales in the distance

The pub was rectangular, brick-faced, and for a long time up until its closure, it was painted in white. The position of the pub on a moorland route meant that the trade was good in the summer, but "barely ticking over" in the winter. During the 1970s and 1980s, most of the trade in winter came in the form of protesters from the peace camp outside RAF Fylingdales. In the 1990s, a ban on peat-cutting on the moors came into effect, and the landlord had to resort to using briquettes which was costing £150 per month to feed the fire. The landlord appealed for help in financing the permanent fire.

The Tabular Hills Walk passes just to the south of the pub along Gallows Dike, and the pub was also on a secondary route of the Cleveland Way known as the Missing Link.

The later pub signs advertised the pub as The Legendary Saltersgate Inn, however it closed in 2007 and was derelict for many years before being demolished in 2018, though it was not confirmed by the demolition team if there were any bones underneath the fireplace. There is still a bus stop outside the old pub listed as Saltersgate Inn which has a service of four buses per day delivered by the Coastliner service.
