= Church of St Mary, Levisham =

Redundant church in North Yorkshire, England

Church of St Mary
- Church of St Mary the Virgin
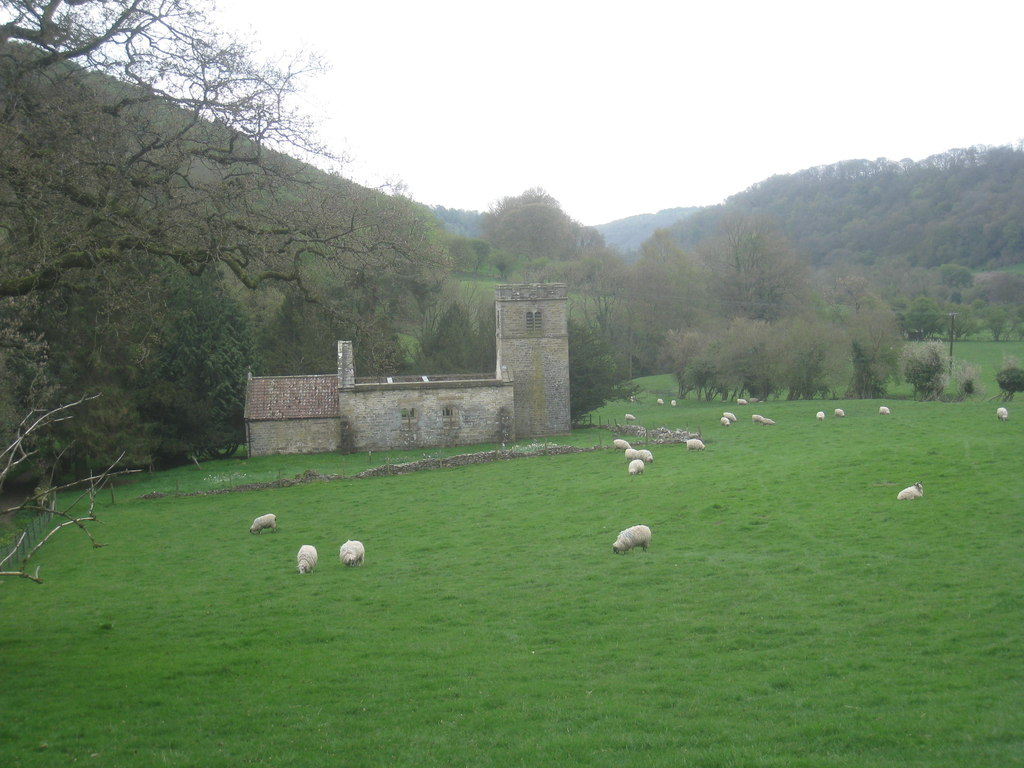
- St. Mary's Levisham
- Church of St Mary
- 54.2991°N 0.7224°W
- OS grid reference: SE 83242 90030
- Location: Levisham, North Yorkshire
- Country: England
- Denomination: Church of England

History
- Status: Closed

Architecture
- Functional status: Redundant
- Closed: c. 1950s

The Church of St Mary, is a redundant Anglican church near the village of Levisham, in North Yorkshire, England. The church stopped hosting regular services in the 1950s and was declared redundant in 1976, although the graveyard has been used for burials since this time. It is thought that the church was in the original village of Levisham, which was abandoned when the Black Death arrived in the fourteenth century. It has been replaced as the parish church by the Church of St John the Baptist, which is located within the village of Levisham.

== History ==
Although the main fabric of the church dates to the eleventh century, the old church possesses a Saxon arch in the chancel, and parts of the walls contain Saxon decorated stonework. The number of Anglo-Saxon stone sculptures located at St Mary's during renovations and archaeological excavations was five; one from the 9th-10th century, and four from the 10th century. One of the Anglo-Saxon stones was built into the tower in 1897. The nature of the stones at Levisham, and those of St Hilda at Ellerburn, demonstrate the easternmost reaches of Anglo-Scandinavian influence in the Ryedale district of North Yorkshire. The next early pre-Conquest churches are at Hackness, and also two mentioned in the Domesday Book as having churches; Seamer and Brompton.

The church is aisleless, with the chancel being 21 feet 6 inches (6.55 m) long by 11 feet (3.4 m) wide, and the nave is 33 feet (10 m) by 18 feet (5.5 m). Archaeological investigations have determined that the medieval nave was 7.9 inches (20 cm) shorter in its width, and the site was probably used as a place of Anglo-Saxon worship, and includes graves from the tenth century. The renovation of the early 19th century remodelled the entire church - only the chancel arch was left untouched from the original structure. At the time of the listed building survey in the early 1950s, the roof of the nave had stone flags, and the vestry and chancel were finished with pantiles.

Despite being renovated between 1802 and 1804 when it was largely rebuilt at a cost of £230 (equivalent to £20,000 in 2025), it was renovated again in 1884. The church became redundant when the Church of St John the Baptist was rebuilt in Levisham village, which was closer for the parishioners to walk to. Pevsner describes the church as being "forlorn at the bottom by Levisham Beck..." The church is located between the villages of Levisham and Lockton, and its isolation from both is said to be its abandonment during the 14th century due to the area being infected with the Black Death. Even so, archaeological studies of the area have found no evidence of a village surrounding the church, with some believing the position of the church was deliberate as it lay alongside the old road from Pickering to Whitby. However, another suggestion is that as St Mary's lies to the south of the village of Levisham, it was possibly built to serve both the Levisham and Lockton communities. The local legend relating to the church's position below the village is that every night, the devil carried all the building materials down into the valley. The west tower was added in 1897, 13 years after the renovations, in honour of Queen Victoria's Diamond Jubilee. In the 19th century, the church was in the Deanery of Malton, the Archdeaconry of Cleveland, and the Diocese of York. The current church in Levisham village (St John the Baptist) and is mostly under the same episcopal authority apart from the it is in the Deanery of Northern Ryedale.

The church was last used for worship in the 1950s, though one outside service is held at the site annually, and some interments continued as it remains the official burial ground of the parish. The church was recorded as a grade II* listed building with Historic England in 1953, and was declared redundant in 1976. The newer church in Levisham village, St John the Baptist, which was previously a chapel-of-ease to St Mary's, was rebuilt in 1884 at a cost of £300 (equivalent to £32,000 in 2025), and became the parish church when St Mary's was declared redundant. A stone carving of a dragon, known as the Ryedale Dragon, has been moved from St Mary's to the newer church in the village, as too has the Norman font.

== See also ==
- Grade II* listed churches in North Yorkshire (district)
- Listed buildings in Levisham
