= Ness, North Yorkshire =

Village in North Yorkshire, England

Coordinates: 54.204°N 0.943°W

Ness
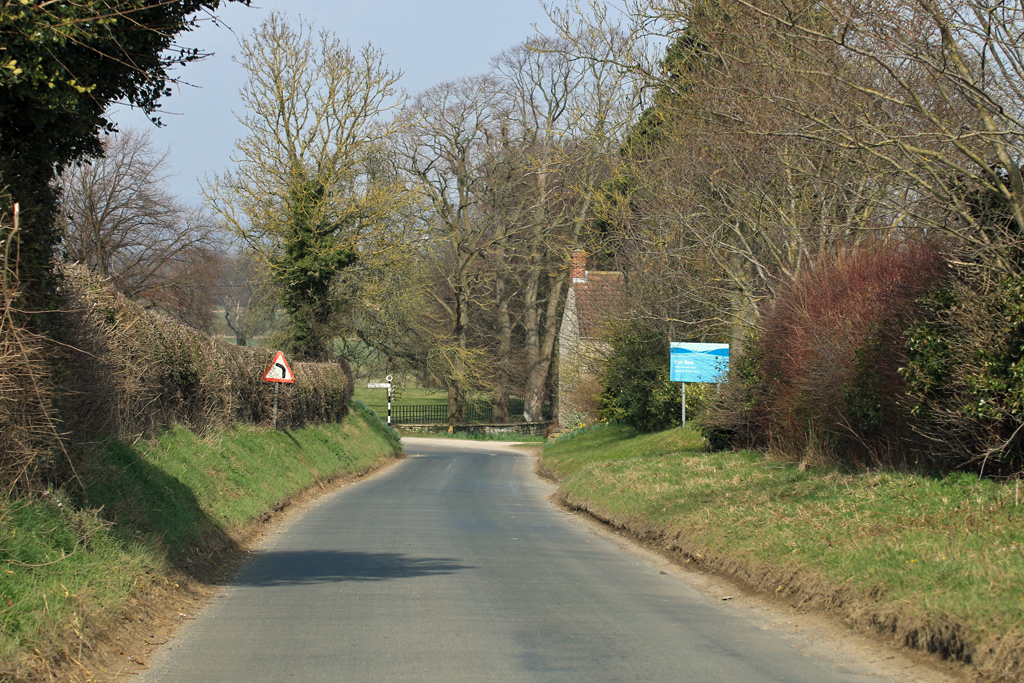
- Entering East Ness from South Holme

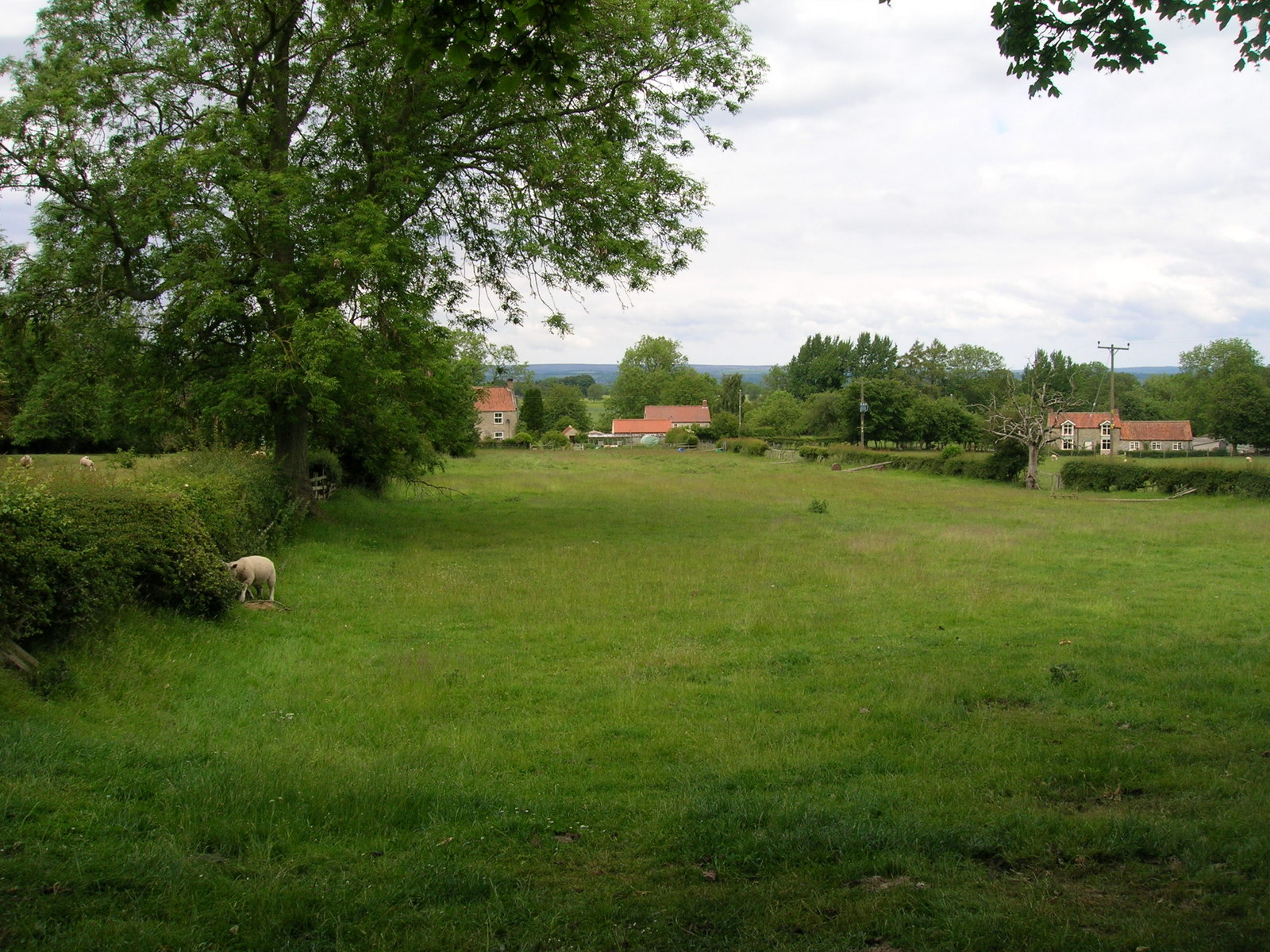
- Meadow in West Ness

- Location within North Yorkshire
- Civil parish: Nunnington
- Unitary authority: North Yorkshire
- Ceremonial county: North Yorkshire
- Region: Yorkshire and the Humber
- Country: England
- Sovereign state: United Kingdom
- Police: North Yorkshire
- Fire: North Yorkshire
- Ambulance: Yorkshire

Ness is a former civil parish, now in the parish of Nunnington, on the south bank of the River Rye in North Yorkshire, England. It contained the hamlets of East Ness and West Ness.

The name Ness may mean "nose" or "headland" in Medieval Norse, as Ness is the start of the hill that ultimately rises up to become Sutton Bank. It may also come from Old English, meaning a place at the promontory or projecting ridge.

The civil parish was formed on 24 March 1887 from "East Ness" and "West Ness". On 1 April 1986 the parish was abolished and merged with Nunnington. In 1971 the parish had a population of 39. Until 1974 it was in the North Riding of Yorkshire. From 1974 to 2023 it was part of the district of Ryedale, it is now administered by the unitary North Yorkshire Council.

The village of Ness is believed to have been split into West and East, following the Norman Invasion as the ownership of the village was split between two landlords. This land ownership split still continues today.

To the East of Ness, at the base of the hill, there are a considerable number of springs. Behind Ness Hall there is a large undercover Yorkshire Water reservoir, filled with water pumped from the springs.

Ness has an interesting Roman connection. It is believed a Roman Villa or fort existed on the hill top and various items have been found to support this. Bulmer's Directory (1890) states that a sarcophagus was found in 1616 with the inscription: TITIA PINTA VIXIT xxxviii ET VAL ADIVTORI VIXIT ANN xx ET VARIOLO VIXIT ANN xv VAL VINDICIANVS CONIYGIE T FILLS. Bulmers Directory notes, "This monument, the inscription tells us, was erected by Valerius Vindicianus to the memory of his wife, Titia, who died at the age of 38, and of his two sons Valerius Adjutor and Variolus, who died at the ages of 20 and 15 respectively. Vindician was probably the occupant of the Roman villa, to which the bath and tesselated floor above mentioned belonged; and that whilst in command of the fort or camp here he lost his wife and two sons." Early Ordnance Survey maps show the deemed location of the Sarcophagus.

Ness Hall in East Ness has a large walled garden which has been restored by Cynthia Murray Wells and subsequently Mary Murray Wells assisted by Harriette Murray Wells (daughter of John Skeffington, 14th Viscount Massereene). The garden is available for viewing on set dates each year under the National Garden Scheme.
