= St Giles' Church, Lockton =

Church in Lockton, North Yorkshire, England

Coordinates: 54.2987°N 0.7059°W

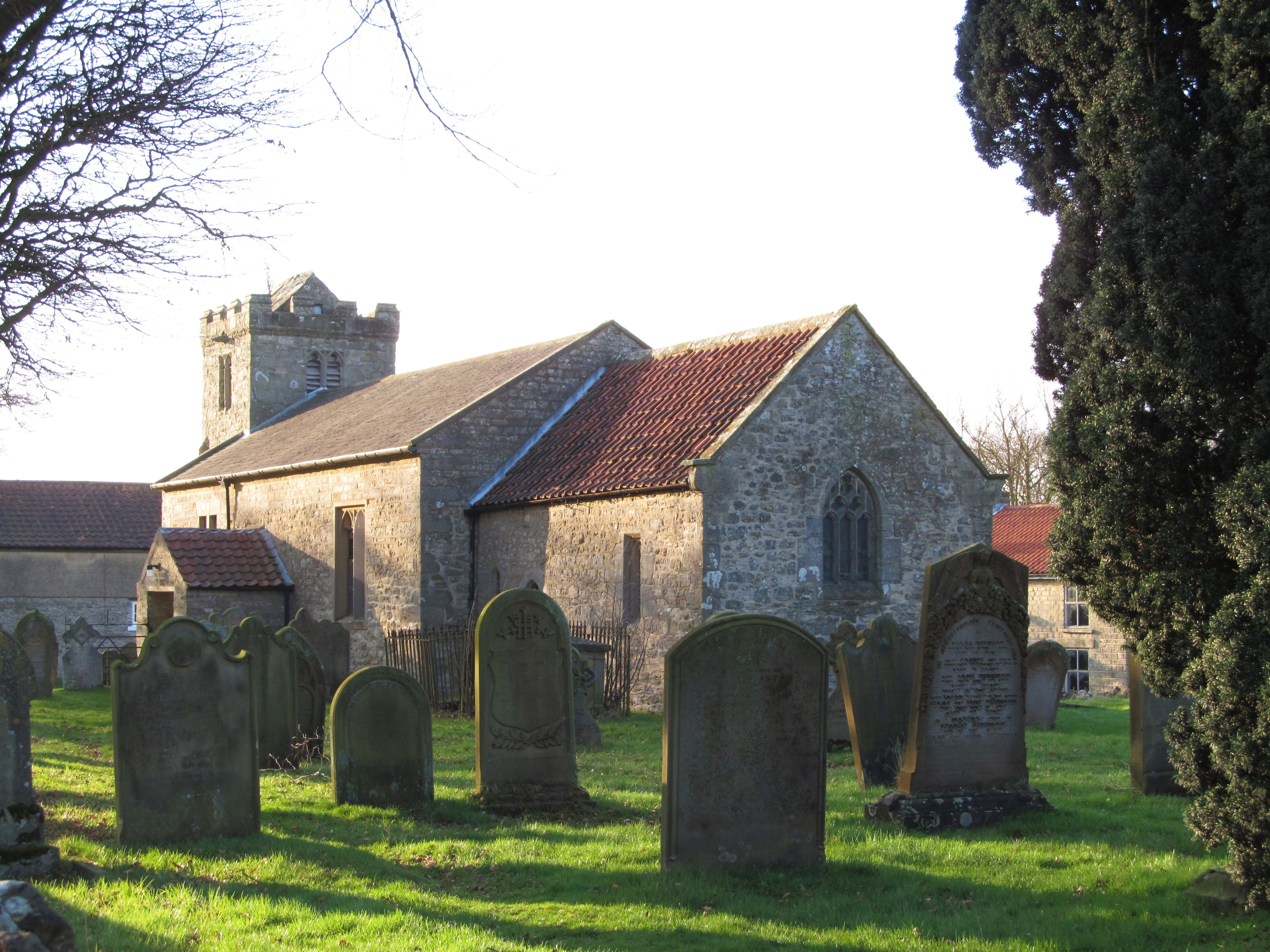
The church, in 2014

St Giles' Church is the parish church of Lockton, a village in North Yorkshire, in England.

The church was built in the 13th century. It was altered in the 15th century, when the tower was added, most of the windows altered, and the chancel arch was rebuilt. The east gable was rebuilt in 1723, then the porch was added in 1809, when the south doorway and west window were also rebuilt. The church was restored in the early 20th century, when some windows were again rebuilt. The church was grade II* listed in 1953.

The church has had various dedications. In 1923, it was dedicated to Saint Andrew, while Historic England originally listed it as Saint Mary, but it is now dedicated to Saint Giles.

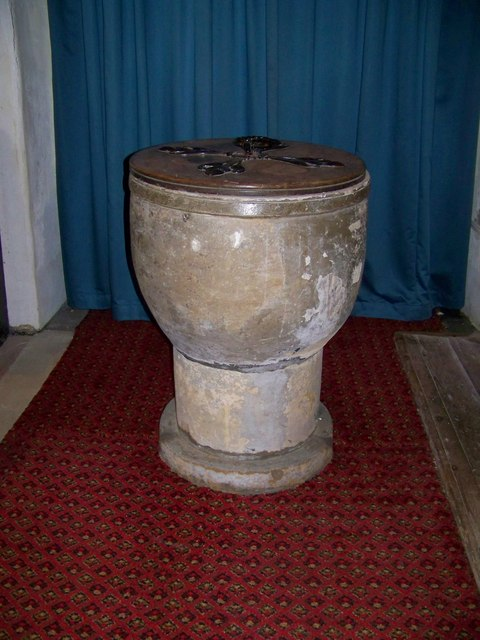
The font

The church is built of sandstone, the nave and tower have stone-flagged roofs, and the roofs of the chancel and porch are in pantile. The church consists of a nave, a south porch, a north vestry, a chancel and a west tower. The tower has two stages, diagonal buttresses, a two-light west window with a pointed arch, two-light bell openings, an embattled parapet and a saddleback roof. Inside, there is a 13th-century font, a late 17th-century octagonal pulpit, 17th-century altar rails, and a reused 17th-century pew for the vicar. The stained glass in the east window was installed in 1925.

== See also ==
- Grade II* listed churches in North Yorkshire (district)
- Listed buildings in Lockton
