= Vivers Mill =

Watermill in Pickering, North Yorkshire, England

Coordinates: 54.2399°N 0.7809°W

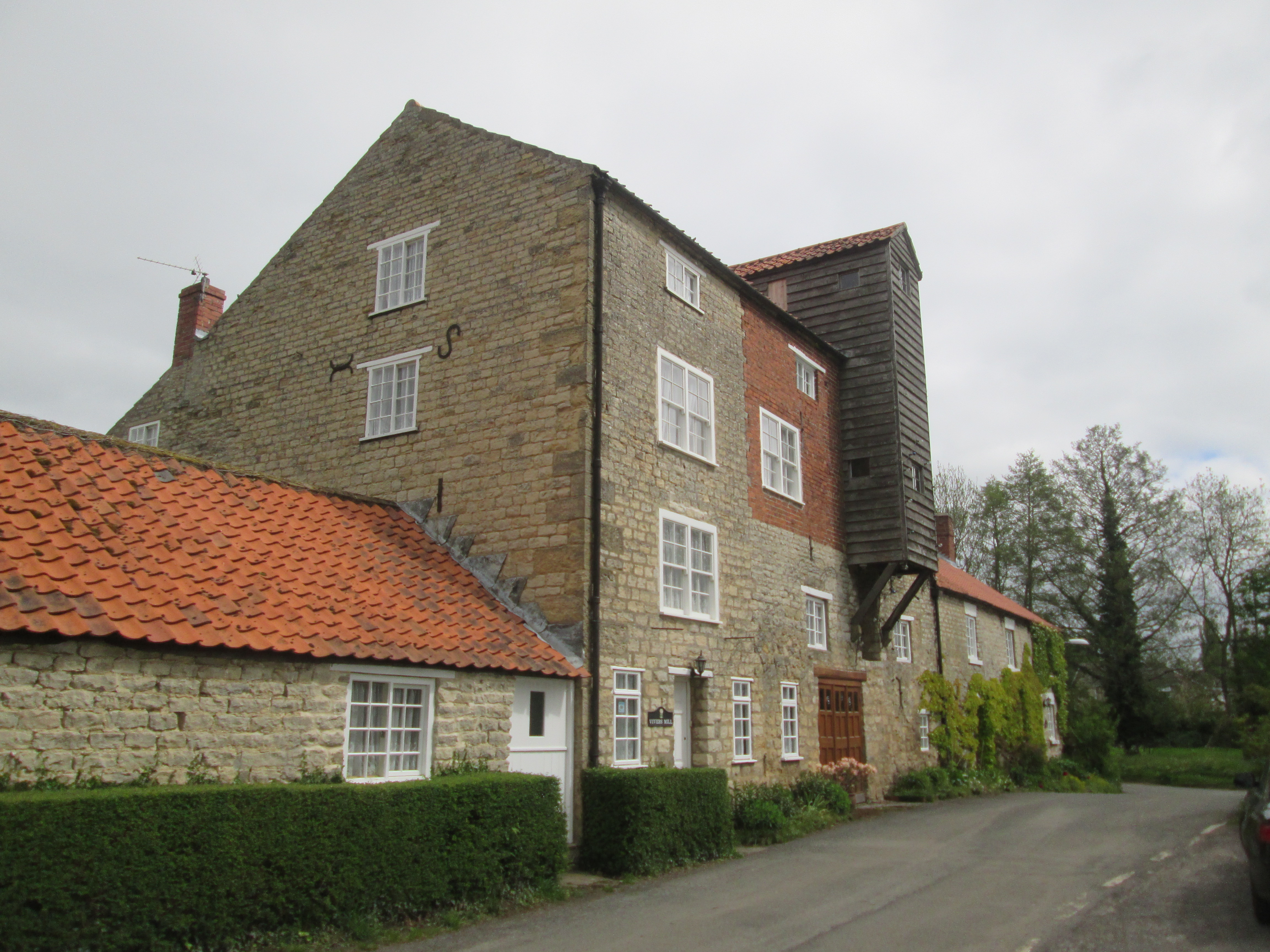
The building, in 2021

Vivers Mill is a historic watermill in Pickering, North Yorkshire, a town in England.

There is believed to have been a mill on Pickering Beck at the site since the 12th century. The current building was constructed in the early 19th century, along with an attached house, row of cottages, and outbuildings. In the late 20th century, it was converted into a house. It has been grade II listed since 1975.

The corn mill is built of stone and some brick, with quoins, four storeys and four bays. It contains doorways, windows and a weatherboarded gabled hoist. To the left is a single storey extension, and to the right is the mill house, with two storeys, two bays and horizontally sliding sash windows, and an archway over a stream. At the rear are a cottage and outbuildings. Inside, the waterwheel survives, and there are exposed beams and vaulted brickwork.

== See also ==
- Listed buildings in Pickering, North Yorkshire
