= Listed buildings in Levisham =

Levisham is a civil parish in the county of North Yorkshire, England. It contains nine listed buildings that are recorded in the National Heritage List for England. Of these, one is listed at Grade II*, the middle of the three grades, and the others are at Grade II, the lowest grade. The parish contains the village of Levisham and the surrounding countryside. Most of the listed buildings are houses and farmhouses, and the others consist of a redundant church and a ruined shooting lodge.

== Key ==
Grade	Criteria
II*	Particularly important buildings of more than special interest
II	Buildings of national importance and special interest

== Buildings ==
Name and location	Photograph	Date	Notes	Grade
St Mary's Church; 54.29910°N 0.72243°W		11th century	The church has been altered and extended through the centuries, the vestry and tower date from 1897, and the church is now redundant. It is built in limestone, the nave is without a roof, and the chancel has a pantile roof. The church consists of a nave, a chancel and north vestry, and a west tower. The tower has two stages, a chamfered plinth, quoins, a three-light Perpendicular-style west window over which is a corbelled hood mould and a plaque, a south doorway, paired bell openings and an embattled parapet.	II*
Rose Cottage and outbuildings 54.30311°N 0.72133°W	—	Early to mid 18th century	A farmhouse, later a house, and attached farm buildings, in sandstone with pantile roofs. The house has two storeys and two bays, and the gable end faces the street. On the front is a doorway, and the windows are casements. The outbuildings have two storeys and five bays. They contain square-arched cart openings, pitching doors and windows, and stable doors, and all the ground floor openings have quoined surrounds.	II
Glebe Farmhouse and railings 54.30325°N 0.72131°W	—	Late 18th century	The farmhouse is in limestone, with quoins, and a pantile roof with coped gables and shaped kneelers. There are two storeys and three bays. The central doorway has a patterned fanlight, and the windows are sashes. All the openings on the front have wedge lintels. At the rear is a round-headed stair window. In front of the house are cast iron railings and a gate with spearhead and mace finials, on a stone plinth.	II
Kidsty; 54.33983°N 0.72508°W	—	Late 18th century	The house is in sandstone, and has a pantile roof with coped gables and shaped kneelers. There are two storeys and two bays, and a lower two-bay range on the left. In the lower range is a doorway and a pivoting window, and the other windows are sashes.	II
Lowstead Farmhouse; 54.30204°N 0.72129°W	—	Late 18th century	The farmhouse, incorporating an earlier house, and later a private house, is in sandstone, with quoins, a stepped eaves course, and a pantile roof with coped gables and shaped kneelers. The main block has two storeys and two bays, to the left is a lower range with two storeys and an attic, and at the rear is an outshut. The main block contains sash windows, and in the lower range is a doorway with a fanlight, horizontally-sliding sash windows, and a dormer.	II
Farm building to the rear of Lowstead Farmhouse; 54.30203°N 0.72162°W	—	Late 18th century	The farm building, consisting of a barn with a granary above, and an attached range of loose boxes, is in sandstone, with quoins, and pantile roofs with coped gables. The barn has two storeys, with a lean-to byre on the left, and a single-storey range of loose boxes at right angles. The openings include a cart arch with a quoined surround, and a stable door.	II
Manor Farmhouse; 54.30446°N 0.72075°W	—	Late 18th century	A farmhouse and cottage combined into a house, it is in limestone, and has a pantile roof with coped gables and shaped kneelers. There are two storeys and three bays, and a single-storey two-bay extension on the left. On the front are two doorways with fanlights, the left fanlight blind, and all the windows are sashes. The ground floor openings have heavy tooled lintels, and in the upper floor the lintels are in timber.	II
Station House; 54.30824°N 0.74457°W		Late 18th century	The house on Levisham railway station originated as a farmhouse, it was later converted into a station house and ticket office, and later into a private house. It is in sandstone with a slate roof. There are two storeys and three bays, the right bay projecting. On the front is a gabled porch, and the windows are sashes.	II
Skelton's Tower; 54.32485°N 0.74060°W		Early 19th century	A shooting lodge, now in ruins, in a prominent position. It is in sandstone and has a square plan. There are two storeys and a front of one bay. It contains a doorway, and windows with pointed heads.	II
