= River Rye, Yorkshire =

River in North Yorkshire, England

River Rye
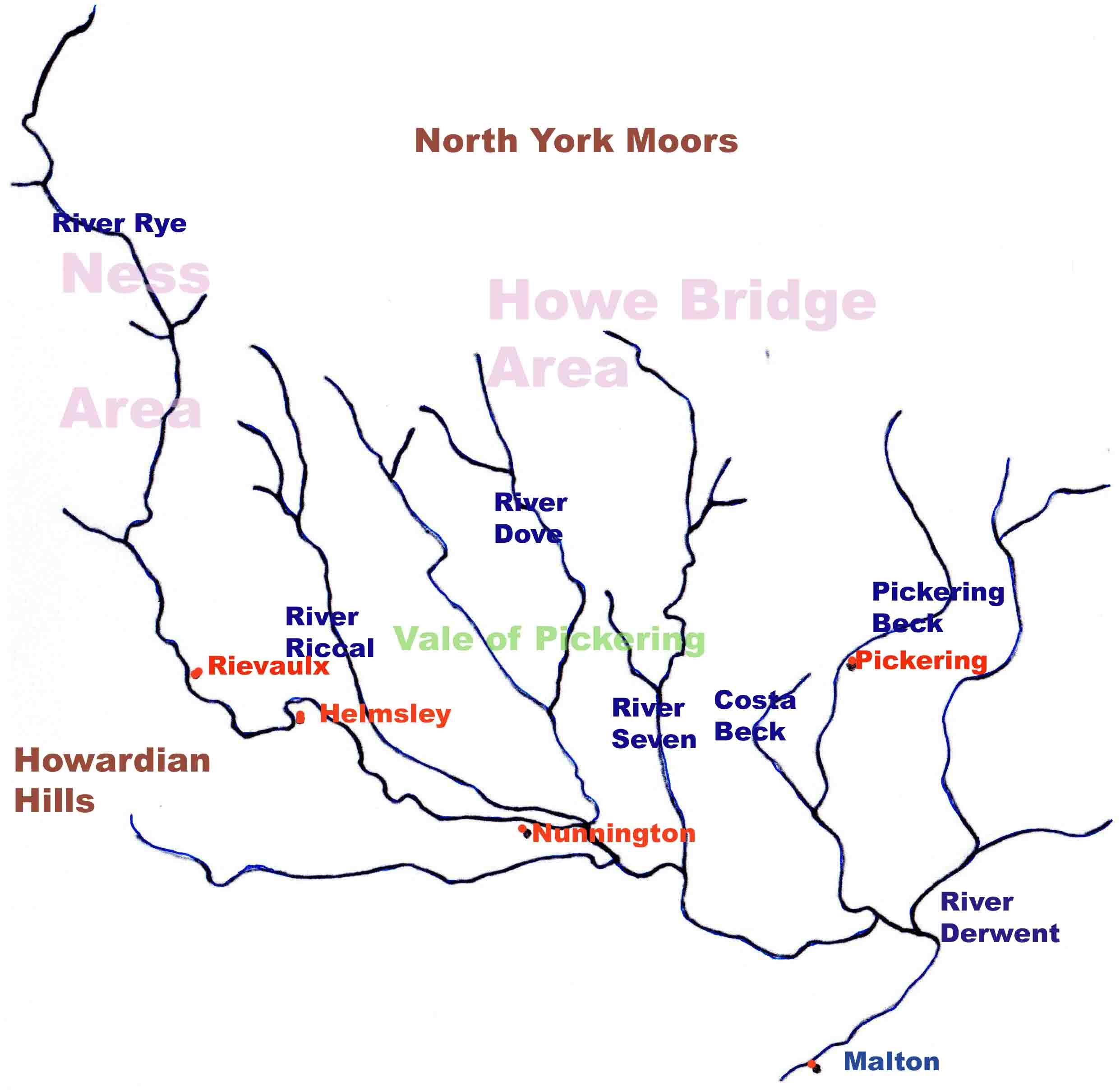
- The catchment area of the River Rye

Physical characteristics
- Source
  - location: Cleveland Hills
  - elevation: 660 ft (200 m)
- Mouth
  - location: Howe Bridge
- Basin size: 330 mi^{2} (850 km^{2})

Basin features
- River system: River Derwent, Yorkshire

The River Rye in the English county of North Yorkshire rises just south of the Cleveland Hills, east of Osmotherley. It flows through Ryedale and the communities of Hawnby, Rievaulx, Helmsley, Nunnington, West and East Ness, Butterwick, Brawby, and Ryton, before joining the River Derwent at 54°10′N 00°44′W near Malton.

The river valley (dale) gave its name to the Ryedale District, a former shire district that extended southwest into the Vale of Pickering along the River Derwent. The district existed from 1974 to 2021, when it was subsumed into the larger North Yorkshire unitary authority.

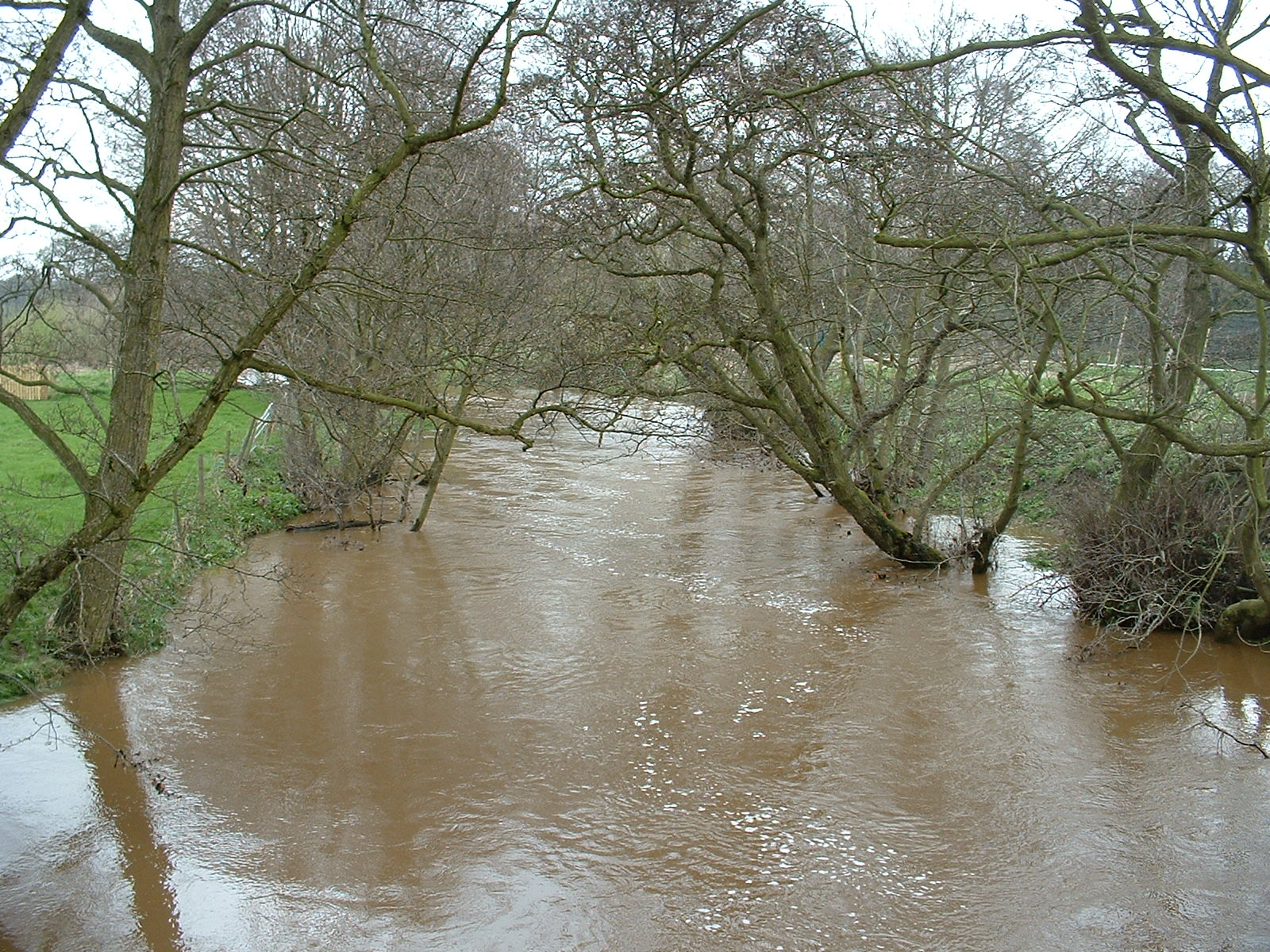
River Rye near Nunnington, swollen after heavy rain.

== Course ==
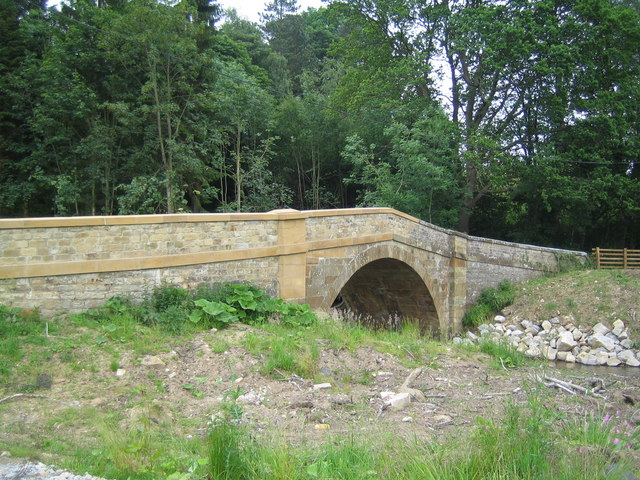
Church Bridge at Hawnby crossing the upper reaches of the River Rye.

The river rises at Rye Head near Snilesworth Lodge on Snilesworth Moor in the Cleveland Hills and collects the River Seph which flows along Bilsdale. It passes Rievaulx Abbey and enters the Vale of Pickering at Helmsley. In its eastward course from Helmsley, the Rye receives the River Dove from Farndale which has previously added the Hodge Beck from Bransdale. Hodge Beck is partly swallowed by the limestone aquifer in Kirkdale and issues again further down the valley. Kirkbymoorside is on the River Dove which, like Hodge Beck has a partly subterranean course. Rosedale sends down the River Seven which comes by Sinnington to join the Rye. The steep-sided Newtondale gives Pickering Beck which joins the Costa Beck before it enters the River Rye just before its mouth into River Derwent.

== Areas ==
For management purposes the River Rye is divided into two units, Ness and Howe Bridge.

=== Ness ===
Ness is the upstream area and covers 59,000 acres (240 km^{2}). It covers the River Rye and its tributaries from its source to its confluence with the River Dove near the village of East Ness.

The Ness area is mainly rural with dispersed settlements. It has varied topography, the northern part is dominated by upland moors which are over 660 feet (200 m) in height in the North York Moors National Park. Here the land use is largely managed grassland. Downstream, as the river approaches Rievaulx and Helmsley the land is around 330 feet (100 m) in height and falls to 160 feet (49 m) at East Ness. In the lower part, land use is a mixture of managed grassland and arable farming with pockets of forestry and woodland close to the river.

Abstraction from the river is mainly to supply a fish farm at Harome and this water is returned to the river. Wastewater treatment works have been built at Helmsley and Sproxton. The ecology and fisheries are highly sensitive to changers in water flow.

=== Howe Bridge ===
The Howe Bridge area covers 152,000 acres (620 km^{2}). It covers the River Rye from East Ness to its confluence with the River Derwent just beyond Howe Bridge. In this area the main tributaries are the River Riccal, River Dove (with Hodge Beck), River Seven, Costa Beck and Pickering Beck.

The market towns of Pickering and Kirkbymoorside are the largest settlements. Otherwise the area is rural with a varied topography. To the north is the upland moorland of the North York moors with the valleys of Bransdale, Farndale, Rosedale and Newtondale. Much of the moorland is over 980 feet (300 m) in height with the highest point being 1,410 feet (430 m). To the south the tributaries from the valleys converge and the land becomes flatter. It is mainly lower than 330 feet (100 m). To the south-west the Howe Bridge area covers the undulating landscape of the Howardian Hills.

The largest abstractions are for fish farming. Wastewater treatment works are at Pickering, Harome and Kirkbymoorside.

== Geology ==
At source the River Rye and its tributaries run over Corallian limestone which outcrops on the hills surrounding the Vale of Pickering. In places the major aquifer is exposed in the river bed and river water is lost through swallow holes at Kirkdale and Kirkby Mills. Beneath the course of the Rye and its tributaries in the Vale of Pickering lie the lacustrine deposits from the last ice age. Newtondale was a melt water channel draining the North York Moors at the end of the ice age and its valley is much more deeply incised than the flow of the present Pickering Beck would suggest.

== History ==
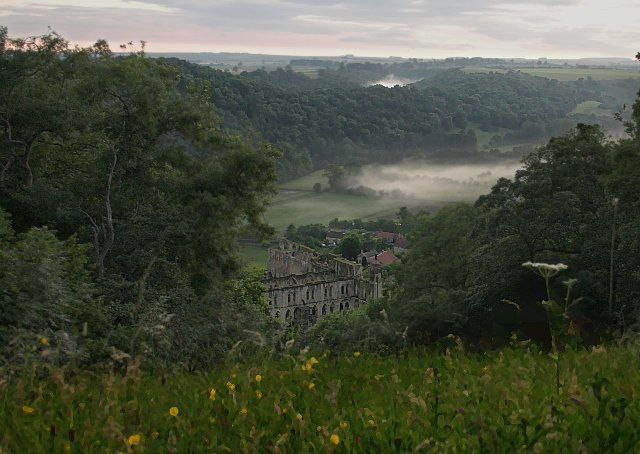
Rye Valley at Rievaulx Abbey

The upland streams of the Rye and its tributaries have powered water mills for centuries. There were three mills at Pickering and others at Kirkby Mills, near Kirkbymoorside. A mill at Bransdale is owned by the National Trust, though not open to visitors. Rievaulx Abbey was established on the banks of the Rye on land given by Walter l'Espec of Helmsley and took its name from a literal translation of Rye Valley from the French. The monks of Rievaulx diverted the river away from the abbey buildings.

On the Costa Beck south of Pickering traces of a prehistoric settlement were excavated in the late-19th century.

== Economy ==
The main economic value of the River Rye lies in its use as a water source for agriculture, domestic supply, fisheries and leisure pursuits. It also drains the water discharged by wastewater treatment works.

== Nature protection ==
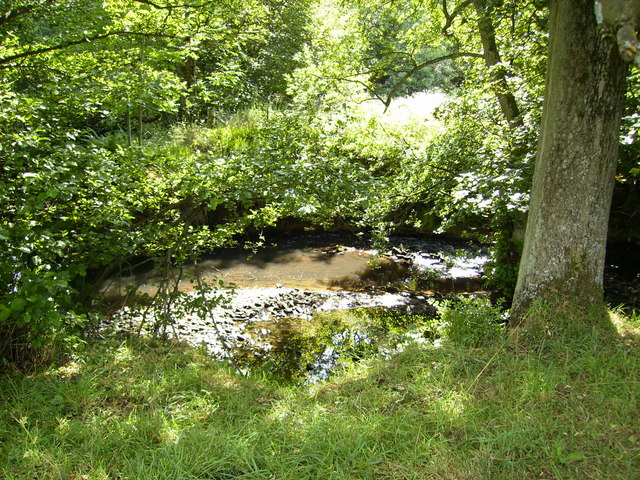
Farndale is a Site of Special Scientific Interest

There are many sites in the Rye catchment area which have designated status.

North York Moors are designated as a Special Protection Area, providing protection to birds, their nests, eggs and habitats and a Special Area of Conservation, contributug to biodiversity by maintaining and restoring habitats and species other than birds.

Sites of Special Scientific Interest in the area include Farndale; Cropton Banks and Howlgate Head Woods; Newton Dale; The Ings of Amotherby; Duncombe Park; Ashberry and Reins Woods; Rievaulx Woods; Ryedale Windy Pits and North York Moors.

Duncombe Park is a National Nature Reserve (NNR), while the Howardian Hills are an Area of Outstanding Natural Beauty.
