= Newton Dale Halt railway station =

Railway station in North Yorkshire, England

Newton Dale Halt
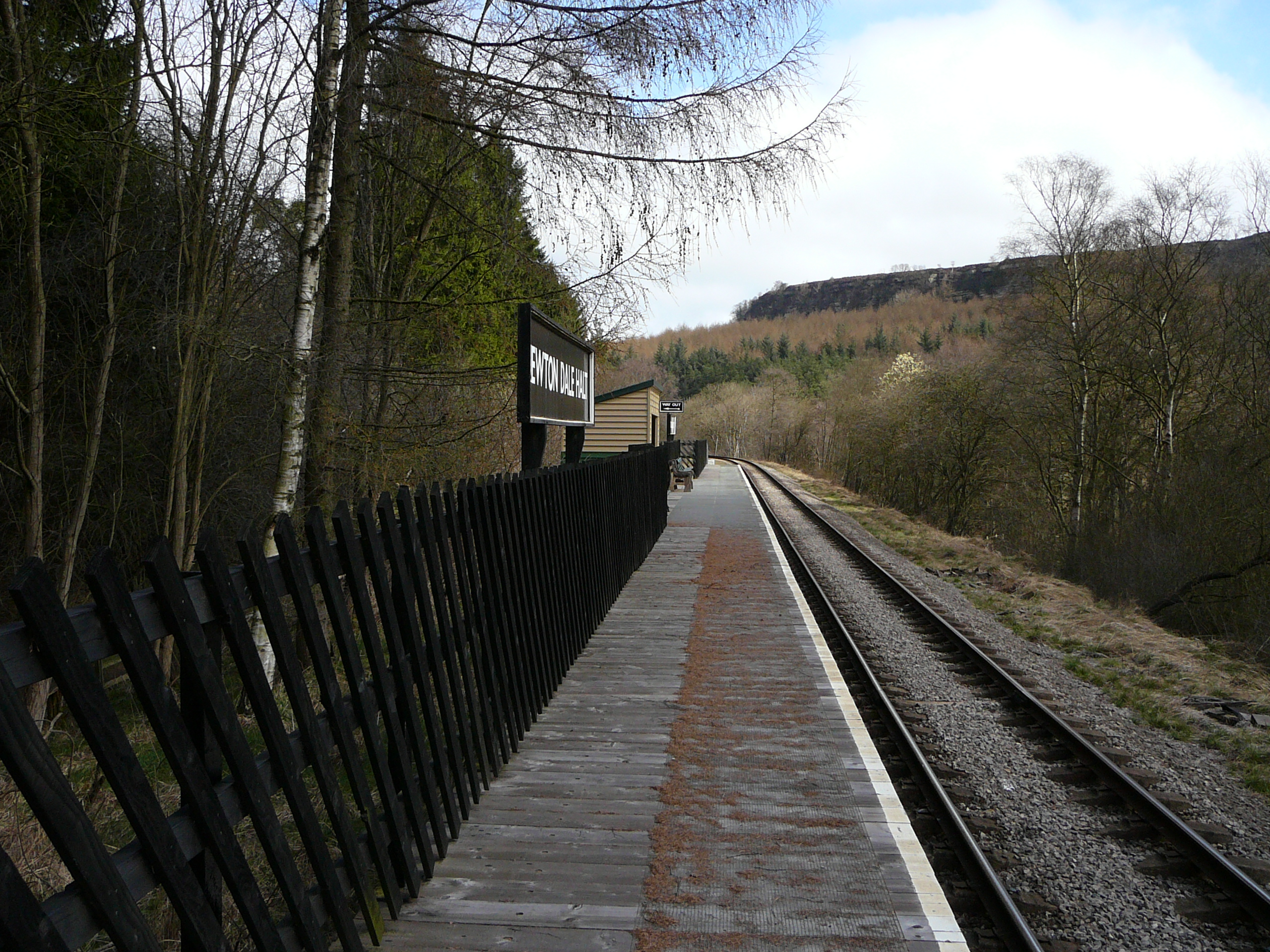

General information
- Location: Cropton Forest, North Yorkshire; England
- Coordinates: 54.342381°N 0.717638°W
- Grid reference: SE834948
- System: Station on heritage railway
- Manager: North Yorkshire Moors Railway
- Platforms: 1

Key dates
- 1981: opened
Location

Newton Dale Halt railway station is a request stop on the North Yorkshire Moors Railway and serves as a stopping off point for walkers around Newton Dale and Cropton Forest in the North York Moors National Park, North Yorkshire, England. When the station was opened, the station signs were written as Newtondale Halt.

The halt was built by the North Yorkshire Moors Railway using materials from Warrenby Halt, near Redcar. The halt was a new construction that was a joint enterprise between the NYMR, the Forestry Commission and the North York Moors National Park Authority. The station was opened on 23 April 1981 by Hector Monro (Minister for Sport), near to the former Newtondale signal box that had last been used in 1930 and was demolished by the NYMR in 1995 due to it being unsafe.

The station is a request stop, and there is no road access to the site. Newton Dale Halt is known for being one of the remotest stations in England due to the lack of road access.

A small NER style wooden waiting shelter was erected at the halt in 2003. It is based on the design of the one which used to stand at Sledmere and Fimber on the closed Malton & Driffield Railway but reduced in size and eliminating the windows.

There are four different waymarked walks from Newton Dale Halt, provided by the National Park in conjunction with the Forestry Commission. The walks vary in length and difficulty to suit most walkers. The longer walks take the walker to Levisham station. For the more enthusiastic (and better equipped) walker there are public footpaths leading elsewhere, including Goathland station but definitive maps are advisable.

| Preceding station | Heritage railways | Following station |
|---|---|---|
| Levisham towards Pickering | North Yorkshire Moors Railway | Goathland towards Whitby |
