= Yorkshire Coastliner bus routes 840 and 843 =

Bus routes in Yorkshire, England

Yorkshire Coastliner Routes 840 & 843

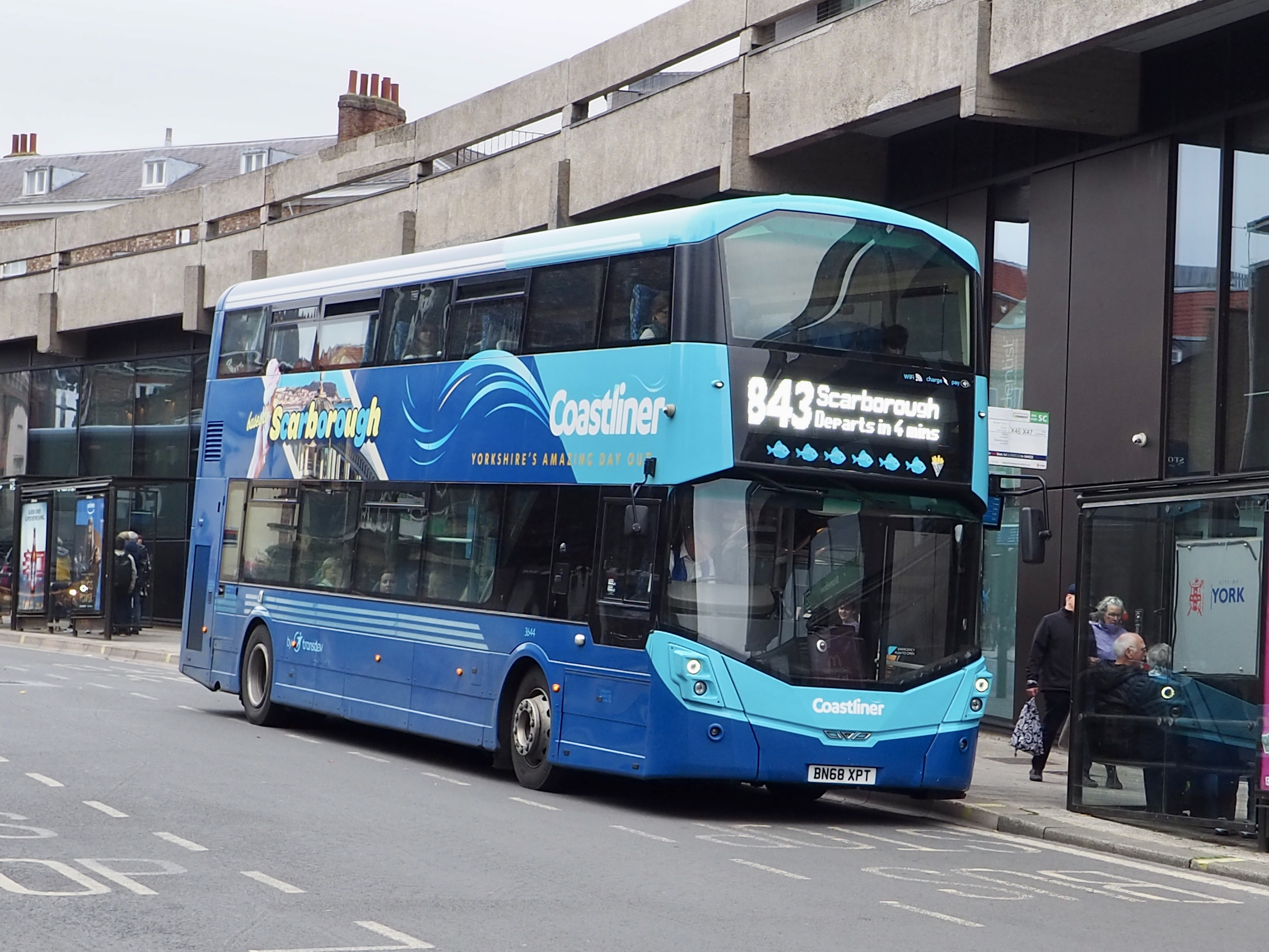
- A Wright Gemini 3 bodied Volvo B5TL in York, operating service 843 in September 2024

Overview
- Operator: Yorkshire Coastliner; (a Transdev Blazefield subsidiary)
- Depot: Malton
- Vehicles: Wright Eclipse Gemini 2 bodied Volvo B9TL (since 2011); Wright Gemini 3 bodied Volvo B5TL (since 2017)

Route
- Locale: North Yorkshire; West Yorkshire
- Start: Leeds
- Via: Tadcaster; York; Malton; Pickering (840); Thornton-le-Dale (840); Goathland (840)
- End: Whitby (840); Scarborough (843)
- Length: 75 miles (840, Leeds to Whitby)

Service
- Frequency: Every 20–60 minutes (Note: Combining the two routes, buses run up to every 20 minutes from Leeds to York, and up to every 30 minutes from Leeds to Malton. In separation, buses run up to every 60 minutes for further journeys to Thornton-le-Dale/Whitby and Scarborough.)
- Journey time: 3 hours 55 minutes (840); 3 hours 25 minutes (843); 2 hours 25 minutes (X43)
- Timetable: Route 840 timetable; Route 843 timetable

Coastliner is the brand name of bus routes 840 and 843 operating in North Yorkshire and West Yorkshire, England. It links Leeds, Tadcaster, York and Malton with the coastal towns of Whitby (840) and Scarborough (843).

The routes are some of the longest public transport bus services in England, and the 840 was voted to be the "most scenic bus route in Britain" in a nationwide poll.

== History ==
Bullock & Sons were the first company to run omnibuses along the entire route of Leeds to Scarborough. The seasonal service began in February 1927, following licencing by the Watch Committee. Prior to this, the Leeds to York section of the route is thought to have been first operated by Dibbs & Warnes of Tadcaster on 10 July 1922. The company was later acquired by the Harrogate & District Road Car Company in July 1926, who then later extended their service to Scarborough in 1928, running every 2 hours at a total journey time of 3 hours and 55 minutes. The route was further extended to start from Manchester in January 1929. Additionally, Yorkshire Traction began a service from Huddersfield to Scarborough on 29 July 1929. Riley & Hawkridge of Wetherby are thought to have run the first service from York to Scarborough with service starting prior to the mid-1920s.

The first buses to run from Leeds to Bridlington began service in 1930, jointly operated by the West Yorkshire Road Car Company and East Yorkshire Motor Services.

By the 1970s, the West Yorkshire Road Car Company operated numerous routes following nationalisation in 1968. These included the 43 from Bradford to Scarborough via Leeds, York and Malton (as well as the X43 limited-stop variant, extending to Filey, and the 43A short service from Leeds to Malton) and the 84 from Harrogate to Scarborough via York and Malton. During deregulation in the 1980s, a staff competition led to the selection of Yorkshire Coastliner as the new brand name for services to the Yorkshire coast. After privatisation in 1987, the West Yorkshire Road Car company was broken up, with services to the Yorkshire Coast operated by the new Yorkshire Coastliner subsidiary of the AJS Group until 1991, when they were acquired by the Blazefield Holdings Group.

In June 2000, a fleet of Alexander Royale bodied Volvo Olympian double-deck vehicles were delivered and entered service on the routes. These have been regarded to be the final step-entrance double deckers ordered by a UK operator.

In 2004, an order was placed for six Wright Eclipse Commuter bodied Volvo B7RLE single-deck vehicles, however this order was later modified for the buses to feature Wright Eclipse Urban bodies instead.

In January 2006, the French-based operator Transdev acquired the Blazefield Holdings Group – the parent company of Yorkshire Coastliner and the current operator of the routes.

In Summer 2011, four Wright Eclipse Gemini 2 bodied Volvo B9TL double-deck vehicles were delivered and entered service on the routes.

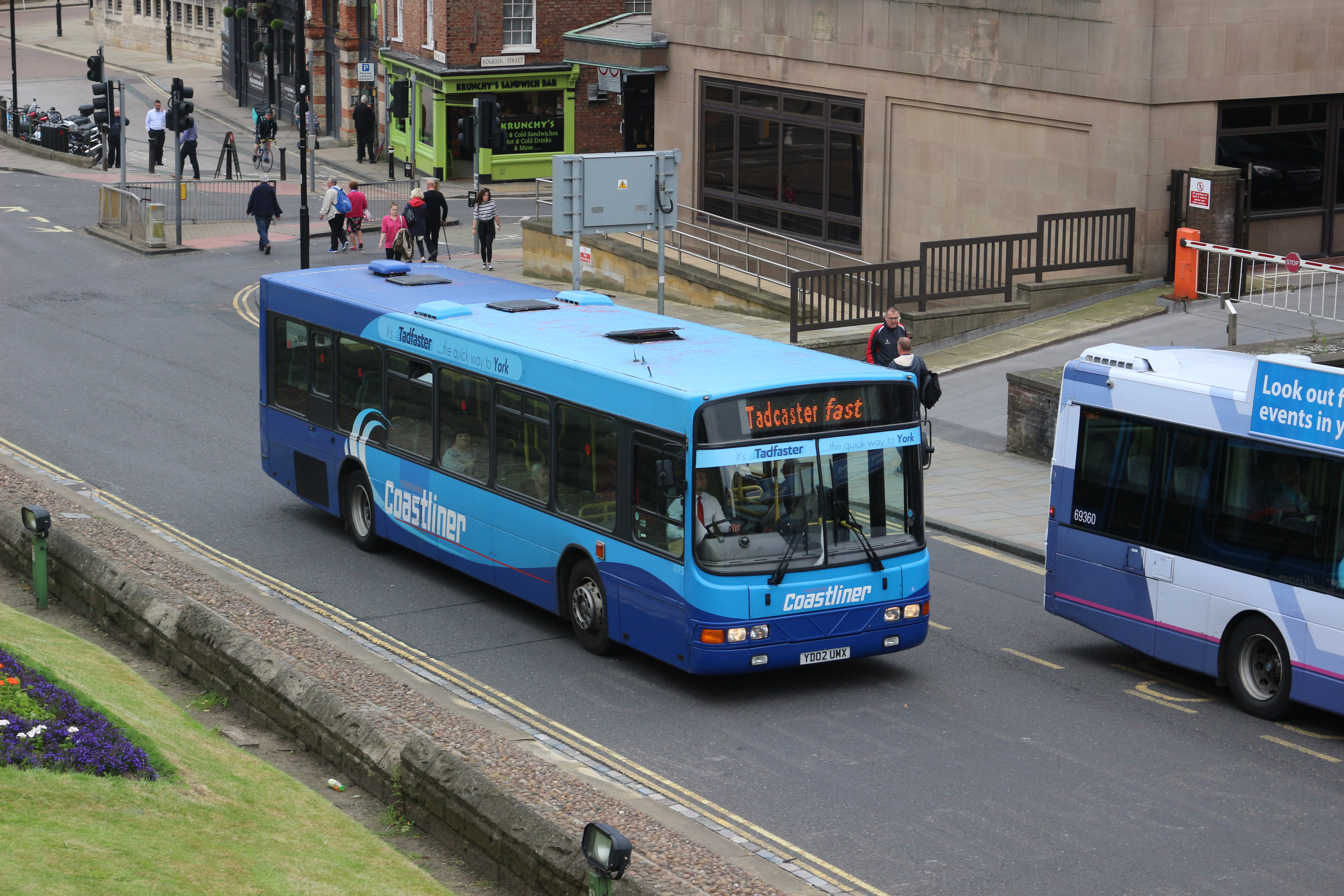
A Tadfaster branded Wright Renown bodied Volvo B10BLE in York, operating the service in June 2016

Following the partial collapse of Tadcaster Bridge in December 2015, North Yorkshire County Council committed up to £20,000 to establish a shuttle bus service, named Tadfaster, to connect Tadcaster and York during the bridge's reconstruction. The service commenced in February 2016.

In 2016, a fleet of ten Wright Gemini 3 bodied Volvo B5TL double-deck vehicles were unveiled, representing an investment worth £2.34 million. These buses featured a new two-tone blue livery, and were launched at an event at York Minster in December. The vehicles entered service in early 2017, with an additional three joining the fleet in September 2018.

In Summer 2018, a range of limited-stop services named Coastliner Express were introduced. These services initially only called at Leeds, Seacroft and York, with route X40 running fast to Whitby, and route X43 to Scarborough and Bridlington. The routes operated only during the summer season (July–September), and improved journey times by up to an hour. However, the routes were axed in 2020 due to the COVID-19 pandemic.

Also in 2018, the 845 service from Leeds to Filey and Bridlington was withdrawn, with the company claiming staff wages and low passenger numbers during winter had made running the service unsustainable, with the route being replaced by the (pre-2020) X43.

In May 2018, the 840 service, which runs between Leeds and Whitby, was voted as the "most scenic bus route in Britain" in an online poll.

In Summer 2022, the Coastliner Express route X43 was re-introduced, but it was modified to run between York and Whitby via Scarborough, reducing travel time from York to Scarborough from 2 hours to 90 minutes. As with the pre-2020 timetable, the route only runs during the summer season, and makes one return journey a day. In 2023, the route was extended to start from Leeds, and was cut to terminate at Scarborough.

In April 2023, the 840 was among eighty bus routes in North Yorkshire facing potential cancellation due to rising fuel prices, increased wage bills, higher costs for engineering materials and low passenger numbers which had rendered running the route unprofitable. However, the route was subsequently saved due to the success of the UK government's newly introduced financial support scheme for buses, which capped all single fares at £2.

In October 2024, the frequency of buses between Leeds and York was increased from every 30 minutes to every 20 minutes.

== Routes ==
Both routes 840 and 843 start at Leeds City bus station, before following the A64 until reaching the Leeds suburb of Seacroft. They then rejoin the A64, heading north-east to Tadcaster and arriving into Copmanthorpe. Continuing to York, they pass through York Station and the city centre, before proceeding north-east through the York suburb of Heworth and the village of Stockton-on-the-Forest, before rejoining the A64 and arriving into Malton.

At Malton, the routes diverge. Route 840 turns north towards Pickering, briefly detouring to Kirby Misperton (Note: Kirby Misperton is only served by journeys terminating at Thornton-le-Dale) (for Flamingo Land Resort). It then heads east along the A170 to Thornton-le-Dale, and north into the North York Moors along the A169 towards Goathland, before heading north-east to Whitby, where it terminates at the bus station.

Meanwhile, route 843 continues north-east through Norton-on-Derwent, rejoining the A64 and following it north at Staxton. It passes through Seamer and Crossgates before reaching Scarborough, where it terminates at Peasholm Park.

The summer-season X43 express route follows a similar route to the 843, but only calls at Seacroft Green and regular Coastliner bus stops in the areas of York and Malton.

Historically, there was a route 842 which ran from Leeds to Thornton-le-Dale, and a route 844 which ran from Leeds to York, however both of these routes have since been merged into short workings of the current routes. There was also a route 845 from Leeds to Filey and Bridlington, however this was withdrawn in 2018.

== Fleet ==
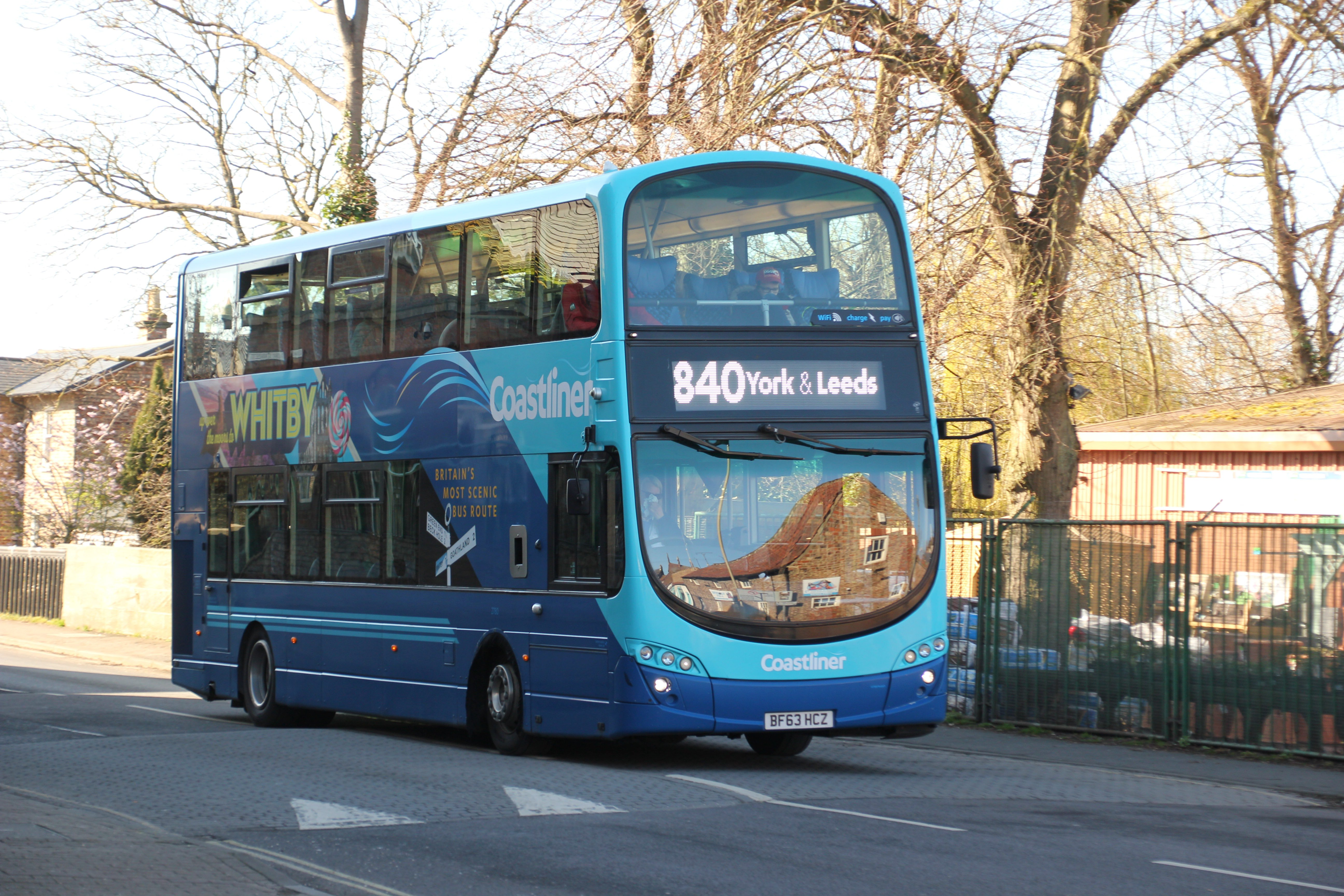
A Wright Eclipse Gemini 2 bodied Volvo B9TL in Malton, operating service 840 in March 2023

The routes are currently operated by Transdev Blazefield's Yorkshire Coastliner subsidiary with a fleet of thirteen high-specification Wright Gemini 3 bodied Volvo B5TL and four Wright Eclipse Gemini 2 bodied Volvo B9TL double-deck vehicles, branded in a two-tone blue livery. These vehicles include modern comfort-orientated amenities such as free WiFi connectivity, USB charging capabilities, audio-visual next stop announcements, high back coach-style seats upstairs and a luggage rack next to the doors. The Gemini 3s also include tables with wireless charging capabilities at a select few seats upstairs.

Short workings from Leeds to York are currently operated by single-decker vehicles from Yorkshire Coastliner's York & Country brand.

Some members of the historic fleet include:

- Plaxton Supreme bodied Leyland Leopard
- Eastern Coach Works bodied Leyland Olympian
- Alexander Royale bodied Volvo Olympian
- Plaxton Paramount III 3200 bodied Leyland Tiger
- Wright Renown bodied Volvo B10BLE
- Plaxton President bodied Volvo B7TL
- Wright Eclipse Gemini bodied Volvo B7TL and B9TL
- Wright Eclipse Urban bodied Volvo B7RLE
- Optare Versa

== Gallery ==
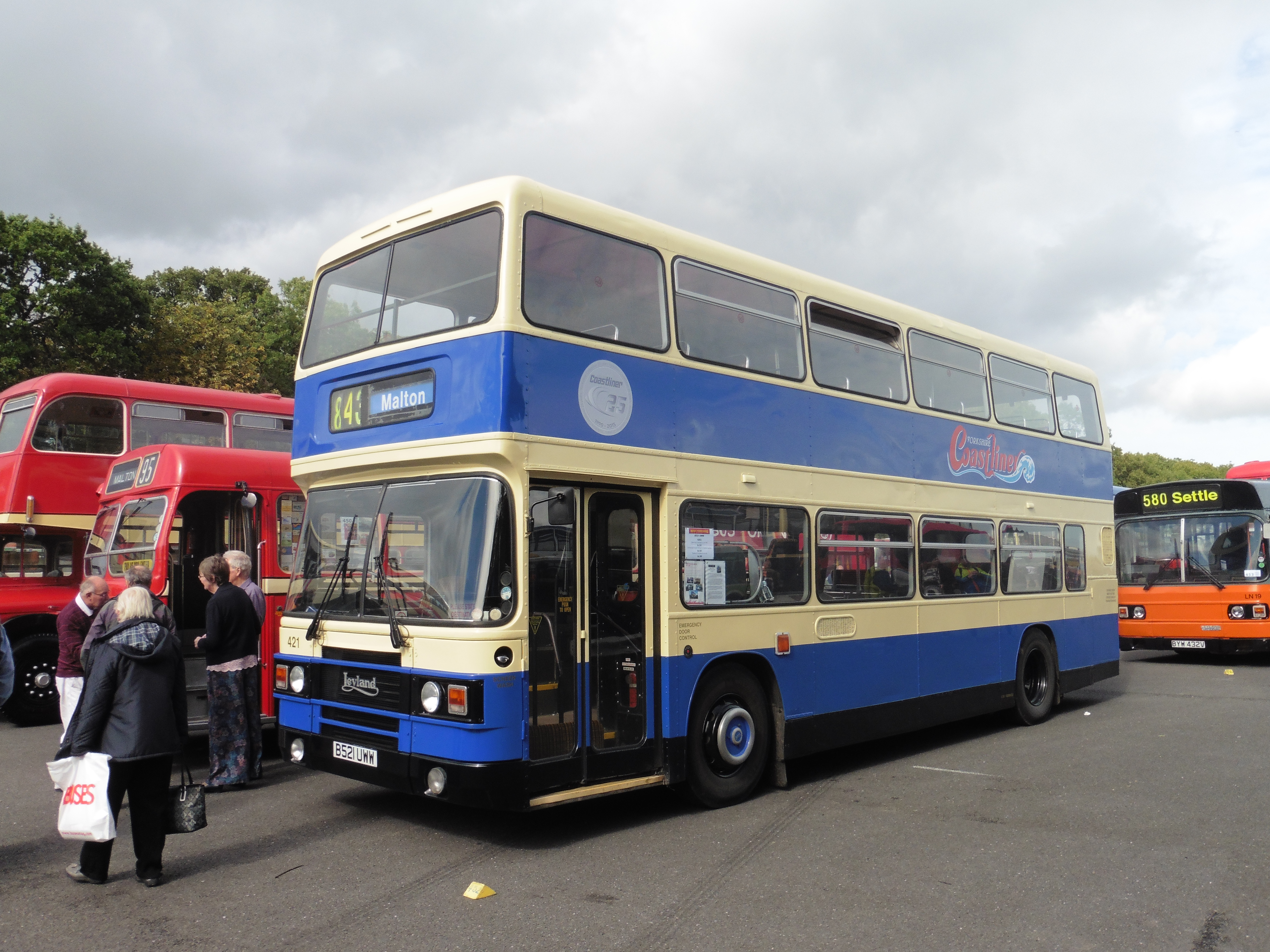
A preserved Eastern Coach Works bodied Leyland Olympian, at Showbus 2016

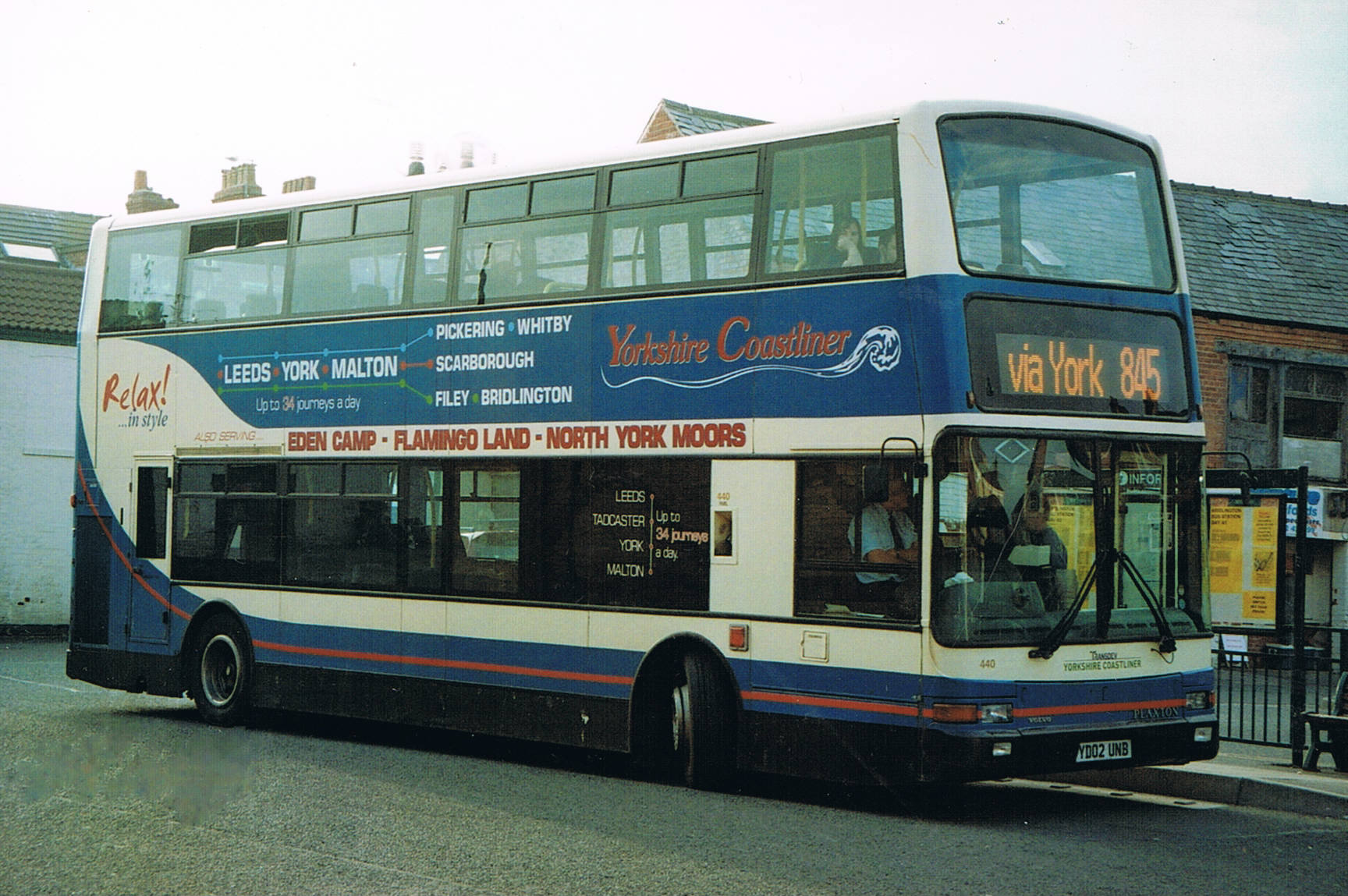
A Plaxton President bodied Volvo B7TL in Bridlington, operating service 845

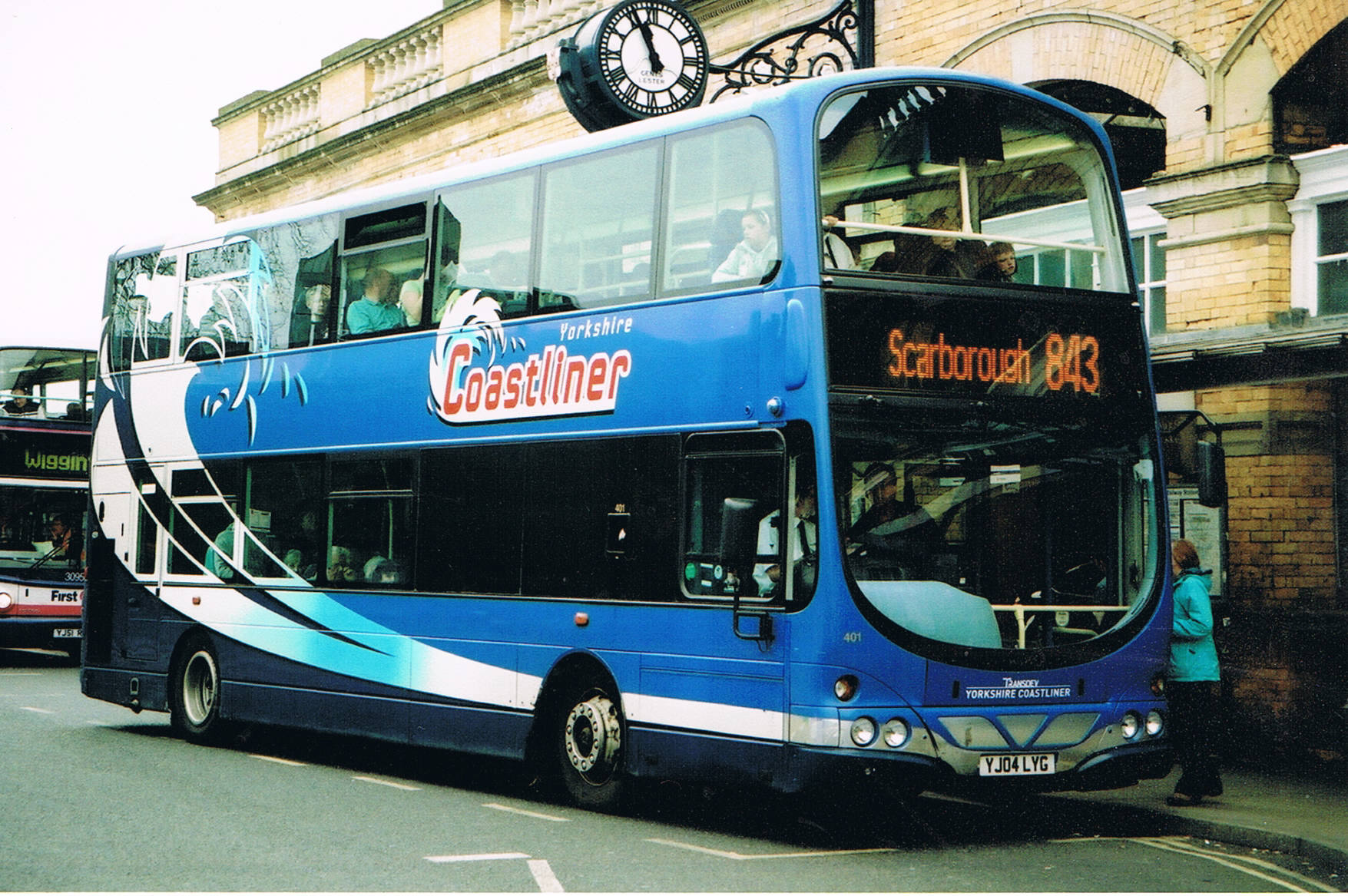
A Wright Eclipse Gemini bodied Volvo B7TL in York, operating service 843

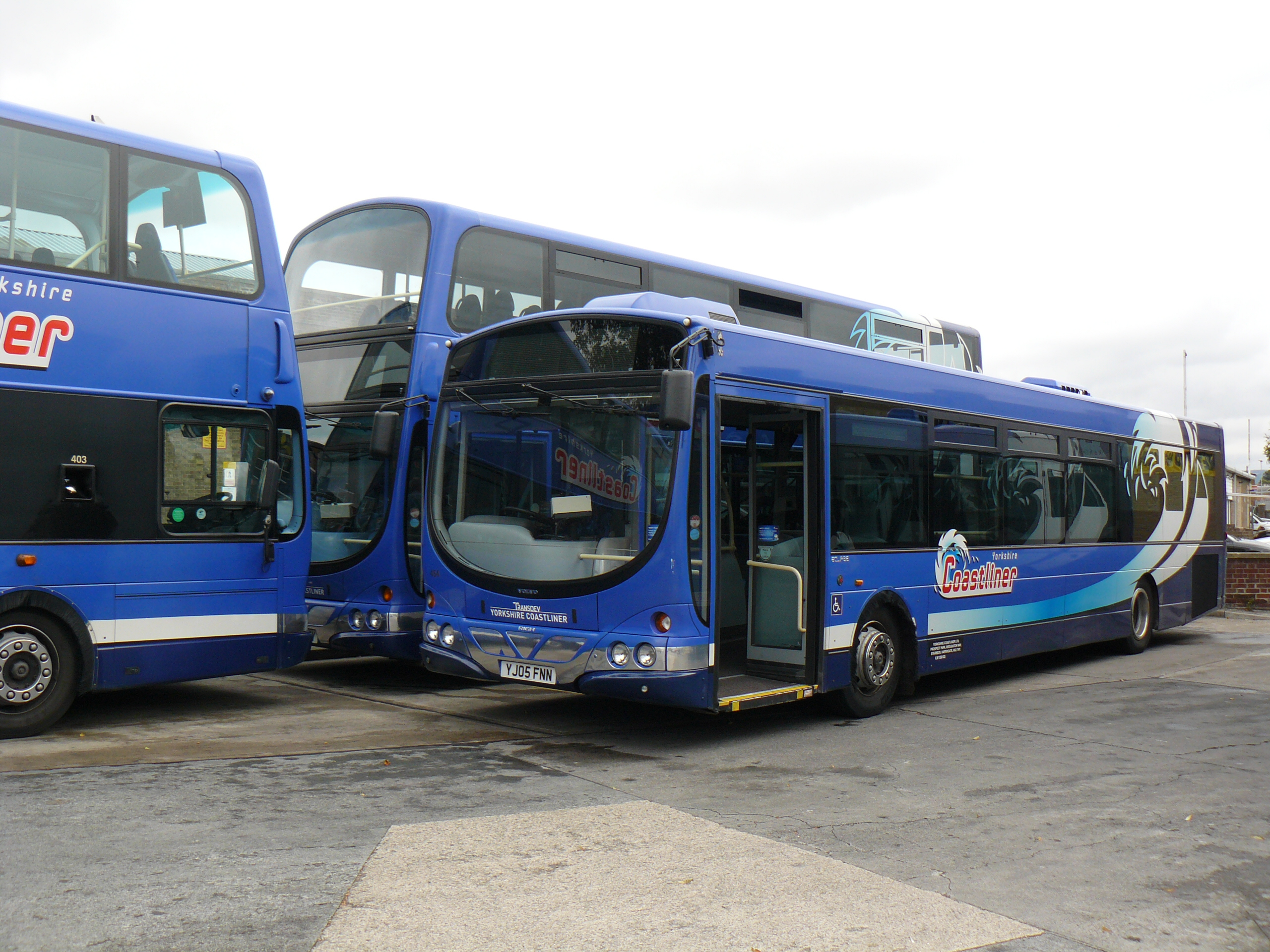
A Wright Eclipse Urban bodied Volvo B7RLE in Malton, in September 2007

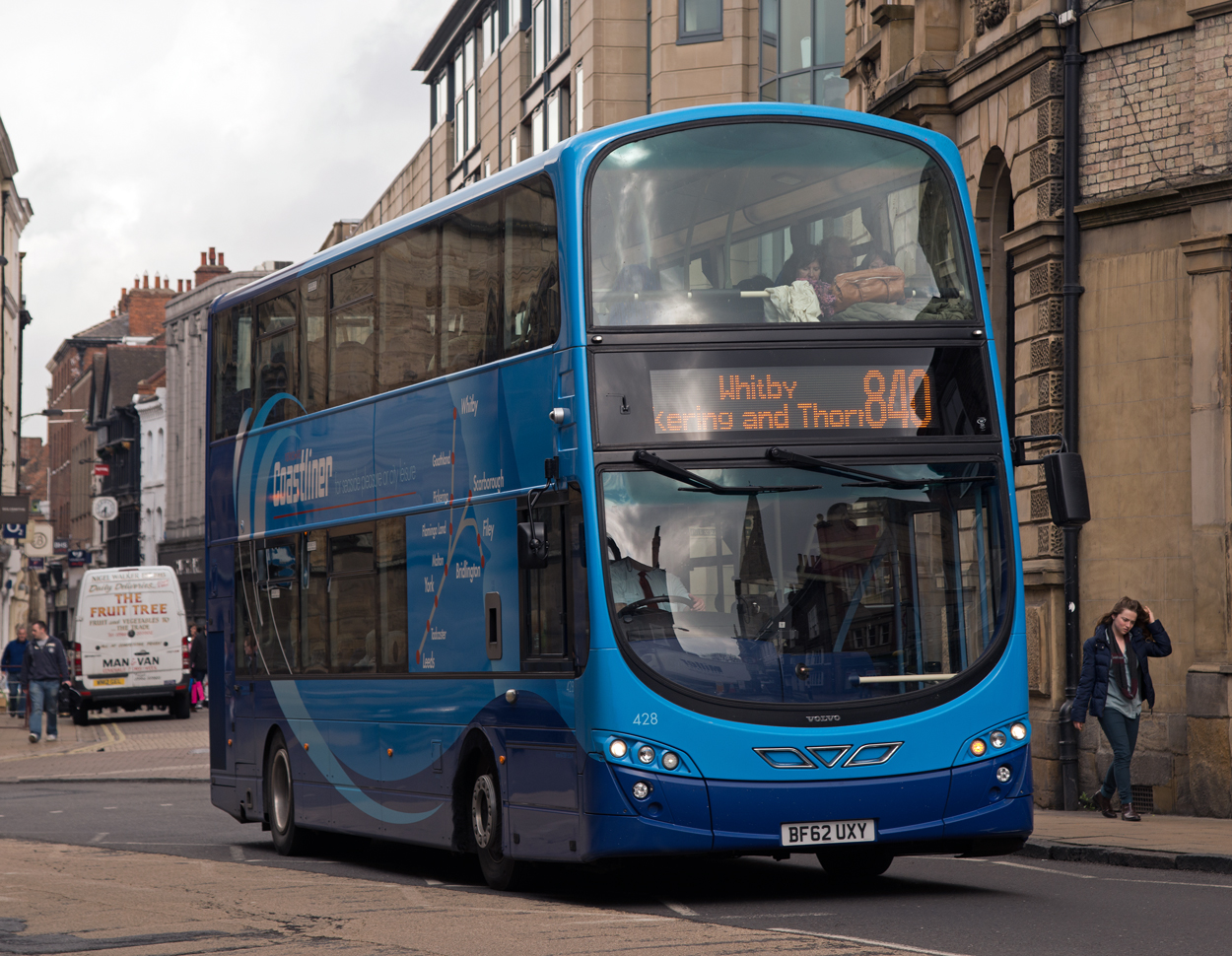
A Wright Eclipse Gemini 2 bodied Volvo B9TL in York, operating service 840 in April 2014

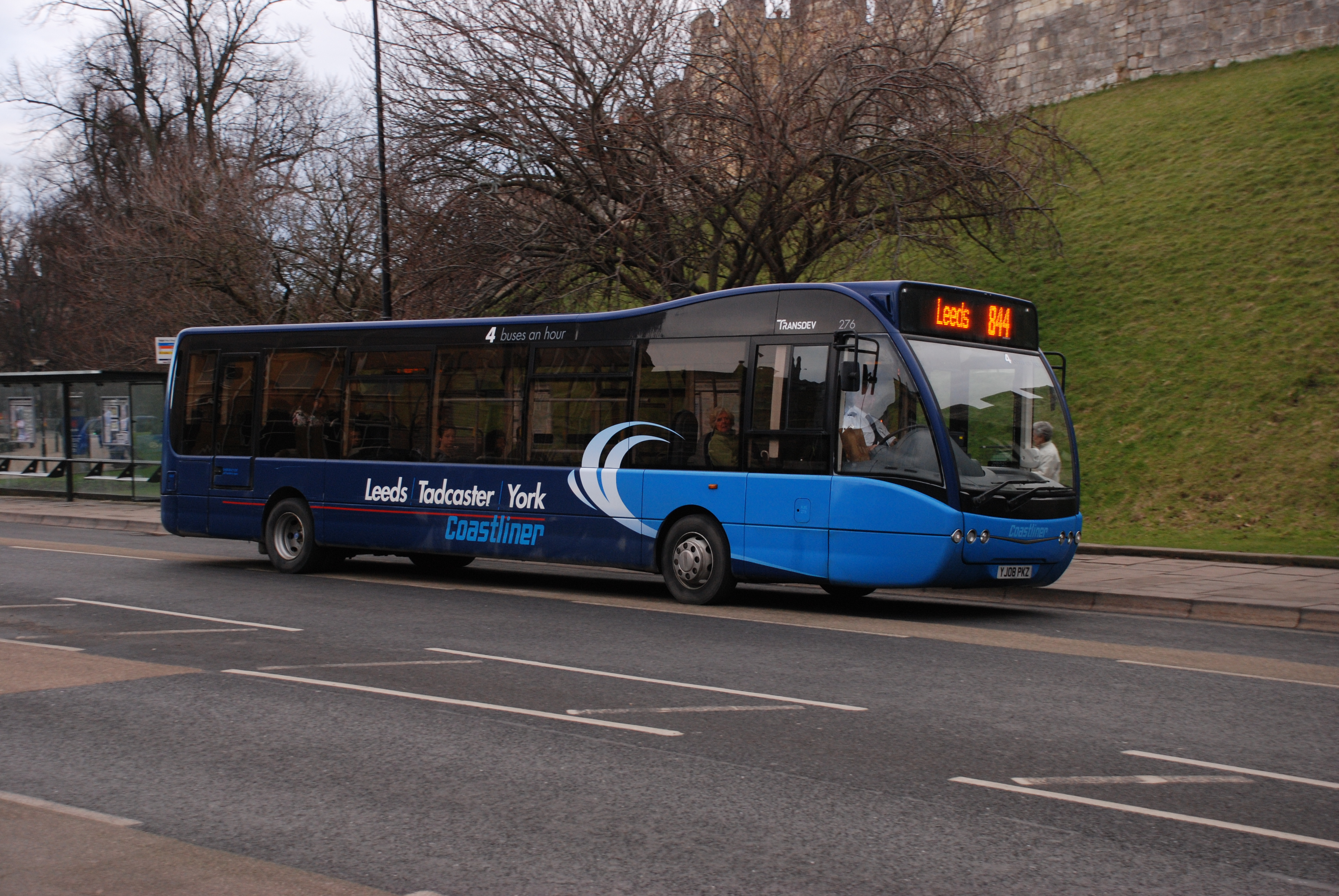
An Optare Versa in York, operating service 844 in February 2011
