= Levisham =

Village and civil parish in North Yorkshire, England

Coordinates: 54.303840°N 0.720930°W

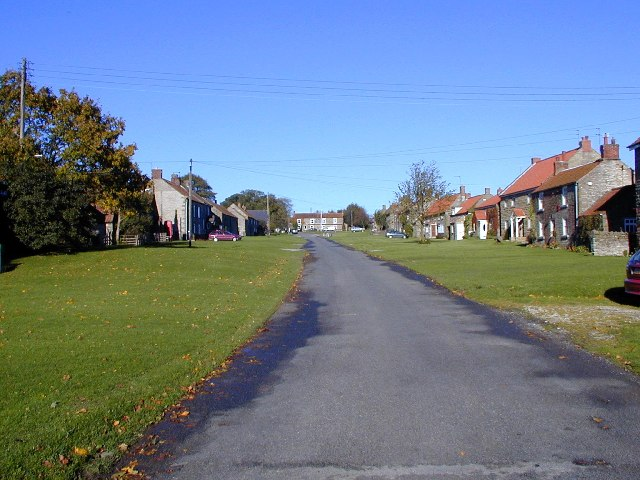

- Location within North Yorkshire
- OS grid reference: SE833905
- Civil parish: Levisham
- Unitary authority: North Yorkshire
- Ceremonial county: North Yorkshire
- Region: Yorkshire and the Humber
- Country: England
- Sovereign state: United Kingdom
- Post town: PICKERING
- Postcode district: YO18
- Police: North Yorkshire
- Fire: North Yorkshire
- Ambulance: Yorkshire
- UK Parliament: Thirsk and Malton

Levisham is a small village and civil parish in North Yorkshire, England, located within the North York Moors National Park about 5 miles (8 km) north of Pickering. Its history dates back to the 11th century.

== History ==
The village is recorded as a very small settlement in the Domesday Book of 1086. The name of the village was first recorded in 1086 as Leuecen, and it derives from Old Norse, meaning the farmstead of Leofgeat's people. The village is believed to have moved location due to the Black Death in the 14th century. The Church of St Mary, a grade II* listed building which dates to the 11th century, is now isolated from the current village, and is thought to mark the site of a deserted medieval village. The church fell into disuse in the 1950s, though burials continue, and the main place of Anglican worship is the Church of St John the Baptist, which is in Levisham village, some 2,600 feet (800 m) away from St Mary's.

From 1974 to 2023 it was part of the district of Ryedale. It is now administered by the unitary North Yorkshire Council.

== Locations ==
It has a station on the North Yorkshire Moors Railway. Nearby villages include Newton-on-Rawcliffe and Lockton. Levisham Estate is owned by the North York Moors National Park Authority. The estate land was purchased between 1975 and 1988, primarily in order to protect the moorland from being ploughed.

In April 2021 the village was used as a filming location for the film Mission: Impossible – Dead Reckoning Part One.

== Demographics ==
At the 2011 census the population was less than 100. Details are included with the civil parish of Lockton. An estimate published by North Yorkshire County Council in 2015 stated that the population was 70.

== People from Levisham ==
Heartbeat actress Lisa Kay (nurse Carol Cassidy) is from Levisham.

== See also ==
- Listed buildings in Levisham
