= Costa Beck =

River in North Yorkshire, England

Coordinates: 54.256°N 0.794°W

Costa Beck is a small river in North Yorkshire, England. It also lends its name to an archaeological site.

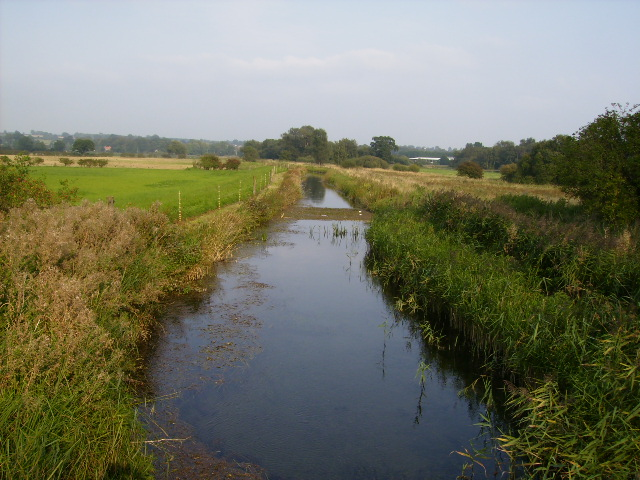
The Costa Beck, near Pickering, North Yorkshire.

== Watercourse ==
The source of Costa Beck is Keld Head Spring 0.5 mi (0.8 km) west of Pickering. It is a tributary of the River Rye which joins the River Derwent, eventually flowing into the River Ouse at Barmby on the Marsh. Costa Beck was used for ship transport by mills as early as 1200. It is a Scandinavian name meaning a river full of fish or full of life.

The waters of Costa Beck are noted for their crystal-clarity, and fly fishing is popular and available via Pickering Fishery Association. Trout, dace, grayling, salmon, and pike can all be found in Costa Beck and kingfishers can be seen flying above. The river further downstream lies adjacent to Flamingo Land Theme Park and Zoo, where visitors occasionally come from to fish.

== Legal action taken to save the Upper Costa Waterbody ==
Following many years of pollution the fish numbers dropped to alarming levels. After decades of fighting to get the EA to help to protect and restore the beck's fortunes the Pickering Fishery Association approached Fish Legal. In early 2023 the Pickering Fishery Association were granted a Judicial Review which was put before Justice Lievens. In essence the case revolved around the legality of the decision by the then Secretary of State Theresa Coffey MP when signing the River Basin Management Plan (RBMP). The EA had been named as an interested party. In November 2023 she handed down the ruling in favour of the Claimant in that the signing of the RBMP was unlawful. Basically it did not look at the Water Framework Directive correctly and tried to view catchments or national requirements as opposed to the Environment Objectives at the Waterbody level.

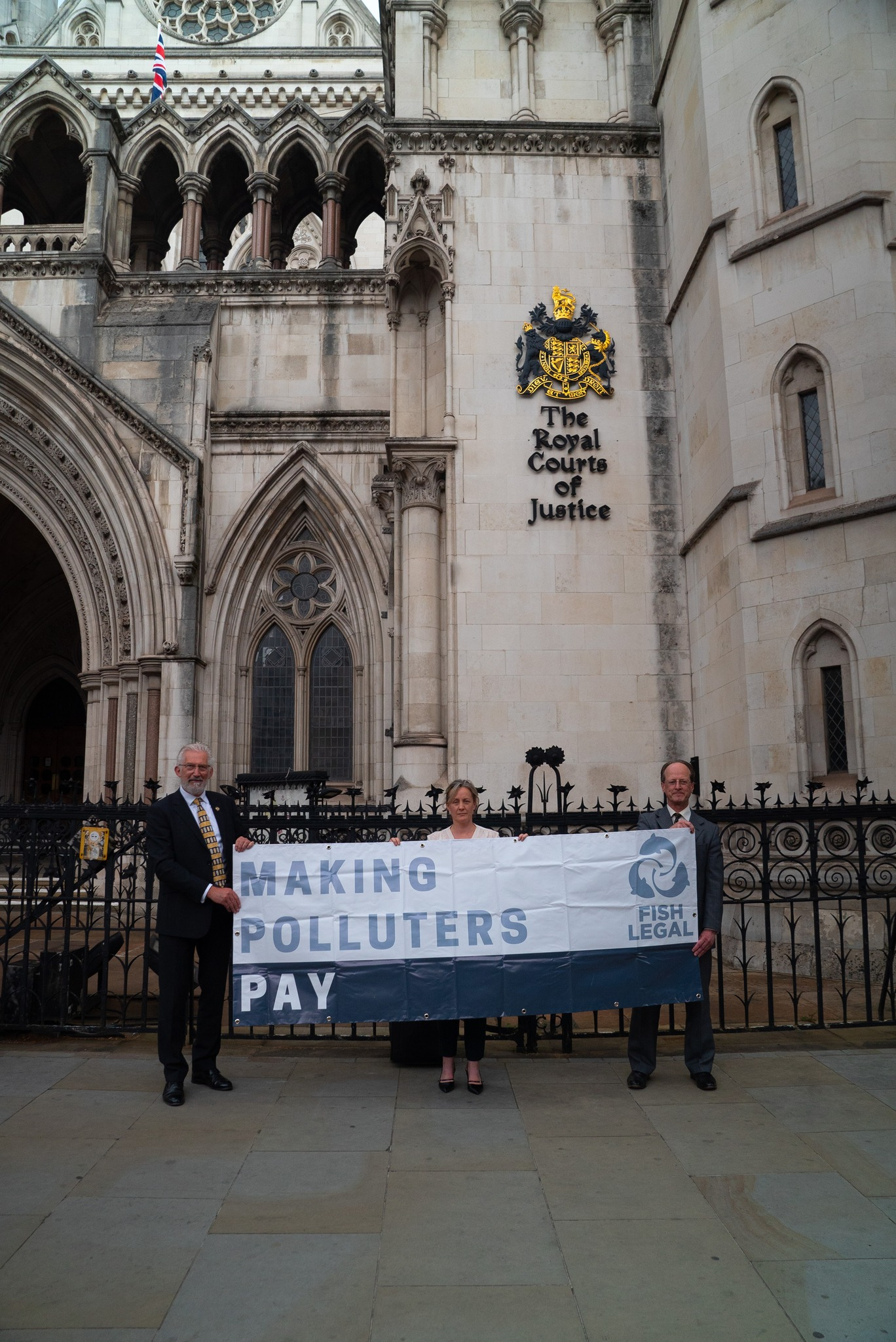
Fish Legal Practice Manager & Solicitor with Pickering Fishery Association Secretary

Following the Labour Party election win, Steve Reed MP became Secretary of State EFRA and continued the fight by going ahead with an Appeal. This was subsequently lost and he decided not to contest the Second JR requested by and granted to Fish Legal on behalf of the PFA. As a result of the Appeal being lost, basically upholding the original ruling of Dame Lievens, and the JR not being contested, a Form of Consent was agreed between the parties. This Form of Consent was subsequently put before Justice Mould who created the Consent Order requiring the EA to carry out a public consultation which would inform a revised Programme of Measures and update the Humber River Basin Management Plan in so far as it concerns the UCB (Upper Costa Waterbody).

The Secretary of State was to have reviewed and signed the new HRBMP and hte Programme of Measures for the UCB but has just asked for a 9 week delay. The Pickering Fishery Association has agreed to this further delay and naturally expects the results to be sufficient to ensure the full recovery of their fisheries in Oxfolds and Costa Becks.

== Archaeological site ==
John Kirk undertook excavations at the Costa Beck between 1925 and 1929 – these excavations were published by Mary Kitson Clark in 1931. The excavations showed the presence of an Iron Age and Romano-British lakeside settlement.
