= Lockton =

Village and civil parish in North Yorkshire, England

Coordinates: 54°17′54″N 0°42′27″W

- Location within North Yorkshire
- Population: 332 (Including Levisham 2011 census)
- OS grid reference: SE843899
- Civil parish: Lockton
- Unitary authority: North Yorkshire
- Ceremonial county: North Yorkshire
- Region: Yorkshire and the Humber
- Country: England
- Sovereign state: United Kingdom
- Post town: PICKERING
- Postcode district: YO18
- Police: North Yorkshire
- Fire: North Yorkshire
- Ambulance: Yorkshire
- UK Parliament: Thirsk and Malton

Lockton is a small village and civil parish in North Yorkshire, England. It is situated in the North York Moors about 4 miles (6.4 km) north-east of Pickering. Nearby villages include Newton-on-Rawcliffe and Levisham. The village is often used as a base by tourists visiting the nearby Dalby Forest, and Yorkshire Life magazine refers to the area as Yorkshire's "Capital of Cake".

== History ==
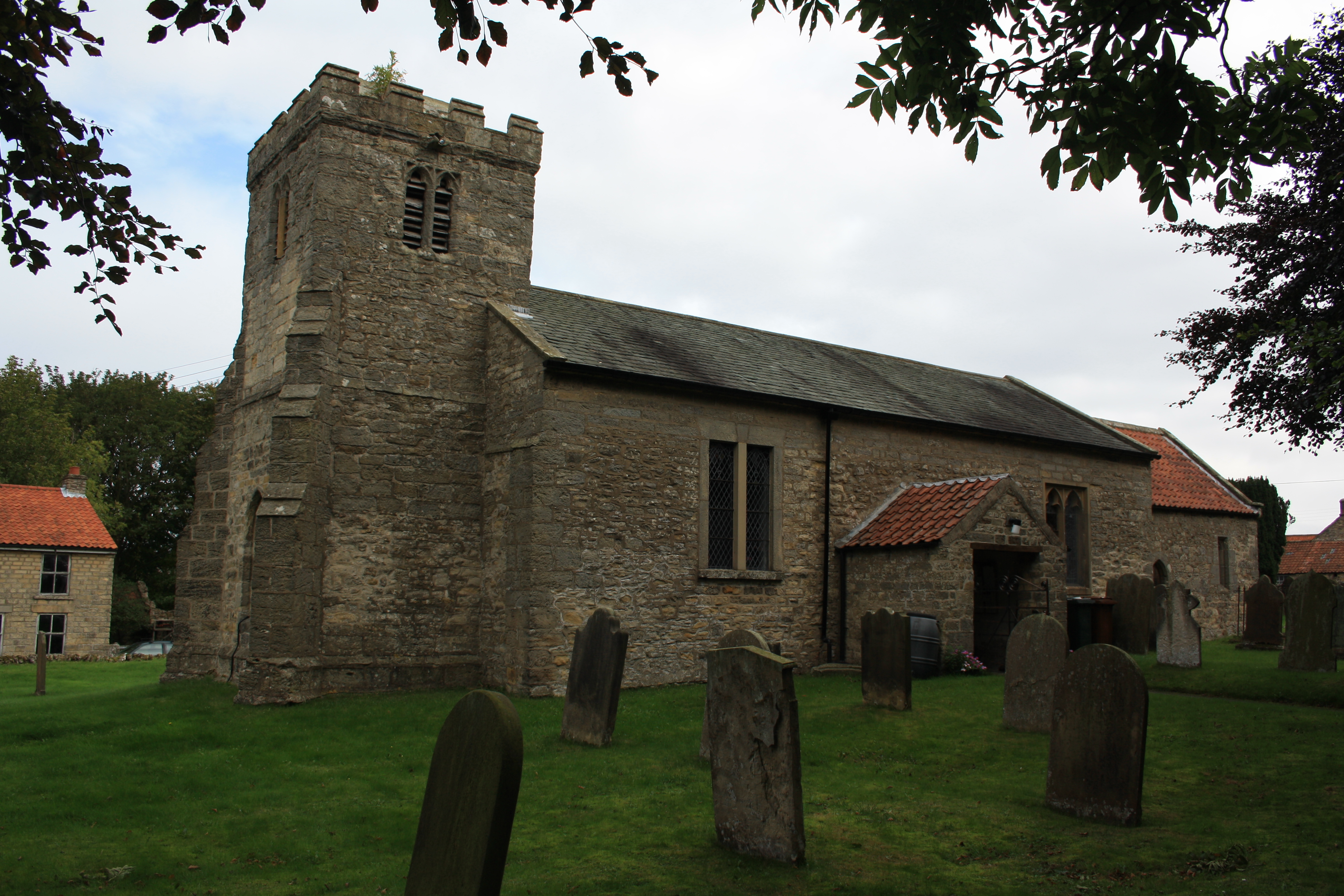
The 15th century tower of St Giles, Lockton

The village is mentioned in the Domesday Book as Lochetun, which is believed to have derived from the Old English of loca tūn, meaning the enclosure of Loca's people.

St Giles' Church dates back to the 13th century (nave and chancel) with a 15th-century tower. The structure is now grade II* listed.

In 1961, a Royal Observer Corps watching post with associated bunker was opened up just to the south of the village. It was closed down seven years later in 1968, but the above ground vents and access structures can still be seen.

According to the 2001 UK census, Lockton parish had a population of 265, increasing to 332 at the 2011 Census. The population tally includes that of nearby Levisham; about 200 people live in Lockton.

Between 1974 and 2023 the village was part of the Ryedale district. It is now administered by North Yorkshire Council.

== See also ==
- Listed buildings in Lockton
