= The Rose Inn =

Pub in Pickering, North Yorkshire, England

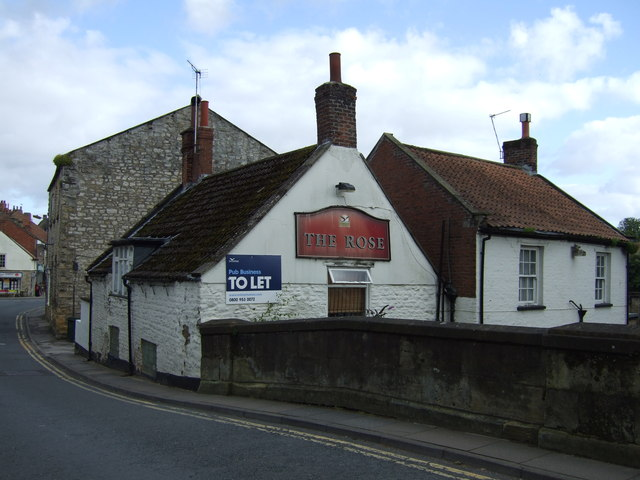
The pub, in 2012

The Rose Inn is a historic pub in Pickering, North Yorkshire, a town in England.

The pub lies by Pickering Bridge and the Pickering Beck. It was originally a cruck framed house, probably built in the 17th century. A wing by the river was added in about 1800. The pub was grade II listed in 1974. The top floor of the pub was gutted by a fire in 1995. The pub has flooded on several occasions, the worst being in 2007 when there was 4 feet (1.2 m) of water in the bar. In 2018, the pub was auctioned with a guide price of £210,000, at which time it was operated by a company named Trickswitch.

The original part of the pub is built of painted stone, and has a pantile roof with a coped gable. The Bridge Street front has one storey and contains a hemi-dormer, and the gable end has windows with modern glazing. The wing to the south is later, and in brick with a dentilled eaves cornice, and a pantile roof with stone coped gables and kneelers, and it contains sash windows. Inside, traces of the cruck remain.

== See also ==
- Listed buildings in Pickering, North Yorkshire
