= Pickering Methodist Church =

Church in Pickering, North Yorkshire, England

Coordinates: 54.2462°N 0.7809°W

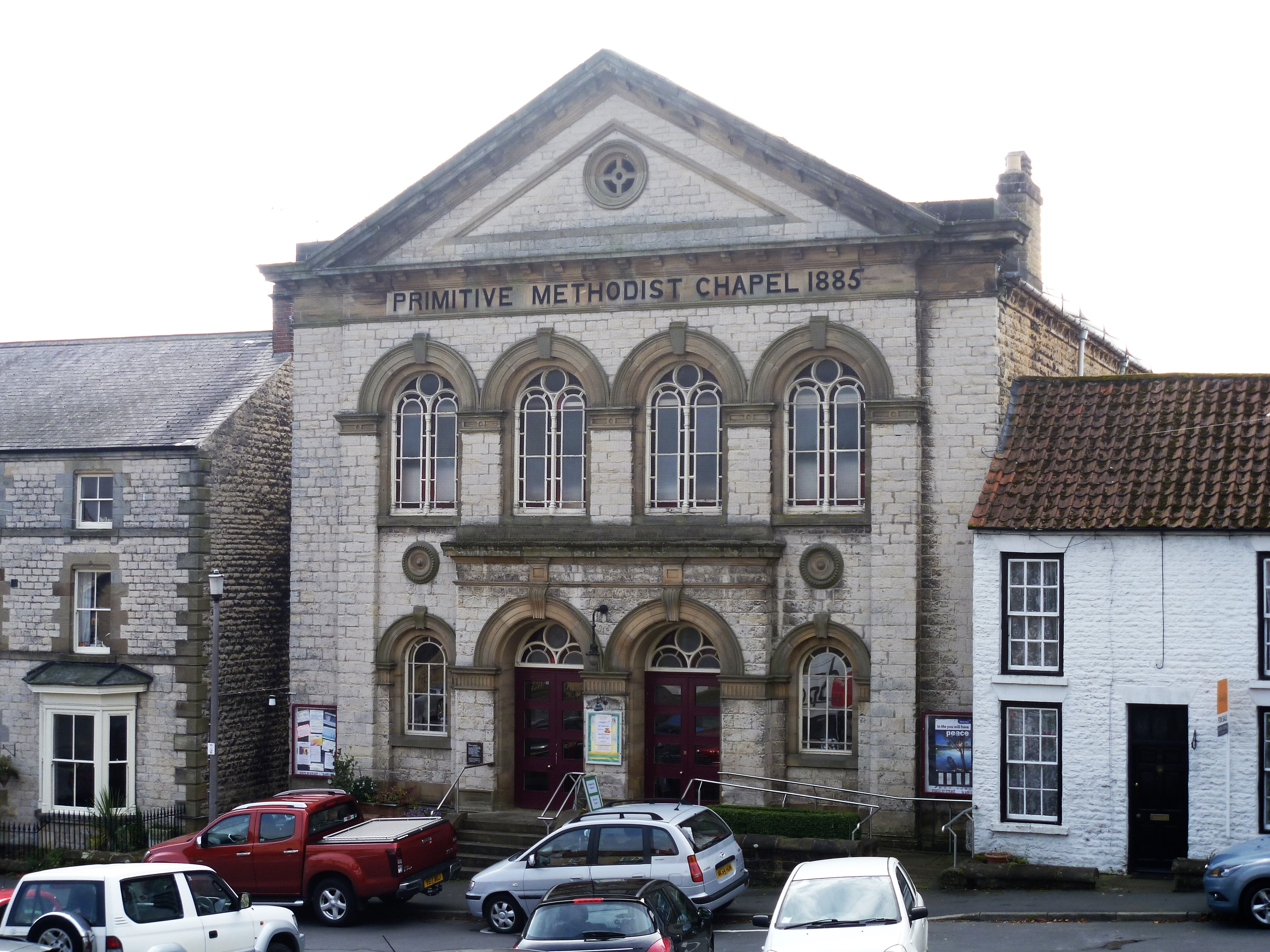
The church, in 2017

Pickering Methodist Church is a historic Methodist chapel in Pickering, North Yorkshire, a town in England.

In 1885, both the Primitive Methodist Church and the Wesleyan Methodist Church opened chapels in Pickering. The Primitive chapel is in the Italianate style, and was designed by Thomas Howdill. Its construction cost £3,500, partly offset by selling the old chapel on Bridge Street to a railway company. The new building could seat 550 worshippers, while its Sunday school could accommodate 400 children. Both the Primitive and Wesleyan Methodists eventually became part of the Methodist Church of Great Britain, which maintains the former Primitive chapel as its church in the town. The building was grade II listed in 1975.

The church is built of stone, and has two storeys facing the road, with a pediment containing a circular window, and a lettered and dated band below. On the front are four bays and pilasters. The ground floor contains paired central doorways with decorated fanlights flanked by round-headed windows, all with impost bands and keystones. On the upper floor are four round-headed windows, also with impost bands and keystones. Inside, there is a large gallery, unusual curved pews, and a brass war memorial commemorating both world wars.

== See also ==
- Listed buildings in Pickering, North Yorkshire
