= The White Swan Inn, Pickering =

Pub in Pickering, North Yorkshire, England

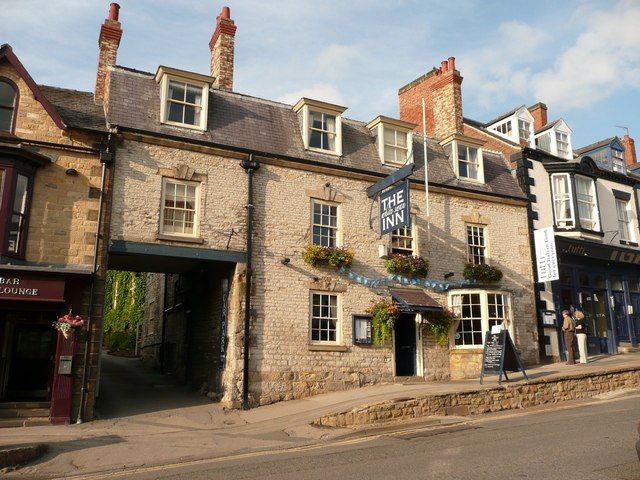
The pub, in 2009

The White Swan Inn is a historic pub in Pickering, North Yorkshire, a town in England.

The pub was built in the 18th century, on the site of a Mediaeval building, of which some passages and a door survive in the basement. It was extended to the rear in the 19th century. The building was grade II listed in 1975. It has a small bar, a lounge, dining room, and 21 bedrooms. It was first listed in the Good Food Guide in 2010.

The pub is built of stone on a plinth, in brick on the side, and has a mansard roof in Welsh slate. It has two storeys and attics, and four bays. The left bay contains a flat-arched carriage entry, on the right bay is a bow window with a moulded cornice, and to its left is a doorway. The other bay, and those on the upper floor, contain sash windows with triple keystones, and on the attics are four dormers.

== See also ==
- Listed buildings in Pickering, North Yorkshire
