= Pickering Quaker Meeting House =

Building in Pickering, North Yorkshire, England

Coordinates: 54°14′55″N 0°46′37″W

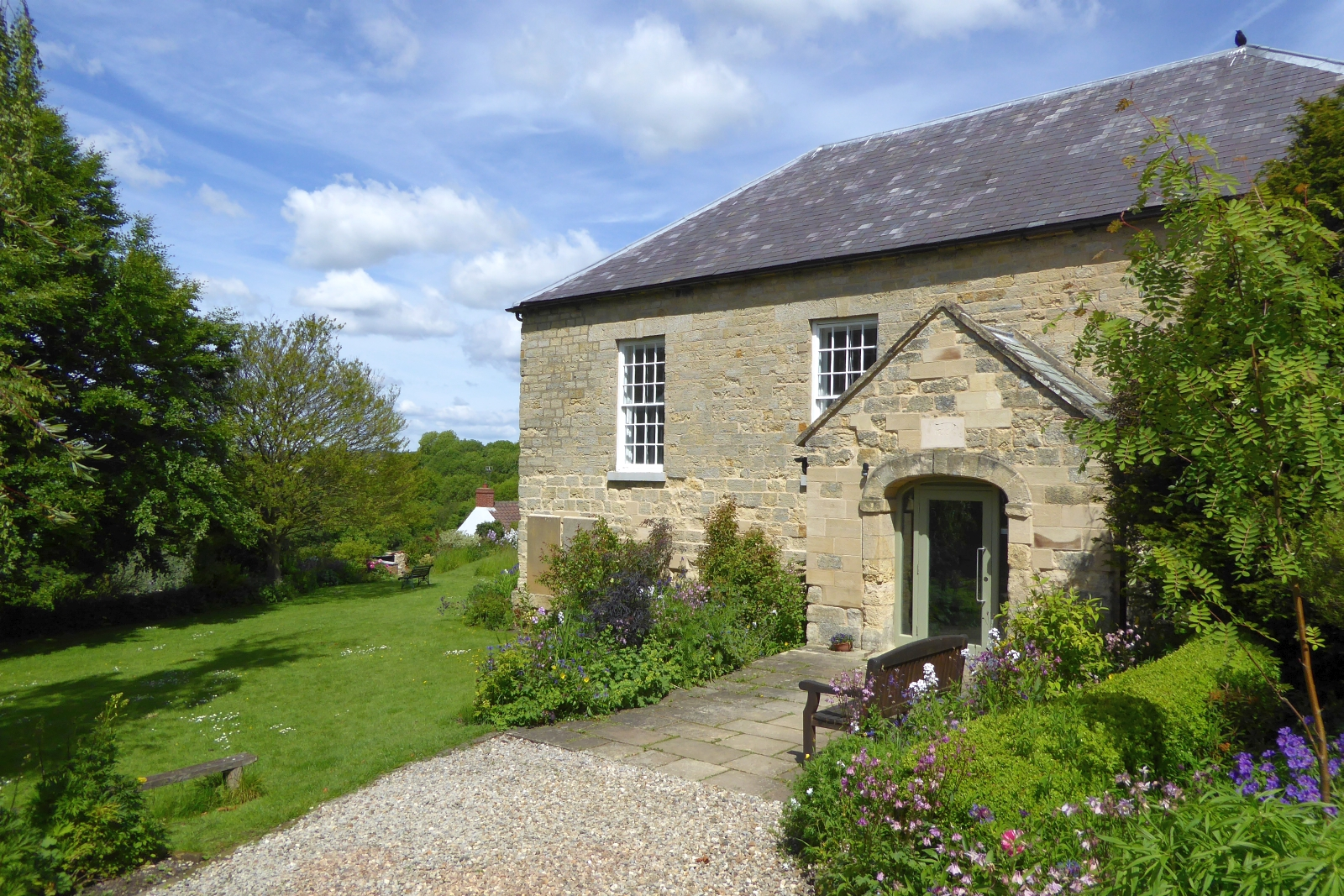
The building, in 2016

Pickering Quaker Meeting House is a historic building in Pickering, North Yorkshire, a town in England.

A Quaker meeting house was first built in Pickering in about 1675, on a site on Undercliff. In 1793, a new, larger, meeting house was built on a site above Undercliff. Meetings ended in 1843, but the building remained in Quaker ownership, and it was refurbished in 1879. Meetings restarted in 1936. In 1945, cloakrooms were added, and a wooden hut from Pickering Golf Club was erected next to the meeting house, to serve as a hostel, but was later demolished. In 1976, an extension was added to house a kitchen, which was later enlarged. The building has been grade II listed since 1974.

The building is built of stone with a hipped Welsh slate roof. There is one storey, a rectangular plan, and three bays. The porch has a coped gable and an elliptical-headed entrance with a keystone and impost blocks. The windows are sashes with flat lintels and incised keystones. Inside, there are larger and smaller meeting rooms separated by a passage, the passage and smaller meeting room with fittings from 1879, and the larger meeting room with fittings from the late 20th century, and a gallery which can be accessed only by a ladder.

== See also ==
- Listed buildings in Pickering, North Yorkshire
