= Listed buildings in Pickering, North Yorkshire =

Pickering is a civil parish in the county of North Yorkshire, England. It contains over 250 listed buildings that are recorded in the National Heritage List for England. Of these, one is listed at Grade I, the highest of the three grades, one is at Grade II*, the middle grade, and the others are at Grade II, the lowest grade. The parish contains the market town of Pickering and the surrounding countryside. Most of the listed buildings in the town are houses, cottages and associated structures, shops and offices, and in the countryside most are farmhouses and farm buildings. The other listed buildings include churches, hotels and public houses, bridges, mills, a railway station and a signal box, and a telephone kiosk.

== Key ==
Grade	Criteria
I	Buildings of exceptional interest, sometimes considered to be internationally important
II*	Particularly important buildings of more than special interest
II	Buildings of national importance and special interest

== Buildings ==
Name and location	Photograph	Date	Notes	Grade
St Peter and St Paul's Church; 54.24574°N 0.77566°W		12th century	The church has been altered and extended through the centuries, including a restoration by J. S. Crowther in 1879. It consists of a nave with a clerestory, north and south aisles, a south porch, north and south transepts, a chancel and a west steeple. The steeple consists of a tower with clasping buttresses, and a spire recessed behind an embattled parapet. Inside the church is a series of 15th-century wall paintings.	I
White Horse Cottage; 54.24625°N 0.77663°W		Late 14th century (possible)	At one time the White Horse Inn, it is in stone, partly painted, with quoins on the left, a pantile roof. There are two storeys and four bays. On the front are two doorways, and the windows are casements.	II
Pickering Bridge; 54.24659°N 0.77966°W		Medieval	The bridge carries Bridge Street over Pickering Beck. It is in stone, with one medieval arch, and the other arches dating from the 18th century. The centre arch is segmental, and the others are flanking flood arches with pilasters between.	II
Former King's Arms Inn; 54.24595°N 0.77583°W	—	Early 17th century (probable)	A longhouse converted into an inn in about 1800, and later divided into two houses. It is in sandstone with some brick, partly rendered, and has pantile roofs with coped gables and kneelers. There are two storeys and most of the windows are sashes.	II
19 Castlegate; 54.24844°N 0.77643°W		17th century (probable)	A cottage in stone with pantile roofs. It is in two parts, the left part with one storey, containing a doorway, and a casement window to the left. In front is a mounting block. The right part is higher, with one storey and attics. On the ground floor are three windows, and above are two modern dormers.	II
Spring View and farm buildings 54.25006°N 0.79241°W	—	17th century (probable)	A longhouse and later farm buildings in stone with pantile roofs. The longhouse faces the road and has two storeys and three bays. It has quoins, on the front are horizontally sliding sash windows, and the entrance is by a porch at the rear. The farm buildings are at the rear, and consist of a two-storey three-bay barn, a stable and cart shed in two storeys and two bays, a single-storey single-bay outbuilding, and a wash house in brick.	II
The Low House; 54.25098°N 0.79337°W		17th century	The house is in stone, and has a pantile roof with coped gables. There are two storeys and three bays, and a rear wing. On the front is a gabled porch and casement windows. To the left is a single-story outbuilding with a window and a carriage entry.	II
The Rose Inn; 54.24645°N 0.77950°W		17th century (probable)	The public house has been extended. The original part is in painted stone, and has a pantile roof with a coped gable. The Bridge Street front has one storey and contains a hemi-dormer, and the gable end has windows with modern glazing. The wing to the south is later, and in brick with a dentilled eaves cornice, and a pantile roof with stone coped gables and kneelers, and it contains sash windows.	II
The Vicarage; 54.24609°N 0.77440°W		17th century	The vicarage, which was refronted in the 19th century, is in stone, with rusticated quoins, a partial moulded string course, and a pantile roof with coped gables and kneelers. There are two storeys and attics, and a front of five bays. On the front is a gabled porch and two bay windows, one rectangular and the other canted. The windows are mullioned and transomed.	II
12 Birdgate; 54.24542°N 0.77605°W		17th to early 18th century	A shop in stone with a pantile roof. There are two storeys and two bays. The ground floor contains a shopfront on the left and a small window to the right, and on the upper floor are two sash windows.	II
16 Castlegate; 54.24875°N 0.77634°W	—	17th or early 18th century	The cottage is in stone, and has a pantile roof with a stone coped gable and kneeler on the left. There are two storeys and three bays. The doorway is in the left bay, and the windows are modern. The ground floor openings have stone lintels.	II
17 and 18 Castlegate; 54.24864°N 0.77638°W		17th or early 18th century	Two cottages in painted stone with a pantile roof and two storeys. On the front are two doorways, the right with a lintel and a keystone. The windows are a mix; some are modern, and the others are horizontally-sliding sashes.	II
12 Burgate; 54.24646°N 0.77638°W	—	Early 18th century	The house is in painted brick on a plinth, with rusticated quoins, a floor band, and a pantile roof with a stone coped gable and kneeler on the right. There are two storeys and three bays. Steps with iron railings lead up to the central doorway that has pilasters, a rectangular fanlight, and a hood on brackets, flanked by canted bay windows. The upper floor contains sash windows, the middle one blind, all with keystones.	II
15 Burgate; 54.24673°N 0.77634°W	—	Early 18th century (or before)	The house is in stone on a rendered plinth, with a coved eaves cornice and a pantile roof. There are two storeys and three bays. The central doorway has pilasters, and a pediment with decoration in the tympanum. The windows are sashes with wedge lintels, and there is a roof dormer.	II
31 Burgate; 54.24653°N 0.77663°W		Early 18th century (or before)	The cottage is in stone on a plinth with a pantile roof. There are two storeys and three bays. The left bay contains a small shopfront, the right bay has a modern door with a rendered lintel, and elsewhere are casement windows. To the left is a full height carriage entry.	II
117 Eastgate; 54.24283°N 0.77308°W	—	Early 18th century	The house is in stone on a plinth, with a moulded eaves cornice, shaped eaves corbels, and a pantile roof with a flat stone verge. There are two storeys and three bays. On the front are two doorways and casement windows, all with rendered lintels.	II
42 Market Place; 54.24556°N 0.77668°W		Early 18th century	A rendered shop that has a pantile roof with stone coped gables and kneelers. There are two storeys and three bays. The ground floor contains two shopfronts with pilasters. On the upper floor is a canted bay window on the right, and to the left are two sash windows with stone surrounds and incised keystones.	II
Ness House and outbuilding 54.24181°N 0.77043°W	—	Early 18th century (or before)	The house is in stone, with rusticated quoins, a moulded eaves cornice, and a Welsh slate roof with coped gables and kneelers. There are two storeys and three bays. The central doorway has a rusticated surround, a rectangular fanlight and a keystone, and to the right is an inset boot scraper. The windows are sashes and have lintels with keystones. To the right is a single-storey outbuilding with a pantile roof, a plain doorway and a carriage doorway.	II
4–9 Birdgate; 54.24539°N 0.77586°W		18th century	A row of shops in brick, partly painted, with rusticated quoins, floor bands, and a pantile roof. There are three storeys and six bays. The ground floor contains three shopfronts, over which is a continuous moulded dentilled cornice. The upper floor windows have keystones, and most are casements.	II
14–17 Birdgate; 54.24540°N 0.77633°W	—	18th century	A row of four shops in painted brick with a pantile roof. There are two storeys and five bays. On the ground floor are four shopfronts, and the upper floor contains five sash windows.	II
19 Birdgate; 54.24520°N 0.77589°W	—	18th century	A shop and an office on a corner site in stone with a pantile roof. There are two storeys and an attic, three bays on the front, and one on the left return. The ground floor contains two shopfronts, one from the 19th-century, and the other from the 20th-century. The windows on the upper floor and attic are sashes.	II
5 Bridge Street; 54.24652°N 0.77900°W	—	18th century	The house is in stone, with rusticated quoins, a moulded cornice, and a pantile roof with a coped gable. There are three storeys and two bays. In the centre is a doorway, to its left is a canted bay window, and the other windows are horizontally-sliding sashes. The windows and doorway have lintels with keystones.	II
6 and 7 Bridge Street; 54.24656°N 0.77914°W		18th century	Two shops in stone with a pantile roof and two storeys. The right shop has two bays, and on the upper floor are two sash windows with lintels and keystones. On the ground floor is a 19th-century shopfront that has a central doorway with a fanlight, and to the left is a round-arched doorway with an armorial shield above. The left shop has one bay, a shop window with a cornice, and a doorway to the right with a blocked fanlight. Above is an eight-light mullioned and transomed window, and a large modern dormer.	II
6, 6A and 7–9 Burgate; 54.24613°N 0.77640°W	—	18th century	A row of cottages in stone on a partial plinth, with a pantile roof and stone coped gables. Most of the windows are sashes, and No. 7 has two dormers. No. 6A has one bay, and steps with railings leading up to a doorway with a hood on brackets. No. 7 has two bays, and a doorway with a rectangular fanlight. The other two cottages have one bay each. No. 8 has a doorway with a decorative surround, and the doorway of No. 9 has pilasters, a decorated blind fanlight, a cornice on brackets, and a shop window to the left.	II
30 Burgate; 54.24663°N 0.77664°W	—	18th century	The house is in stone on a rendered plinth, with rusticated quoins, and a pantile roof with stone coped gables and kneelers. There are two storeys and three bays. The central doorway has a rectangular fanlight, the windows are sashes, and all the openings have wedge lintels with keystones.	II
32 Burgate; 54.24642°N 0.77663°W		18th century	The house is in stone on a plinth, with rusticated quoins, a moulded cornice and a blocking course, and a slate roof. There are two storeys and three bays. The doorway has pilasters, a rectangular fanlight, and a moulded cornice on brackets. The windows are sashes with stone surrounds and rusticated keystones.	II
36 Burgate; 54.24613°N 0.77661°W	—	18th century	The house is in red brick with rusticated stone quoins and a pantile roof. There are two storeys and an attic, and two bays. The left bay contains a doorway with a rectangular fanlight, above it is a sash window, and both have wedge lintels. On the right bay is a shop window with pilasters, above which is a canted bay window, and on the roof are two dormers.	II
41, 42 and 43 Burgate; 54.24586°N 0.77668°W		18th century	The building, on a corner site, is in stone and has a pantile roof with a stone coped gable and kneeler on the corner. There are two storeys and three bays on Burgate. The left return, on Market Place, has a shop window and a casement window above, and there is a door on the corner. On Burgate, the left bay has a shop window, above which is an oriel half-dormer with applied timber framing. To the right is a doorway with pilasters, and a small window above. Further to the right is a modern shopfront, over which is an oriel window with applied timber framing, and there is a passage doorway to the right.	II
1 Castlegate; 54.24732°N 0.77626°W		18th century	The cottage is in painted stone and has a pantile roof with stone coped gables and kneelers. There are two storeys and two bays. The central doorway has a lintel with a keystone, and to its left is a shop window. To the right is a sash window with a lintel and keystone, and on the upper floor are two sash windows.	II
2 Castlegate; 54.24740°N 0.77624°W	—	18th century	The cottage is in stone with a pantile roof. There are two storeys and two bays. The doorway, on the left, has pilasters, a rectangular fanlight and a cornice. The windows are horizontally-sliding sashes, those on the ground floor with lintels and incised keystones.	II
14, 14A and 15 Castlegate; 54.24888°N 0.77631°W	—	18th century	A row of three cottages in stone, with a pantile roof, and a stone coped gable and kneeler on the left. There are two storeys and three bays. Each cottage has a doorway on the left, and a horizontally-sliding sash window in each floor to the right.	II
24 Castlegate; 54.24746°N 0.77652°W	—	18th century	The house is in stone on a plinth, and has a pantile roof. There are two storeys and two bays. The ground floor contains a doorway on the left and a canted bay window to the right, and on the upper floor are two horizontally-sliding sash windows.	II
5 Eastgate; 54.24368°N 0.77407°W		18th century	A shop in stone with a pantile roof, hipped towards the road, and with a coped gable and kneeler. There are two storeys and three bays. The ground floor contains a 19th-century shopfront and fascia, and on the upper floor are three sash windows.	II
18 Eastgate; 54.24345°N 0.77358°W	—	18th century	Two cottages, later used for other purposes, in rendered stone, with a pantile roof, and coped gables with kneelers. There are two storeys and three bays. In the centre is a segmental-arched carriage entry, to its left is a shopfront, and to the right is a bow window and a doorway. The upper floor contains three casement windows, and on the roof are two dormers, the left with a flat roof, and the right gabled.	II
20 Eastgate; 54.24334°N 0.77346°W	—	18th century	The house is in stone, and has a pantile roof with a coped gable and kneeler on the left. There are two storeys and attics, and three bays. Steps lead up to the central doorway that has pilasters, a round-arched fanlight, and a cornice on carved consoles. This is flanked by canted bay windows, the upper floor contains sash windows with wedge lintels, and in the attics are three gabled dormers.	II
21 and 22 Eastgate; 54.24327°N 0.77330°W	—	18th century	Two houses in stone, with rusticated quoins, and pantile roofs with coped gables and kneelers. Both houses have three storeys. The larger house to the left has two bays, a central doorway with pilasters, a rectangular fanlight, and a cornice on consoles. The windows on the lower two floors are sashes, and on the top floor are casement windows. The house to the right is lower, with one bay, and it contains a doorway with a plain surround, and modern windows.	II
31 Eastgate; 54.24302°N 0.77270°W	—	18th century	The cottage is in stone with a pantile roof. There are two storeys and one bay, and the gable end faces the road. On the front is a doorway and a window in each floor.	II
60 and 61 Eastgate; 54.24206°N 0.77014°W	—	18th century	A pair of cottages in stone with a pantile roof. There are two storeys and three bays. On the front are two doorways, and the windows are horizontally-sliding sashes.	II
66 and 67 Eastgate; 54.24194°N 0.76976°W	—	18th century	A pair of cottages in stone with a pantile roof. There are two storeys and two bays. The doorways are in the outer parts of each cottage, and the windows are horizontally-sliding sashes.	II
115 and 116 Eastgate; 54.24277°N 0.77291°W	—	18th century	Two houses in stone with a pantile roof. There are two storeys and three bays. The left house has a modern window with mullions and transoms above which is a semi-dormer, and to the left is a doorway. The right house has a doorway, with horizontally-sliding sash windows to the left, and a flat-headed carriage entry to the right.	II
119 and 120 Eastgate; 54.24303°N 0.77354°W	—	18th century	A pair of cottages in stone, with a pantile roof and a coped gable and kneeler on the right. There are two storeys and three bays. On the ground floor are two doorways and three bow windows, and on the upper floor are three half-dormers breaking the eaves.	II
121 Eastgate; 54.24309°N 0.77367°W	—	18th century	The cottage is in stone with a pantile roof. There is one storey and attics, and two bays. The doorway is on the left, and the windows are modern, those in the attics breaking the eaves.	II
122 Eastgate; 54.24313°N 0.77377°W	—	18th century	The cottage is in stone with a pantile roof. There is one storey and attics, and two bays. The central doorway is flanked by bow windows, and in the attic are modern semi-dormers.	II
123 and 124 Eastgate; 54.24319°N 0.77390°W	—	18th century	Two houses in stone, with a pantile roof and coped gables and kneelers. There are two storeys and attics, and three bays. On the front are two doorways, the windows are modern, and in the attic are two flat-roofed dormers.	II
125 Eastgate; 54.24324°N 0.77403°W	—	18th century	The cottage is in stone with a pantile roof. There are two storeys and two bays. The left bay contains a doorway, and a modern window to the right and above, and on the roof is a flat-roofed dormer. On the right bay is a flat-headed carriage entry, and a window above.	II
133 Eastgate; 54.24373°N 0.77496°W	—	18th century	A cottage, later an office, in stone, with a pantile roof, coped gables and kneelers. There are two storeys and two bays. On the ground floor is a doorway and a bow window to the right, and the upper floor contains two modern windows. To the left is a single-story extension with a doorway and a garage door.	II
19 Hall Garth; 54.24540°N 0.77463°W	—	18th century	The house is in stone on a plinth, with rusticated quoins, and a pantile roof with coped gables. There are three storeys and four bays. The doorway in the third bay has a fanlight, and there is a passage doorway on the left. The windows above the main doorway are blocked, and on the lower two floors are sash windows with keystones. The top floor contains a casement window and two modern windows, and all the openings on the lower two floors have wedge lintels.	II
3 Hungate; 54.24435°N 0.77598°W		18th century	The cottage is in stone, with a pantile roof and two storeys. On the ground floor is a bow window, and a doorway with a plain surround to the right. To the left is a garage door, and the upper floor contains two casement windows breaking the eaves.	II
19 Hungate; 54.24454°N 0.77708°W		18th century	The house is in stone, with rusticated quoins, a modillion eaves cornice, and a Welsh slate roof with coped gables and kneelers. There are two storeys and three bays. Steps with a curved iron handrail lead up to the central doorway that has panelled pilasters, a semicircular fanlight, and an open pediment on console brackets. This is flanked by canted bay windows, and the upper floor contains sash windows with keystones. To the right is a lower bay containing a carriage entry with a rusticated elliptical-arched head, with a circular window above. The forecourt is enclosed by a low stone wall.	II
20 Hungate; 54.24466°N 0.77732°W	—	18th century	The house is rendered and has a pantile roof. There are two storeys and an attic, with two bays facing the road. These bays and the gable end on the left return contain sash windows, most with wedge lintels. Recessed to the left of the gable end is a narrow bay containing a doorway with a window above. At right angles is a bay containing a carriage entry with an elliptical-arched head and a blocked fanlight, with a circular window above, and a Welsh slate roof.	II
25 Hungate; 54.24479°N 0.77817°W	—	18th century	The cottage is in stone, with quoins, a moulded eaves course, and a pantile roof with a stone coped gable and kneeler on the right. There are two storeys and four bays. The doorway has a rectangular fanlight, there is a blocked doorway on the left, and most of the windows are sashes.	II
26 and 26A Hungate; 54.24484°N 0.77838°W		18th century	The building, which was refronted in the mid-19th century, is in stone, with vermiculated rusticated quoins, a moulded string course, a moulded eaves cornice, and a parapet. There are two storeys and three bays. In the centre is a doorway with a round rusticated arch, a fanlight, and a carved keystone. This is flanked by canted bay windows, and the upper floor contains sash windows in moulded surrounds.	II
33 Hungate; 54.24494°N 0.77801°W		18th century	The house is in stone on a rendered plinth, and has a pantile roof with a coped gable and kneeler on the left. There are two storeys and two bays. The central doorway has a divided fanlight, and the windows are sashes. All the openings have lintels with incised keystones; the lintel over the ground floor openings is continuous.	II
34 Hungate; 54.24492°N 0.77781°W	—	18th century	The house is in stone, and has a pantile roof with coped gables and kneelers. There are two storeys and four bays. The left bay contains a carriage archway, above which is a casement window. The other windows are sashes, and the central doorway has a divided three-pane fanlight.	II
36 and 37 Hungate; 54.24476°N 0.77690°W	—	18th century	The house is in stone and has a pantile roof with a coped gable and kneeler. There are two storeys, and to the left is a flat-headed carriage entry with a blocked circular window above. On he front are two doorways and sash windows.	II
38 Hungate; 54.24475°N 0.77677°W	—	18th century	The house is in stone, with a moulded eaves cornice, and a pantile roof with coped gables and kneelers. There are two storeys and two bays. The central doorway has a fanlight, and the windows are sashes.	II
43–47 Hungate; 54.24470°N 0.77610°W		18th century	A row of five cottages in stone, with a pantile roof and coped gables and kneelers. There are two storeys and attics, five bays and a flat-headed carriage entry on the left with a blocked window above. On the front are doorways, one with a fanlight, and a mix of windows, some casements, and some modern with mullions and transoms. In the attics are modern dormers.	II
2 and 3 Market Place; 54.24588°N 0.77710°W	—	18th century	A row of shops in painted brick, with rusticated quoins, a modillion eaves cornice on the left and a plain cornice on the right, and a Welsh slate roof. There are two storeys and five bays. The ground floor contains shopfronts, on the upper floor on the left is a canted bay window and four sash windows to the right, and above are four dormers.	II
10 Market Place; 54.24613°N 0.77821°W	—	18th century	A shop, the upper floor rendered, with quoins, and a pantile roof with a coped gable and kneeler on the left. There are two storeys and the main part has two bays. The ground floor contains a modern shopfront, and above are sash windows with wedge lintels. To the left is a carriage entry with a sash window above.	II
20–22 Market Place; 54.24589°N 0.77808°W	—	18th century	A row of stone shops with a pantile roof and a coped gable and kneeler on the left. There are two storeys and five bays. The ground floor contains 19th-century shopfronts, including two bow windows. On the upper floor, in the fourth bay, is a rectangular bay window breaking the eaves, and the other bays contain sash windows.	II
33 and 34 Market Place; 54.24575°N 0.77771°W	—	18th century	The shop is rendered on the front, and has rusticated quoins, and a pantile roof with coped gables. There are two storeys and two bays. The ground floor contains a modern shopfront, and on the upper floor are two sash windows with moulded surrounds.	II
37 Market Place; 54.24565°N 0.77739°W		18th century	The shop is in painted brick, with rusticated quoins, and a pantile roof with a coped gable and kneeler on the right. There are two storeys and an attic, and two bays. The ground floor contains an early 19th-century shopfront that has a central doorway with a rectangular fanlight flanked by bay windows, with a fascia, and a passage doorway to the left. On the upper floor are two sash windows, and in the attic is a dormer.	II
43 and 44 Market Place; 54.24552°N 0.77654°W	—	18th century	Two rendered shops with a pantile roof. There are two storeys and four bays. The ground floor contains two shopfronts, and on the upper floor are four sash windows.	II
45 Market Place; 54.24554°N 0.77622°W	—	18th century	A shop on a corner site, in stone, with rusticated quoins, and a pantile roof with coped gables. There are two storeys, three bays on the front, and three on the right return. On the front is a 19th-century shopfront with pilasters and a fascia. On the right return is a central doorway, and the windows on both fronts are sashes, the window above the doorway blocked.	II
46 Market Place; 54.24563°N 0.77622°W	—	18th century	An office in stone that has a pantile roof with a coped gable and kneeler on the right. There are two storeys and three bays. The ground floor has a shop window to the right and a projecting canted shopfront on the left. On the upper floor are three sash windows.	II
25 Potter Hill; 54.24630°N 0.78133°W	—	18th century	The house is in painted brick on a plinth, with rusticated quoins, a floor band, and a pantile roof with a stone coped gable and kneeler on the left. There are two storeys and three bays. The central doorway has pilasters, a rectangular fanlight, and a cornice on console brackets. This is flanked by canted bay windows, and on the upper floor are sash windows with keystones.	II
27 Potter Hill; 54.24629°N 0.78106°W		18th century	The house is in painted stone with a pantile roof. There are two storeys and two bays. The central doorway has a blocked rectangular fanlight, the windows are sashes, and all the openings have lintels with incised keystones.	II
5, 5A, 6 and 6A Smiddy Hill; 54.24507°N 0.77583°W	—	18th century	A pair of shops with accommodation above, in stone with a pantile roof. There are three storeys and two bays. The ground floor has two shopfronts and a passage doorway to the right, and the upper floors contain sash windows.	II
8 and 8A Smiddy Hill; 54.24490°N 0.77587°W	—	18th century	A shop in stone, the left bay painted, with a pantile roof. There are two storeys and three bays, the left bay narrower. On the left bay is a doorway and a window to the left, and to the right is a 19th-century shopfront with a fascia on brackets. The upper floor contains sash windows.	II
9 Smiddy Hill; 54.24483°N 0.77591°W	—	18th century	The house is rendered, on a plinth, with rusticated quoins, and a pantile roof with stone coped gables and kneelers. There are two storeys and three bays. Steps lead up to the central doorway that has pilasters, a rectangular fanlight, and a paired cornice hood on brackets. The windows are sashes with incised keystones.	II
24 and 25 Under Cliffe; 54.24958°N 0.77773°W	—	18th century	A pair of cottages in stone, with a pantile roof and stone coped gables with kneelers. There are two storeys and four bays, and the gable end faces the street. On the gable end is a doorway with a hood on brackets, and to the left is a modern window in each floor.	II
10 Westgate; 54.24560°N 0.78374°W	—	18th century	The house is in stone on a plinth, with rusticated quoins, and a pantile roof with coped gables and kneelers. There are two storeys and two bays. The central doorway has a rectangular fanlight, and the windows and doorway have stone lintels and keystones.	II
13 and 14 Westgate; 54.24571°N 0.78418°W	—	18th century	A pair of stone houses, the right house rough rendered, with a moulded eaves cornice, and a pantile roof with stone coped gables and kneelers. There are two storeys and each house has three bays. The doorways are in the centre of the houses, and above each is a blocked window. The right house has sash windows, and the windows in the left house are modern. All the openings, except for the right doorway, have lintels with keystones.	II
20–22 Westgate; 54.24594°N 0.78501°W	—	18th century (probable)	A row of three cottages in stone with a pantile roof. There is one storey and attics, and each cottage has one bay and one doorway. The left cottage has a modern ground floor window, the middle cottage a bow window, and the right cottage a casement window. The attic contains three modern dormers.	II
30 and 31 Westgate; 54.24629°N 0.78643°W	—	18th century	Two cottages in stone with pantile roofs. The left cottage has two storeys and two bays, and a single-storey extension to the right. In the centre is a doorway, and there are two windows in each floor, all the openings with lintels and keystones. In the extension is a garage door and a dormer. The right cottage has one storey and an attic, and two bays. It contains a doorway, horizontally-sliding sash windows and two raking dormers.	II
33–36 Westgate; 54.24642°N 0.78682°W	—	18th century	A row of four cottages in stone with a pantile roof and two storeys. Each cottage has a doorway. The windows vary, most are mullioned or mullioned and transomed, and there are three flat-roofed dormers.	II
40 Westgate; 54.24674°N 0.78758°W	—	18th century	A stone cottage with a pantile roof, two storeys and three bays. On the front is a modern door, and the windows are unevenly-spaced horizontally-sliding sashes.	II
82 Westgate; 54.24764°N 0.78893°W	—	18th century	The cottage is in stone with a pantile roof, two storeys and two bays. On the right is a doorway, there is one horizontally-sliding sash window, and the other windows are modern.	II
86 and 86A Westgate; 54.24747°N 0.78856°W	—	18th century	The house is in stone with brick courses at the eaves and a pantile roof. There is one storey and attics, and four bays. On the front is a doorway and a small fire window, the other windows are horizontally-sliding sashes, and there are two flat-roofed dormers.	II
103 Westgate; 54.24684°N 0.78715°W	—	18th century	The house is fendered, and has a stone coped gable end with a kneeler facing the road. There are two storeys and an attic, the gable end has two bays, the left return has three bays, and beyond is a two-storey two-bay extension. The doorway on the right of the gable end has a rectangular fanlight, the two attic windows have round-arched heads, and the other windows have flat heads. Along the left return are a doorway and windows, most of which are sashes.	II
104 and 104A Westgate; 54.24677°N 0.78705°W	—	18th century or earlier	The house is in rendered stone on a plinth and has a pantile roof. There is one storey and attics, and three bays. The ground floor contains three bow windows and a doorway, and above are three half-dormers.	II
105 and 106 Westgate; 54.24674°N 0.78695°W	—	18th century	A pair of houses in stone with a pantile roof. There are two storeys and three bays. The left bay contains a bow window with a doorway to the right, and above is a half-dormer. On the middle bay is a doorway and two casement windows, and the right bay has a carriage entrance with a horizontally-sliding sash window above.	II
107 Westgate; 54.24669°N 0.78684°W	—	18th century	The house is in stone with quoins and a pantile roof. There are two storeys and two bays. The central doorway has a wooden lintel, and the windows are modern with stone lintels.	II
108 Westgate; 54.24659°N 0.78663°W	—	18th century or earlier	The house is in stone on a plinth, and has a pantile roof. There are two storeys and two bays. On the left is a doorway, the ground floor windows are modern with mullions and transoms, and above are two-light casement windows.	II
Black Swan Hotel; 54.24527°N 0.77607°W		18th century or earlier	The public house is in painted stone, and has a pantile roof with stone coped gables and kneelers. There are two storeys and an L-shaped plan, with a main range of three bays, and a projecting cross-wing on the right. The left bay in the main range contains a canted bay window, and a three-light sash window above. The middle bay contains a doorway, and on the upper floor are two sash windows, all with shaped surrounds. The upper window in the cross-wing has a triple keystone, and on the main range are two modern dormers.	II
East Hambleton Farmhouse; 54.27610°N 0.76524°W	—	18th century	The farmhouse is in stone with an eaves cornice and a pantile roof. There are two storeys and four bays. On the front is a doorway and sash windows, one horizontally-sliding.	II
Keld Head Farmhouse (East); 54.25029°N 0.79237°W		18th century	The farmhouse is in stone on a plinth with a pantile roof. There are two storeys and four bays. The doorway has a rectangular fanlight, and the windows are horizontally sliding sashes.	II
Langdale House; 54.24740°N 0.77654°W	—	18th century	The house is in stone on a rendered plinth, with rusticated quoins on the left, and a pantile roof with stone coped gables and kneelers. There are two storeys and three bays. The central doorway has a rectangular fanlight, the windows are sashes, and all the openings have wedge lintels with triple keystones.	II
Mount Farm; 54.24664°N 0.78139°W	—	18th century	The house is in stone, with rusticated quoins, a string course, a moulded eaves cornice, and a pantile roof with stone verges and shaped corbels. There are two storeys and three bays. Steps lead up to the central doorway that has a rectangular fanlight, the windows are sashes, and all the openings have lintels and triple keystones. To the left is an elliptical-headed carriage arch with a rusticated surround, and a small window above.	II
One Oak; 54.24499°N 0.77491°W		18th century	The house, which was refronted in the 19th century, is in stone, with rusticated quoins, a moulded eaves cornice on brackets, and a roof with coped gables and kneelers. There are two storeys and three bays. Steps lead up to the central doorway that has a four-centred arched head, a fanlight with carved lights, and a hood mould, above which is a mullioned and transomed window. The outer bays contain full height canted bay windows, with a moulded cornice, and an embattled parapet, the centre gabled over a shield.	II
Park Gate Farmhouse; 54.26177°N 0.76039°W	—	18th century	The farmhouse is in stone, and has a pantile roof with a kneeler on the left, and two storeys. The doorway has a three-light fanlight, to its left is a shallow canted bay window, and the other windows are sashes.	II
Farmhouse, Scalla Moor Farm; 54.25418°N 0.74605°W	—	18th century	The farmhouse is in stone with a pantile roof. There are two storeys and three bays, and a rear wing. The doorway has a rectangular fanlight, and the windows are sashes.	II
Farm building southeast of Scalla Moor Farm; 54.25403°N 0.74582°W	—	18th century	The outbuilding is in stone with a pantile roof, and has one storey.	II
St George's House; 54.24564°N 0.77717°W	—	18th century	A hotel, later used for other purposes, in stone, with rusticated quoins, and a pantile roof with coped verges and kneelers. There are two storeys and attics, and the gable end faces the street. This contains a bay window on the ground floor flanked by small windows, and on the upper floor and attic are sash windows. On the west front are a floor band, a moulded eaves cornice, and three bays. The windows are sashes, some with lintels and keystones.	II
The Bay Horse Public House; 54.24606°N 0.77796°W		18th century	The ground floor of the public house is in stone on a plinth, the upper floor is rendered with applied timber framing, and the roof is in pantile with coped gables and kneelers. There are two storeys and two bays containing sash windows. To the right is a carriage entry with a sash window above.	II
Town End Farmhouse and Cottage; 54.24079°N 0.76487°W	—	18th century	A farmhouse divided into two houses, it is in painted brick, rendered on the right, with a pantile roof. There are two storeys and four bays. The upper floor contains sash windows. On the ground floor, the left house has two bay windows and a modern door, and the right house has a doorway with a rectangular fanlight and sash windows.	II
Farmhouse, West Farm; 54.26882°N 0.74615°W	—	18th century	The farmhouse, which was later extended, is in stone, with a part dentilled cornice, and roofs of pantile and Welsh slate with coped gables and small kneelers. There are two storeys and a single-storey extension, a main range, and north and south wings. The windows vary, one is a casement, and some have keystones.	II
White Swan Hotel; 54.24592°N 0.77729°W		18th century	The public house is in stone on a plinth, in brick on the side, and has a mansard roof in Welsh slate. There are two storeys and attics, and four bays. The left bay contains a flat-arched carriage entry, on the right bay is a bow window with a moulded cornice, and to its left is a doorway. The other bay, and those on the upper floor, contain sash windows with triple keystones, and on the attics are four dormers.	II
5 and 6 Market Place; 54.24599°N 0.77764°W		Late 18th century	The building, which was later refronted, was at one time a bank. The ground floor is a rusticated stone, the upper parts are in red brick with stone dressings, and the roof is in Welsh slate. There are three storeys and four bays. The ground floor contains a doorway with a fanlight on the right, and four tall windows. On the upper floors are sash windows with wedge lintels, and to the right is a passage doorway.	II
Beck Isle Cottage; 54.24702°N 0.77942°W	—	Late 18th century	The cottage is in stone with a pantile roof. There are two storeys and three bays, and a single-storey extension to the right. The main part contains a blocked doorway and horizontally-sliding sash windows, and on the extension is a doorway and small windows.	II
Beck Isle Museum; 54.24697°N 0.77980°W		Late 18th century	A house converted into a museum, it is in stone, and in two parts of the same height. The right part has two storeys, and three bays. On the left is a Doric porch with an enriched frieze, and the windows are sashes with Tudor-style hood moulds. The left part has one storey, a plinth, a floor band, a parapet and a slate roof. It contains two tall sash windows with pointed heads and ornamental glazing.	II*
House to left of Fern Leigh; 54.24697°N 0.78030°W	—	Late 18th century	The house is in stone, and has a pantile roof with stone coped gables. There are two storeys and three bays. On the front is a modern door and sash windows.	II
Forest and Vale Hotel; 54.24416°N 0.77551°W		Late 18th century	The hotel incorporates two former cottages. The main hotel is in stone on a plinth, with rusticated quoins, a moulded eaves cornice, a blocking course, and a hipped slate roof. There are two storeys and five bays. In the centre is a doorcase with three-quarter Tuscan columns and a pedimented hood, and a doorway with a semicircular fanlight. The windows are sashes with wedge lintels. The rear wing has three bays, and the cottages, which have two and three storeys, have pantile roofs and casement windows.	II
Hambleton House Farmhouse; 54.26733°N 0.77317°W	—	Late 18th century	The farmhouse is in stone, with rusticated quoins, and a pantile roof with a coped flat-topped gables and kneelers. There are two storeys and attics, and five bays. The doorway is in the centre, above it is a blocked window, and the other windows are sashes; all the openings on the front have keystones. At the rear are two round-headed windows at attic height with Gothic glazing.	II
Kirby Misperton Bridge; 54.20638°N 0.79430°W		Late 18th century	The bridge carries Kirby Misperton Road over Costa Beck. It is in sandstone, and consists of a single segmental arch under a flat band. The bridge has a chamfered string course, and a plain parapet with chamfered coping, ending in square piers.	II
Pickering Low Carr Farmhouse; 54.20325°N 0.78337°W	—	Late 18th century	The farmhouse is in rendered brick, and has a dentilled eaves cornice and a pantile roof. There are two storeys and three bays. The doorway has a rectangular fanlight, the windows on the front are sashes, on the gable end are horizontally sliding sashes, and at the rear are windows with segmental heads.	II
Rose Cottage; 54.24679°N 0.78025°W	—	Late 18th century	The house is in stone, with rusticated quoins, an eaves cornice, and a pantile roof with coped gables and kneelers. There are two storeys and three bays. The central doorway has a rectangular fanlight, and a lintel with a keystone, and is flanked by canted bay windows. The upper floor contains sash windows with lintels and keystones.	II
The Lettered Board Public House; 54.24500°N 0.77586°W		Late 18th century	The public house is in brick on a plinth, the ground floor rendered, with a sill band and a Welsh slate roof. There are three storeys and three bays. The main doorway has pilasters and a pediment, it is flanked by windows with wedge lintels, and to the left is a plain doorway. The upper floors contain sash windows, those on the middle floor with wedge lintels and keystones, the middle one triple.	II
United Reformed Church; 54.24497°N 0.77817°W		1789	The church was enlarged in 1814 and refronted in 1867. The front is in white brick with stone dressings, rusticated quoins, a moulded sill band, a cornice, and a gable containing a circular window. In the centre is an arched doorway flanked by segmental-headed windows with keystones. The upper floor contains a central triple lancet window, flanked by single-light lancets. The rear is in red brick and stone, and contains a porch with columns, and arched windows with Gothic glazing.	II
Friends' Meeting House; 54.24851°N 0.77692°W		1793	The building is in stone with a hipped Welsh slate roof. There is one storey, a rectangular plan, and three bays. The porch has a coped gable and an elliptical-headed entrance with a keystone and impost blocks. The windows are sashes with flat lintels and incised keystones.	II
3 Birdgate; 54.24530°N 0.77558°W		18th to early 19th century	The house is in stone on a plinth, with rusticated quoins, a moulded eaves cornice, a blocking course, and a pantile roof with coped gables. There are two storeys and two bays. Five stone steps with iron railings and a moulded newel finial lead up to the doorway that has a round-arched head and a blocked radial fanlight. The windows are sashes, and are slightly bowed.	II
8 Bridge Street; 54.24658°N 0.77929°W		18th or early 19th century	The house is in stone, and has a pantile roof with a coped gable and kneeler on the left. There are two storeys and two bays. The central doorway has a divided fanlight, the windows are sashes, and there is a large modern dormer.	II
1–3 and 3A Burgate; 54.24584°N 0.77642°W		18th or early 19th century	The building, on a corner site, is in red brick with stone dressings, rusticated quoins, floor bands, a moulded eaves cornice, and a hipped pantile roof. There are three storeys, five bays on Burgate and four on Market Place. On both fronts, the top floor contains lunette windows, and on the middle floor are sash windows. The ground floor on Burgate is rendered, and on Market Place, on the left, is a modern shopfront, and to the right is a doorway flanked by shop windows over a basement.	II
19 and 20 Burgate; 54.24708°N 0.77630°W		18th or early 19th century	A pair of cottages in stone with a pantile roof. There are two storeys and two bays. Steps lead up to doorways in the outer parts, and between them are bow windows. The upper floor contains sash windows.	II
3 and 4 Castlegate; 54.24749°N 0.77623°W	—	18th or early 19th century	A pair of cottages in stone, the right cottage on a plinth, with a pantile roof, stone coped gables and kneelers. There are two storeys and two bays. The doorways are on the left, the windows are horizontally-sliding sashes, and the ground floor openings have lintels with incised keystones.	II
24 and 25 Eastgate; 54.24312°N 0.77297°W	—	18th or early 19th century	A pair of houses in stone, with a pantile roof and coped gables with kneelers. There are two storeys and two bays. Each house has a doorway on the left and a sash window in each floor on the right, all with wedge lintels. To the right is an upper storey link to the next house, containing a casement window.	II
30 Eastgate; 54.24308°N 0.77281°W	—	18th or early 19th century	The house is in stone and has a pantile roof with coped gables. There are two storeys and two bays. The doorway is in the centre, the windows have three lights, and there is a single-storey link to the house on the right.	II
9 Hall Garth; 54.24466°N 0.77515°W		18th or early 19th century	The house is in stone with a pantile roof, two storeys and two bays. Steps led up to the main doorway, and to the right is a passage doorway with a rectangular fanlight. The main doorway is flanked by bow windows, and the upper floor contains four-light casement windows.	II
10–12 Hall Garth; 54.24480°N 0.77505°W		18th or early 19th century	A row of three cottages in stone with pantile roofs. No. 10 has two storeys and two bays, a central doorway, and modern mullioned and transomed windows. The other cottages have one storey and attics, and four bays, and contain sash windows, the upper ones breaking the eaves. The right doorway has a rectangular fanlight, and the left doorway has a radial fanlight.	II
16 and 17 Hall Garth; 54.24524°N 0.77475°W	—	Late 18th or early 19th century	A pair of stone cottages with a pantile roof and two storeys. Each house has a doorway in the outer part with a divided fanlight. No. 16 has a canted bay window to the left, a sash window on the upper floor, and a dormer on the roof. No. 17 has sash window in both floors.	II
17 and 18 Hungate; 54.24450°N 0.77684°W	—	Late 18th or early 19th century	A pair of cottages in stone, with a pantile roof, coped gables and kneelers, and two storeys. The left house has three bays, with a carriage entry in the left bay. To the right is a modern doorway flanked by bow windows, and modern windows above. The right cottage has a central doorway with a blocked rectangular fanlight, and modern mullioned and transomed windows.	II
35 Hungate; 54.24478°N 0.77710°W	—	Late 18th or early 19th century	The house is in stone, with rusticated quoins, a moulded eaves cornice, and a pantile roof with coped gables and kneelers. There are two storeys and three bays. Steps lead up to the central doorway that has carved pilasters, a semicircular fanlight with cable moulding below, and a pediment on consoles. This is flanked by splayed bay windows, and on the upper floor are sash windows with lintels and keystones.	II
39 and 40 Hungate; 54.24488°N 0.77668°W		18th or early 19th century	The house is in painted stone, and has a pantile roof with stone coped gables, and two bays. On the front are two doorways and one casement window, and the other windows are horizontally-sliding sashes. To the right is a storage section with a carriage entry and a modern window.	II
41 Hungate; 54.24475°N 0.77658°W	—	18th to early 19th century	A shop on a corner site with a pantile roof and a coped gable on the left. There are two storeys and three bays. The ground floor contains a shopfront with two modern windows and pilasters, and on the upper floor are sash windows with wedge lintels.	II
42 Hungate; 54.24473°N 0.77642°W	—	18th to early 19th century	A shop and a house in stone, with a moulded eaves cornice and a tile roof. There are two storeys, the shop on the left has two bays, and the house on the right also has two bays. The shop has a shopfront on the ground floor and modern windows above, and the house has a central doorway with a rectangular fanlight, and sash windows with wedge lintels.	II
11 Market Place; 54.24618°N 0.77831°W	—	18th to early 19th century	A restaurant in stone with quoins and a Welsh slate roof. There are two storeys and two bays. The ground floor contains a modern shopfront, and above are two sash windows.	II
18 Market Place; 54.24596°N 0.77831°W		18th to early 19th century	The shop is in stone, and has a pantile roof with a coped gable and kneeler on the right. There are two storeys and three bays. The ground floor contains a modern shopfront, and above are three sash windows.	II
26 Potter Hill; 54.24630°N 0.78117°W	—	Late 18th or early 19th century	The house is in stone, and has a pantile roof with a coped gable and kneeler on the left. There are two storeys and attics, and three bays. The central doorway has pilasters, a rectangular fanlight, and a cornice on console brackets. It is flanked by canted bay windows, the upper floor contains sash windows with keystones, and on the attics are casement windows.	II
36 Potter Hill; 54.24667°N 0.78052°W	—	18th or early 19th century	The house is in stone, with rusticated quoins, a dentilled cornice, shaped corbels at the eaves, and a pantile roof with a flat stone verge. There are two storeys and three bays. The central doorway has grooved pilasters, a semicircular fanlight, and an open pediment on console brackets. It is flanked by splayed bay windows, and the upper floor contains sash windows with lintels and keystones.	II
38 Potter Hill; 54.24664°N 0.78119°W	—	18th or early 19th century	The house is in stone on a rendered plinth, with rusticated quoins, an eaves cornice, and a pantile roof with a flat stone verge and a shaped corbel to the right. Steps lead up to the central doorway that has a rectangular fanlight, it is flanked by canted bay windows, and to the right is a yard door. The upper floor contains sash windows; they and the main doorway have lintels and keystones.	II
44 and 45 Potter Hill; 54.24656°N 0.78223°W	—	18th or early 19th century	Two houses in stone, with rusticated quoins on the right, and a pantile roof with coped gables and kneelers, and two storeys. The right house has two bays, and a central round-headed doorway with a fanlight, flanked by square bay windows. On the upper floor are sash windows with lintels and incised keystones. The left house has one bay, a doorway, and windows with modern mullions and transoms. All the openings have lintels and wedge keystones.	II
7 Train Lane; 54.24618°N 0.78031°W	—	18th to early 19th century	The cottage is in stone, and has a pantile roof with a coped verge and a kneeler on the right. There are two storeys and two bays. The doorway is on the left, and the windows are sashes.	II
7 Westgate; 54.24554°N 0.78349°W	—	18th to early 19th century	A cottage in stone with a pantile roof, two storeys and three bays. The doorway is in the right bay, and the windows are sashes.	II
29 Westgate; 54.24625°N 0.78630°W	—	Late 18th or early 19th century	The cottage is in stone with a pantile roof. There are two storeys and an L-shaped plan, with a front of two bays, and a later rear wing. The doorway is in the centre, and the windows have three lights.	II
49 and 50 Westgate; 54.24695°N 0.78808°W	—	18th or early 19th century	A pair of stone cottages with a pantile roof. There are two storeys, and each cottage has one bay and a doorway on the left. The windows are modern, with mullions and transoms.	II
110 Westgate; 54.24655°N 0.78653°W	—	18th or early 19th century	The house is in stone with a pantile roof. There are two storeys and two bays. The central doorway is flanked by bow windows, the left larger, and on the upper floor are horizontally-sliding sash windows.	II
Barr Farmhouse; 54.21885°N 0.76999°W	—	Late 18th or early 19th century	The farmhouse is in brick, with an eaves cornice, and a pantile roof with stone coped gables and kneelers. There are two storeys and three bays. The doorway is in the centre, and the windows have modern glazing.	II
Farm buildings north of Barr Farmhouse; 54.21911°N 0.77011°W	—	Late 18th or early 19th century	The farm buildings are in stone with pantile roofs. They form a range to the north of the farmhouse.	II
Blansby Park Farmhouse; 54.26906°N 0.73554°W		Late 18th or early 19th century	The farmhouse is in stone, and has a pantile roof with stone coped gables and kneelers. There are two storeys and three bays. The central doorway has a three-light rectangular fanlight, and the windows have lintels with incised keystones.	II
Farm buildings, Blansby Park Farm; 54.26934°N 0.73587°W	—	Late 18th or early 19th century	The farm buildings are in stone with pantile roofs. They include a stable range with one storey, and a block with two storeys at right angles. The yard is now closed.	II
Farm buildings to west and north of East Hambleton Farm; 54.27595°N 0.76511°W	—	Late 18th or early 19th century	The farm buildings are in stone with pantile roofs. They include a two-storey stable and storage building, facing a single-storey stable block across a yard.	II
Farm buildings, Keld Head Farm (East); 54.25047°N 0.79243°W	—	18th or early 19th century	The farm buildings are in stone with pantile roofs. One building has a carriage door with a hoist above in the gable end. There is a smaller building to the left, and a stable block.	II
Manor House Farmhouse; 54.25474°N 0.74875°W	—	18th or early 19th century	The farmhouse is in stone on a large plinth, with rusticated quoins, a floor band, and a pantile roof with coped gables and kneelers. There are two storeys and three bays. The central doorway has a rectangular fanlight, the windows are sashes, and all the openings have keystones.	II
Oak Tree Farmhouse; 54.27874°N 0.75913°W	—	Late 18th or early 19th century	The farmhouse is rendered, and has a stone eaves cornice and stone coped gables and kneelers. There are two storeys and three bays. The door has a blocked fanlight, and the windows are casements.	II
Farm buildings, Park Gate Farm; 54.26184°N 0.76103°W	—	18th or early 19th century	The farm buildings are in stone with pantile roofs, and are mainly in one storey and arranged around a courtyard. Facing the road is a building with two storeys, containing three carriage entries, a hoist door and a window above, and with an extension on the left.	II
Farm buildings, West Farm; 54.26880°N 0.74529°W	—	18th or early 19th century	The range of large farm buildings is in stone, and has roofs of pantile and corrugated iron. It includes a stable block, and a building with a triple carriage entry and four hoist doors above.	II
Yatts Brow Farmhouse; 54.26712°N 0.75983°W	—	Late 18th or early 19th century	The farmhouse is in stone, and has pantile roofs with stone coped gables and kneelers. There are two storeys and three bays. On the front is a doorway and sash windows.	II
Yatts Farmhouse; 54.28423°N 0.75655°W		Late 18th or early 19th century	The farmhouse is in stone and has a double pile pantile roof. There are two storeys and three bays. In the centre is a doorway with a rectangular four-pane fanlight, and the windows are sashes.	II
25 Hall Garth; 54.24544°N 0.77529°W		1809	A vicarage, later a private house, in brick on a stone basement, with rusticated quoins, and a pantile roof with coped gables. There are two storeys and a basement, and three bays. A flight of steps leads up to a doorway with grooved pilasters, a blocked semicircular fanlight, and an ornamental entablature. The windows are sashes with brick voussoirs and stone triple keystones. At the rear is a Venetian window.	II
14, 19 and 21 Brant Hill; 54.24741°N 0.77772°W	—	Early 19th century	A row of stone cottages with two storeys. No. 14 on the right has two bays and a Welsh slate roof. The doorway, with a rectangular fanlight, is on the left, and on the right are sash windows with wedge lintels. The other cottages have four bays, and contain doorways and a bow window, and the other windows are sashes. To the left is a single-storey extension.	II
21 Burgate; 54.24717°N 0.77628°W	—	Early 19th century	The house is in stone, with rusticated quoins, a moulded eaves cornice, and a pantile roof with coped gables and kneelers. There are two storeys and three bays. The central doorway has pilasters, a blocked semicircular radial fanlight, and a flat hood on brackets. This is flanked by canted bay windows, and the upper floor contains sash windows with lintels and keystones.	II
33 Burgate; 54.24634°N 0.77663°W		Early 19th century	The house is in painted brick, with a floor band, and a pantile roof with a coped gable and kneeler on the left. There are two storeys and three bays. Steps lead to a doorway with a divided fanlight in the right bay, and to its left are modern windows. The upper floor contains sash windows with triple keystones, the middle one blocked.	II
9 Castlegate; 54.24914°N 0.77622°W		Early 19th century or earlier	The cottage is in stone with a pantile roof. There is one storey and an attic, and two bays. The doorway is on the right, the windows are sashes, and on the upper floor are half-dormers breaking through the eaves.	II
10 Castlegate; 54.24909°N 0.77623°W		Early 19th century or earlier	The cottage is in stone with a pantile roof. There is one storey and an attic, and two bays. The doorway is on the left, and the windows are horizontally-sliding sashes, those on the upper floor breaking through the eaves.	II
11 Castlegate; 54.24902°N 0.77625°W	—	Early 19th century or earlier	The cottage is in stone with a pantile roof. There are two storeys and three bays. The doorway has plain pilasters and a cornice. The windows are horizontally-sliding sashes, those on the ground floor with painted lintels and incised keystones.	II
12 and 13 Castlegate; 54.24895°N 0.77627°W	—	Early 19th century	A pair of cottages in painted stone with a pantile roof. There are two storeys and four bays. Each cottage has a doorway on the left with a rectangular fanlight, one blocked, above which is a blocked window. In the right bays are sash windows, those on the ground floor with lintels and incised keystones.	II
17 Eastgate; 54.24348°N 0.77370°W	—	Early 19th century	The cottage is in stone with a pantile roof. There are two storeys and two bays. On the left is a segmental-arched carriage entry, rusticated on the right, and to its right are a sash window and a doorway, both with wedge lintels. The upper floor contains two sash windows.	II
29 Eastgate; 54.24372°N 0.77246°W	—	Early 19th century	The cottage is in rendered stone with a pantile roof. There are two bays, and the modern doorway is at the rear. The windows are horizontally-sliding sashes with lintels and keystones, and there is also a round-headed window.	II
34 Eastgate; 54.24291°N 0.77252°W	—	Early 19th century	The cottage is in stone on a rendered plinth, and it has a pantile roof. There are two storeys and two bays. The doorway is in the centre, and the windows have three lights with casements.	II
35 and 36 Eastgate; 54.24287°N 0.77242°W	—	Early 19th century	A pair of stone cottages with a pantile roof. There are two storeys and two bays. Each cottage has an outer doorway with a rectangular fanlight, the right cottage has a bow window, and the other windows are sashes. The openings all have wedge lintels.	II
53 Eastgate; 54.24250°N 0.77148°W	—	Early 19th century	A cottage in stone on a plinth of larger stones, with quoins and a pantile roof. There are two storeys and three bays. In the left bay is an elliptical-arched carriage entry, above which is a sash window, both with rusticated surrounds. To the right is a doorway and sash windows, all with wedge lintels.	II
55 and 56 Eastgate; 54.24242°N 0.77121°W	—	Early 19th century	A pair of cottages in stone on a plinth of larger stones, with a pantile roof. There are two storeys and three bays. In the centre are two doorways with blocked fanlights flanking a passage door. The windows are sashes, and all the ground floor openings have wedge lintels.	II
59 Eastgate; 54.24210°N 0.77028°W	—	Early 19th century	The cottage is in stone with a pantile roof. There are two storeys and two bays. On the front is a doorway and horizontally-sliding sash windows.	II
64 and 65 Eastgate; 54.24196°N 0.76983°W	—	Early 19th century	A pair of cottages in stone, with rusticated quoins, and a pantile roof with a coped gable and kneeler on the right. There are two storeys and four bays. Each cottage has a doorway in the outer bay with a rectangular fanlight and a segmental head. To the right of the left doorway is a bow window, on the upper floor are casement windows with segmental heads, and on the roof is a modern dormer. Above the right doorway is a blocked window, and to the left are sash windows, all with segmental heads.	II
118 Eastgate; 54.24291°N 0.77335°W	—	Early 19th century	The house is in stone on a plinth, with rusticated quoins, a floor band, a cornice and blocking course, and a Welsh slate roof. There are two storeys and three bays, and flanking lower single-bay wings. In the centre is a Roman Ionic portico, and a recessed doorway with a semicircular fanlight. The windows are sashes with wedge lintels. The left wing contains an elliptical carriage entry with a rusticated surround, and a window above, and on the right wing is a segmental-headed doorway with a rusticated surround, and a window on each floor to the left.	II
20 Hall Garth; 54.24550°N 0.77458°W	—	Early 19th century	The house is in stone with a Welsh slate roof, two storeys and three bays. The central doorway has pilasters, a rectangular fanlight and a moulded flat hood. It is flanked by canted bay windows, and the upper floor contains sash windows.	II
5 and 6 Hungate; 54.24437°N 0.77615°W		Early 19th century	A pair of cottages in stone with a pantile roof. There are two storeys and two bays. The doorways are in the centre, the left house has sash windows, and on the right house are modern windows. The roof has two modern dormers.	II
21 Hungate; 54.24471°N 0.77745°W	—	Early 19th century	The house is rendered and has a Welsh slate roof with kneelers. There are two storeys and three bays. Steps lead up to the doorway in the left bay, which is recessed and has a fanlight, and a flat hood on console brackets. The windows are sashes with wedge lintels.	II
27 Hungate; 54.24480°N 0.77853°W		Early 19th century	The house is in stone with a slate roof. There are two storeys and three bays. The central doorway has a rectangular fanlight, the windows are sashes, and all the openings have wedge lintels.	II
49–51 Hungate; 54.24455°N 0.77578°W	—	Early 19th century	A pair of offices in brick, with a pantile roof and a coped gable and kneeler on the left. There are two storeys, and each office has two bays. The left office has a shop window with pilasters, and a doorway to the left. The right office has a central doorway with pilasters, a frieze and a cornice. The windows are sashes, and the windows and left doorway have brick voussoirs.	II
52 Hungate; 54.24451°N 0.77563°W	—	Early 19th century	An office on a corner site in stone with a pantile roof. On the front are two storeys and three bays, the right bay higher. The right return is gabled, and has one bay, two storeys and an attic. The ground floor contains a modern shopfront. On the gable end, the upper floor has a canted bay window, and the other windows are sashes, some with wedge lintels.	II
1 and 3 Keld Head; 54.24945°N 0.79188°W	—	Early 19th century	A pair of houses in stone, with an eaves cornice, and a pantile roof with coped gables. There are two storeys and three bays. On the ground floor are two doorways with fanlights and lintels with keystones, and three canted bay windows. The upper floor contains three sash windows with lintels and keystones, and one modern window. To the right and recessed is a later two-storey brick extension.	II
7 Market Place; 54.24602°N 0.77777°W		Early 19th century	The shop is rendered at the front and is in stone on the sides. There are three storeys and three bays. The ground floor has a 19th-century shopfront with paired pilasters and a fascia. On the upper floors are sash windows with wedge lintels.	II
40 and 41 Market Place; 54.24560°N 0.77695°W		Early 19th century	The main block is a club building, and a bank extension at the front was added in 1912. The main block is in brick with stone dressings, rusticated quoins, dentilled eaves and a parapet. There are three storeys and five bays, the middle bay narrower and flanked by rusticated pilasters. All the windows are under painted round arches; those on the top floor are lunettes. The doorway to the right has pilasters and a cornice, and in the middle bay is a round-arched passage doorway with a keystone. The bank extension on the left has one storey and three bays, and is in brick with stone dressings.	II
23–27 Park Terrace; 54.24766°N 0.77776°W		Early 19th century	A row of six cottages in stone, the roof to the left is in pantile, and to the right it is in Welsh slate. There are two storeys and eight bays. Steps lead up to the doorways, most of the windows are sashes and some are modern.	II
4 Potter Hill; 54.24597°N 0.78277°W	—	Early 19th century	The cottage is in stone, and has a pantile roof with stone coped gables and kneelers. There are two storeys and two bays. The doorway is in the centre, and the windows have modern mullions and transoms, the ground floor openings with lintels.	II
40 Potter Hill; 54.24663°N 0.78154°W	—	Early 19th century	The cottage is in stone with rusticated quoins on the left, and a pantile roof. There are two storeys and two bays. Steps lead up to the doorway in the left bay, the windows are sashes, and all the openings have lintels with triple keystones.	II
47 Potter Hill; 54.24654°N 0.78244°W	—	Early 19th century	A house converted into two cottages, in stone with a pantile roof. There are two storeys and two bays. In the centre are paired doorways, and the windows are a mix of sashes and modern windows, some with lintels and incised keystones.	II
2–4 Smiddy Hill; 54.24510°N 0.77547°W		Early 19th century	A row of three brick houses on a rendered plinth, with a Welsh slate roof. There are two storeys and attics, and three bays. Each house has a doorway on the left with a rectangular fanlight, an inset boot scraper, a sash window in each floor, and a dormer breaking the eaves.	II
13 Train Lane; 54.24898°N 0.77790°W	—	Early 19th century	The house is in stone, and has a pantile roof with stone coped gables and kneelers. There are two storeys and three bays. In the centre is a doorway, to the left is a passage door, both with a rectangular fanlight, and the windows are sashes.	II
14–19 Under Cliffe; 54.24914°N 0.77787°W		Early 19th century	A row of six stone cottages on a plinth, with a pantile roof and kneelers on the gable ends. There are two storeys and six bays. Each cottage has a doorway with a fanlight, some blocked, on the left, and a window in each floor on the right; most are sashes and some are modern.	II
1 and 2 Westgate; 54.24534°N 0.78263°W	—	Early 19th century	A pair of stone houses with a stone slate roof. There are two storeys and two bays. Each house has a doorway on the left with a rectangular fanlight, and to the right is a sash window on both floors. All the openings have wedge lintels.	II
24–27 Westgate; 54.24600°N 0.78536°W	—	Early 19th century	A row of four cottages in stone with a pantile roof and two storeys. Each cottage has a doorway, the upper window of No. 25 is modern and breaks the eaves, and the other windows are horizontally-sliding sashes.	II
42–48 Westgate; 54.24685°N 0.78781°W	—	Early 19th century	A row of seven stone cottages, one faced in brick, with a pantile roof. They have two storeys and one or two bays each, and all the cottages have a doorway. The windows vary; some are modern, some are horizontally-sliding sashes, and there are two bow windows.	II
87–96 Westgate; 54.24733°N 0.78826°W	—	Early 19th century	A row of ten cottages in stone with a pantile roof. There are two storeys, and each cottage has one bay. The doorways are on the left, one cottage has modern windows, the end cottages have a shop window on the ground floor, and the other windows are horizontally-sliding sashes.	II
97–102 Westgate; 54.24701°N 0.78759°W	—	Early 19th century	A row of seven stone houses with a pantile roof. There are two storeys, and each house has two bays. The doorways, on the left, have rectangular fanlights, the windows are sashes, and all the openings have wedge lintels.	II
1 and 2 Whitby Road; 54.24733°N 0.77569°W	—	Early 19th century	A pair of houses in stone, with a pantile roof, stone coped gables and kneelers. There are two storeys and attics, and each house has one bay. In the centre are paired doorways with rectangular fanlights, and lintels with keystones, flanked by canted bay windows. The upper floor contains sash windows with lintels and keystones, and in the attics are dormers.	II
Farm buildings north of Beck Isle Museum; 54.24717°N 0.77958°W	—	Early 19th century	The farm buildings, including a stable block and the former farm house, are arranged around a courtyard. They are in stone and have pantile roofs with stone coped gables and kneelers. The buildings are mainly in two storeys, and the openings include a carriage doorway, doors and windows, a circular window, and a hoist opening.	II
Eastgate House; 54.24360°N 0.77478°W		Early 19th century	At one time an employment exchange, the house is in stone on a plinth, rendered on the front, with rusticated quoins, a moulded eaves cornice, a blocking course, and a hipped slate roof. There are two storeys and three bays. In the centre is a doorway with three-quarter attached Doric columns, an entablature, a semicircular fanlight and an open pediment, above which is a window with a moulded flat hood on consoles. The outer bays contain large two-storey bow windows with sashes. In front of the house are gate piers and railings.	II
Wall, Forest and Vale Hotel; 54.24395°N 0.77544°W	—	Early 19th century (probable)	The high stone wall curves away from the hotel, and then extends along Malton Road.	II
Former Horse Shoe Public House; 54.24433°N 0.77512°W		Early 19th century	The former public house is in painted brick on a stone plinth, with rusticated quoins, floor bands, and a Welsh slate roof. There are three storeys and three bays. In the right bay is a segmental-headed carriage entry, and to its left is a doorway with a rectangular fanlight flanked by sash windows. In the central bay of the middle floor is a canted bay window, and elsewhere the windows are sashes.	II
Ings Bridge; 54.22748°N 0.78802°W		Early 19th century (probable)	The bridge carries a track over Pickering Beck. It is in stone, and consists of a single segmental arch with voussoirs and a steeply-arched parapet.	II
Farmhouse between Keld Head Farm (East) and The Low House; 54.25068°N 0.79295°W	—	Early 19th century	The farmhouse is in stone with rusticated quoins and a pantile roof. There are two storeys and two bays. Three steps lead up to the doorway in the right bay that has a rectangular fanlight, the windows are sashes, and all the openings have wedge lintels.	II
Farm buildings between Keld Head Farm (East) and The Low House; 54.25089°N 0.79284°W	—	Early 19th century	The farm buildings are in stone and are repaired in brick. They extend round three sides of s courtyard, and have plain openings, including stable doors.	II
Leas Farmhouse; 54.22956°N 0.78763°W		Early 19th century	The farmhouse is in painted brick, and has a pantile roof with stone coped gables and kneelers. There are two storeys and three bays. The central doorway and the windows, which are horizontally sliding sashes, have elliptical heads. To the right is a former two-storey storage section.	II
Farmhouse, Low Carr; 54.20750°N 0.78963°W		Early 19th century	The farmhouse is in brick with a dentilled eaves cornice and a pantile roof. There are two storeys and two bays. In the centre is a doorway, the windows are sashes, and all the openings have segmental arches.	II
Lowther House; 54.25661°N 0.76849°W	—	Early 19th century	The house is in stone, and has a Welsh slate roof with coped gables and kneelers. There are two storeys and three bays. In the centre is a doorway with a porch, and the windows are sashes.	II
Lydds Farmhouse; 54.28552°N 0.75655°W	—	Early 19th century	The farmhouse is in stone, with rusticated quoins, and a pantile roof with stone coped gables and kneelers. There are two storeys and three bays. In the centre is a gabled porch, and the windows are sashes with lintels and keystones.	II
Farm buildings northeast of Lydds Farmhouse; 54.28567°N 0.75655°W	—	Early 19th century	The range of farm buildings is in stone with a pantile roof. There is one storey, and it is in the yard to the rear of the farmhouse.	II
Masonic Hall; 54.24670°N 0.77901°W	—	Early 19th century	Originally a chapel, the hall is in stone, and has a pantile roof with stone coped gables and kneelers. There are two storeys, and the round-arched doorway has a fanlight. In the centre is a blocked round-headed window, and the other windows are sashes with lintels and incised keystones.	II
Memorial Hall; 54.24653°N 0.78007°W		Early 19th century	A corn mill, later extended and converted for community use, it is in stone with rusticated quoins, floor bands, four storeys and an overhanging gabled roof. On the north front is a projecting gabled rendered war memorial extension. At the west end is a two-storey semicircular entrance extension.	II
Mill House Flats; 54.24635°N 0.77985°W		Early 19th century	A warehouse converted into flats, it is in stone on a plinth, with quoins, floor bands, and a slate roof with overhanging eaves. There are four storeys and five bays on the north front, with former loft doorways in the centre and casement windows elsewhere. The east front has three bays.	II
Nova Lodge; 54.27792°N 0.78621°W	—	Early 19th century	The house is in stone, with brick at the front, a Welsh slate roof, and two storeys. It is in two builds, the right section with three bays, a bay window and sash windows. The left part is later and taller, and has two canted bay windows. The door is at the rear.	II
Farm buildings southeast of Nova Lodge; 54.27781°N 0.78417°W	—	Early 19th century	The block of farm buildings is in stone, and includes a rectangular building with a central turret in wood and a large iron weathervane. There are stables at right angles.	II
Pickering Low Mill; 54.23308°N 0.78617°W		Early 19th century	The building is in stone, and has a pantile roof with stone coped gables and kneelers. There are three storeys and two bays. In the centre is a doorway approached by a perron, some windows are sashes, and others are modern. To the left is a two-storey one-bay extension with a doorway, and a window with a keystone above, and further to the left is a single-storey extension.	II
Prospect House Farmhouse; 54.21283°N 0.76034°W	—	Early 19th century	The farmhouse is in brick, with a floor band, and a pantile roof with stone coped gables and kneelers. There are two storeys and three bays. On the front is a plain doorway and sash windows.	II
Rycea and Rycea Cottage; 54.25031°N 0.76873°W	—	Early 19th century	The house and cottage are in stone, and have pantile roofs with stone coped verges. Rycea has rusticated quoins, and two bays. In the centre is a gabled porch, and on its left is a canted bay window. The cottage to the right has three bays and a central doorway with a fanlight. All the openings have wedge lintels. To the left of Rycea is a two-storey one-bay extension.	II
St Joseph's Presbytery; 54.24662°N 0.78167°W	—	Early 19th century	The presbytery is in rendered stone on a plinth, with a floor band, a flat eaves course, and a Welsh slate roof and flat stone verges. There are two storeys and four bays. On the first and third bays, steps lead up to round-headed doorways with semicircular fanlights. The windows have semicircular heads and contain sashes.	II
Former Temperance Hall; 54.24638°N 0.77917°W		Early 19th century	Originally a Methodist church, and later used for other purposes, it is in stone. There are two storeys, two bays on the gabled entrance front, and three bays along the side. The recessed doorway has a rectangular fanlight, the windows are sashes, and all the openings have keystones. Above them is a string course, in the gable is a circular window, and there are scrolled pediment terminals.	II
The Broates Farmhouse and farm buildings 54.27555°N 0.78475°W		Early 19th century	The farmhouse is in stone with a pantile roof, and has two storeys and four bays. The doorway has a plain surround, and the windows are horizontally sliding sashes. The attached farm buildings include a single-storey carriage store and a barn at right angles.	II
Railings, gates and memorial, United Reformed Church; 54.24503°N 0.77800°W	—	Early 19th century	The iron railings and gates are on the courtyard to the east of the church. They incorporate a stone memorial with an urn and a plinth.	II
Vivers Mill, mill house, cottages and outbuildings 54.23993°N 0.78086°W		Early 19th century	The corn mill is in stone and some brick, with quoins, four storeys and four bays. It contains doorways, windows and a weatherboarded gabled hoist. To the left is a single storey extension, and to the right is the mill house, with two storeys, two bays and horizontally sliding sash windows, and an archway over a stream. At the rear are a cottage and outbuildings.	II
West View; 54.24565°N 0.78293°W	—	Early 19th century	The house is in stone, and has a Welsh slate roof with stone coped gables. There are two storeys and four bays. On the front is a doorway with a rectangular three-pane fanlight, and the windows are sashes with carved lintels.	II
Outbuildings to north of White Swan Hotel; 54.24620°N 0.77705°W	—	Early 19th century	The outbuildings are in stone with pantile roofs, and consist of two two-storey stables.	II
Stable block to east of Wray House; 54.20528°N 0.75636°W	—	Early 19th century	The stable block is in brick and has one storey.	II
Former York County Savings Bank; 54.24584°N 0.77694°W	—	Early 19th century	The bank, later used as offices, is in stone with a pantile roof. There are two storeys and two bays. On the ground floor is a 19th century shopfront and door, and to the right is a doorway approached by steps. The upper floor contains a bay window, and to the right is a mullioned and transomed modern window.	II
Former school building 54.24524°N 0.77422°W	—	1828	The building is in stone, with quoins, an eaves cornice and a slate roof. On the front are three windows, two with pointed heads and Gothic glazing, and the middle one with a flat head and a dated lintel. Steps lead up to the doorway.	II
5 Castlegate; 54.24760°N 0.77615°W		Early to mid-19th century	The house is in stone with string courses and a Welsh slate roof. There are three storeys and three bays, the outer bays projecting and gabled, and a lean-to bay on the right containing a segmental-headed carriage archway. Steps lead up to the central doorway that has pilasters, an architrave, a segmental-headed fanlight, and a flat hood on carved brackets. Above it is a round-headed window with a keystone, and above it is a small window. The outer bays contain a canted bay window on the ground floor, and above is a sash window, and a round-headed window in the gable, all with keystones.	II
4 Eastgate; 54.24375°N 0.77422°W	—	Early to mid-19th century	A shop with the front in red brick and stone elsewhere, with stone dressings, rusticated quoins, a dentilled brick eaves cornice and a pantile roof. There are two storeys and three bays. The ground floor contains a modern shopfront, and on the upper floor are sash windows with wedge lintels, and vermiculated keystones. On the right is a link to the adjacent building, containing a carriage entry.	II
23 Eastgate; 54.24321°N 0.77304°W	—	Early to mid-19th century	The house is in stone on a plinth, with rusticated quoins, a sill band, an eaves cornice, and a Welsh slate roof with coped gables. There are two storeys and attics, and the main part has three bays. Steps lead up to the central round-arched doorway that has a fanlight and a carved head. The windows are sashes, those on the ground floor with carved architraves, a rusticated head and a keystone. The upper floor windows have moulded surrounds and triple keystones, and in the attics are modern dormers. To the left is a recessed bay containing a round-arched doorway, above which is a round-arched niche.	II
33 Eastgate; 54.24298°N 0.77258°W	—	Early to mid-19th century	The house is in stone with a hipped pantile roof. The gable end faces the road and has two storeys and two bays. On the ground floor is a shop window with pilasters and a fascia, and a doorway to the right, and the upper floor contains two modern mullioned and transomed windows.	II
37 Eastgate; 54.24285°N 0.77230°W		Early to mid-19th century	A stone house on a plinth, with rusticated quoins, sill bands, and a Welsh slate roof. There are three storeys and two bays. The doorway has pilasters, a rectangular fanlight, and a cornice on consoles, and to its left is a canted bay window. The upper floors contain sash windows.	II
42 Eastgate; 54.24279°N 0.77214°W		Early to mid-19th century	The house is in stone, with rusticated quoins, a moulded floor band, a sill band, an eaves band and cornice, and a Welsh slate roof. There are three storeys and three bays. The central doorway has a rusticated surround and a rectangular fanlight, and it is flanked by canted bay windows with cornices. The upper floors contain sash windows with rusticated surrounds.	II
43–45 Eastgate; 54.24273°N 0.77202°W	—	Early to mid-19th century	A row of three cottages in stone on a plinth, with rusticated quoins and a pantile roof. There are two storeys and three bays. Each cottage has a doorway with a rectangular fanlight on the left, and a sash window in each floor on the right.	II
46, 47 and 49 Eastgate; 54.24265°N 0.77182°W	—	Early to mid-19th century	A row of cottages with a pantile roof, two storeys and six bays. Between the first and third bays are paired doorways, with sash windows flanking them and on the upper floor. The fourth bay contains an elliptical-headed carriage arch with a rusticated surround and a small window above, and on the other bays are sash windows.	II
62 and 63 Eastgate; 54.24200°N 0.76995°W	—	Early to mid-19th century	A pair of cottages in stone, with a pantile roof and a coped gable and kneeler on the left. There are two storeys and two bays. In each cottage, a doorway with a rectangular fanlight is on the right, and on the left is a sash window in each floor. All the openings have wedge lintels.	II
4 Hungate; 54.24435°N 0.77606°W		Early to mid-19th century	The house is in stone with a pantile roof, two storeys and two bays. In the right bay is a doorway, and the windows are modern with mullion and transoms, the upper window in the left bay breaking the eaves.	II
11–15 Hungate; 54.24445°N 0.77655°W	—	Early to mid-19th century	A row of five stone houses in stone with a pantile roof. There are three storeys, and each house has one bay. To the right of each house is a doorway with a rectangular fanlight, and to the left is a sash window in each floor.	II
3 and 4 Westgate; 54.24539°N 0.78285°W	—	Early to mid-19th century	A pair of houses in stone with a sill band and a Welsh slate roof. There are two storeys and attics, and three bays. In the centre are paired round-headed doorways with segmental fanlights and vermiculated keystones, flanked by canted bay windows. The other windows are casements, those on the upper floor with vermiculated keystones.	II
7 Hall Garth; 54.24450°N 0.77523°W	—	c. 1840	A police station, later a shop, in stone with a moulded cornice and a Welsh slate roof. There are three storeys and three bays, the middle by projecting slightly. In the left two bays of the ground floor is a modern shopfront, and to the right is a round-arched doorway with a radial fanlight. On the middle bay of the upper floors are round-arched windows, with voussoirs, and the outer bays contain sash windows with wedge lintels.	II
Pickering railway station 54.24727°N 0.77850°W		1846	The railway station was designed by G. T. Andrews for the York and North Midland Railway, and is currently the southern terminus for the North Yorkshire Moors Railway. It consists of two platforms, the former station house, and retaining stone walls. The house is in stone on a plinth, and has a hipped slate roof with overhanging eaves. It has one storey and seven bays, and contains a large segmental-arched entrance.	II
Building, former goods yard, Pickering railway station 54.24546°N 0.77990°W		1847	The gas retort house, designed by G. T. Andrews and later used for other purposes, is in stone, with a frieze, a moulded string course at impost level, a moulded cornice, a blocking course, and a slate roof with weatherboarding on the gable end. On the front are three semicircular-arched recesses containing small-pane windows, and in each return is a semicircular-arched entry.	II
1 and 2 Birdgate; 54.24517°N 0.77563°W		Mid-19th century	Two houses on a corner site, later used for other purposes, in stone. There are two storeys and attics, three bays on the front, and two on the right return. On the left is a shopfront with a fascia and a cornice, to the right is a canted bay window with a moulded and dentilled cornice, and further to the right is a doorway with a rectangular fanlight and a dentilled cornice on brackets. The upper floor contains three windows, and in the attic are two gabled dormers. On the right return are two canted bay windows, above which are two windows and a gabled dormer.	II
112 Eastgate; 54.24257°N 0.77237°W	—	Mid-19th century	The house is in stone on a rendered plinth and has a pantile roof. There are two storeys and three bays. The doorway in the left bay has a rectangular fanlight, and the windows are sashes.	II
113 Eastgate; 54.24261°N 0.77249°W	—	Mid-19th century	The house is in stone with rusticated quoins and a pantile roof. There are two storeys and two bays. The central doorway has a rectangular fanlight, and the windows are sashes.	II
114 Eastgate; 54.24270°N 0.77274°W	—	Mid-19th century	The house is in stone with a pantile roof. There are two storeys and two bays. The central doorway has pilasters, a rectangular fanlight, and a cornice on consoles, and the windows are sashes.	II
18 Hall Garth; 54.24531°N 0.77469°W	—	Mid-19th century	The house is in stone on the front with brick on the sides, and has three storeys, three bays, and a narrow extension to the right. The windows are sashes with stone surrounds, those on the ground floor with hood moulds. The doorway is in the extension and has a four-centred arched head, and an arched hood mould.	II
4 Market Place; 54.24595°N 0.77749°W		Mid-19th century	The building is in stone, and the roof is hipped on the left. There are two storeys, two gabled attics, and two bays. The ground floor contains a modern shopfront, on the upper floor are two canted bay windows, and on the two attics are round-headed windows. At the rear is an 18th-century wing with sash windows.	II
6 Westgate; 54.24550°N 0.78335°W		Mid-19th century	The house is in stone with a pantile roof. There are two storeys and two bays. On the left bay is a doorway, and to its left are sash windows with chamfered surrounds, segmental-arched heads and keystones. In each floor of the right bay is a two-light sash window under a segmental-arched head, with a keystone.	II
8 and 9 Westgate; 54.24554°N 0.78363°W	—	Mid-19th century	The house is in stone, with a moulded eaves cornice on ornamental brackets, and a pantile roof with a part stone coped gable on the right. There are two storeys and attics, and three bays. In the centre is a segmental-arched carriage entrance with a keystone on consoles. This is flanked by round-arched doorways with pilasters and keystones, and outside these are canted bay windows with carved parapets. The windows on the upper floor have round-arched heads, those in the outer bays paired, all with keystones, and in the attic are two dormers.	II
15 and 16 Westgate; 54.24576°N 0.78442°W	—	Mid-19th century	Two houses in stone with a pantile roof. There are two storeys, the left house has one bay, and the right house has two. Each house has a doorway with a rectangular fanlight, the windows are sashes, and on the roof of the right house are two flat-roofed dormers.	II
51–64 Westgate; 54.24727°N 0.78874°W	—	Mid-19th century	A row of 14 cottages in brick on a stone plinth with a Welsh slate roof. There are two storeys and each cottage has one bay. On the right of each cottage is a doorway, most with a fanlight, and in both floors is a window. All the openings have segmental heads.	II
Fern Leigh; 54.24703°N 0.78011°W	—	Mid-19th century	The house is in stone with a pantile roof. There are two storeys and three bays, the left bay lower. The doorway on the left bay has a rectangular fanlight and a keystone. To its right is a canted bay window, and the upper floor contains casement windows with keystones. On the left bay is a carriage doorway and a storage window above.	II
Former Midland Bank; 54.24608°N 0.77874°W		Mid-19th century	The building is in stone on a plinth on the front and right return, in red brick on the left return, and is rendered at the rear. It has rusticated quoins, floor bands, and a hipped Welsh slate roof. There are two storeys and four bays. On the ground floor are four round-headed openings, the right a doorway and the other windows, with impost bands and triple keystones. The upper floor contains four windows with carved surrounds. To the left are iron gates and stone gate piers.	II
School House; 54.24563°N 0.77486°W		Mid-19th century	The former school house is in stone, with quoins and a Welsh slate roof. There are two storeys and two gabled bays, the left larger and with a finial. The doorway in the right bay has ornamental hinges and shaped spandrels, and a single-light window above. The left bay contains two-light windows with splayed reveals, and over the ground floor window is a hood mould which continues over the doorway.	II.
Signal box 54.25788°N 0.76912°W		Mid-19th century	The signal box is in brick, and has a slate roof and two storeys. On the front facing the line are two large windows on the upper floor, and two smaller round-headed windows below. On the left return are external steps leading to an upper floor doorway, and on the right return is a large window and a smaller round-headed window.	II.
Westgate Guest House; 54.24545°N 0.78317°W		Mid-19th century	The house is in stone, with quoins, heavy eaves on paired narrow brackets, and a pyramidal Welsh slate roof. There are two storeys and attics, and three bays. The central doorway has pilasters, an entablature, a semicircular fanlight, and a cornice, and it is flanked by canted bay windows. The upper floor contains sash windows with keystones, and in the attic are two dormers with Dutch gables and finials.	II.
Woodland Cottage; 54.25784°N 0.76927°W		Mid-19th century	The cottage is in painted brick and has a Welsh slate roof. There are two storeys, and two bays, the right bay projecting and gabled. On the right bay is a canted bay window, and the other windows are sashes.	II.
8 Hall Garth; 54.24457°N 0.77518°W		Mid to late 19th century	The building is in red brick on a plinth, with stucco dressings, floor and sill bands, and a Welsh slate roof. There are three storeys and three bays. Steps lead up to the central doorway that has a rusticated surround, a rectangular fanlight and a triple keystone. The window above the doorway has a segmental pediment, and the windows in the outer bays of the lower two floors have stone surrounds and triple keystones. On the top floor are casement windows with stucco surrounds on cornices joined by bands.	II
Ivyleigh; 54.24511°N 0.77483°W	—	Mid to late 19th century	The house is in stone with quoins and a Welsh slate roof. There are two storeys and attics, and four bays, the second and fourth bays larger, projecting under gables with ornamental bargeboards. In both of these bays is a canted bay window, above which is a sash window with a keystone, and a round-headed window in the attic. Each of the other bays contains a doorway with a rectangular fanlight, over which is a window, the right one round headed over a balustrade.	II
21 and 22 Hall Garth; 54.24558°N 0.77454°W	—	Late 19th century	A pair of houses in stone, with quoins on the left, and a pantile roof. There are two storeys and attics, and each house has two bays. On the left of each house is a canted bay window, and on the right is a doorway with pilasters and a moulded entablature with carved brackets. The upper floor contains sash windows, and above is a gabled dormer on the left, and a modern dormer on the right.	II
Wesleyan Day School; 54.24552°N 0.78257°W		1856	The school, later converted for residential use, is in stone with a Welsh slate roof. It consists of three gabled blocks, the outer blocks larger and projecting. The middle block contains a doorway with a segmental-arched head. On the gable ends are large mullioned and transomed windows, and on the sides are windows with segmental heads. It is flanked by low walls to the former playground.	II
Parish hall 54.24555°N 0.77496°W		1857	Originally a school, the parish hall is in stone, and has a steeply pitched Welsh slate roof with coped gables. On the front is a gabled bellcote, many of the windows are lancets with ogival heads. At the two ends are doorways with pointed heads, above which are labels carved with "BOYS" and "GIRLS".	II
Methodist Chapel; 54.24625°N 0.78089°W		1885	The chapel is in stone, and has two storeys facing the road, with a pediment containing a circular window, and a lettered and dated band below. On the front are four bays and pilasters. The ground floor contains paired central doorways with decorated fanlights flanked by round-headed windows, all with impost bands and keystones. On the upper floor are four round-headed windows, also with impost bands and keystones.	II
Saintoft Lodge, garden shed, gate piers and railings 54.29504°N 0.79031°W		1888	The lodge is in cottage orné and Arts and Crafts styles, and is in stone with quoins and a red tile roof with terracotta ridges and finials. It has a rectangular plan with fronts of two bays. The west front, overlooking the drive, has a gabled porch and an open doorway with a depressed arch. On the south front is a canted bay window with scalloped fascia boards. At the rear is a separate single-storey garden shed, and there is a wrought iron deer park fence, with a wrought iron gate on cast iron gate posts, and curving stone walls ending in stone piers.	II
Saint Joseph's Church and church hall 54.24673°N 0.78186°W		1911	The church and church hall were designed by Leonard Stokes. The church is in stone with a tile roof, and consists of a nave, a north aisle, and a tower at the junction of the church and the hall. The hall is at a right angle and has a stone porch with a gambrel roof, a large Perpendicular-style window to the south, and hipped dormers on the roof.	II
Telephone kiosk 54.24359°N 0.77413°W		1935	The K6 type telephone kiosk in outside Eastgate Square was designed by Giles Gilbert Scott. Constructed in cast iron with a square plan and a dome, it has three unperforated crowns in the top panels.	II
