= Black Swan Inn =

Pub in Pickering, North Yorkshire, England

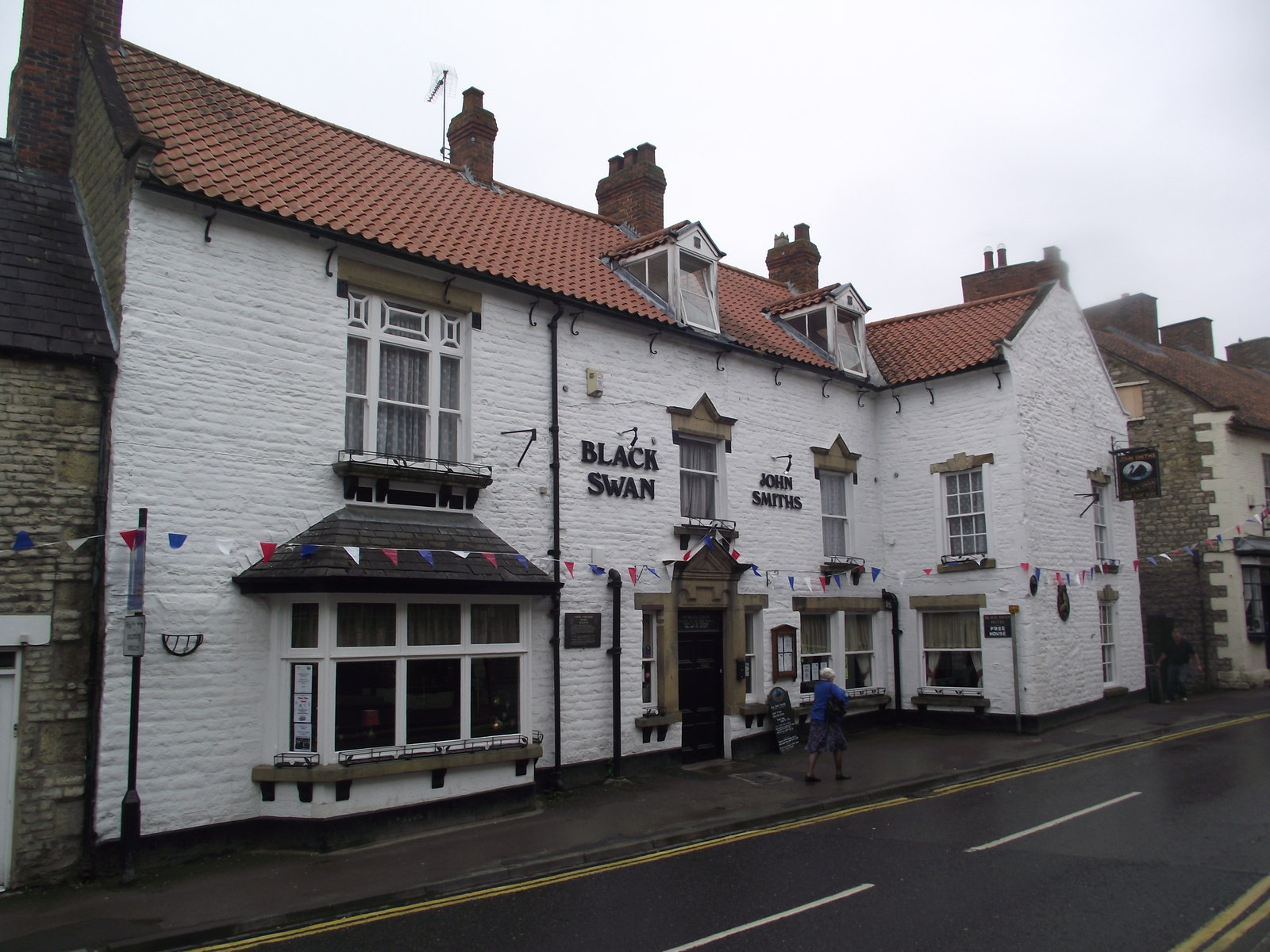
The pub, in 2012

The Black Swan Inn is a historic pub in Pickering, North Yorkshire, a town in England.

The pub was built as a coaching inn, in about 1740. Most of the windows were replaced in the 19th century. In 1836, the pub hosted a banquet for 300 dignitaries to celebrate the opening of the Whitby and Pickering Railway. Other guests included Charles Dickens and Rex Whistler. At one time, the current dining room housed the town's court. The building was grade II listed in 1975. In the early 21st century, the pub was a free house owned by Enterprise Inns. In 2015, its freehold was purchased by a local couple, who restored the building and planned to install a brewery.

The pub is built of painted stone, and has a pantile roof with stone coped gables and kneelers. It has two storeys and an L-shaped plan, with a main range of three bays, and a projecting cross-wing on the right. The left bay in the main range contains a canted bay window, and a three-light sash window above. The middle bay contains a doorway, and on the upper floor are two sash windows, all with shaped surrounds. The upper window in the cross-wing has a triple keystone, and on the main range are two modern dormers. Inside, the dining room has dressed stone walls and a wood-burning stove, and the main bar has wooden beams.

== See also ==
- Listed buildings in Pickering, North Yorkshire
