= Beck Isle Museum =

Social history museum in Pickering, North Yorkshire, England

Beck Isle Museum of Rural Life
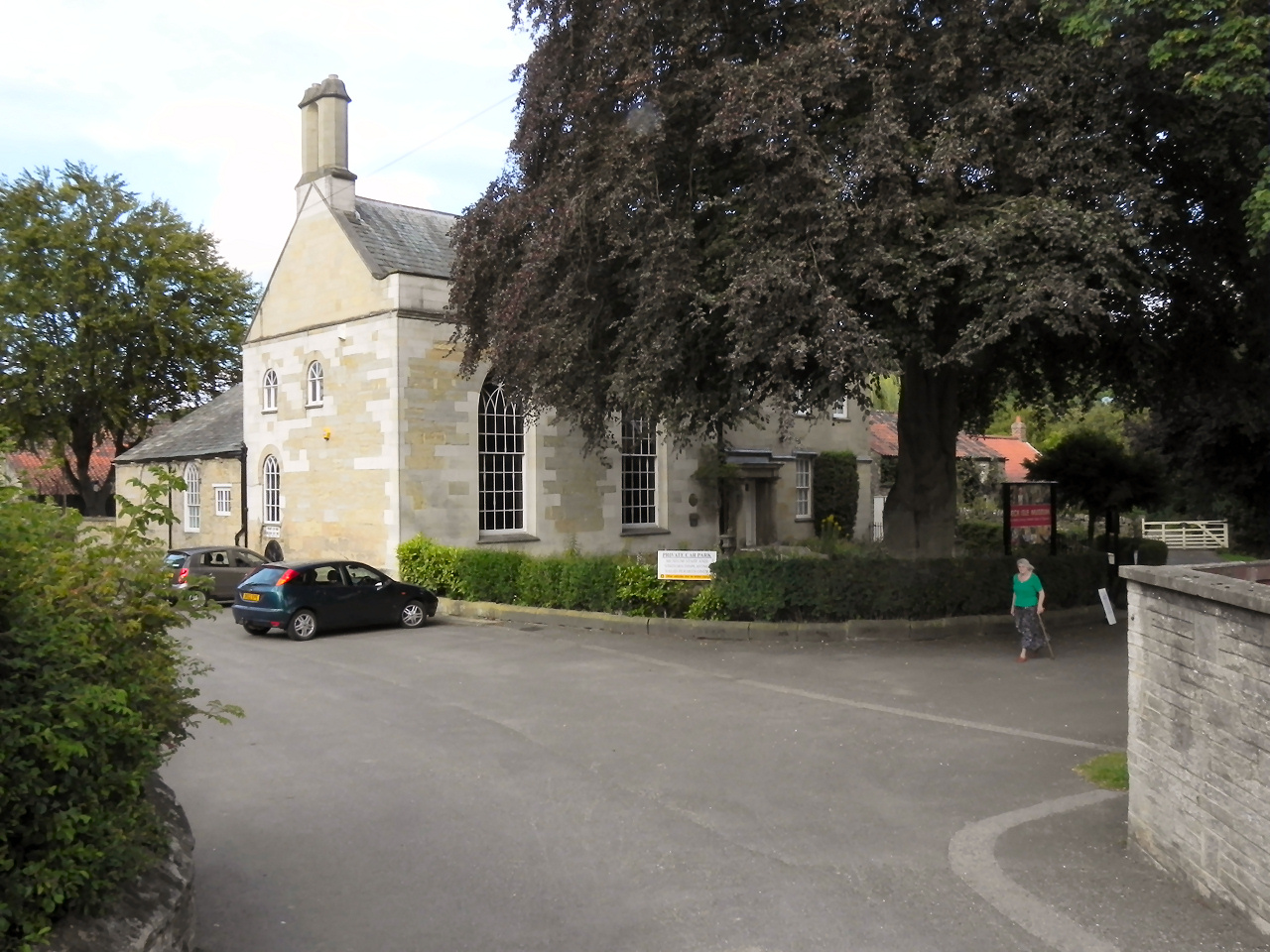
- Beck Isle Museum
- Established: 1967
- Location: Pickering, North Yorkshire, England
- Coordinates: 54.246332°N 0.781317°W
- Accreditation: Arts Council England (AN:1359)
- Collection size: 60,000 objects
- Public transit access: Pickering (NYMR)
- Website: www.beckislemuseum.org.uk

Listed Building – Grade II*
- Designated: 12 May 1969
- Reference no.: 1315853

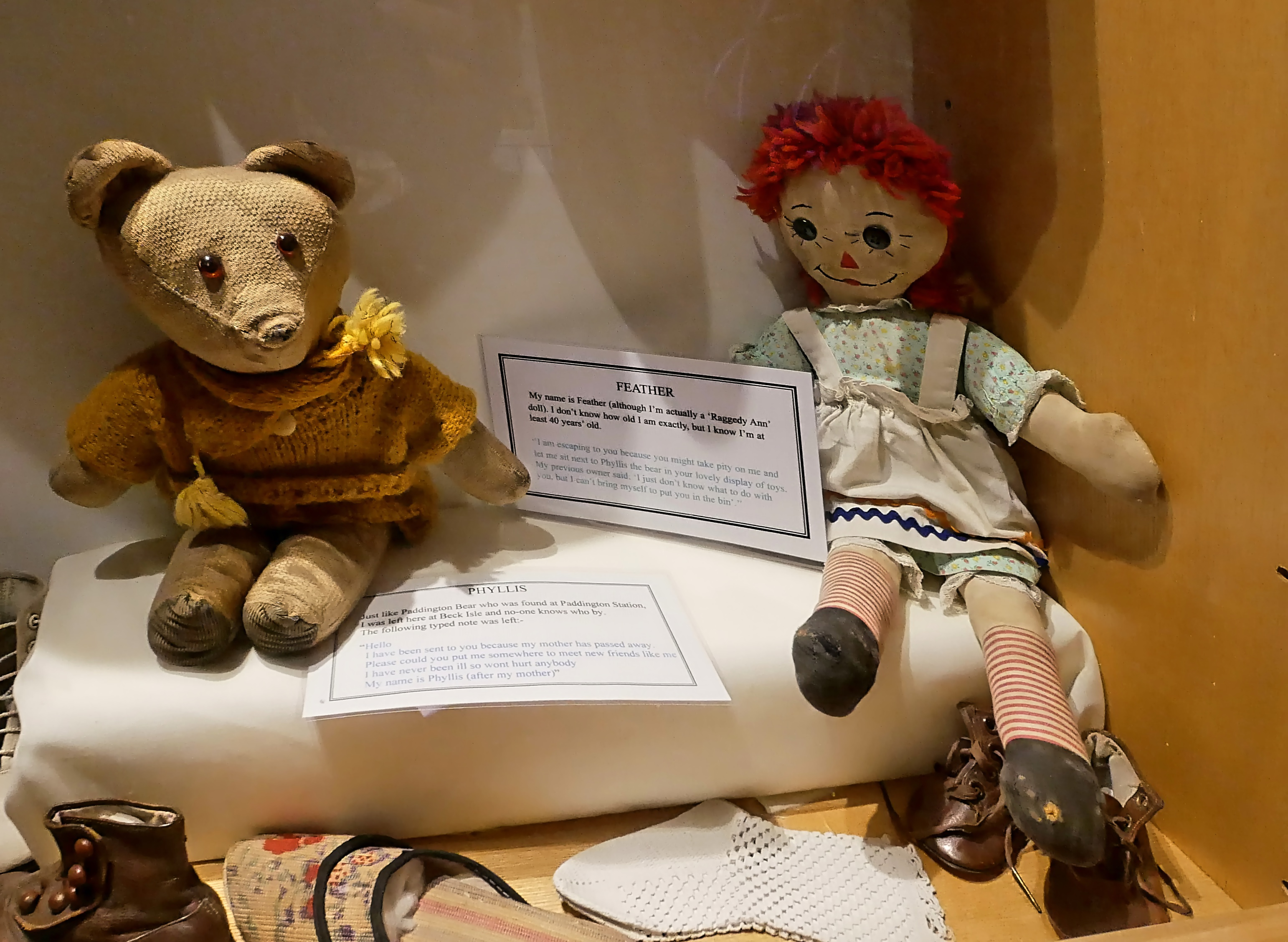
Puppets on display

The Beck Isle Museum of Rural Life is a social history museum in Pickering, North Yorkshire, England. The museum features period business displays including the shops of a barber, blacksmith, chemist, cobbler, cooper, printer, gentleman's draper, dairy, and hardware store. There is also a Victorian-era pub and parlour, and a historic costume gallery.

Its collection is housed in a fine regency period Grade II* listed mansion with farm outbuildings. Among the collections are the photography and photographic equipment of Sydney Smith (1884–1958), noted photographer of Pickering. Despite poor eyesight due to a childhood affliction with measles, Smith developed a love of photography, opening a photographic business in the 1900s and operating it with his wife, Maud, until World War I. Maud ran the shop while Smith fought in World War I, and after his return from the war he "gave up photography in order to run a garage on Park Street", though he continued to "spend all his spare time taking photographs".

The images from the collection number several thousand, and a number are on display throughout the museum. Most of the images date from the 1920s to the late 1940s and are of Pickering and the surrounding villages, events, and local people. Smith's collection was described in 2000 as presenting "a remarkable picture of the Rydale area as it was more than half a century ago."

== See also ==
- Grade II* listed buildings in North Yorkshire (district)
- Listed buildings in Pickering, North Yorkshire

== Gallery ==
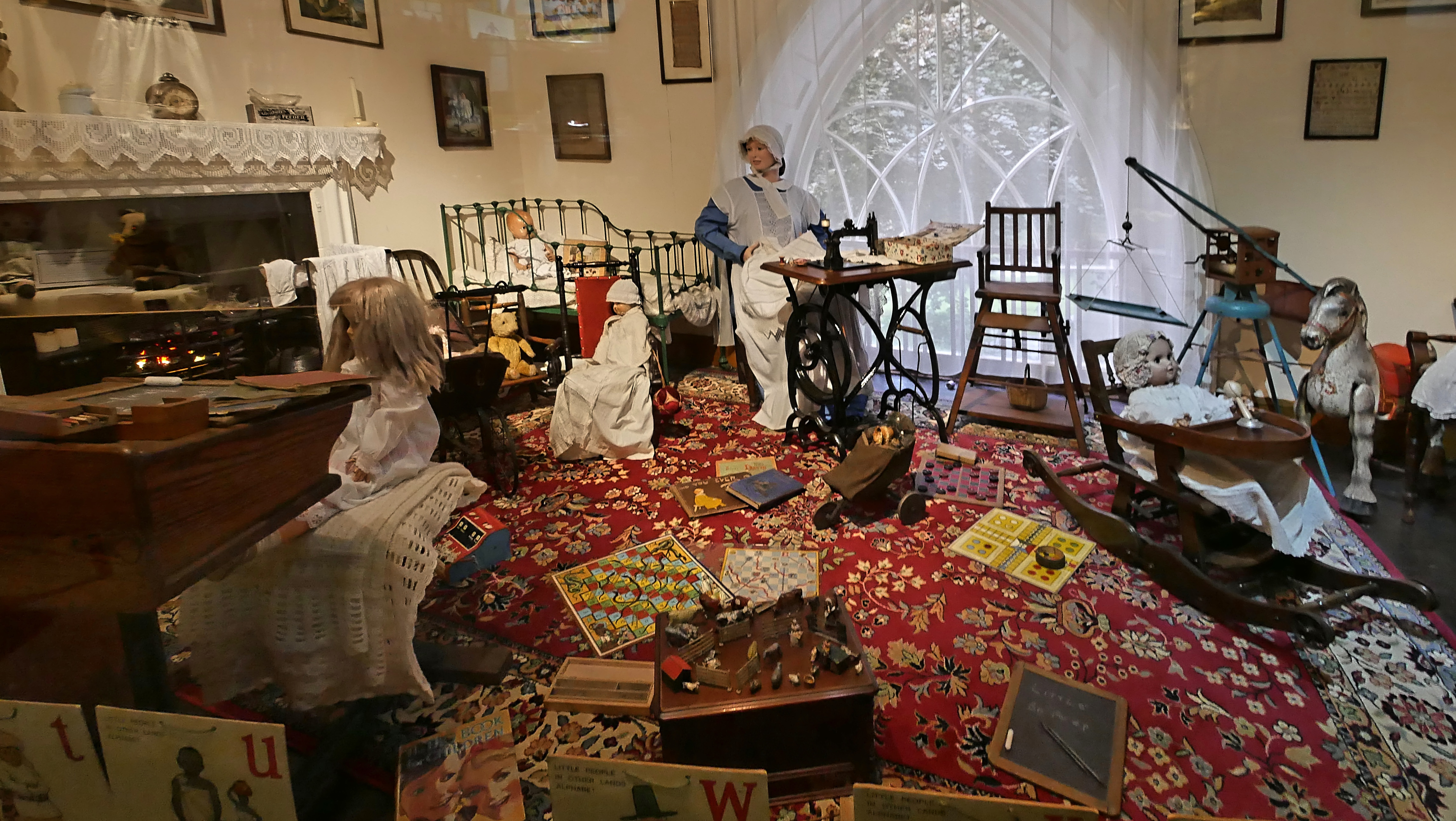
Living room

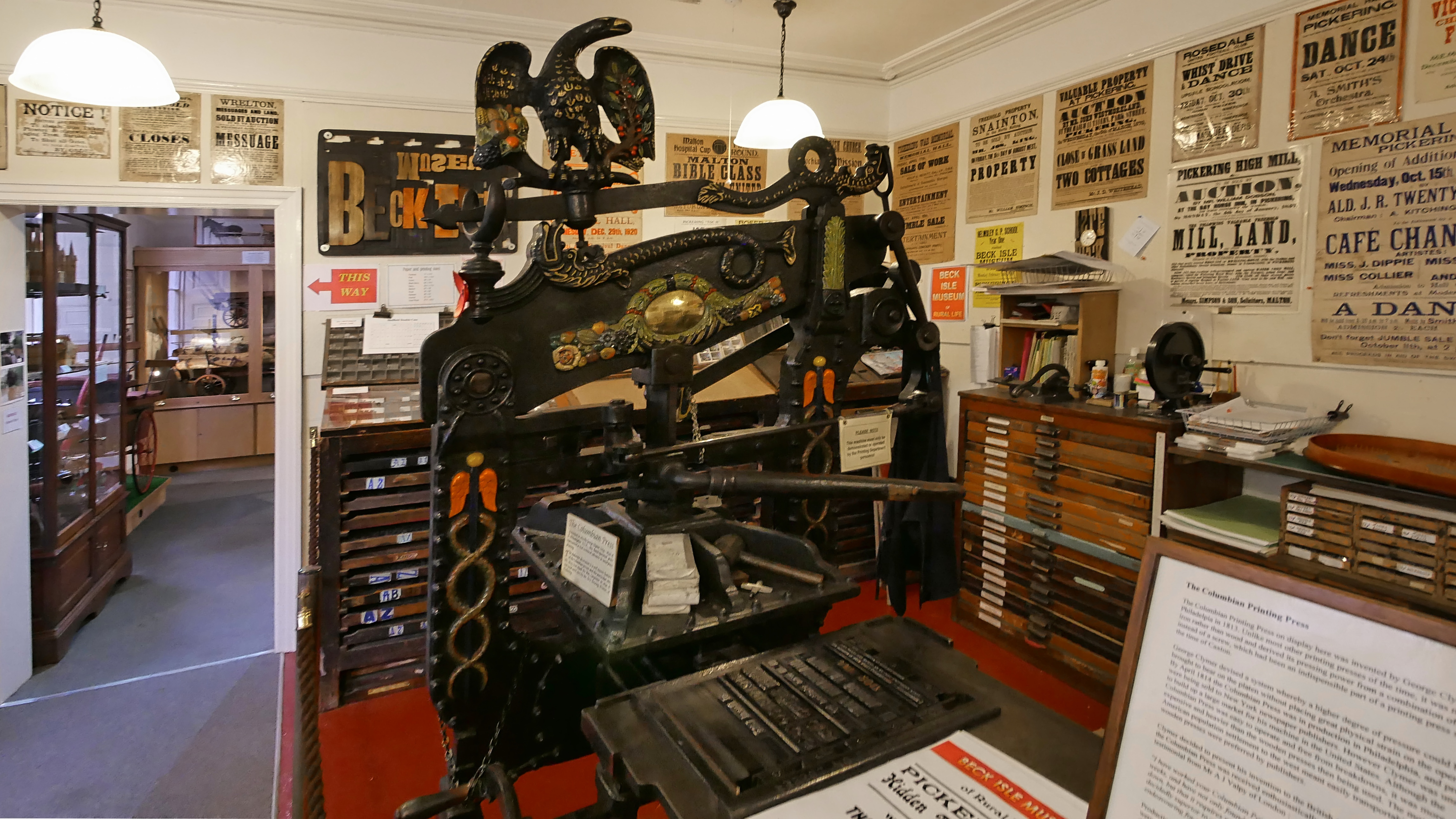
Press

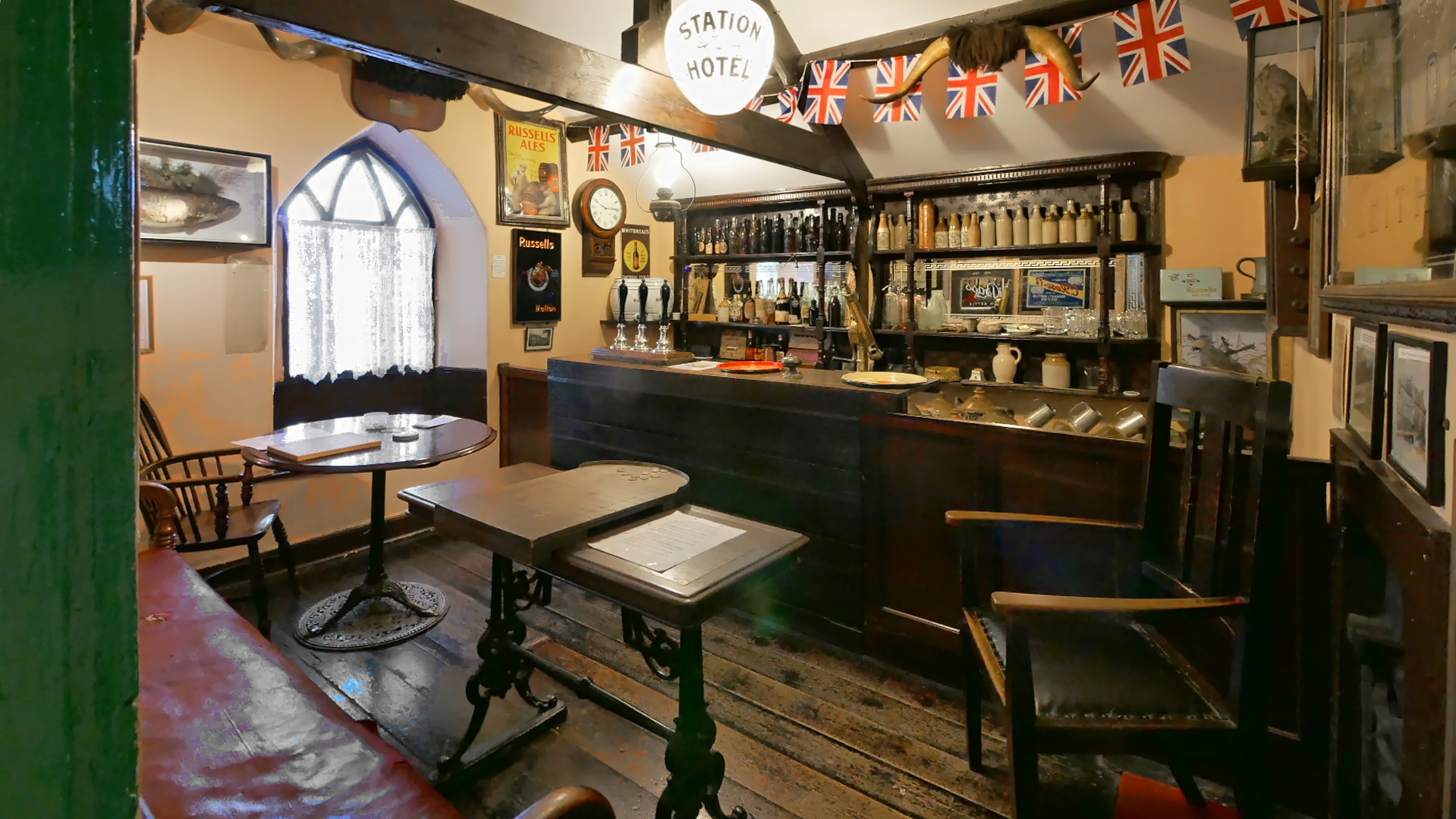
Station Hotel

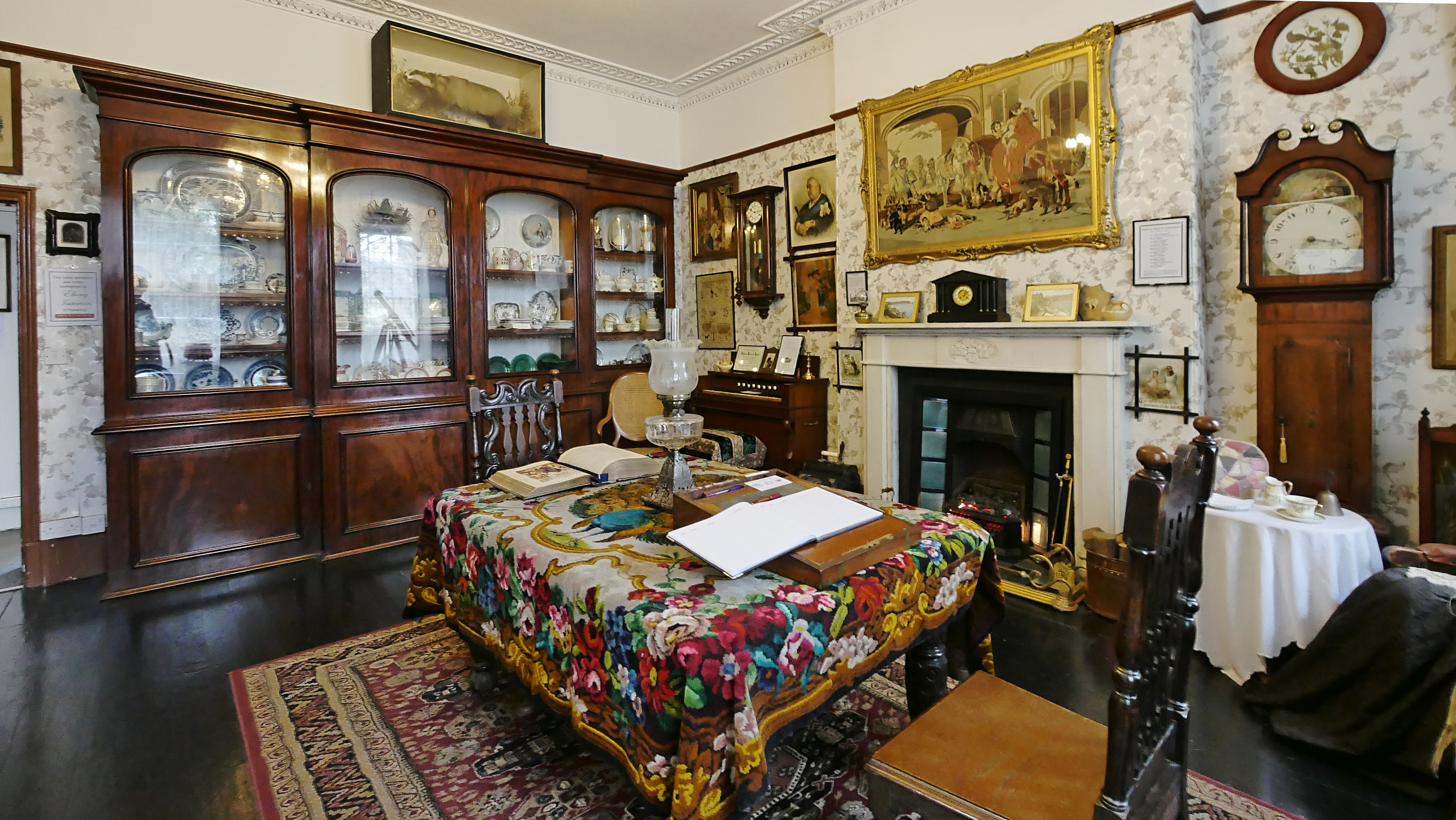
Living room

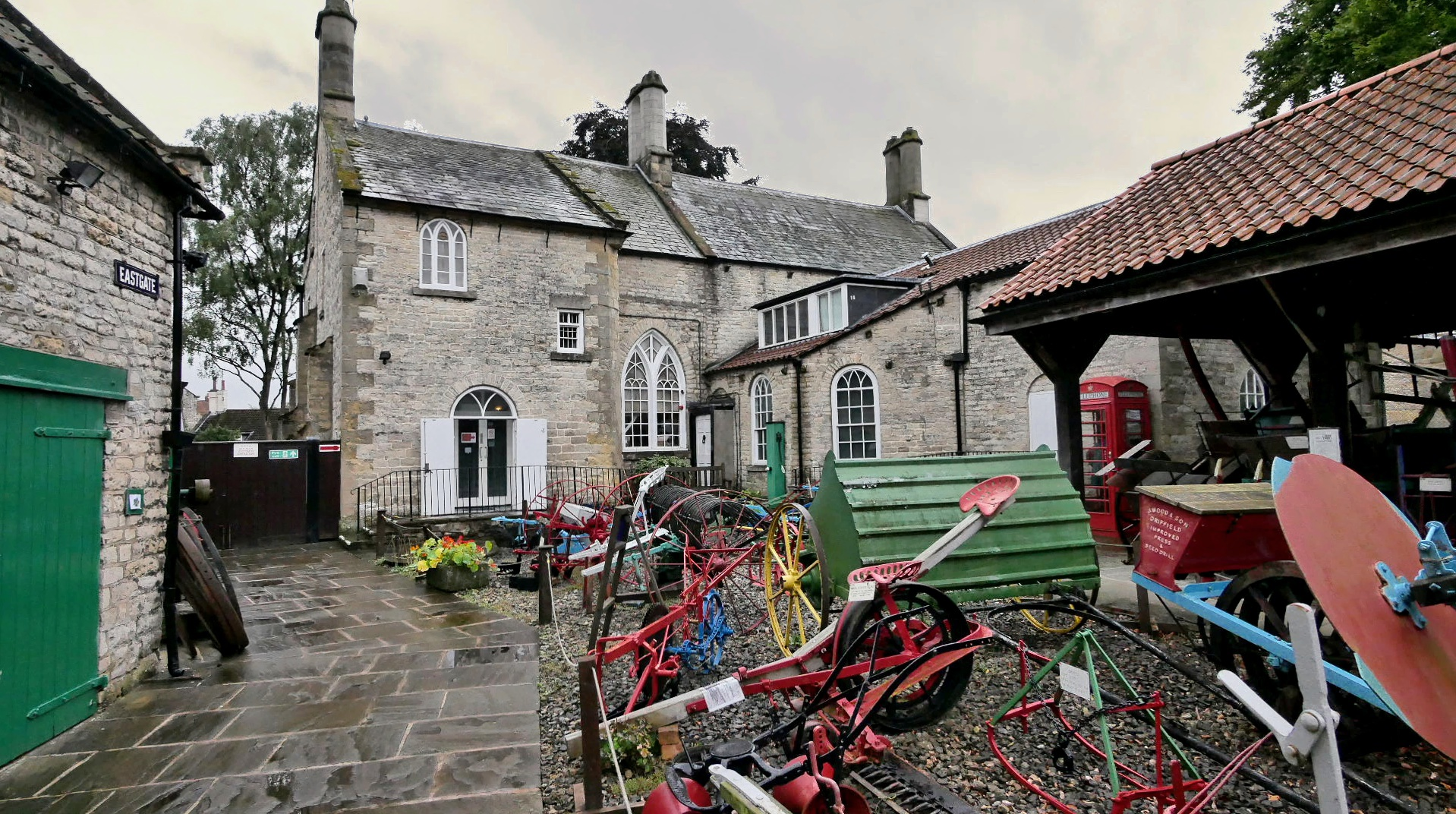
Inner court yard

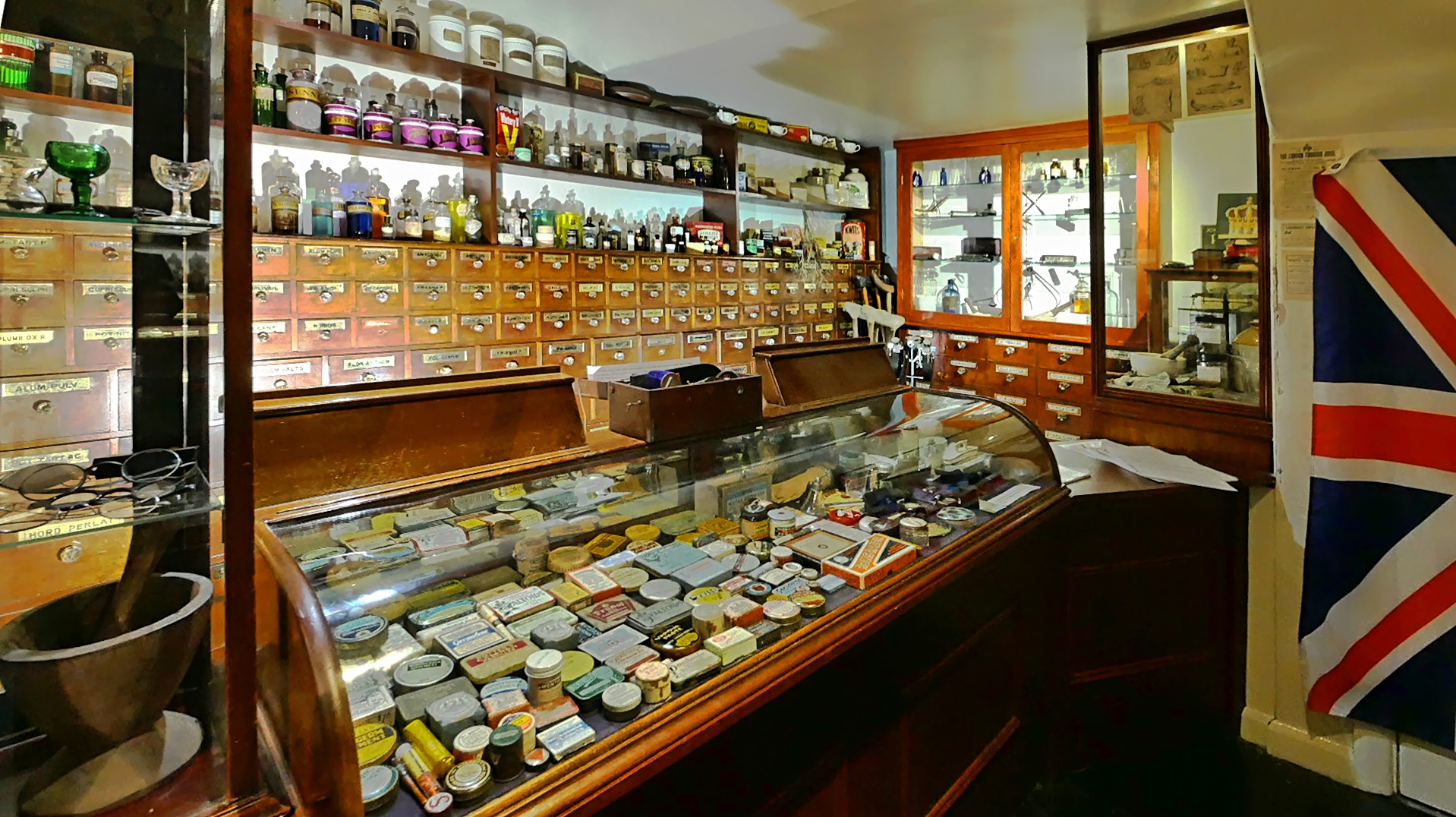
Pharmacy

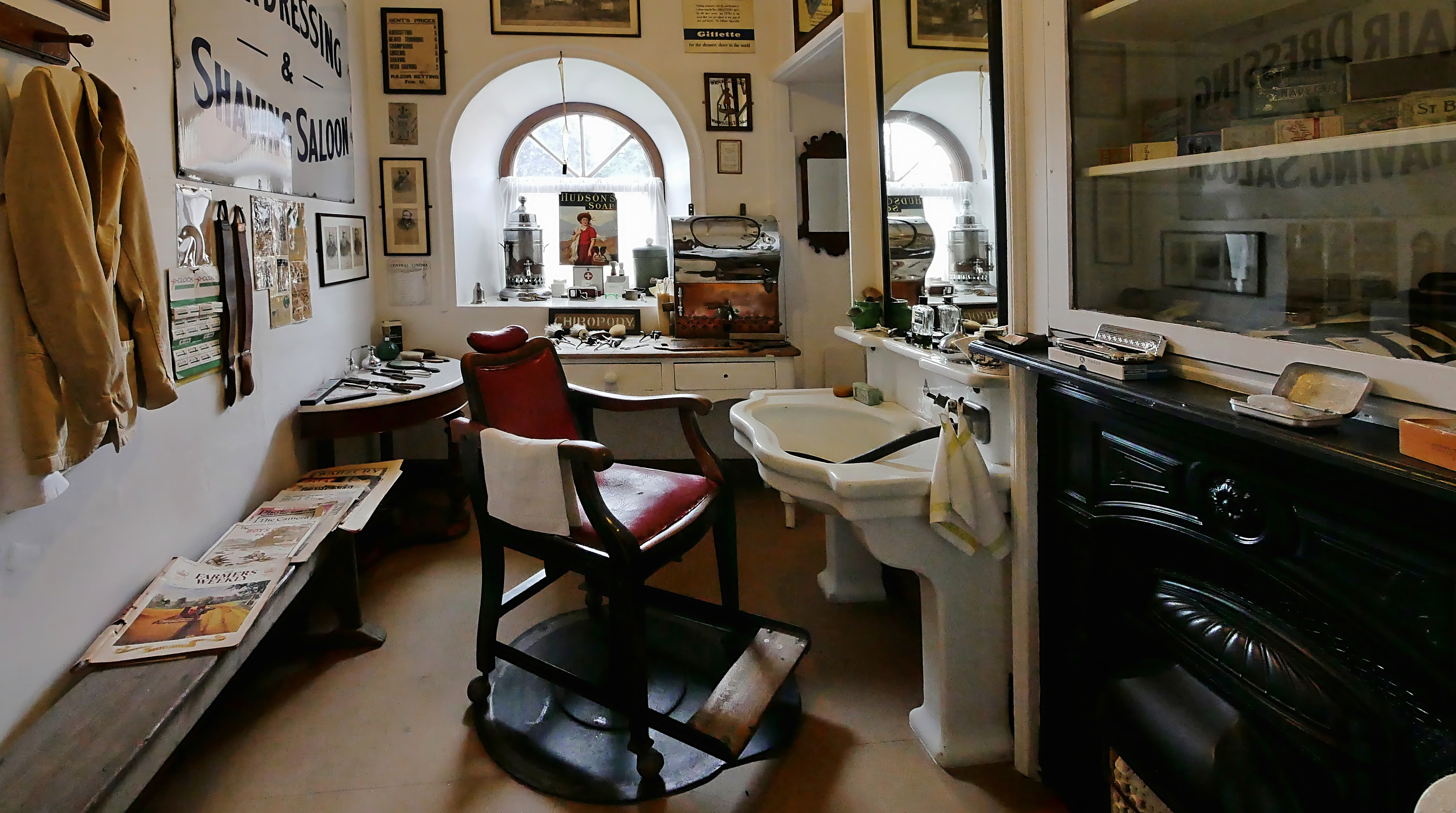
Hairdresser

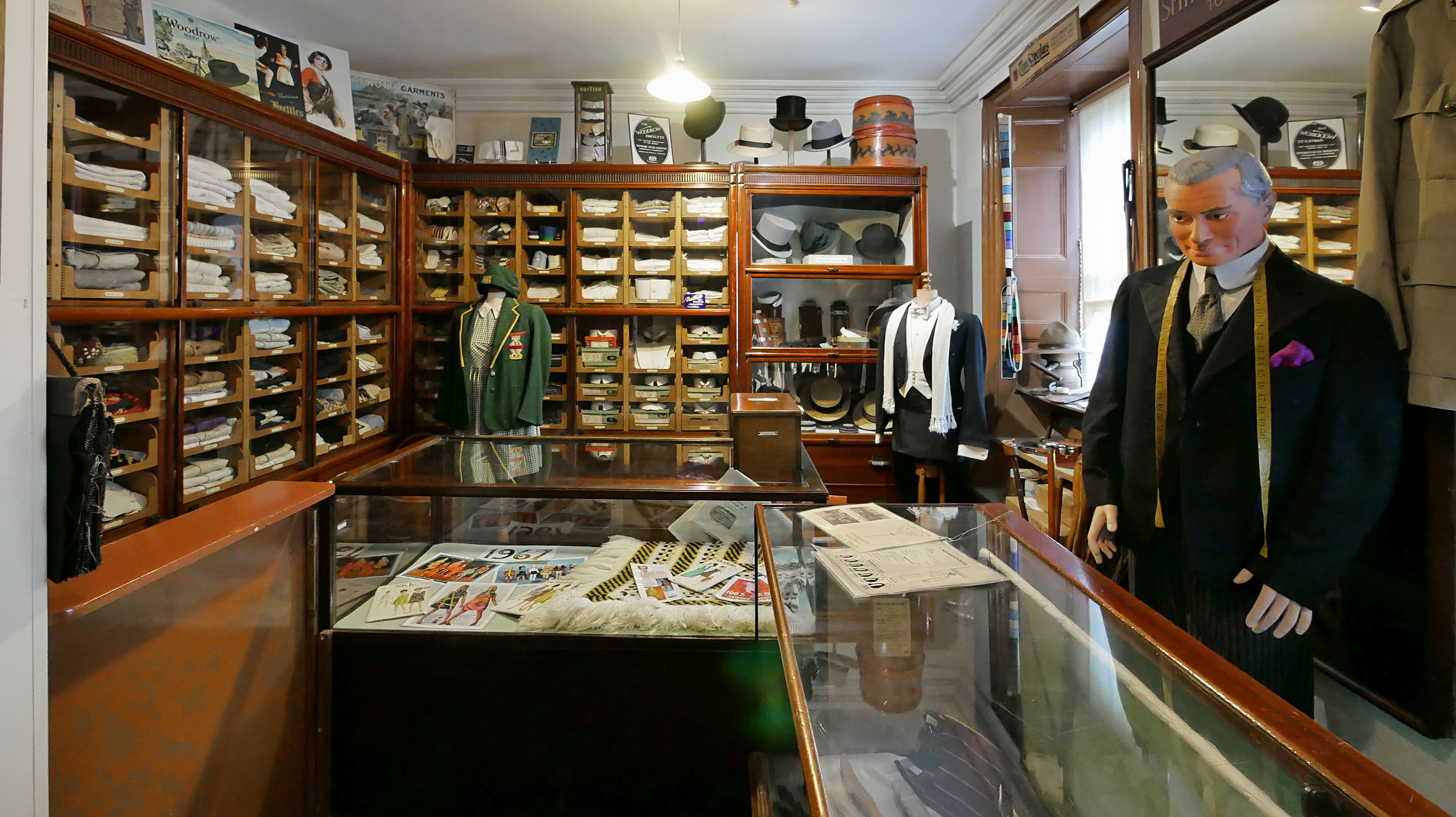
Tailor
