= Pickering Bridge =

Bridge in Pickering, North Yorkshire, England

Coordinates: 54°14′48″N 0°46′47″W

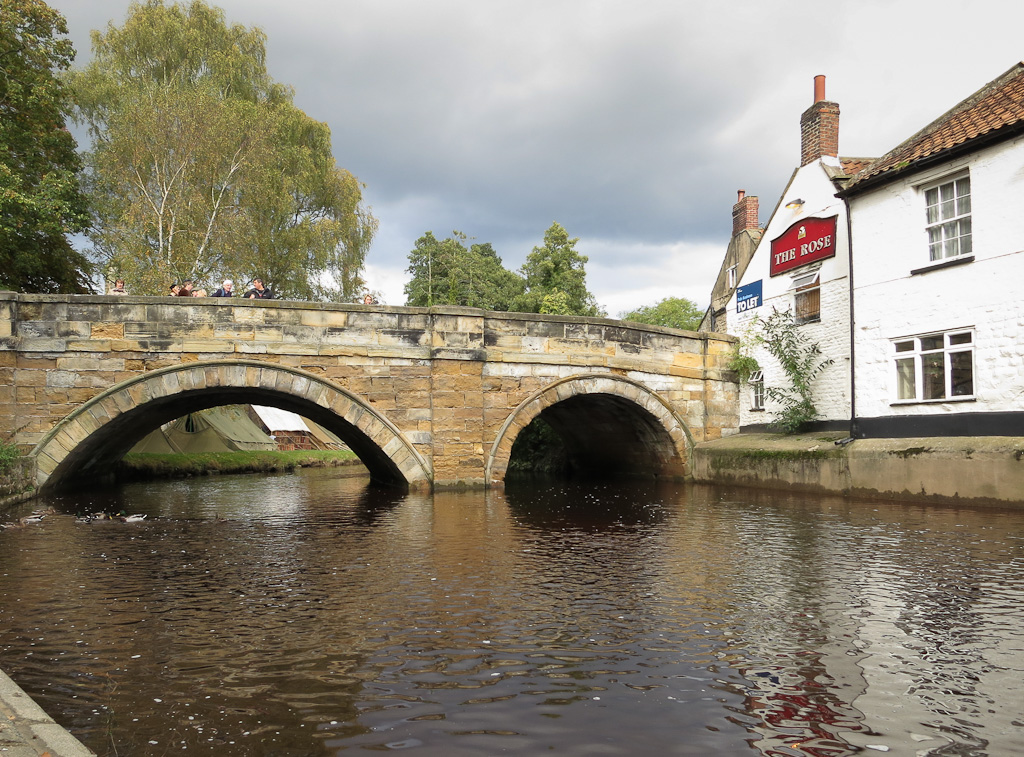
The bridge, in 2012

Pickering Bridge is a historic bridge in Pickering, North Yorkshire, a town in England.

The bridge carries Bridge Street across Pickering Beck, at the western end of the town's market place. A stone bridge was first recorded in 1476, and was also mentioned by John Leland. One arch of the Mediaeval bridge survives, while the remainder of the bridge was rebuilt in the 18th century. The bridge was grade II listed in 1950.

The bridge is built of stone and has four arches, with the Mediaeval arch being ribbed. The centre arch is segmental, and the others are smaller flanking flood arches with pilasters between.

== See also ==
- Listed buildings in Pickering, North Yorkshire
