= Amotherby railway station =

Disused railway station in North Yorkshire, England

Amotherby
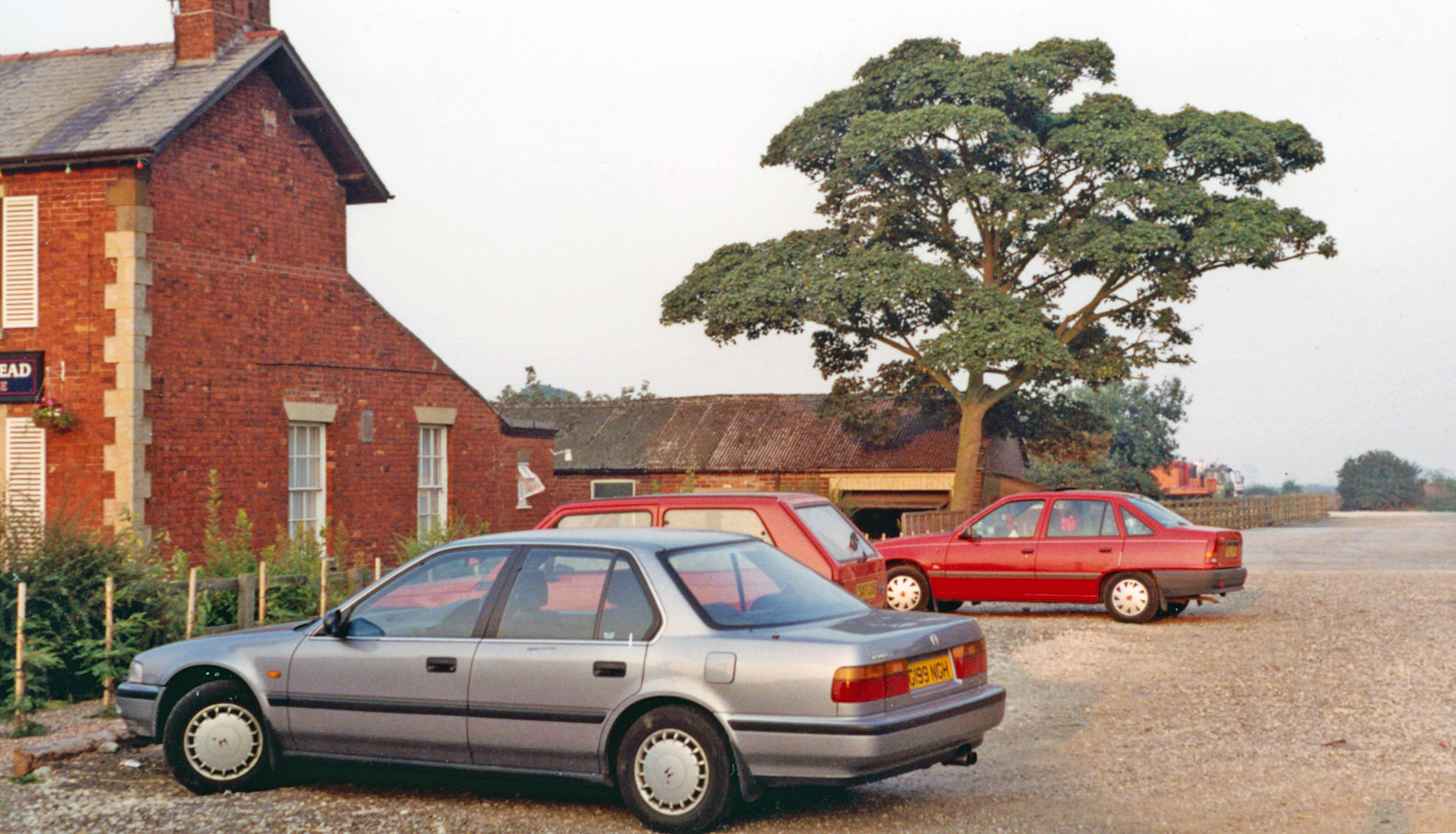
- Site of the former station in August 1991. None of the station buildings remain.

General information
- Location: Amotherby, North Yorkshire; England
- Coordinates: 54.1546°N 0.8530°W
- Grid reference: SE750738
- Platforms: 1

Other information
- Status: Disused

History
- Original company: York, Newcastle and Berwick Railway
- Pre-grouping: North Eastern Railway
- Post-grouping: London and North Eastern Railway

Key dates
- 19 May 1853: Station opened
- 1 January 1931: Station closed to passengers
- 17 October 1964: Station closed to goods
Location

Amotherby railway station served the village of Amotherby in the Northern English county of North Yorkshire. It was located on a local line which ran from Malton to a junction with the Gilling and Pickering line in Gilling.

== History ==
Opened by the York, Newcastle and Berwick Railway, then absorbed by the North Eastern Railway the station joined the London and North Eastern Railway during the Grouping of 1923. This company closed the station to passengers in 1930, although the goods service then passed on to the Eastern Region of British Railways upon nationalisation in 1948. Special and excursion passenger trains used the station until 27 July 1964, the last ramblers excursion to Kirbymoorside running on 3 May 1964, and the last passenger train was a Sunday school excursion. Most of the line closed to freight on 10 August 1964, but Amotherby station remained open until 17 October 1964 to honour a long-term contract with a local mill. Thus the 3 1/2-mile (5.6 km) long section between Amotherby and Malton was the last part of the Thirsk and Malton line to close.

Preceding station	Disused railways	Following station
Barton le Street; Line and station closed	North Eastern Railway; Thirsk and Malton Line	Malton; Line closed, station open
