= Ampleforth railway station =

Disused railway station in North Yorkshire, England

Ampleforth
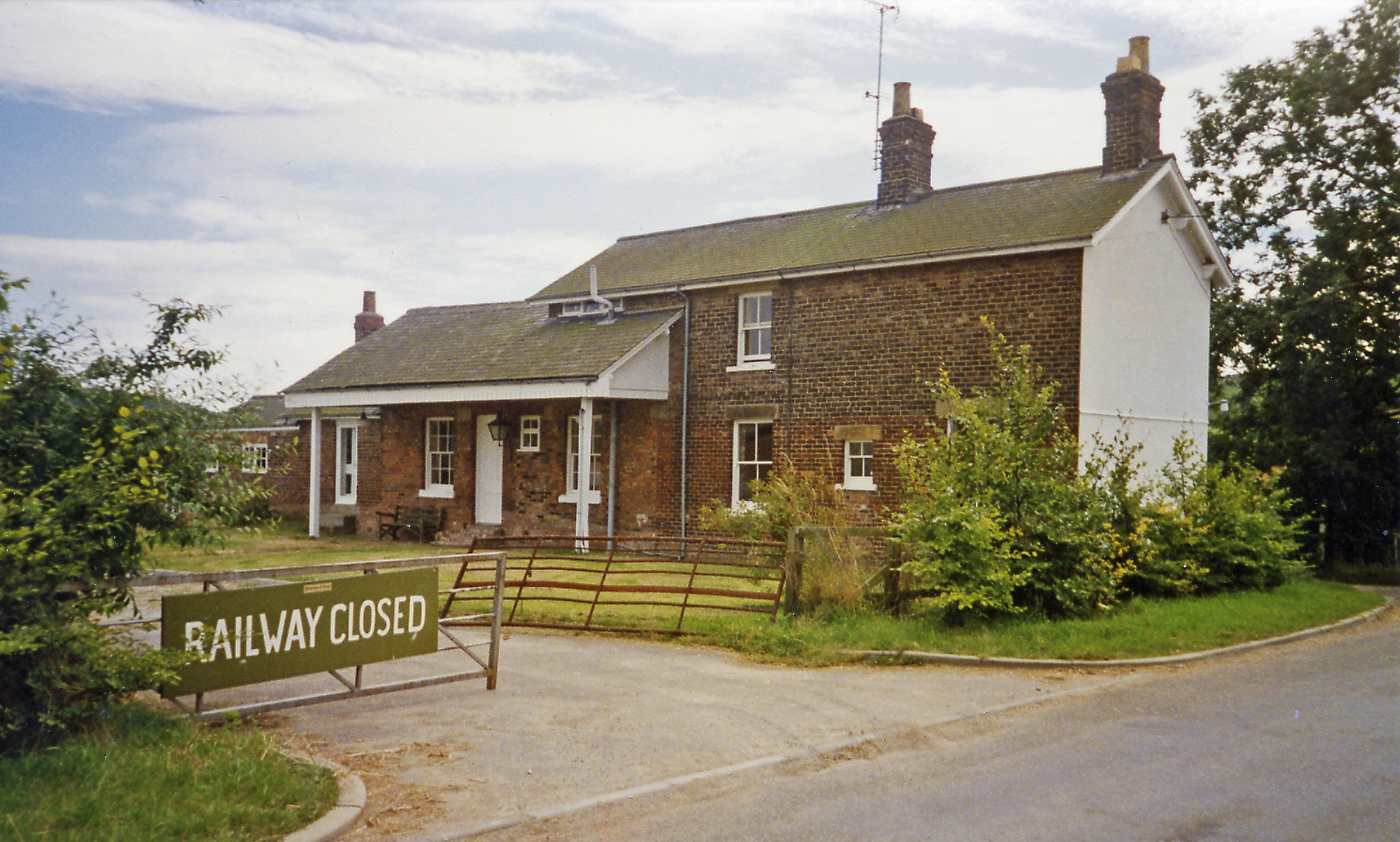
- Station building in August 1993

General information
- Location: Ampleforth, North Yorkshire; England
- Coordinates: 54.1830°N 1.1207°W
- Grid reference: SE574767
- Platforms: 1

Other information
- Status: Disused

History
- Original company: York, Newcastle and Berwick Railway
- Pre-grouping: North Eastern Railway
- Post-grouping: London and North Eastern Railway

Key dates
- 19 May 1853: Station opened
- 5 June 1950: Station closed
Location

Ampleforth railway station, served the village of Ampleforth, in the Northern English county of North Yorkshire. It was located on a line which ran from Pickering to the East Coast Main Line at Thirsk. The station was close to the noted Ampleforth College although passengers for the college used the station at Gilling further east as this was more convenient for onward transfer to the college.

== History ==
Opened by the York, Newcastle and Berwick Railway in May 1853, then absorbed by the North Eastern Railway the station joined the London and North Eastern Railway during the Grouping of 1923. The station passed to the Eastern Region of British Railways on nationalisation in 1948.

The station was located 8 miles (13 km) east of Sessay Wood Junction on the East Coast Main Line and 12 miles (19 km) west of Malton. Ampleforth station was quite small as it was some 1 3/4 miles (2.8 km) distant from Ampleforth village and most passengers and traffic for the college alighted at, or were loaded at, Gilling station further east, which was also the terminus for the Ampleforth College Tramway. The station consisted of one running line with one platform and a small goods yard which forwarded mostly livestock and potatoes with coal being the most common inward commodity.

On 30 December 1865, a Gilling to Thirsk passenger train was running non-stop through the station when it was routed off the running line and onto the station siding. At the time, some builders were loading roof tiles onto their truck and one of them was killed. It was later determined that the points were set incorrectly for the siding and as the engine was running tender first, the driver's sight of the track ahead was hindered.

The station was closed by the British Transport Commission in June 1950, three years before the rest of the stations on the line were closed down. Following closure the station saw use as a camping cottage until 1962.

Preceding station	Disused railways	Following station
Coxwold; Line and station closed	North Eastern Railway; Gilling and Pickering Line	Gilling; Line and station closed
Coxwold; Line and station closed	North Eastern Railway; Thirsk and Malton Line	Gilling; Line and station closed
