= Barton-le-Street =

Village and civil parish in North Yorkshire, England

Coordinates: 54.15940°N 0.89605°W

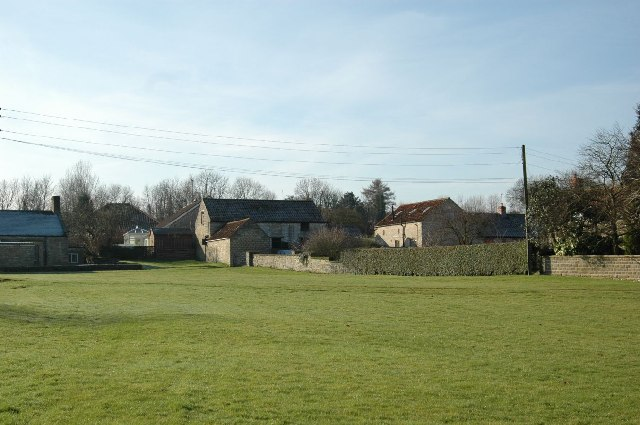
- Village green at Barton-le-Street

- Location within North Yorkshire
- Population: 170
- OS grid reference: SE721742
- Civil parish: Barton-le-Street
- Unitary authority: North Yorkshire
- Ceremonial county: North Yorkshire
- Region: Yorkshire and the Humber
- Country: England
- Sovereign state: United Kingdom
- Post town: MALTON
- Postcode district: YO17
- Police: North Yorkshire
- Fire: North Yorkshire
- Ambulance: Yorkshire
- UK Parliament: Thirsk and Malton

Barton-le-Street is a village and civil parish in North Yorkshire, England. According to the 2001 census the parish had a population of 186 reducing to 170 at the 2011 Census. It is located about five miles west of Malton, between Appleton-le-Street and Slingsby on the old Roman road which is now the B1257.

== History ==
The village is recorded as Bartun in the Domesday Book. It lay within the Maneshou Hundred and was in the possession of the King having previously been owned by Earl Morcar. The village name is Anglo-Saxon and derived from bere, meaning barley and tun meaning settlement. The suffix of "le-Street" denotes that it was situated on an old Roman road.

== Governance ==
The village lies within the Thirsk and Malton parliamentary constituency. It was part of the Ryedale district from 1974 until 2023.

It is within the Amotherby and Ampleforth electoral division of North Yorkshire Council.

The civil parish also includes the hamlet of Butterwick. According to the 2001 UK census the parish population was 186. There are 82 dwellings of which all but one were occupied. Of the total population, 158 were over 16 years old of which 92 were in employment.

== Geography ==
The village lies 5.5 miles (8.9 km) west of Malton on the B1257 between Appleton-le-Street to the east and Slingsby to the west. The area is made of undulating hills on limestone bedrock covered by clay. It is surrounding by farmland, mostly for crop growing. The village used to have a station on the Thirsk and Malton Line used to pass through the village and the Old Station buildings, now the Village Hall, can be found on the north side on the road to Butterwick. The village is served by the Malton to Helmsley bus service.

== Education ==
There is no longer a school in the village and the nearest Primary education is to be found at Amotherby Community Primary School or Slinsgby Community Primary School. Secondary education is provided at Malton School.

== Religion ==
St Michael's Church, Barton-le-Street was re-built in 1871 on the same site of the previous Norman church believed to have been built around 1160.

== See also ==
- Listed buildings in Barton-le-Street

== Gallery ==
Views of Barton-le-Street
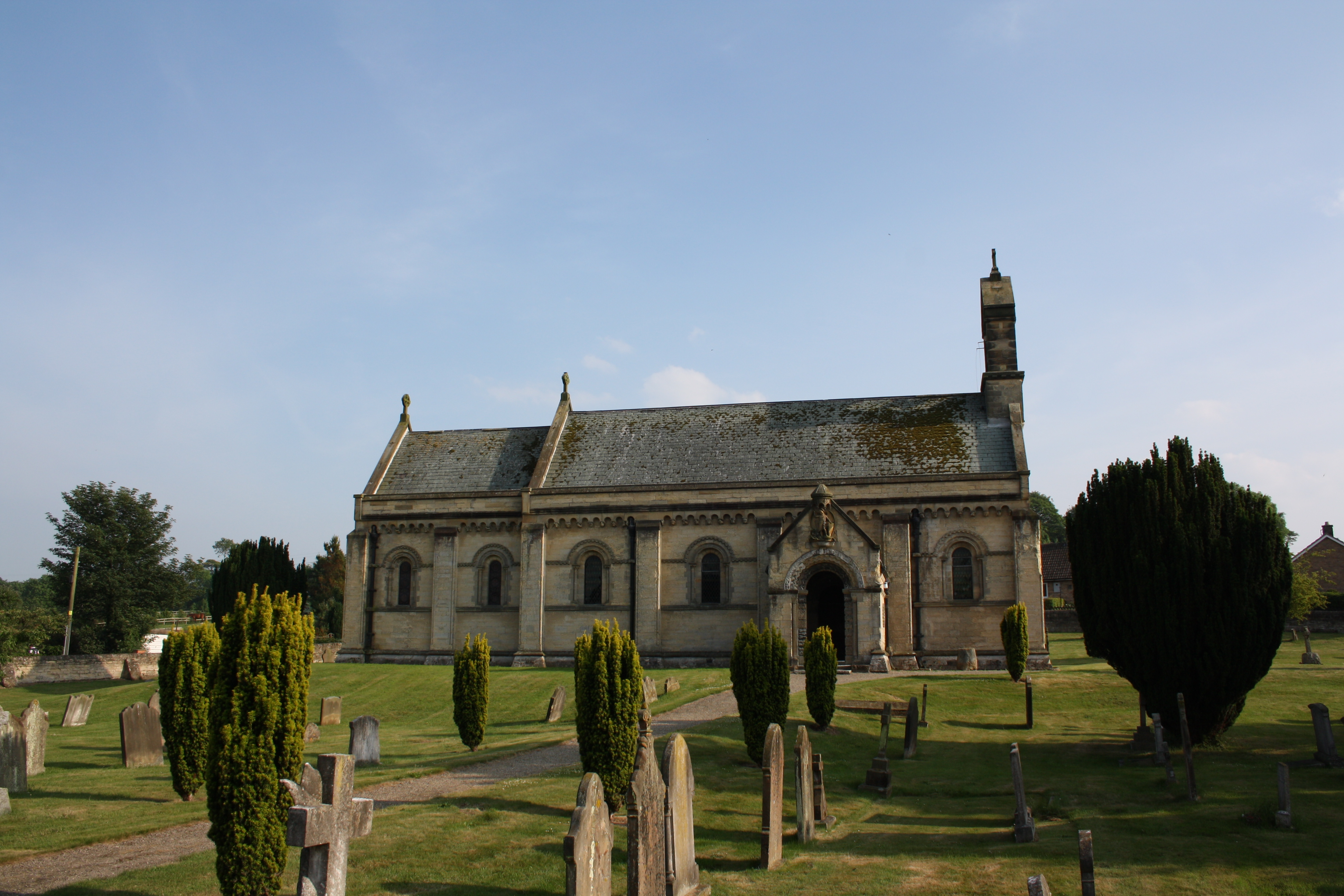
St Michael and All Angels Church

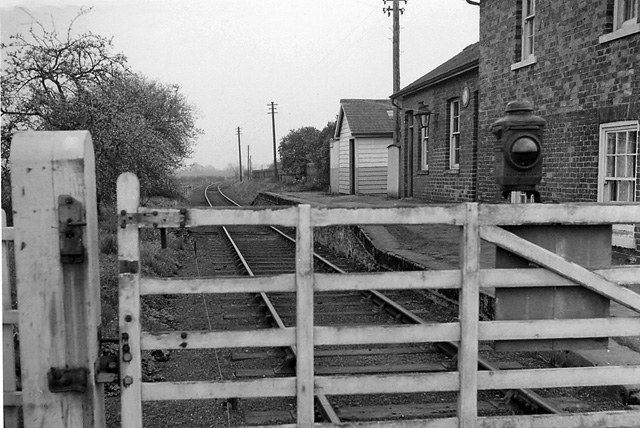
Until 1931 there was a railway station, seen here in 1961, on the North Eastern Railway
