= Holy Epiphany Church =

Holy Epiphany Church may refer to:

- Holy Epiphany Church, Butterwick
- Holy Epiphany Church, Muscliff
