= Barton le Street railway station =

Disused railway station in North Yorkshire, England

Barton le Street
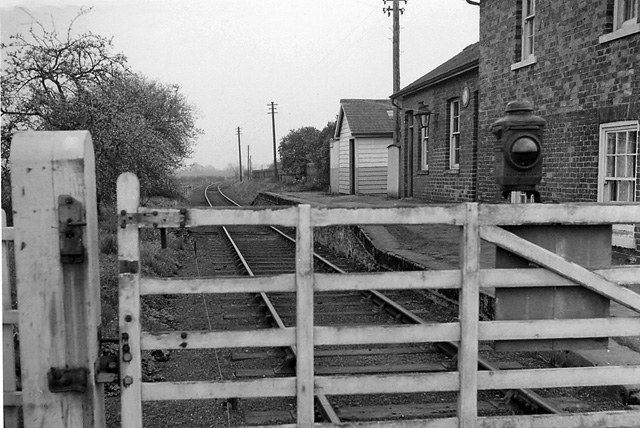
- Barton le Street station looking east in April 1961

General information
- Location: Barton le Street, North Yorkshire; England
- Coordinates: 54.1624°N 0.8914°W
- Platforms: 1

Other information
- Status: Disused

History
- Original company: York, Newcastle and Berwick Railway
- Pre-grouping: North Eastern Railway
- Post-grouping: London and North Eastern Railway

Key dates
- 19 May 1853: Station opened
- 1 January 1931: Station closed to Passengers
- 7 August 1964: Station closed to Goods
Location

Barton le Street railway station, served the village of Barton le Street, in North Yorkshire, England. It was located on the Thirsk and Malton railway line which ran between the two towns.

== History ==
Opened by the York, Newcastle and Berwick Railway on 19 May 1853, it was then absorbed by the North Eastern Railway. In 1923, the station became part of the London and North Eastern Railway during the Grouping. By the time the company closed the station to passengers on 1 January 1931, the passenger service had been downgraded to run between Malton and Gilling only, although the goods services continued as with the rest of the line until final closure on 10 August 1964.

Preceding station	Disused railways	Following station
Slingsby; Line and station closed	North Eastern Railway; Thirsk and Malton Line	Amotherby; Line closed, station closed
