= Coxwold railway station =

Disused railway station in North Yorkshire, England

Coxwold
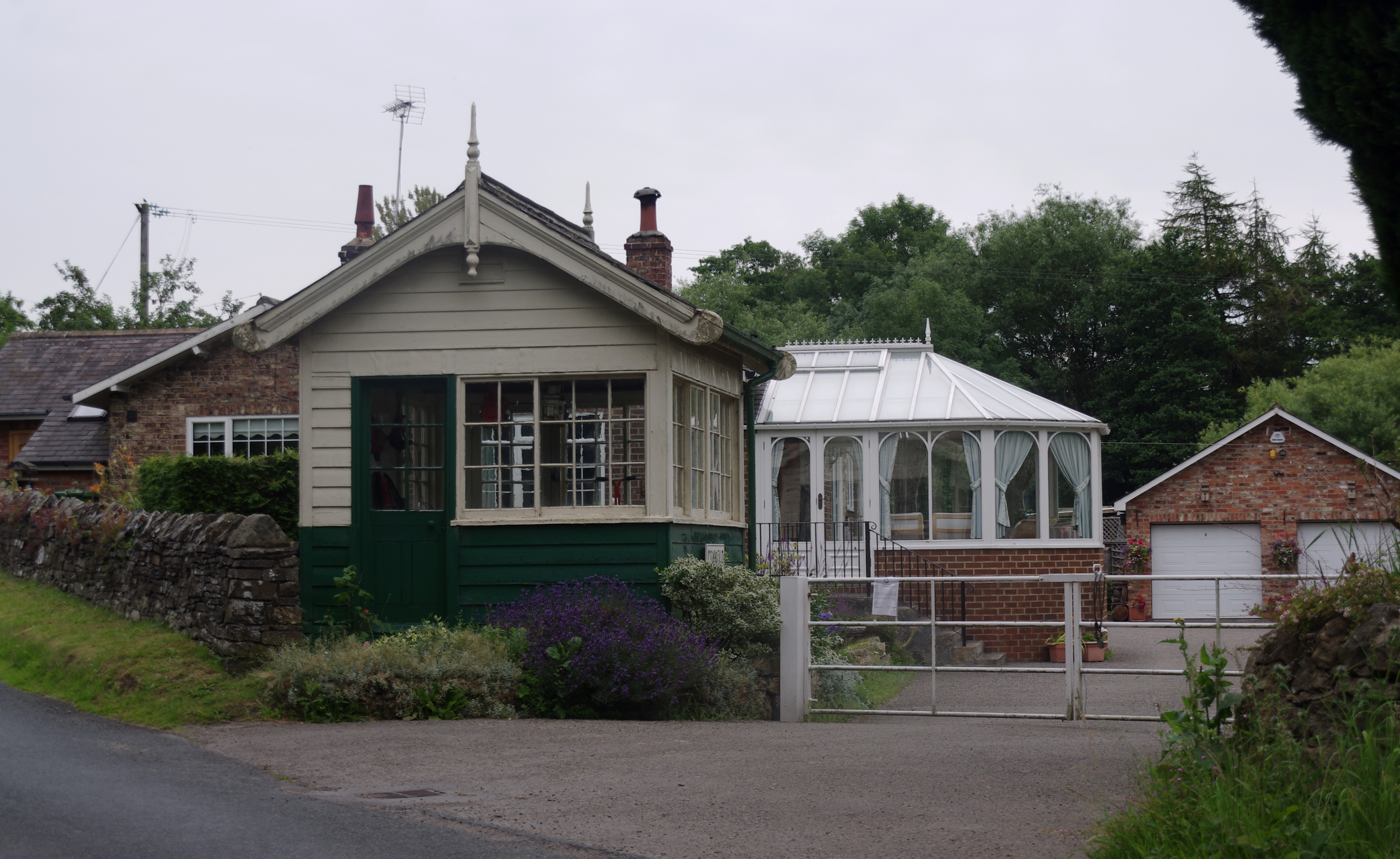
- The remains of Coxwold station viewed from the road in July 2011

General information
- Location: Coxwold, North Yorkshire; England
- Coordinates: 54.186379°N 1.179142°W
- Grid reference: SE536770
- Platforms: 2

Other information
- Status: Disused

History
- Original company: York, Newcastle and Berwick Railway
- Pre-grouping: North Eastern Railway
- Post-grouping: London and North Eastern Railway

Key dates
- 1 June 1853: opened
- 2 February 1953: closed for regular passenger trains
- 10 August 1964: closed completely
Location

Coxwold railway station was on the Thirsk and Malton line of the York, Newcastle and Berwick Railway in North Yorkshire, England that served the village of Coxwold. The station opened on 1 June 1853.

The station was host to a camping coach from 1935 to 1939, and possibly one for some of 1934, the station was also used as an overnight stop for touring camping coach service in 1935.

The station closed for regular passenger traffic in 1953 but was subsequently used for occasional special trains until 1958.

The line remained open for goods traffic until 10 August 1964, after which the track was subsequently lifted.

The station has since been converted into a private house.

Preceding station	Disused railways	Following station
Husthwaite Gate; Line and station closed	North Eastern Railway; Gilling and Pickering Line	Ampleforth; Line and station closed
Husthwaite Gate; Line and station closed	North Eastern Railway; Thirsk and Malton Line	Ampleforth; Line and station closed
