= Ampleforth (disambiguation) =

Ampleforth is a village in North Yorkshire, England.

Ampleforth may also refer to:

- Ampleforth Abbey, a Benedictine monastery
- Ampleforth College, a coeducational, independent school
- Ampleforth railway station, a former railway station
- St Martin's Ampleforth, an independent preparatory school
- Ampleforth, a character in George Orwell's novel Nineteen Eighty-Four
- Ampleforth, formerly Empire Zephyr, a cargo ship operated by Ampleforth Steamship Co. Ltd.
