= Helmsley railway station =

Disused railway station in North Yorkshire, England

Helmsley
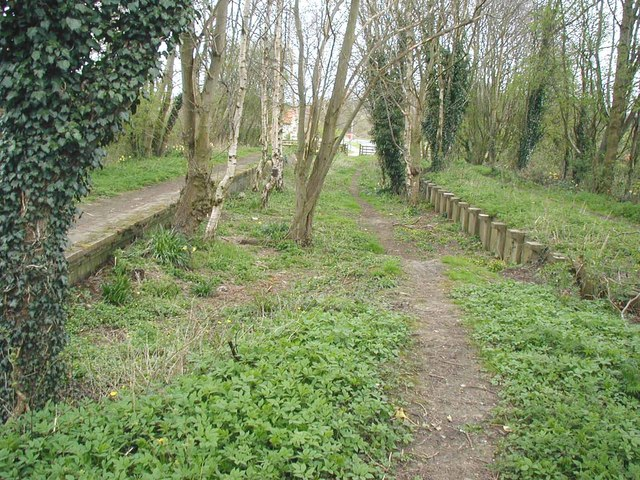
- Helmsley railway station in April 2006

General information
- Location: Helmsley, North Yorkshire; England
- Coordinates: 54.244461°N 1.053900°W
- Grid reference: SE617836
- Platforms: 2

Other information
- Status: Disused

History
- Pre-grouping: North Eastern Railway (UK)

Key dates
- 9 October 1871: Opened
- 2 February 1953: Closed to passengers
- 10 August 1964: Closed to freight
Location

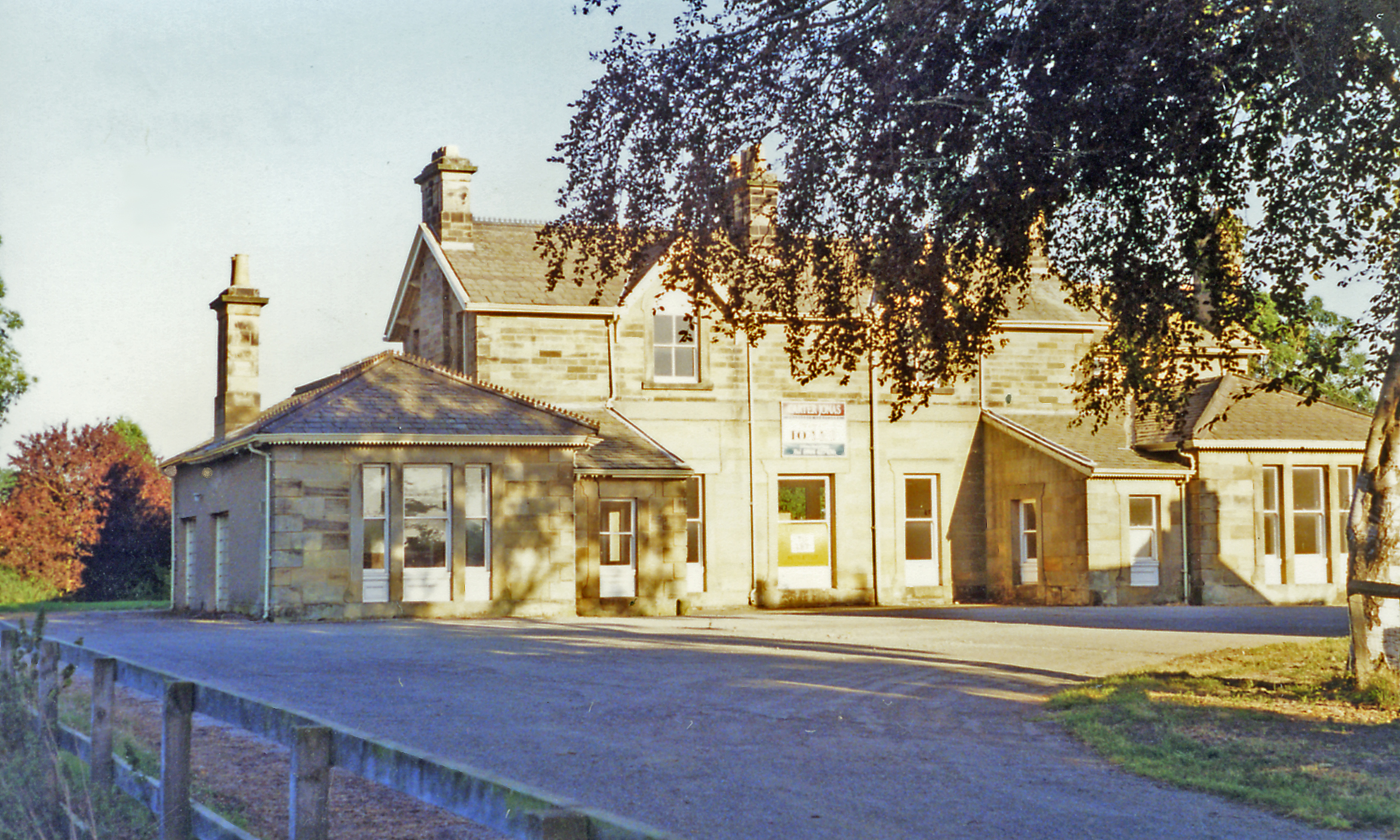
The station buildings in August 1995

Helmsley railway station served the market town of Helmsley in North Yorkshire from 1871 until 1964, although the regular passenger service (and the line from Kirkbymoorside east to Pickering) ceased in 1953. Helmsley station was nearly 15 miles (24 km) from Pilmoor station on the East Coast Main Line, and 12 miles (19 km) from Pickering.

== History ==
The line from Gilling to Helmsley opened on 9 October 1871, although special trains had run in August 1871 to allow people to visit Ryedale agricultural show, which was being held at Helmsley. The official opening of the station was marked by a dinner held at the Black Swan Hotel. The station was 12 miles (19 km) from Pickering in the east, 6 1/2 miles (10.5 km) to Gilling, where the line had a junction with the Thirsk and Malton Line, 14 3/4 miles (23.7 km) to Pilmoor on the East Coast Main Line, and some 32 miles (51 km) to York.

The main station building was located on what would be classed as the down line. It had five waiting rooms, (a 1st and 2nd class waiting room each for Gentlemen and Ladies, and a fifth for everyone else) and its design and style of roof slate deviated slightly from normal North Eastern Railway plans as demanded by Lord Feversham, whose country seat was at Duncombe Park. Lord Feversham owned the whole township of Helsmley, bar three houses, and a clause in the 1865 railway agreement gave Lord Feversham the right "...to be consultd as to the architecture and arrangements of the station."

The extension to Kirby Moorside opened on 1 January 1874. From Helmsley to Pickering, the line ran almost parallel to today's A170 road. Helmsley (and Kirkbymoorsides station), were the only places on the line which possessed a passing loop in the station. Previous to the extension towards Kirbmoorside, Helmsley was the terminus, and had a wooden shed to store the locomotive overnight, which would work the last and first services of the day. On its cessation as a terminus, the shed was demolished.

The station was the busiest on the line for goods traffic; between 1885 and 1914, Helmsley forward more tonnage of goods out than the other four stations on the line put together. A special long siding some 2 1/2 miles (4 km) long, was laid in 1918 to connect Duncombe Park estate with Helmsley goods yard. Between 1918 and 1922, 40,000 tonnes (44,000 tons) of timber was exported through Helmsley Goods Yard.

The goods yard had eight sidings - a coal drop line, a warehouse line, a cattle dock, and stables adjacent to another siding. The Railway Clearing House handbook of stations lists Helmsley as being able to handle a variety of goods traffic including parcels, livestock, furniture vans, horse boxes and horse-drawn carriages.

The station was host to a LNER camping coach from 1935 to 1938 and possibly one for some of 1934.

The station closed on 2 February 1953 but may have been used for excursion trains afterwards until the line closed on 10 August 1964. The station building and signal box survive as private dwellings.

== Services ==
Passenger trains in 1896 numbered five departures towards Pickering, and the same amount southwards to Gilling, usually continuing on to York. By 1906, this was down to four each way all going between York and Pickering, though with an extra evening service between Pickering and Helmsley on a Thursday only. This pattern continued up until 1938, though there was an unadvertised early morning and afternoon service between Helmsley and Pickering for schoolchildren.

During, and straight after, the Second World War, services were reduced to two each way. During the inter-war years, buses had taken some of the passengers away, as the direct route from Helmsley to York was only 20 miles (32 km), as opposed to the 32 miles (51 km) by rail.

Preceding station	Disused railways	Following station
Nunnington; Line and station closed	Gilling and Pickering (G&P) Line; North Eastern Railway	Nawton; Line and station closed
