= Slingsby railway station =

Disused railway station in North Yorkshire, England

Slingsby
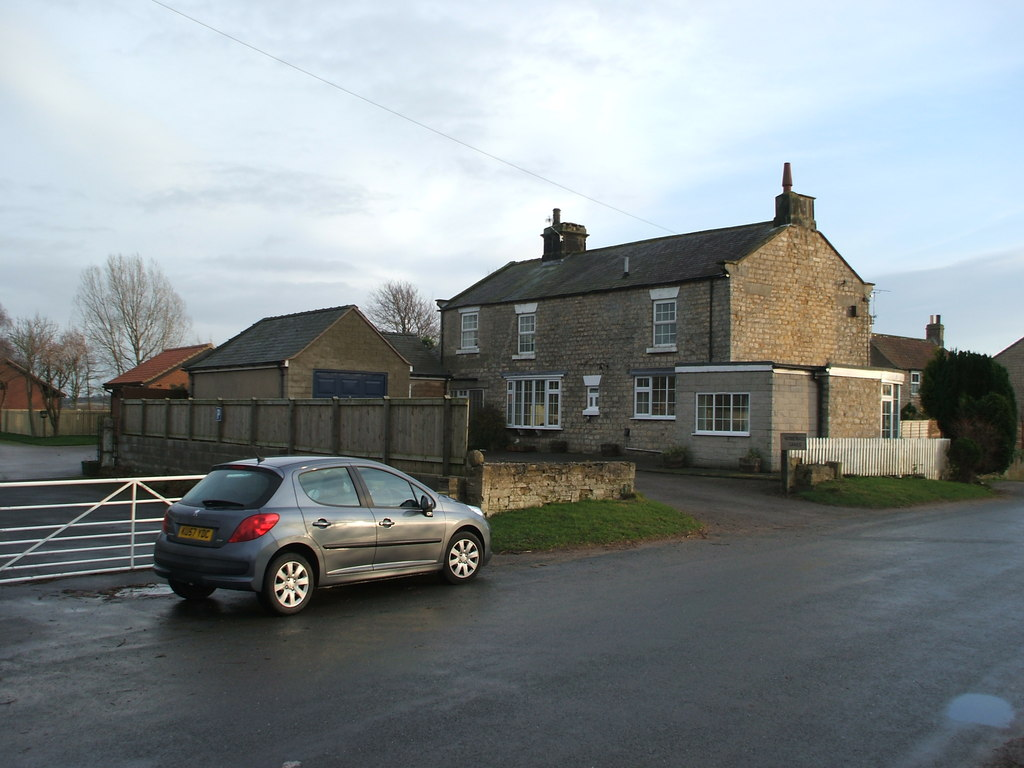
- Site of Slingsby station in February 2008

General information
- Location: Slingsby, North Yorkshire; England
- Coordinates: 54.170000°N 0.931250°W
- Grid reference: SE698754
- Platforms: 1

Other information
- Status: Disused

History
- Original company: York, Newcastle and Berwick Railway
- Pre-grouping: North Eastern Railway
- Post-grouping: London and North Eastern Railway

Key dates
- 19 May 1853: opened
- 1 January 1931: passenger service withdrawn
- 10 August 1964: closed completely
Location

Slingsby railway station is a disused railway station that served the village of Slingsby in North Yorkshire, England. It was built on the orders of the Earl of Carlisle, the local landowner, opened on 19 May 1853 and closed to regular passenger trains on 1 January 1931, but remained open for freight traffic and occasional special passenger trains until 10 August 1964. The station was the only one on the Thirsk and Malton line to be built of stone. It had a single platform that was originally very low, but parts of it were raised to the standard height for NER platforms of 2' 6" after 1865. The goods yard consisted of four sidings, three on the up side and one on the down side of the line. A passing loop on the latter siding that had been taken out of use early in the station's history was reinstated and lengthened in 1943 for unloading ammunition. There were a brick and a timber warehouse, a second brick warehouse was built in 1858 at the request of a corn merchant.

Preceding station	Disused railways	Following station
Hovingham; Line and station closed	North Eastern Railway; Thirsk and Malton Line	Barton le Street; Line and station closed
