= Nunnington railway station =

Disused railway station in North Yorkshire, England

Nunnington
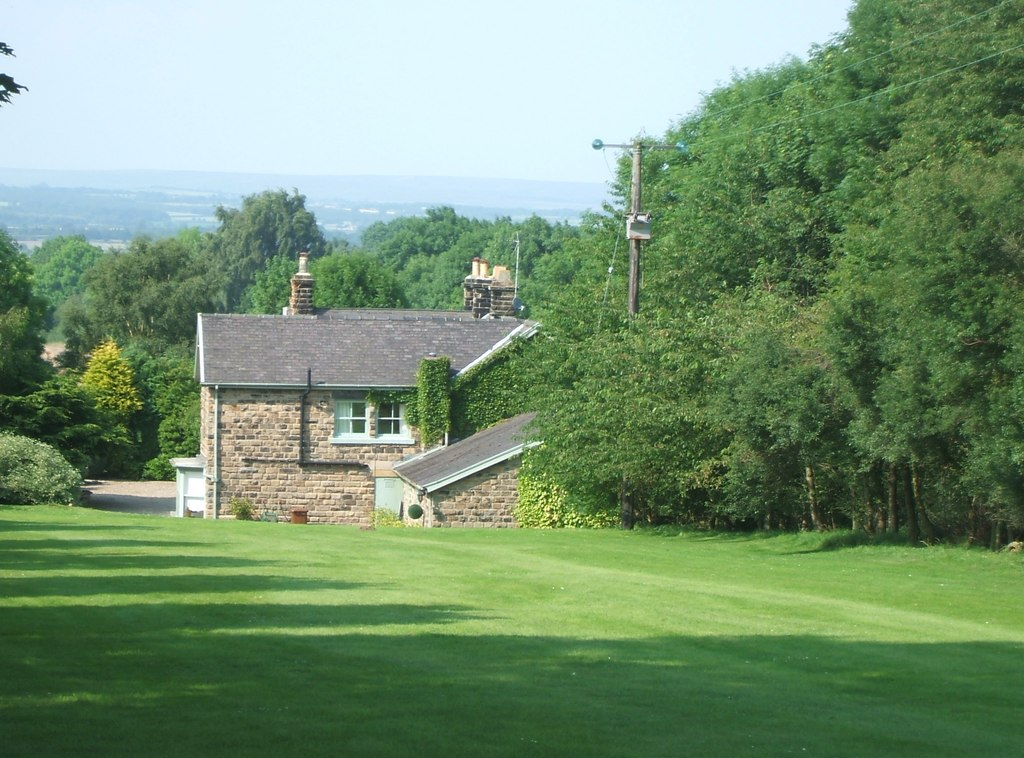
- The site of Nunnington station in July 2009

General information
- Location: Nunnington, North Yorkshire; England
- Coordinates: 54.203000°N 1.005200°W
- Grid reference: SE649790
- Platforms: 1

Other information
- Status: Disused

History
- Pre-grouping: North Eastern Railway (UK)

Key dates
- 9 October 1871: opened
- 2 February 1953: closed regular passenger traffic
Location

Nunnington railway station was located about 1/2 mile (0.8 km) west of Nunnington (and about the same distance east of Oswaldkirk) in North Yorkshire, England.

== History ==
It opened on 9 October 1871, and the regular passenger service ceased on 2 February 1953, although goods traffic and special passenger trains ran until the line closed completely on 10 August 1964.

The station building is now a private house and can still be seen from the Nunnington to Oswaldkirk back road, just before the cutting at Caulkeys Bank.

Preceding station	Disused railways	Following station
Gilling	Gilling and Pickering (G&P) Line	Helmsley
