= Sinnington railway station =

Disused railway station in North Yorkshire, England

Sinnington
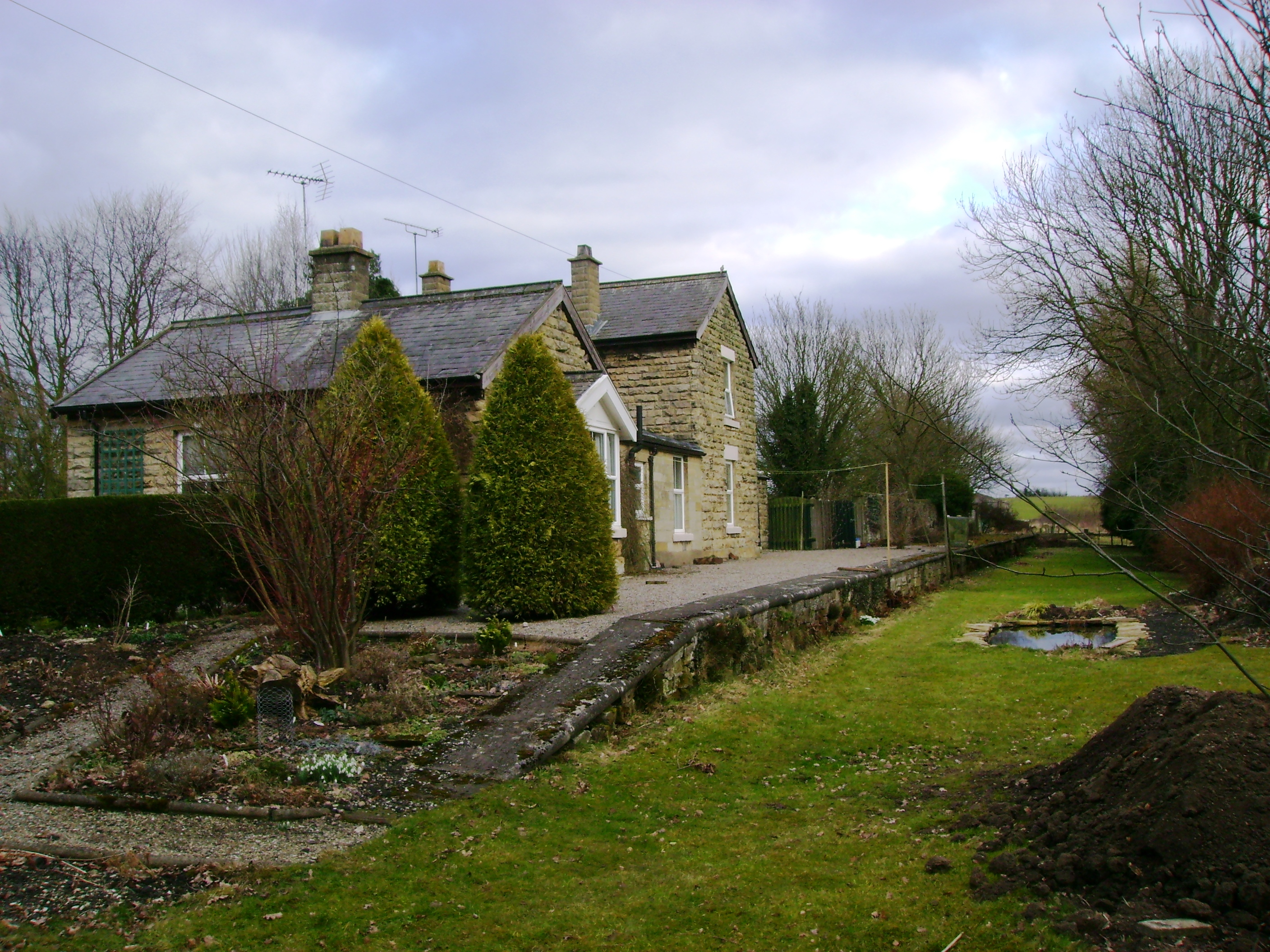
- Sinnington station in March 2009

General information
- Location: Sinnington, North Yorkshire; England
- Coordinates: 54.256000°N 0.857790°W
- Grid reference: SE745850
- Platforms: 1

Other information
- Status: Disused

History
- Original company: North Eastern Railway
- Pre-grouping: North Eastern Railway
- Post-grouping: London and North Eastern Railway

Key dates
- 1 April 1875: opened
- 2 February 1953: closed
Location

Sinnington railway station was a minor station serving the village of Sinnington in North Yorkshire, England on the former Gilling and Pickering (G&P) line. Today's main A170 road follows the old railway line between Helmsley and Pickering.

The station had a small goods yard with three sidings, one serving coal drops, another a loading dock, and the third a cattle dock.

== History ==
Sinnington opened on 1 April 1875 as the last station on the line. After World War I and the emergence of more convenient motor bus services the passenger numbers dropped rapidly, with only about 35 tickets sold per week in the 1930s.

It closed on 31 January 1953 for both passengers and freight, with the end of the York-Pickering service via Gilling and Helmsley, and the track was lifted between Pickering and Kirkbymoorside in the same year. By this time there were only 3 trains each way per day.

The station building has been converted into a private residence, the coal drops into garages. The platform and the weigh office are still in place.

== Public transport to Sinnington today ==
Sinnington is served by East Yorkshire bus no. 128 running between Kirkbymoorside and Pickering, Scarborough and Helmsley running up to hourly during the day, but with no Sunday winter service.

Preceding station	Disused railways	Following station
Kirbymoorside	Gilling and Pickering (G&P) Line	Pickering
