= Holy Epiphany Church, Butterwick =

Church in Butterwick, North Yorkshire, England

Coordinates: 54°11′18″N 0°52′49″W

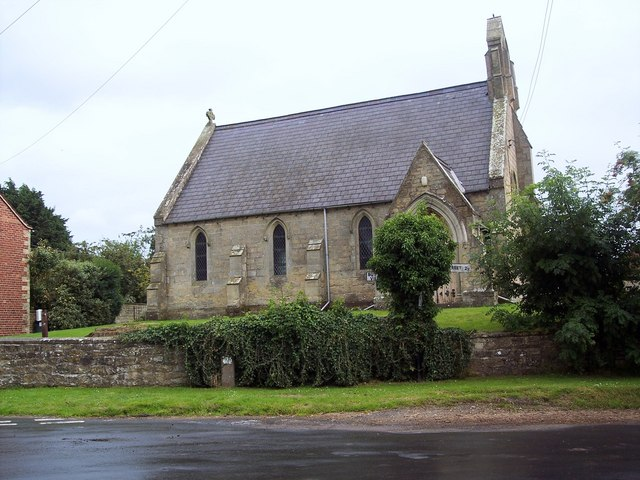
The church, in 2007

Holy Trinity Church is an Anglican church in Butterwick, a village near Malton, North Yorkshire, in England.

The village lay in the parish of St Michael's Church, Barton-le-Street, where the residents of Butterwick funded a lamp. In 1859, a chapel of ease was built in Butterwick, to a design by Tuke and Metcalf. It was altered in about 1890. The church was later moved into the parish of St John of Beverley's Church, Salton.

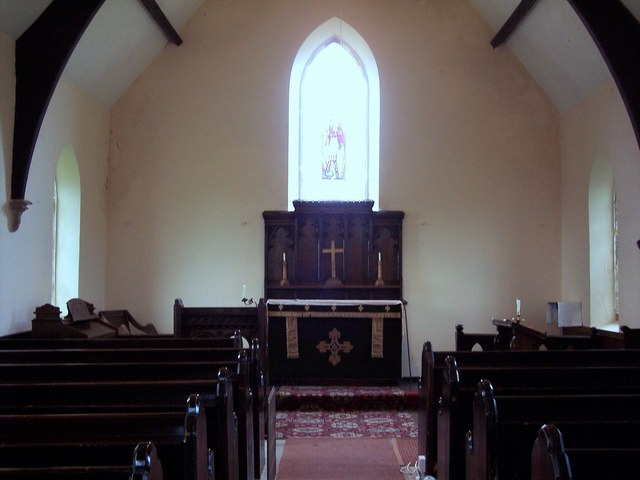
View from the nave into the chancel

The church is built of stone and has lancet windows. It consists of a nave and chancel, with a bellcote and a north porch. Inside, there is a font which was brought from All Saints' Church, Slingsby, and an east window with stained glass installed in 1904.
