= Listed buildings in Barton-le-Street =

Barton-le-Street is a civil parish in the county of North Yorkshire, England. It contains seven listed buildings that are recorded in the National Heritage List for England. Of these, one is listed at Grade I, the highest of the three grades, and the others are at Grade II, the lowest grade. The parish contains the villages of Barton-le-Street and Butterwick, and the surrounding countryside. The listed buildings consist of houses and farmhouses, a church and a cross base in its churchyard, and a milepost.

== Key ==
Grade	Criteria
I	Buildings of exceptional interest, sometimes considered to be internationally important
II	Buildings of national importance and special interest

== Buildings ==
Name and location	Photograph	Date	Notes	Grade
Cross base 54.15893°N 0.89713°W	—	Medieval	The cross base in the churchyard of St Michael's Church is in gritstone. It is about 0.5 metres (1 ft 8 in) high and 0.3 metres (1 ft 0 in) deep, and has a rebate for a shaft.	II
Willow Farmhouse; 54.17936°N 0.88584°W	—	Early 18th century	The house is in limestone, and has coved eaves and a swept pantile roof. The house has two storeys and two bays and a rear outshut, and to the left is a single-storey service wing. In the house the windows are sashes with flat stone arches and keystones, and in the service wing they are casements.	II
Manor Farmhouse; 54.18778°N 0.88209°W	—	Mid 18th century	The farmhouse is in brick, and has a pantile roof with gable coping and shaped kneelers. There are two storeys, three bays, and an outshut and a cross-wing at the rear. On the front is a porch, and the windows are sashes in architraves under relieving arches.	II
The Old Smithy; 54.15809°N 0.89832°W	—	Early 19th century	The house and smithy are in limestone, and have a pantile roof with gable coping and shaped kneelers. There are two storeys, and an irregular plan. They contain doorways, and the windows are horizontally-sliding sashes.	II
Barton House; 54.15948°N 0.89561°W	—	Early 19th century	The house is in limestone and has a pantile roof, hipped on the right. There are two storeys and four bays. The doorway has a divided fanlight, the windows are sashes, and all the openings have flat stone arches.	II
St Michael's Church; 54.15884°N 0.89697°W		1871	The church was rebuilt on the site of an earlier church dating from about 1160, incorporating much sculpture, both original from the earlier church, and contemporary Victorian sculpture. The church is built in Hildenley limestone, the roof is in Westmorland slate, the original sculpture is in Hildenley limestone, and the contemporary sculpture is in Birdsall sandstone. Th church consists of a nave with a south porch, and a chancel with a north vestry, and on the west gable is a double-arched bellcote. Around the church is a corbel table containing about 100 individually carved corbels. The porch is round-arched, and contains three orders of voussoirs, the outer order with various carvings, and the inner orders with chevrons, and the door jambs have carved panels. The windows are round-headed, and at the east and west ends is an oculus.	I
Milepost; 54.15474°N 0.88413°W		Late 19th century	The milepost on the north side of the B1257 road has a triangular plan and a sloping top. On each side is a pointing hand, the left side indicates the distance to Malton and the right side to Helmsley.	II
