= Malton railway station =

Railway station in North Yorkshire, England

Malton
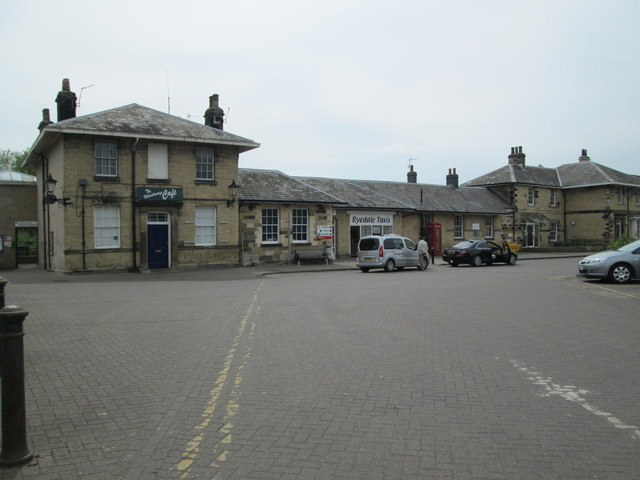
- Malton station in May 2014

General information
- Location: Norton-on-Derwent, North Yorkshire; England
- Coordinates: 54.132°N 0.797°W
- Grid reference: SE787713
- Manager: TransPennine Express
- Platforms: 1

Other information
- Station code: MLT
- Classification: DfT category E

History
- Opened: 5 July 1845; 181 years ago

Passengers
- 2021/22: ▲0.272 million
- 2022/23: ▼0.253 million
- 2023/24: ▲0.293 million
- 2024/25: ▲0.376 million
- 2025/26: ▲0.426 million

Listed Building – Grade II
- Feature: Malton Station
- Designated: 19 March 1986
- Reference no.: 1149543
Location
Notes
- Passenger statistics from the Office of Rail and Road

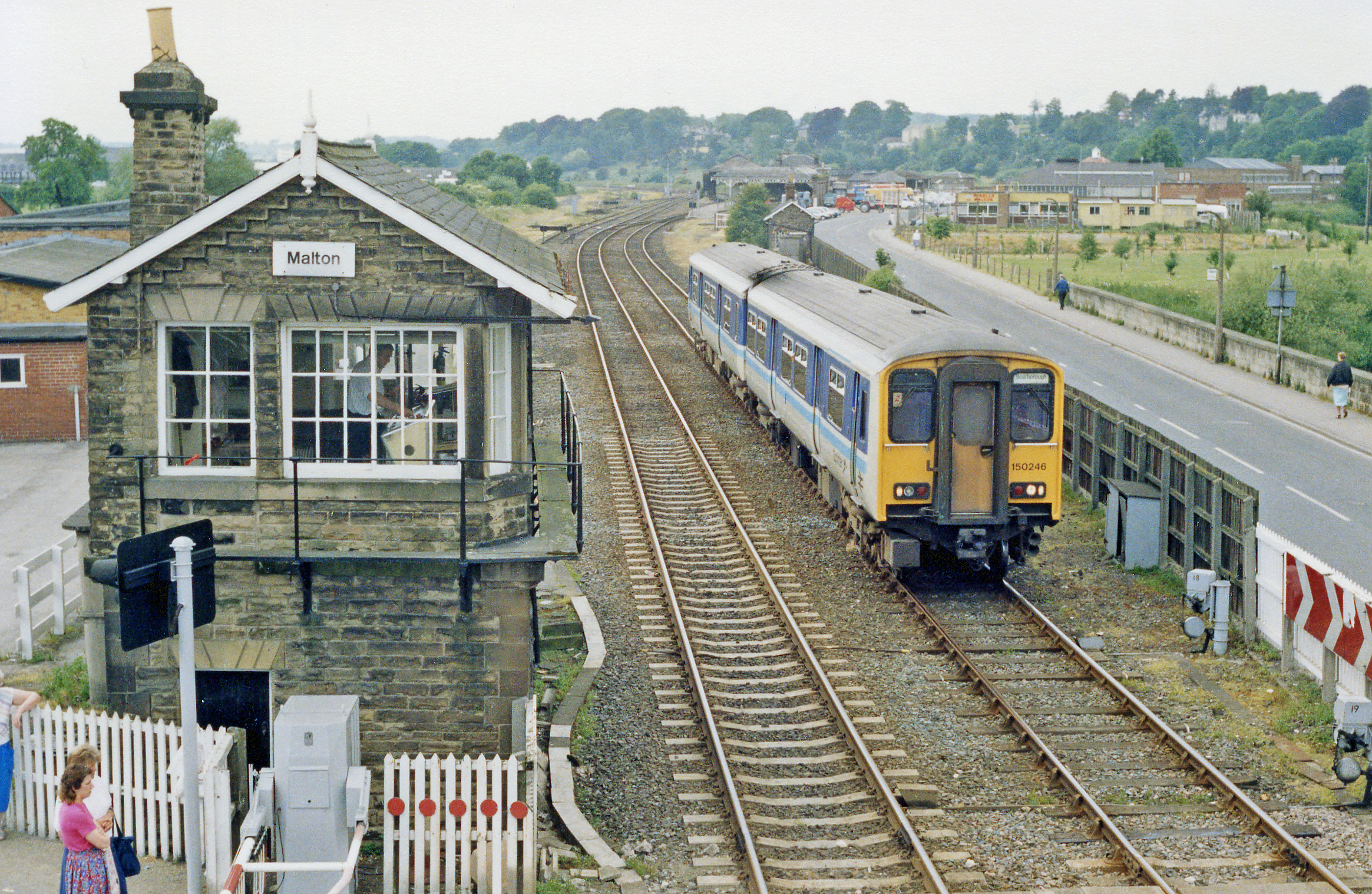
Class 150/2 DMU no. 150246 on 09:42 Liverpool Lime Street to Scarborough express passes Malton signal box in June 1988

Malton railway station is a Grade II listed station which serves the towns of Malton and Norton-on-Derwent in North Yorkshire, England. Situated on the York-Scarborough Line, it is operated by TransPennine Express, who provide all passenger train services. Once an interchange between four lines, Malton station is now only served by trains operating between York and Scarborough. The station itself is south of the River Derwent, and is actually in the town of Norton which used to be in the East Riding of Yorkshire, bordering Malton which was in North Riding. Both towns have been in North Yorkshire since 1974.

== History ==
=== Before the railway came ===
Lying on the River Derwent Malton had been an inland port through which coal had been bought in and agricultural products had been moved for many years. When building started on the York to Scarborough line, building products were bought into Malton and the railway was built east and west from that location.

Malton was served by a number of stagecoaches on the local turnpikes.

Once the railway opened, river traffic declined and in 1855 the North Eastern Railway (NER) bought the Derwent Navigation Company and to further stifle competition they charged high tolls on barge freight.

=== Opening and pre-grouping (1845–1922) ===
The line from York to Scarborough was built by the York and North Midland Railway whose chairman was the railway king George Hudson who had business interests in Scarborough (the "Brighton of the north") and Whitby where he hoped to further develop the harbour. The consulting engineer was Robert Stephenson although for practical purposes John Cass Birkinshaw was the engineer responsible for building the line and his Malton-based engineer was Alfred Lamert Dickens, the younger brother of author Charles.

A new wooden bridge was built over the Derwent and a new street called Railway Street joined the town centre to the new station site. The station buildings, which were opened in 1845, were designed by the architect George Townsend Andrews, and built with stone from the nearby Hildenley Quarry.

Services from Malton station started on 5 July 1845 when the York to Scarborough Line A line from Rillington to Pickering opened on the same date with, initially, horse drawn trains running between Rillington, Pickering and Whitby.

The Malton and Driffield Junction Railway opened on 13 April 1853 and this joined the York to Scarborough line to the east of Malton station at Norton Junction. Although the line passed through Norton no station was provided there. The passenger service was nicknamed the Malton Dodger.

Just over a month later on 19 May 1853 the Thirsk and Malton line was opened with an end on junction, called Scarborough Road Junction, to the Malton and Driffield Railway. Passenger services from Thirsk to Malton would arrive at Scarborough Road Junction and reverse into Malton station.

Yates Foundry was established in the town in 1845 and took advantage of the new railway to grow his business. Yates imported the first combine harvesters from Canada into the UK and they were handled at Malton station goods yard.

The various railway companies that were operating in the north east of England were coming to realise that duplication of many services was leading to small, if any, dividends for their shareholders. This led to the Octuple Agreement for traffic north of York which was signed in 1850. By 1854 an act of parliament was presented in order that the York and North Midland Railway could merge with other north-eastern railway companies into one entity and this led to the formation of the North Eastern Railway who would operate Malton station until 1923.

On 3 May 1870, there was a gas explosion at the station. The platform edging stones were built on a double wall of bricks, separated by a gap, into which gas had leaked. A porter passing with a lamp caused the explosion, which lifted a 50-yard (46 m) length of the flagstones off the platform.

In 1908 the NER employed 80 staff at Malton in the passenger and goods departments. Additionally there were track maintenance staff and staff employed at the engine shed.

=== London & North Eastern Railway (1923–1947) ===
After the First World War the railways were in a difficult situation and the government decided to amalgamate most of the railway companies onto four companies known as the Big 4. On 1 January 1923 Malton station therefore became a London and North Eastern Railway (LNER) station.

Most of the intermediate stations on the York to Scarborough line were closed to passengers on 22 September 1930 as increased bus competition in the area had seen a decline in passenger numbers. The withdrawal of these slow stopping services released capacity on the line allowing more holiday and excursion trains to run to Scarborough and other Yorkshire Coast resorts although the closed stations retained their goods facilities and were maintained for occasional passenger use by excursion trains until the 1960s.

Through passenger services from Thirsk to Malton were also withdrawn in 1930 although excursion traffic to Bridlington (via Driffield) continued to 1958 and Scarborough with a reversal at Malton continuing until 1964.

During the Second World War additional timber traffic and ammunition arrived by rail.

=== British Railways (1948–1994) ===
At nationalisation on 1 January 1948 Malton station became part of the North Eastern Region of British Railways.

The Malton – Driffield route was closed to passenger traffic on 3 June 1950 but remained open for goods. It reopened to passengers from 12 to 16 February 1953 and again in February 1958 when roads were impassable due to snow. The line closed completely on 20 October 1958 and was lifted by 1961 except for a short stretch near Scarborough Road Junction to allow trains to access the Malton to Thirsk line.

After that any excursion traffic from the Thirsk line trains had to reverse at Scarborough Road Junction on the easterly edge of Norton, back down towards Malton station before reversing again and heading off to Scarborough.

The station goods shed burnt down in July 1956.

The through route between Thirsk and Malton was closed on 7 August 1964 although a goods service from Amotherby Mill routed via Scarborough Junction and Malton lasted until October 1964.

Passenger services between Malton, Pickering and Whitby were withdrawn on 8 March 1965, with this line closed entirely north of Pickering in 1965. A freight-only service to Pickering lingered on until 1966.

1966 saw simplification of the infrastructure in the Malton area and two of the local signal boxes were closed. The second platform and overall roof was also removed at this time leaving Malton with a single platform. the roof covering this platform was demolished in 1989 and replaced with a canopy recovered from Whitby railway station. In 1974, a change in county boundaries saw the town of Norton moved into North Yorkshire from the east Riding of Yorkshire. Malton railway station is in Norton, as it is south of the River Derwent, the old boundary between the two counties.

In 1982 British Rail sectorised its operations and services through Malton were operated by Provincial sector (later renamed Regional Railways). This arrangement lasted until privatisation of the UK's railways on 1 April 1994.

The goods yard was closed on 3 September 1984 with some of the last traffic being domestic coal.

=== Privatisation Era (1994–present day) ===
On privatisation responsibility for the infrastructure passed to Railtrack. Operations of the trains continued initially as a train operating unit called Regional Railways North East. The franchise was put out to competition and MTL (transport company) put in the successful tender to run services through Malton. The franchise commenced on 2 March 1997.

The table below details the changes in private operators who have operated the main services through Malton since privatisation..

Passenger service operators (1997–present day)
Operating Name	Owning group	Date from	Date to	remarks
Northern Spirit	MTL (transport company)	2 March 1997	18 February 2000	MTL was purchased by Arriva
Arriva Trains Northern	Arriva	19 February 2000	31 January 2004	ATN branding first appeared in July 2001
First TransPennine Express	First Group/Keolis	1 February 2004	31 March 2016	
TransPennine Express	First Group	1 April 2016	27 May 2023	Renationalised
TransPennine Express	UK government operator of last resort	28 May 2023	Current Operator	

On 10 October 2002 state owned Network Rail took over maintenance of the infrastructure as Railtrack had been declared insolvent.

== Operations ==
=== Passenger ===
When opened in 1845 Malton had two short platforms one on the down (to Scarborough) line and one on the up. A refreshment room was added in 1855.

As the station became busier there was a need to widen the platforms and make them longer. This was done in 1862 by building the down platform out over the down main line. The up main line then became the down main and the up platform was widened and a new up main line was opened.

At the same time passengers for the Whitby line were now changing at Malton rather than Rillington and a separate east facing bay platform was provided for these services as well.

One of Malton station's claims to fame was the novel solution adopted to allow passengers to access the second (island) platform, instead of a footbridge or barrow crossing the NER installed a removable section of platform, in the form of a wheeled trolley running on rails set at right-angles to the (single) running line. When a train had to use the platform, the trolley was wheeled back under the up (York) platform; the trolley was interlocked, with the signals giving access to the platform.

The remodelling of 1966 saw the current layout - the single faced platform bought into service to serve trains in both directions. An up track does exist for non-stop passenger trains and other traffic but all regular passenger trains call at Malton.

=== Historic services ===
Up until 1853 when the Thirsk and Driffield branches opened, there were only three passenger services each way on a weekday which called at all stations.

Nearly thirty years later this had risen to 12 weekday services between York and Scarborough with an even split between local and express (usually fast from York to Malton) services. Two services operated on Sundays.

In 1910 the number had risen to 14 express and three local services on a weekday. Three express and two local services operated on a Sunday. Services had fallen in 1929 to 16 trains – 11 express and 5 locals – with three express and one local service on Sundays. The local service was then withdrawn the following year and in 1939 30 weekday and 11 Sunday services operated.

After World War 2 services declined with just 12 weekday and 3 Sunday services operating in 1960.

Diesel Multiple Units started working York to Scarborough services in the 1960s. The May 1979 timetable saw hourly services in each direction through Malton and these were extended west of York becoming part of the Trans-Pennine network. The early DMUs were life expired and Class 45 locomotives took over passenger operation on the route.

Arriva Trains Northern operated services from Blackpool to Scarborough that stopped at Malton. This service was usually worked by a Metro liveried Class 158, occasionally a Class 155. There was also a local service from York to Scarborough usually worked by a Pacer or a Class 156. When the franchise was relet, services on the line were taken over by First TransPennine Express in February 2004 that operated services from Liverpool to Scarborough.

Before May 2018, trains to Liverpool were routed via the southern Liverpool-Manchester route, serving Manchester Piccadilly instead of Manchester Victoria. In May 2020, Northern Trains was due to commence serving Malton when it introduced a York to Scarborough service. These plans were shelved following the pandemic and no new date has been given for the service to be introduced.

=== Goods ===
Malton had goods facilities on both sides of the line and both west and east of the station. Malton & Norton is a horse racing centre and facilities for loading racehorses were located on the south side of the railway. As well as general goods facilities there were coal drops and cattle pens adjacent to the station building and a two road brick goods shed built in 1857 to replace an earlier smaller structure.

A number of private sidings existed including one for a manure works, sand & timber sidings and an iron foundry. One siding extended across Railway Street bridge (which crosses the River Derwent) and served a biscuit factory. The original wooden bridge built in 1845 was replaced in 1870 by a new wider iron bridge built in 1870.

In 1905 goods traffic handled at Malton consisted of:

- Livestock – 106,884 head
- Coal, coke and lime – 21,206 tons
- Goods inward – 33,324 tons
- Goods outward – 24,110 tons

=== Engine shed ===
Malton had a small engine shed that supplied locomotives to work local passenger and goods trains.

Funding for the shed was agreed in 1853 and at a cost of £435 was built in 1854. The shed was further extended in 1867.

On 1 January 1923 its allocation consisted of 18 locomotives all of which were former North Eastern Railway locomotives. The table below shows the breakdown by type:

Class (NER classification)	Wheel Arrangement	Number allocated	Remarks
W1	4-6-2T	1	LNER loco class A6
G	4-4-0	1	LNER loco class D23
A	2-4-2T	4	LNER loco class F8
O	0-4-4T	2	LNER loco class G5
59	0-6-0	6	LNER loco class J22
1001	0-6-0	1	Was withdrawn during 1923 – surviving example in National Railway Museum, York.
398	0-6-0	2	Class withdrawn by 1928.
B	0-6-2T	1	LNER loco class N8

Under British Railways the shed received the code 50F and in 1959 it had an allocation of 13 locomotives. The shed closed on 15 April 1963.

=== Signalling ===
There were three signal boxes that controlled rail activities at Malton and signalling used semaphore signals and the Absolute Block system.

The three signal boxes (opened in 1873) were called:

- Malton West
- Malton (opposite the station)
- Malton East (near the county river bridge – this controlled the junction for the lines to Driffield and Thirsk)

Malton West and Malton were closed on 22 May 1966 when the area was re-signalled and a new signalling panel was installed in Malton East which was renamed as Malton.

This panel was replaced by a new panel which became operational on 2 July 2020.

Additionally here was also a signal box at Scarborough Junction on the Driffield to Malton line that also controlled access to a bacon factory siding.

Between Malton and Rillington two signal boxes called Houlbeckfield and Espersykes existed, the later which only opened during the summer months when there was heavy holiday traffic on the line. Both are now closed and demolished.

== Facilities ==
The station is staffed, with the ticket office open from start of service until 19:30 each day.

A ticket machine is available. Automated train announcements and passenger information screens provide train running information and there is step-free access to the platform from the station entrance and ticket hall. A cafe and taxi office are also located within the main building.

There are two sidings remaining, opposite the station, which are used by occasional engineering trains and during 2022 Class 68 and Nova 5 sets outstabled from Scarborough.

=== Historic railway remains ===
The former goods yard site is now occupied by modern housing and a doctors' surgery. One former railway building remains on the site called Weighbridge House, although this later became the assistant station master's house.

Most of the old goods yard opposite the station has the tracks removed and is overgrown or has been redeveloped. A short section of the Thirsk and Malton line, adjacent to the Roman site, is walkable and the bridge piers over the River Derwent are still extant.

== Services ==
The typical off-peak service, as of the May 2025 timetable, is:

- 1 train per hour (tph) to York, Leeds and Manchester Victoria
- 1 train per hour (tph) to Scarborough, calling at Seamer.

Following the decision to withdraw the Class 68 units from operation, services are provided by Class 185 DMUs.

Preceding station	National Rail	Following station
York	TransPennine Express North TransPennine	Seamer
	Historical railways	
Huttons Ambo; Station closed; Line open	Y&NMR; York to Scarborough Line	Rillington; Station closed; Line open
	Disused railways	
Terminus	North Eastern Railway; Malton & Driffield Railway	Settrington; Line and station closed
Terminus	North Eastern Railway; Thirsk and Malton Line	Amotherby (via reversal); Line and station closed

== Proposed developments ==
Over the years there have been a number of suggestions that the Malton to Pickering line might re-open either as a branch line or as part of the North York Moors Railway although as of 2023 neither of these has made any progress. Pre Covid an additional Scarborough to York service was proposed but that now appears to have been scrapped.

== See also ==
- Listed buildings in Norton-on-Derwent

== Sources ==
- Bairstow, Martin (1990). Railways in East Yorkshire. Halifax: Bairstow. ISBN 1-871944-03-1.
- Beaumont, Robert (2003). The Railway King. London: Headline. ISBN 0-7472-3236-9.
- Burton, Warwick (1997). The Malton and Driffield Junction Railway. Halifax, [Eng.]: Martin Bairstow. ISBN 1-871944-16-3.
- Cooke, B. W. C., ed. (November 1958a). "The Malton-Driffield Line". Notes and News. The Railway Magazine. Vol. 104, no. 691. London: Tothill Press Limited. pp. 801–2.
- Cooke, B. W. C., ed. (November 1958b). "End of the "Malton Dodger"". Notes and News. The Railway Magazine. Vol. 104, no. 691. London: Tothill Press Limited. p. 802.
- Fawcett, Bill (1995). A History of the York – Scarborough Railway. Cherry Burton, Beverley, East Yorkshire, [Eng.]: The Hutton Press Ltd. ISBN 1-872167-71-3.
- Hoole, Ken (1984). Forgotten Railways: North-East England (2nd ed.). Newton Abbot: David & Charles. ISBN 978-0-946537-10-5.
- Howat, Patrick (2004). Railways of Ryedale. Halifax, [Eng.]: Martin Bairstow. ISBN 1-871944-29-5.
- Mackinder, Margaret; Churches, Christine (2018). Malton and Norton - a 21st century history. Malton, [Eng.]: Malton Museum.
- Mitchell, Vic; Smith, Keith (2012). York-Scarborough. Haslemere, [Eng.]: Middleton Press. ISBN 978-1-908174-23-9.
- Quick, Michael (2022) [2001]. Railway passenger stations in Great Britain: a chronology (PDF). version 5.04. Railway & Canal Historical Society. Archived from the original (PDF) on 25 November 2022.
- Suggitt, Gordon (2005). Lost Railways of North & East Yorkshire. Countryside Books. ISBN 978-1-85306-918-5.
- Tomlinson, W. W. (1967). North Eastern Railway Its Rise and Development. Newton Abbot, [Eng.]: David & Charles (Publishing) Ltd.
- Tomlinson, W. W. (1914). The North Eastern Railway: Its Rise and Development. Newcastle-upon-Tyne: Andrew Reid and Company.
