= Butterwick, Barton-le-Street =

Village in North Yorkshire, England

Coordinates: 54°11′18″N 0°52′46″W

Butterwick
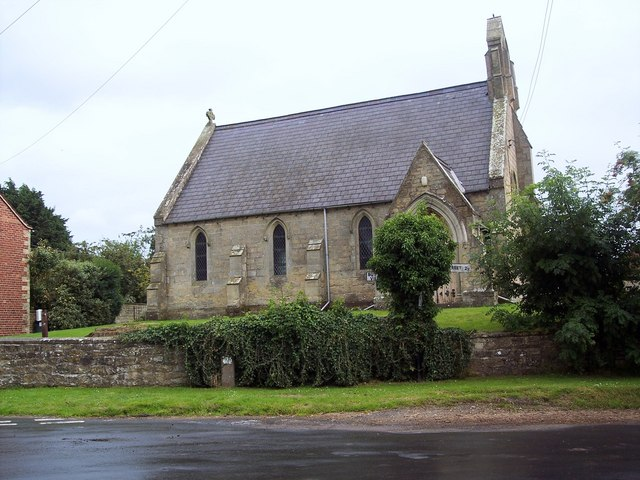

- Location within North Yorkshire
- OS grid reference: SE733775
- Civil parish: Barton-le-Street
- Unitary authority: North Yorkshire
- Ceremonial county: North Yorkshire
- Region: Yorkshire and the Humber
- Country: England
- Sovereign state: United Kingdom
- Post town: MALTON
- Postcode district: YO17
- Police: North Yorkshire
- Fire: North Yorkshire
- Ambulance: Yorkshire

Butterwick is a village in the civil parish of Barton-le-Street, in North Yorkshire, England, about 6 miles from Pickering. In 1961 the parish had a population of 41. Holy Epiphany Church, Butterwick is the village's Anglican chapel.

== History ==
The name "Butterwick" means 'Butter (specialised) farm'. Butterwick was Butruic in the 11th century, Buterwic in the 12th century and Boterwik in the 14th century. Butterwick was formerly a township in the parish of Barton-le-Street, in 1866 Butterwick became a civil parish in its own right.

It was part of the Ryedale district between 1974 and 2023. It is now administered by North Yorkshire Council.

== See also ==
- Listed buildings in Barton-le-Street
