= Amotherby =

Village and civil parish in North Yorkshire, England

Coordinates: 54°09′03″N 0°51′13″W

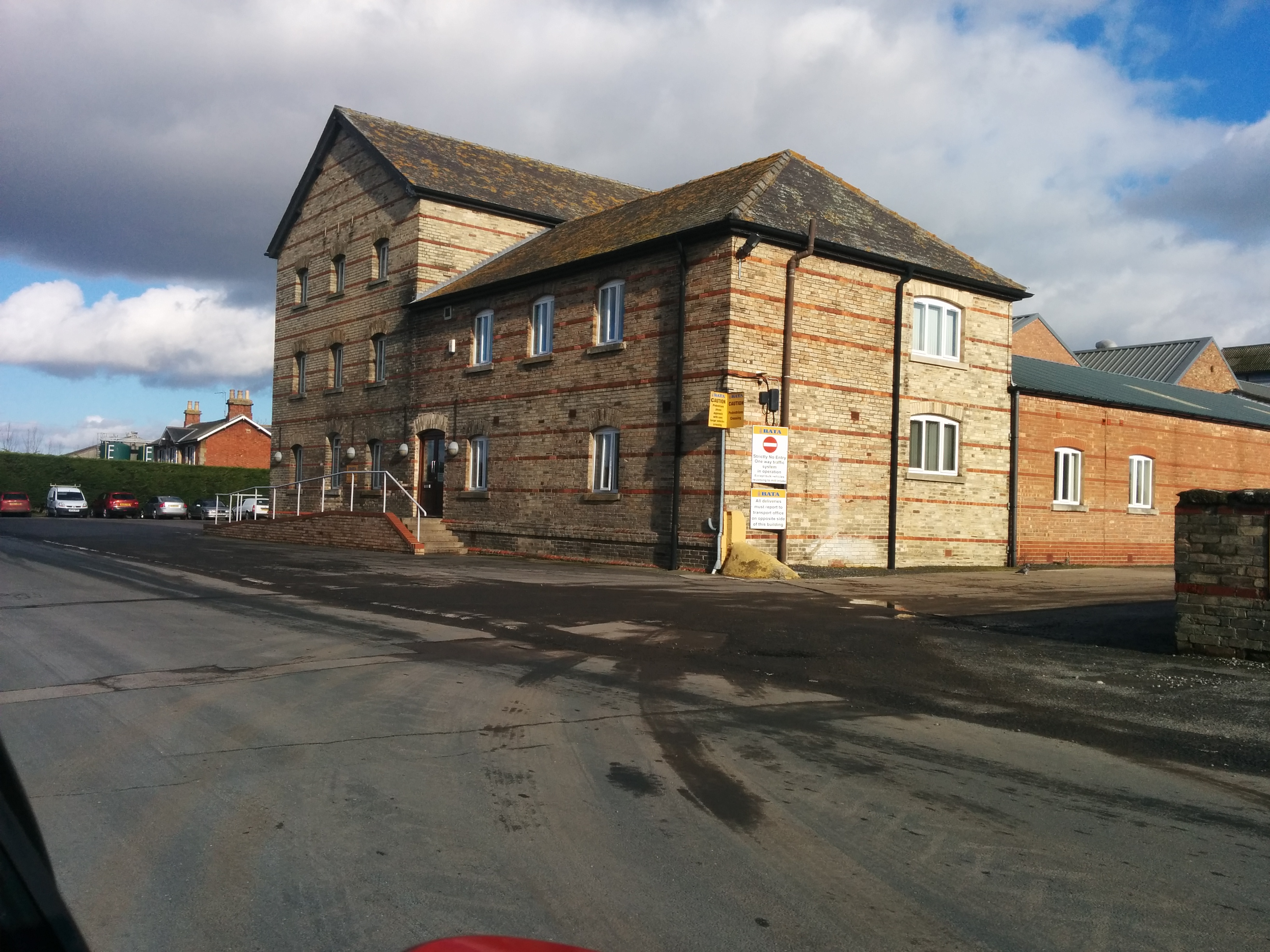
- HQ and mill of the BATA farmers' cooperative group, outside Amotherby. There is also a pub, The Queen's Head.

- Location within North Yorkshire
- Population: 399 (2011 census)
- OS grid reference: SE750735
- Unitary authority: North Yorkshire
- Ceremonial county: North Yorkshire
- Region: Yorkshire and the Humber
- Country: England
- Sovereign state: United Kingdom
- Post town: MALTON
- Postcode district: YO17
- Police: North Yorkshire
- Fire: North Yorkshire
- Ambulance: Yorkshire
- UK Parliament: Thirsk and Malton

Amotherby is a village and civil parish in North Yorkshire, England. It is about 3 miles (4.8 km) west of Malton.

== Description ==
The village appears in the Domesday Book (1086) as 'Aimundrebi' which is derived from 'Eymund's farm'.

The 2001 census recorded a population of 357 for the parish, increasing to 399 at the 2011 Census. St Helen's Church, Amotherby is a Grade II listed building.

Amotherby sits on two main roads, the B1257 between Helmsley and Malton and the Kirkbymoorside to Malton road. Both roads meet at a busy junction in the village, with traffic from Helmsley and Kirkbymoorside meeting towards Malton.

The village used to have a railway station on the Thirsk and Malton line. The station closed to passengers in 1930 but stayed open to goods until 1964.

The village is home to Malton Foods Ltd (formerly known as Westlers) which produces ready meals for the foodservice and retail sectors. The company has been part of Zwanenberg Food Group UK since November 2013.

== Governance ==
An electoral ward in the same name exists. This ward stretches north to Kirby Misperton with a total population taken at the 2011 census of 2,032.

From 1974 to 2023 it was part of the district of Ryedale, it is now administered by the unitary North Yorkshire Council.

== See also ==
- Listed buildings in Amotherby
