= St Helen's Church, Amotherby =

Church in Amotherby, North Yorkshire, England

Coordinates: 54.1512°N 0.8522°W

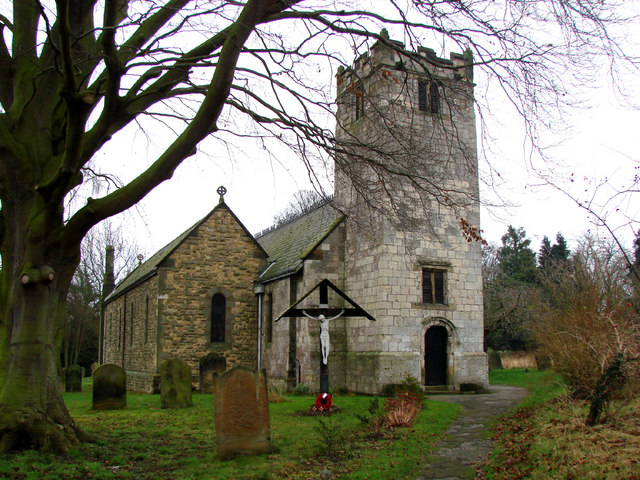
The church, in 2007

St Helen's Church is the parish church of Amotherby, a village in North Yorkshire, in England.

== History ==
A church was built on the site in the 12th century, of which some fragments remain, relocated in the current structure. The tower was rebuilt in the 16th century, and the nave was rebuilt in about 1708. In 1872, George Fowler Jones heavily restored the church, adding a north aisle, vestry and south porch. The church was Grade II listed in 1954.

== Architecture ==
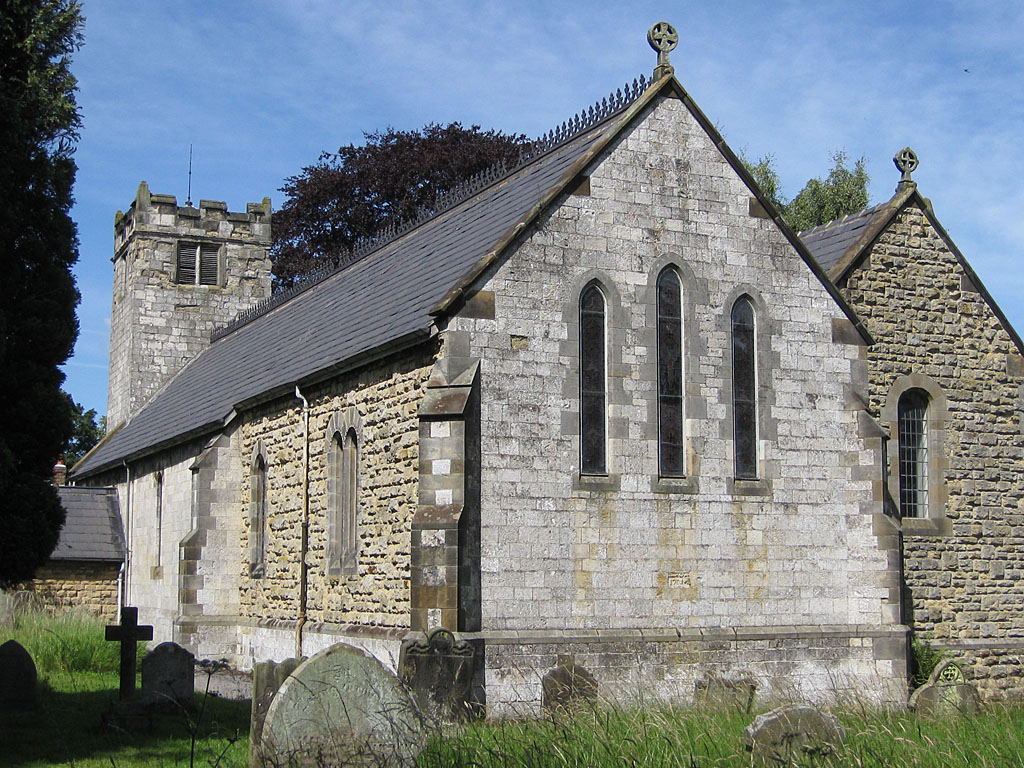
East end of the church

The older fragments of the church are limestone, while the rebuilding is in sandstone, and there is a slate roof. The church consists of a west tower, and a four-bay combined nave and chancel. The tower has a round-arched doorway with a window above, and bell openings on all sides higher up, and it is topped with battlements. The south porch incorporates a 12th-century doorway, moved from its original position, while the door is 19th century and is noted for its wrought iron hinges. The windows to the main body of the church are round-arched, other than three stepped lancet windows at the east end.

Inside the church, there is the tomb slab of William de Bordesdon, who died in about 1340, and an effigy of his uncle, John de Bordesdon. There are some pre-Conquest cross fragments set into the porch. Charles Peach served as vicar for many years until 1886, and he personally designed and carved the pew ends, pulpit and font. There are two stained glass windows in the north aisle, by James Powell and Sons: "The Lord Sitteth Above Water", dating from 1901, and "The Angel of Death", from 1914. There is a window in the south aisle by Gerald Edward Roberts Smith, depicting Christ. The war memorial was designed by Robert Thompson following World War II.

== See also ==
- Listed buildings in Amotherby
