= Nawton railway station =

Disused railway station in North Yorkshire, England

Nawton
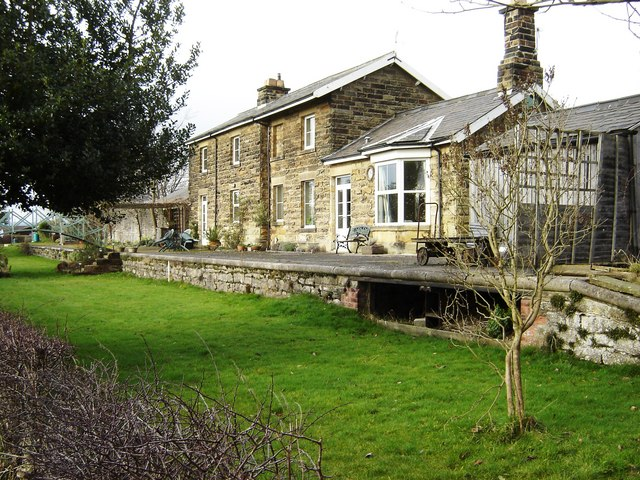
- Station building and platform in February 2009

General information
- Location: Nawton, North Yorkshire; England
- Coordinates: 54.2526°N 0.9907°W
- Grid reference: SE658846
- Platforms: 1

Other information
- Status: Disused

History
- Pre-grouping: North Eastern Railway (UK)

Key dates
- 1 January 1874: opened
- 2 February 1953: closed for regular passenger service
- 10 August 1964: closed completely
Location

Nawton railway station was a minor station serving the village of Nawton, North Yorkshire, England on the former Gilling and Pickering (G&P) line.

== History ==
It opened on 1 January 1874, and closed in 1964. Although the regular passenger service (and the track east from Kirbymoorside to Pickering) ceased in 1953, the station remained open for regular freight services and occasional special passenger trains until 1964.

Following closure, the former buildings served as the local fish and chip shop (in the weigh-bridge office), the blacksmiths shop, and more recently, the post office. Now known as Station House, it is a private residence.

Preceding station	Disused railways	Following station
Helmsley	Gilling and Pickering (G&P) Line	Kirbymoorside
