= Listed buildings in Amotherby =

Amotherby is a civil parish in the county of North Yorkshire, England. It contains seven listed buildings that are recorded in the National Heritage List for England. All the listed buildings are designated at Grade II, the lowest of the three grades, which is applied to "buildings of national importance and special interest". The parish contains the village of Amotherby and the surrounding area, and the listed buildings consist of a church, a boundary stone, a bridge, a former schoolhouse, a farmhouse, a milestone and a former vicarage.

== Buildings ==
Name and location	Photograph	Date	Notes
St Helen's Church; 54.15121°N 0.85214°W		12th century	The church has been much altered and extended through the centuries, including a restoration and alterations in 1871 by G. Fowler Jones. It is built in limestone and sandstone, and has a slate roof. The church consists of a nave, a north aisle, a south porch, a chancel, a north vestry and a west tower. The tower has a single stage, a chamfered plinth, a round-arched west doorway, two-light windows and bell openings above, a moulded eaves course, and an embattled parapet with vestigial pinnacles. The south porch is gabled, and contains a re-set 12th-century doorway with a moulded round arch, shafts with scalloped capitals and a hood mould.
Boundary stone 54.17368°N 0.85608°W	—	Early 18th century	The boundary stone is on the east side of Amotherby Lane. It is a roughly dressed stone with a rounded head, and is about 0.6 metres (2 ft 0 in) high. There are initials on the front and the rear.
Newsham Bridge; 54.17514°N 0.85560°W		Early 18th century	The bridge carries a road over the River Rye. It is in sandstone and consists of three semicircular arches, the middle one taller, and a fourth lower arch. The arches have voussoirs with hood moulds, a raised band, and a raked parapet with chamfered coping. The cutwaters rise to form embrasures in the parapet.
Old Schoolhouse; 54.15126°N 0.85276°W	—	1744	A schoolroom was added in about 1860. The building is in sandstone with a pantile roof. There are two storeys and the original part has two bays. In the earlier part are doorways with segmental arches, and horizontally-sliding sash windows. The doorway in the schoolroom has a Tudor arched head, chamfered jambs and a hood mould, and the windows are mullioned and transomed.
Lime Kiln Farmhouse; 54.14907°N 0.84646°W	—	Late 18th century	The farmhouse is rendered and colourwashed, the main part has a slate roof, and on the rear wing is a pantile roof. There are two storeys, three bays, and a rear wing. The central doorway has a divided fanlight, the windows are sashes, and all the openings have keystones.
Milepost; 54.15360°N 0.85336°W		Late 19th century	The milepost on the east side of Main Street is in cast iron. It has a triangular plan and a sloping upper face, and is about 0.6 metres (2 ft 0 in) high. On each side are pointing hands, on the left side is the distance to Malton, and on the right side the distance to Kirkbymoorside.
The Old Vicarage; 54.15107°N 0.85312°W		1889	The vicarage, later a private house, was designed by Ernest George and Harold Peto. It is in limestone with a tile roof, and is in Jacobethan style. There are two storeys and attics, and a main front of four bays with a gabled porch. The windows are mullioned or mullioned and transomed, and there is a three-light dormer. All the openings have quoined surrounds, and the gables are coped, with kneelers.
