= Kirbymoorside railway station =

Disused railway station in North Yorkshire, England

Kirbymoorside
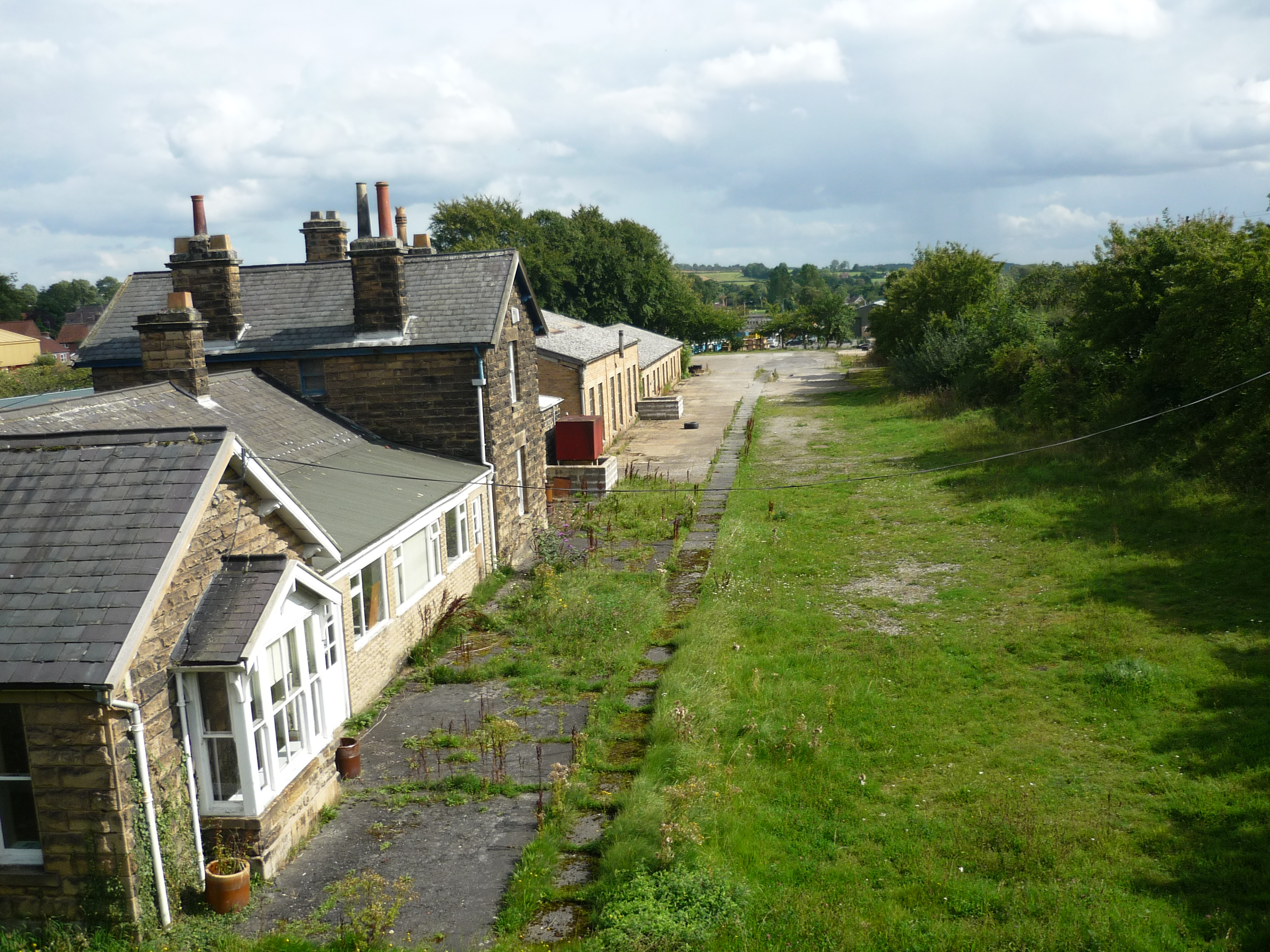
- The station in September 2008

General information
- Location: Kirkbymoorside, North Yorkshire; England
- Coordinates: 54.265670°N 0.929527°W
- Grid reference: SE698860
- Platforms: 2

Other information
- Status: Disused

History
- Original company: North Eastern Railway
- Pre-grouping: North Eastern Railway
- Post-grouping: London and North Eastern Railway

Key dates
- 1 January 1874: Opened as Kirby Moorside
- 31 May 1948: Renamed Kirbymoorside
- 2 February 1953: Closed to regular passenger traffic
- 10 August 1964: closed completely
Location

Kirbymoorside railway station served the market town of Kirkbymoorside in North Yorkshire, England from 1874 until 1964.

== History ==
It was opened on 1 January 1874. The regular passenger service (and the track east to Pickering) ceased on 2 February 1953 but freight traffic and occasional special passenger trains continued until 10 August 1964.

The station was host to a LNER camping coach from 1935 to 1939 and possibly one for some of 1934.

After closure the railway station building was used for industrial purposes, but was demolished between April/May 2010 in favour of a new housing development.

Preceding station	Disused railways	Following station
Nawton	Gilling and Pickering (G&P) Line	Sinnington
