= Hovingham railway station =

Disused railway station in North Yorkshire, England

Hovingham Spa
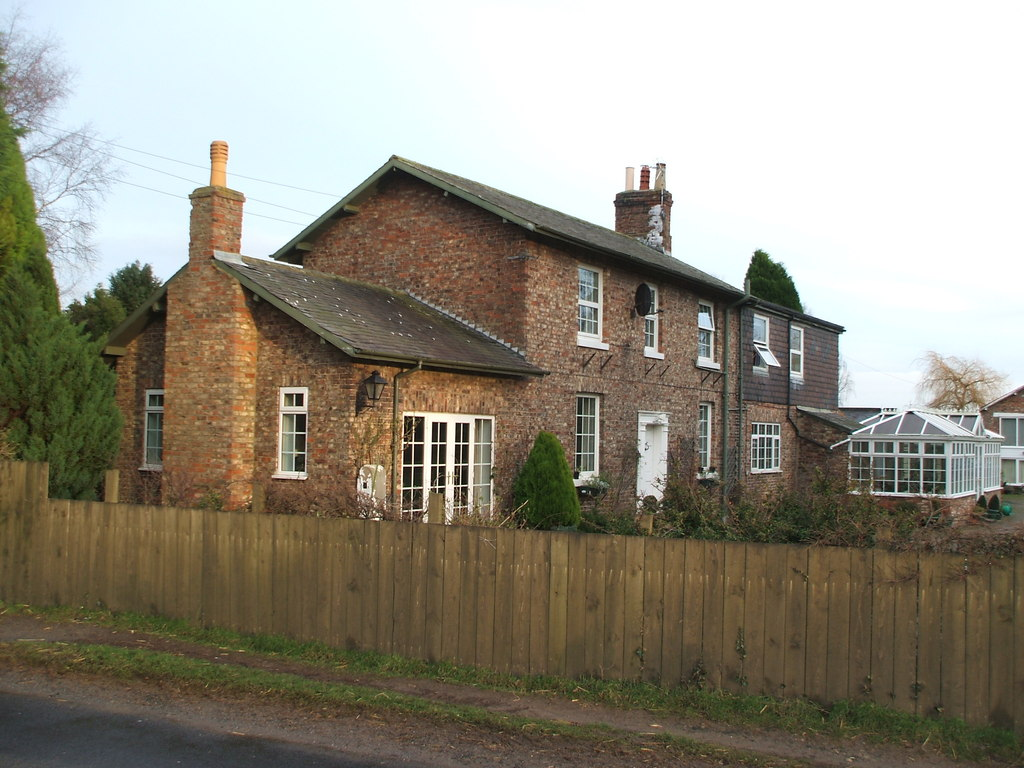
- The former station in February 2008

General information
- Location: Hovingham, North Yorkshire; England
- Coordinates: 54.176220°N 0.973664°W
- Grid reference: SE670760
- Platforms: 1

Other information
- Status: Disused

History
- Original company: York, Newcastle and Berwick Railway
- Pre-grouping: North Eastern Railway
- Post-grouping: London and North Eastern Railway

Key dates
- 19 May 1853: Opened as Hovingham
- 1 October 1896: Renamed; Hovingham Spa
- 1 January 1931: Regular passenger service ceased
- 10 August 1964: closed completely
Location

Hovingham Spa railway station was located just north of the village of Hovingham in North Yorkshire, England and opened on 19 May 1853. Regular passenger service ceased on 1 January 1931 but freight traffic and occasional special passenger trains continued until complete closure on 10 August 1964. It was part of the Thirsk and Malton (T&M) rail route, which paralleled today's B1257 road from Hovingham to Malton.

The station had a single platform on the up side of the line, which was originally very low, but which was in 1865 partially raised to the NER standard height of 2 feet 6 inches (760 mm). The station offices were incorporated in the stationmaster's house, a two-storey brick building. The goods yard, mainly on the up side of the line, had up to six sidings which served the coal drops, two warehouses, a cattle dock, and another loading dock, and handled timber traffic. In the 1950s goods traffic increased due to limestone from nearby Wath quarry being in demand from the steel industry. The goods yard was extended in 1948 with a new loading dock. The limestone traffic practically ceased by 1960 when the stone was not needed any more for lining the steel furnaces.

Preceding station	Disused railways	Following station
Gilling; Line and station closed	North Eastern Railway; Thirsk and Malton Line	Slingsby; Line and station closed
