= Gilling and Pickering line =

Former railway line in Yorkshire, England

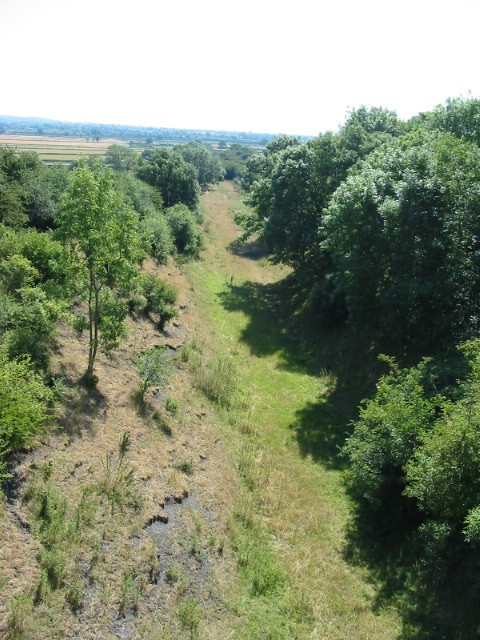
- Looking south eastwards across Riseborough Cutting in July 2006

Overview
- Status: Closed
- Locale: North Yorkshire
- Termini: Gilling station (Parliamentary Junction) Thirsk and Malton line; Pickering station York and North Midland Railway
- Stations: 5

Service
- Type: Heavy rail
- Operator(s): North Eastern Railway; London North Eastern Railway; British Rail

History
- Opened: 9 October 1871 – 1 April 1875 (in stages)
- Closed: 10 August 1964 (completely)

Technical
- Line length: 18 mi 48.7 chains (29.95 km)
- Number of tracks: 1
- Track gauge: 4 ft 8 1/2 in (1,435 mm)
- Operating speed: 20 mph (32 km/h) Bishophouse Junction – Gilling; 30 mph (48 km/h); Gilling – Pickering

The Gilling and Pickering line (G&P) was a railway line that ran from Gilling to Pickering in North Yorkshire, England.

The line was opened in stages between 1871 and 1875 and linked up with the Thirsk and Malton line (T&M) at Gilling and the York and North Midland Railway at Pickering. The line connected the settlements of Helmsley, Kirkbymoorside, Nawton, Nunnington and Sinnington to others parts of the North Eastern Railway (NER) network. Closure to passengers came on 2 February 1953, with complete closure to all traffic on 10 August 1964.

== History 1864–1913 ==
North Eastern Railway (Gilling and Pickering Branch) Act 1866
- Act of Parliament
- Parliament of the United Kingdom
- Long title: An Act to enable the North-eastern Railway Company to construct a Railway from Gilling to Helmsley and Pickering; and for other Purposes.
- Citation: 29 & 30 Vict. c. x

Dates
- Royal assent: 18 May 1866

The North Eastern Railway first submitted plans for a line through Ryedale to Helmsley in 1864. These were rejected and with other companies trying to push railways through the area (Ryedale Railway Company and the Leeds, North Yorkshire and Durham Railway (LNYDR) being notable competitors) the NER felt compelled to act. The NER and the Ryedale companies submitted plans for their respective railways but both efforts were defeated in Parliament. Eventually the Ryedale and the NER reached an agreement whereby the NER would build their line to Pickering via Helmsley and the Ryedale would be compensated to the amount of £11,000 for the expenses it had occurred. The Gilling and Pickering line was approved by the North Eastern Railway (Gilling and Pickering Branch) Act 1866 (29 & 30 Vict. c. x).

The Ryedale plan involved a line from Gilling northwards through Helmsley to Stokesley and Thornaby with a triangular junction at Harome where the eastern arm would go through Kirkbymoorside (Note: The town of Kirkbymoorside is spelt as shown. The railway station had varying degrees of other spellings (Kirby-moorside being one) but they mostly omitted the second 'K'. When referring to the NER/LNER/BR railway station on the G&P line, the spelling has been left as Kirbymoorside.) and bypass Pickering on a direct route to Scarborough. Additionally, it proposed a branch going north from Kirkbymoorside and pushing into Farndale. Both the northern arms of the Ryedale Railway proposals involved tunneling and a substantial number of overbridges (the Farndale branch alone was proposed to cross the River Dove 73 times in ten miles). In the end, the NER stuck by its own plan of 1864 with two minor adjustments, there would be no north to east curve at Cawton (where the T&M and the G&P met at Parliamentary Junction) and so no through running from Hovingham and the original intention was that the line would enter Pickering from the north to allow through running to Scarborough on what was to become the Forge Valley Line.

The first section of line to be completed was in October 1871, when a south to east curve (Bishophouse to Sunbeck) from the main line at Raskelf was installed to allow trains to run through to York. This had been submitted as a raft of proposals to Parliament in 1865 as the North-eastern Railway Company's (Pelaw and other Branches) Act 1865 (28 & 29 Vict. c. cxi). It gained royal assent on 19 June 1865. Thereafter the line was built in stages; Gilling to Helmsley in 1871 (opening on the same date as the new curve at Raskelf), Helmsley to Kirbymoorside in 1874 and Kirbymoorside to Pickering in 1875. The eastern end of the line entered Pickering from the south and connected with the York and North Midland Line from Rillington and the Forge Valley Line at a junction called Mill Lane.

The line left Gilling station in an easterly direction for 2 miles (3.2 km) before diverging from the T&M route and going due north to Nunnington and then north westerly to Helmsley. At Helmsley the line curved almost 180 degrees to go east across the southern edge of the North Yorkshire Moors and calling at Nawton, Kirkbymoorside and Sinnington.

The line was single throughout with passing loops in Helmsley and Kirbymoorside stations. There was a small section of double track (0.25 miles (0.40 km) as the line converged with the other railways at Mill Lane Junction in Pickering. The line had three major earthworks; Riseborough Cutting, Caulkeys Bank Cutting and Kirkdale Viaduct. The engineering for this line was far heavier than the T&M line.

== History 1914–1964 ==
Services on the G&P line went through to York via the east to south curve onto the East Coast Main Line near to Raskelf. These services became the backbone of both the G&P and the T&M lines when the passenger service on the T&M line was cut back to serve just between Malton and Gilling in 1914. After this date, services leaving and arriving at Gilling from the T&M line would dovetail with those on the G&P service to and from York. Because of the nature of the lines leaving Gilling to the east and the near dead-on departure times for both lines being the same, races between trains going east were not uncommon, despite not being officially sanctioned by the company.

Timetabled passenger workings on the T&M line were stopped altogether in January 1931, which left the G&P service operating alone from Pickering to York. However, one service a day at this time ran through to Pilmoor and there was an additional unadvertised afternoon working for schoolchildren. During the Second World War, passenger traffic was sparse, with just two out-and-back workings from Pickering. One of these went all the way to York, and the other terminated at Alne with onward connections to York. By October 1950, the timetable had three through workings between York and Pickering, but not all services stopped at all of the stations on the East Coast Main Line. All stations on the line between Bishophouse Junction and Mill Lane junction continued to be called at by trains, with the exception of Ampleforth, which closed in 1950.

All of the stations on the line were closed to passengers on 2 February 1953, however, because there was no Sunday service on the line, the last trains ran on the previous Saturday (31 January 1953). Most of the stations stayed open for goods services. Excursions, ramblers specials and summer seaside trips were commonplace after closure to passengers, with the last official passenger working being a special worked in conjunction with the opening of the BMEWS base at RAF Fylingdales in November 1963. The section between Kirbymoorside and Pickering was closed to all traffic in the same month as the passenger service, although a small section at Pickering was retained as a headshunt for a gas works on the western side of the line. Tracklifting was carried out between Kirbymoorside and Pickering soon after closure and this left Kirbymoorside as a terminus until all the Ryedale lines were closed completely in 1964.

== Working the line ==
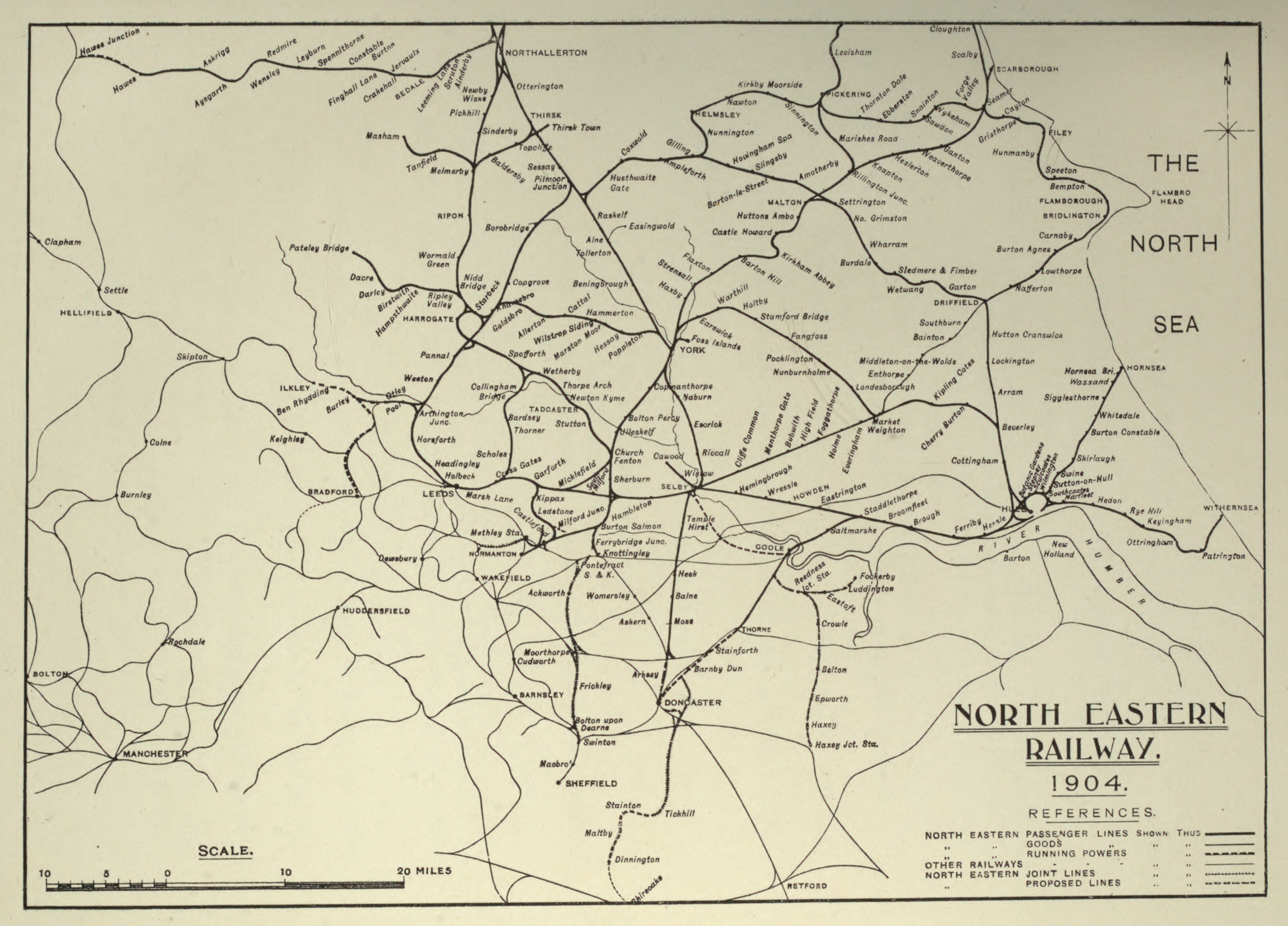
North Eastern Railway map (south)

In its initial stages of opening, the station at Helmsley had an engine shed which would haul the first and last services of the day to and from that station. Likewise, when the line opened up to Kirbymoorside, the locomotive would travel to there to start the first morning train. When the railway opened up all the way to Pickering, the NER removed the shed and traction was supplied from Pickering or York.

Helmsley and Kirbymoorside stations were the only ones to have passing loops with two platforms (although Nawton did possess a non-platformed loop which was described as an 'open siding'). The loops would only be used if trains needed to pass each other; if there was no requirement for trains to pass, then the westernmost track at Helmsley and the northernmost track at Kirkbymoorside (which were adjacent to the main station buildings at both stations) would be used instead regardless of the direction that the train was travelling in.

Signal boxes were located at (west to east); Gilling, Helmsley, Kirbymoorside and Goslip Bridge (Pickering). Signalling on the line was a mixture of electronic token, staff and ticket and the one engine in steam principle. Gradually, all of the line was converted to electronic token particularly after one incident at Kirbymoorside when a train arrived from Helmsley going east with a staff for the Helmsley to Gilling section. Electric token working was introduced across the line in stages between 1924 and 1933.

All of the stations on the line had cattle docks and coal drops. The line was chiefly used for the forwarding of agricultural produce and cattle to the markets outside of Ryedale.

In 1896, services on the line amounted to five in each direction with an additional down service (towards Pickering) on Thursdays. Sundays were left with no passenger workings. By 1906 the services on this line had been reduced to four each way with an additional Thursdays only working from Pickering. In 1934, three years after the passenger service on the T&M line had ceased, the services were back up to being five daily out and back runs between Pickering and York. In the war years, the service was reduced to two daily through trains that would be simple out and back workings, with crews changing over trains in the Coxwold station loop.

== Stations ==
Five stations were constructed along the line and the table below lists the locations of each station. Gilling was constructed as part of the T&M line and Pickering as part of the Y & NMR.

Name	Coordinates	Notes
Nunnington	54°12′10.9″N 1°00′19.3″W	Post of Station Master at Nunnington dispensed with in 1926. Thereafter it came under the responsibility of Helmsley.
Helmsley	54°14′38.7″N 1°03′09.2″W	Timber was the main traffic from here. A standard gauge line left just before the station to go to Duncombe Park; additionally another narrow gauge line was used to transport timber. The station was furnished with five waiting rooms at the behest of the Feversham family (owners of the Duncombe Park Estate); one each for Ladies and gentleman of First Class, one each for ladies and gentleman of Second Class and one final room for others
Nawton	54°15′09.3″N 0°59′26.6″W	Possessed a passing loop which was severed at the Kirbymoorside end of the station to provide a long siding.
Kirbymoorside	54°15′56.5″N 0°55′48.4″W	Was the busiest station on the line in terms of passenger numbers – a peak of 29,000 passengers in 1909.
Sinnington	54°15′23.1″N 0°51′28.4″W	Passenger numbers were low at this station particularly towards the end of the line's life. Buses went right into the village whereas the station was south of the village and the A170 road.

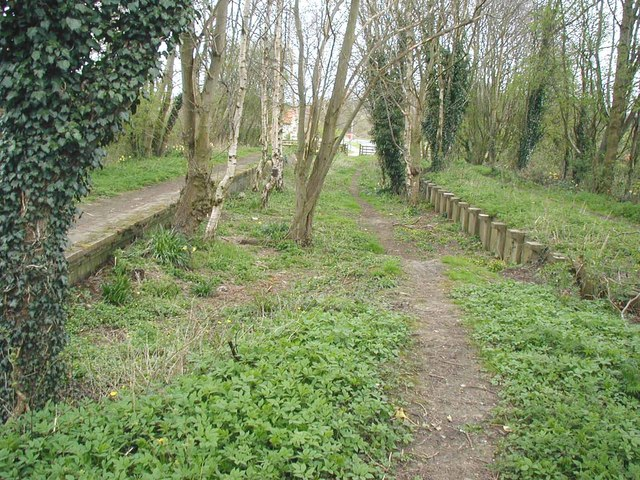
The site of Helmsley railway station in April 2006, looking eastwards

== Goods traffic ==
Two main sidings to goods terminals existed on the line; Duncombe Park just west of Helmsley and Spaunton Quarry just west of Sinnington. Timber was the commodity from Duncombe Park as it had extensive woodlands and during 1918 in particular, there was a timber shortage. A 3-mile (4.8 km) siding was laid which went westwards from Helmsley station (which also had exchange sidings in the station yard). The siding fell into disuse in the 1930s. Timber was an important traffic on other stations on the line too; Nunnington, Kirbymoorside and Sinnington were kept busy with sending timber out by rail.

Spaunton Quarry was started in 1928 and a 1930 agreement with the LNER provided a siding into Sinnington station facing eastwards. The siding was worked by the Pickering bound goods which would halt at Sinnington and reverse into the siding. The track was not maintained to a good standard and after a number of derailments, the siding was not used from February 1948.

The line had a small siding at Harome between Nunnington and Helmsley which was installed in 1880. Originally the local population campaigned for a station, but it was never built. The siding was of a short length (41 yards (37 m)) which could fit five standard length wagons and was just one line with a junction facing towards Gilling. Whenever traffic was to be forwarded, the farmers in the area would need to contact Helmsley to allow the pick-up goods train to call at the siding.

The open moorland above Helmsley was ideal for the training of tank crews with the added benefit that Helmsley station had an end loading dock. Tank trains were generally weekly, though this would sometimes be as much as thrice weekly. Loading and unloading was performed at night, with soldiers standing on either side of the flat wagons onto which the tanks were being driven; they would smoke cigarettes so that the light given off would guide the tank drivers.

Nawton station was particularly busy for such a small station. It forwarded fruit to many destinations and was used to store sugar and was a trans-shipment point for the storage of barley at the former airfield at RAF Wombleton just south of the station. When RAF Wombleton airfield was being constructed, trains of slag would be run specially (from Teesside) into Nunnington station for onward transport to the airfield site. Thirteen trains ran between 7 June and 21 July 1943 with the LNER providing a shunting locomotive at Nunnington station. The slag was loaded onto lorries using the coal drops.

Cattle was forwarded in great numbers from both Helmsley and Kirbymoorside stations, with sheep being of importance at Kirbymoorside. The last special train of sheep ran from Kirbymoorside in 1952.

== Accidents and incidents ==
- On 26 November 1875, a train derailed travelling from Gilling to Nunnington.
- In February 1948, the trackwork at Spaunton Quarry collapsed under a locomotive which left all wheels of the engine touching the ground.

== Lastingham and Rosedale Light Railway ==
At various times after the Light Railways Act 1896 (59 & 60 Vict. c. 48) came into being, proposals were put forward by the Lastingham and Rosedale Light Railway Company to build a line northwards from the G&P Line. The track was supposed to leave just west of Sinnington with a west to north facing junction, proceed 8 miles (13 km) up the valley to Lastingham and Rosedale with the eventual intent of connecting with the Rosedale Ironstone Railway. The Lastingham and Rosedale Light Railway Order 1900 was granted, and work did start in 1902, but it soon ground to a halt. An extension of time was granted by the Lastingham and Rosedale Light Railway (Extension of Time) Order 1903, but the railway was never completed.

== Post closure ==
Removal of the lines started in March 1965 and was complete by August of the same year. Whilst many of the former buildings have been converted (especially into private dwellings) the former station building at Kirbymoorside was used by an agricultural engineering firm for many years. The building was demolished in April 2010 to make way for a new housing estate.

Ryedale District Council have suggested that the section of trackbed between Helmsley and Kirkbymoorside could be used as a cycle path/greenway. The section just east of Kirkbymoorside adjacent to Kirkby Mills was used when the A170 road was re-sited to the south of the town between 1962 and 1964, to avoid the twisting section through the village of Keldholme.
