= St Michael's Church, Barton-le-Street =

Church in Barton-le-Street, North Yorkshire, England

Coordinates: 54°09′32″N 0°53′49″W

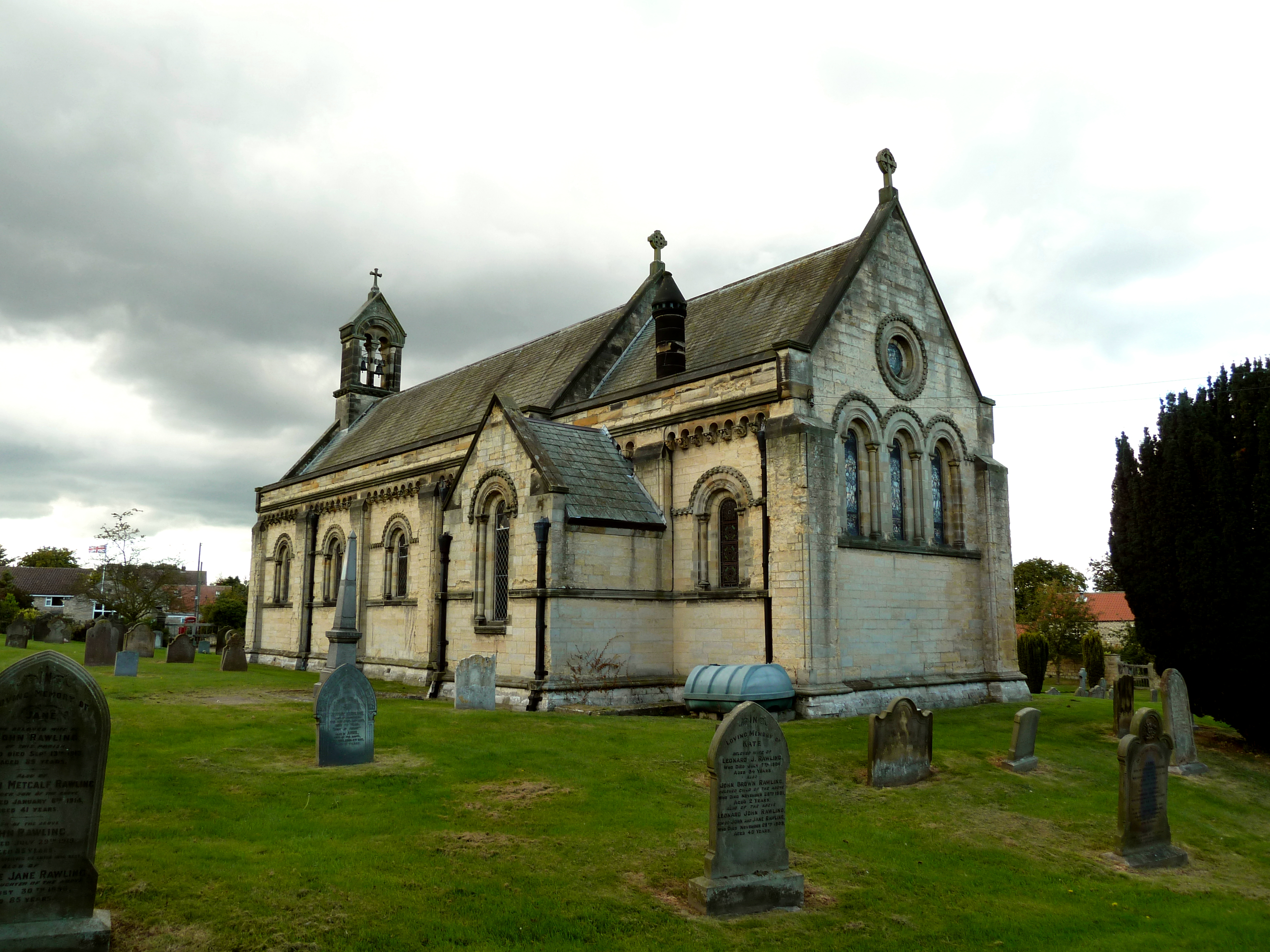
The church, in 2016

St Michael's Church is the parish church of Barton-le-Street, a village in North Yorkshire, in England.

A church in Barton-le-Street was mentioned in the Domesday Book. A successor was built in Barton-le-Street in or around the 1160s, which the Victoria County History states "seems to have been a remarkably rich example... the sculptured stones preserved in the present building being of a very unusual character". In 1871, the church was completely rebuilt, in the Norman style, to designs by Perkin and Son. The current church occupies the same footprint as the medieval one, and incorporates almost all the sculpture from that structure. Historic England state that "this sculpture is without close known parallels in England", instead being similar to examples in Western France, such as the Church of Notre-Dame la Grande, Poitiers. It has been Grade I listed since 1954.

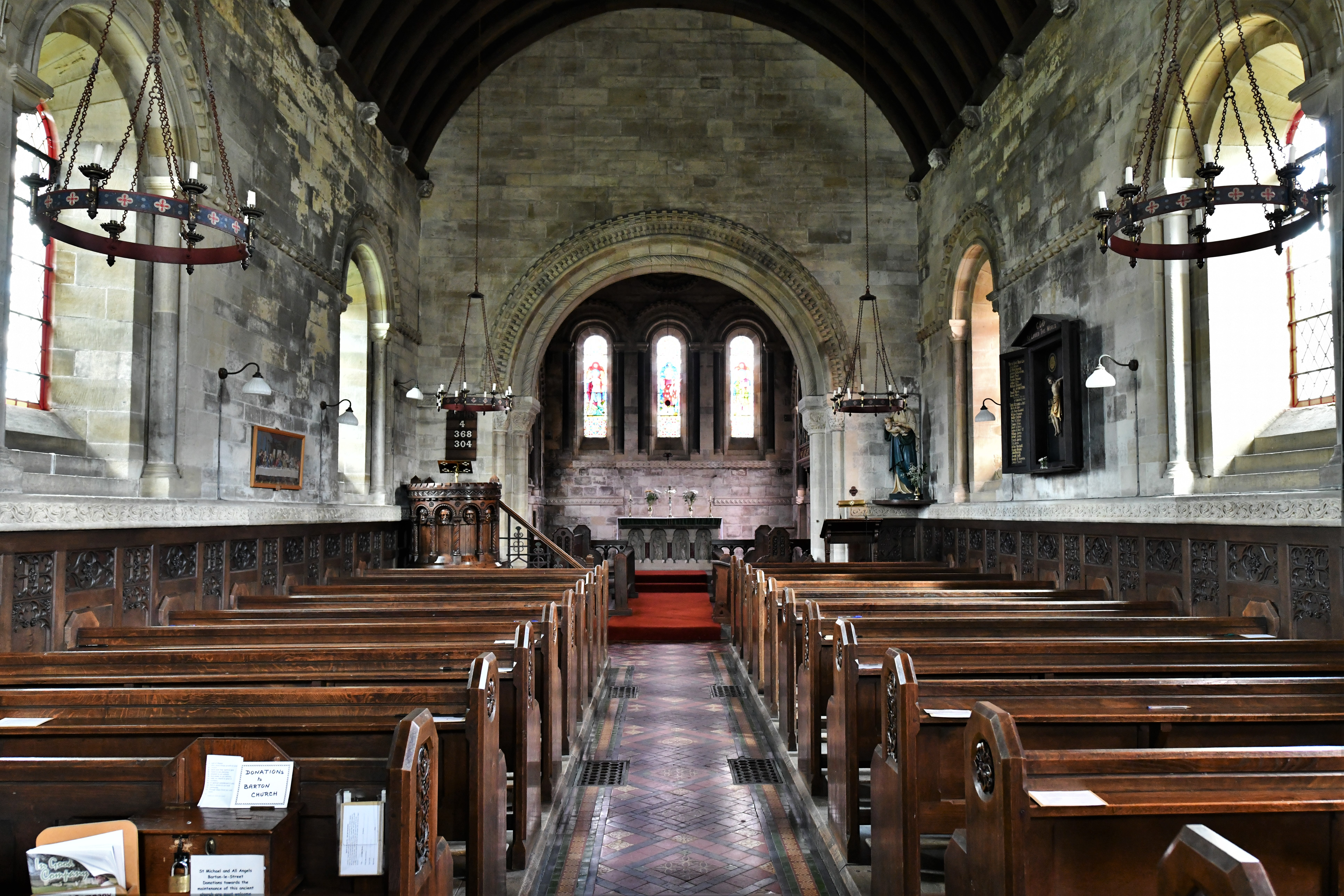
View from the nave into the chancel

The church is built of limestone, with a slate roof. It consists of a four-bay nave and a two-bay chancel, with a combined vestry and organ chamber to the south. There is a north porch, and a bellcote at the west end. The windows are round-headed, and the walls are supported by buttresses. The capitals of the buttresses are connected by corbel tables with about 100 carvings in the 12th century style, made for the Victorian rebuilding, by Charles Mawer. The north doorway is believed to have been the south door of the medieval church, and it is surrounded by a mixture of 12th century and Victorian carvings. Inside, most of the carving is medieval, with scenes including the Adoration of the Magi and the Labours of the Months, much showing Anglo-Scandinavian influence.

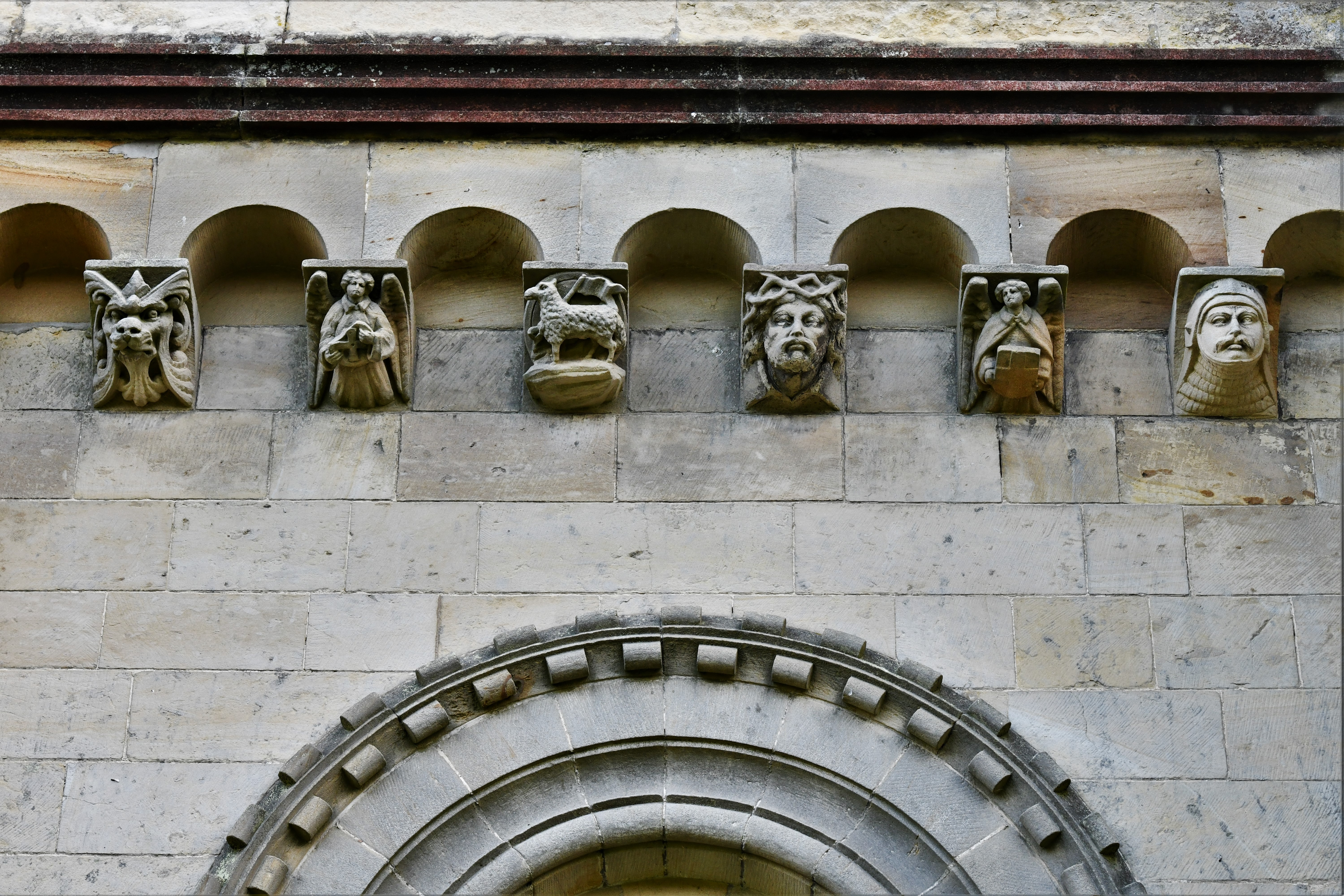
Victorian carvings on the external corbel table

Inside the church is a medieval piscina on a Norman base. The altar rails and pulpit are wooden and neo-Gothic, designed by William Matthews. There is a stone and alabaster font in similar style, and Gothic wall panelling, along with a later Gothic organ case, designed by Temple Moore. The floor tiles were designed by William Godwin. The stained glass windows are in a mixture of styles, that in the north and south of the chancel is by Barnett & Son, while the east windows are by Heaton, Butler and Bayne. In the nave, there is a triptych which serves as a World War I memorial.

== See also ==
- Grade I listed buildings in North Yorkshire (district)
- Listed buildings in Barton-le-Street
