= Gilling railway station =

Disused railway station in North Yorkshire, England

Gilling
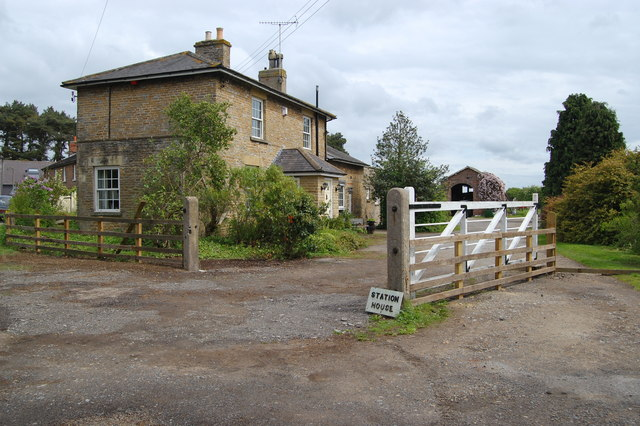
- Former station building in May 2009

General information
- Location: Gilling East, North Yorkshire; England
- Coordinates: 54.187400°N 1.058927°W
- Grid reference: SE615772
- Platforms: 2

Other information
- Status: Disused

History
- Original company: York, Newcastle and Berwick Railway
- Pre-grouping: North Eastern Railway
- Post-grouping: London and North Eastern Railway

Key dates
- 19 May 1853: opened
- 2 February 1953: closed for regular passenger service
- 27 July 1964: closed completely
Location

Gilling railway station is a disused railway station in North Yorkshire, England that served the village of Gilling East. East of it, the Gilling and Pickering line branched off the Thirsk and Malton line.

== History ==
The station opened in 1853. On 26 November 1875 a horse box and cattle truck in the last train from Thirsk to Malton derailed and were overturned. Three sheep were killed and passengers in the other carriages were seriously shaken.

Regular passenger services to Malton closed in 1930, between Thirsk and Pickering on 2 February 1953, but freight traffic and occasional special passenger trains continued to use the station until 27 July 1964.

== Ampleforth College Tramway ==
Gilling was the station for passengers wishing to go to Ampleforth College, a Roman Catholic independent school near Ampleforth, and special trains would be run at the start and the end of term time. The college was equidistant between Ampleforth and Gilling Stations, but access was easier from Gilling.

On 3 August 1895 the college signed an agreement with the NER to build a tramway from Gilling station. Construction of the 3 feet (0.91 m) gauge Decauville track tramway started in 1894 (a year before the agreement was signed) and it was opened by Christmas 1895 to connect Gilling with the College and its gasworks. The tramway was built by Mr. White at a cost of £1,072 8s 7d (equivalent to £120,000 in 2025).

Open wagons were supplied to transport staff and pupils to the college from the station, but they were secondary to the main traffic which was coal for the gas boilers. Six tip wagons were provided by Alexander Penney and Sons, Engineers of London.

The line was horse-drawn throughout its history (though at least one diesel/petrol locomotive was used). For a time a winch was used using the steam engine in the mortar mill to haul wagons from the cricket pitch up hill to the building site where the monastery was being constructed.

It was closed sometime after 1923 when the college changed over to electric lighting. The exact date is not recorded but the agreement with the NER was terminated on 25 April 1929.

| Preceding station | Disused railways | Following station |
|---|---|---|
| Ampleforth; Line and station closed | North Eastern Railway; Gilling and Pickering Line | Nunnington; Line and station closed |
| Ampleforth; Line and station closed | North Eastern Railway; Thirsk and Malton Line | Hovingham; Line and station closed |
