= Alne, North Yorkshire =

Village and civil parish in North Yorkshire, England

Coordinates: 54°04′59″N 1°14′30″W

Alne
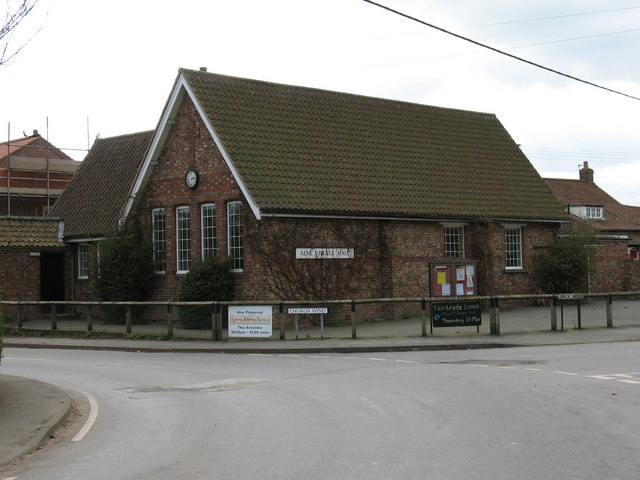
- The village hall

- Location within North Yorkshire
- Population: 756 (2011 census)
- OS grid reference: SE495654
- Unitary authority: North Yorkshire
- Ceremonial county: North Yorkshire
- Region: Yorkshire and the Humber
- Country: England
- Sovereign state: United Kingdom
- Post town: Easingwold
- Postcode district: YO61
- Police: North Yorkshire
- Fire: North Yorkshire
- Ambulance: Yorkshire
- UK Parliament: Thirsk and Malton (UK Parliament constituency)

Alne is a village and civil parish in the county of North Yorkshire, England, about twelve miles north-west of York and four miles from Easingwold. The parish has a population of 711 (2001 census), increasing to 756 at the 2011 census.

== Etymology ==
The village is named in the Domesday Book as part of the ancient wapentake of Bulford and owned by the church of St Peter, York. The name may be derived from the Latin word Alnus for Alder, as the village was surrounded by these trees. The name could also be derived from a river-name of the Alaunā type, derived from Brittonic al-, "bright, shining" (Welsh alaw, "waterlily"). This may have been an alternative name for the River Kyle. In the 12th century, the wapentake was renamed as the wapentake of Bulmer.

== History ==
The parish used to include the nearby settlements of Tholthorpe, Aldwark, Flawith, Youlton and Tollerton, covering nearly 10,000 acres.

To the north-east of the village, Alne Station opened in 1841, but this was closed to passengers in 1958. In the Middle Ages, Alne Hall was the country residence of the treasurers of St Peter's, York.

== Governance ==
The village is within the Thirsk & Malton parliamentary constituency. From 1974 to 2023 it was part of the Hambleton District, it is now administered by the unitary North Yorkshire Council. The civil parish is made up of four councillors.

== Geography ==
The village lies 2 miles (3.2 km) west of the A19 road and immediately north of the River Kyle. The village used to have a railway station on the East Coast Main Line that runs less than a mile to the east of the village.

The soil contains some alluvium as well as sand and loam. The land to the east of the village is a good source of brick clay, and supports the York Handmade Brick Company who have supplied specialist bricks to The Shard and London Bridge railway station.

== Village amenities ==
In the village there is Alne Cricket Club who play in the Nidderdale and District Amateur Cricket League. The local Tennis Club play in local leagues at the local Recreational Playing Fields. There is also a public house, the Blue Bell Inn, which was one of three inns in the village in the 1820s. The village is home to two Nursing and Care homes, Oak Trees and Leonard Cheshire.

The village also hosts an annual street fayre, which has been mentioned in The Times top 20 days out, that raises funds for the maintenance and improvement of the Alne recreation and sports park.

== Demography ==
The 2001 census showed that the population of the parish was 711 in 249 households. Of those dwellings, 159 are detached and 215 owner occupied. Of the total population, 497 are aged 16 or over of which 316 were in employment.

In the 2011 census, the population was 756 in 272 dwellings.

== Education ==
The village has one school, Alne County Primary School, for pupils aged 4 to 11. Pupils receive their secondary education at Easingwold School.

== Religion ==
St Mary's Church, Alne, is a Grade I listed building that has been extensively rebuilt from its original Norman structure. There used to be a Methodist Chapel as well built in 1848.

== See also ==
- Listed buildings in Alne, North Yorkshire
