= Youlton =

Village and civil parish in North Yorkshire, England

Coordinates: 54.06422°N 1.25283°W

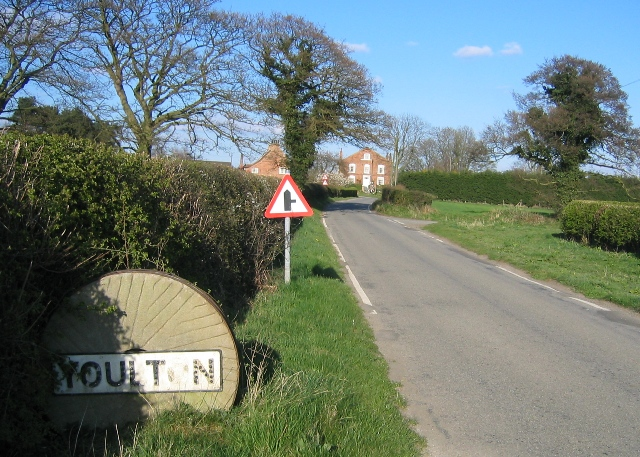
- Entering the village of Youlton from the south west

- Location within North Yorkshire
- OS grid reference: SE490634
- Unitary authority: North Yorkshire
- Ceremonial county: North Yorkshire
- Region: Yorkshire and the Humber
- Country: England
- Sovereign state: United Kingdom
- Post town: York
- Postcode district: YO61
- Police: North Yorkshire
- Fire: North Yorkshire
- Ambulance: Yorkshire
- UK Parliament: Thirsk and Malton

Youlton is a village and civil parish in the county of North Yorkshire, England. It is situated approximately 5 miles (8 km) south-west of Easingwold and 11 miles (18 km) from York. The population of the civil parish at the 2011 census was fewer than 100. Details are included in the civil parish of Aldwark.

== History ==
The name Youlton derives from the Old Norse personal name Joli, and the Old English tūn meaning 'settlement'.

The rights to the manor in the village used to belong to University College, Oxford. Amongst the previous landowners were the de Ros family. Youlton Hall was used by King James I as an overnight stop between London and Edinburgh.

== Governance ==
The village is within the Thirsk and Malton parliamentary constituency.

From 1974 to 2023 it was part of the Hambleton District, it is now administered by the unitary North Yorkshire Council.

== Geography ==
The village lies midway between the River Ure and the River Kyle. Local roads link the village with Alne, North Yorkshire, to the north and Great Ouseburn to the west.

== See also ==
- Listed buildings in Youlton
