= Tholthorpe =

Village and civil parish in North Yorkshire, England

Coordinates: 54°05′45″N 1°16′38″W

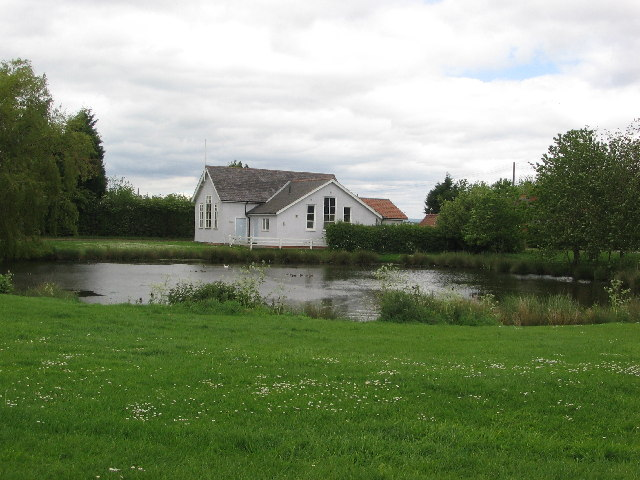
- Tholthorpe Village Hall on The Green

- Location within North Yorkshire
- Population: 282 (2011 census)
- OS grid reference: SE473668
  - London: 180 mi (290 km) SSE
- Unitary authority: North Yorkshire
- Ceremonial county: North Yorkshire
- Region: Yorkshire and the Humber
- Country: England
- Sovereign state: United Kingdom
- Post town: Easingwold
- Postcode district: YO61
- Dialling code: 01347
- Police: North Yorkshire
- Fire: North Yorkshire
- Ambulance: Yorkshire
- UK Parliament: Thirsk and Malton (UK Parliament constituency)

Tholthorpe is a village and civil parish in the county of North Yorkshire, England. It is situated approximately 4 miles (6 km) south-west of Easingwold and 12 miles (19 km) north-west of York.

== History ==
The village is mentioned in the Domesday Book as "Turulfestorp" and later as "Thoraldsthorp" and was probably a Viking settlement. The meaning of the name is Norse in origin for the hamlet of Thorald.

To the west of the village is Ten Mile Hill, where human remains have been found, probably linked to the battle at nearby Myton in 1319.

The remains of a Second World War air force station, RAF Tholthorpe is located nearby. The main units that were stationed there were from No. 6 Group RCAF, including No 77 Sqn; No 420 Sqn; No 425 Sqn No 431 Sqn and No 434 Sqn.

== Governance ==
The village lies within the Wetherby and Easingwold constituency. From 1974 to 2023 it was part of the Hambleton District, it is now administered by the unitary North Yorkshire Council.

== Demography ==
According to the 2001 UK Census, the village has a population of 269 in 88 households. Of the total population, 190 are over 16 years of age, of which 139 are economically active. Of the 88 households, 76 are owner occupied and 67 are detached dwellings.

== Geography ==
The village is north-east of the River Ure covering about 1,700 acres. Derrings Beck flows to the north side of the village and joins Carle Beck to form the River Kyle. The local roads link the village with Raskelf and Helperby to the north, Myton-on-Swale to the west and Flawith and Tollerton to the south east. The East Coast Main Line railway lies 1.5 miles (2.4 km) to the east, though the nearest stations are either York or Thirsk.

The soil varies in different locations around the village. On the west, it is fertile agricultural soil, whilst to the east it is clay and to the north is a mixture of sand and clay.

== Village amenities ==
The village has one public house, the New Inn. There is an industrial park on Moor Lane and a business park on Hag Lane. There is a village hall situated on The Green next to the pond. The village is served by one bus route between Easingwold and York.

== Religion ==
There is a small Wesleyan chapel in the village built in 1844 and restored in 1894.
