= Harry Rowe =

Harry Rowe is the name of:

- Harry Rowe (footballer) (1925–2014), Australian rules footballer
- Harry Rowe (showman) (1726–1799), English showman and puppeteer

== See also ==
- Harry Rowe Shelley (1858–1947), American composer, organist and professor of music
- Henry Rowe (disambiguation)
