= Henry Rowe =

Henry Rowe may refer to:

- Henry Rowe (lord mayor) (died 1612), English merchant
- Henry S. Rowe (1851–1914), American businessman and politician
- Henry Rowe (architect) (1812–1870), Irish architect
- Henry Rowe (lawyer) (1916–1992), Austrian-born British lawyer and parliamentary draftsman
- Henry W. Rowe (1840–1913), U.S. Army private and Medal of Honor recipient

== See also ==
- Harry Rowe (disambiguation)
