= Listed buildings in Tollerton, North Yorkshire =

Tollerton is a civil parish in the county of North Yorkshire, England. It contains six listed buildings that are recorded in the National Heritage List for England. All the listed buildings are designated at Grade II, the lowest of the three grades, which is applied to "buildings of national importance and special interest". The parish contains the village of Tollerton and the surrounding countryside. Four of the listed buildings are houses and cottage in the village, and the others are milestones on the A19 road.

== Buildings ==
Name and location	Photograph	Date	Notes
Gill House; 54.07191°N 1.21834°W		1690	The house, which has been altered, is in pale red-brown brick, with a stepped floor band, stepped and cogged eaves, and a tile roof, hipped on the right, and with a raised verge and a brick kneeler on the left. There are two storeys and an L-shaped plan, with a front range of five bays, and a rear cross-wing with two bays. The doorway on the second bay is approached by steps, and has a fanlight and a hood, the fourth bay has a blocked window, and the other windows are 19th-century sashes. Inside, there is a large inglenook fireplace.
Alne Cottages; 54.07221°N 1.21989°W	—	Mid-18th century	A house and an attached cottage in red-brown brick, with a floor band, dentilled eaves, and a swept pantile roof. There are two storeys, the house has two bays, the cottage has one, and the gable end faces the street. The house on the right has a doorway with a modillion hood, the cottage has a modern door, and the windows are sashes. The gable end has two bays, an eaves band and horizontally sliding sash windows.
Green View; 54.07138°N 1.21912°W	—	Mid to late 18th century	The house is in red-brown brick, with a stepped floor band, dentilled eaves and a Welsh slate roof. There are two storeys and three bays. In the centre is a projecting porch and a doorway with a fanlight, and the windows are sashes in architraves, those on the upper floor horizontally sliding.
Gaythorpe and Wandern; 54.07224°N 1.22003°W	—	Early 19th century	A pair of cottages in red-brown brick with a swept pantile roof. There are two storeys, and each cottage has one bay. The doorways are paired in the centre and each has a fanlight. They are flanked by bow windows, and on the upper floor are small-paned horizontally sliding sash windows with segmental arches.
Milestone to north of Warehill Lane; 54.06530°N 1.19044°W		Early to mid-19th century	The milestone on the northeast side of the A19 road is in cast iron. It has a triangular plan and sloping top. On the top is the distance to London, the left side has the distance to York, and on the right side is the distance to Easingwold.
Milestone to north of Cross Lanes; 54.08007°N 1.19433°W		Mid-19th century	The milestone on the east side of the A19 road is in cast iron. It has a triangular plan and sloping top. On the top is the distance to London, the left side has the distance to York, and on the right side is the distance to Easingwold.
