= Listed buildings in Easingwold =

Easingwold is a civil parish in the county of North Yorkshire, England. It contains 51 listed buildings that are recorded in the National Heritage List for England. Of these, one is listed at Grade II*, the middle of the three grades, and the others are at Grade II, the lowest grade. The parish contains the town of Easingwold and the surrounding countryside. Most of the listed buildings consist of houses, cottages and associated structures, and the others include churches, shops and offices, a market cross, public houses, mileposts, a former workhouse, a former chapel, a war memorial and a telephone kiosk.

== Key ==
Grade	Criteria
II*	Particularly important buildings of more than special interest
II	Buildings of national importance and special interest

== Buildings ==
Name and location	Photograph	Date	Notes	Grade
Market Cross and Market House; 54.12164°N 1.19207°W		Medieval	The stump of the cross stands on a base of three square steps. It is enclosed by a square canopy dating from the 19th century. This is carried on cast iron columns, and has a hipped Welsh slate roof.	II
St John and All Saints' Church; 54.12358°N 1.19737°W		15th century	The church, which incorporates earlier material, was restored in 1858 by E. G. Paley, and the west vestry was altered in 1991. The church is built in stone, the chancel has a Welsh slate roof, and the rest of the church has a lead roof. The church consists of a nave with a clerestory, north and south aisles, a south porch, a chancel and a west tower. The tower has three stages, angle buttresses, a south clock face, two-light bell openings, and an embattled parapet. In the north wall of the nave is a re-set doorway dating from about 1200, with a pointed arch and moulded capitals.	II*
Tudor House and Cottage; 54.12422°N 1.19063°W		16th century	A pair of houses with a timber framed core, a swept pantile roof with raised verges, and stone coping on the left. Tudor Cottage on the left has two storeys, it is encased in red-brown brick, and has been extended on the left in brick. There are two bays, a stepped floor band, a modern doorway and casement windows. Tudor House has one storey and an attic, and three bays, with exposed timber framing in the upper part and the lower part replaced in pale brown brick, and there is a continuous rear outshut with a catslide roof. The house contains a doorway with a hood, modern windows and two dormers in the roof.	II
190, 192 and 194 Long Street; 54.11852°N 1.18985°W		Early to mid 18th century	A house, later three cottages, in red-brown brick, with a floor band, stepped and dentilled eaves, and a swept pantile roof. There are two storeys and three bays. In the ground floor are three doorways and two bow windows, and the upper floor contains sash windows.	II
White House Cottage; 54.12232°N 1.19239°W		Early to mid 18th century	The house is in red-brown brick, with a floor band, a dentilled cornice, and a pantile roof with raised verges. There are two storeys and four bays. The central doorway has an architrave and an elliptical rubbed-brick arch and jambs. Above it is a blind panel with an elliptical head, and to the right is a passage doorway. The windows are sashes under elliptical brick arches.	II
38 Uppleby; 54.12449°N 1.18862°W		Mid 18th century (probable)	The house is in red-brown brick on plinth, with a stepped floor band, stepped and dentilled eaves, and a pantile roof with a raised verge. There are two storeys and three bays. In the centre is a doorway with pilasters, an architrave, panelled reveals and soffit, an oblong fanlight, and a cornice. The windows are sashes in architraves. Along the front of the house is a brick wall with stone coping, iron railings and a gate, and gate piers with ball finials.	II
Springhead House; 54.12327°N 1.19085°W		Mid 18th century	The house is in red-brown brick, with a stepped floor band, an eaves cornice, and a swept pantile roof with raised verges, and tumbled-in brickwork on the gable end. There are two storeys and two bays. In the centre is a doorway with reeded pilasters, an oblong fanlight and a pediment on consoles. The windows are sashes in architraves, with painted splayed lintels.	II
The New Inn; 54.12081°N 1.19557°W		Mid 18th century (probable)	A coaching inn, later a public house, in red-brown brick, colourwashed on the front, with floor bands and pantile roofs. The main block has three storeys and three bays. In the centre is a doorway with pilasters, an oblong fanlight and an open pediment. To its left is a canted bay window, and the other windows are sashes. To the left is a two-storey three-bay wing containing a segmental-headed carriage entrance. On the right are two two-storey single-bay extensions, containing a canted bay window and a doorway with an oblong fanlight.	II
The White House; 54.12234°N 1.19216°W		Mid 18th century	The house is in pale red-brown brick, with stepped floor bands, a coved eaves cornice, and a pantile roof with raised verges. There are two storeys and six bays, the middle two bays projecting slightly. The doorway has fluted pilasters, an oblong fanlight, and a dentilled open pediment on brackets. The windows are sashes with painted splayed lintels and shutters.	II
28 and 30 Long Street; 54.12150°N 1.19671°W		Mid to late 18th century	A house and a shop in red-brown brick, with a stepped floor band and a pantile roof. There are two storeys and four bays, the second bay projecting slightly, and containing a doorway with a fanlight, and a cornice on consoles. To its right is a shop door and a square shop bay window. Elsewhere, there are sash windows in architraves, with painted splayed lintels and keystones.	II
83, 85 and 87 Long Street; 54.12080°N 1.19609°W		Mid to late 18th century	A house later divided into three, in brown brick, with floor bands, a wooden eaves cornice, and a pantile roof with stone coping and shaped kneelers. In the ground floor are three doorways with oblong fanlights, and three bay windows. Most of the windows in the upper floor are sashes in architraves, with painted wedge lintels.	II
137 and 139 Long Street; 54.11928°N 1.19343°W		Mid to late 18th century	A house divided into two, in red-brown brick with a pantile roof. There are two storeys and four bays. No. 137 has a central doorway with an oblong fanlight and a pediment on consoles, and to the right is a doorway with a plain surround. No. 139 has a doorway with an oblong fanlight in an architrave, and between the doorways are three canted bay windows. The upper floor contains sash windows.	II
Longley House; 54.12033°N 1.19450°W		Mid to late 18th century	An inn converted into flats, in pale brown brick with stucco dressings, quoins, sill bands, and a stone slate roof with stone coping and kneelers. In the centre is a doorway with pilasters, a patterned radial fanlight, and an open dentilled pediment, and the windows are sashes with architraves. Above the doorway they have round-arched heads, the two lower floors in the outer bays contain Venetian windows, in the top floor above they are tripartite, and the other windows have flat heads; all the windows have stucco lintels with keystones.	II
Rocliffe House; 54.12122°N 1.19309°W		Mid to late 18th century	The house is in red-brown brick, with stucco floor bands, a moulded eaves cornice, and a swept pantile roof. There are two storeys and four bays. In the centre is a doorway with reeded pilasters, a decorated radial fanlight, panelled reveals and soffit, and a pediment on consoles. The windows are sashes in flush architraves.	II
56 and 58 Long Street; 54.12086°N 1.19561°W		Late 18th century	A house and a shop in red-brown brick, with stepped and dentilled eaves, and a pantile roof with brick kneelers and tumbled-in brickwork on the gable end. There are two storeys and two bays. On the left is a shopfront, and to its right are a doorway in an architrave with an oblong fanlight and a sash window, both with painted wedge lintels and keystones. The upper floor contains sash window in architraves.	II
36 Uppleby; 54.12448°N 1.18873°W		Late 18th century (probable)	A house in red-brown brick, with a stepped floor band, stepped and dentilled eaves, and a pantile roof. There are two storeys and one bay. To the right is a doorway and the windows are sashes, all in architraves with stuccoed wedge lintels. In the roof is a dormer with a sash window. Along the front of the house is a brick wall with stone coping, and iron railings and a gate.	II
Central Buildings and the Toll Booth; 54.12188°N 1.19222°W		Late 18th century	A row of four shops in red-brown brick, with a pantile roof, stone coping and kneelers. There are two storeys and five bays. In the ground floor are shopfronts, and the upper floor contains sash windows in architraves. On the left return are exterior stairs, and at the rear is a round-arched stair window.	II
Corner Cottage; 54.12227°N 1.19252°W		Late 18th century	The cottage is in red-brown brick with dentilled eaves and a pantile roof. There are two storeys and three bays. In the centre is a doorway with a segmental soldier arch, above the doorway is a blank panel, and the windows are sashes in architraves with soldier arches.	II
Croft House; 54.12131°N 1.19314°W		Late 18th century	The house is in pinkish-brown brick, with stucco bands, a moulded eaves cornice, and a swept pantile roof. There are two storeys and five bays. In the left bay is a carriage entrance, and elsewhere are sash windows in flush architraves, those in the upper floor recessed.	II
Hanover House; 54.12195°N 1.19147°W		Late 18th century	An office in red-brown brick, with a floor band, a modillion eaves cornice, and a swept pantile roof with stone coping and kneelers. There are two storeys and three bays. Steps lead to the central doorway that has alternating block jambs, an oblong fanlight, and a pediment on brackets. To the left is a canted shop bay window, and the other windows are sashes in architraves, with painted brick lintels and keystones.	II
Rose Mount; 54.12452°N 1.18710°W		Late 18th century (probable)	The house is in pale red-brown brick, with a floor band, a cogged eaves band, and a pantile roof with stone coping and kneelers. There are two storeys, four bays, and a rear extension. The main doorway has an oblong fanlight and a cornice on consoles, to the left is a doorway with a plain cornice, and to the right is a passage entry. The windows are sashes, some with stucco lintels. The forecourt is enclosed by a dwarf wall with stone coping and railings, ramped up on the left side.	II
Scaife House; 54.12153°N 1.19323°W		Late 18th century	The house is rendered and has a swept pantile roof. There are two storeys and two bays. In the centre is a doorway with a round-arched porch, a radial fanlight, and a moulded architrave with a keystone.	II
The Mount and Cottage; 54.12363°N 1.19051°W		Late 18th century	The house is in pale red-brown brick, with an eaves cornice, and a pantile roof with stone coping and kneelers. There are three storeys and three bays, the middle bay projecting slightly. In the centre is a doorway with a patterned radial fanlight, and a pediment on consoles. The windows are sashes in architraves, with painted lintels and keystones. To the left is a detached outbuilding with two storeys, one bay, and a hipped roof.	II
The Old Vicarage; 54.12186°N 1.19362°W		Late 18th century	Side wings were added to the vicarage, later a private house, in the early 19th century. The house is in pale reddish-brown brick, with a stepped floor band, and a pantile roof, and two storeys. The original block has three bays, and French doors in the centre. The wings project and each has a single bay and a hipped roof. All the windows are sashes with painted brick lintels and keystones.	II
Allerton House; 54.12446°N 1.18888°W		Late 18th to early 19th century	A house and a cottage, later combined, each with two storeys, and slate roofs with stone coping and kneelers. The house on the right is in red-brown brick and has three bays and dentilled eaves. The central doorway has reeded columns, a decorated radial fanlight, a frieze with roundels, roundels in the spandrels, and a dentilled pediment on consoles. This is flanked by canted bay windows, and in the upper floor are sash windows with architraves, and stuccoed wedge lintels with keystones. The cottage is in pale brown brick and has two bays. The central doorway has an architrave and an oblong fanlight, the windows are sashes in architraves, and all the openings have stuccoed wedge lintels with keystones. Along the front is a dwarf wall with stone coping, and iron railings and a gate.	II
Allonville and Elderslie; 54.12287°N 1.19113°W	—	Late 18th to early 19th century	A house, divided into two, in pale red-brown brick, with a modillion eaves cornice, and a Welsh slate roof with stone coping and kneelers. There are three storeys and three bays. The middle bay projects slightly and contains a doorway with Ionic pilasters, an architrave, a decorative oblong fanlight and a cornice. To the right is a doorway with panelled pilasters, a plain fanlight, and a cornice on brackets. In the ground floor are two canted bay windows, and the upper floor contains sash windows in architraves, those in the middle floor with painted splayed lintels and keystones.	II
The Commercial Public House; 54.12199°N 1.19287°W		Late 18th to early 19th century	The public house is in rendered brick, and has a Welsh slate roof. There are two storeys and three bays. On the front is a doorway with a stuccoed surround and a flat hood, and the windows are sashes.	II
The Villa; 54.12421°N 1.18682°W		1811	The house is in pale brown brick with a pantile roof. The garden front has two storeys, and three bays, and a central cogged pediment with stone obelisks. This is flanked by single-bay side wings, each containing a doorway with fanlights. Most of the windows are sashes, and in the side wings are diamond-shaped windows with concave sides.	II
81 Long Street; 54.12085°N 1.19626°W		Early 19th century	A shop with living accommodation, in brown brick, with a modillion aves cornice, and a pantile roof with stone coping and shaped kneelers. There are three storeys and three bays. In the centre is a doorway with a patterned radial fanlight, and panelled reveals and a soffit in the doorcase, with consoles supporting a dentilled pediment with paterae, and a frieze containing a head. This is flanked by canted bay windows with segmental-headed sashes. Above the doorway is a 20th century window, and the other windows are sashes with painted wedge lintels and keystones.	II
141 and 143 Long Street; 54.11918°N 1.19330°W		Early 19th century	A pair of mirror-image houses in pale brown brick with a pantile roof. There are two storeys and three bays. In the centre are paired round-arched doorways in architraves, with radial fanlights under a red brick arch. The windows are sashes in architraves, with painted wedge lintels.	II
Crawford House; 54.11982°N 1.19426°W		Early 19th century	The house is in pale brown brick with stucco dressings, a floor band, a parapet with a band forming a central pediment, and a concrete tile roof. There are two storeys and three bays. In the central bay is a full height round-arched recess, and a doorway approached by steps with iron railings. The doorway has side lights and a large patterned fanlight under an arched lintel. Above the doorway is a sash window under a stucco fan, and the outer bays contain two-storey canted bay windows.	II
Former shop on the corner of Market Place; 54.12099°N 1.19260°W		Early 19th century	A shop on a corner site, later used for other purposes, in red-brown brick, with cogged eaves and a pantile roof. There are two storeys, three bays on the north front, and two bays on the west front. In the ground floor are doorways with oblong fanlights and bow windows, and the upper floor contains sash windows in architraves with painted wedge lintels and keystones.	II
Normandene and Driffield House; 54.12157°N 1.19325°W		Early 19th century	A pair of houses in pale red-brown brick with a floor band, coved eaves and a pantile roof. There are two storeys and each house has two bays. In the right bay of each house is a doorway with an oblong fanlight and a pediment, to the left is a canted bay window, and in the upper floor are sash windows with painted lintels.	II
Orchard House and Prospect House; 54.12106°N 1.19305°W		Early 19th century	A pair of houses in pale red-brown brick, with a moulded eaves cornice, and a pantile roof with stone coping and kneelers. There are two storeys and five bays, the middle bay projecting slightly. In the right bay is a carriage entrance, and the second and third bays contain doorways, each with a radial fanlight, a frieze with paterae, and a pediment. The left door is flanked by reeded pilasters, and the right door by columns. Elsewhere, there are sash windows with wedge lintels, and in the roof are two dormers.	II
Rowntree House; 54.12090°N 1.19267°W		Early 19th century	A shop and offices in pale red-brown brick with a pantile roof. There are two storeys and five bays. The left bay contains a carriage entrance, and in the fourth bay is a doorway with reeded pilasters, an oblong fanlight, and a modillion pediment on consoles with a lion's head in the frieze. To the right of this is a shopfront, and a doorway with an oblong fanlight. Elsewhere, there are sash windows in architraves, those in the ground floor with splayed lintels.	II
Pair of gates, The Villa; 54.12424°N 1.18721°W		Early 19th century (probable)	The gates are in wrought iron, and about 2 metres (6 ft 7 in) high. Above the lock bar are fleur-de-lys and roundels, and the standards are paired below the lock bar. Above is scrolled cresting.	II
Windross House; 54.12074°N 1.19269°W		Early 19th century	The house is in red-brown brick, with cogged eaves, and a pantile roof with stone coping and kneelers. There are two storeys and three bays. The central doorway has reeded pilasters, an oblong fanlight, and a modillion pediment on consoles. The windows are sashes with splayed painted lintels and keystones.	II
St John the Evangelist's Church; 54.11862°N 1.19222°W		1830–33	A Roman Catholic church designed by Joseph Hansom and altered in 1870. It is in stone with a slate roof, it consists of a single cell with a west porch, and is in Gothic Revival style. The porch has buttresses, and a coped gable with kneelers and a cross finial. The doorway has a pointed arch with a chamfered surround and a hood mould. On the west gable is a bellcote with a pointed arch, and the windows are lancets.	II
135 Long Street; 54.11936°N 1.19354°W		Early to mid 19th century	A shop in pale brown brick with a modillion eaves cornice, three storeys and four bays. In the right bay is a segmental-arched stuccoed carriage arch with a keystone. To the left is a shop front with foliate consoles, and a fascia with modillions. The upper floors contain sash windows with stuccoed wedge lintels and keystones.	II
Hey House; 54.12401°N 1.18959°W		Early to mid 19th century	A pair of houses in red and pale brown brick, with a pantile roof, stone coping and kneelers. There are two storeys and four bays, the middle two bays slightly projecting. On the front are two doorways each with pilasters, an oblong fanlight and a pediment on consoles. The windows are sashes with stuccoed wedge lintels and keystones.	II
Hollins Grove Farmhouse; 54.11209°N 1.16947°W		Early to mid 19th century	The farmhouse is in red-brown brick and has a Welsh slate roof with stone coping and kneelers. There are two storeys and three bays. The central doorway has a round-headed fanlight, the windows are sashes, and above all the openings are stucco fans.	II
Milepost, Long Street; 54.11973°N 1.19366°W		Early to mid 19th century	The milepost on the northeast side of Long Street is in cast iron and has a triangular plan and a sloping top. On the top is the distance to London, on the left side is the distance to York, and on the right is inscribed "EASINGWOLD".	II
Milepost, Stillington Road; 54.11428°N 1.17864°W	—	Early to mid 19th century	The milepost on the southwest side of Stillington Road is in cast iron and has a triangular plan. Inscribed on it are "NRYCC" and the distances to Stillington and Easingwold.	II
Milepost, Thirsk Road; 54.12975°N 1.21516°W	—	Early to mid 19th century	The milepost on the north side of Thirsk Road (A19 road) is in cast iron and has a triangular plan. Inscribed on it are the distances to Thirsk and to Easingwold.	II
Milepost, York Road (north); 54.10839°N 1.19428°W		Early to mid 19th century	The milepost on the east side of York Road is in cast iron and has a triangular plan and a sloping top. On the top is the distance to London, on the left side is the distance to York, and on the right side to Easingwold.	II
Milepost, York Road (south); 54.09412°N 1.19423°W		Early to mid 19th century	The milepost on the east side of York Road (A19 road) is in cast iron and has a triangular plan and a sloping top. On the top is the distance to London, on the left side is the distance to York, and on the right side to Easingwold.	II
Three storey building, Market Place; 54.12100°N 1.19236°W		Early to mid 19th century	A pair of shops in pale pinkish-brown brick with a Welsh slate roof, stone coping and kneelers. There are three storeys and four bays. In the ground floor are shopfronts and two doorways with architraves, and the upper floors contain sash windows with channelled stucco lintels.	II
1–13 Cedar Place; 54.12613°N 1.18481°W		1837–38	Originally Easingwold Union Workhouse and later converted into flats, it is in pale brown brick, with a stuccoed floor band and a Welsh slate roof. The central range has two storeys and five bays, and is flanked by gabled cross-wings with three storeys and one bay. In the centre is a doorway with a fanlight in a round-arched recess, and the windows are sashes. The cross-wings contain tripartite sash windows, and in the top floor are Diocletian windows.	II
Blayds House; 54.12330°N 1.19126°W		1840	A Methodist chapel, later converted into flats, in pale brown brick with a Welsh slate roof. There are two storeys and five bays. Each bay contains a full height recessed arch with a painted impost block. In the centre, steps lead up to a doorway with a radial fanlight, the windows are round-arched sashes, and all the openings have red brick arches. In the ground floor is an impost band.	II
War memorial 54.12213°N 1.19190°W		c. 1920	The war memorial in Market Place is in granite, and consists of an obelisk with a gabled top, on a double plinth and a base of three steps. On the east and west fronts are raised panels with inscriptions, above which is a metal laurel wreath. On the east face are the names of those lost in the First World War and, on the west face, those lost in the Second World War.	II
Telephone kiosk 54.12435°N 1.18755°W		1935	The K6 type telephone kiosk in Uppleby was designed by Giles Gilbert Scott. Constructed in cast iron with a square plan and a dome, it has three unperforated crowns in the top panels.	II
