= Listed buildings in Stillington, North Yorkshire =

Stillington is a civil parish in the county of North Yorkshire, England. It contains 18 listed buildings that are recorded in the National Heritage List for England. Of these, one is listed at Grade II*, the middle of the three grades, and the others are at Grade II, the lowest grade. The parish contains the village of Stillington and the surrounding countryside. Apart from a church and two mileposts, all the listed buildings are houses and cottages in the village.

== Key ==
Grade	Criteria
II*	Particularly important buildings of more than special interest
II	Buildings of national importance and special interest

== Buildings ==
Name and location	Photograph	Date	Notes	Grade
St Nicholas' Church; 54.10308°N 1.10979°W		Late 15th century	The church, which incorporates some earlier material, has been altered and extended during the centuries, including much rebuilding in 1840. It is built in stone with a Welsh slate roof, and consists of a nave, north and south aisles, a south porch, a chancel and a west tower. The tower has two stages, a south clock face, a string course, two-light bell openings, and an embattled parapet. The east window is in Perpendicular style, with a four-centred arched head and five lights.	II*
Dene House; 54.10298°N 1.10703°W	—	17th century	The house was extended in the 19th century with the addition of a new range at right angles facing the street. The earlier part has a timber framed core and red brick outer walls on a cobble foundation, and a pantile roof. There is one storey and an attic, and three bays. It contains a doorway, two sash windows and dormers. The later part is in pale brown brick with a Welsh slate roof, two storeys and three bays. The central doorway has an oblong fanlight, and the windows are sashes.	II
Fairview; 54.10277°N 1.11157°W	—	17th century	The cottage is in pale red-brown brick, with a dentilled eaves band, and a pantile roof with a raised verge. There are two storeys and two bays. On the front are two doorways, the left one blocked, and the windows are horizontally sliding sashes. The ground floor openings have segmental brick soldier arches, and the upper floor windows break through the eaves band.	II
Famars; 54.10299°N 1.10636°W	—	Late 17th century (or earlier)	The cottage is in red brick, whitewashed on the front, with stepped and dentilled eaves, and a steeply pitched swept pantile roof with raised verges. There is one storey and an attic, and two bays. The central doorway has an architrave, and the windows are horizontally sliding sashes, those in the ground floor with shutters, and above in dormers. Inside, there is an inglenook fireplace.	II
Cottage Farmhouse; 54.10323°N 1.11414°W	—	Early 18th century (probable)	The farmhouse, which has been extended, is in reddish-brown brick, with a floor band, stepped and dentilled eaves and a pantile roof. There are two storeys and three bays, and a rear outshut. On the front is a doorway, and the windows are sashes, those in the upper floor horizontally sliding.	II
1 Northside; 54.10272°N 1.11113°W	—	Early to mid-18th century (probable)	The cottage is in red-brown brick on a plinth, with stepped and dentilled eaves, and a swept pantile roof with tumbled-in brickwork. There are two storeys and one bay. The doorway is on the right, and the windows are horizontally sliding sashes.	II
2 and 3 Northside; 54.10273°N 1.11122°W	—	Early to mid-18th century (probable)	A cottage, later divided into two, it is in red-brown brick on a plinth, with stepped and dentilled eaves, and a steeply-pitched swept pantile roof with raised verges and tumbled-in brickwork to the gable. There are two storeys and two bays. On the front are three doorways, the left one blocked, and horizontally sliding sash windows.	II
Cobble Cottage and Sycamore Cottage; 54.10298°N 1.10789°W	—	Early to mid-18th century	A pair of cottages in brown brick, with a floor band, stepped and dentilled eaves and a pantile roof. There are two storeys and four bays. Cobble Cottage, on the right, has a central doorway with a flat hood, and sash windows in architraves. Sycamore Cottage has a doorway on the right, to the left are two bow windows, and the upper floor contains modern casement windows.	II
Wren House; 54.10273°N 1.11137°W	—	Late 18th century (probable)	The house is in pale brown brick on a plinth, with red brick dressings, a floor band, stepped and dentilled eaves, and a tile roof with raised verges. There are two storeys and three bays. The central doorway has a flat hood, and the windows are modern casements, most in original openings, under flat brick arches.	II
Fairview Cottage; 54.10275°N 1.11148°W	—	Late 18th century	The cottage is in red-brown brick, with stepped and dentilled eaves, and a swept pantile roof with a raised verge. There are two storeys and one bay. The doorway is on the right, and the windows are sashes in architraves.	II
The Cottage; 54.10268°N 1.10634°W	—	Late 18th century (probable)	The house is in pale brown brick with red brick dressings, a floor band, stepped and dentilled eaves, and a swept pantile roof with rendered raised verges. There are two storeys and three bays. The central doorway has an architrave, above it is a blind panel, and the windows are sashes in architraves. All the openings have flat red brick arches.	II
Weddels Cottage; 54.10269°N 1.10656°W	—	Late 18th century (probable)	The house is in pale brown brick with red brick dressings, a floor band, stepped and dentilled eaves, and a French tile roof with a raised verge and a kneeler, and tumbled-in brickwork on the right. There are two storeys and three bays. The doorway is in the centre, and the windows are modern casements under gauged flat red brick arches.	II
Admiral House; 54.10301°N 1.11341°W	—	Late 18th or early 19th century	The house is in rendered brick on a plinth, with a floor band, a wooden modillion eaves cornice and a Welsh slate roof. There are two storeys and seven bays. The central doorway has reeded pilasters, a radial fanlight and an open pediment, and the windows are sashes.	II
Chandlers; 54.10297°N 1.10602°W	—	Early to mid-19th century	The house is in reddish-brown brick, with stepped and cogged eaves, and a pantile roof with stone coping and kneelers. There are two storeys and four bays. The doorway has a stuccoed surround, with pilasters, an oblong fanlight, and a modillion hood. The windows are sashes with gauged flat brick arches. Enclosing the front garden is a low brick wall with stone coping and cast iron railings with fleur-de-lys finials.	II
The Folly; 54.10399°N 1.11494°W	—	Early to mid-19th century	The house is in pale brown brick, and has a Welsh slate roof with stone gable coping and kneelers. There are two storeys and three bays, and lower flanking extensions. The central doorway has an oblong fanlight and an open pediment. The windows are sashes in architraves, with gauged flat brick arches.	II
Wandell House; 54.10296°N 1.10752°W	—	Early to mid-19th century	The house is in pale brown brick on a plinth, with stepped and cogged eaves, and a pantile roof with stone coping and kneelers. There are two storeys and three bays, and a lower single-bay on the right. The main part has three recessed segmental arches with stucco impost blocks. The middle arch contains a doorway with an oblong fanlight, and in the outer arches are sash windows in architraves. On the upper floor are squat sash windows, and all the openings have gauged brick flat arches.	II
Milepost at NGR 552683; 54.11137°N 1.15732°W		Mid to late 19th century	The milepost on the south side of West Road is in cast iron, and has a triangular plan and a sloping top. On the top is inscribed "NRYCC", on the left side is the distance to Easingwold, and on the right side is the distance to Stillington.	II
Milepost at NGR 567682; 54.10655°N 1.1342532°W		Mid to late 19th century	The milepost on the south side of West Road is in cast iron, and has a triangular plan and a sloping top. On the top is inscribed "NRYCC", on the left side is the distance to Easingwold, and on the right side is the distance to Stillington.	II
