= New Inn, Easingwold =

Listed former pub in North Yorkshire, England

New Inn
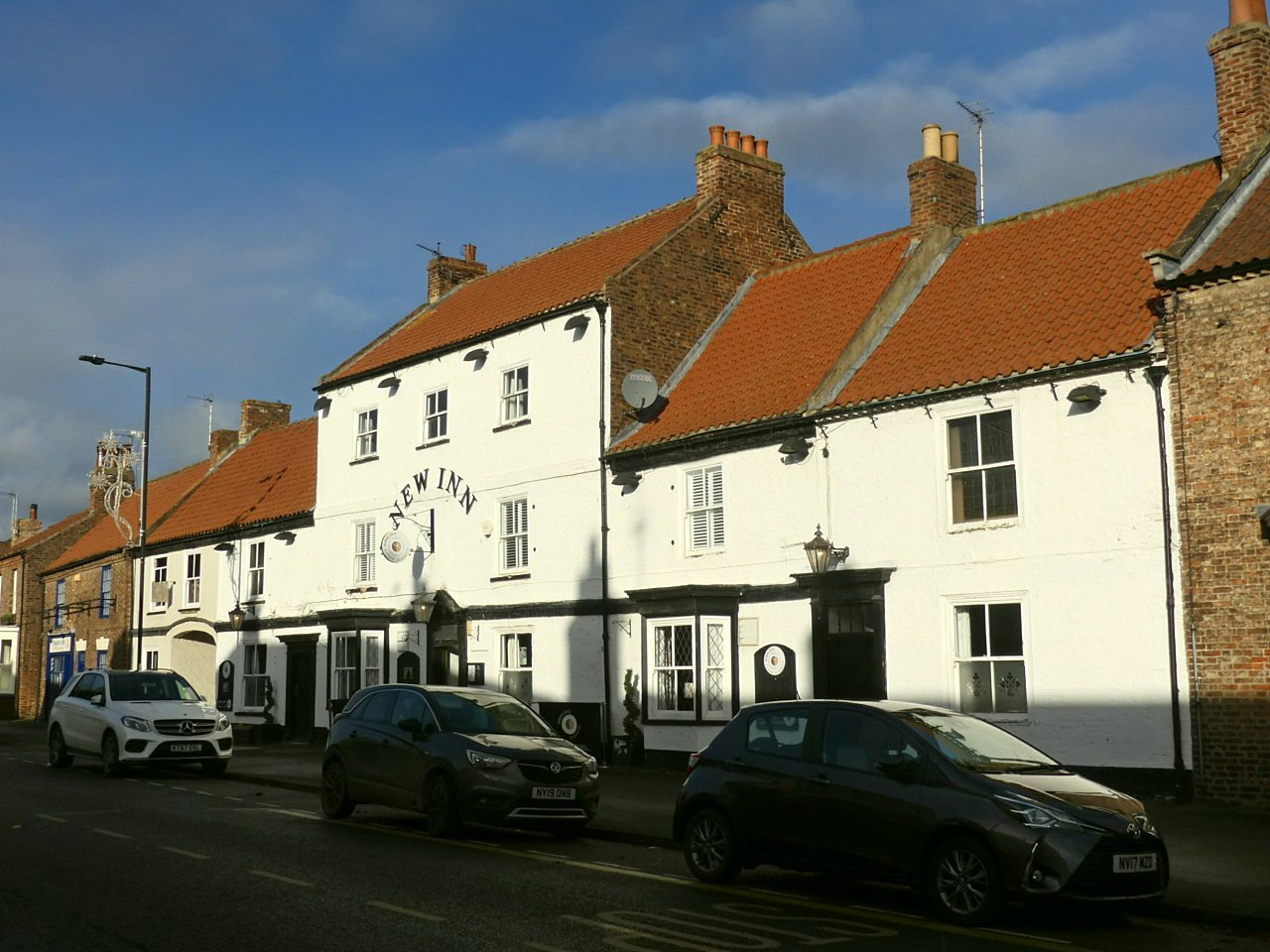
- The former pub in 2022
- Interactive map of the New Inn area

General information
- Status: Converted into a restaurant and café
- Type: Public house (former)
- Location: Long Street, Easingwold, North Yorkshire, England
- Coordinates: 54.12084°N 1.19563°W
- Year built: Mid-18th century (probable)
- Closed: 2020 (as a pub)

Design and construction
- Designations

Listed Building – Grade II
- Official name: The New Inn
- Designated: 27 September 1984
- Reference no.: 1151246

The New Inn is a former public house on Long Street in Easingwold, a town in North Yorkshire, in England.

The pub was built in the mid-18th century, on Long Street in Easingwold. It was one of two coaching inns in the town, the other being the Rose and Crown. Most stagecoaches stopped at the inn, while the Royal Mail and Highflyer coaches changed horses there. About eight post horses were kept in stables at the rear of the inn. The doors and windows of the inn were altered in the 19th century, and there were further changes in the 20th century. The building was Grade II listed in 1984. By 2014, the business operated as a pub, with a restaurant area, central bar and lounge area. In 2019, it was part of the small West Park Inns group. The New Inn closed in 2020 and was converted into a restaurant and café.

The pub is built of red-brown brick, colourwashed on the front, with floor bands and pantile roofs. The main block has three storeys and three bays. In the centre is a doorway with pilasters, an oblong fanlight and an open pediment. To its left is a canted bay window, and the other windows are sashes. To the left is a two-storey three-bay wing containing a segmental-headed carriage entrance. On the right are two two-storey single-bay extensions, containing a canted bay window and a doorway with an oblong fanlight.

== See also ==
- Listed buildings in Easingwold
