= St Mary's Church, Alne =

Church in Alne, North Yorkshire, England

Coordinates: 54°04′54″N 1°14′41″W

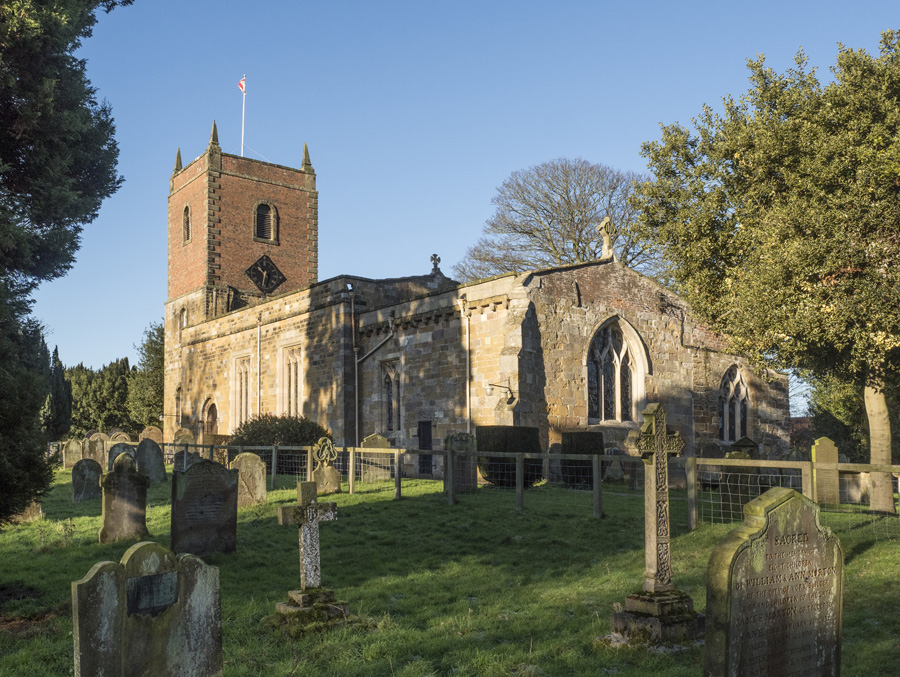
The church, in 2017

St Mary's Church is the parish church of Alne, North Yorkshire, in England.

The oldest parts of the church date from around 1100, at which time, it consisted of a chancel and nave. Other than the chancel arch and perhaps the chancel door, the church was rebuilt in about 1150, in a similar manner but with the addition of a west tower. A north aisle was added in the 13th century, followed by a new east window and north chapel in the 14th century. In the 15th century, the chapel was largely rebuilt, and the piers of the nave arcade were rebuilt. The wooden tower was blown down in the mid-18th century and was rebuilt in 1766, when various other repairs were undertaken. The church was Grade I listed in 1960.

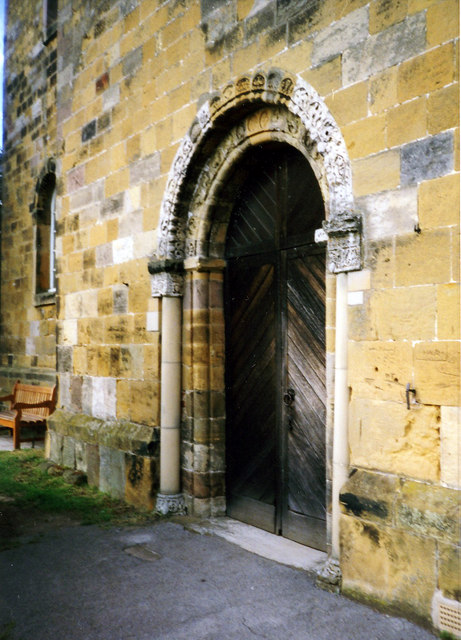
The south nave doorway

The church is built of sandstone, with the tower and northern parapet being in brick. 12th-century carvings include animals, Agnus Dei, the signs of the zodiac, and Labours of the Months around the south door of the nave, and a serpent held by eagles on the lintel of the south door of the chancel. Inside, there is a Norman font, an octagonal oak pulpit dated 1626, and an early-14th century alabaster effigy.

== See also ==
- Listed buildings in Alne, North Yorkshire
