= Easingwold Town Hall =

Municipal building in Easingwold, North Yorkshire, England

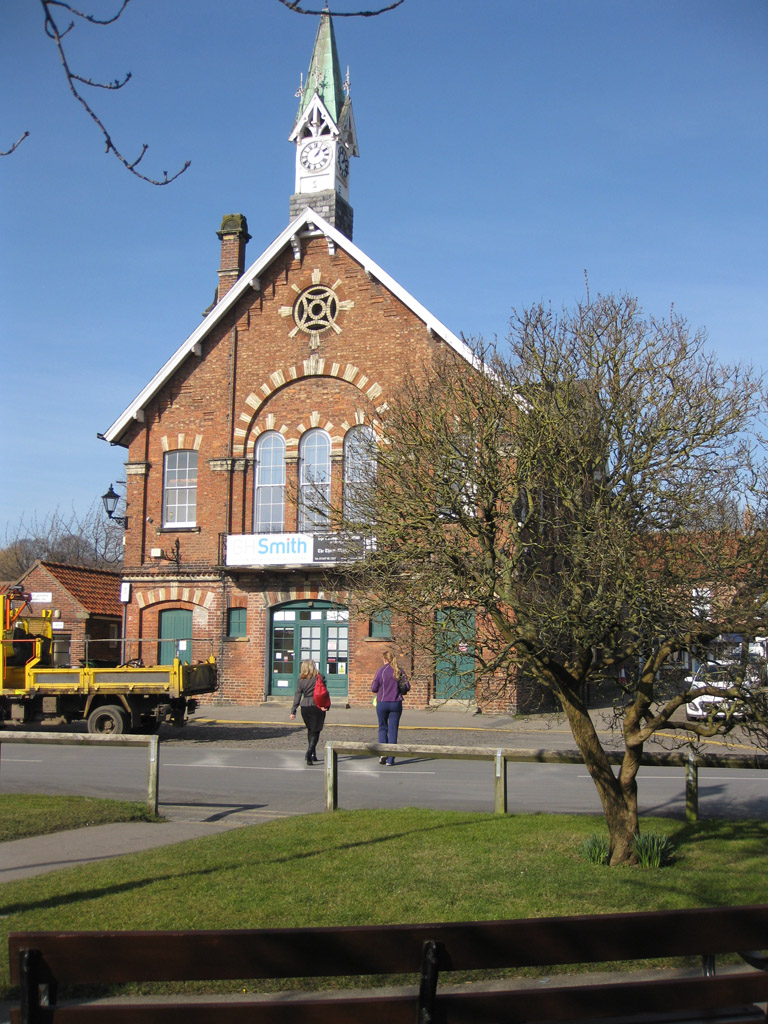
- Easingwold Town Hall

- Shown in North Yorkshire
- 54.1216°N 1.1923°W
- Location: Market Place, Easingwold

History
- Built: 1864

Site notes
- Architect: Edward Taylor
- Architectural style: Victorian style

Easingwold Town Hall is a municipal building in the Market Place in Easingwold, North Yorkshire, England. The structure was used as an events venue and is now used as a commercial printing centre, producing The Easingwold Advertiser & Weekly News.

== History ==
In the mid-19th century, a group of local businessmen decided to form a company to raise funds for the erection of an events venue in the town: the site they selected was occupied by a shambles, which had been the local place for meat trading.

The new building was designed by Edward Taylor in the Victorian style, built in red and buff bricks at a cost of £1,423 and was officially opened on 31 March 1864. The design involved a symmetrical main frontage with three bays facing the south edge of the Market Place; the central bay featured a wide arched opening on the ground floor and three tall round headed windows on the first floor. The windows on the first floor were framed by a brick arch and surmounted by a gable containing an oculus. The outer bays contained doorways with segmental surrounds on the ground floor and segmental headed sash windows on the first floor. The side elevations were fenestrated in a similar style and stretched back eight bays. Internally, the principal rooms were a large market hall on the ground floor and an assembly hall and a committee room on the first floor. The architectural historian, Nikolaus Pevsner, was critical of the design and described the structure as a "brute" of a building.

The assembly hall was used for regular petty session hearings and the annual meeting of the court leet from an early stage and a clock tower with a spire was installed on the roof in 1869. A meeting to secure support from local people for the proposed Easingwold Railway took place in the town hall under the chairmanship of Sir George Wombwell in October 1887: the project subsequently got underway was completed in July 1891.

The company which had developed the building, the "Easingwold Public Hall Company", got into financial difficulties and was wound up in 1892 and, in an attempt to diversify community use of the building, a minute rifle range was established on the ground floor in the early 20th century. The building then operated as a cinema for much of the first half of the 20th century.

The town hall was acquired by a printing business, G. H. Smith & Son, in the late 1950s, and converted for use as a commercial printing centre: print production of The Easingwold Advertiser & Weekly News got underway in the building in November 1959.
