= Easingwold Union Workhouse =

Building in Easingwold, North Yorkshire, England

Coordinates: 54°07′34″N 1°11′05″W

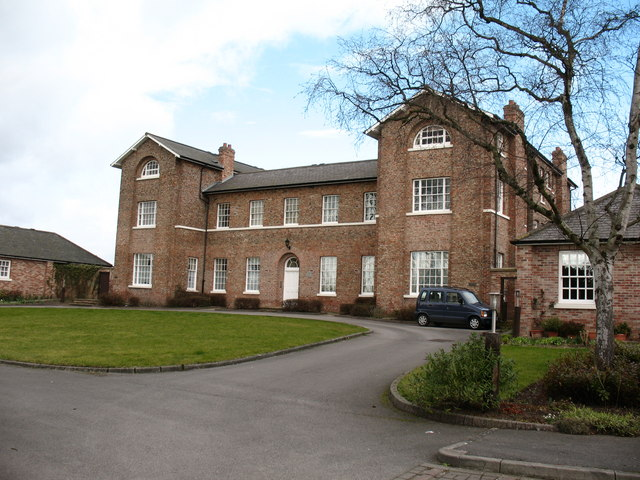
The building, in 2008

Easingwold Union Workhouse is a historic building in Easingwold, a town in North Yorkshire, in England.

A workhouse was first recorded in Easingwold in 1756. A Poor Law Union was created in 1837, and it constructed a new workhouse, which was completed in 1838. It was designed by J. B. and W. Atkinson, and its construction cost about £2,600. It could house 130 people, the first of whom were admitted in October 1838. In 1934, North Riding County Council converted the building into the Claypenny Hospital, for mentally disabled people. Various other buildings were constructed, expanding the hospital's capacity to just under 400 patients. It came to focus on people with the most severe disabilities; and also on children. The hospital closed in 1993. The other hospital buildings were demolished, but the workhouse had been grade II listed in 1984 and so was instead converted into flats.

The building is constructed of pale brown brick, with a stuccoed floor band and a Welsh slate roof. The central range has two storeys and five bays, and is flanked by gabled cross-wings with three storeys and one bay. In the centre is a doorway with a fanlight in a round-arched recess, and the windows are sashes. The cross-wings contain tripartite sash windows, and in the top floor are Diocletian windows.

== See also ==
- Listed buildings in Easingwold
