= St John and All Saints' Church, Easingwold =

Coordinates: 54.1236°N 1.1974°W

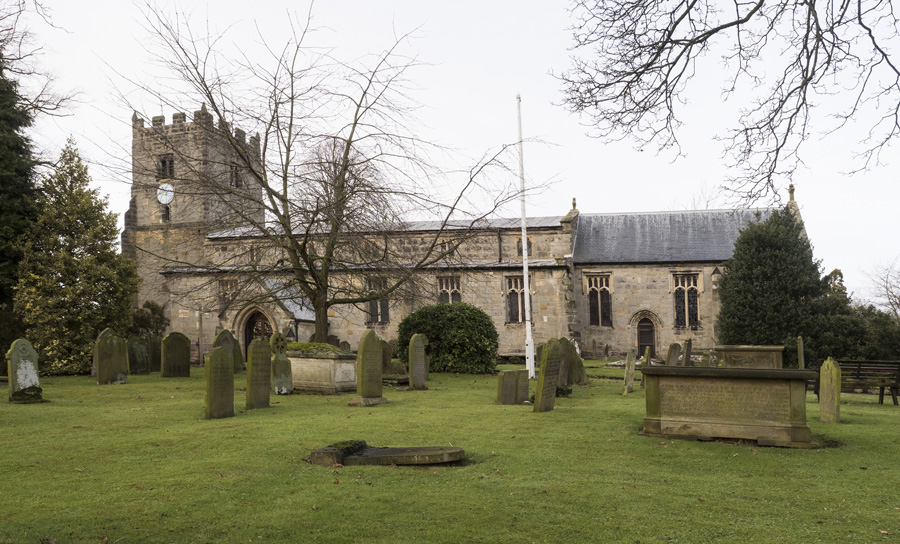
- St John and All Saints' Church, Easingwold, from the south

- Location in North Yorkshire
- OS grid reference: SE 526,700
- Location: Easingwold. North Yorkshire
- Country: England
- Denomination: Anglican
- Churchmanship: Central
- Website: St John and All Saints, Easingwold

History
- Status: Parish church
- Dedication: Saint John the Baptist; All Saints

Architecture
- Functional status: Active
- Heritage designation: Grade II*
- Designated: 17 May 1960
- Architect: E. G. Paley (restoration)
- Architectural type: Church
- Style: Gothic

Administration
- Province: York
- Diocese: York
- Archdeaconry: York
- Deanery: Easingwold
- Parish: Easingwold with Raskelf

Clergy
- Vicar: Revd Richard Grant

St John and All Saints' Church is in the town of Easingwold. North Yorkshire, England. It is an active Anglican parish church in the deanery of Easingwold, the archdeaconry of York, and the diocese of York. Its benefice is united with that of St Mary, Raskelf. The church is recorded in the National Heritage List for England as a designated Grade II* listed building.

== History ==
The present church dates mainly from the 15th century, although it contains possible remains of older fabric and a re-set 12th-century doorway. In 1853 the church was restored, and a porch was added, by the Lancaster architect E. G. Paley in memory of his father who had been the vicar of the church between 1812 and 1839. A further restoration was carried out in 1858 by the same architect.

In April 1913 the daughter of the vicar Rev Halsall Segar, Maud, married Eric Scorer. His daughter had sons architect Sam Scorer and meteorologist Richard S. Scorer.

== Architecture ==
=== Exterior ===
The church is constructed in ashlar. The roof of the chancel is slate; the roofs elsewhere are covered in lead. The plan of the church consists of a five-bay nave with a clerestory, north and south aisles, a south porch, a three-bay chancel, and a west tower. The tower is in three stages, with angle buttresses and an embattled parapet. It originally had an open west porch, but this has been blocked and a door and a window have been inserted. The windows on the sides of the nave and chancel have two lights with panel tracery, and are flat-headed. The east window has three lights with Decorated tracery. The re-set 12th-century doorway is in the north wall of the nave.

=== Interior ===
Inside the church the arcades are supported by octagonal piers. The church contains a monument dated 1713 with Ionic pilasters, a broken pediment and a hatchment. The two-manual organ was made in 1903 by Abbott and Smith of Leeds, and was restored in 1990 by Principal Pipe Organs. There is a ring of eight bells. The oldest and heaviest five bells date from 1788 and were cast by Robert Dalton, one bell dates from 1887 and is by John Warner & Sons, and the latest and lightest two bells were cast in 1950 by Gillett & Johnston.

== See also ==
- Grade II* listed churches in North Yorkshire (district)
- Listed buildings in Easingwold
- List of works by Sharpe and Paley
