= Listed buildings in Youlton =

Youlton is a civil parish in the county of North Yorkshire, England. It contains four listed buildings that are recorded in the National Heritage List for England. All the listed buildings are designated at Grade II, the lowest of the three grades, which is applied to "buildings of national importance and special interest". The parish contains the village of Youlton and the surrounding area. All the listed buildings are near the centre of the village, and consist of houses and associated structures.

== Buildings ==
Name and location	Photograph	Date	Notes
Youlton Hall; 54.06442°N 1.25129°W		16th century	The house has been much altered and rebuilt. It has a timber framed core, it has been encased in brick, and has stepped and dentilled eaves, and a pantile roof with stepped brick kneelers and a shaped gable with coping. There are two storeys and an L-shaped plan, consisting of a hall on the left with a Dutch gable, and a wing at right angles on the right. The doorway has a frieze and a cornice, and the windows are sashes, some horizontally sliding. Inside, there are two inglenook fireplaces.
Maiden's Folly; 54.06515°N 1.25197°W		Late 17th to early 18th century	The house is in orange brick, with a floor band, stepped and cogged eaves, and a swept pantile roof with brick kneelers and coping. There are two storeys, four bays and a rear outshut. The doorway has reeded engaged columns, a fanlight, a frieze and a cornice. The windows are casements, on the ground floor they are tripartite, and those on the upper floor have two lights. At the rear are horizontally sliding sash windows.
Chapel Farmhouse; 54.06512°N 1.25134°W		Early 18th century	The house is in red-brown brick on a plinth, with a floor band, and a pantile roof with shaped kneelers and stone coping. There are two storeys and an attic, and a gabled front of three bays. The central doorway has pilasters, a tripartite fanlight, consoles and a dentilled cornice. The windows are sashes in architraves with segmental brick arches. On the attic is a window in a semicircular recess, and on the returns are stepped and dentilled eaves.
Wall, railings and gate, Maiden's Folly; 54.06504°N 1.25187°W		Early 19th century	Enclosing the front garden is a low brick wall with stone coping. The railings and gate are in cast iron with pointed finials. The gate posts have lilies at the top and bottom and ball finials.
