= River Kyle =

River in North Yorkshire, England

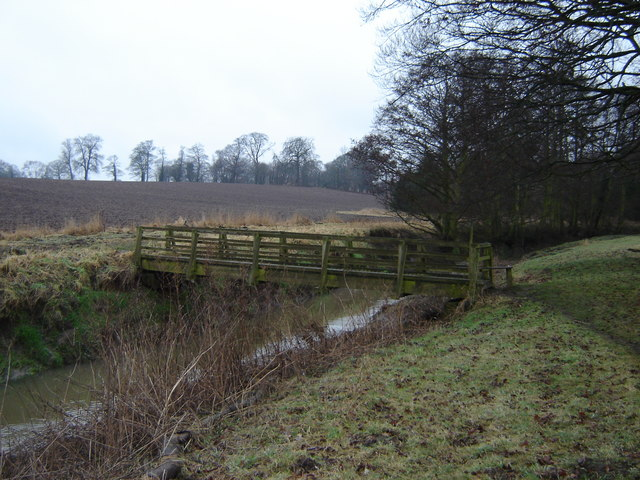
- Footbridge over River Kyle at Alne; 54°4′41.41″N 1°14′28.56″W

Location
- Country: England

Physical characteristics
- Source
  - location: Confluence of Derrings Beck and Carle Beck nr Tholthorpe
  - coordinates: 54°5′24″N 1°15′38″W
  - elevation: 12 metres (39 ft)
- Mouth
  - location: River Ouse nr Newton-on-Ouse
  - coordinates: 54°2′5″N 1°13′28″W
  - elevation: 11 metres (36 ft)
- Length: 5.8 mi (9.3 km)

The River Kyle is a small river in North Yorkshire, England. At just under 6 miles (9.7 km) long, it is one of the shortest classified main rivers in the country.

== Course ==
The river is first called Kyle after the confluence of Carle Beck and Derrings Beck. From the confluence it flows south-east of the village of Tholthorpe, near Easingwold, past Flawith, Alne and Tollerton. At Linton-on-Ouse it turns south and joins the River Ouse just north of Newton-on-Ouse. From source to mouth, the river extends to just 5.8 miles (9 km) in length.

The Kyle is noted for its recurrent problems with pollution caused by agricultural effluent. In 1978, the water from the river became polluted after a barn fire had been extinguished and the water used to douse the fire had found its way into the River Kyle. Some of the pollution was a paraquat based weedkiller which is lethal in high concentrations and for which there is no antidote. As the City of York took its water supply from the River Ouse, they had to close their river intakes for two weeks to allow the polluted water to be flushed downriver.

== History ==
The river previously formed the boundary of the Forest of Galtres. During the Second World War, RAF Bomber Command operated an airfield near the start of the River Kyle at RAF Tholthorpe. Both the Royal Air Force and the Royal Canadian Air Force flew from this base until its closure in 1945. The river also passes close to the current airfield at RAF Linton-on-Ouse, which was originally opened in 1937 as part of RAF Bomber Command.

=== Etymology ===
The name of the river derives from the Brittonic *cǖl, meaning "narrow" (Welsh, Cornish and Breton cul). The place-name Alne possibly preserves an earlier alternative name for the river.

== Leisure ==
There are two Ordnance Survey Leisure Walking routes that cross the river near Tollerton.

== Lists ==
=== Tributaries ===
- Whitecarr Ings Beck
- New Parks Beck
- Scawsykes Beck
- Shorn Dike

=== Settlements ===
- Tholthorpe
- Alne
- Flawith
- Tollerton
- Linton-on-Ouse
- Newton-on-Ouse

=== Crossings ===
- Alne Bridge, Alne
- Carrholme Bridge, Near Tollerton
- Linton Bridge, near Newton-on-Ouse

== Gallery ==
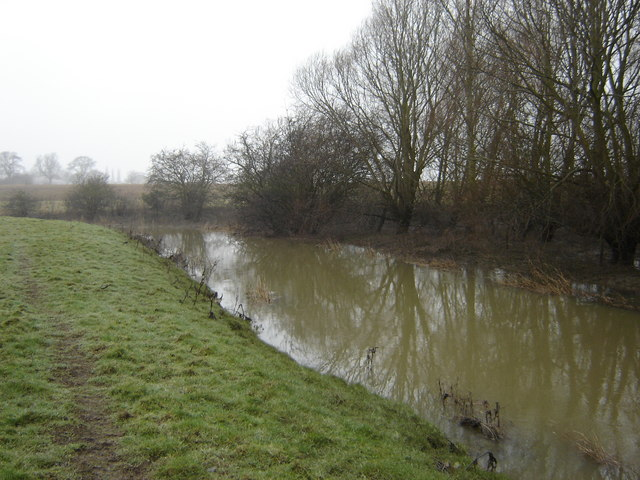
River Kyle north of Linton-on-Ouse

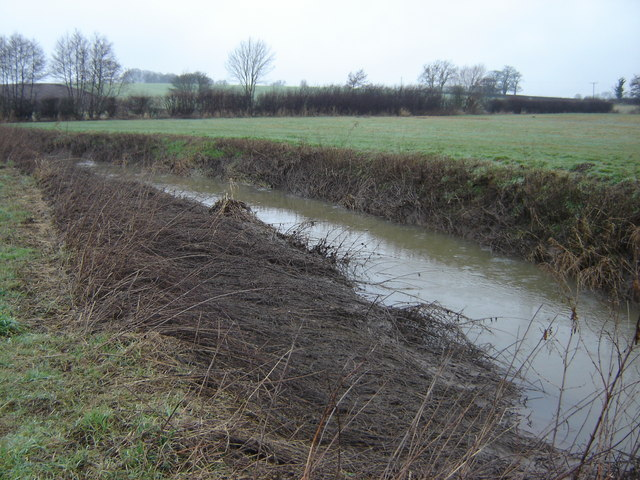
River Kyle at Tollerton

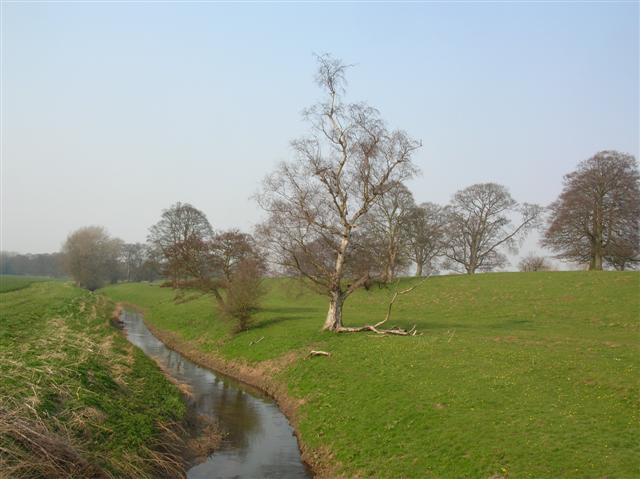
River Kyle from Carrholme Bridge

== Sources ==
- Ordnance Survey Open Viewer https://www.ordnancesurvey.co.uk/business-government/tools-support/open-data-support
- Google Earth
- National Environment Research Council - Centre for Ecology and Hydrology http://www.ceh.ac.uk/index.html
- Environment Agency http://www.environment-agency.gov.uk/
