= York Handmade Brick Company =

Brickmakers in Yorkshire, England

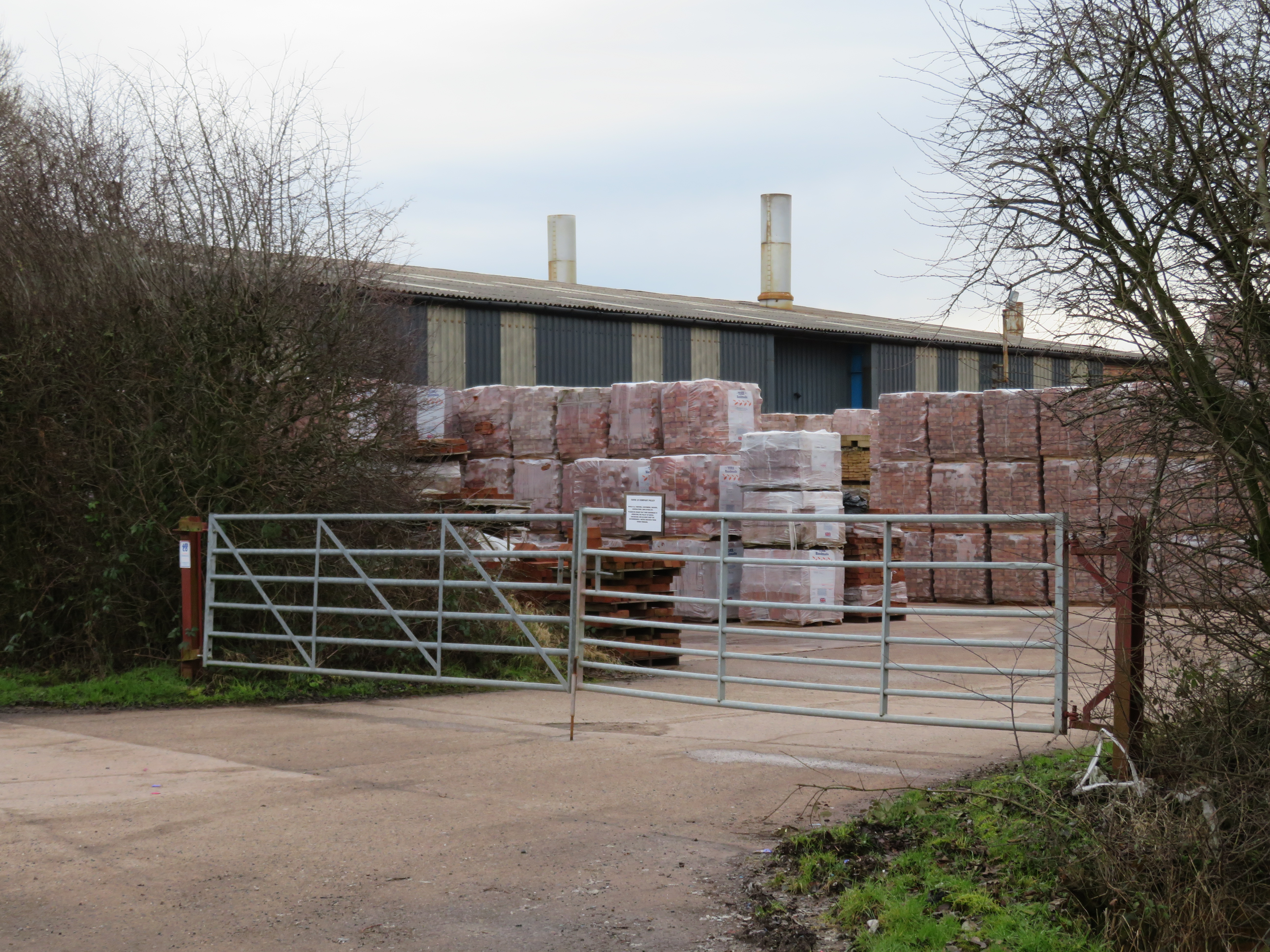
- Type: Private
- Industry: Brickmaking
- Predecessor: Alne Brick Co and York Handmade Brick
- Founded: 1988
- Founder: Tim Bristow, David Armitage
- Headquarters: Alne, North Yorkshire, England
- Key people: David Armitage (chairman)
- Revenue: £2.275 million (2018–19)
- Number of employees: 30 (2019)
- Website: Official website

The York Handmade Brick Company is a specialist brickmaker based in the village of Alne, North Yorkshire, England. The company was founded in 1988 from a previous brickmaking venture on the same site and has won many awards for projects that its bricks have been used in, and has supplied bricks for several notable buildings throughout the United Kingdom.

== History ==
A company named either Alne Brickwork Co. or Alnebrick had been operating on the site at Alne since the 1930s when it was bought in 1988 by Tim Bristow and David Armitage, who retains the chairmanship, though his son runs the day-to-day business. The brickworks is located in Forest Lane, Alne, and was also formerly a pipeworks with excellent clay resources on site which had been utilised for brick-making since the 1930s. Up until 1986, a narrow-gauge 2-foot (0.61 m) brickworks railway also operated on the site conveying quarried clay to the working sheds. The new company applied for an extension to its quarrying area and in 1998, a 25-year operation started that would yield over 500,000 tonnes (550,000 tons) of clay from the land surrounding the works.

In the financial year 2018–2019, the company turnover was £2.5 million and it had 30 employees.

Besides having its bricks used in buildings such as The Shard and London Bridge railway station, the company's London Yellow bricks are also used for housebuilding in the Greater London area, which saw York Handmade produce over 130,000 bricks for this market. A contract in 2010 to supply 400,000 bricks for Chetham's School of Music was valued at over £500,000.

The company have also supplied bricks for repairing bridges over the River Swale in North Yorkshire, larger bricks to repair the city walls of Rostok in Germany and they have also been exported to America and Japan. One of their most expensive brick creations was for the One Molyneux Street housing complex in Marylebone in London. Each brick cost £793, with 116,000 being used in the construction. According to one property journalist, the bricks are the second most expensive ever created.

In 2012, the company was featured in an episode of the Guy Martin fronted programme How Britain Worked. The team at York Handmade helped Martin create a brick in an episode entitled Coal. In 2014, the company was asked to supply 47,000 bricks for a restoration project at Dumfries House in Ayrshire. The bricks themselves resembled the ones used at Hampton Court Palace and were designed by Prince Charles.

In December 2025, it was announced the company had been acquired by the private equity firm, 4D Capital Partners. The acquisition, which averted a potential administration process, resulted in the company becoming part of 4D Capital Partners’ building products group alongside Hepworth Clay.

== Significant projects ==
- 2009 – Highbury Stadium, 20,000 bricks
- 2010 – Chetham's School of Music in Manchester, 400,000 bricks
- 2010 – North York Moors Railway new visitor centre at Pickering railway station, 18,000 bricks
- 2011 – The Shard, 70,000 bricks
- 2013 – Jack Berry's House, a rehabilitation centre for injured jockeys in Malton, North Yorkshire, 50,000 bricks
- 2014 – York Racecourse, 80,000 bricks
- 2017 – Central Library in Halifax, 30,000 bricks
- 2017 – Turweston Airfield air traffic control centre in Buckinghamshire, 100,000 bricks
- 2018 – Pocklington School (Art & Design Technology Centre) 31,000 bricks
- 2018 – St Bride's Church, East Kilbride, 12,000 bricks
- 2019 – London Bridge railway station (and London Bridge Palace), 200,000 bricks
- 2019 – One Molyneux Street Marylebone, 116,000 bricks
- 2019 – St Albans Cathedral, 30,000 specialist bricks
- 2019 – Jesus College, Cambridge, 20,000 specialist bricks to renovate the Porter's Lodge in the college

== Awards ==
- 1995 – Supreme Brick Building award for St Bridget's Church in Belfast
- 2005 – Brick Development Association award for work on the walled garden at Scampston Hall, near Malton
- 2015 – Brick Awards (best outdoor space) Belvedere and Queen Elizabeth Walled Garden at Dumfries House in Scotland
