= St Nicholas' Church, Stillington =

Church in Stillington, North Yorkshire, England

Coordinates: 54.1031°N 1.1098°W

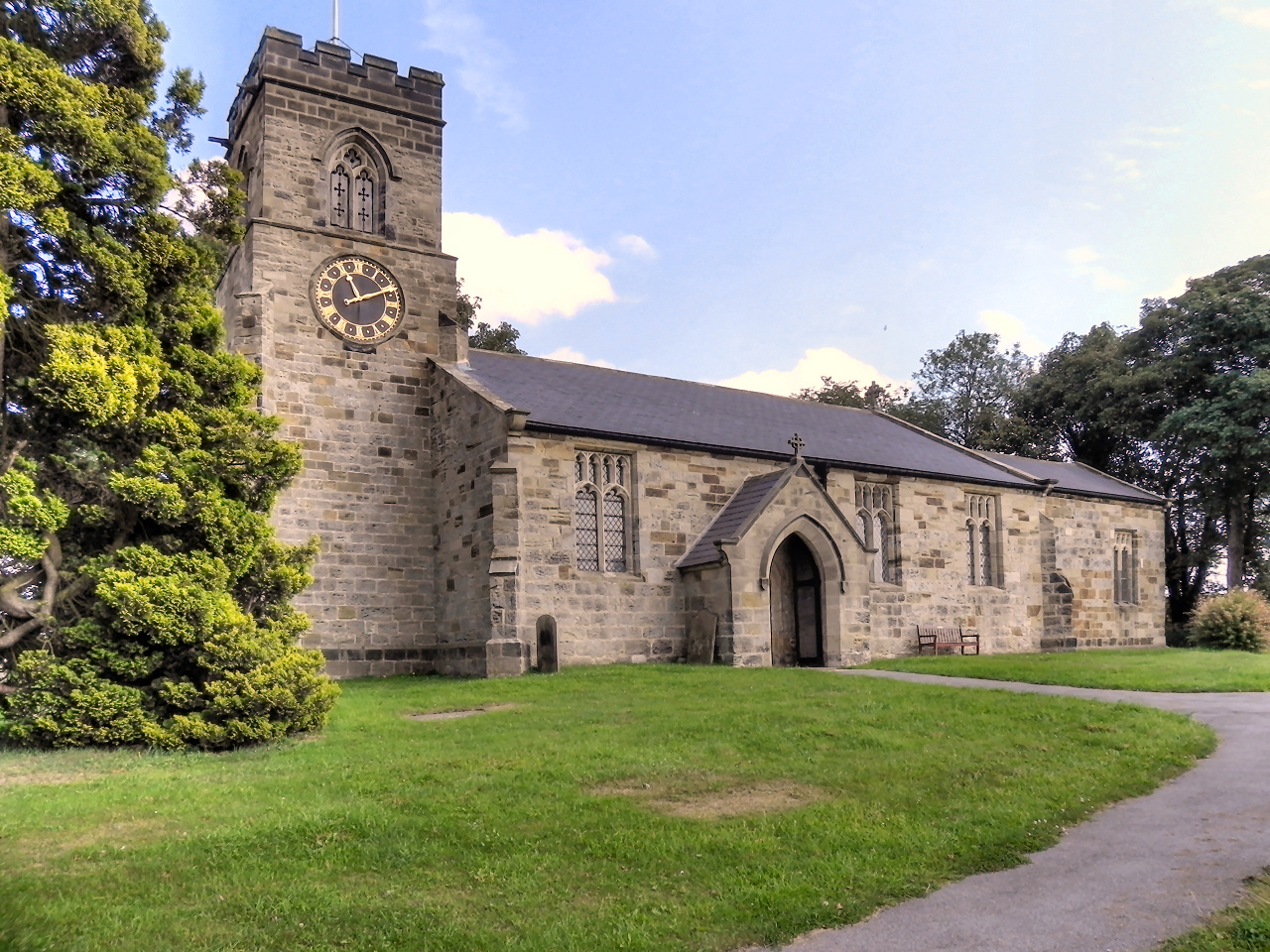
The church, in 2011

St Nicholas' Church is the parish church of Stillington, North Yorkshire, a village in England.

The church was built in the 15th century, from which period the chancel and north vestry survive. The remainder of the church was rebuilt in 1840, although some of the original material was used. The building was grade II* listed in 1960.

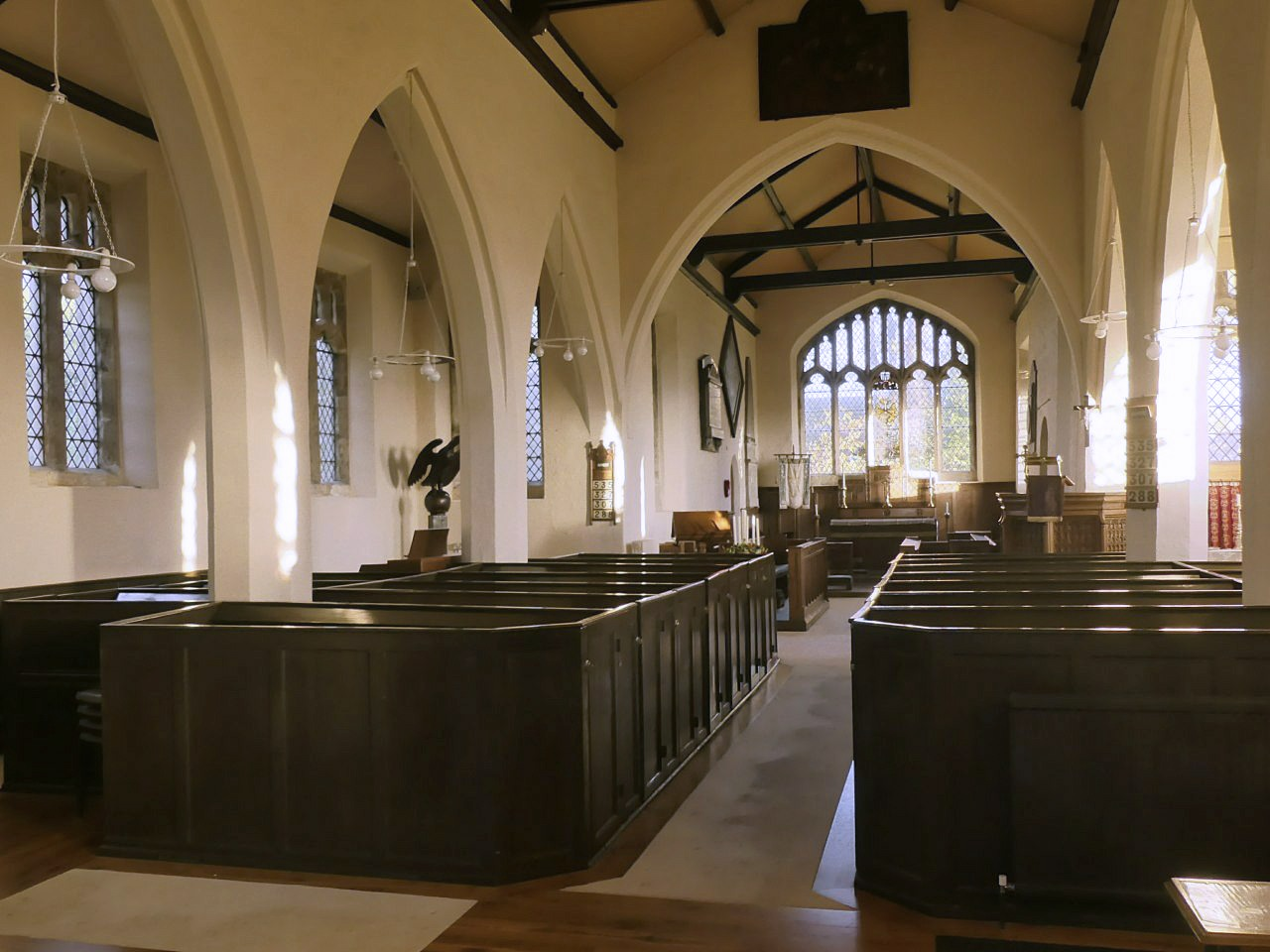
The nave and chancel

The church is built of stone with a Welsh slate roof, and consists of a nave, north and south aisles, a south porch, a chancel and a west tower. The tower has two stages, a south clock face, a string course, two-light bell openings, and an embattled parapet. The east window is in Perpendicular style, with a four-centred arched head and five lights, and it contains a small piece of Mediaeval glass. Inside are 19th-century box pews.

== See also ==
- Grade II* listed churches in North Yorkshire (district)
- Listed buildings in Stillington, North Yorkshire
