= St John's Church, Easingwold =

Catholic parish church in Easingwold, North Yorkshire, England

Coordinates: 54°07′07″N 1°11′32″W

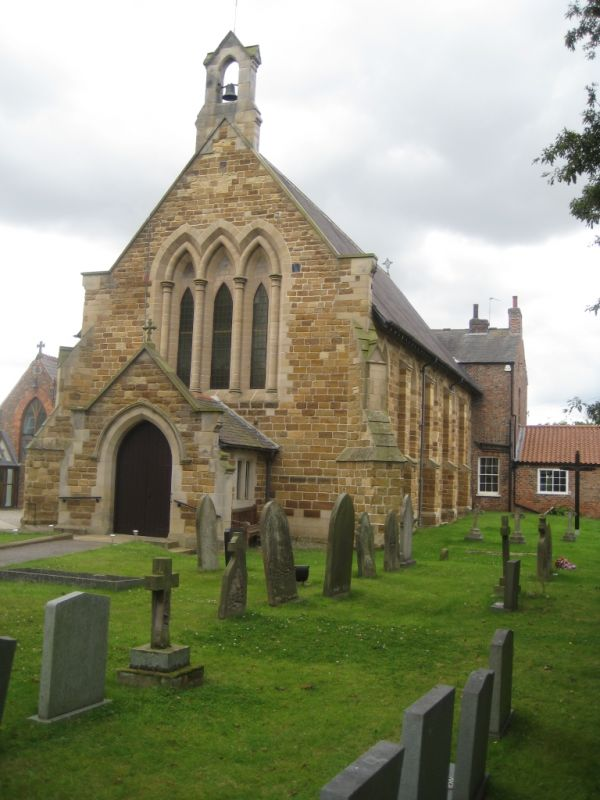
The church, in 2016

St John's Church is a Catholic parish church in Easingwold, a town in North Yorkshire, in England.

Catholic missions were established at Crayke and Oulston in the early 19th century, but in 1827 both were closed, and a new mission established in Easingwold. A presbytery was built in 1830, and a church was completed in 1833. It was designed by Joseph Hansom, and is his earliest known work. In 1870, the church was altered as a school was built adjoining it, to a design by Hadfield & Sons. At the same time, a new altar was installed, to a design by Joseph Stanislaus Hansom. In the 1880s, the building was heightened and the roof rebuilt, and a porch was added. The church was grade II listed in 1994. The building was restored in 2015, with a lady chapel being added, a new stone altar installed, and the gallery reduced in size.

The church is built of stone with a slate roof. It consists of a single cell with a west porch, and is in the Gothic Revival style. The porch has buttresses, and a coped gable with kneelers and a cross finial. The doorway has a pointed arch with a chamfered surround and a hood mould. On the west gable is a bellcote with a pointed arch, and the windows are lancets. Inside the church is a wooden west gallery, a wooden panelled roof, and late 19th century pews which were installed in 1934.

== See also ==
- Listed buildings in Easingwold
