= John Croft (wine merchant) =

English wine merchant and antiquarian (1732–1820)

John Croft (1732–1820) was an English wine merchant in York and Porto. He was known also for antiquarian and literary interests, and as an eccentric.

== Life ==
He was the fifth son of Stephen Croft (1683–1733) and his wife Elizabeth Anderson, daughter of Sir Edmund Anderson, 4th Baronet, born at Stillington, North Yorkshire. He went to Porto and took part in the wine trade, where there were Croft family connections. Another John Croft, a first cousin, had joined the British firm there in 1736, which then traded as Tilden, Thompson & Croft.

After a period in Porto, Croft returned to York, where he worked as a partner in the wine merchants Messrs George Suttrell & Co. He gained the freedom of the city of York in 1770, and in 1773 was one of its sheriffs. He became a well-known, eccentrically dressed local character, with the nickname "Scrapeana" from one of his works. He died at home on 18 November 1820, and was buried in York Minster on 24 November.

== Works ==
Croft published:

- A Treatise on the Wines of Portugal; also a Dissertation on the Nature and Use of Wines in general imported into Great Britain, York 1787, 2nd edition 1788. It was dedicated to William Constable (1721–1791) of Burton Constable Hall.
- A Small Collection of the Beauties of Shakspeare, followed by Annotations on Plays of Shakespear (Johnson and Steevens's edition), York, 1810.
- Scrapeana, Fugitive Miscellany, Sans Souci, 1792, jests and anecdotes. Dedicated to Józef Boruwłaski.
- Excerpta Antiqua; or a Collection of Original Manuscripts, 1797.
- Rules at the Game of Chess, 1808, anonymous.
- Memoirs of Harry Rowe the showman, who died in 1799. This was a charity publication, in support of York Dispensary.

Scrapeana contained an anecdote about Elizabeth Sterne, wife of Laurence Sterne. Stephen Croft of Stillington (1713–1798) was a friend of Sterne, and John Croft's brother. In 1795, John Croft sent a collection of anecdotes about Sterne to Caleb Whitefoord; and they were later published by William Hewins. They constitute what has been called "an inimical character sketch".

== Family ==
Croft married in 1774 Judith Bacon, daughter of Francis Bacon, alderman of York, and his second wife, Catherine Hildrop. There were two sons.
