= Alne Hall =

House in Alne, North Yorkshire, England

Coordinates: 54.0801°N 1.2419°W

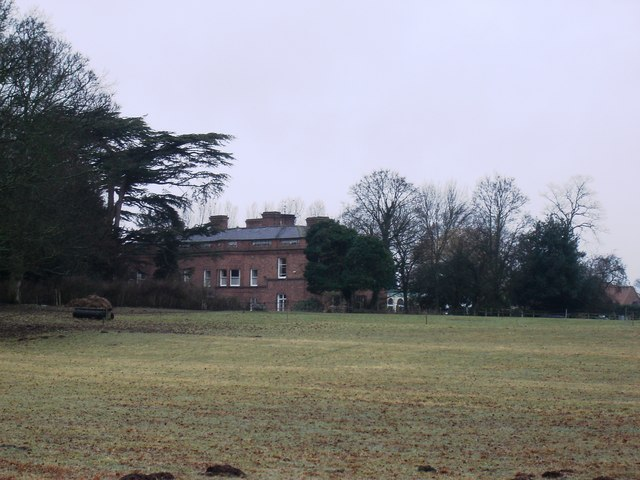
The hall, in 2009

Alne Hall is a historic building in Alne, North Yorkshire, in England.

In the medieval period, Alne Hall was the country residence of the treasurers of York Minster. The living of the village was appropriated to the treasurers in 1131, while the hall was first recorded in 1301, and an inventory of its contents survives from 1508. The office of treasurer ended during the English Civil War, and the building was sold to the Bethell family. They received a licence to hold nonconformist meetings at the house. The rear range of the house appears to survive from this period, while the front range was rebuilt in the late 19th century, when it was owned by John Swainston-Strangwayes. During World War II, the hall was a base for the Women's Land Army. It later became a Leonard Cheshire Disability home. By 2005, the hall had 28 residents, but it was put forward for closure, due to difficulties in renovating it to contemporary standards. These were overcome, the home remained open, and it was sold to Valorum Care in 2019.

The staircase hall in the rear range is the oldest surviving part of the building, and is timber framed. The remainder of the building is built of brick and has a slate roof. The entrance and rear front are six bays wide, and it is three bays deep. It is two storeys throughout, although the rear range was originally three storeys and has been altered. There are a wide range of windows, many of which are sashes, and the east and entrance fronts have full-height bow windows. Inside, there is an 18th-century staircase, which was probably inserted in the 19th century. The house was Grade II listed in 1952.

== See also ==
- Listed buildings in Alne, North Yorkshire
