= Stillington, North Yorkshire =

Village and civil parish in North Yorkshire, England

Coordinates: 54°06′10″N 1°06′30″W

Stillington
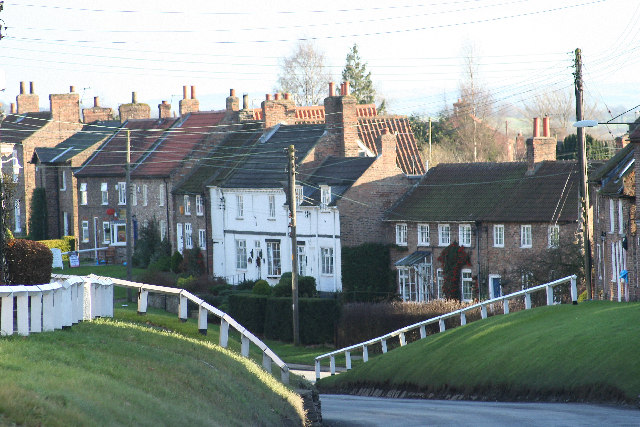
- Stillington village

- Location within North Yorkshire
- Population: 782 (2011 census)
- OS grid reference: SE584678
- Civil parish: Stillington
- Unitary authority: North Yorkshire
- Ceremonial county: North Yorkshire
- Region: Yorkshire and the Humber
- Country: England
- Sovereign state: United Kingdom
- Post town: YORK
- Postcode district: YO61
- Police: North Yorkshire
- Fire: North Yorkshire
- Ambulance: Yorkshire
- UK Parliament: Thirsk and Malton

Stillington is a village and civil parish in the county of North Yorkshire, England. It lies on the York to Helmsley road about 10 miles (16 km) north of York. Stillington Mill was the endpoint of the Foss Navigation Act 1793.

== History ==
The village is mentioned in the Domesday Book of 1086 as Stivelincton in the Bulford hundred. The lordship of the manor was in the possession of the Archbishop of York St Peter at the time of the Norman Conquest in 1066, and remained so afterwards. The church continued to hold the land until 1616, when it was leased to a William Ramsden. The lease was then granted to Christopher Croft in 1625. During the first year of the Commonwealth of England, many church lands were put up for sale and Croft purchased the manor outright. Following the Restoration, Christopher Croft, son of the former, sought a grant from the church for the manor when many church lands were being reclaimed. He was Lord Mayor of York at the time and was knighted soon after. The Croft family held the manor until 1895 when it was sold.

The name is derived from the name of a local Saxon settler, Styfel, and the Old English word tun, meaning farm. Therefore, as a whole it means Styfel's farm.

== Governance ==
The village lies within the Thirsk and Malton UK Parliament constituency. From 1974 to 2023 it was part of the Hambleton District, it is now administered by the unitary North Yorkshire Council. An electoral ward in the same name exists. This ward stretches north to Yearsley with a total population of 1,919 taken at the 2011 Census.

The local Parish Council has seven members that are re-elected every four years.

In 2025, the local Parish Council announced plans to remove two geese from the local Townend Pond, citing concerns over the risk that the birds "which stray onto the road, could cause an accident and injury to themselves or the public". In response, over 2,000 people signed a petition on Change.org to retain the geese and 60 members of the public attended the September 2025 Parish Council meeting to discuss a way forward to manage the situation.

== Geography ==
The nearest settlements are Farlington 1.9 miles (3.1 km) to the east, Huby 1.7 miles (2.7 km) to the south west, Crayke 2.1 miles (3.4 km) to the north west and Sutton-on-the-Forest 2 miles (3.2 km) to the south. It is also just 3.5 miles (5.6 km) from the market town of Easingwold. The River Foss flows southwards just outside the eastern end of the village. The B1363 road between York and Oswaldkirk runs north–south through the village following the old Turnpike set up in 1768.

=== Demography ===
In 1881 the population was recorded as being 600. The 2001 UK Census recorded the population as 741 in 326 households. The population was made of 50.2% males and 49.8% females, of which, 613 (82.7%) were over the age of sixteen years. There were 340 dwellings of which 155 were detached. The population of the village increased to 782 at the 2011 Census.

== Amenities ==
=== Economy ===
The area around the village is farmland and much of the local business is still involved in this. There are some small local enterprises. The Post Office is run by the local community. There are two public houses, with the other former pub now being a food establishment.

=== Education ===
A National School was built on The Green in 1821 on the site of the current village hall. The present Primary School built in 1907 is located on Main Street and is within the catchment area of Easingwold School for secondary education.

=== Sports ===
Stillington Sports and Social Club was founded in 1959 when the joint committees of the existing Cricket and Football Clubs purchased six acres of land from the Church Commissioners. Cricket has been played at Stillington since the 1840s, in The Park by permission of the Croft Family. The club joined the York and District League in the 1880s. Football has been played at Stillington since 1899. The Tennis Club was founded in 1976. A Bowling Green was created in 1978, with a club house added in 1997 with a Lottery grant. Two Squash courts were built in 1983. The hockey club, founded 1979, has recently disbanded.

== Religion ==
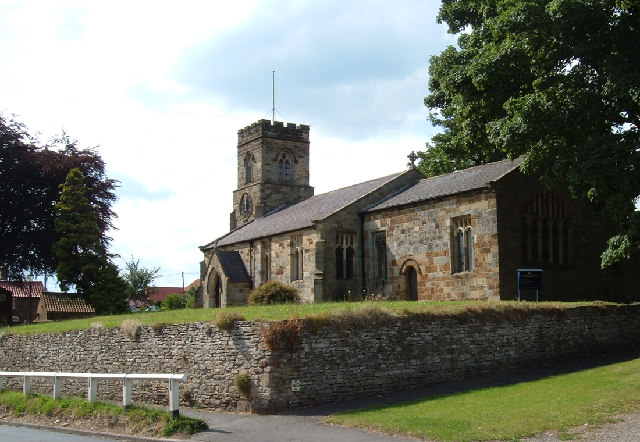
St Nicholas' Church

St Nicholas' Church, Stillington is the Anglican parish church. The current Grade II Listed building dates from the late 15th century, but has been subject to rebuilding. There are records of an earlier 12th-century structure.

The Primitive Methodists used to have a chapel in the village. A Wesleyan Chapel was built in 1844, but has been replaced by a modern structure in 1971.

== Notable residents ==
- John Croft (1732–1820), born in Stillington.
- Laurence Sterne - vicar of Stillington 1745–1768. Author of The Life and Opinions of Tristram Shandy, Gentleman.

== See also ==
- Listed buildings in Stillington, North Yorkshire
