= Listed buildings in Alne, North Yorkshire =

Alne is a civil parish in the county of North Yorkshire, England. It contains nine listed buildings that are recorded in the National Heritage List for England. Of these, one is listed at Grade I, the highest of the three grades, and the others are at Grade II, the lowest grade. The parish contains the village of Alne and the surrounding countryside. Most of the listed buildings are houses, cottages and associated structures, farmhouses and farm buildings, and the others consist of a church, a plague stone and a maltings.

== Key ==
Grade	Criteria
I	Buildings of exceptional interest, sometimes considered to be internationally important
II	Buildings of national importance and special interest

== Buildings ==
Name and location	Photograph	Date	Notes	Grade
St Mary's Church; 54.08157°N 1.24472°W		12th century	The church has been altered and extended through the centuries, including remodelling and raising the tower in 1766. It is built mainly in sandstone, and consists of a nave, a chancel with a north chapel, and a west tower. The lower part of the tower is in stone, and the upper part in brick, with quoins, round-arched windows and bell openings, a diamond-shaped clock face, and a plain parapet with corner pinnacles. The main south doorway is highly decorated, with two orders of shafts, carved abaci, and a round arch with two orders, the inner order of medallions and the outer order of lunettes, all intricately carved. The priest's doorway in the chancel has a lintel carved with a twining serpent between two eagles, above which is a corbel table.	I
The White House; 54.08328°N 1.24227°W	—	16th century	The house has a timber framed core, it is enclosed in whitewashed brick, and has a Welsh slate roof. There are two storeys and three bays. In the centre is a recessed entrance, and the windows are modern casements. Inside there is much exposed timber framing, and an inglenook fireplace.	II
Plague Cross; 54.07739°N 1.24625°W		1604 (possible)	The cross base is in stone, consisting of an octagonal shaft on a low chamfered plinth. On it is a later milestone inscription, and by it is a stone trough.	II
Alne Hall; 54.08013°N 1.24184°W		17th century	A large house with a timber framed core, later extended, encased in brick, and subsequently used for other purposes. It has a brick modillion cornice, a stone floor band and a parapet with balusters, and a slate roof. There are two storeys, and an east front of three bays, with a full-height bow window. The entrance front has six bays and contains two full-height bow windows. The other windows are a mix of sashes and casements. At the rear is a range of whitewashed brick with a stone slate roof, and a coped gable and kneelers at the east end. Inside, there is exposed timber framing.	II
Whitwell House; 54.08313°N 1.24307°W	—	Mid 18th century	The house, which was later extended, is in pale reddish-brown brick, with a floor band, dentilled eaves and a swept pantile roof. There are two storeys and four bays. On the front is a doorway with a pediment, and the windows are modern casements.	II
Forest Hall Farmhouse; 54.09565°N 1.21425°W	—	Mid to late 18th century	A farmhouse and cottage, later combined, in reddish-brown brick with a floor band and a pantile roof with rendered raised verges and kneelers. There are two storeys and three bays. On the front are two doorways and segmental-arched sash windows, and at the rear the windows are horizontally-sliding sashes.	II
Evergreen Farmhouse and cartshed 54.08352°N 1.23931°W	—	Late 18th century	The farmhouse is in pale reddish-brown brick, with stepped and dentilled eaves and a tile roof. There are two storeys and two bays. In the centre is a wooden doorcase, and the windows are sashes in wooden architraves with painted lintels. The cartshed, lower to the left, has dentilled eaves and a pantile roof. It contains two barn windows, sash windows on the front, and three round arches at the rear.	II
Service building north of Alne Hall; 54.08051°N 1.24210°W	—	Early 19th century	Originally staff quarters and a coach house, they are in reddish-brown brick. The staff quarters has two storeys and three bays, and a hipped pantile roof. It contains three full-height recessed arches, a central doorway with an architrave and an oblong fanlight, and segmental-arched sash windows in architraves. The coach house has a single storey and a loft, two bays, and a Welsh slate roof. It has stepped eaves, and contains a coach entrance arch and segmental-arched windows.	II
The Maltings; 54.09058°N 1.23242°W	—	c. 1860	The maltings is in red brick with Welsh slate roofs. There are two storeys and two ranges. The openings include cross-casement windows, and external steps lead to a loading door in the upper floor. At the southwest is a projecting square barley sweating kiln with dentilled eaves, a hipped pyramidal roof with a ventilator cap, and a slate-hung dormer. To the right is a later lean-to engine shed.	II
