= Henry W. Rowe =

Henry Walker Rowe
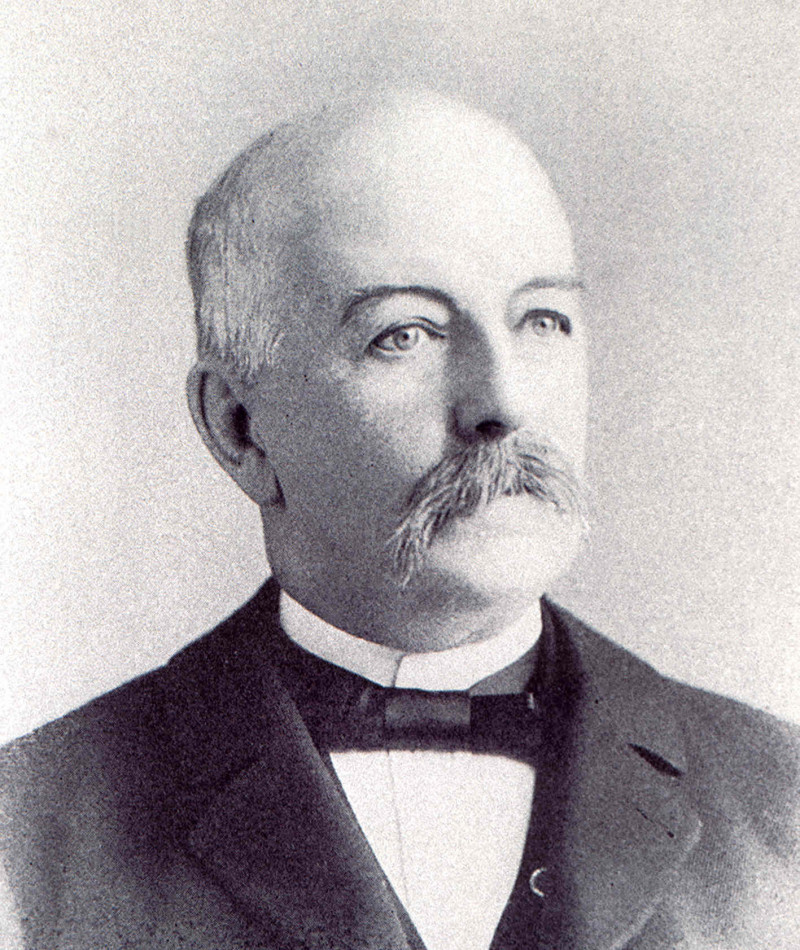
- Born: April 1, 1840; Candia, New Hampshire, US
- Died: October 9, 1913 (aged 73); Roxbury, Massachusetts, US
- Burial place: Hill Cemetery, Candia, New Hampshire
- Military career
- Allegiance: United States (Union)
- Branch: Army
- Service years: 1862–1865
- Rank: Private
- Units: Company I, 11th New Hampshire Infantry
- Conflicts: Petersburg, Virginia
- Awards: Medal of Honor

Henry Walker Rowe (April 1, 1840 – October 9, 1913) was a private in the United States Army who was awarded the Presidential Medal of Honor for gallantry during the American Civil War. Rowe was awarded the medal on December 1, 1864 for actions performed at the Second Battle of Petersburg in Virginia on June 17, 1864.

== Personal life ==
Rowe was born in Candia, New Hampshire, on April 1, 1840, the son of John and Lydia (Robie) Rowe. He married Sophronia J. Wallace and, later, Lavinia T. (Rowe) Rowe. After the war, he worked as a printer in Manchester, New Hampshire, and eventually moved his business to Dayton, Ohio, and Boston, Massachusetts. He fathered one son, Harry Sherman Rowe with his second wife in 1874. He died in Roxbury, Massachusetts, on October 9, 1913.

== Military service ==
Rowe enlisted in the Army on August 14, 1862, and was mustered into Company I of the 11th New Hampshire Infantry on September 2, 1862. On June 15, 1864, while on the front lines at the Battle of Petersburg, the 11th was ordered to run through a ravine and break the Confederate lines. After a 24 hour march and an initial failed attack at 6 PM, an ambush at 3 AM overran Confederate lines and allowed Rowe and two other men to capture 27 Confederates manning a battery and their flags.

Rowe's Medal of Honor citation reads:

The President of the United States of America, in the name of Congress, takes pleasure in presenting the Medal of Honor to Private Henry Walker Rowe, United States Army, for extraordinary heroism on 17 June 1864, while serving with Company I, 11th New Hampshire Infantry, in action at Petersburg, Virginia. With two companions, Private Rowe rushed and disarmed 27 enemy pickets, capturing a stand of flags.

— E. M. Stanton, Secretary of War

Rowe was wounded in the shoulder during a mine explosion at Petersburg on June 30, 1864, and was moved to Douglas Hospital in Washington D.C. before being mustered out of service on June 14, 1865.
