= Longley House =

House in Easingwold, North Yorkshire, England

Coordinates: 54.1203°N 1.1945°W

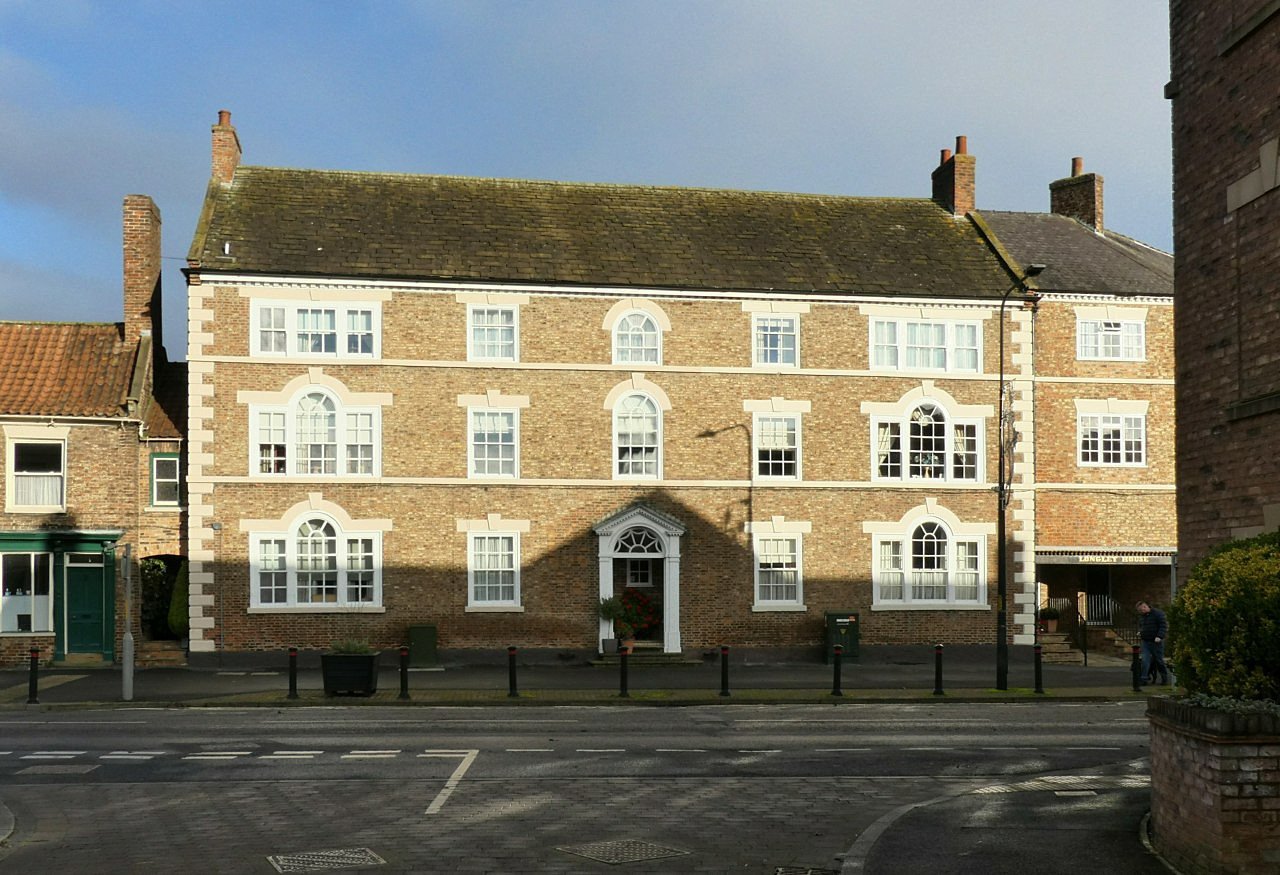
The building, in 2022

Longley House is a historic building in Easingwold, a town in North Yorkshire in England.

The building was constructed in the mid 18th century as the Rose and Crown coaching inn. It had about 50 horses stabled behind the inn, mostly for use for the post business. The inn closed in the 19th century, and the building became a girls' boarding school. It was later converted into housing. The building was grade II listed in 1960.

The building is constructed of pale brown brick with stucco dressings, quoins, sill bands, and a stone slate roof with stone coping and kneelers. In the centre is a doorway with pilasters, a patterned radial fanlight, and an open dentilled pediment, and the windows are sashes with architraves. Above the doorway they have round-arched heads, the two lower floors in the outer bays contain Venetian windows, in the top floor above they are tripartite, and the other windows have flat heads; all the windows have stucco lintels with keystones.

== See also ==
- Listed buildings in Easingwold
