= Harry Rowe (showman) =

Harry Rowe (c. 1726–1799) was an English showman and puppeteer, now remembered as a satirical "emendator of Shakespeare" for a work that appeared under his name.

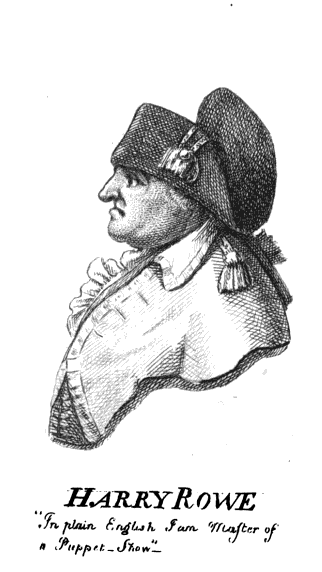
Harry Rowe.

== Life ==
Rowe was born at York. He served as trumpeter to the Duke of Kingston's light horse, and was present at the battle of Culloden in 1746, after which he attended the high sheriffs of Yorkshire in the capacity of trumpeter to the assizes, for 40 years. He was an itinerant puppet showman, travelling in Scotland and the north of England, and he operated a summer theatre in York for many years.

== Works ==
John Croft, a wine merchant of York, got up a subscription for Rowe, and caused to be printed for his benefit Macbeth, with Notes by Harry Rowe, York, printed for the Annotator (1797, second edition, with a portrait of Rowe, 1799). The so-called "emendations" were intended to raise a laugh at the expense of scholarly commentators.

In 1797 also appeared, in Rowe's name, No Cure No Pay; or the Pharmacopolist, a musical farce, York, in which sarcasm is levelled against empirics with diplomas, who are represented by Drs. Wax, Potion, and Motion, and the journeyman Marrowbone. Annotations were again furnished by "a friend", probably Croft.

Shortly after Rowe's death in York poorhouse, Croft issued Memoirs of Harry Rowe, constructed from materials found in an old box after his decease, with profits to the York Dispensary. A copy of Rowe's Macbeth in the Boston Public Library contained some manuscript notes by its former owner Isaac Reed including an erroneous ascription of the annotations to Andrew Hunter.
