= Tollerton, North Yorkshire =

Village and civil parish in North Yorkshire, England

Coordinates: 54.07058°N 1.21772°W

Tollerton
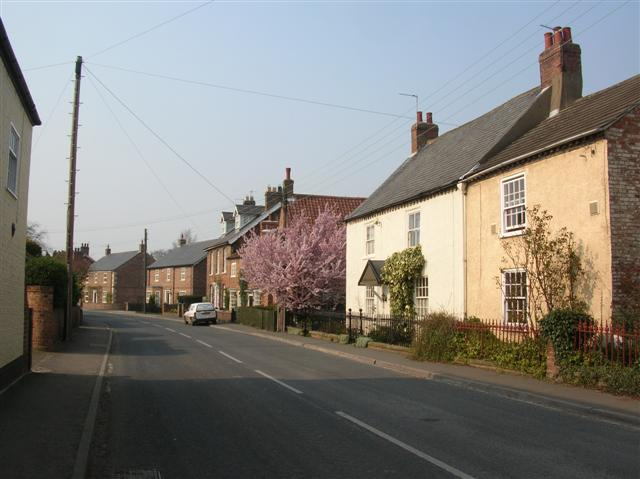
- Village street in Tollerton

- Location within North Yorkshire
- Population: 1,026 (2011 census)
- OS grid reference: SE512641
- Civil parish: Tollerton
- Unitary authority: North Yorkshire
- Ceremonial county: North Yorkshire
- Region: Yorkshire and the Humber
- Country: England
- Sovereign state: United Kingdom
- Post town: YORK
- Postcode district: YO61
- Dialling code: 01347
- Police: North Yorkshire
- Fire: North Yorkshire
- Ambulance: Yorkshire
- UK Parliament: Thirsk and Malton

Tollerton is a village and civil parish in North Yorkshire, England. Tollerton is situated close to both the A19 and the River Kyle about 4 miles (6 km) south of Easingwold and 10 miles (16 km) north of York.

== History ==
The name Tollerton derives from the Old English tolneretūn meaning 'tax gatherer's settlement'.

No date for the establishment of a settlement at Tollerton has been determined but it was part of the old royal Forest of Galtres until 1630. Tollerton is mentioned in the Domesday Book as Tolentun in the ancient wapentake of Bulford in the North Riding and was owned by the church of St Peter in York. In the 12th century, the wapentake was renamed as the wapentake of Bulmer. From 1974 to 2023 it was part of the Hambleton District, it is now administered by the unitary North Yorkshire Council.

Until the latter half of the 20th century, the village had a railway halt, which was closed in November 1965.

== Geography ==
The village is adjacent to the East Coast Main Line railway but the nearest stations are York or Thirsk. It lies just over 1 mile (1.6 km) from the A19. The River Kyle flows to the south west of the village.

== Demography ==
According to the 2001 UK Census, there were 824 people in 317 households across the Tollerton Parish. Of those households, 269 were owner occupied with 188 being detached dwellings. Of the total population, 637 were over 16 years of age of which 432 were actively employed.

By the time of the 2011 UK Census, the parish had grown to 1,026 residents across 395 dwellings. In 2015, North Yorkshire County Council estimated the population of the parish to have risen again to 1,070.

== Religion ==
There is a church, dedicated to St Michael, that was completed in June 1955. The dedication ceremony was conducted by the then Bishop of Selby, Carey Knyvett.

== Village amenities ==
There is a public house, the Black Horse, which hosts an annual Mini Horticultural Show on the first Sunday in September. On the east side of the railway line is a caravan park next to the Station Inn Restaurant and pub. The Tollerton Stores shop won the Hambleton District award for Best Village Store in 2010. There is a village hall and a sports ground. The village hall was built as a war memorial rather than having a more traditional cross or column. It was completed in January 1921 with a dedication service held on 31 January 1921. Tollerton Tennis Club plays competitively in the York & District and Hovingham Leagues.

Since 1256 when Henry II granted the Treasurer of York a charter, there have been weekly and annual fairs and markets until very recently.

== See also ==
- Listed buildings in Tollerton, North Yorkshire
