= Flawith =

Village and civil parish in North Yorkshire, England

Coordinates: 54.082270°N 1.264110°W

- Location within North Yorkshire
- OS grid reference: SE482654
- Civil parish: Flawith
- Unitary authority: North Yorkshire
- Ceremonial county: North Yorkshire
- Region: Yorkshire and the Humber
- Country: England
- Sovereign state: United Kingdom
- Post town: YORK
- Postcode district: YO61
- Police: North Yorkshire
- Fire: North Yorkshire
- Ambulance: Yorkshire

Flawith is a village and civil parish in the county of North Yorkshire, England. It is situated approximately 4 miles (6.4 km) south-west of Easingwold. The population taken at the 2011 Census was less than 100. Details are included in the civil parish of Aldwark.

From 1974 to 2023 it was part of the Hambleton District, it is now administered by the unitary North Yorkshire Council.

The origin of the place-name is not clear. One explanation is that it comes from the Old Norse words flagth and vath meaning ford of the female troll or witch. Alternatively it might come from the Old Norse flatha meaning flat meadow or from the Old English fleathe meaning water-lily. The place-name appears as Flathwayth in c. 1190.

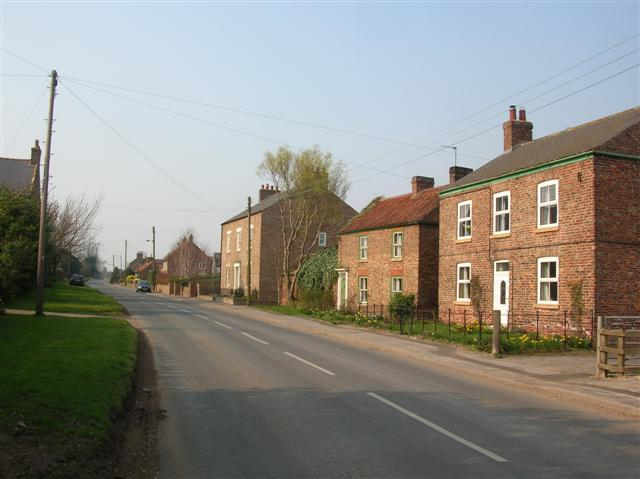
Main street in Flawith
