= Easingwold =

Market town and civil parish in North Yorkshire, England

Coordinates: 54°07′17″N 1°11′32″W

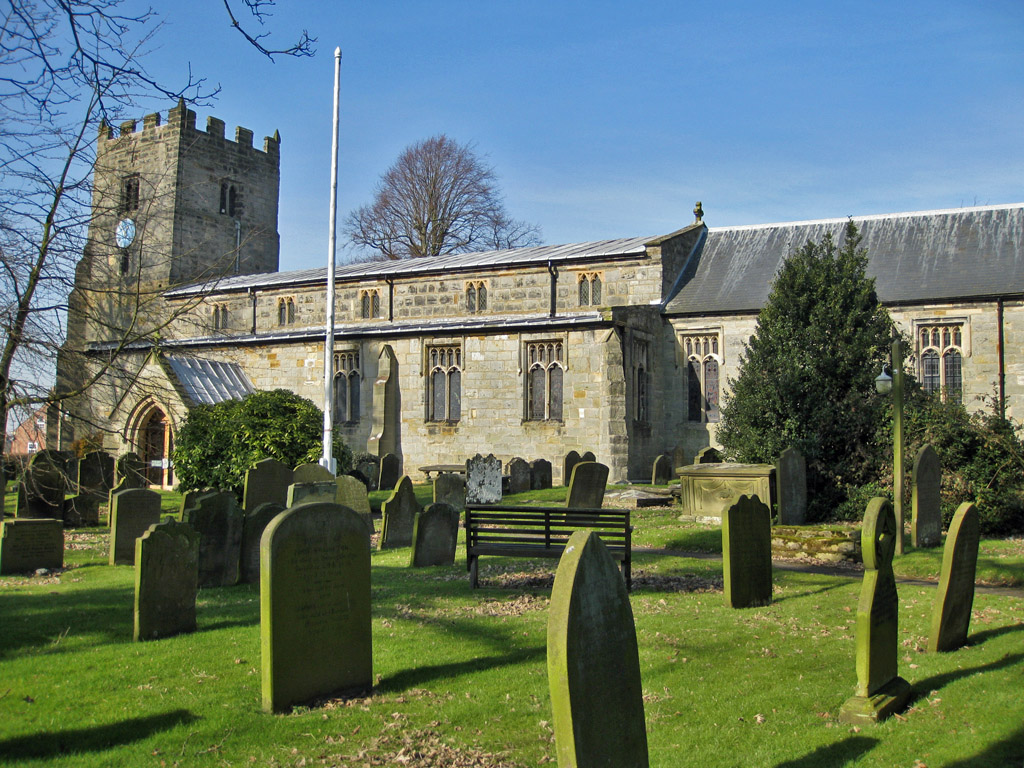
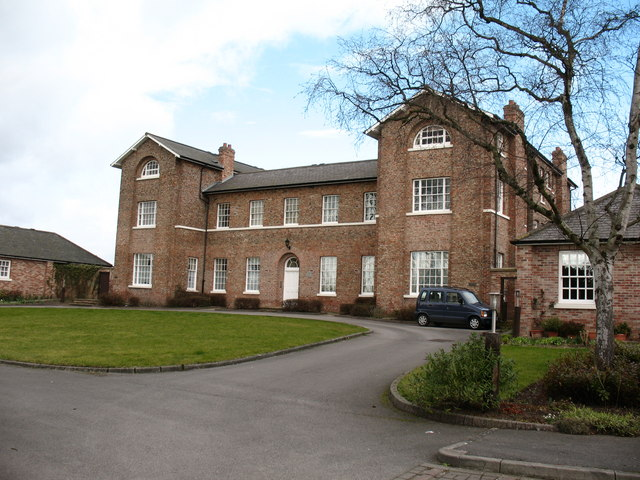
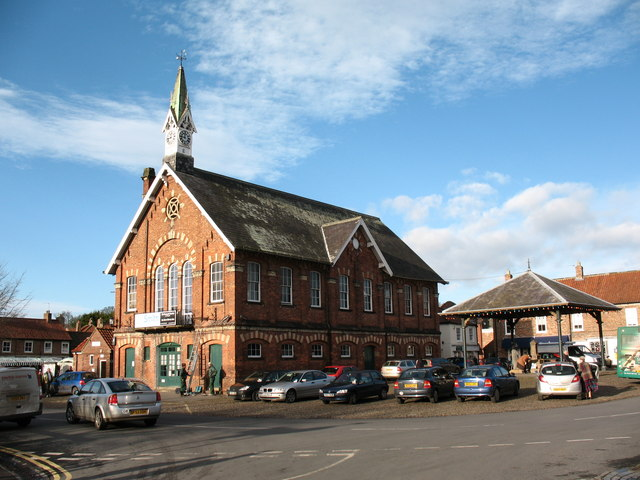
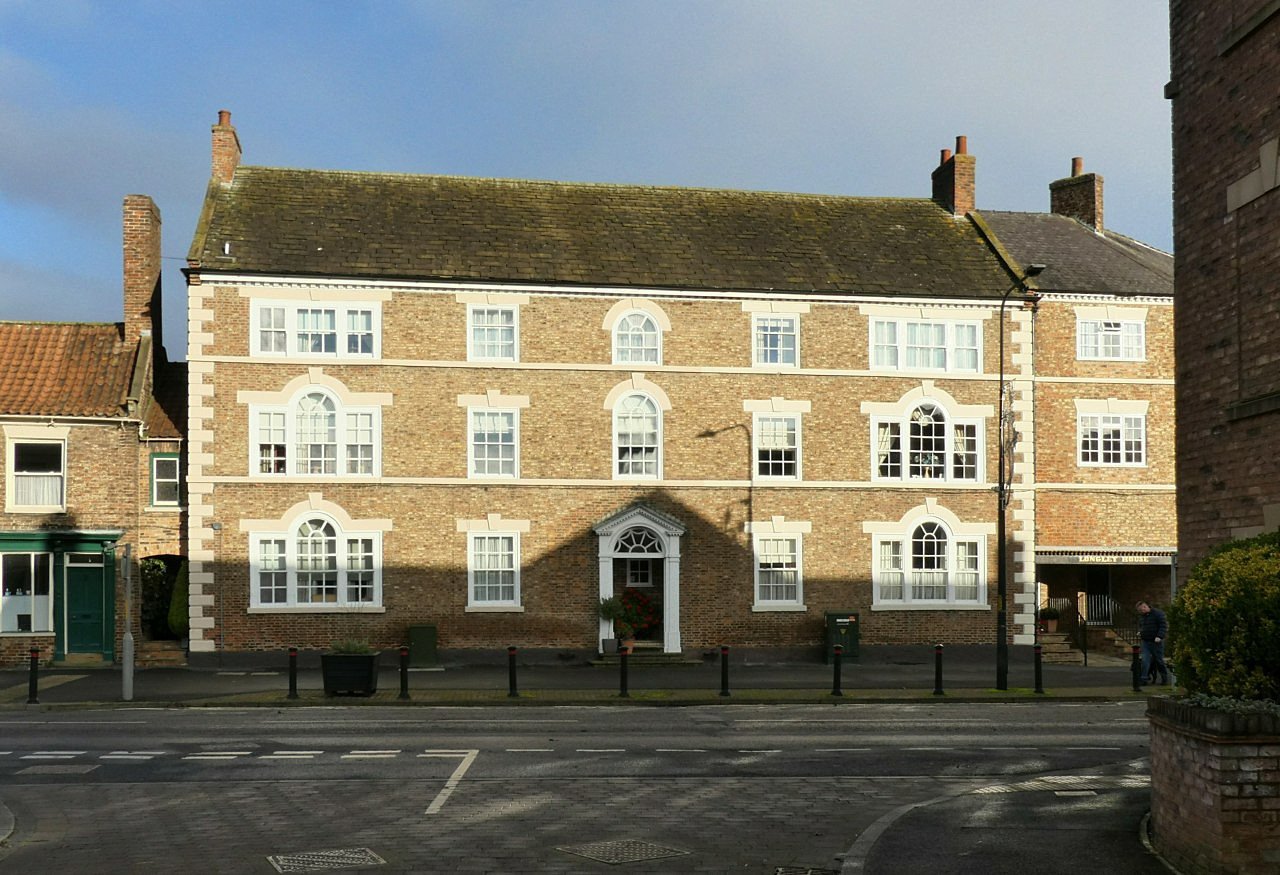
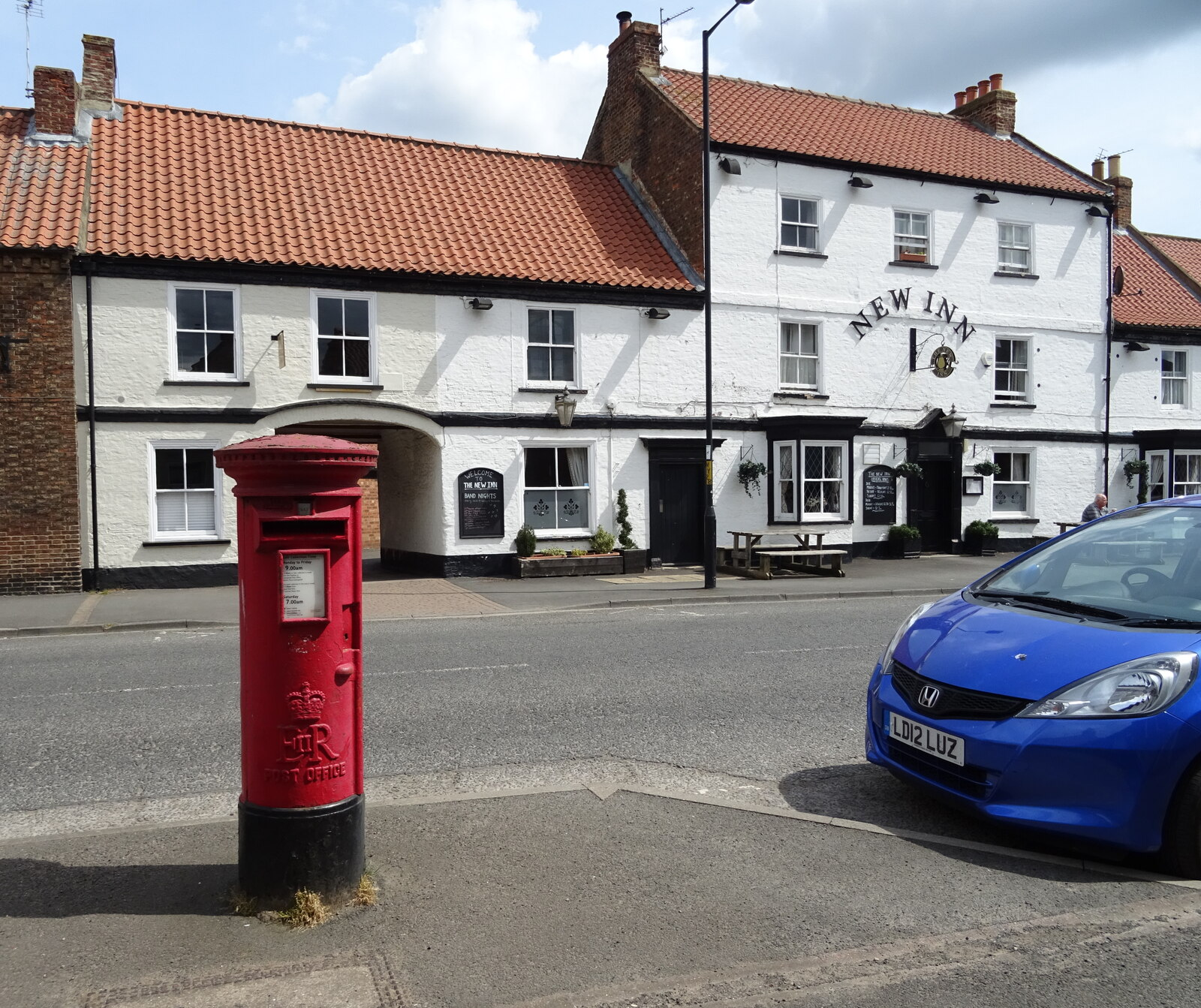
- St John’s Church Union Workhouse The Town Hall & Market Cross Longley House New Inn

- Location within North Yorkshire
- Population: 4,627 (2011 census)
- OS grid reference: SE529696
  - London: 185 mi (298 km) S
- Civil parish: Easingwold
- Unitary authority: North Yorkshire
- Ceremonial county: North Yorkshire
- Region: Yorkshire and the Humber
- Country: England
- Sovereign state: United Kingdom
- Post town: YORK
- Postcode district: YO61
- Dialling code: 01347
- Police: North Yorkshire
- Fire: North Yorkshire
- Ambulance: Yorkshire
- UK Parliament: Wetherby and Easingwold

Easingwold is a market town and civil parish in North Yorkshire, England. Historically part of the North Riding of Yorkshire, it had a population of 4,233 at the 2001 census, increasing to 4,627 at the 2011 Census. It is located about 12 miles (19 km) north of York, near the foot of the Howardian Hills.

== History ==
The town is mentioned in the Domesday Book of 1086 as "Eisicewalt" in the Bulford hundred. At the time of the Norman conquest, the manor was owned by Earl Morcar, but subsequently passed to the King. In 1265 the manor was passed to Edmund Crouchback by his father, Henry III. The manor was caught up in the dispute between the 2nd Earl of Lancaster and Edward I and the manor passed back to the crown following the Battle of Boroughbridge in 1322 which resulted in the execution of the Earl at Pontefract. The manor was restored to the Earl's brother some six years later, but he left no male heir, so the lands passed to his son-in-law, John of Gaunt in 1361. The lands were next granted to his son-in-law, Ralph Neville. Following the War of the Roses, the lands were declared forfeit to the Crown until 1633, when they were granted to Thomas Belasyse and subsequently became the possession of the Wombwell family.

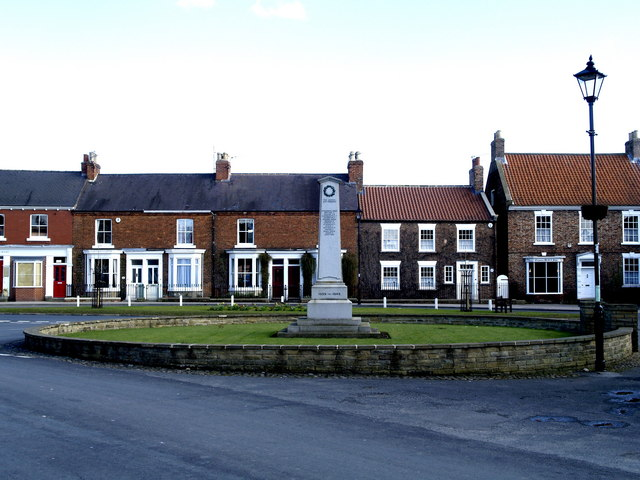
Easingwold's cenotaph

The town is an amalgamation of two smaller villages, Uppleby and Lessimers. The former being a settlement, or -by of a Dane called Upple, and the latter being an Angle settlement on the lease-mires, meaning leased land frequently waterlogged.

The name of Easingwold is Anglo Saxon in origin, with wold being a derivation of wald meaning forest, and the former part being a Saxon family name, possibly Esa. King John had a hunting lodge there and the royal Forest of Galtres once surrounded the area.

The market place was the site of an old toll booth. The base of the old market cross still exists next to Easingwold Town Hall, which was built as a public hall. It replaced an old row of 'shambles' where butchers sold their wares. The market place was also the site of a bullring used for baiting. Records show that markets have been held in the town since 1221, but were formalised under letters patent from Charles I.

In the 18th century, two coaching inns served the town: the New Inn, and the Rose and Crown.

Under the Poor Law Amendment Act 1834 a Poor law union was established in Easingwold in 1837. The town had a workhouse built in 1756 on Oulston Road. In 1934, Easingwold Union Workhouse was converted into a hospital for the mentally handicapped and known as Claypenny Colony until 1952 and then as Claypenny Hospital until the majority of the site was sold and redeveloped as residential accommodation towards the end of the 20th century.

In 1891 a privately owned branch line was opened from the town to the London-Edinburgh main line at Alne after many failed attempts to have the main line pass through or closer to the town. The line ran a passenger service until 1948 and a goods service until its final closure in 1957. The station was located in what is now Station Court. All that remains is the old station house following a fire in 1967 that resulted in its demolition.

There are 51 Grade II listed buildings in Easingwold, including five mileposts and the telephone kiosk in Back Lane. The areas of Long Street; the Parish Church and Church Hill; Uppleby and the market place are all within the Easingwold Conservation Area.

In 1908 Lieutenant-General Baden-Powell, the founder of the Scout Movement, visited Easingwold as commander of the Northumbrian division of the newly formed Territorial Force. Easingwold's Scout Group was founded two years later.

== Governance ==
The town is situated within the Wetherby and Easingwold UK Parliament constituency, created in 2024 following the 2023 Periodic Review of Westminster constituencies; it was previously in the Thirsk and Malton constituency. The town gives its name to the electoral division of North Yorkshire Council in which it resides. It was part of the former Hambleton District from 1974 to 2023.

The town has its own Town Council made of 11 councillors, with three attendees who are District Councillors.

== Geography ==
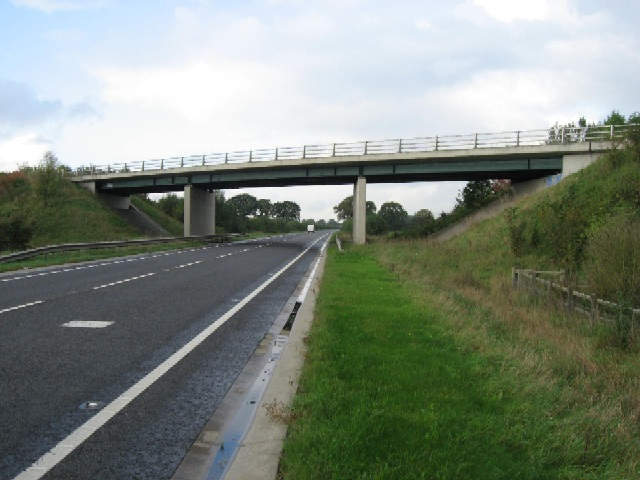
The A19 Bypass

The town was bypassed by the A19 in November 1994. The town is the focal point for many nearby villages and the nearest larger settlements are York 12 miles (19 km) to the south; Boroughbridge 8 miles (13 km) to the west; Thirsk 10 miles (16 km) to the northwest and Malton 16 miles (26 km) to the east. The highest point in the town is at the town's edge on the Oulston Road at 200 feet (60 m).

=== Demography ===
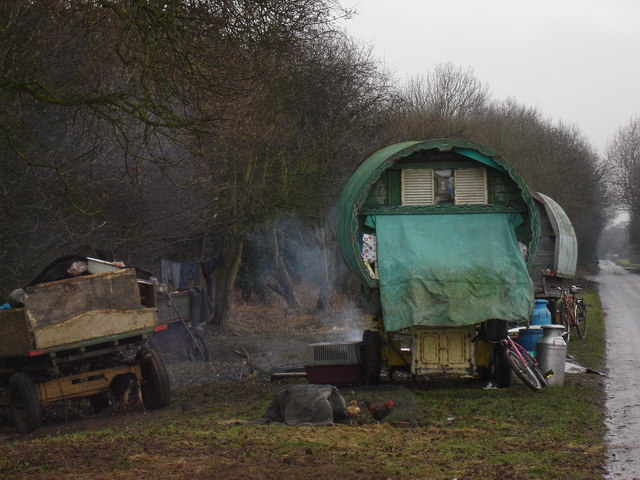
Romani travellers in Easingwold

According to the 1881 UK Census, the town had a population of 2,044. According to the 2001 UK Census the population was 4,233, of which 3,428 were over the age of sixteen. Of those, 1,843 were in employment. The 2011 Census showed the population as 4,627.

=== Parks ===
After the closure of the Claypenny Hospital, the land was developed into a housing estate with a 34-acre parkland in between called Millfields Park opened in 1999 and now run by the Woodland Trust. The park is bounded to the west by a hawthorn hedge, to the north by a stock proof fence and by the housing estate around the rest. There are a number of informal footpaths across the site as well as the Sustrans National Cycle Route 65. Among the tree species planted here are sessile oak, cherry, field maple, ash, birch, rowan, walnut, whitebeam and larch. Some of the shrub species found here are holly, hazel, hawthorn, blackthorn and dogrose. Supported by the council and local community, Millfields Park hosts the 5 km Millfield parkrun every Saturday at 9 am.

Towards the centre of the town is Memorial Park. The site was formerly occupied by private tenants, a tennis club and a garage. After several years of planning and delay, the park was opened in September 1955.

== Economy ==
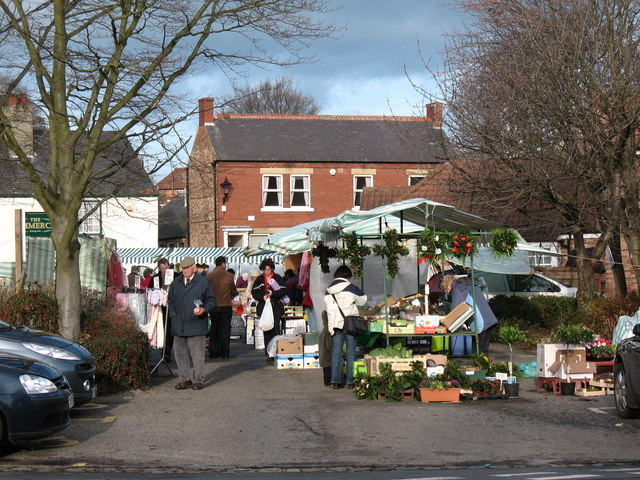
Market day in Easingwold

There are a number of local retail businesses in the town. The number of public houses has significantly reduced since the 19th century, when there were also a number of local brew houses, the names of which can still be seen on local houses.

Easingwold is served by bus services to nearby villages, towns and the city of York. This includes services formerly partly run by the local coach business, Stephenson's of Easingwold, now fully run by Reliance Motor Services.

The Cabinet Office have their Emergency Planning College at the Hawkhills, Easingwold.

The town also has its own local newspaper, the Easingwold Advertiser, which provides local news and interest pieces for the town and surrounding villages.

=== Public services ===
The police station on Church Avenue is only open on part-time basis on request. The fire station on Stillington Road is a retained station, which is staffed by crews of firefighters who provide on-call cover from home or their place of work. St Monica's Community Hospital is part of the York NHS Foundation and is located in Long Street. It has no Accident & Emergency facilities.

The former Hambleton District Council maintained local offices in Church Hill. The town has a public library situated in Tanpit Lane, just off the Market Place. The tourist information office for the area is located in Chapel Lane.

== Education ==
In 1781, a grammar school was founded in the town, which is now the site of Easingwold Community Primary School. A National School was built in 1862 in the town, but now houses the town library.

In 1954 a secondary school, Easingwold School, was built, and is now known as Outwood Academy Easingwold, with a pupil roll of around 1,000 pupils. Its catchment area includes Alne Primary, Crayke CE, Easingwold, Forest of Galtres Anglican/Methodist, Huby CE, Husthwaite CE, Linton on Ouse, Sheriff Hutton, Stillington and Sutton on the Forest CE Primary Schools.

== Media ==
Local news and television programmes are provided by BBC Yorkshire and BBC North East and Cumbria on BBC One and ITV Yorkshire and ITV Tyne Tees on ITV1. Television signals are received from either the Emley Moor or Bilsdale transmitters.

Local radio stations are BBC Radio York on 103.7 FM, Greatest Hits Radio Yorkshire (formerly Minster FM) on 104.7 FM, YO1 Radio on 102.8 FM and YorkMix Radio which broadcast from York on DAB.

The town is served by the local newspaper, the Easingwold Advertiser.

== Culture ==
Characters of servants in Downton Abbey refer to attending church in Easingwold. The historical drama also mentions nearby Thirsk and Ripon.

== Sports ==
Easingwold Town AFC was founded in 1892 and was a founder member of the York League. The team won the York FA Senior Cup in the 1971–72 season and has been a finalist on two other occasions. The Junior side won the York FA Junior Cup in the 1961–62 season and were finalists on one other occasion.

The Galtres Centre provides activities including badminton, tennis, netball and gymnastics, and contains an indoor shooting range operated by the local rifle and pistol club.

Easingwold Cricket Club play at Memorial Park on Back Lane, and in the York & District Senior League. To the south of the town is Easingwold Golf Club.

== Religion ==
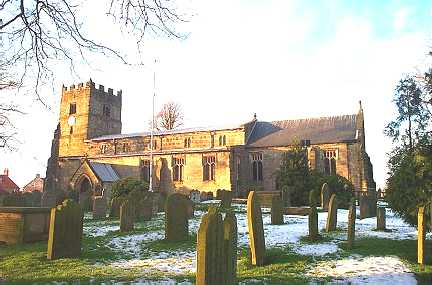
St John and All Saints' Church, Easingwold

A church in the town is dedicated to St John and All Saints. There has been a church here since Saxon times, though the present building dates from the 15th century.

St John's Church, Easingwold, the Catholic church on Long Street, was erected in 1833, and served by Benedictine Monks of Ampleforth Abbey. It was designed by Charles Hansom, the brother of Joseph Hansom who invented the Hansom cab. A school was attached to the church in 1871.

There has been a Wesleyan chapel in the town since 1786. The location has changed several times, with the second building being erected in 1815 with a school added in 1860, and finally finding a home in Chapel Street in 1975.

There was also a Primitive Methodist chapel in the town, built in 1870.

== See also ==
- Listed buildings in Easingwold
