= Ryan Swain (presenter) =

English radio presenter and DJ (born 1990)

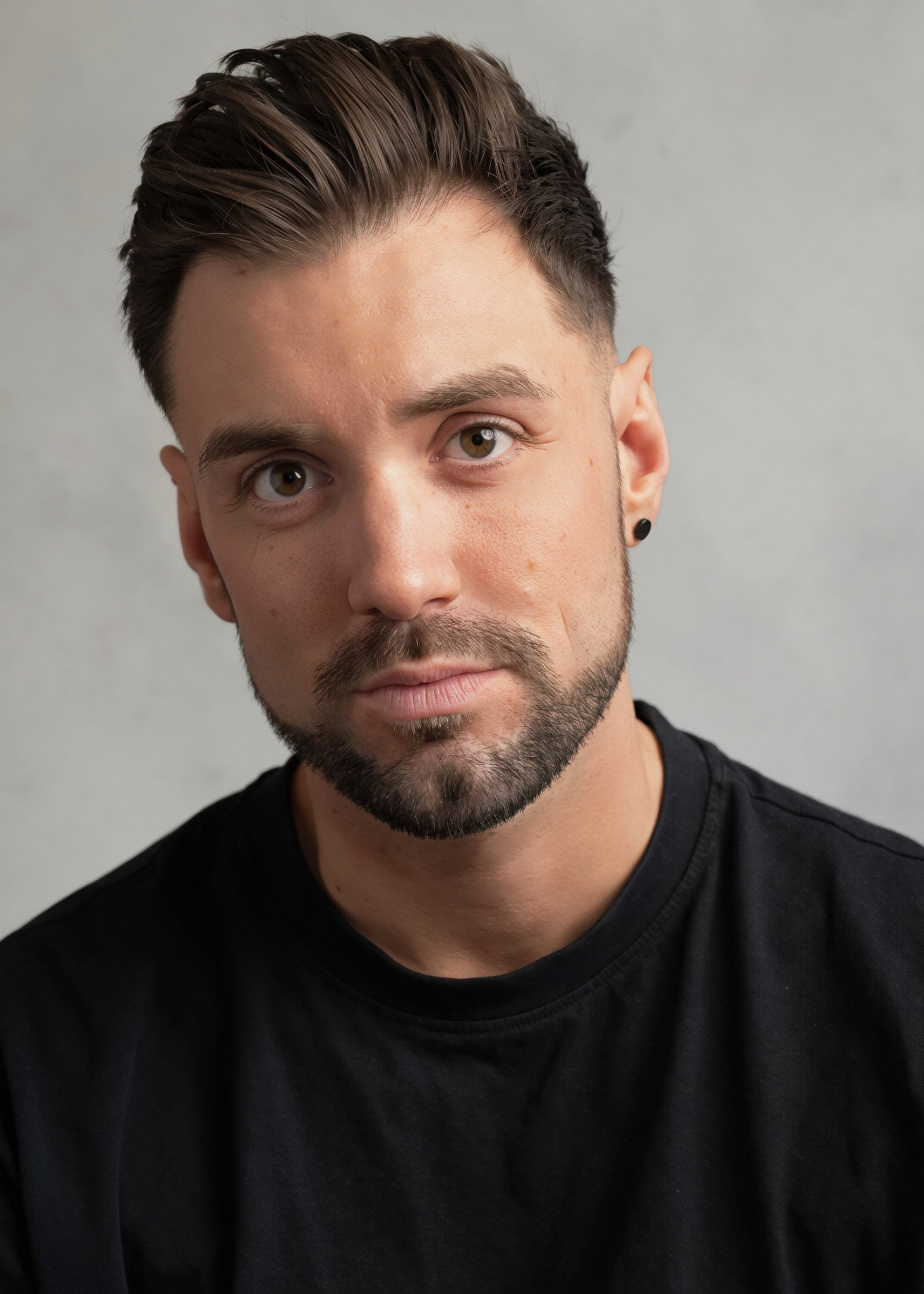
- Born: 24 February 1990 (age 36); Malton, North Yorkshire, England
- Education: Scarborough TEC, Norton College
- Occupations: Entertainer, Skateboarder, Motivational Speaker, Campaigner
- Years active: 2009 – Present
- Known for: Presenter, DJ, Skateboarder
- Height: 6 ft 3 in (191 cm)
- Partner: Samantha Swain
- Children: 4
- Parents: Paul Swain (father); Deborah Swain (mother)
- Awards: BBC Make a Difference Award; York Press Community Pride Person of the Year
- Website: www.ryanswain.co.uk

Signature
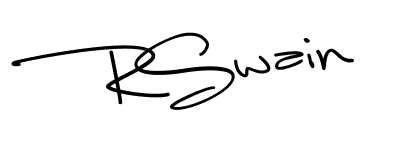

Ryan Swain (born 24 February 1990) is an English radio presenter, DJ, actor, comedian, skateboarder, artist, motivational speaker and neurodiversity campaigner from North Yorkshire. He is known for his work in the entertainment industry, hosting live events and festivals, community engagement, as well as his continued charity work and fundraising.

He founded the You, Me & ADHD campaign and is recognised for work in broadcasting, live performance, and advocacy around ADHD and mental health awareness, neurodiversity, and SEND related issues and politics.

Swain also performs as a Grinch tribute act called The Yorkshire Grinch and owns and founded the Ryedale Skate School which is Skateboard GB accredited as well being a mental health campaigner and ambassador and advocate for neurodiversity.

He won the first BBC Make a Difference Award in the together category with BBC Radio York in October 2022. He also won the "York Community Pride – Person Of Year Award" for his contribution to his local community. In 2023 he was presented with the Everyone Active Outstanding Achievement Award in the Ryedale District Sports Awards for being a key figure in the rebuilding of Malton & Norton Skate Park.

In November 2025 Swain was announced the winner of the Rising Star Of The Year Award in The MBCC Awards, he was presented his award at Hilton Metropole in Birmingham.

He has presented on local radio station YorkMix Radio and York's Minster FM.

== Career ==
=== Presenting & DJin ===
Swain started his career as a coat style entertainer at Flamingo Land Resort in North Yorkshire. He was the first and resident host of the theme park's "Party In The Park" concerts. He progressed to become a weekend presenter on York's Minster FM.

He has also hosted shows on YorkMix Radio, Coast & County Radio and YO1 Radio which was formerly called Vale Radio.

As a DJ and live event host, Swain has played at festivals, nightclubs and large-scale public events across the United Kingdom. He has hosted and DJ'd for dance brand Clubland at the Clubland Weekender at Blackpool Pleasure Beach and Clubland On The Beach, event at Redcars Majuba Beach.

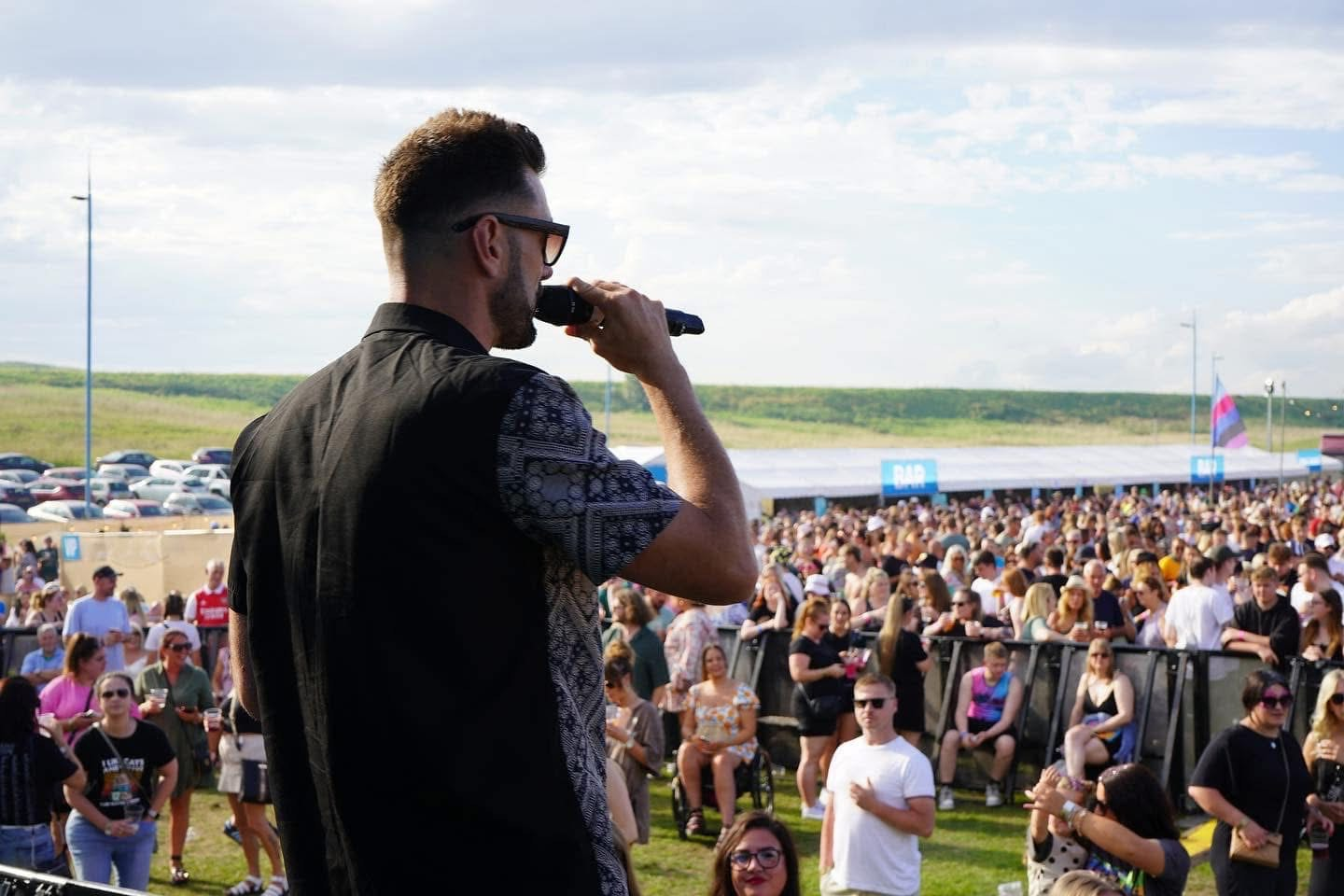
Swain hosting Open Jar Tribute Festival in Hartlepool in 2023

In 2018, he hosted the Only Fools and Horses annual convention at Hull. He hosted and switched on Scarborough's Christmas Lights in November 2019 with Coronation Street star Chris Gascoyne and singer, songwriter Twinnie-Lee Moore.

In February 2020, Swain hosted rapper The Game at Rainton Arena in Houghton Le Spring. After the show he was invited backstage to meet him.

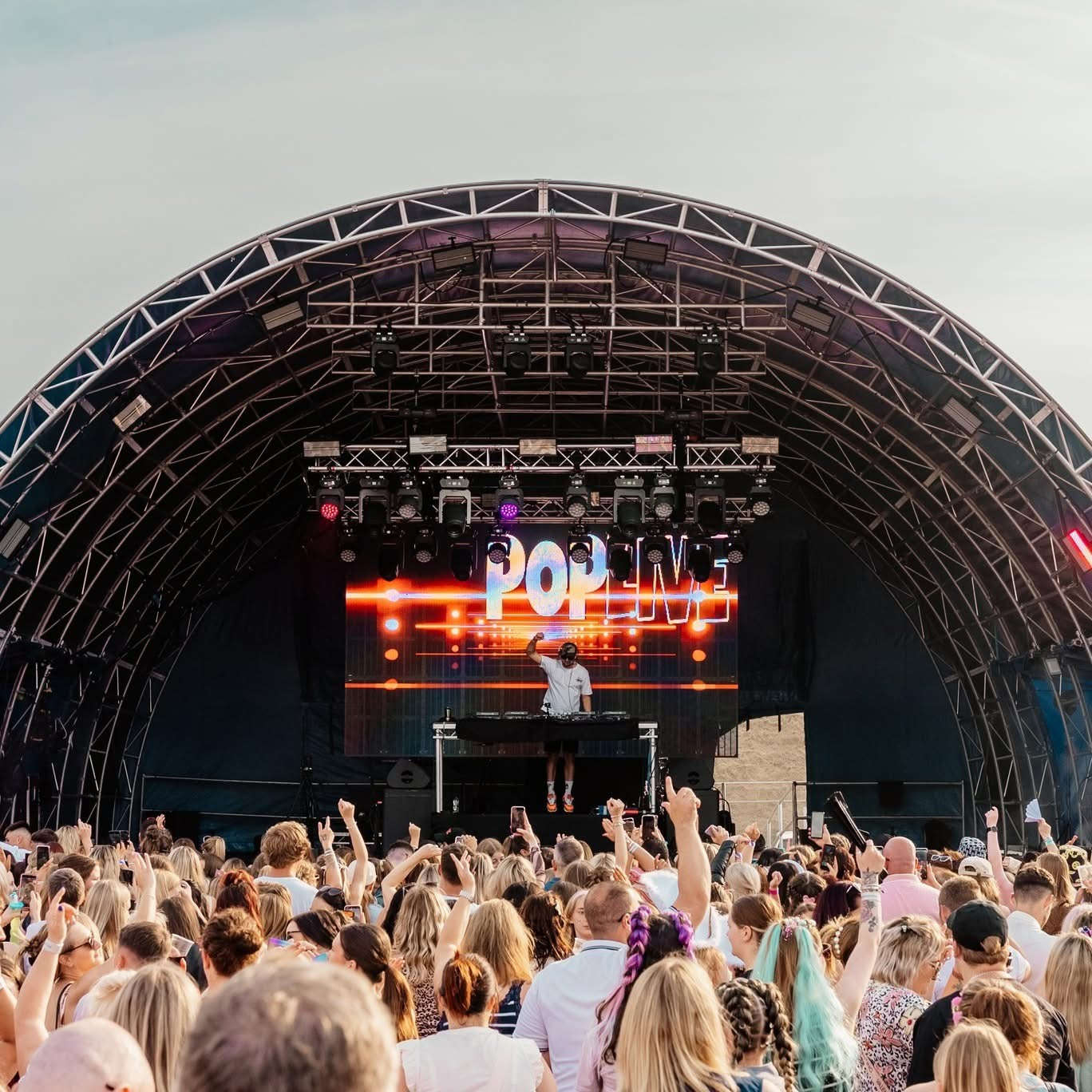
Swain hosting and playing Pop Live at Meridian Showground, Cleethorpes in June 2025

In March 2020, he went on a UK tour with the supergroup Boyz on Block.

During the COVID-19 pandemic, Swain hosted his own version of the TV game show Play Your Cards Right online, initially to entertain NHS staff and front line key workers. He broadcast daily on Instagram live and was joined everday by celebrity guests.

In January 2022, Swain became the official host and face of No Limits Bingo at Majestic Bingo Ltd presenting and touring with the brand's Clubingo franchise.

In March 2025 Swain hosted an evening with Frank Bruno, interviewing him in front of live capacity audience in Norfolk at Dereham Memorial Hall.

Swain was a support act for Ella Henderson's homecoming show in Cleethorpes.

Swain is the main-stage host of the Yorkshire Balloon Fiesta and has hosted various ballooning events nationwide. He hosts and DJs Autumn Lights UK which tours the country's showgrounds.

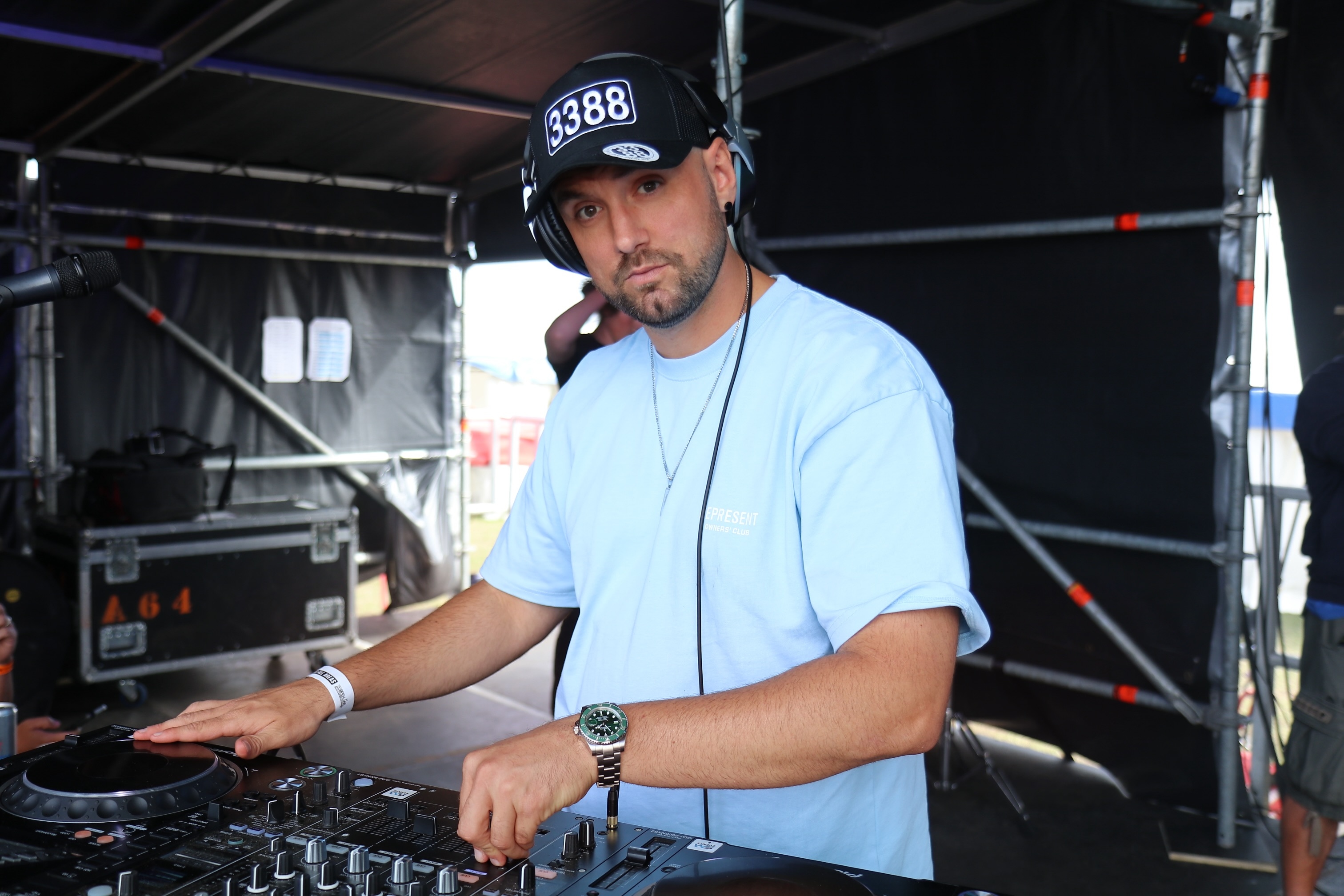
Ryan Swain DJin at Soundwave Festival 2025

Swain is a multi-genre DJ heavily influenced by house, clubland and trance anthems. He is known best for his mash-up mixes. He has played at festivals, live events and nightclubs across the UK. During the COVID-19 pandemic, Swain helped to raise over £25,000 for various charities from doing DJ sets virtually.

=== The Yorkshire Grinch ===
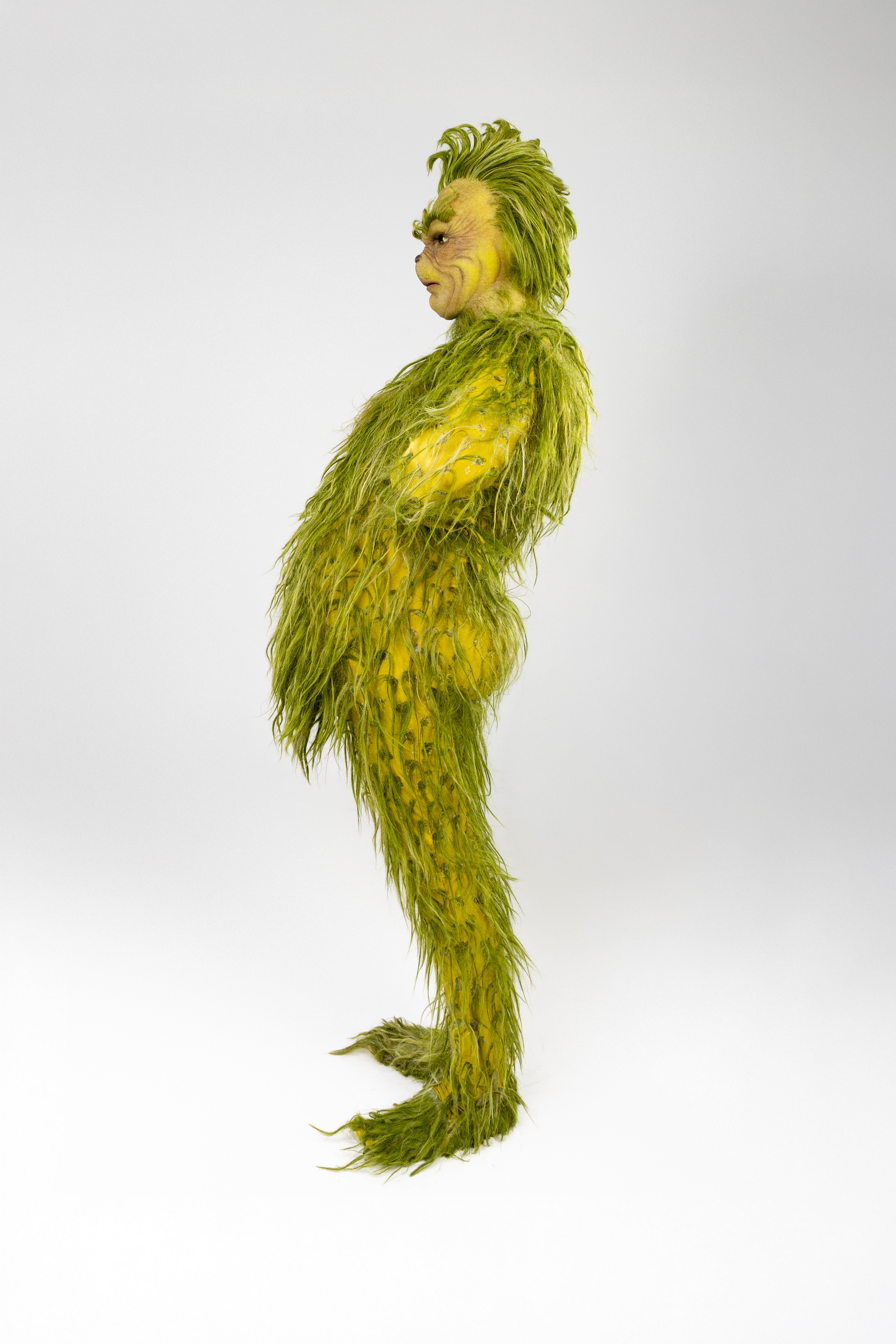
Swain as the Grinch

In November 2024 Swain started a tribute act to the Dr. Seuss character The Grinch, calling himself The Yorkshire Grinch.

He decided to take up the role after being compared to his hero, Jim Carrey, since childhood. Being quoted the "real-life Grinch" by the New York Post.

He has visited hospitals, SEN groups and community hubs spreading festive mayhem. His character tells jokes, eats onions "like a maniac", and 'swallows sugar glass light bulbs' like the real thing.

== Artwork ==
Swain is also a visual artist. During the COVID-19 lockdowns, he returned to art and produced more than 50 works across contemporary street art, sculpture and mixed media. His acrylic painting Carnivore of Colours, depicting a tiger, was entered into the 2021 Ashurst Emerging Artist Prize in London.

In 2021, Swain was selected as a finalist in the Uni-ball POSCA Artist of the Year competition, reaching the competition’s grand final. His selection was reported by The Press in York.

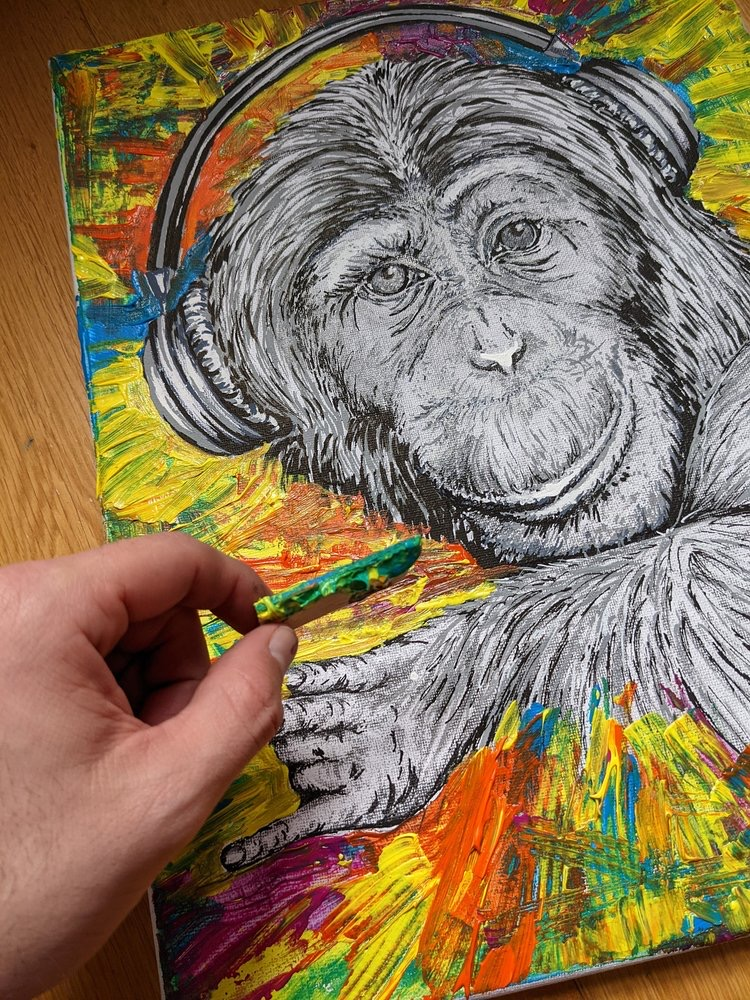
Some of Ryan Swain's Artwork pictured in 2026

== Personal life ==
Swain was born in Malton, North Yorkshire. He was brought up in Norton-on-Derwent. He is of Irish descent and had major heart surgery at the age of 4 to cure a patent ductus arteriosus.

He attended Norton Community Primary School and Norton College. He was expelled from secondary school at the age of 14 due to his ADHD and behaviour. He went on to Scarborough Pupil Referral Unit. After school he studied musical theatre and drama at Westwood Performing Arts Campus at Yorkshire Coast College.

Swain has three children, identical twin daughters, a son and a step-son.

== Celebrity Football, ==
Swain plays football, over the years he's played and made guest appearances for various charity and celebrity teams including The Offside Trust and Hollyoaks FC. He helped raised £15,000 with Danny Dyer and other celebrities to get Saffron Walden toddler Ronnie Leys the life changing operation he needed.

Swain played for celebrity football team Stars United FC. He played as the team's no.1 goalkeeper, a position he often plays.

== Skateboarding ==
Swain is a skateboarding enthusiast. He is also a commentator, broadcaster and MC for action sports events and demonstrations in skateboarding. In May 2012 he skateboarded a record breaking 54.4 miles in 5 hours raising money and awareness for a charity called Louby's Lifeline which supports Brain Tumour Research.

He took a short break from skateboarding, but picked up the sport again during the COVID-19 pandemic after his mental health plummeted.

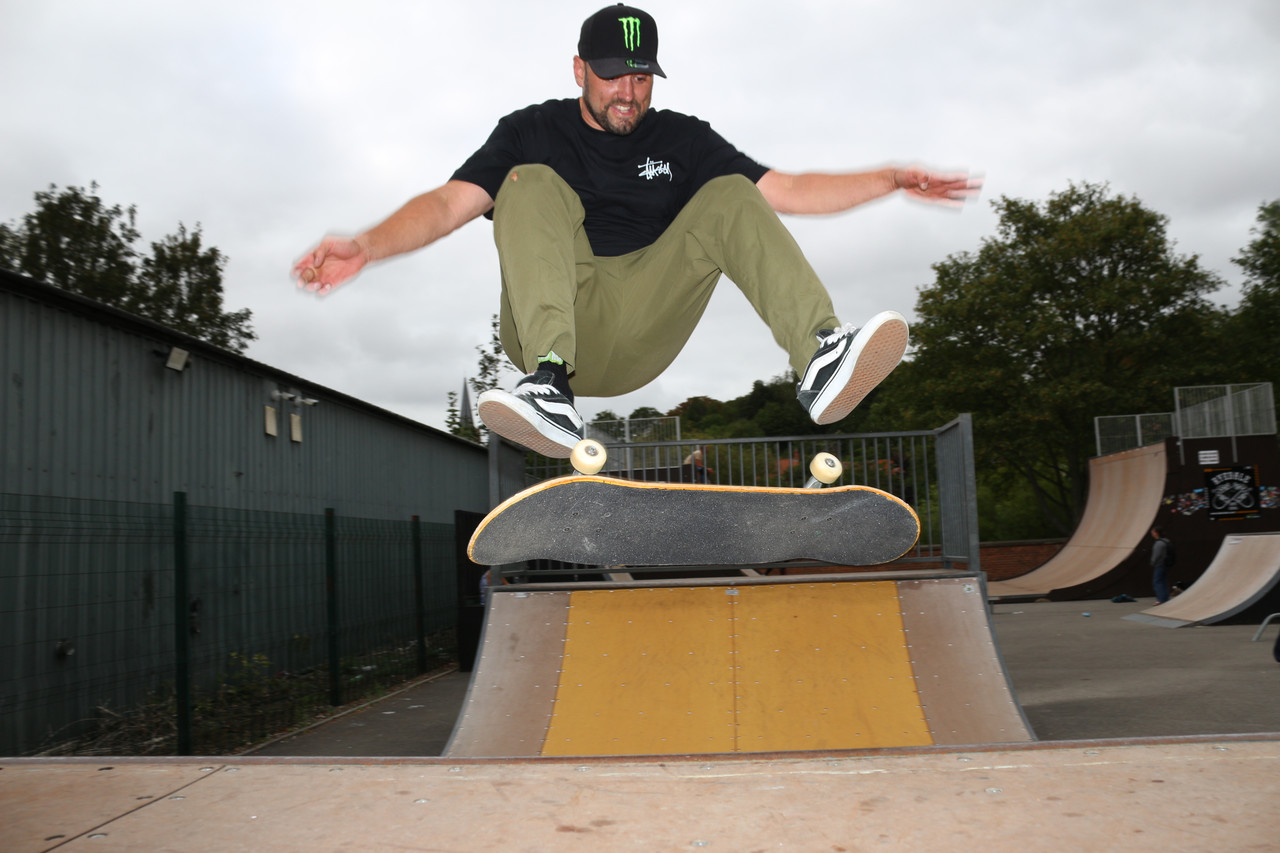
Ryan Swain doing a Frontside Kickflip

=== Rescue the Ramp campaign ===
In March 2021, Swain launched the #RescueTheRamp campaign to save the half-pipe at Norton and Malton Skatepark in North Yorkshire. The wooden vert ramp was one of only nine of its kind in the United Kingdom and the only free, outdoor half-pipe in northern England. The structure, originally a former display ramp from Alton Towers, had become a significant part of the local skateboarding scene.

The campaign gained international attention and received support from professional skateboarders including Tony Hawk, Bam Margera, Danny Way, Bucky Lasek, Andy Macdonald, Christian Hosoi, and BMX rider Jamie Bestwick.

With permission from Norton Town Council, Swain led volunteers, including members of the Norton & Malton Lions Club, to strip back the structure in June 2021 in preparation for restoration. He later secured £15,000 in sponsorship from Habito, the main sponsor of Team GB Skateboarding at the Tokyo Olympics.

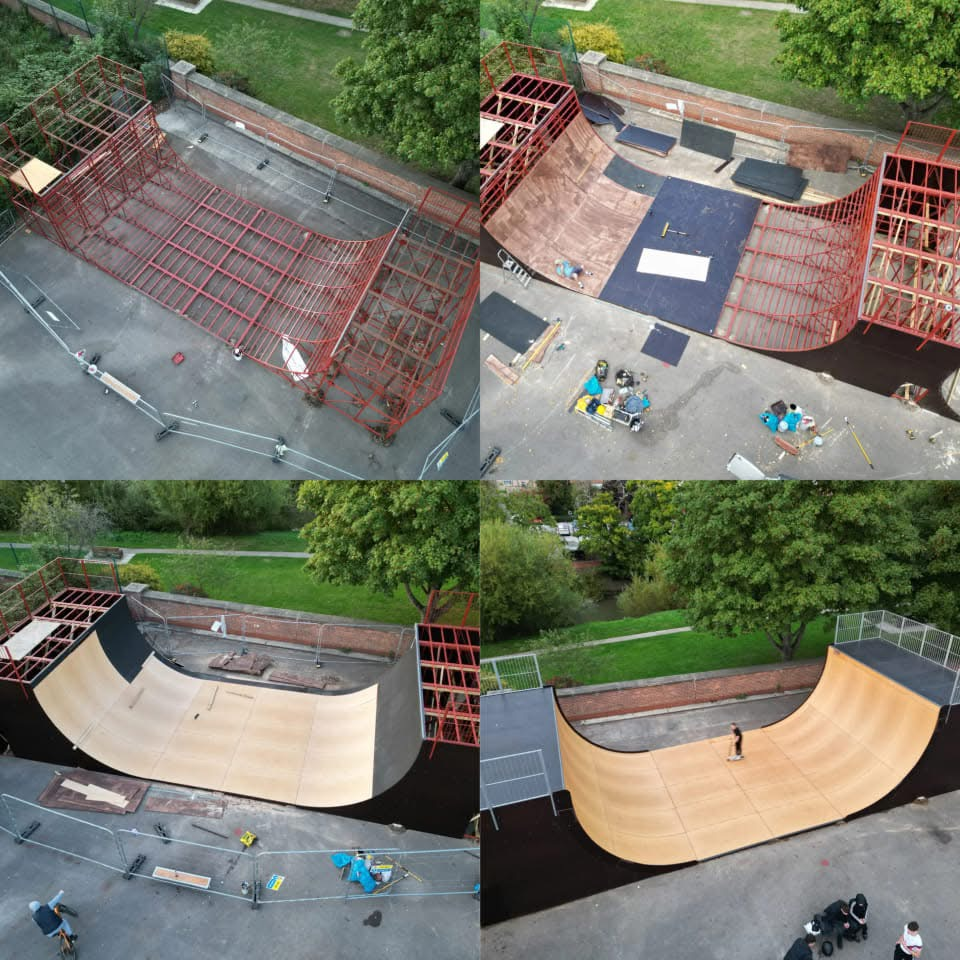
The four stages of the halfpipe refurbishment of the Norton & Malton Skatepark in 2022

Despite progress, in August 2021 the town council halted all volunteer-led works and closed the skatepark on safety grounds, citing concerns raised in a risk assessment. The move prompted widespread public backlash and coverage in national media.

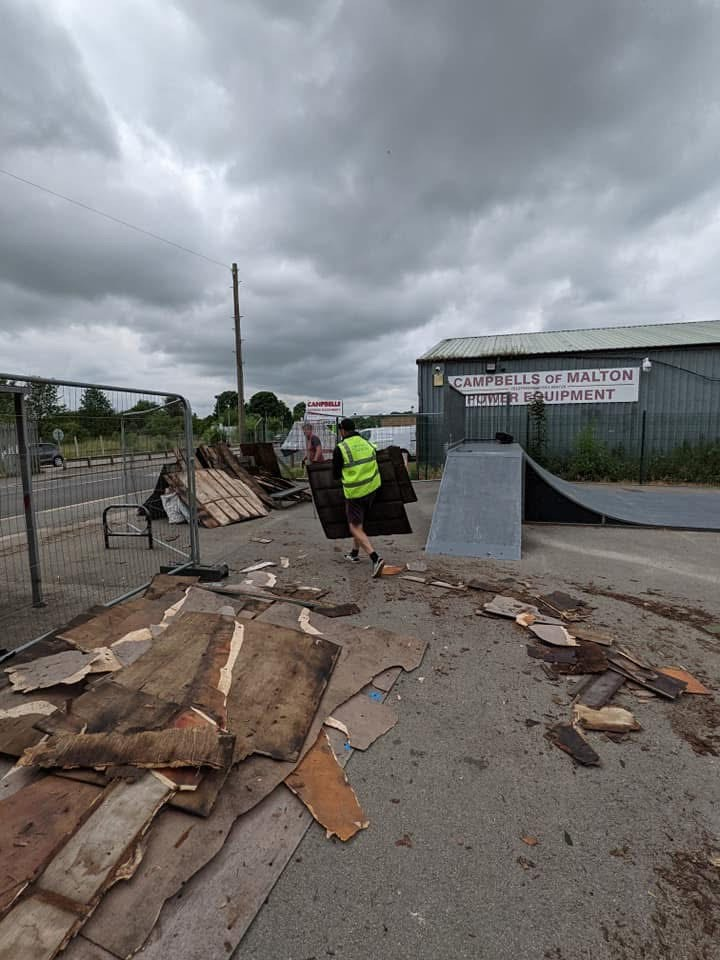
Norton and Malton Skatepark Refurbishment Ryan Swain volunteering

In early 2022, Norton Town Council voted to appoint professional contractors King Ramps to carry out phased repairs. The park partially reopened in April 2022 following inspection by the Royal Society for the Prevention of Accidents (RoSPA), and in June, Ryedale District Council now part of North Yorkshire Council approved £50,000 for the full restoration of the half-pipe. Swain worked alongside the contractors during the rebuild, and the restored facility officially reopened in September 2022 with a launch event featuring music and best trick contests across skateboard, BMX, inline and scooter categories.

Following the success of the campaign, Swain founded the Ryedale Skate School in late 2022, offering skateboarding lessons, outreach programmes and community engagement activities across North Yorkshire. Within its first year, the school had taught over 700 young people in towns including York, Thirsk, Rotherham, Filey, Kirkbymoorside and Thornton-le-Dale. Swain became an accredited coach with Skateboard GB and delivers workshops in schools and public spaces to promote physical activity and inclusion through skateboarding.

In July 2024, the family of Harry Taylor-Robinson a 14-year-old local skater who died of leukaemia donated £2,000 to Ryedale Skate School in his memory to fund free skateboarding lessons for other young people.

=== Skatefest 2026 ===
In July 2026, Swain organised Skatefest 2026 through Ryedale Skate School at Norton and Malton Skatepark in North Yorkshire. The free community festival, organised in partnership with Norton Town Council, featured skateboarding competitions, free coaching sessions, live music, street art and other community activities."SKATEFEST 2026 Returns to Norton & Malton Skatepark for a Free Celebration of Skateboarding, Art and Youth Culture". The Handy Mag. 10 March 2026.

The 2026 event was reported as the biggest Skatefest held at the Norton and Malton Skatepark to date, attracting hundreds of people for skateboarding, arts and community activities."Biggest Skatefest 2026 held at Norton Malton Skatepark". The Press."Biggest Skatefest yet at Norton Malton Skatepark". The Northern Echo."Skatefest 2026 organisers celebrate as hundreds unite for skateboarding, arts and community". The Scarborough News.

The festival formed part of the wider Gateway Festival organised by You Will Be CIC and was attended by David Skaith, Mayor of York and North Yorkshire. The event continued Swain’s work through Ryedale Skate School to provide accessible skateboarding opportunities and encourage participation among children and young people. Swain and fellow organiser Di Keal also discussed the festival and its community aims in an interview with Coast and County Radio ahead of the event."Ryan Swain & Di Keal – Skatefest comes to Norton". Coast and County Radio. 9 July 2026.

=== 100 Mile Challenge ===
In 2022, Swain Skateboarded 100 miles throughout May in support of Cancer Research UK, in a bid to raise money and awareness for the 'Wheel 100' appeal. He completed his challenge in 12 hours and 27 minutes over a period of 3 days on Sunday 15 May 2022 raising £891 the charity.

=== Ryedale Skate School ===
In June 2023 Swain started a skateboarding school in North Yorkshire. Swain is a Skateboard GB Coach. Since starting the skate school in 2023 he has taught over 700 pupils, helping young people learn how to skateboard safely, use facilities and develop their skills as well as their own mental health and well-being.

The skate school has visited skateparks in Malton, Thornton-le-Dale, Kirkbymoorside, Filey, Scarborough, Thirsk and Rotherham as well as schools across the region.

The skate school has donated lessons, equipment and skateboards to local children and funded free places to lessons to those families who have been affected by the cost of living crisis.

=== Skatefest ===
Swain co-organised the free one-day event, which featured professional action sports riders from around the UK, competitions, live bands and music, street art demonstrations, free skate lessons, artisan stalls, and food and drink at Malton & Norton Skatepark in July 2024. The event was in memory of Harry Robinson, who died in September 2020 when he was only 14 years old.

== Guinness World Record attempts ==
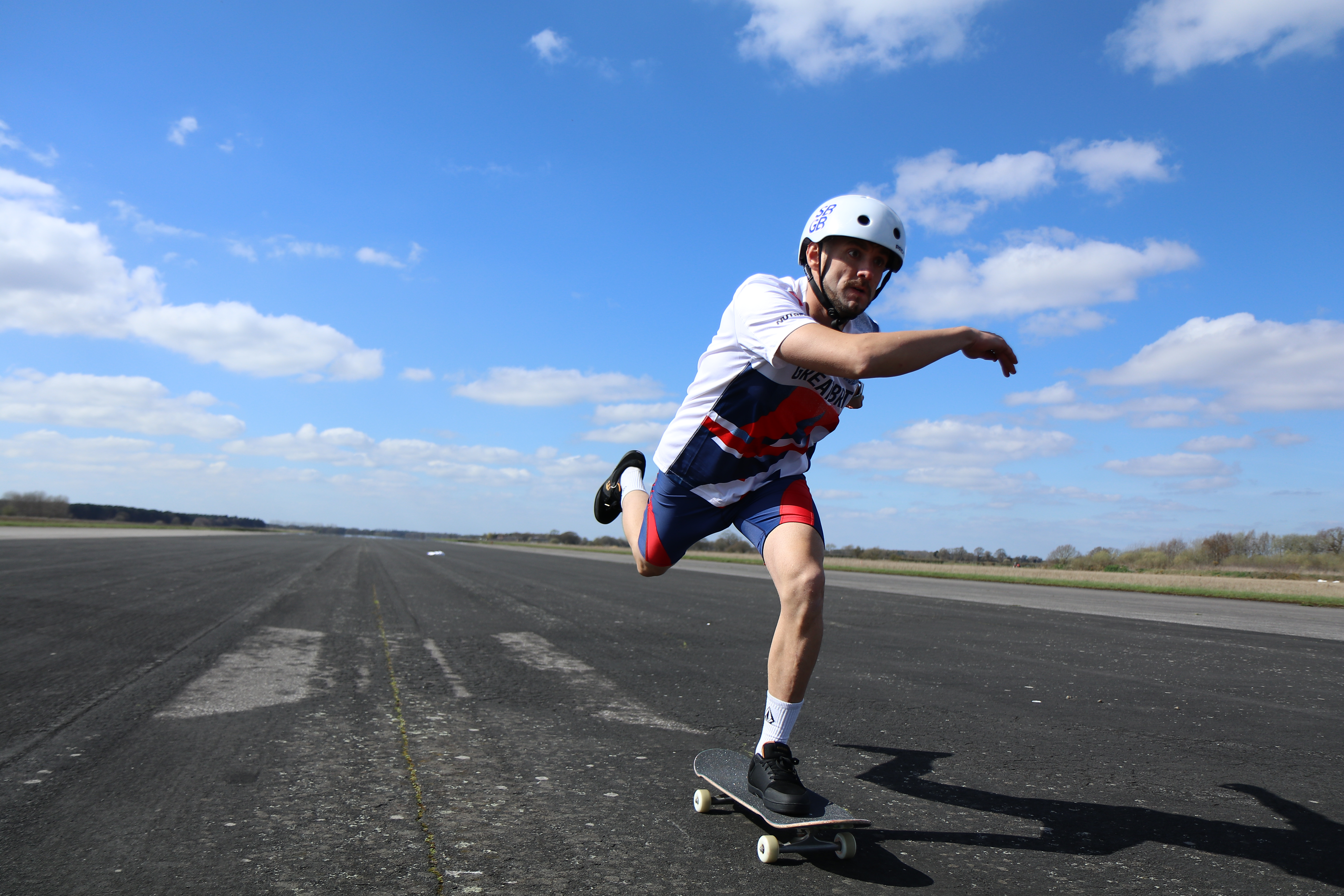
Swain training ahead of his challenge at Elvington Airfield, York

On 14 December 2022 Swain announced he was aiming to set a new world record officially in 2023 for the Guinness World Records in Skateboarding in the hope of travelling 300 miles or more in less than 24 hours – whilst raising money and awareness for Mind (charity). Swain skated 90 miles in adverse weather conditions, getting caught in 15 mph winds and torrential rain on 8 May 2023. He raised over £5,000 for the mental health charities Mind, Andy's Man Club and Next Steps Mental Health Resource Centre before a hamstring injury forced him to stop less than 12 hours into the attempt.

== ADHD, Tourette's and Neurodiversity ==
Swain is a mental health campaigner, advocate and fundraiser. He has Attention deficit hyperactivity disorder (ADHD) and has campaigned for awareness of the condition. Since his diagnosis he has focussed on raising money and awareness and creating content around mental health and wellbeing, the pseudoscientific belief in laws of attraction, and ADHD.

=== You, Me & ADHD ===
You, Me & ADHD is a voluntary motivational and educational speaking programme established by Ryan Swain to raise awareness of attention-deficit/hyperactivity disorder (ADHD) and wider neurodiversity through lived experience and practical guidance. The programme is based on Swain's experiences growing up with undiagnosed ADHD and later being diagnosed in adulthood, which he has described as influencing his education and early life.

Swain's sessions combine personal narrative with discussion of ADHD-related issues such as emotional regulation, organisation and self-acceptance, and are intended to reduce stigma and encourage earlier recognition and support for neurodivergent individuals. According to published reports, Swain holds Level 3 qualifications in neurodiversity and inclusion and mental health support, and has undertaken mental health first aid training, which he incorporates into his speaking programme.

The campaign has been active across the North of England, with events reported at The Glowsticks Project community hub in Middlesbrough and at Ryedale Special Families, among other venues. In October 2025, The York Press reported that the programme visited Leavening Primary School and other community locations in North Yorkshire and the North East as part of a wider outreach tour.

The programme developed from Swain's earlier touring workshops titled ADHD & Me, which were promoted during ADHD Awareness Month in October 2021.

The initiative grew out of his earlier "ADHD & Me" touring workshops first promoted during ADHD Awareness Month in October 2021, which aimed to inspire people, particularly young audiences to speak openly about their mental health and experiences with ADHD and related conditions."Video: ADHD and Me – Ryan goes on tour to share his experiences and help others". YorkMix. Through both programmes, Swain has sought to challenge misconceptions about ADHD and encourage practical understanding, early identification and supportive approaches for neurodivergent individuals.

In 2026, Swain expanded his voluntary You, Me & ADHD awareness tour, partnering with the North Riding County Football Association to promote greater understanding and inclusion of ADHD within grassroots football. The collaboration, including an event at York Racecourse is for coaches and people who work with young people in football understand neurodiversity and to help them identify and comprehend children with Neurodivergent's who they work around. The talk will kickstart a UK tour of schools, community groups and educational settings in Autumn 2026 for ADHD Awareness Month. In May 2026, Swain appeared as a guest on Good Morning Britain, where he was introduced as an ADHD and Tourette’s campaigner."Good Morning Britain Cast & Guests Today, September 2026 & Weekly Schedule". TV Everyday.

In 2026, Swain made a number of media appearances discussing ADHD and neurodiversity. In May, he appeared as a guest on Good Morning Britain, where he was introduced as an ADHD and Tourette’s campaigner."Good Morning Britain Cast & Guests Today, September 2026 & Weekly Schedule". TV Everyday. In June, he appeared on The Clive Holland Show on Fix Radio, discussing his experience of growing up with undiagnosed ADHD, his later diagnosis and the importance of greater awareness and understanding of neurodiversity in workplaces and family environments."Do You Really Know Yourself? ADHD, Neurodiversity & Late Diagnosis". Fix Radio. 19 June 2026.

During ADHD Awareness Month in October 2026, Swain expanded the You, Me & ADHD programme through a series of free educational visits. The initiative reached schools, colleges, alternative provision settings and community organisations, with sessions addressing ADHD, wider neurodiversity, educational inclusion and understanding among pupils, teachers and parents. In an interview published by The Scarborough News on 28 October, Swain reported visiting 27 schools during the month. BBC reporting published on 30 October described more than 25 educational visits through the programme.

=== Parliamentary engagement ===
In 2026, Swain's ADHD awareness campaign expanded to a national platform when he took his "You, Me & ADHD" initiative to the UK Parliament. The campaign, which focuses on lived experience and improving understanding of neurodiversity in education, formed part of wider discussions around ADHD awareness and support. Swain has stated his aim is to influence long-term change in how ADHD is recognised and supported within schools and communities.

Swain was invited to contribute to discussions at the All-Party Parliamentary Group (APPG) on ADHD, where he provided lived-experience insight as part of wider engagement with policymakers, clinicians and stakeholders. During these sessions, he spoke about the importance of early understanding of ADHD, the need for greater awareness within the education system, and the impact that misunderstanding and lack of support can have on young people and families. His contribution formed part of ongoing conversations aimed at improving national awareness and support structures for individuals with ADHD.

In March 2026, Swain attended a meeting of an All-Party Parliamentary Group (APPG) at the House of Commons concerning proposed reforms to Special Educational Needs and Disabilities (SEND) provision. During the meeting, he called for greater consideration of the experiences of children, parents and those awaiting diagnosis alongside discussions surrounding educational structures and funding. Swain argued that greater awareness and understanding of ADHD should form part of inclusive education. Following the meeting, he was invited to return to Parliament for a dedicated ADHD event chaired by Labour MP Jo Platt.Kennedy, Emma (25 March 2026). "Ryedale ADHD campaigner takes fight for awareness to Westminster". The Press.

In July 2026, Swain contributed to a joint meeting of the All-Party Parliamentary Groups for Dyslexia, Autism and ADHD. The British Dyslexia Association identified Swain as the founder of You, Me & ADHD and reported that he discussed his lived experience of ADHD and his work delivering awareness sessions in schools across the country. During the meeting, he highlighted the need for improved understanding of neurodivergence among teachers, pupils and parents, including greater support for young people to understand what their diagnoses mean."July 2026 - APPG for Dyslexia, Autism and ADHD – Joint Meeting". British Dyslexia Association. July 2026.

== ADHD and Tourette's ==
Swain has been open about living with both attention-deficit/hyperactivity disorder (ADHD) and Tourette's syndrome, conditions he describes as central to both his personal journey and his professional purpose.

=== Diagnosis and early challenges ===
During his school years, Swain frequently struggled with focus, impulsivity and classroom disruption, which led to repeated disciplinary action and ultimately his exclusion from school at the age of fifteen. He later received an official diagnosis of ADHD in his early twenties after years of feeling misunderstood. Swain has said that understanding his diagnosis gave him "a vocabulary for chaos" and helped him to develop coping strategies built on structure and self-discipline.

=== ADHD perspective ===
He has called ADHD a killer if it isn't harnessed correctly and sees both a major challenge and a "superpower".

=== Tourette's syndrome ===
Swain has also shared his experiences with Tourette's syndrome, which manifests for him through physical tics such as shoulder and head jolts, winks and throat clicks. He has explained that these tics are triggered or intensified by stress, fatigue, or over-stimulation, and can ease during periods of focus or performance. By speaking about Tourette's publicly, Swain aims to normalise discussion around the condition and reduce stigma toward people who experience involuntary movements or sounds.

=== Advocacy and awareness ===
Swain set up the You, Me & ADHD campaign, a voluntary programme delivering free talks and workshops in schools, universities and community settings across the United Kingdom. Drawing from his lived experience, he works to increase understanding of neurodiversity, challenge stereotypes and encourage earlier recognition and support for ADHD and related conditions.

During ADHD Awareness Month in October 2021 he said that he was planning a countrywide motivational speaking tour to raise awareness of ADHD. The tour, called 'ADHD & Me', which is a motivational and educational talk and touring show aimed at all age groups but mainly young people, which is encouraging people to speak out about their mental health disorders.

During ADHD Awareness Month in October 2025, Swain visited Leavening Primary School as part of his voluntary outreach across North Yorkshire and the North East to raise awareness of attention deficit hyperactivity disorder (ADHD) and wider neurodiversity. The speaking programme, titled You, Me & ADHD, combined motivational and educational content for pupils, staff and parents, with sessions on reducing stigma, sharing lived experience, and offering strategies for support.

== Charity Work & Fundraising ==
Swain has been involved in charity fundraising and community initiatives from an early age, with activities supporting homelessness charities, health research, mental health awareness and youth causes. His fundraising work has been regularly covered by regional media.

In 2007, his early community involvement was recognised when he received the Huggable Hero Award from Build-A-Bear Workshop, awarded to young people demonstrating charitable engagement.

In December 2019 he raised more than £1,750 for the York charity SASH and Simon On The Streets in Leeds by re-enacting a rough sleep. He also sold personal artwork, spending 24 hours on the streets.

During the COVID-19 pandemic he live streamed his performances and DJ sets across charity pages and groups on Facebook, helping to raise over £25,000 for various NHS Charities.

Swain was nominated for the Inspirational Individual Of The Year award in the Yorkshire Choice Awards 2022 in recognition of his charity work in his local community, the NHS and for mental health awareness he has raised.

== Royal invitation ==
In 2026, Ryan Swain received an official invitation to attend a Royal Garden Party at Buckingham Palace, hosted by King Charles III. The invitation formed part of the British honours and recognition system, which acknowledges individuals who have made significant contributions to their communities through voluntary service and public work.

Swain was invited in recognition of his charity fundraising and grassroots community initiatives, including his work supporting young people and families through advocacy and education programmes.

Royal Garden Parties are traditionally held at Buckingham Palace and hosted by the monarch, bringing together thousands of guests from across the United Kingdom who have been recognised for their contributions to public life and their local communities.

Swain attended the event alongside his partner following the official invitation issued via the Lord Chamberlain's Office.

== Serotonin Syndrome Incident ==
In 2025, Ryan Swain experienced a severe case of serotonin syndrome, a rare but potentially life-threatening condition caused by an excess of serotonin in the central nervous system. The syndrome is most commonly associated with serotonergic medications, particularly following dosage increases or interactions between drugs.

Serotonin syndrome is characterised by a range of cognitive, autonomic and neuromuscular symptoms. These may include agitation, confusion, rapid heart rate, high blood pressure, dilated pupils, sweating, diarrhoea, muscle rigidity, tremor and hyperreflexia. In more severe cases, the condition can escalate rapidly and lead to seizures, loss of consciousness, organ failure or death if not treated promptly. The onset of symptoms can occur within hours of a medication change and typically requires urgent medical assessment and intervention.

According to media reports, Swain developed acute and severe symptoms shortly after a prescribed dosage increase. These included extreme muscle rigidity, seizure-like episodes, loss of speech and an inability to move. He described the experience as his body "shutting down", and required emergency medical treatment and hospitalisation.

Regional reporting stated that symptoms escalated rapidly over a short period, with the reaction described as life-threatening. Swain underwent medical treatment and monitoring as part of his recovery, with the incident prompting further investigation into the cause and management of the condition.

Following the incident, Swain has spoken publicly about his experience to raise awareness of serotonin syndrome, including the potential risks associated with prescribed medications and the importance of recognising early symptoms and seeking prompt medical attention.

== Awards ==
- Phoenix Newspaper Award for People's Choice – Winner (2018 and 2020)
- Yorkshire Gig Guide Grassroots Award for Outstanding Individual Contribution – Winner (2018)
- The National Entertainment Awards – Winner (2019)
- The York Press Community Pride Awards - Person Of The Year - Winner (2022)
- BBC Make A Difference – Together Award – Winner (2022)
- Everyone Active – Outstanding Achievement Award – Winner (2023)
- The MBCC Awards - Rising Star Of The Year (2025)
