= Ryan Swain =

Ryan Swain may refer to:

- Ryan Jamaal Swain, American actor and dancer
- Ryan Swain (presenter), English television, radio, live events presenter, and comedian
