= Skateboard (disambiguation) =

Skateboards are personal wheeled vehicles consisting of a rounded rectangular flat board atop four wheels, in sets of two on two bogies, that travels along its long axis, used for recreation and sports.

Skateboard or variation, may also refer to:

- Skateboard (automotive platform), a type of vehicle chassis for electric vehicles
- Self-balancing scooter, a.k.a. "hoverboard", sometimes called skateboards
- Skateboard (film), 1978 U.S. sports drama film
- Skateboard GB, the governing body for skateboarding in the UK
- The Skateboard Mag, a defunct skateboarding magazine

== See also ==
- Skateboarder
- Skateboarding
- Skateboard P., Pharrell Williams (born 1973), singer
- Electric skateboard
- Board (disambiguation)
- Skate (disambiguation)
