= St Peter's Church, Norton-on-Derwent =

Church in Norton-on-Derwent, North Yorkshire, England

Coordinates: 54°07′44″N 0°47′10″W

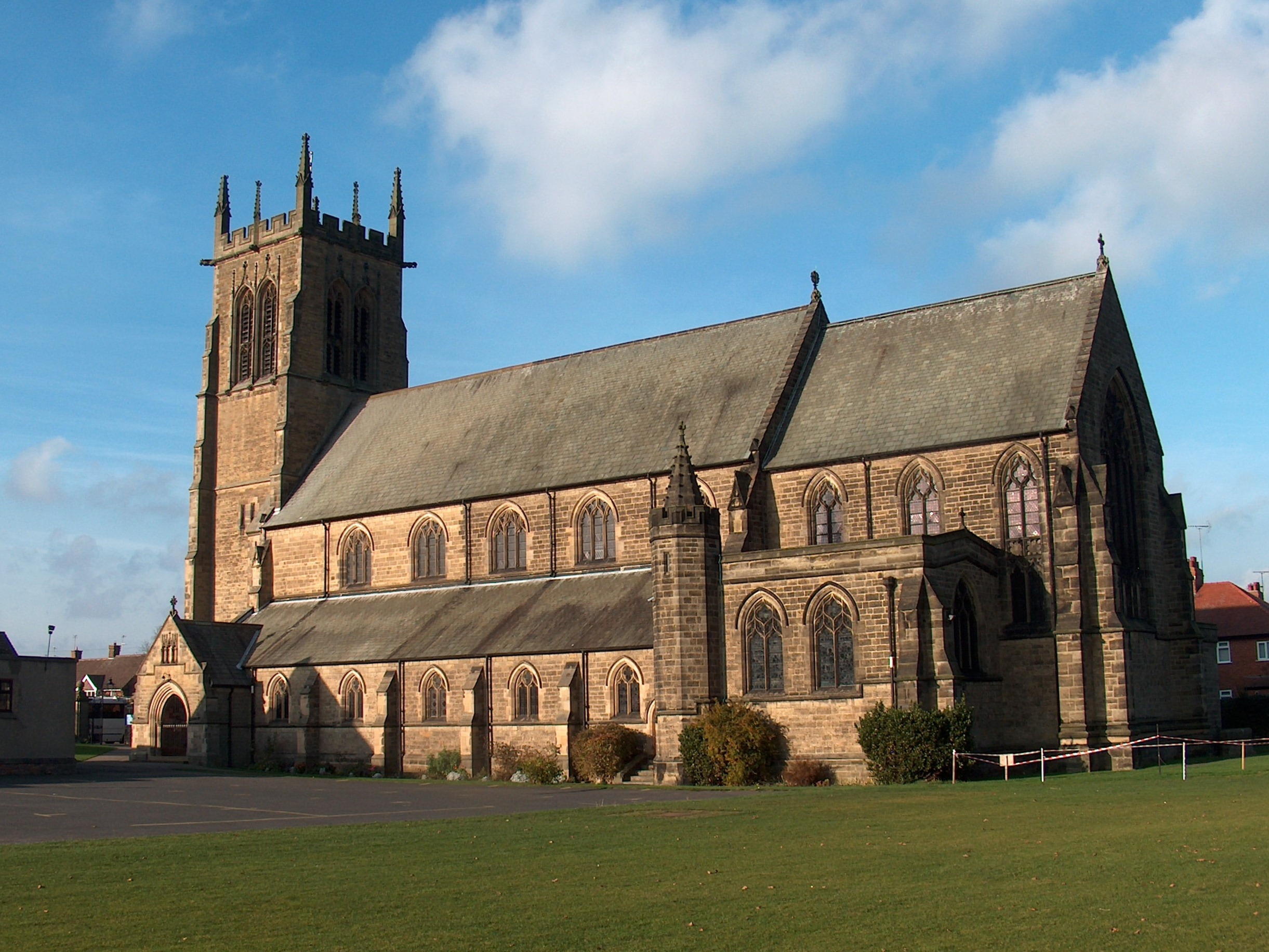
The church, in 2011

St Peter's Church is the parish church of Norton-on-Derwent, a town in North Yorkshire, in England.

== History ==
There was a Mediaeval church in Norton, dedicated to Saint Nicholas. In 1814, it was demolished and replaced by a new building, described by Sir Stephen Glynne, 9th Baronet, as "in a plain style without a steeple". The current church was built between 1889 and 1891 to a design by C. Hodgson Fowler. It was dedicated to Saint Peter, as William Thomson, Archbishop of York believed that one of the churches in Norton or neighbouring Malton should be dedicated to an apostle. The Mediaeval font which was thrown out in 1814 had been preserved as a garden ornament and was returned to the new building. The church was grade II listed in 1967.

The church is built of sandstone with a slate roof. It consists of a nave with a clerestory, north and south aisles, a south porch, a chancel with a vestry, organ chamber and south chapel, and a west tower. The tower has four stages, buttresses, a plinth, and a west doorway with a hood mould, above which is a four-light west window with a hood mould. In the third stage is a ledge with a statue under a crocketed canopy, over which are two-light bell openings, a corbel table, and an embattled parapet with crocketed pinnacles. Inside, there is a 12th-century font on a modern plinth, a pulpit and tester designed by Walter Brierley, and two stained glass windows by Charles Eamer Kempe, the east window being a memorial to the Second Boer War.

== See also ==
- Listed buildings in Norton-on-Derwent
