= Listed buildings in Carlton Miniott =

Carlton Miniott is a civil parish in the county of North Yorkshire, England. It contains four listed buildings that are recorded in the National Heritage List for England. All the listed buildings are designated at Grade II, the lowest of the three grades, which is applied to "buildings of national importance and special interest". The parish contains the village of Carlton Miniott and the surrounding area. All the listed buildings are in the village, and consist of a farmhouse, a dovecote, a milepost and a church.

== Buildings ==
Name and location	Photograph	Date	Notes
Carlton House; 54.22726°N 1.38573°W	—	1815	A farmhouse in red brick with a pantile roof and stone coping. There are two storeys, three bays, and a lower rear wing. The central doorway has Doric pilasters, a four-light fanlight, a frieze and a pediment, and the windows are sashes with flat brick arches.
Dovecote; 54.22744°N 1.38608°W	—	1815	The dovecote at the rear of Carlton House is in red brick with an eaves band and a hipped pantile roof. There are two storeys, a square plan and a single bay. It contains a blind circular opening, above which is blocked semicircular opening, and dove openings in a triangular pattern. On the roof is a square cupola with a hipped roof and a weathervane.
Milepost; 54.22455°N 1.39251°W		Late 19th century	The milepost on the southeast side of the A61 road is in cast iron, and has a triangular plan with a semicircular top. On the top is inscribed "NORTH RIDING OF YORKSHIRE" and "THIRSK RDC", and on the sides are pointing arrows, on the left side is the distance to Ripon and on the right side the distance to Thirsk.
St Lawrence's Church; 54.22348°N 1.39598°W		1895–96	The church, designed by C. Hodgson Fowler, is in red brick with stone dressings and a red tile roof. It consists of a nave, a south porch, and a chancel with a north vestry. On the junction of the nave and the chancel is a spirelet with a wooden bellcote and a pyramidal slate roof. The porch has a stone front, and buttresses rising to an apex with a crucifix, and it contains a doorway with a four-centred arch.
