= St Lawrence's Church, Carlton Miniott =

Church in Carlton Miniott, North Yorkshire, England

Coordinates: 54°13′24″N 1°23′45″W

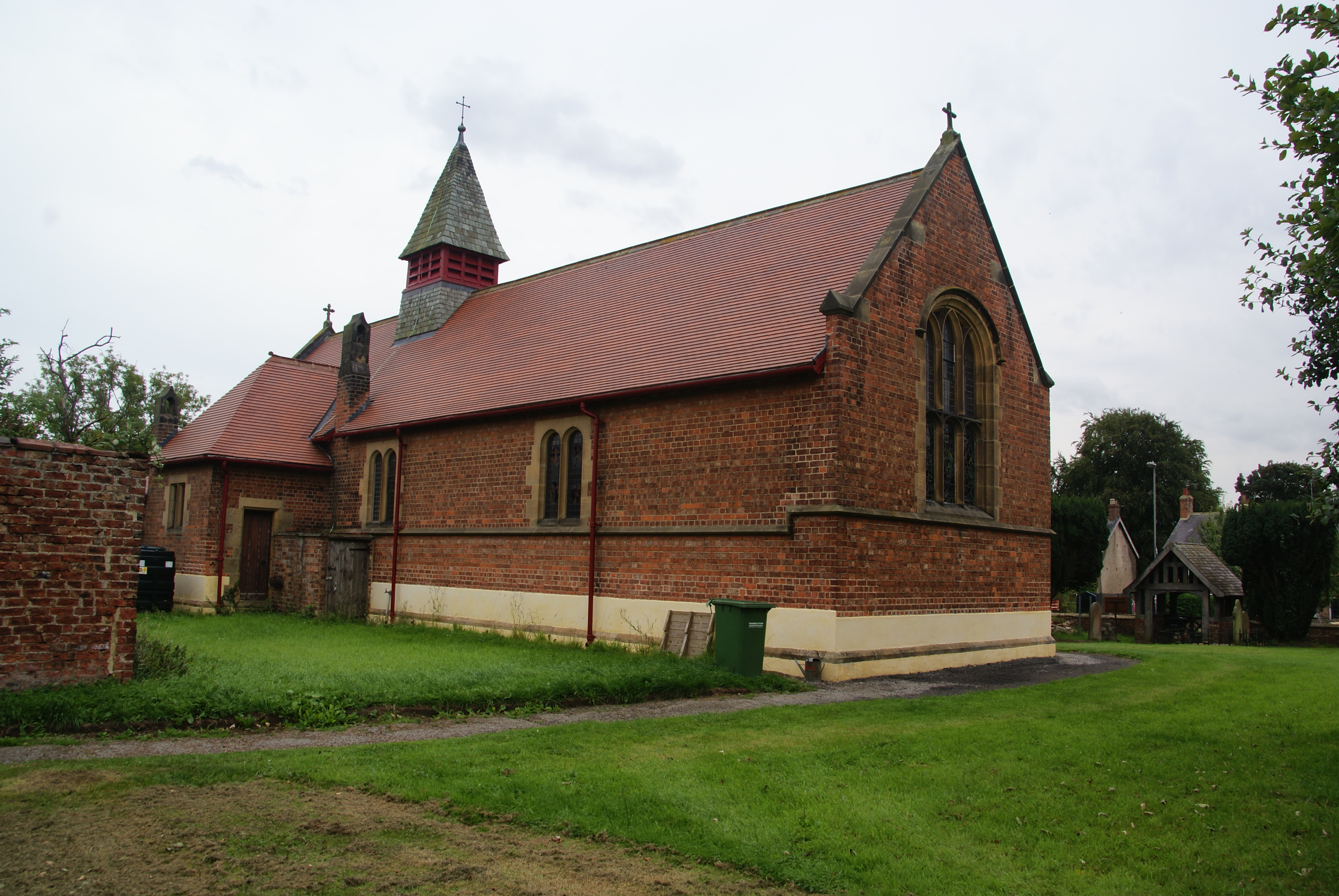
The church, in 2013

St Lawrence's Church is an Anglican church in Carlton Miniott, a village in North Yorkshire, in England.

The first building on the site was a chapel of ease to St Mary's Church, Thirsk, in existence by 1621. In 1848 it was described simply as "small". The building was rebuilt between 1895 and 1896 by C. Hodgson Fowler, incorporating some decorated wood from the old church. The church has remained essentially unaltered since, and it was Grade II listed in 2005.

The church is built of red brick with stone dressings and a red tile roof. It consists of a nave, a south porch, and a chancel with a north vestry. On the junction of the nave and the chancel is a spirelet with a wooden bellcote and a pyramidal slate roof. The porch has a stone front, and buttresses rising to an apex with a crucifix, and it contains a doorway with a four-centred arch.

The east window of the church has stained glass depicting the crucifixion of Jesus and a war memorial. Hodgson Fowler's decorative scheme survives largely intact, including the painted barrel-vaulted ceiling, wooden panelling on the lower part of the walls, reredos, and pews. The pulpit is from the previous church, as are various decorated pieces of wood on display.

== See also ==
- Listed buildings in Carlton Miniott
