= Listed buildings in Norton-on-Derwent =

Norton-on-Derwent is a civil parish in the county of North Yorkshire, England. It contains 20 listed buildings that are recorded in the National Heritage List for England. All the listed buildings are designated at Grade II, the lowest of the three grades, which is applied to "buildings of national importance and special interest". The parish contains the town of Norton-on-Derwent and the surrounding area. All the listed buildings are in the town, and most are houses, cottages and associated structures. The other listed buildings include a barn, a railway station, a former police station, a church and a shop.

== Buildings ==
Name and location	Photograph	Date	Notes
The Elms; 54.13205°N 0.78629°W	—	Early 18th century	The house is in sandstone on a plinth, with an extension in red brick, and a pantile roof with coped gables and shaped kneelers. There are two storeys, three bays, and a rear extension. In the centre is a porch with fluted Doric columns and an entablature. This is flanked by tripartite sash windows, on the upper floor are single-light sashes, and all the windows have wedge lintels.
3 Scarborough Road; 54.13347°N 0.78113°W	—	Mid to late 18th century	The house is in limestone, with dressings in variegated brick, an extension in red brick, and a pantile roof. There are two storeys, two bays, and a rear extension. On the front is a doorway, the windows are sashes, and the ground floor openings have segmental arches.
Leat House and conservatory 54.12676°N 0.79199°W	—	Mid to late 18th century	A house, later a hotel, in limestone, with an extension in red brick, and a pantile roof with shaped kneelers and a coped gable on the left. There are two storeys and an attic, a double-depth plan, a front of four bays, a single-bay extension on the left, a lean-to extension further to the left, and a conservatory on the right . On the front is a porch with square Ionic columns and a pediment. To the right is a canted bay window, and the other windows are sashes.
The Union; 54.13236°N 0.78499°W		Late 18th century	Probably a house and a cottage, later a public house, in painted brick on a plinth, with a modillion eaves course on the left, and a moulded eaves cornice on the right, and a pantile roof with coped gables and shaped kneelers. There are two storeys and five bays. On the front is a doorway with fluted pilasters, a fanlight, and a dentilled cornice. The windows are sashes with wedge lintels and keystones.
Sutton Farm Stone Barn; 54.12417°N 0.78588°W	—	1789	The barn, stables and shed are in sandstone on a plinth, with a hipped slate roof. The barn has two storeys and nine bays. In the centre are double doors flanked by buttresses, doors and windows, and all the openings on the front have segmental arches with voussoirs. Over the central doors is a circular dated panel. The rear is flanked by taller end pavilions and the openings have semicircular heads.
28 Church Street; 54.13215°N 0.78839°W	—	c. 1800	A house and a shop, in brick at the front, in stone with brick quoins at the rear, with dentilled eaves, and a pantile roof. There are three storeys and two bays. On the front is a projecting shop extension with pilasters, an entablature fascia board, and a coped parapet. Recessed on the left is a doorway. The middle floor contains a sash window and a canted bay window, and on the top floor are horizontally-sliding sashes.
4 and 6 Commercial Street and railings 54.13203°N 0.78729°W	—	Early 19th century	A pair of houses in red brick with a pantile roof. There are two storeys and a basement, and two bays. The paired central doorways have a continuous lintel, and are approached by two flights of steps over paired basement doors with slender cast iron railings. The windows are sashes, those in the lower floor with wedge lintels.
8, 10 and 12 Commercial Street; 54.13205°N 0.78714°W	—	Early 19th century	A row of three houses in variegated brick with a pantile roof. There are three storeys and three bays. On the ground floor are three doorways with wedge lintels, those in the outer bays with fanlights. The middle bay contains a shop window, and elsewhere the windows are sashes with wedge lintels.
16 Commercial Street and railings 54.13207°N 0.78687°W	—	Early 19th century	The house is in variegated brick with a pantile roof. There are three storeys and two bays. On the front are two doorways approached by steps, each with fluted pilasters, a fanlight and a bracketed cornice. The windows are sashes, and the openings in the lower two floors have wedge lintels. The steps have slender cast iron railings.
64–70 Commercial Street; 54.13248°N 0.78415°W	—	Early 19th century	A terrace of four houses in variegated brick, with dressings in red brick, quoins, a modillion eaves course, and a pantile roof with coped gables and shaped kneelers. There are three storeys and four bays. Each house has a doorway approached by steps, with wedge lintels. On the ground floor are three bow windows. In the second bay and the upper two floors are horizontally-sliding sash windows, those in the middle floor with wedge lintels and quoined jambs.
90 Commercial Street; 54.13265°N 0.78214°W	—	Early 19th century	A house in variegated brick, with red brick dressings, quoins, a floor band, an eaves cornice, and a slate roof. There are two storeys and three bays. The central doorway has pilaster jambs, a divided fanlight, and a cornice on scrolled consoles. Above the doorway is a blocked window, and the other windows are sashes with quoined surrounds. In the attic are two gabled dormers with bargeboards.
Quarry House; 54.13930°N 0.77476°W	—	Early 19th century	The house, which incorporates an earlier house, is in limestone and has an M-shaped pantile roof with coped gables and shaped kneelers. The central block has two storeys and an attic, a double depth plan, and two bays, with flanking two-storey single-bay wings. On the front is a French window and a canted bay window with a cornice in the ground floor, and the upper floor and attic contain horizontally-sliding sash windows. The windows on the wings are casements, with segmental brick arches in the ground floor and wedge lintels in the upper floor.
Whitewall Cottages and stable building 54.11986°N 0.79141°W		Early 19th century	A row of eight, later four, cottages and a stable, in whitewashed sandstone on a plinth, with a stepped eaves course, and a pantile roof, with a shaped kneelers and coped gable on the left. There are two storeys and nine bays. On the front are four doorways, small-paned windows, and two round arched niches, one containing a cast iron pump.
Whitewall House and outbuilding 54.11991°N 0.79073°W	—	Early 19th century	The house is in whitewashed stucco, with a dentilled eaves course, and a slate roof with coped gables and shaped kneelers. There are two storeys and an attic and four bays, and a single-storey outbuilding on the right. The doorway has a fanlight and a pedimented doorhood on brackets. On the outer bays are canted bay windows, and the other windows are sashes with wedge lintels. On the outbuilding is a weathervane, and an overthrow linking to the cottages.
Malton railway station 54.13204°N 0.79756°W		1845	The railway station was design by G. T. Andrews for the York and North Midland Railway and later extended. It is in sandstone, the extension is in red brick, and it has slated and glazed roofs. There is a single-storey main range of seven bays, two-storey pavilions at each end and a two-storey range further to the left. To the right is the stationmaster's house, with a plinth and a floor band, two storeys, fronts of two and three bays, and a hipped roof with oversailing eaves.
2-8 Langton Road; 54.13101°N 0.78734°W	—	1855	A terrace of four houses in variegated brick, with red brick dressings, a raised sill band, overhanging eaves and a hipped slate roof. There are three storeys, the right house has three bays, and the others have two. Each house has a doorway with pilasters, a fanlight and an entablature, and a canted bay window on the ground floor. The windows on the upper floors are sashes with segmental heads and quoined jambs, and there is an inscribed datestone.
10-16 Langton Road; 54.13068°N 0.78719°W	—	1855	A terrace of four houses in variegated brick, with red brick dressings, a raised sill band, a timber eaves cornice, modillion eaves to the centre houses, and a hipped slate roof. There are three storeys and eight bays. On the right of each house is a doorway with pilasters, a fanlight and an entablature, and to the left is a canted bay window, in the left house with two storeys, and elsewhere with one storey. The windows on the upper floors are sashes with segmental heads and quoined jambs.
84A Commercial Street; 54.13254°N 0.78348°W	—	Late 19th century	A police station and house, later used for other purposes, in variegated brick, with dressings in yellow and red brick, and a hipped slate roof. There are two storeys and an attic, and two bays, with the end facing the street. In the right bay is a Doric portico approached by steps flanked by iron railings, and to the left is a two-storey canted bay window, over which is a band of cogged brick and a parapet. Above the portico are sash windows. In the left return is a doorway with Doric pilasters and an entablature.
St Peter's Church; 54.12903°N 0.78604°W		1889–91	The church, designed by C. Hodgson Fowler, is in sandstone with a slate roof. It consists of a nave with a clerestory, north and south aisles, a south porch, a chancel with a vestry, organ chamber and south chapel, and a west tower. The tower has four stages, buttresses, a plinth, and a west doorway with a hood mould, above which is a four-light west window with a hood mould. In the third stage is a ledge with a statue under a crocketed canopy, over which are two-light bell openings, a corbel table, and an embattled parapet with crocketed pinnacles.
49 Commercial Street; 54.13247°N 0.78568°W		1912	A shop with a flat above, in red brick on the front, glazed tile on the shopfront, variegated brick on the sides, with sandstone dressings, an egg and dart eaves course, and a slate roof with perforated ridge tiles. There are two storeys and two bays. The shopfront, which is flanked by doorways with fanlights, has a central doorway flanked by plate glass windows. The shopfront has decorated pilasters, a lettered frieze, a dentilled entablature, and an open pediment with a bull's head in the tympanum. The doorway has ionic pilasters on pedestals, and a segmental-arched fanlight with a keystone. The upper floor contains paired sash windows, between which is a datestone.
