= Norton College =

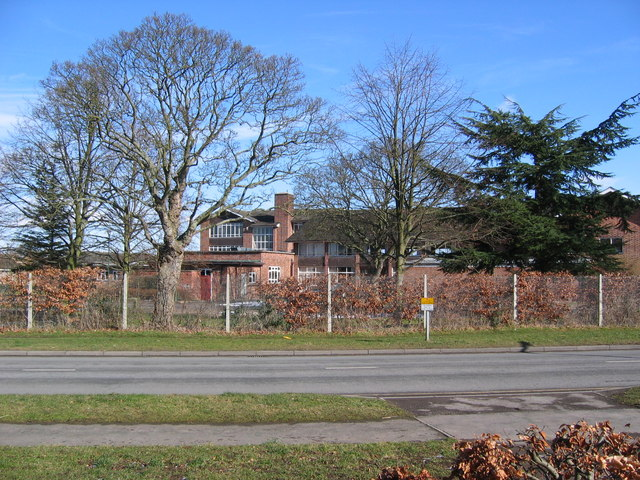

Location
- Langton Road; Norton-on-Derwent, North Yorkshire, YO17 9PT; England; 54.1256°N 0.7828°W

Information
- Type: Academy
- Established: 1963
- Department for Education URN: 136728 Tables
- Ofsted: Reports
- Head of school: Sam Stones
- Enrolment: 781
- Academy Trust: Arete Learning Trust
- Website: https://www.nortoncollege-rlt.co.uk/

Norton College is a mixed secondary school, sixth form and specialist humanities college with academy status in Norton, North Yorkshire, England. There are approximately 801 children on roll.

The school was inspected by Ofsted in November 2007 and received a Grade 1 (outstanding) assessment. In May 2009 the school was described as one of the most successful schools in the country. It was named in the report Data driven school transformation, published by the Specialist Schools and Academies Trust.

At the beginning of 2011 the status of Norton College was redesignated as Grade 1 in a remote inspection by Ofsted, following a subject inspection in November 2010. In May 2011 the College gained academy status under the multi-school model. The resulting trust is the 'Evolution Schools Learning Trust,' with Norton College retaining its name.

Norton College was given a "room for improvement" rating from Ofsted in 2012 after GCSE and A level results fell dramatically.

The College was inspected in October 2013 and rated Grade 2 (good) in all categories. The inspection team reported that the College had improved in all areas, particularly in GCSE results.

Norton College was also given a short inspection on 20 September 2017 and continued to be good. It is said they have firmly embedded their culture of 'aspire'. This inspection also says that the quality of teaching and learning has improved. Its also reported that work needs to be done to ensure attendance rises.

== Notable alumni ==
Ryan Swain — English radio and events presenter, DJ, Skateboarder, motivational speaker. Attended Norton College.
