= Norton-on-Derwent =

Town and civil parish in North Yorkshire, England

Coordinates: 54°07′46″N 0°46′59″W

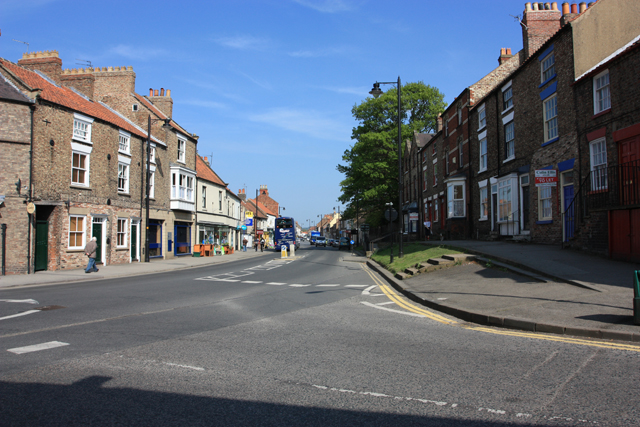
- Commercial Street, Norton

- Location within North Yorkshire
- Population: 7,387 (2011 Census)
- OS grid reference: SE 795 714
  - London: 150 mi (240 km) S
- Civil parish: Norton-on-Derwent
- Unitary authority: North Yorkshire
- Ceremonial county: North Yorkshire
- Region: Yorkshire and the Humber
- Country: England
- Sovereign state: United Kingdom
- Post town: MALTON
- Postcode district: YO17
- Dialling code: 01653
- Police: North Yorkshire
- Fire: North Yorkshire
- Ambulance: Yorkshire
- UK Parliament: Thirsk and Malton

Norton-on-Derwent, commonly referred to as simply Norton, is a town and civil parish in North Yorkshire, England. Norton borders the market town of Malton, and is separated from it by the River Derwent. The 2001 Census gave the population of the parish as 6,943, increasing at the 2011 Census to 7,387.

== History ==
The name Norton is derive from "north farmstead or village", being a settlement to the north of another.

In the Domesday Book Norton is listed three times, as "Nortone" in the Buckrose wapentake of the East Riding of Yorkshire.

At the foot of the bridge between Norton and Malton in the reign of Henry II was a hospital dedicated to St Nicholas, founded by Roger de Flamvill, and governed by the canons of Malton. In 1823 Norton was in the Wapentake of Buckrose and the East Riding of Yorkshire. Population at the time was 1017. Occupations included five farmers, one of whom was also a lime burner, two blacksmiths, four butchers, six grocers, five shoemakers, three tailors, two horse jockeys, a horse trainer, three raff merchants (dealers in lumber and odd refuse), two schoolmasters, a corn miller, saddler, stonemason, linen draper, cabinet maker, roper, gardener, fellmonger, wheelwright, overseer, and surgeon, and the landlords of The Bay Horse, and The Oak Tree public houses. Resident were fifteen members of the gentry.

== Governance ==
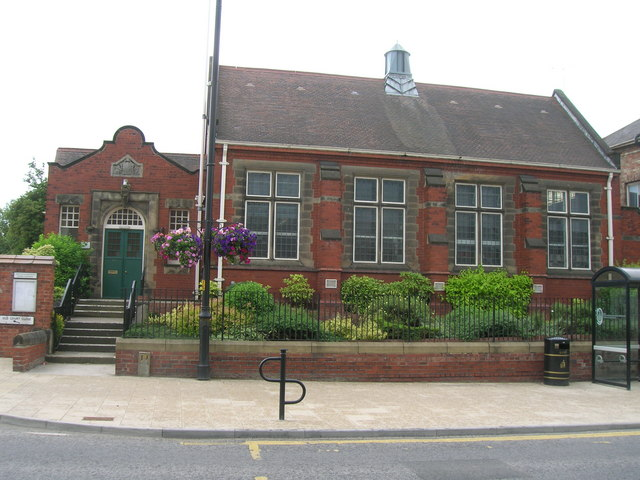
Old Courthouse, 84B Commercial Street: Town Council's headquarters

There are two tiers of local government covering Norton, at parish (town) and unitary authority level: Norton-on-Derwent Town Council and North Yorkshire Council. The town council is based at the Old Courthouse on Commercial Street.

Norton-on-Derwent is in the Thirsk and Malton Parliamentary constituency since its creation for the 2010 general election, and before this it was in the Ryedale constituency.

=== Administrative history ===
Norton was an ancient parish in the East Riding of Yorkshire. In 1832 the parish was included in the Malton parliamentary borough (constituency). The parliamentary borough of Malton was made a local board district in 1854, after which Norton was therefore governed as part of Malton.

This situation continued until 1889 when elected county councils were established under the Local Government Act 1888, which made each of Yorkshire's three ridings a separate administrative county. Local board districts which straddled county boundaries were placed in the county which had the majority of the population. The Malton district straddled the boundary between the North Riding and East Riding, with the boundary being the River Derwent. More of the district's population was north of the river at that time, and so Norton was transferred to the North Riding on 1 April 1889 when the new county councils came into being. A campaign to restore Norton to the East Riding led to the parish of Norton being removed from the Malton district, downgraded to a rural parish and transferred back to the East Riding on 29 September 1889.

In 1890 Norton was made its own local government district. Such districts were renamed urban districts in 1894.

Norton Urban District was abolished in 1974, with the area becoming part of the Ryedale district of North Yorkshire. A successor parish was created covering the former urban district. The successor parish created in 1974 was named "Norton-on-Derwent" whereas previously the official name had just been "Norton". It was part of the Ryedale district between 1974 and 2023. It is now administered by North Yorkshire Council.

== Community ==
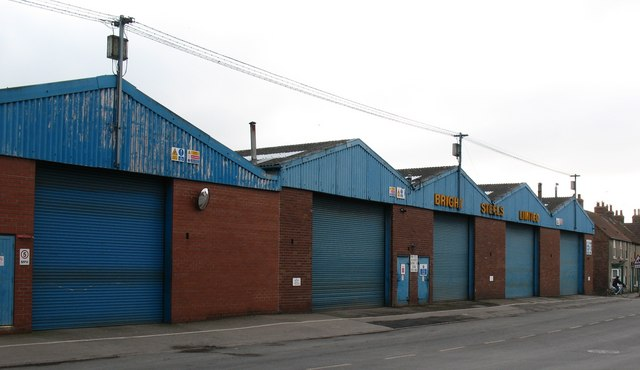
Bright Steels Ltd

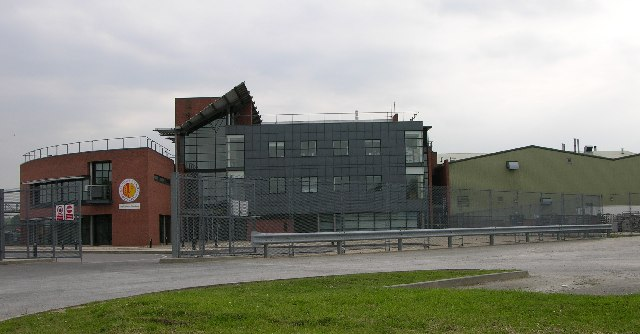
The Bacon factory

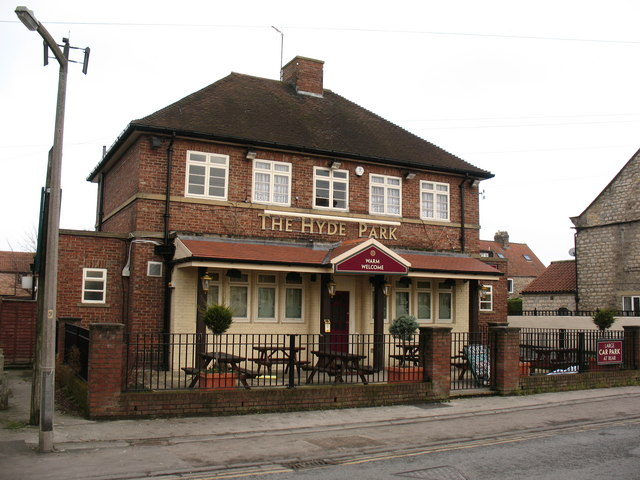
The Hyde Park, one of many pubs in Norton

Norton, with Malton, has significance within the horse racing industry because of the town's many stables.

Malton & Norton Golf Club is a 27-hole golf course located off Welham Road, covers a large part of the south-west end of the town. The club is the 'home club' of European Tour professional Simon Dyson.

Norton's schools are Norton Primary School, and Norton College secondary school. The secondary school has Academy and specialist Technology College status, a sixth form college and a playgroup.

Sport facilities include a swimming pool, a skate park, and Norton College sixth form gym, which is open to the public.

Malton Bacon Factory in Norton is a major employer for both Norton, Malton and the local area.

== Transport ==
Because of the town's close proximity to Malton, Norton has access to the A64, which runs from Leeds and York to Scarborough, and the A169 to Pickering and Whitby.

Both Malton bus station and Malton railway station are located in Norton.

Norton is home to Coastliner, a division of the Transdev bus group. Buses run from Leeds and York through Norton and Malton to Pickering, Whitby and Scarborough. There are also regular buses to Castle Howard and Hovingham, and other local bus routes.

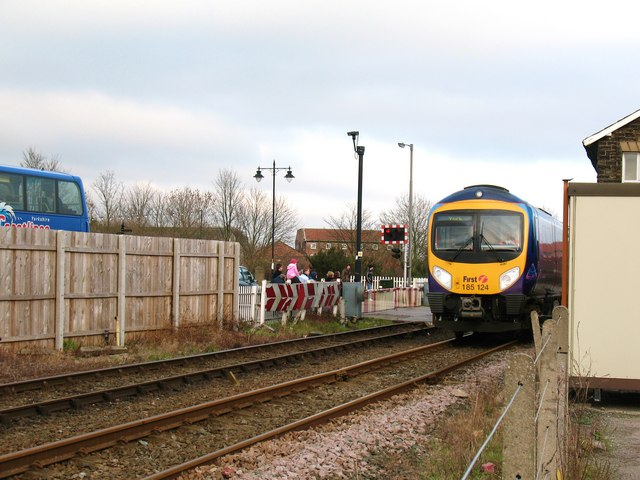
The Scarborough to Leeds Train, stopping at Malton station, then continuing to York

Malton railway station is on the TransPennine Express route, with fast trains every hour running from Scarborough to York, Leeds, Manchester and Liverpool. There are long term plans to re-open the rail link between Malton and Pickering, which would create a new service from Malton to Whitby. A preliminary feasibility study was published in July 2000, indicating that re-opening this section was technically possible.

== Media ==
The town is served by both BBC Yorkshire and BBC North East and Cumbria on BBC One & ITV Yorkshire and ITV Tyne Tees on ITV1. Television signals are received from either the Emley Moor or Bilsdale TV transmitters.

Local radio stations are BBC Radio York on 103.7 FM, Greatest Hits Radio York & North Yorkshire on 104.7 FM, and Coast & County Radio on 97.4 FM.

Local newspaper is served by the Gazette and Herald.

== Skatepark ==
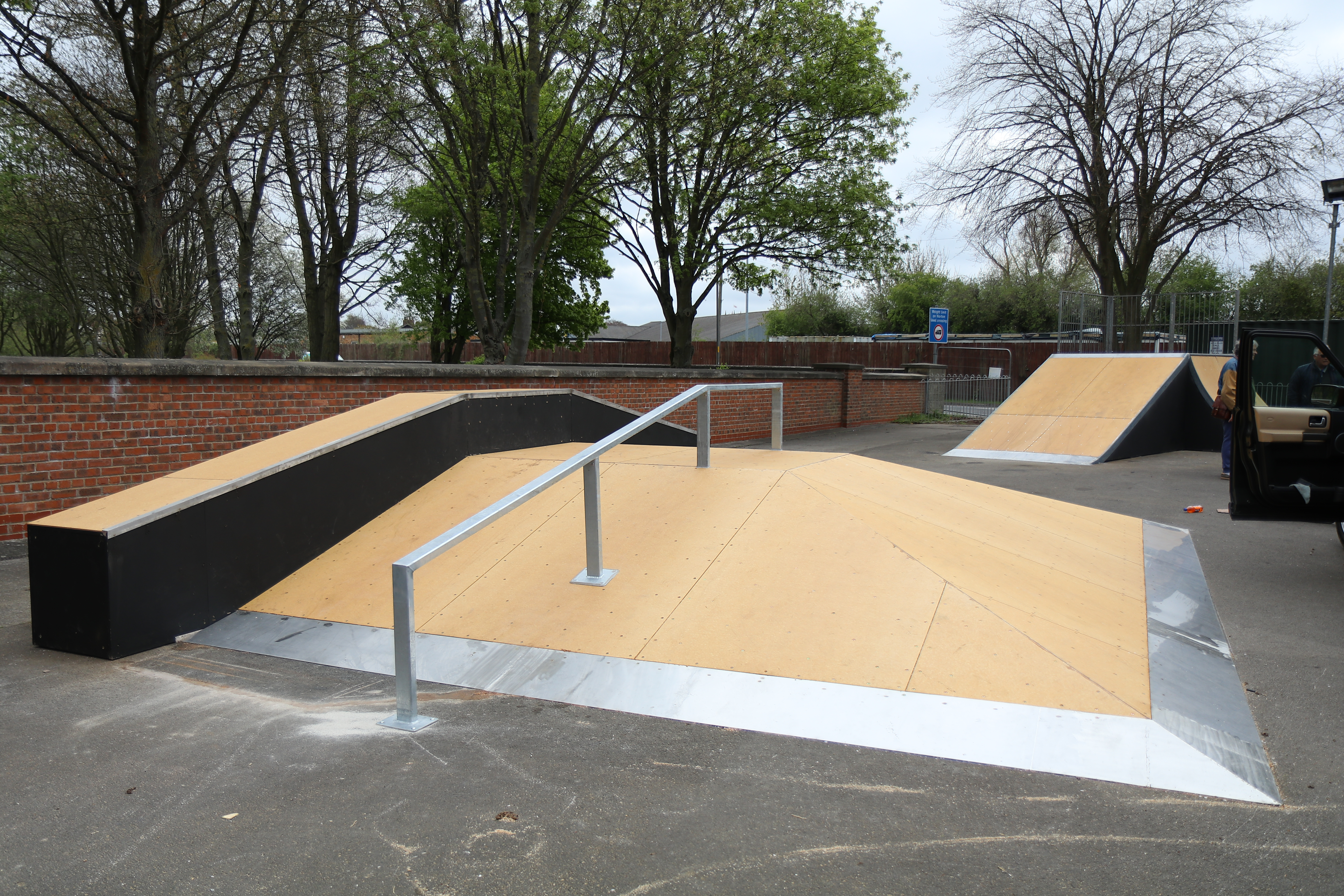
Norton Skatepark

=== Norton & Malton Skatepark ===
Norton & Malton Skatepark is located off Norton Road in North Yorkshire, England. The skatepark consists primarily of wooden ramps surfaced with Skatelite on a tarmac base and includes a freestanding half-pipe structure.

In 2021, local skateboarder and community campaigner Ryan Swain (presenter) launched the #RescueTheRamp campaign after the park’s half-pipe was closed due to safety concerns. The campaign sought support from local authorities and the wider skateboarding community to secure funding for restoration works.

The campaign attracted international attention and received public backing from professional skateboarder Tony Hawk, helping to raise awareness of the skatepark’s cultural and sporting significance.

Following an extended refurbishment programme, the skatepark was rebuilt and resurfaced by King Ramps, with Swain assisting during the restoration process. The works included the installation of new Skatelite riding surfaces and structural repairs, after which the park was deemed safe for public use.

The half-pipe, which originally opened in the early 2000s, is regarded as one of the last remaining free-to-use outdoor half-pipes of its type in the United Kingdom and one of a small number still available without charge nationwide.

A commemorative blue plaque was installed at the skatepark in memory of local BMX rider Tom Warrington, who was widely respected within the local action sports community.

== Arms ==
Coat of arms of Norton-on-Derwent

Notes
Granted to Norton Urban District Council on 20 September 1958. Transferred to the successor parish on 25 July 1978.
Crest
On a wreath of the colours upon a mount Vert a horse courant Sable mounted thereon a jockey habited Proper the shirt Green the sash belt and cap Ochre.
Escutcheon
Vert an eagle displayed Or beaked and membered Gules between in chief two roses Argent barbed and seeded Proper and in base a bezant on a chief Gold a ram's Head caboshed between two boars' hnneads couped all Sable armed Or langued Gules.
Motto
Providentia Proficiemus (By Foresight We Progress)

== See also ==
- Listed buildings in Norton-on-Derwent
