= Carlton Miniott =

Village and civil parish in North Yorkshire, England

Coordinates: 54°13′24″N 1°23′40″W

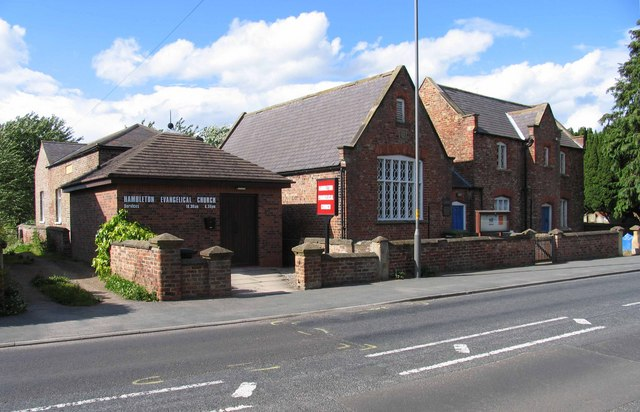
- Hambleton Evangelical Church and St Lawrence's Church Parish Rooms.

- Location within North Yorkshire
- Population: 990 (2011 census)
- OS grid reference: SE393808
- Unitary authority: North Yorkshire
- Ceremonial county: North Yorkshire
- Region: Yorkshire and the Humber
- Country: England
- Sovereign state: United Kingdom
- Post town: THIRSK
- Postcode district: YO7
- Dialling code: 01845
- Police: North Yorkshire
- Fire: North Yorkshire
- Ambulance: Yorkshire
- UK Parliament: Thirsk and Malton

Carlton Miniott, formerly Carlton Islebeck, is a village and civil parish in the county of North Yorkshire, England, on the A61 road to the immediate west of Thirsk, 25 miles (40 km) north of York. According to the 2001 census it had a population of 926, increasing to 990 at the 2011 census.

== History ==
The village is mentioned in the Domesday Book of 1086 as Carlton, as is the place-name Islebeck that has been associated with the village. The land was in the possession of Orm, son of Gamal at that time and passed on to Hugh, son of Baldric. It eventually became the property of the Barons de Mowbray. In the early 14th century the lands were purchased by a John Miniott from whom the village now gets its suffix. By the early 15th century the manor had passed out of the Miniott family to the Markenfield and Pigot families. Thereafter, the manor was further divided and passed through other families such as Metcalfe, Folkingham, Hussey, Lamplugh, Clough and Bell.

== Governance ==
The village is in the Thirsk and Malton UK Parliament constituency. From 1974 to 2023 it was part of the Hambleton District but is now administered by the unitary North Yorkshire Council. The parish council has seven councillors including the chair and meets monthly.

== Geography ==
Carlton Miniott is located on the A61, Leeds to Thirsk, road. The nearest settlements are Sowerby, 3 miles (4.8 km) to the east; Thirsk, 2 miles (3.2 km) to the east; Sandhutton 1 mile (1.6 km) to the north-west; Skipton-on-Swale 1.6 miles (2.6 km) to the south-west and RAF Topcliffe 1.34 miles (2.16 km) to the south.

Thirsk railway station is in the village. It is on the East Coast Main Line served by Grand Central trains to Sunderland and London King's Cross and TransPennine Express trains to Middlesbrough and Manchester Airport.

The village is served by bus services to and from Thirsk.

The soil in the area is a light gravel or sand laid over Keuper marl with some lower lias and alluvium also present.

The 1881 UK Census recorded the population at 380. According to the 2011 UK Census, the population was 962 living in 388 dwellings, of which 763 were over sixteen years old, and of those 507 were in employment.

== Village amenities ==
There is a Post Office situated to the east of the village. There is a playing field near the turn-off for Sandhutton which is cared for and run by a playing field committee. There are a number of public houses, a small holiday lodge site and a fishing lake.

== Education ==
There is a small school situated in on the west side of the village, previously Carlton Miniott Community Primary School, it is now named Carlton Miniott Primary Academy and is part of the Elevate Multi-Academy Trust. The school is within the catchment area for Thirsk School & Sixth Form College.

== Religion ==
On the west side of the village there are two churches, St Lawrence's Church and Hambleton Evangelical Church. St Lawrence's was rebuilt in 1896 with registers dating to 1706 and is a Grade II listed building. In 1838, a Methodist Chapel was built, but no longer functions as such.

== Notable residents ==
The novelist J. L. Carr was born on 20 May 1912 in one of the railway cottages at Thirsk Junction, between Carlton Miniott and Thirsk, where his father was stationmaster, and attended primary school in the village. Carr wrote:

"I scarcely can believe that from the age of five until we left Carlton Miniott when I was about eight, a better education could have been purchased. I wanted information, and it was provided. I preferred order, and there was order. I needed others to emulate, and they were there. I was learning all the time."

== See also ==
- Listed buildings in Carlton Miniott

== Gallery ==
Views of Carlton Miniott
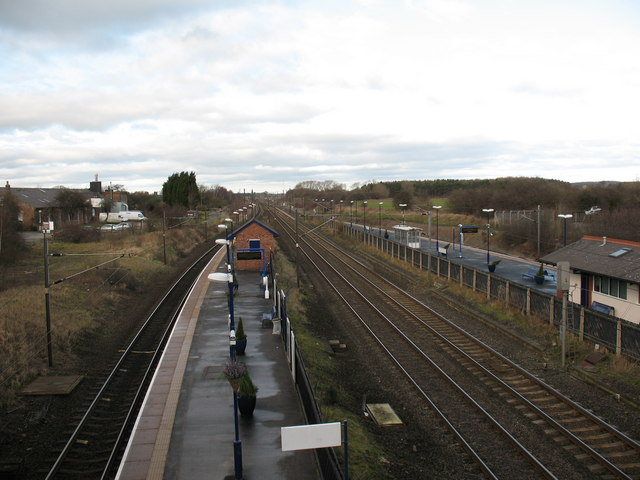
Thirsk railway station

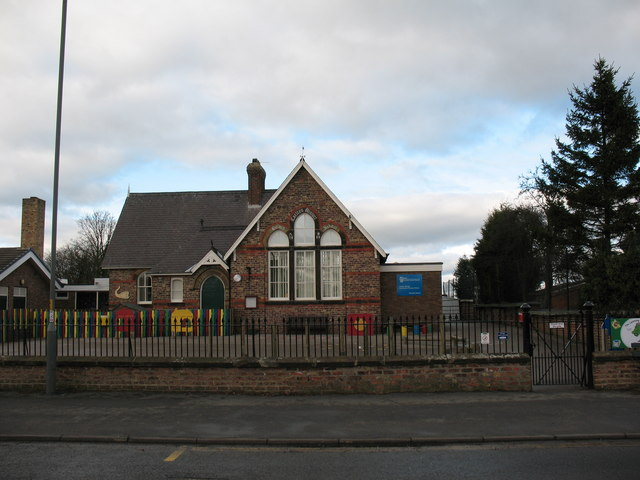
Carlton Miniott primary school

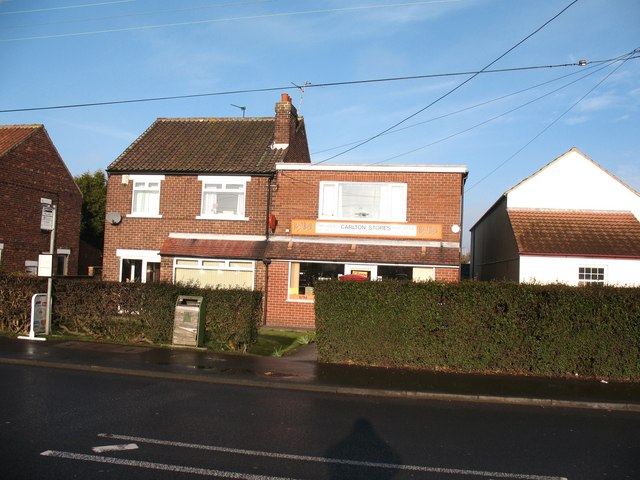
Carlton Miniott post office

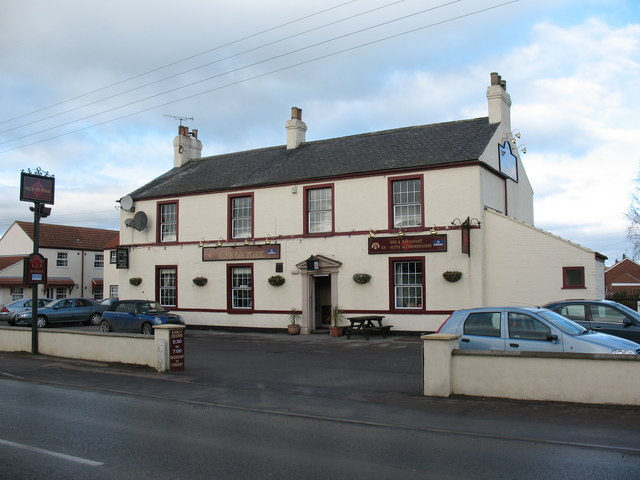
Vale of York public house, Carlton Miniott

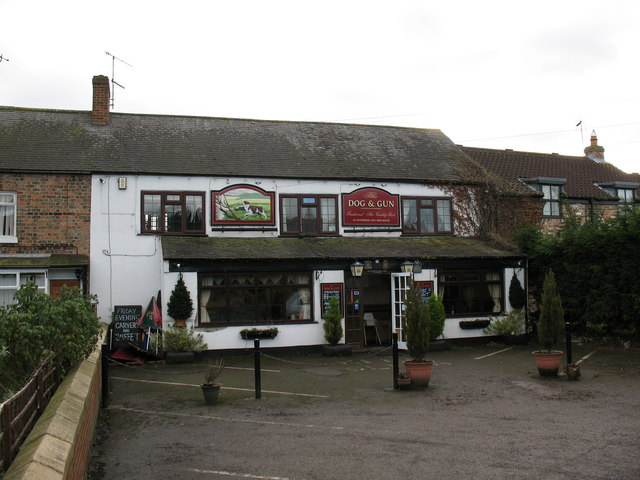
The Dog and Gun pub in Carlton Miniott

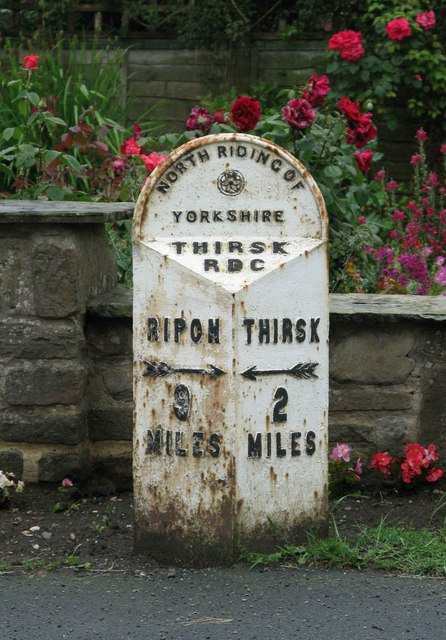
Thirsk Milepost at Carlton Miniott

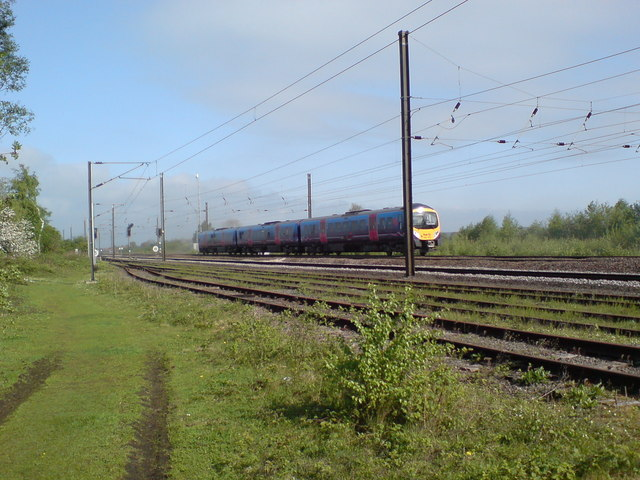
East Coast Main Line, taken from the track that runs up the eastern side of the works, north of Thirsk Station.
