= YO1 Radio =

Local Radio station in York and Selby, England

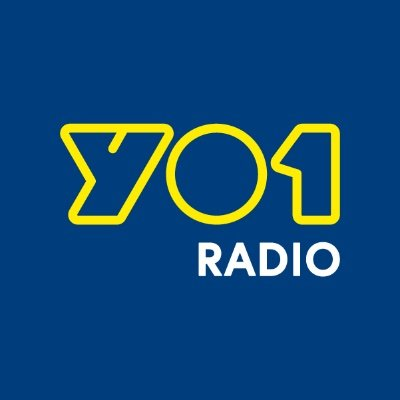

York; England
- Broadcast area: North Yorkshire
- Frequencies: FM: 102.8 MHz (York), 90.0 MHz (Selby); DAB: 8B (York SSDAB), 10C (North Yorkshire)
- RDS: YO1Radio

Programming
- Format: Freeform community radio

Ownership
- Owner: YO1 Radio Ltd

History
- Founded: 12 September 2017, as an internet station
- First air date: 27 August 2018

Technical information
- ERP: 100 watts (FM, York); 200 watts (FM, Selby)
- Transmitter coordinates: 53°59′11″N 1°05′57″W

Links
- Website: YO1 Radio

YO1 Radio is a community radio station based in York, England. It broadcasts local news, weather, travel and information alongside music from the 1980s to the present day. It broadcasts to the city of York on 102.8 MHz FM, in Selby on 90.0 MHz FM with transmissions areas in parts of North Yorkshire on DAB+. It takes its name from a district of the YO postcode area covering central York.

== History ==
YO1 Radio launched online on 12 September 2017.

In February 2018, Ofcom awarded YO1 Radio a community licence and the station launched and continues as a community radio station on 102.8 FM at midday on 27 August 2018.

In November 2020, YO1 Radio Limited appointed Wayne Anthony Chadwick as a director. Who was also named as a person of significant control on Companies House in March 2021.

In 2021, YO1 Radio opened its 'Live Lounge', a city centre studio on Goodramgate in York. The Live Lounge was used to broadcast some live programmes and interviews as an alternative to the station's main studios at James Street.

On 5 September 2022, YO1 Radio announced a collaboration with local newspaper The York Press. The partnership has been formed to bring listeners the latest local news from its editorial team.

In September 2021, YO1 Radio formed a partnership with York City Football Club. In November 2021, a deal was agreed with York City Knights RLFC for YO1 Radio to feature on the team shirts for the 2022 season. The shirt sponsorship was for the 2022/23 season and has now ended.

On 27 October 2022, York Barbican and YO1 Radio launched a media partnership.

In June 2023, YO1 Radio moved into a warehouse with purpose-built studios located at James Street, York, with a main on-air studio, smaller production studios and offices. The existing 'Live Lounge Studio' on Goodramgate was retained.

== Programming ==
YO1 Radio's weekday breakfast programme, Griffo in the Morning, is presented by former Minster FM presenter Paul Griffiths from 6 am.

Meanwhile, YO1 Radio's Content Controller and former BBC Radio York presenter Chris Marsden, hosts the drive show 'Chris Marsden's Home Run' from 4 pm.

Radio Station MD, Wayne Chadwick also presents a weekday afternoon show 2 pm – 4 pm.

In February 2023, local singer, actor, producer and dancer Claire Pulpher joined the station to present the weekday mid-morning programme. Claire Pulpher's programme has now moved to a lunchtime slot, making room for the addition of former BBC Radio York presenter Jonathan Cowap to the schedule.

Former BBC Radio York presenter, Jonathan Cowap, has joined YO1 Radio, to present a daily show, weekday mornings from 10 am. Jonathan was a regular voice at the BBC for 38 years, including 34 years on-air in York.

== Critical reception ==
In February 2023, The Guardian columnist Emma Beddington described YO1 Radio as: "The only acceptable compromise we've found [...], a local station playing 80s and 90s bangers with mercifully little talking, but [...] still a poor cousin to silence".

== Transmission ==
The station transmits on 102.8 FM from a transmitter site at York Hospital. Since July 2021, YO1 Radio has also been available on the MuxCo North Yorkshire DAB digital radio multiplex. Since 2018, YO1 Radio has also broadcast on 90.0 FM in Selby from Selby Abbey.

On 18 October 2022, York Digital Radio CIC, a non-profit company operated by YO1 Radio, was awarded a small-scale DAB radio licence which aims to cover almost all of the City of York and surrounding areas.

In March 2023, YO1 Radio applied to Ofcom for permission to further extend its FM coverage with the addition of a transmitter to serve the Thirsk area. No application has been granted as of June 2024.
