= YorkMix Radio =

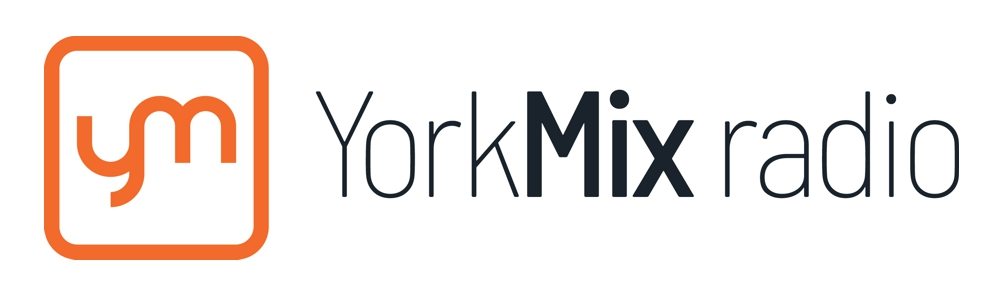
- York; England
- Broadcast area: North Yorkshire
- Frequency: DAB: 10C (MuxCo North Yorkshire)

Programming
- Format: Adult contemporary

Ownership
- Owner: York Sound Ltd

History
- First air date: 4 January 2021

Links
- Website: YorkMix Radio

YorkMix Radio is a British radio station broadcasting to the city of York. It was founded in early 2021, following the sale and subsequent re-branding of Minster FM as Greatest Hits Radio, and features a number of the presenters and staff who previously operated Minster FM. It is owned by YorkMix, who operate a local news website for the York area.

== History ==
Following the end of locally based programming on Minster FM, the operators of local news website YorkMix started a crowdfunding campaign to raise funds for a replacement local radio station. The station launched in November 2020 as XmasMix Radio playing Christmas-themed tracks before its full programming launch on 4 January 2021.

== Programming ==
YorkMix Radio features a mix of Adult Contemporary music through much of its broadcast day, alongside local news and features. The station also produces outside broadcasts from events within the area as well as for its commercial partners.

== Transmission ==
The station transmits on the MuxCo North Yorkshire DAB multiplex, covering most of the county of North Yorkshire.

== Notable presenters ==
- Ben Anderson
- Alex B Cann
- Laura Castle (Breakfast presenter)
- Victoria Charles
- Paul Clark
- Adam Coggin
- Leanne Dundass
- David Dunning (news presenter)
- Ben Fry
- David Green (Early Breakfast and MD)
- Tim Lichfield
- Simon Pattinson
- Paul Spence
- Chris Titley (news presenter)
- Michael Weadock
