= Skateboard GB =

Sports governing body for skateboarding in the UK

- Abbreviation: SBGB
- Formation: October 6, 2017; 8 years ago
- Purpose: Governing body for skateboarding in the UK
- Headquarters: Sheffield
- Chair: Alex Jordan
- CEO: James Hope-Gill
- Affiliations: British Olympic Association; UK Sport; Sport England; UK Anti-Doping; Skateboard Scotland; Skateboard England; Skateboard:NI
- Staff: 3
- Website: skateboardgb.org

Skateboard GB is the governing body for skateboarding in the UK and represents the home nations of England, Scotland, Wales and Northern Ireland at the National Olympic Committee.

== Funding ==
In December 2020 Skateboard GB was the recipient of a UK Sport grant of £1,672,485 for the Paris 2024 Olympics. The grant represents a significant increase from the £166,825 awarded by the UK government-backed Aspiration Fund in 2018 for the Tokyo 2020 Olympics.

In July 2020 founding chair Lucy Adams stepped down to spend more time with her family and was replaced by Alex Jordan.

== Team GB ==
Skateboard GB is responsible for selecting, preparing and managing the British Skateboarding Team which includes Sky Brown who was set to become Britain's youngest Olympian at the Tokyo 2020 Olympics. The other team members include Alex Decunha, Sam Beckett, Alex Hallford and Jordan Thackary, with Team Manager Darren Pearcy.

== Merger ==
In December 2020 it was announced that Skateboard GB and Skateboard England, the National Governing Body for skateboarding in England and Wales, would merge.

== See also ==
- Make Life Skate Life
