= C. Hodgson Fowler =

English ecclesiastical architect (1840–1910)

Charles Hodgson Fowler VD, FRIBA
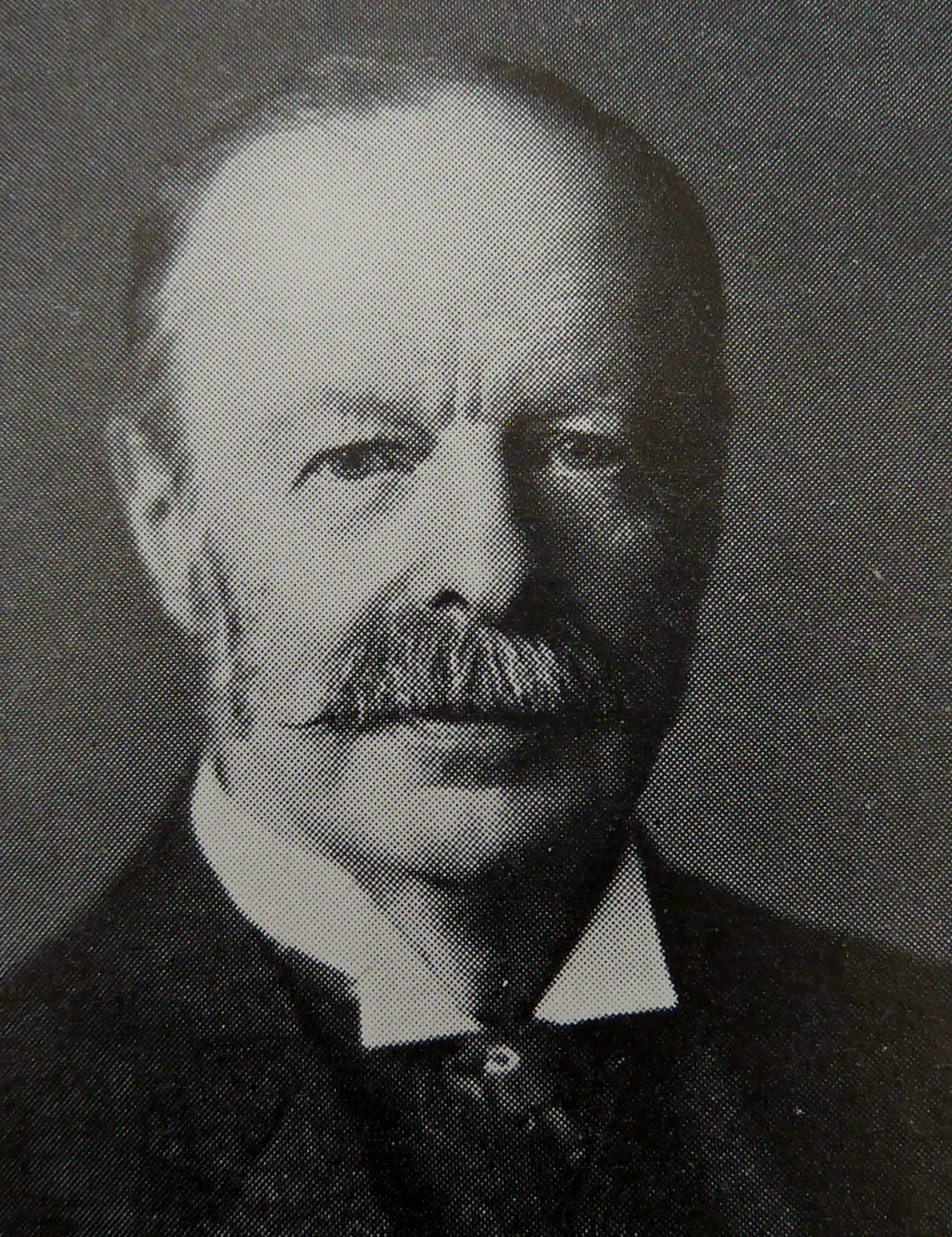
- Fowler, in 1906
- Born: 2 March 1840; Nottinghamshire, England
- Died: 14 December 1910 (aged 70)
- Occupation: Architect
- Spouse: Grace Florence Fowler

Charles Hodgson Fowler (2 March 1840 – 14 December 1910) was a prolific English ecclesiastical architect who specialised in building and, especially, restoring churches.

== Life ==
Fowler was born in Southwell, Nottinghamshire, the son of Robert Hodgson Fowler (1798–1858) the vicar of Holy Trinity Church, Rolleston and Frances Elizabeth Bish (1802–1872). On 14 September 1880 he married Grace Florence Hood, daughter of Reverend W. Frankland Hood of Nettleham Hall, Lincoln. (Note: Nettleham Hall burned down in 1937)

== Career ==
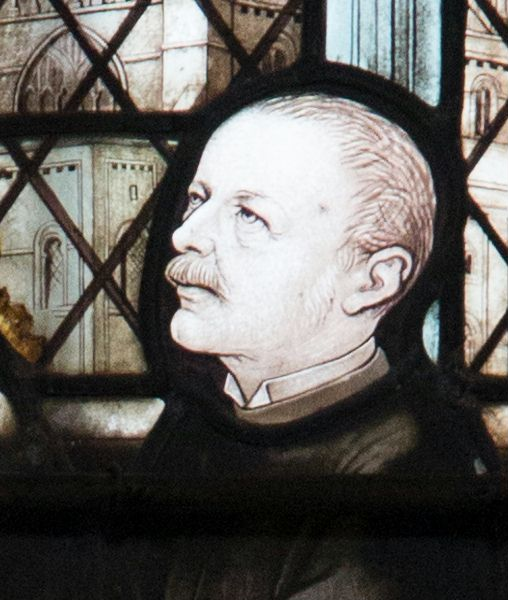
Depiction of Fowler, in St Oswald's Church, Durham

Fowler was educated in Southwell, at Berkhamsted School, and by private tutor. He gained an MA with honours at the University of Durham. In the early 1860s, following an apprenticeship with Sir George Gilbert Scott, Fowler commenced work in Pimlico, London, and became an Associate of the Royal Institute of British Architects (RIBA) in 1863. His proposers were Scott, E. W. Pugin and Matthew Digby Wyatt. In 1864, he moved to Durham, where he lived for the rest of his life.

Fowler's initial appointment in Durham was as Clerk of Works at Durham Cathedral in succession to E.R. Robson. At various times, he held the position of Architect to Rochester Cathedral and Lincoln Cathedral, and Architect to the Diocese of York and the Diocese of Lincoln. From 1885 to the time of his death, he was Architect to the Dean and Chapter of Durham, a post that had previously been held by Sir George Gilbert Scott.

Almost all of Fowler's work was done in four counties: County Durham, Yorkshire, Lincolnshire and Nottinghamshire.

== Associations ==
Fowler was a fellow of the Society of Antiquaries of London, and was elected a fellow of the Royal Institute of British Architects (RIBA) in 1917. He was a major of the Volunteer Force, and was awarded the Volunteer Officers' Decoration (VD).

== Designs ==
Although much of Fowler's work involved restoring and enlarging buildings, he was the architect of a number of new or rebuilt churches. A representative sample in a book on Victorian architecture and elsewhere is as follows:

- Holy Innocents, Tudhoe, County Durham (1866)
- St Ives, Leadgate, County Durham (1868)
- St Edmund, Bearpark, County Durham (1879)
- St Paul, West Hartlepool, County Durham (1885)
- St Barnabas, Middlesbrough, North Yorkshire (1888)
- St Peter's Church, Norton-on-Derwent, North Yorkshire (1894)
- Christ Church, Hepple, Northumberland (1897)
- St Alban, Ordsall, Retford, Nottinghamshire (1901)

Other notable churches by Fowler include:

- Church of St Philip and St James, Tow Law County Durham (1869)
- St Mary's Church, South Hylton, Sunderland (1880)
- St. Helen's Church, Grove, Nottinghamshire (1882)
- St Chad's Church, Great Habton, North Yorkshire (1884)
- St Lawrence's Church, Carlton Miniott (1896)
- St Andrew's Church, Bishopthorpe, City of York (1898–1902)
- St Mark's Church, Oldcotes (1900)
- All Saints' Church, Lincoln (1903)
- St Ambrose Church, Westbourne (1900)
- St Aidan's Church, Cleethorpes (1905-1906).

== Restorations ==
Among Fowler's restorations were the following:

- St Mary's Church, Clifton, Nottinghamshire (1874)
- St Wilfrid's Church, Kelham, Nottinghamshire (1874)
- St John's Church, Shildon, County Durham (1881–82, tower 1900)
- All Saints' Church, Northallerton (1882–1885)
- Holy Trinity Church, Acaster Malbis, North Yorkshire (1886)
- Church of St Peter at Gowts, Lincoln (1887) enlargement of the chancel
- All Hallows Church, Clixby, Lincolnshire (1889)
- Holy Trinity Church, Rolleston, Nottinghamshire (1889)
- St Mary's Church, Scawton, North Yorkshire (1892)
- St Peter and St Paul's Church, Upton, Newark and Southwell, Nottinghamshire (1893)
- All Saints' Church, Strelley (1895)
- Church of St Mary the Virgin, Richmond, North Yorkshire (1897)
- St Peter, Langtoft, East Riding of Yorkshire (1900–1903)
- Holy Trinity Church, Micklegate, York (1900–1905)
- St Peter and St Paul's Church, Sturton-le-Steeple (1901–1902)
- St Mary, Fridaythorpe, East Riding of Yorkshire (1902–1903)
- St Peter's Church, Snelston Derbyshire (1906–1907)
- St Leonard's Church, Malton, North Yorkshire (1907)
- St Hilda, Sherburn, North Yorkshire (1909–1913)

== Reordering ==
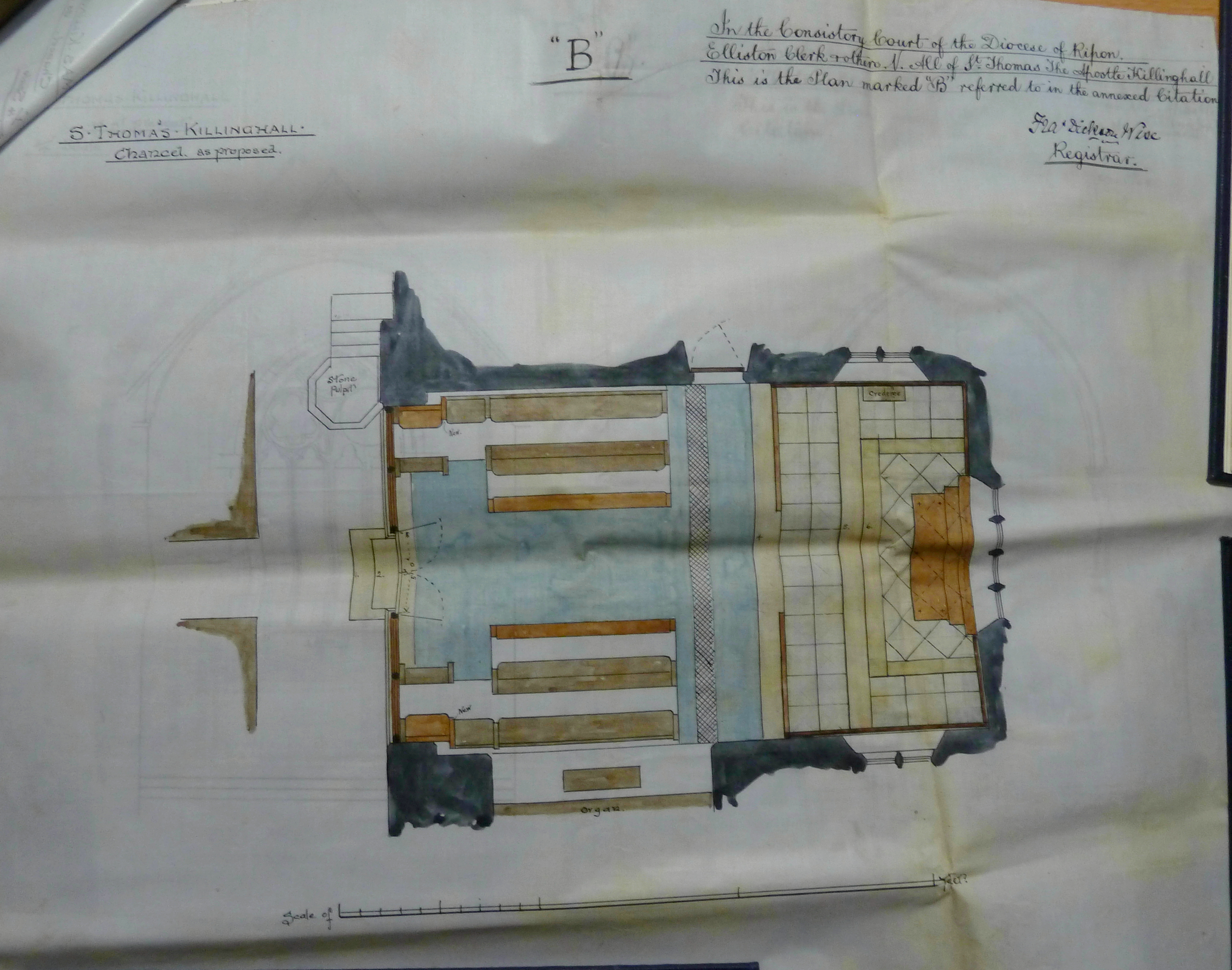
The architect's plan of the chancel of Killinghall church, 1905

- Church of St Thomas the Apostle, Killinghall (1905–1908) reordering of chancel in this 1880 building
- Church of All Saints, Winterton, Lincolnshire (1903–1904)

== Opinions on Fowler's work ==
The introductions to some of the volumes in the Buildings of England series offer a range of opinions on the merits of Fowler's restorations and, sometimes, his new or rebuilt churches:

- "Charles Hodgson Fowler, clerk of works then architect to the Dean and Chapter [of Durham Cathedral], composed the usual red brick and lancet windows to great effect in his big town churches (St Paul, West Hartlepool 1885–6; St Ignatius, Hendon (Sunderland) 1889), and barn-like colliery ones (Bearpark 1877–9; Craghead 1914–21; Easington Colliery 1925–8). Between 1864 and 1895 he did a vast number of restorations, handling them sensitively but not slavishly (see the staircase at Ryton, 1886)."
- "From outside the county, C. H. Fowler ... also restored much, with a similar dead hand"
- "Hodgson Fowler was more sensitive [as a church restorer than Ewan Christian] (see also his new churches at Grove, 1882, St Alban Ordsall, 1901) ..."
- " ... C. Hodgson Fowler of Durham (who did an admirably tactful restoration at Scawton in 1892) ..."
- "C. Hodgson Fowler did some pleasant village churches (Burton Leonard, 1877–8; Bishop Monkton, 1878–9)"
