= Alne railway station =

Disused railway station in North Yorkshire, England

Alne
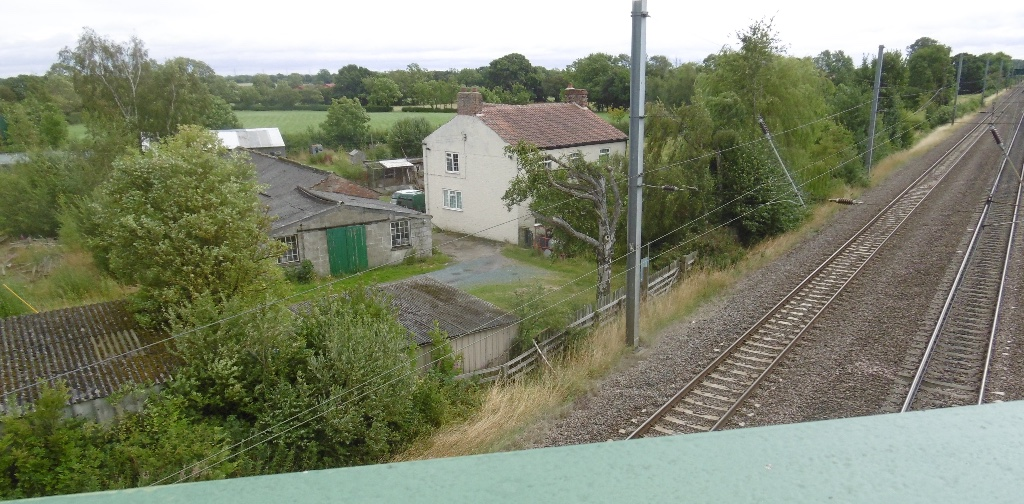
- Site of the station (2016)

General information
- Location: Alne, North Yorkshire; England
- Coordinates: 54.093430°N 1.231290°W
- Grid reference: SE503666
- Platforms: 3

Other information
- Status: Disused

History
- Original company: Great North of England Railway
- Pre-grouping: North Eastern Railway
- Post-grouping: London and North Eastern Railway

Key dates
- 31 March 1841: Station opens
- 5 May 1958: Station closed for passengers
- 10 August 1964: closed for goods
Location

Alne railway station was a station which served the village of Alne in the English county of North Yorkshire. It was served by trains on the main line between York and Thirsk. From 1891 to 1957 it was the junction of the Easingwold Railway which connected the main line to the town of Easingwold. The station was 11 miles 14 chains (18 km) north of York Station.

== History ==
Opened by the Great North of England Railway. It became part of the London and North Eastern Railway during the Grouping of 1923, passing on to the Eastern Region of British Railways during the nationalisation of 1948. It was then closed by the British Transport Commission.

In 1930, a third track was added at Alne and in 1959 fourth track was laid down. The station buildings were demolished in 1964 and since then, the line between York and Northallerton has been four tracks – two up lines and two down lines.

Bradshaws Railway Timetable of 1922 indicates that there were eight trains per day in each direction on the Easingwold line.

== Accident ==
- In 1877 the boiler of a locomotive exploded whilst it was hauling a freight train. Fragments were thrown up to 539 feet (164 m) away.

== The site today ==
Trains still pass at speed on the now electrified East Coast Main Line. Electrification was completed between York and Newcastle in 1990.

Preceding station	Historical railways	Following station
Tollerton; Line open, station closed	North Eastern Railway; East Coast Main Line	Raskelf; Line open, station closed
Terminus	Easingwold Railway	Easingwold; Line and station closed
