= Staveley, North Yorkshire =

Village and civil parish in North Yorkshire, England

Coordinates: 54°03′33″N 1°26′35″W

Staveley
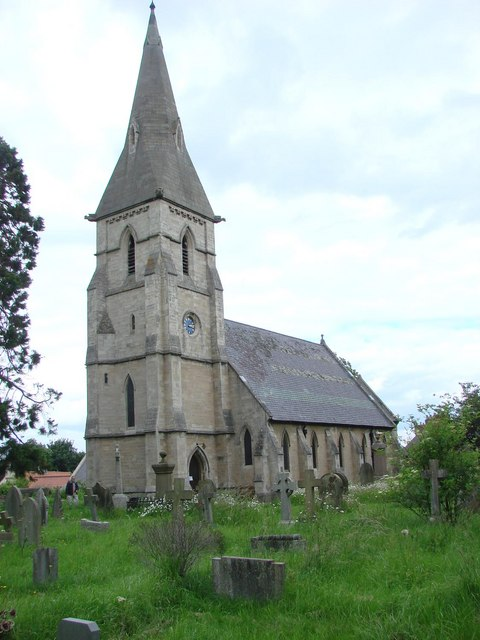
- All Saints Church, Staveley

- Location within North Yorkshire
- Population: 450 (2011 census)
- OS grid reference: SE366627
- Civil parish: Staveley
- Unitary authority: North Yorkshire
- Ceremonial county: North Yorkshire
- Region: Yorkshire and the Humber
- Country: England
- Sovereign state: United Kingdom
- Post town: KNARESBOROUGH
- Postcode district: HG5
- Police: North Yorkshire
- Fire: North Yorkshire
- Ambulance: Yorkshire

Staveley is a village and civil parish in the county of North Yorkshire, England. It is situated 4 miles (6.4 km) north of Knaresborough and near the A1(M) motorway. In the 2001 census, the village had a population of 444, which had risen to 450 by the time of the 2011 census. In 2015, North Yorkshire County Council estimated the population to have dropped to 440.

== History ==
The village is mentioned in the Domesday Book as belonging to Gospatric. The name Staveley is Anglo-Saxon and means the clearing where the staves were brought from.

The racehorse Staveley, winner of the 1805 St Leger Stakes, was born at nearby Boroughbridge.

The village used to have a railway station on the now disused Pilmoor, Boroughbridge and Knaresborough Railway. When it opened, it was called Staveley, but from 1881 its name was taken from nearby Copgrove village to avoid confusion with Staveley in Derbyshire.

The grade II listed, All Saints' Church, Staveley, was built in 1864 and holds services twice-monthly. The church replaces an earlier structure which is believed to have existed since Medieval times.

Until 1974 it was part of the West Riding of Yorkshire. From 1974 to 2023 it was part of the Borough of Harrogate, it is now administered by the unitary North Yorkshire Council.

== Attractions ==
Staveley is home to many local attractions and has the following aspects:

- Staveley Community Primary School, rated 'good' in a 2015 Ofsted inspection.
- The Royal Oak pub.
- The railway line: abandoned for several years, it is now a significant feature of the landscape to the south east of the village.
- Nature reserve: A long walk that stretches beyond Staveley. The reserve has many wild and rare species of flower and wildlife.

== See also ==
- Listed buildings in Staveley, North Yorkshire
