= Raskelf railway station =

Disused railway station in North Yorkshire, England

Raskelf
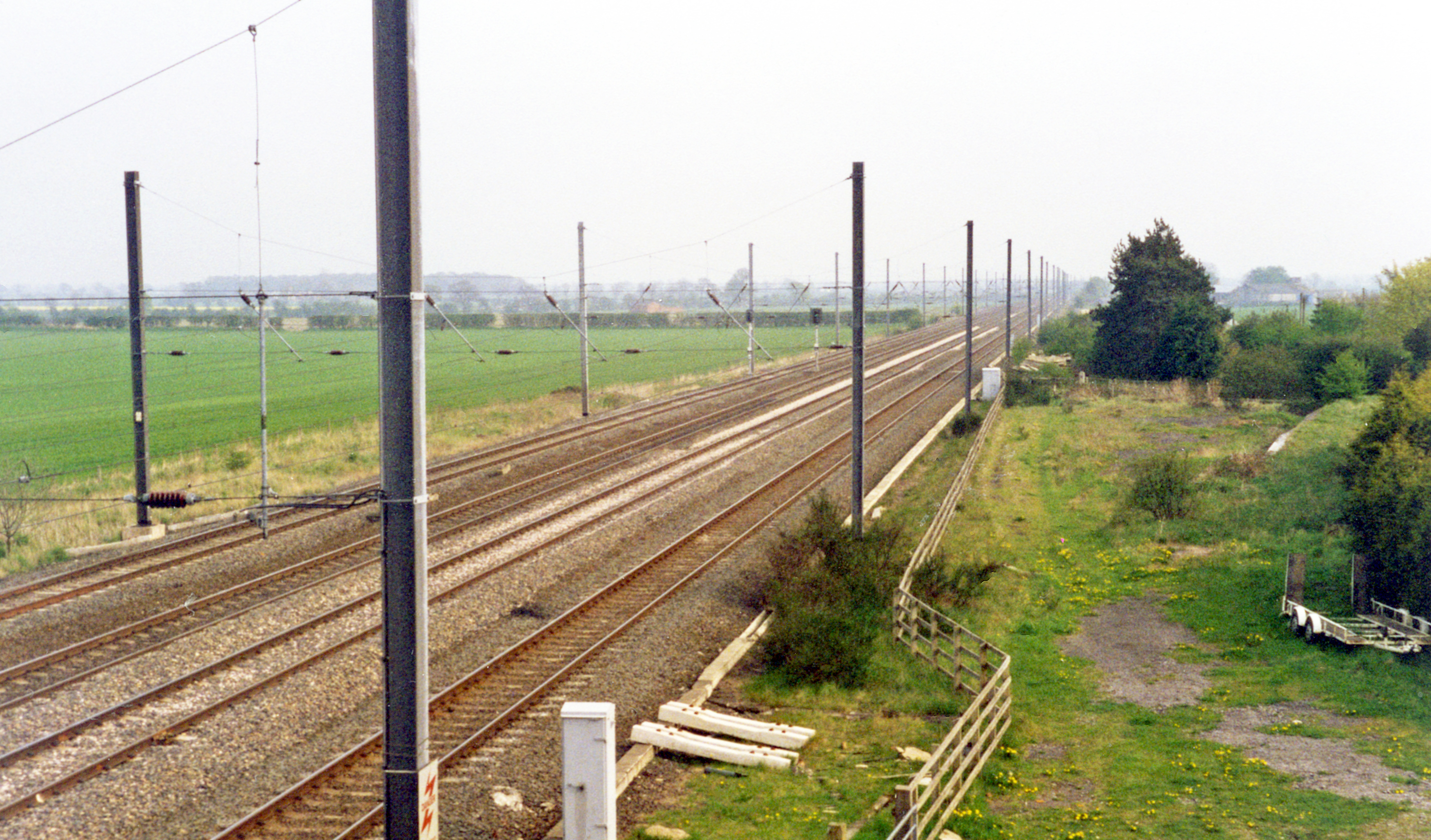
- Site of the former station in 1995

General information
- Location: Raskelf, North Yorkshire; England
- Coordinates: 54.1191°N 1.258°W
- Grid reference: SE486695
- Platforms: 2

Other information
- Status: Disused

History
- Original company: Great North of England Railway
- Pre-grouping: North Eastern Railway
- Post-grouping: LNER

Key dates
- 1 August 1841: Opened
- 5 May 1958: Closed to passengers
- 1964: Closed completely
Location

Raskelf railway station served the village of Raskelf, North Yorkshire, England from 1841 to 1964 on the East Coast Main Line.

== History ==
The station opened on 1 August 1841 by the Great North of England Railway. It was rebuilt in 1933 and was closed to passengers on 5 May 1958 and closed completely in 1964.

Preceding station	Historical railways	Following station
Alne; Line open, station closed	Great North of England Railway; East Coast Main Line	Pilmoor; Line open, station closed
Alne; Line open, station closed	North Eastern Railway; Thirsk and Malton Line	Husthwaite Gate; Line and station closed
