= Raskelf Pinfold =

Building in Raskelf, North Yorkshire, England

Coordinates: 54°07′58″N 1°14′55″W

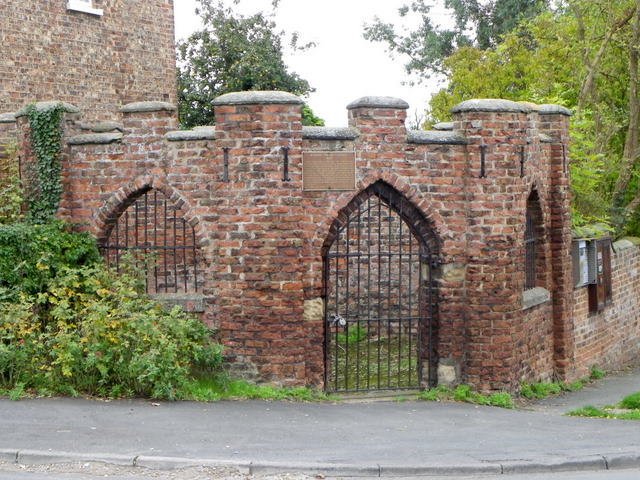
The building, in 2010

Raskelf Pinfold is a historic structure in Raskelf, a village in North Yorkshire, in England.

Pinfolds were common features of English villages before the passing of the inclosure acts. The pinfold in Raskelf was probably built in the late 18th century. R. J. Brown described it as "the most unusual one to survive" in England. It is in the Gothick style and was restored in the 1970s; Paul Chrystal and Simon Crossley praise the standard of the restoration. The building was grade II listed in 1984.

The pound is built of reddish-brown brick with stone coping, and has a cobbled floor with a central drain. It has an octagonal plan, and it has an embattled parapet with angle piers. It has an arched entrance and two arched openings, with iron gates and bars. The walls are 10 feet (3.0 m) high.

== See also ==
- Listed buildings in Raskelf
