= Tollerton railway station =

Disused railway station in North Yorkshire, England

Tollerton
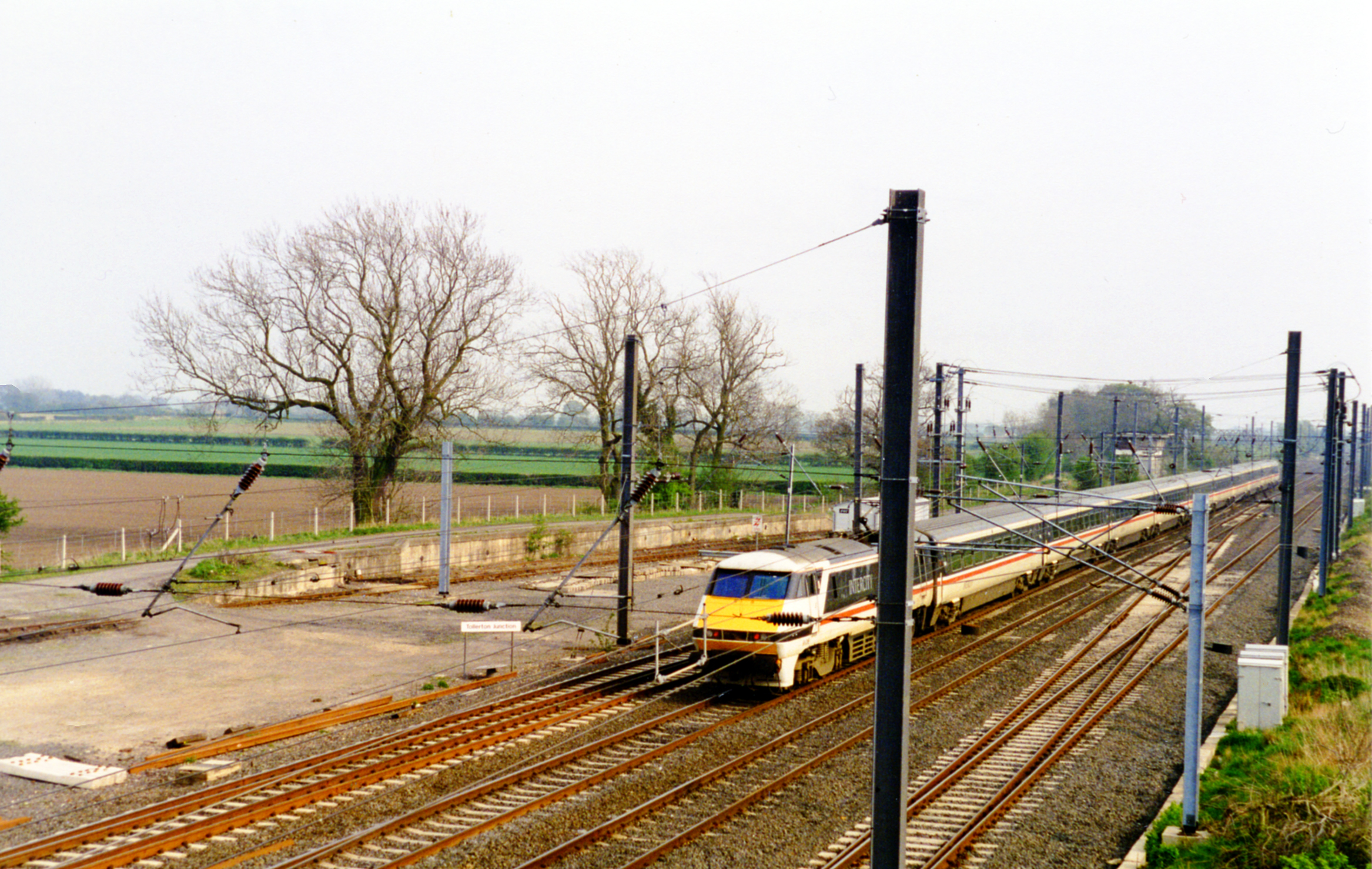
- Site of the station (1995)

General information
- Location: Tollerton, Yorkshire; England
- Coordinates: 54.0744°N 1.2147°W
- Grid reference: SE514645
- Platforms: 2

Other information
- Status: Disused

History
- Original company: Great North of England Railway
- Pre-grouping: North Eastern Railway
- Post-grouping: British Rail (North Eastern)

Key dates
- 1 August 1841: First site of station opened
- 1894: First site of station closed
- 1899: Second site of station opened
- 1 November 1965: Closed
Location

Tollerton railway station served the village of Tollerton, Yorkshire, England from 1841 to 1965 on the East Coast Main Line.

== History ==
The station was opened on 1 August 1841 by the Great North of England Railway. The first site of the station was situated southeast of Sykes Lane Bridge and the second site was situated northwest of Sykes Lane Bridge. A goods yard was provided to the northwest end of the old sidings. In 1937, Tollerton's services were reduced significantly to the point that there were no feasible provisions for people commuting from work in York. Sunday services ceased in 1943. Another passenger service from York to Pickering ceased on 2 February 1952, leaving only two services on the timetable; two morning services to and from Edinburgh. This station managed to survive the purge of stations on the main line north of York in 1958, the reason for this being unclear. It was later closed on 1 November 1965, to both passengers and goods traffic.

== Accidents and incidents ==
On 4 June 1950, a passenger train was derailed near Tollerton due to buckling of the track in hot weather. Thirteen people were injured

Preceding station	Historical railways	Following station
Beningbrough; Line open, station closed	York, Newcastle and Berwick Railway; East Coast Main Line	Alne; Line open, station closed
