= Beningbrough railway station =

Disused railway station in Beningbrough, North Yorkshire, England

Beningbrough
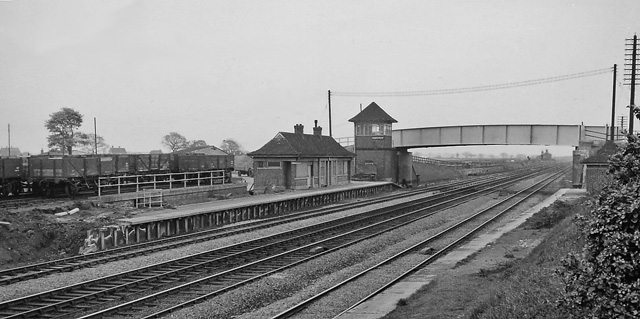
- The station in 1961

General information
- Location: Beningbrough, North Yorkshire; England
- Coordinates: 54.0205°N 1.1666°W
- Grid reference: SE547586
- Platforms: 2

Other information
- Status: Disused

History
- Original company: Great North of England Railway
- Pre-grouping: North Eastern Railway
- Post-grouping: London and North Eastern Railway

Key dates
- 31 March 1841: Opened as Shipton
- 1 December 1898: Name changed to Beningbrough
- 15 September 1958: Closed to passengers
- 1965: Closed completely
Location

Beningbrough railway station was on the East Coast Main Line that served the villages of Shipton-by-Beningbrough and Beningbrough, North Yorkshire, England from 1841 to 1965.

== History ==
The station was opened as Shipton on 31 March 1841 by the Great North of England Railway. The station's name was changed to Beningbrough on 1 December 1898. It was closed to passengers on 15 September 1958 and closed to goods traffic in 1965. A fragment of the southbound platform remains.

Preceding station	Historical railways	Following station
York; Line and station open	Great North of England Railway; East Coast Main Line	Tollerton; Line open, station closed
