= Pilmoor railway station =

Disused railway station in North Yorkshire, England

Pilmoor
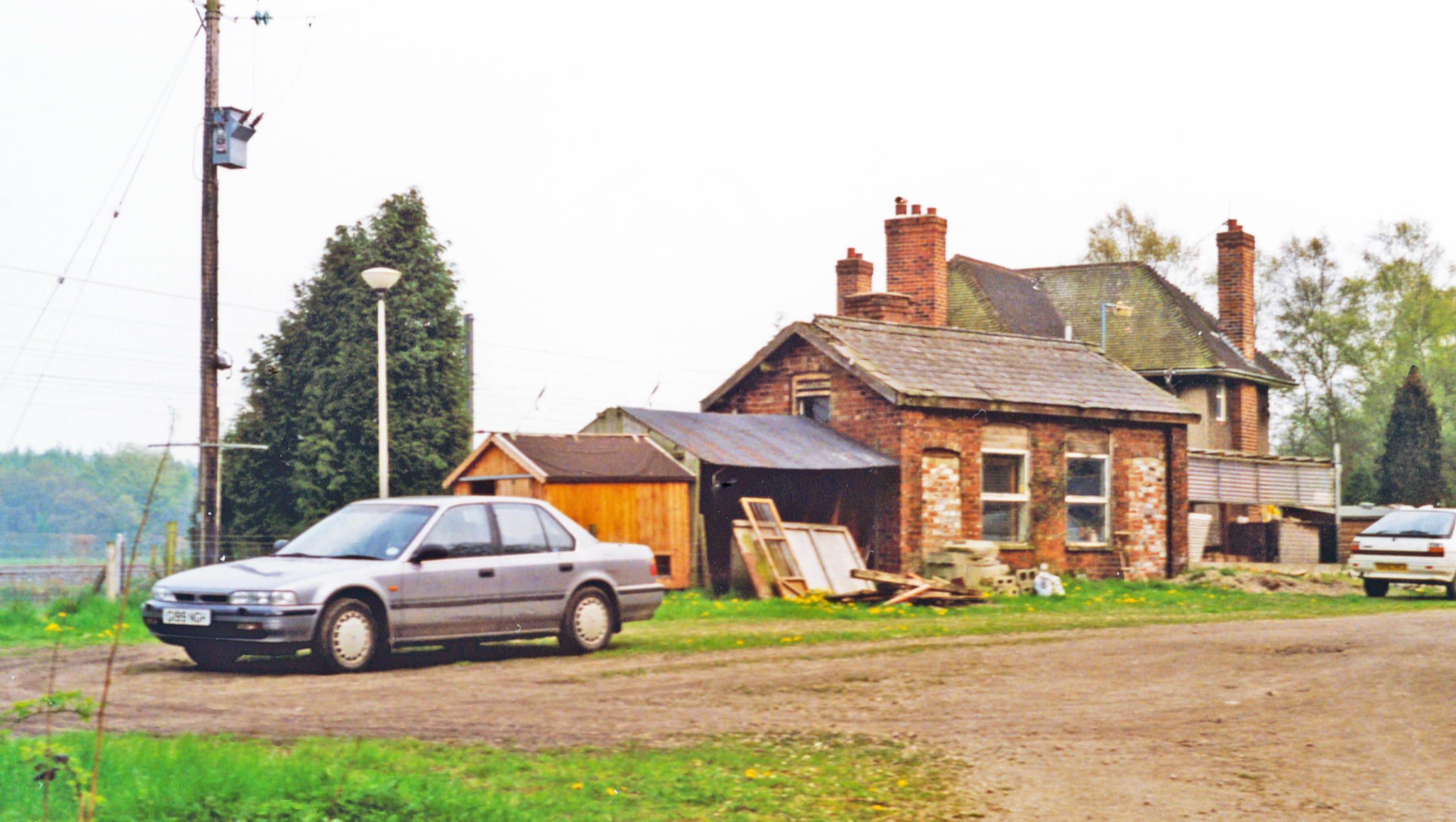
- Former station master's house with outbuildings, used as a farmhouse (1995)

General information
- Location: Sessay, North Yorkshire; England
- Coordinates: 54.1534°N 1.2941°W
- Grid reference: SE462733
- Platforms: 3

Other information
- Status: Disused

History
- Original company: East and West Yorkshire Junction Railway
- Pre-grouping: East and West Yorkshire Junction Railway; North Eastern Railway
- Post-grouping: LNER

Key dates
- 20 September 1847: Opened
- 5 May 1958: Closed
Location

Pilmoor railway station was in North Yorkshire, England, from 1847 to 1958, at the junction of the Great North of England Railway and the Pilmoor, Boroughbridge and Knaresborough Railway, about 6 miles (10 km) south-southeast of Thirsk at the southern edge of the civil parish of Sessay. The scattered settlement of Pilmoor (in the civil parish of Brafferton), from which its name was derived, is located southwest of it.

== History ==
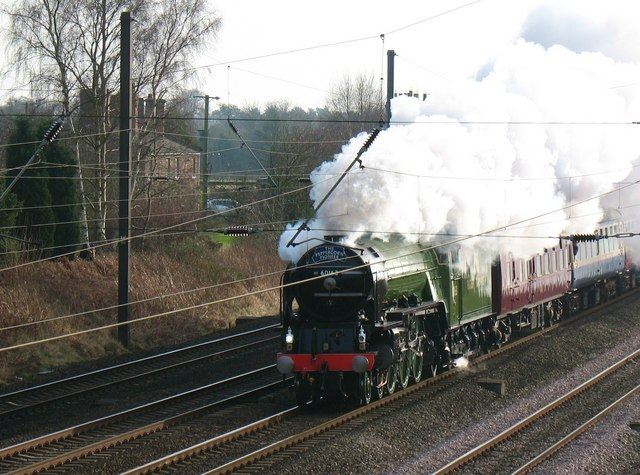
Train passing the railwaymen's cottages south of the former station

The station opened on 20 September 1847 by the East and West Yorkshire Junction Railway as the junction station for its branch line to Boroughbridge with the main York to Darlington line. It was unusual in not having an access road when first constructed, due to it being purely an exchange station rather than one serving a local community. The branch to Boroughbridge was extended through to Knaresborough in 1875, by which time Pilmoor was also served by trains on the Gilling and Pickering line to and from York. There was also a junction on the Pilmoor to Knaresborough line about 1 mile (1.6 km) southwest of the station from which a connecting track ran approximately east, crossing over the East Coast Main Line and joining the Thirsk and Malton Line about 0.7 miles (1.1 km) from Sunbeck Junction. This connecting line was never opened but was used as a site for eyesight tests up until the 1960s.

The station was rebuilt during the Second World War in 1942, when the main line was widened to 4 tracks north towards Thirsk. A new main building and station master's house was provided as part of this work.

The station was closed to both passengers and goods traffic on 5 May 1958, eight years after the branch line to Knaresborough closed to all traffic and five years after the Pickering route also lost its passenger trains.

Preceding station	Historical railways	Following station
Terminus	East and West Yorkshire Junction Railway; Pilmoor, Boroughbridge and Knaresborough Railway	Brafferton; Line and station closed
Raskelf; Line open, station closed	North Eastern Railway; East Coast Main Line	Sessay; Line open, station closed
Husthwaite Gate; Line and station closed	North Eastern Railway; Thirsk and Malton Line	Sessay; Line open, station closed
