= Sessay railway station =

Disused railway station in North Yorkshire, England

Sessay
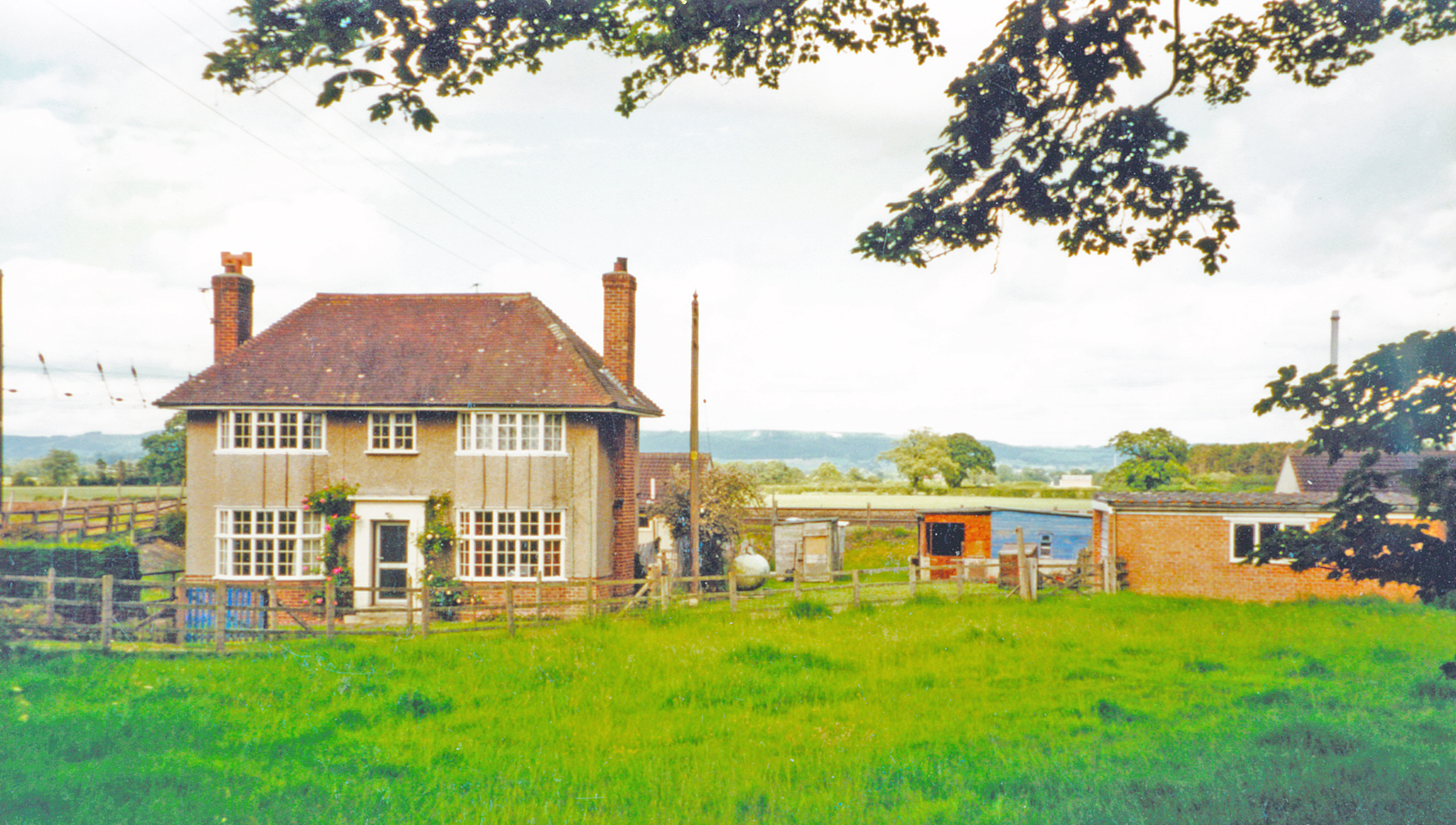
- Site of the station in 2002

General information
- Location: Sessay, North Yorkshire; England
- Coordinates: 54.1779°N 1.3182°W
- Grid reference: SE446760
- Platforms: 2

Other information
- Status: Disused

History
- Original company: Great North of England Railway
- Pre-grouping: North Eastern Railway
- Post-grouping: LNER

Key dates
- 1 August 1841: Opened
- 15 September 1958: Closed to passengers
- 10 August 1964: Closed completely
Location

Sessay railway station served the village of Sessay, North Yorkshire, England from 1841 to 1964 on the East Coast Main Line.

== History ==
The Sessay railway station opened on 1 August 1841 by the Great North of England Railway. The station was rebuilt from 1942 during the widening of the railway line in World War II, completed in May 1943. It was closed to passengers from 15 September 1958 and closed completely from 10 August 1964.

Preceding station	Historical railways	Following station
Pilmoor; Line open, station closed	North Eastern Railway; East Coast Main Line	Thirsk; Line and station open
