= Listed buildings in Copgrove =

Copgrove is a civil parish in the county of North Yorkshire, England. It contains five listed buildings that are recorded in the National Heritage List for England. Of these, one is listed at Grade II*, the middle of the three grades, and the others are at Grade II, the lowest grade. There are no settlements in the parish, and the most important building in Cosgrove Hall. This is listed, together with its lodge and associated structures, and the other listed buildings are a church and a bridge.

== Key ==
Grade	Criteria
II*	Particularly important buildings of more than special interest
II	Buildings of national importance and special interest

== Buildings ==
Name and location	Photograph	Date	Notes	Grade
St Michael's Church; 54.06399°N 1.47228°W		12th century	The church has been altered and extended through the centuries, including a restoration in 1897–98 by C. Hodgson Fowler. It is built in limestone with a stone slate roof, and consists of a nave with a south porch, and a chancel with a north vestry. On the west gable is a bellcote with a segmental arch and a moulded pediment. In the chancel is a Norman window, the other chancel windows are Decorated or Perpendicular in style, and the nave windows date from the restoration.	II*
Copgrove Hall; 54.06529°N 1.47801°W		c. 1820	A country house in stone with a grey slate roof. There are two storeys and a basement, a square plan with fronts of five and seven bays, and two rear service wings with three and four storeys. The middle three bays of the east entrance front are recessed, and contain a single-storey portico with Tuscan columns in antis, and an entablature with a moulded cornice and a blocking course. The rear west front contains a central door with a fanlight, flanked by two-storey bow windows. The south front has seven bays, and contains a central segmental-arched Tuscan porch, double doorways with a fanlight, an entablature, a moulded cornice and a blocking course. All the windows are sashes.	II
Lodge House and yard 54.06254°N 1.47470°W		Early 19th century	The lodge at the entrance to the grounds of Copgrove Hall is in stone, with a floor band, a moulded eaves cornice and guttering, and a grey slate roof with moulded pediments on three gables. There are two storeys and two bays, the right bay projecting to form an L-shaped plan. The door and a window are under a porch with Tuscan columns, an entablature, a deep moulded eaves cornice and a blocking course. The windows are sashes in rectangular recesses. The yard wall on the west has flat coping.	II
Piers, walls and railings, Lodge House; 54.06264°N 1.47461°W		Early 19th century	The [piers are in stone. The gate piers are about 2.5 metres (8 ft 2 in) high, with recessed panels, a deep cornice and surmounted by an eagle. The curved flanking walls are in stone with gritstone coping, they contain piers with a cornice and a flat capstone, and have cast iron railings consisting of short standards with ball finials linked by two plain rails.	II
Fish Pond Bridge; 54.06205°N 1.47837°W		Mid 19th century	The bridge carries a road over the outlet of the fishpond of Copgrove Hall. It is in gritstone, and consists of three segmental arches flanked by pilasters. There is roll moulding at the level of the road, and the pilasters have rounded caps at the parapet, which has segmental coping. The walls end in drum terminals.	II
