= Pilmoor, Boroughbridge and Knaresborough Railway =

Disused railway line in Yorkshire, England

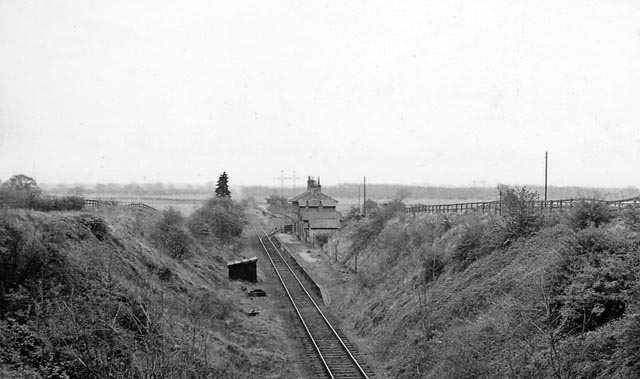
- Remains of Brafferton station in 1961

Overview
- Status: Closed
- Locale: North Yorkshire
- Termini: Knaresborough; Pilmoor Junction
- Stations: 3

Service
- Type: Heavy Rail
- Operator(s): North Eastern Railway; London North Eastern Railway; British Rail

History
- Opened: 1847
- Closed: 1964

Technical
- Line length: 14 miles (23 km) (1875–1950); 11 miles (18 km) (1950–1964)
- Number of tracks: 1
- Track gauge: 4 ft 8 1/2 in (1,435 mm)

The Pilmoor, Boroughbridge and Knaresborough Railway was a railway line in North Yorkshire, England, that connected Pilmoor on the East Coast Main Line with the towns of Boroughbridge and Knaresborough. The first part of the branch headed south-westwards from the East Coast Main Line and terminated at Boroughbridge. In 1875, the branch was extended again to meet the line at Knaresborough.

== Opening ==
The line originally ran only between Pilmoor and Boroughbridge from its opening in 1847 until 1875 when the section from Boroughbridge to Knaresborough opened. The original intent had been to link Boroughbridge, a coaching town on the Great North Road, with the main line between York and Darlington (what would become the East Coast Main Line [ECML]). The junction at Pilmoor had no road access, and was merely intended as an interchange point between the two lines.

When the extension line to Knaresborough was being surveyed, it was determined that there would not be enough clearance over the roads to Dishforth and Catterick Bridge, so a spur was built just north of Boroughbridge station which allowed the line the space to gain enough height to clear these roads. This necessitated moving Boroughbridge station onto the new formation. A planned connection over the East Coast Main Line between the Pilmoor, Boroughbridge and Knaresborough Railway and the Thirsk and Malton Line never opened, even though the embankments were built for the line and a bridge erected over the main line. The embankment later hosted its own signal array, which was used to test the eyesight of engine drivers. The bridge was demolished during the widening of the ECML in 1933.

During the Second World War, a rail connected depot for the Air Ministry was opened between Brafferton and Pilmoor. The section from Pilmoor to the Air Ministry siding was removed in 1953.

== Stations and services ==
The line had three intermediate stations, at Brafferton, Boroughbridge and Staveley. The station at Staveley was called Copgrove and Staveley on its opening in 1875. It was renamed Copgrove in 1881 after the nearby Copgrove village to avoid confusion with Staveley in Derbyshire. Though the line extended from Pilmoor to Knaresborough, most services worked from and to Harrogate. The line was 14 miles (23 km) long, but the distance between the two termini was 17 miles (27 km). (Note: Harrogate 0 miles, Starbeck 2.25 miles (3.62 km), Knaresborough 3.75 miles (6.04 km), Copgrove 7.5 miles (12.1 km), Boroughbridge 11 miles (18 km), Brafferton 14.5 miles (23.3 km), and Pilmoor 17 miles (27 km).)

The timetable for 1882, shows four out and back workings between Harrogate and Pilmoor, with one early morning service from Boroughbridge to Pilmoor, and a balance working of the last service of the day from Pilmoor terminating at Boroughbridge. The locomotive shed at Boroughbrige from the original terminating branch was retained in 1886 to accommodate the overnighting of the stock for the first and last trains of the day to and from Boroughbridge. By 1888, services were running at five per day along the whole line.

In 1910, services were five each way, with an extra mid-afternoon service between Harrogate and Boroughbridge. By 1950, like other rural lines in the area (the Thirsk and Malton being an example), the branch only saw two trains per day both ways, though services were more frequent on Saturdays, being bolstered to three per day.

== Closure ==
An attempt was made to cut costs in 1936, for the three to six trains a day, by replacing traditional signalling with staff and ticket at all stations. The line closed for passengers in 1950, with the branch being closed completely between Brafferton and Pilmoor, shortening it to 10 miles 821 yards (16.844 km), and a restricted speed of 25 miles per hour (40 km/h). Thereafter, trains were worked up and down the branch from Knaresborough only. Pilmoor station, by this time cut off from the branch, closed on 5 May 1958. The rest of the line was closed completely in 1964.
