= Thirsk railway station =

Railway station in North Yorkshire, England

Thirsk
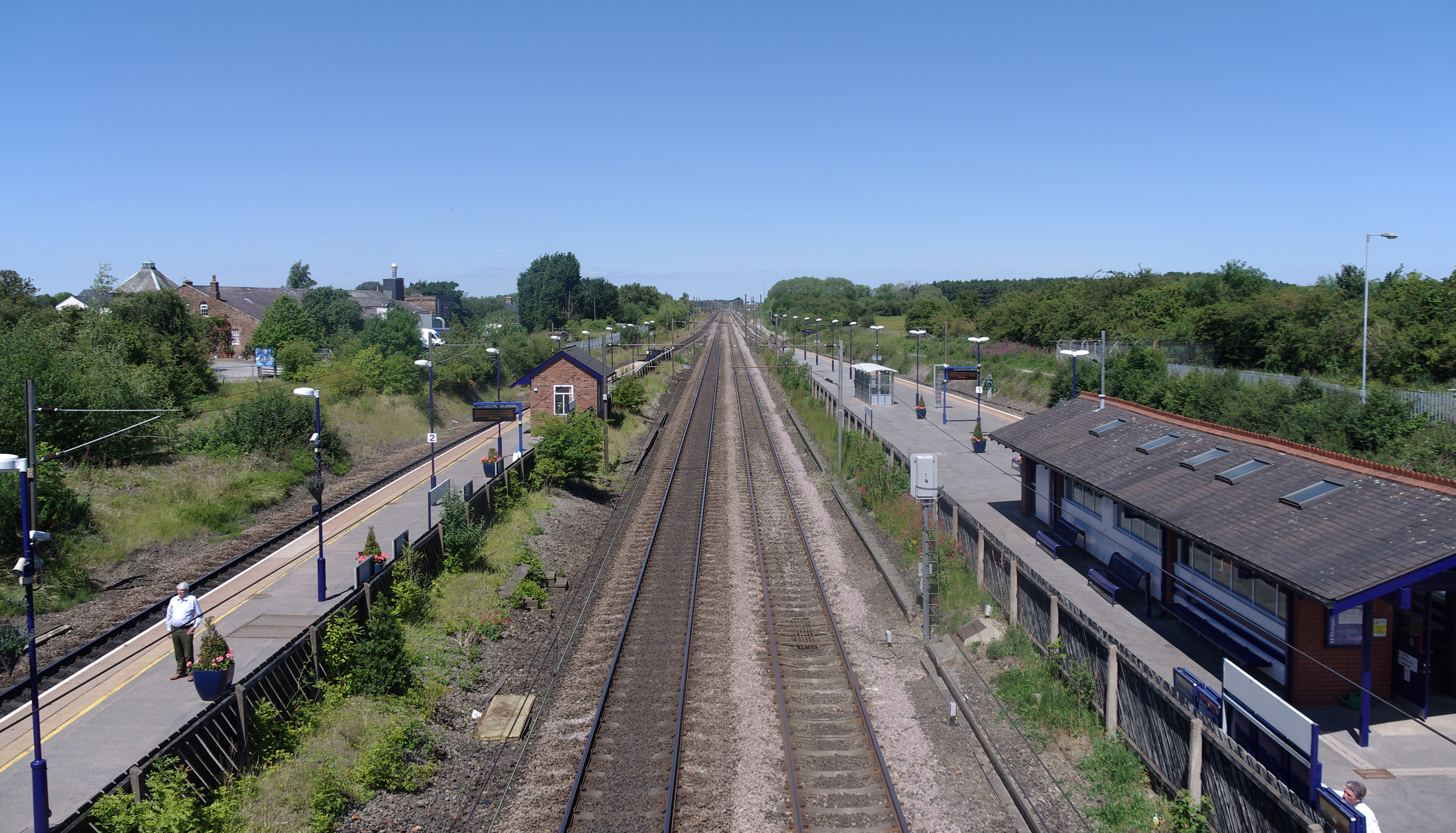
- View north from the footbridge, showing the lack of platforms for the two centre tracks

General information
- Location: Thirsk, North Yorkshire; England
- Coordinates: 54.228240°N 1.372620°W
- Grid reference: SE409816
- Owner: Network Rail
- Manager: TransPennine Express
- Platforms: 2
- Tracks: 4

Other information
- Station code: THI
- Classification: DfT category E

History
- Original company: Great North of England Railway
- Pre-grouping: North Eastern Railway
- Post-grouping: London and North Eastern Railway

Key dates
- 31 March 1841: Opened as Newcastle Junction
- ?: Renamed Thirsk

Passengers
- 2020/21: ▼47,994
- 2021/22: ▲0.209 million
- 2022/23: ▲0.231 million
- 2023/24: ▲0.263 million
- 2024/25: ▲0.288 million
Location
Notes
- Passenger statistics from the Office of Rail and Road

Thirsk railway station is on the East Coast Main Line and serves the market town of Thirsk, North Yorkshire, England. It is situated between York to the south and Northallerton to the north. Its three-letter station code is THI. The station is about 2 miles (3 km) outside of Thirsk town centre and is actually on the edge of the village of Carlton Miniott.

There are four tracks, but only the outer two have platforms; the platform faces serving the innermost pair of tracks were removed in the 1970s in preparation for higher-speed main line running using InterCity 125 trains. The station is operated by TransPennine Express. Other train services are provided by the open-access operator Grand Central.

== History ==
The railway line between York and Darlington was built by the Great North of England Railway, most of which was authorised in 1837; the line was formally opened on 30 March 1841. The station at Thirsk, which opened to the public on 31 March 1841, was originally named Newcastle Junction.

In 1933 Britain's first route-setting power signal box using a switch panel rather than a lever frame opened at Thirsk, to the specification of the LNER's signalling engineers A.F. Bound and A. E. Tattersall, forming the template for many such future installations on the nation's railway network. Larger schemes to a similar design followed at other locations on the former North Eastern Railway network, such as Hull Paragon (1938), Northallerton (1939) and York (1951 - the resignalling project was interrupted by the Second World War and not completed until after nationalisation). Thirsk signal box itself, after various alterations over the course of its life, eventually closed around 1989 under the York IECC signalling scheme.

In 2020, the government awarded £1 million from its Access for All fund to improve the accessibility at the railway station. There are now plans to install lifts and a new footbridge to enable step-free access to all platforms.

== Facilities ==
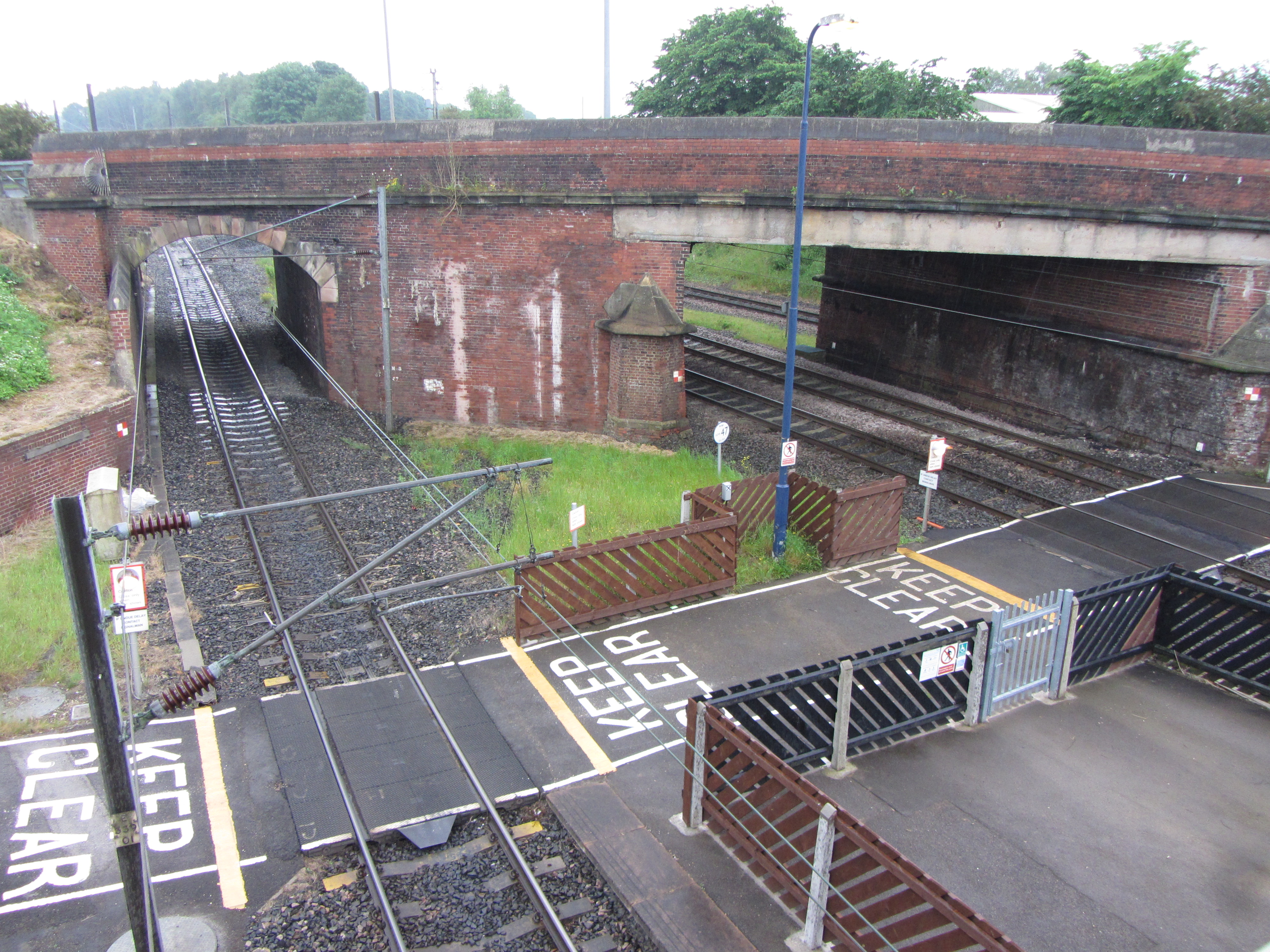
The barrow crossing at the station

The station has a staffed ticket office (on the southbound platform), which is open through the week (06:45-19:30 Mondays to Saturdays, 08:45-17:30 Sundays) and there is also self-service ticket machine available (this can be used for collecting pre-paid tickets as well as for purchasing when the ticket office is closed). There is a waiting shelter on the northbound platform and customer help points and digital CIS displays on both sides. Step-free access to both platforms is via a barrow crossing and only possible when the station is staffed.

== Services ==
TransPennine Express

Northbound, there is an hourly service to Redcar Central via Northallerton, Yarm, Eaglescliffe, Thornaby and Middlesbrough with 2 trains per day extending to Saltburn. One late evening train per day terminates at Darlington with one train continuing to Newcastle via Durham and Chester Le Street.

Southbound, there is an hourly service to Manchester Airport via York, Leeds and Huddersfield with one early morning train to Manchester Victoria (originating at Newcastle). Some evening services terminate at York.

Grand Central

Northbound, six trains per day operate towards Sunderland via Northallerton, Eaglescliffe, Hartlepool and Seaham.

Southbound, six trains per day operate towards London Kings Cross via York with one train per day calling at Peterborough in both directions.

On Sundays, there are five trains per day in each direction (with no calls at Peterborough).

Preceding station	National Rail	Following station
York	TransPennine Express; North TransPennine	Northallerton
York	Grand Central; London to Sunderland	Northallerton
	Historical railways	
Sessay; Line open, station closed	North Eastern Railway; East Coast Main Line	Otterington; Line open, station closed

== Events ==
- 1841 Station opened at the same time as the York - Darlington line.
- 1847 permanent water tower built.
- 1855 Connection to Leeds & Thirsk Railway line to Ripon via Melmerby opened.
- Accidents occurred in 1867, 1870, 1875, 1879 and 1882.
- 1933 Britain's first "panel" route-setting power signal box opened at Thirsk.
- 1954 The first four carriages of the "Heart of Midlothian" express from King's Cross to Edinburgh composed of thirteen coaches derailed. The four carriages derailed after problems with signalling and points, no one was injured.
- 1959 Ripon services cease in September with closure of Melmerby branch line to all traffic.
- 1967 A goods wagon derailed which led to a collision with an express, seven people were killed, 45 injured.

== See also ==
- Thirsk rail crash (1892)
- Thirsk rail crash (1967)

Preceding station	National Rail	Following station
York	TransPennine Express; North TransPennine	Northallerton
York	Grand Central; London to Sunderland	Northallerton
	Historical railways	
Sessay; Line open, station closed	North Eastern Railway; East Coast Main Line	Otterington; Line open, station closed
