= Listed buildings in Staveley, North Yorkshire =

Staveley is a civil parish in the county of North Yorkshire, England. It contains 15 listed buildings that are recorded in the National Heritage List for England. All the listed buildings are designated at Grade II, the lowest of the three grades, which is applied to "buildings of national importance and special interest". The parish contains the village of Staveley and the surrounding countryside. Most of the listed buildings are houses, farmhouses and farm buildings, and cottages, and the others include a former corn mill and associated structures, and a church.

== Buildings ==
Name and location	Photograph	Date	Notes
Barn west of Loftus Hill; 54.04772°N 1.43616°W	—	Late 15th century	An aisled barn in red brick and stone, rendered and painted, it has a pantile roof, hipped on the east, and with a coped gable on the west. On the roof is a small square wooden cupola with a weathervane. The openings include a cart entrance, doorways, casement windows, and a single sash window.
Manor Farmhouse; 54.05916°N 1.44717°W	—	Mid-17th century	The farmhouse has a timber framed core, it was later enclosed in brick with some pebble banding, it is partly roughcast, and has a tile roof. There are two storeys and a partial cellar, four bays, and a continuous rear outshut with a single-storey addition on the right. On the front is a floor band, two doorways, and sash windows, those in the left bay horizontally siding.
The Grange; 54.05951°N 1.44576°W	—	17th century	The house, which was extended to the right in the 19th century, is in sandstone and has a Welsh slate roof, and two storeys. The original block has three bays, and contains segmental-headed sash windows in architraves with voussoirs. The later wing is taller and has two bays. Steps lead up to a doorway in the left bay, with a rectangular fanlight and a hood on brackets, and the windows are sashes, the window in the ground floor is tripartite.
Loftus Hill; 54.04766°N 1.43573°W	—	Late 17th century	A small country house, it is in red brick with stone dressings, rendered and painted, and it has a Welsh slate roof. There are two storeys, and a recessed centre block of five bays. In the centre is a porch with columns, and a doorway with a fanlight, and the windows are sashes. Flanking this are later taller extensions containing two-storey canted bay windows with stone coped parapets.
Manor House and Manor Cottage; 54.05866°N 1.44688°W		18th century	A manor house, later divided into two houses, it is in reddish-brown brick, with a sandstone plinth and quoins, and a Welsh slate roof. There are two storeys and five bays. In the centre is a doorway flanked by windows, all under a large flat hood. To the right is an inserted doorway with a rectangular fanlight, and the windows are sashes in architraves.
Tanner Beck House; 54.05922°N 1.44481°W		18th century	The house is in pinkish-brown brick, with a floor band, dentilled eaves and a pantile roof. There are two storeys and six bays. On the front is a blocked doorway, and the windows are casements with gauged brick arches. The entrance is at the rear.
The Red House; 54.05928°N 1.44637°W	—	1754	The house is in pinkish-brown brick on a stone plinth, with a floor band, and a Welsh slate roof. There are two storeys and three bays. Steps lead up to the central doorway that has an oblong fanlight. It is flanked by canted bay windows, and above it is a datestone. On the upper floor are two sash windows in architraves, with flat brick arches, and between them is a blocked window.
Staveley Farmhouse; 54.05931°N 1.44409°W		Late 18th century	The farmhouse is in reddish-brown brick, with a stone plinth and quoins, and a pantile roof with stone coping and shaped kneelers. There are two storeys and four bays. The doorway has an oblong fanlight, and above it is a blind panel. The windows are sashes with gauged brick arches and keystones.
Barn and linking building to the rear of The Grange; 54.05981°N 1.44594°W	—	Late 18th to early 19th century	The threshing barn, later used for other purposes, is in cobbles and brick, with a pantile roof and two storeys. It contains opposed wagon doors, two pitching doors, and slit vents, and is linked to the house by a single-storey range.
Hope Cote; 54.05913°N 1.44325°W	—	Early 19th century	A cottage at the end of a row, it is in pinkish-brown brick with a Welsh slate roof. There are two storeys and two bays. In the centre is a doorway with a rectangular fanlight. This is flanked by bow windows, and on the upper floor are sash windows in architraves.
Staveley Mill; 54.05927°N 1.45289°W		Early 19th century	A former corn mill, later used for housing, it is in reddish-brown brick with a stone slate roof. There are three storeys and six bays. The windows are sashes with segmental heads, and in the gable is a lunette.
Cottage south of Staveley Mill; 54.05907°N 1.45244°W	—	Early 19th century	The cottage, which was later extended, has two storeys and pantile roofs. The left part is in sandstone, it has two bays, and contains a central doorway and sash windows. To the right is a single-bay extension in reddish-brown brick, and it contains a doorway and a sash window. On the end wall is a garage door, sash windows in segmental-headed brick panels, and a blind oculus above.
Granary, Staveley Mill; 54.05912°N 1.45279°W	—	Early 19th century	The granary, later used for other purposes, has a stone ground floor, and is in reddish-brown brick above. On the ground floor is an elliptical-headed doorway, and steps lead up to an entrance on the upper floor.
Staveley Court; 54.05769°N 1.44822°W	—	Early to mid-19th century	A rectory, later a private house, it is in sandstone, with stuccoed coved eaves and a hipped Welsh slate roof. There are two storeys and three bays. Steps lead up to a central Roman Doric porch, and a doorway with a decorated oblong fanlight. The windows are sashes with stone voussoirs, and the middle window on the upper floor is flanked by small oculi.
All Saints' Church; 54.05858°N 1.44760°W		1864	The church is in sandstone, and has a slate roof with green bands. It consists of a nave, a chancel and a west steeple. The steeple has a tower with four stages, buttresses, string courses, a south doorway, a south clock face, single-light bell openings, and a broach spire with lucarnes. An Anglo-Saxon cross shaft with interlace pattern has been reset into the base of the tower. The windows are lancets.
