= All Saints' Church, Staveley =

Church in Staveley, North Yorkshire, England

Coordinates: 54°03′31″N 1°26′51″W

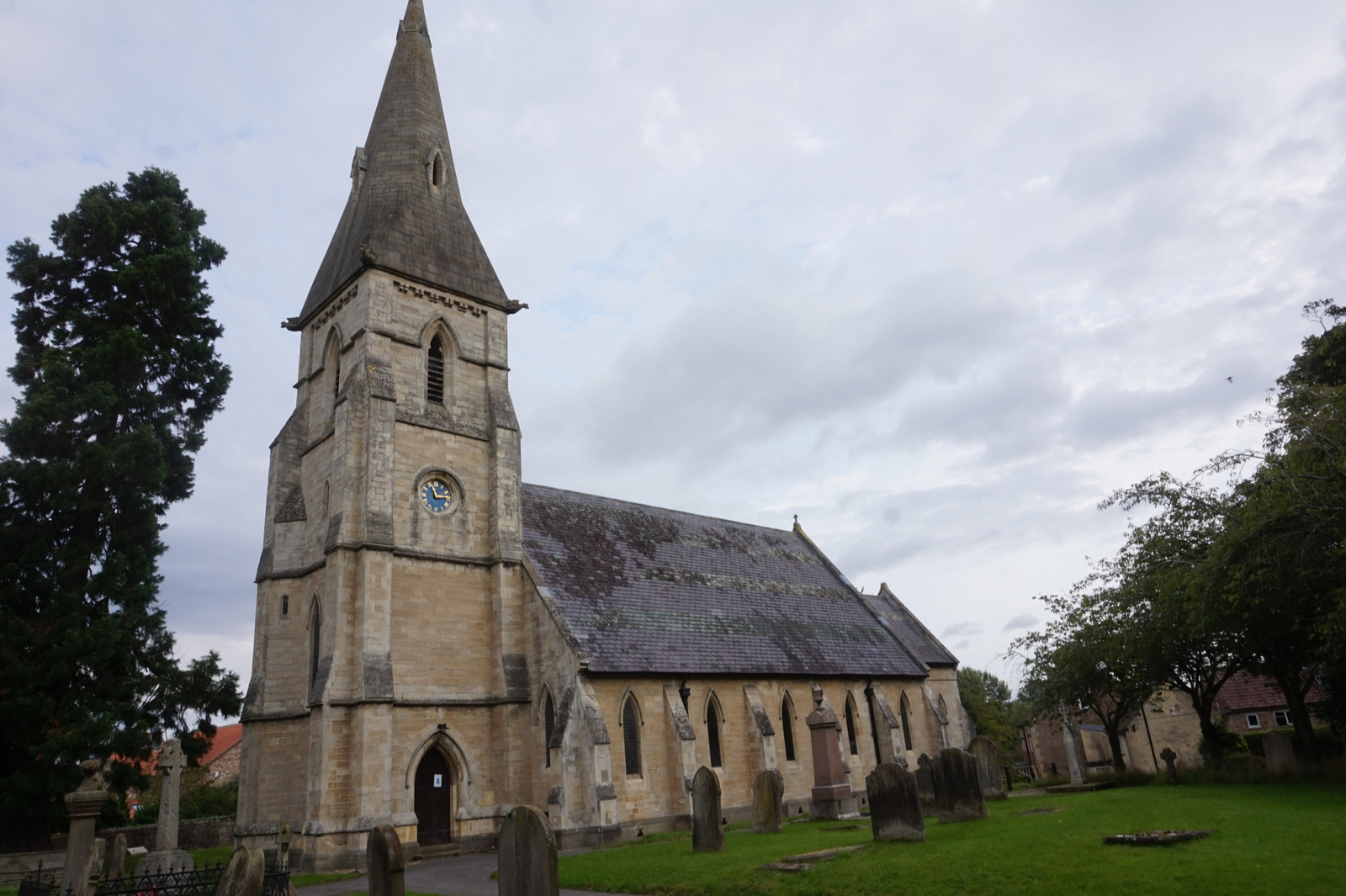
The church, in 2020

All Saints' Church is the parish church of Staveley, North Yorkshire, a village in England.

There was a church in Staveley in the mediaeval period. It was rebuilt in 1831, at a cost of £1,000, to a design by Peter Atkinson. In 1864, it was demolished and again rebuilt. The design was one which John Lowe had drawn up in 1840, and is in a simple and ahistoric Gothic typical of that period. The work cost £2,000, and on completion, it could seat 230 worshippers. In 1874, stained glass by Jean-Baptiste Capronnier was installed in the east window. The building was grade II listed in 1984.

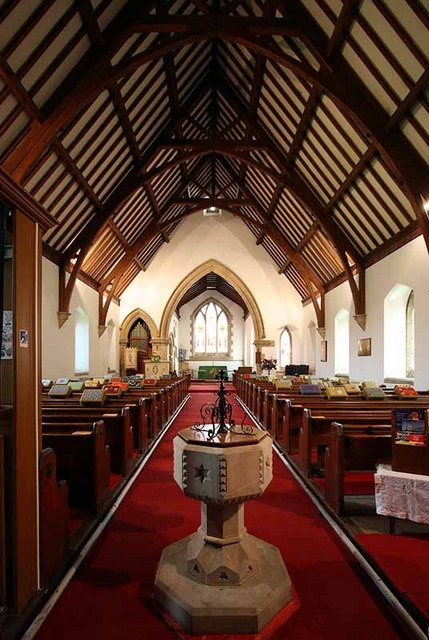
View from the nave into the chancel

The church is built of sandstone, and has a slate roof with green bands. It consists of a nave, a chancel and a west steeple. The steeple has a tower with four stages, buttresses, string courses, a south doorway, a south clock face, single-light bell openings, and a broach spire with lucarnes. An Anglo-Saxon cross shaft with interlace pattern has been reset into the base of the tower. The windows are lancets.

== See also ==
- Listed buildings in Staveley, North Yorkshire
