= Boroughbridge railway station =

Disused railway station in North Yorkshire, England

Boroughbridge
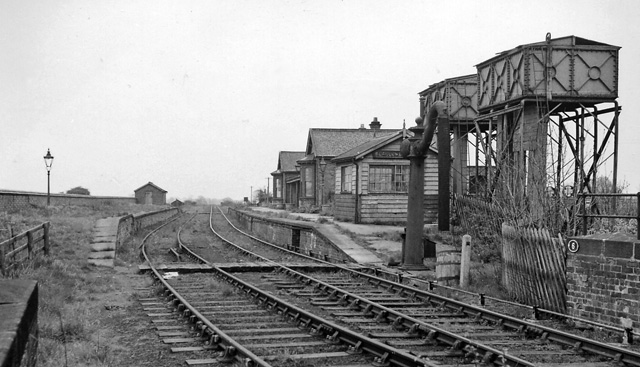
- The remains of Boroughbridge station in 1961

General information
- Location: Boroughbridge, North Yorkshire; England
- Coordinates: 54.1°N 1.3947°W
- Grid reference: SE396672
- Platforms: 2

Other information
- Status: Disused

History
- Original company: York, Newcastle and Berwick Railway
- Pre-grouping: North Eastern Railway
- Post-grouping: London & North Eastern Railway

Key dates
- 17 June 1847: Opened
- 1 April 1875: Resited
- 25 September 1950: Closed to passengers
- 1964: Closed completely
Location

Boroughbridge railway station served the town of Boroughbridge, North Yorkshire, England from 1847 to 1964 on the Pilmoor, Boroughbridge and Knaresborough Railway. The original station was a terminus with an east facing line, heading towards Pilmoor Junction on the East Coast Main Line. In 1875, the line was extended westwards to meet the line at Knaresborough.

== History ==
The station opened on 17 June 1847 by the York, Newcastle and Berwick Railway. It was resited in 1875 and the first station remained open for goods traffic until 1964. Between the 1875 and 1886, the first service of the day to Harrogate would originate at Boroughbridge, and the last service of the day would terminate here also, so the engine shed was retained for overnighting purposes. The 1847 station had two dead end platforms, with the goods yard only being accessible from the southernmost platform via a reversal.

The second station opened on 1 April 1875 and closed for passengers on 25 September 1950. Images of the station show the station signs being stylised as Borough Bridge instead of Boroughbridge; as these were hand-painted, it is thought this was a mistake by the sign writer. The newer station had eight goods lines, including two which were located within the old station environs, and two platforms adjacent to double track, making Borougbridge the only station on the line with a passing loop. The 1904 Handbook of stations, lists Boroughbridge as having a 5-tonne (5.5-ton) crane, and being able to handle most types of goods traffic. Typical freight traffic handled at Boroughbridge included cleaning products and sugar beet outbound, and coal, animal feed and oil inbound.

=== Station masters ===
- John King, 1862 – 1874
- J. W. King, 1874 – 1885
- Robert Elliott, 1885 – 1903
- John Deans 1903 – 1904 (previously station master at Otley, died shortly after appointment)
- Thornley Smith 1904 – 1912
- Matthew William Seymour 1912 – 1922 (formerly station master at Darlington)
- Richard Cawood, 1922 – 1933
- A. Johnson 1933 – 1936 (also station master of Brafferton and Copgrove) (afterwards station master at South Gosforth and Jesmond)
- C. B. Bainbridge 1936 – 1940 (also station master of Copgrove) (afterwards acting station master at Hessle)
- D. MacPherson, 1940 – 1954
- W. Watson, 1954 – 1964

Preceding station	Disused railways	Following station
Brafferton; Line and station closed	East and West Yorkshire Junction Railway; Pilmoor, Boroughbridge and Knaresborough Railway	Copgrove; Line and station closed
