= St Mary's Church, Raskelf =

Church in Raskelf, North Yorkshire, England

Coordinates: 54°07′49″N 1°15′09″W

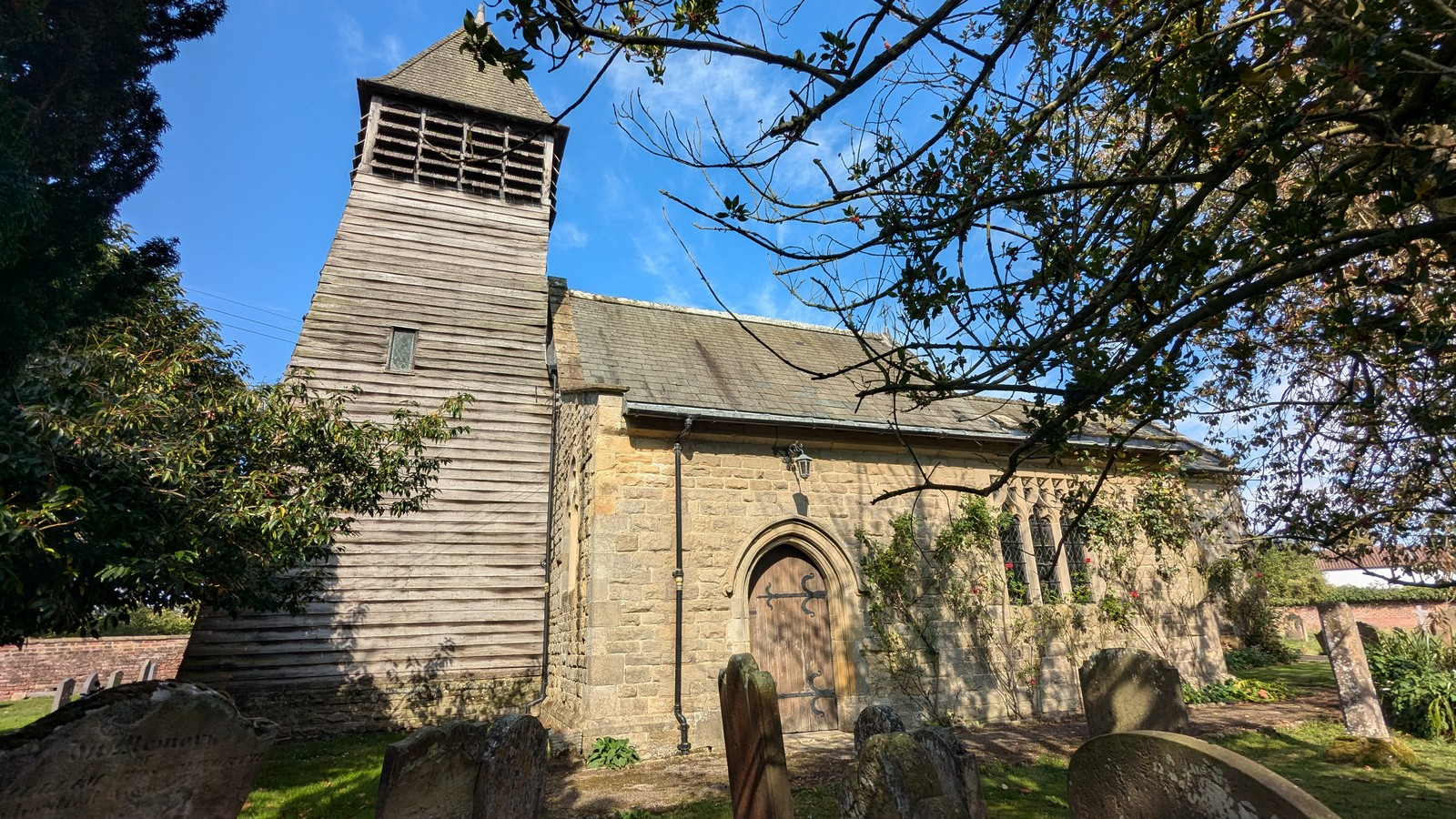
The church, in 2024

St Mary's Church is an Anglican church in Raskelf, a village in North Yorkshire, in England.

The church was built in the 12th century, from which period the north arcade and perhaps the west wall survive. The chancel was rebuilt in the 14th century, and a north chapel was added in the 15th century. The timber west tower was probably added in the late 15th century, and is the only one in the former North Riding of Yorkshire. In 1879, the church was heavily restored by Ewan Christian, who rebuilt most of the structure and added a south aisle. The church was grade II* listed in 1960. The church has for almost all its history been a chapel of ease to St John and All Saints' Church, Easingwold, but from 1881 to 1891 it had its own parish.

The body of the church is built in sandstone with a stone slate roof, and consists of a nave, north and south aisles, and a chancel with a north chapel. The west tower is weatherboarded, on a rusticated stone plinth, with a shingled top and a tiled pyramidal roof. A 12th-century lancet window survives in the north wall of the chapel, and the west window of the north aisle is probably 14th century. Inside, the chancel has some Perpendicular Gothic benches, there is a 17th-century screen to the north chapel, and a 17th-century communion rail. There is a late-12th century font with a 17th-century cover.

== See also ==
- Grade II* listed churches in North Yorkshire (district)
- Listed buildings in Raskelf
