= Easingwold Railway =

Branch line in the Vale of York, England

The Easingwold Railway was a two-mile-long (3 km) branch line from Alne Station to Easingwold in the Vale of York, England.

== History ==
Easingwold Railway Act 1887
- Act of Parliament
- Parliament of the United Kingdom
- Long title: An Act for authorising the construction of a Railway in the North Riding of the County of York to be called the Easingwold Railway and for other purposes.
- Citation: 50 & 51 Vict. c. clxxxii

Dates
- Royal assent: 23 August 1887

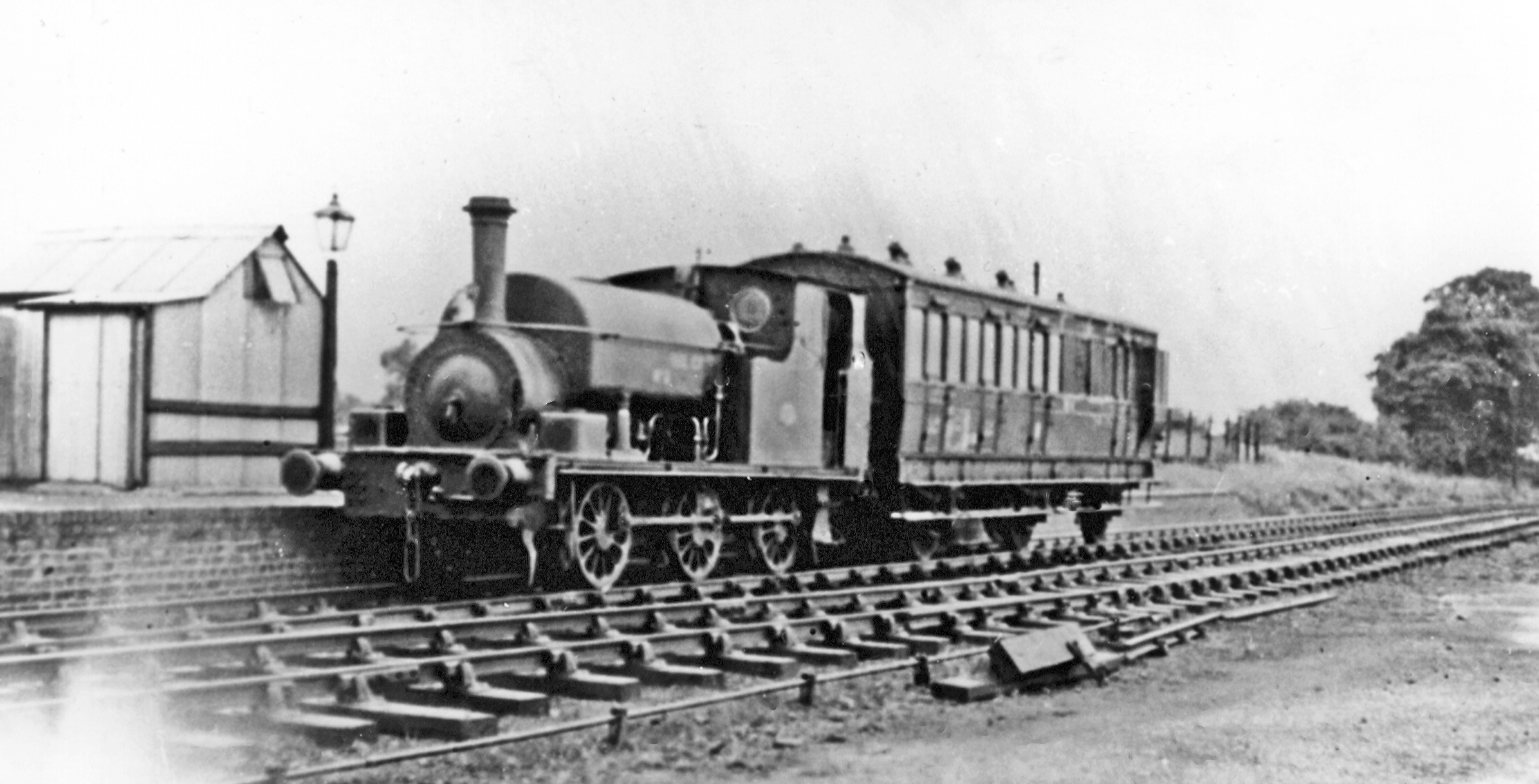
Train from Alne at Easingwold, 1946

Although the line was first proposed in 1836 it was not until 23 August 1887 that a consortium of local businessmen formed the Easingwold Railway Company and obtained the Easingwold Railway Act 1887 (50 & 51 Vict. c. clxxxii) giving approval to build the line. Although the first contractor, Death and Company went bust during construction a second contractor was found and the line opened on 27 July 1891 at a cost of £17,000. The line was privately owned throughout its period of operation and made small profits for most of that time. The line fell victim to road competition in the late 1940s and passenger services ended on 29 November 1948, with freight services ending with the line's closure 30 December 1957.

A special train aimed at railway enthusiasts ran along the line and back on 23 June 1957, with the passengers travelling in open wagons.

== Stock ==
The line took ownership of at least three locomotives; a Hudswell Clarke 0-4-0ST works no.342 was purchased on 24 June 1891, but due to an objection to 0-4-0Ts, Hudswell Clarke 0-6-0ST works no. 334 was used instead. Hudswell Clarke works No. 608 was supplied on 7 May 1903. It was more powerful than the other two locomotives though. It made brief returns to Hudswell Clarke for overhauls and repairs. An older 0-6-0ST, named Trent was used in September 1924 when 608 went for repairs, this locomotive survived until 1948/49 when it was scrapped in winter at Darlington when it arrived for a new firebox and boiler in 1947, but a replacement locomotive was chosen instead of the estimated £1,400 price of new equipment. The line's own locomotives were green and the coaches red. Trains commonly consisted of a locomotive and one coach, with a journey time of eight minutes.

The first set of coaches were two 26-foot (7.9 m) NER four-wheel coaches, these were retired in 1903. As the NER coaches' replacements, three North London Railway carriages from 1872, two composites and a brake third/luggage van with birdcage lookout were used on passenger duties. After the NLR stock was retired in 1920, they were replaced by two NER six-wheelers which lost their centre wheels for use on the ELR, but both were later replaced in the 1930s by an NER six-wheeler. In 1946, the NER six-wheeler was replaced by Manchester, Sheffield & Lincolnshire Railway 6-wheel brake composite which was employed on passenger workings, this carriage is now preserved on the Chasewater Railway.

== Infrastructure ==
The track was flat-bottomed, weighing 95lbs per yard. The ruling gradient was 1 in 100. There was no signalling. The exact route length was 2 miles 37 chains (4.0 km).

== Trivia ==
Part of this former railway is now one of the world's most bizarrely sized gardens measuring approximately 10 metres in width and almost half a mile long. A stroll from the front to the back takes nearly 30 minutes. The garden starts where the former railway and the street called Railway House cross.

== Book sources ==
- Kidner, R W (1947) [1937]. Standard Gauge Light Railways (2nd ed.). Chislehurst: Oakwood Press. OCLC 642410845.
- Morrison, Gavin (1993). Vintage Railtours: Railway Correspondence and Travel Society, a Pictorial Record 1954-69. Peterborough: Silver Link Publishing. ISBN 978-1-85-794007-7.
