= Husthwaite Gate railway station =

Disused railway station in North Yorkshire, England

Husthwaite Gate
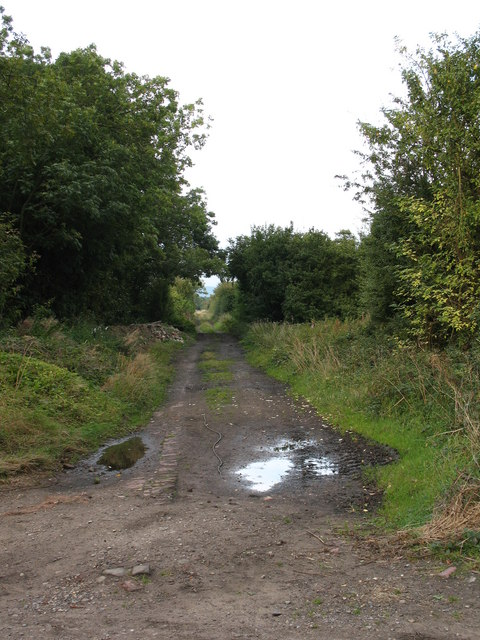
- Old railway track at Husthwaite Gate looking east; the row of bricks indicates the edge of the platform, September 2007

General information
- Location: Husthwaite, North Yorkshire; England
- Coordinates: 54.174518°N 1.210406°W
- Grid reference: SE516717
- Platforms: 1

Other information
- Status: Disused

History
- Original company: North Eastern Railway
- Pre-grouping: North Eastern Railway
- Post-grouping: London and North Eastern Railway

Key dates
- c. 1856: opened
- 31 January 1953: closed for passengers
- 7 August 1964: closed for freight
Location

Husthwaite Gate railway station is a disused railway station in North Yorkshire, England. It served the nearby village of Husthwaite.

When the Thirsk and Malton Line was completed in 1853, there was originally no station near Husthwaite. However, a single platform on the north side of the single line was provided by 1856, east of the crossing with the minor road from Husthwaite to Carlton Husthwaite, known as Elphin Bridge Lane. A stationmaster's house, incorporating the ticket office, was built on the opposite side of the crossing.

A goods siding in front of the stationmaster's house was built at the cost of Sir George Wombwell, a local landowner. In 1872, it was taken into public use and Wombwell's outlay was refunded. In 1880, a 200-yard (180 m) tramway was built to connect the goods siding to Angram Wood, north east of the station. This was used to forward timber from Angram to Helmsley for processing. The gauge of the tramway is unknown.

In 1856, a single train plied the route between Pilmoor and Malton three times daily. This had risen to four trains a day by 1895. In 1906, services on the line amounted to six trains each way, five of which went south to York and one which ran north to Pilmoor and offered a connecting service via the Pilmoor, Boroughbridge and Knaresborough Railway to Harrogate.

The station was closed to passengers in January 1953, but the line was still used by long-distance passenger traffic and excursions. It remained as a goods station but became an unstaffed delivery siding from October 1963. The station was closed in August 1964, having latterly been serviced with trains only from the east. An accident in March 1963 on the East Coast Main Line damaged Sessay Wood Junction and it was never repaired. The line was closed in 1964, and the track pulled up in the following year. A brick course of the platform remains. The stationmaster's house is a private dwelling, and the station sidings area is now a campsite.

Preceding station	Disused railways	Following station
Pilmoor; Line open, station closed	North Eastern Railway; Gilling and Pickering Line	Coxwold; Line and station closed
Pilmoor; Line open, station closed	North Eastern Railway; Thirsk and Malton Line	Coxwold; Line and station closed
