= Henry Major =

New Zealand Anglican clergyman and theologian

The Reverend Canon Henry Major FSA
- Principal of Ripon Hall, Oxford; Ripon Clergy College (1919)
- In office: 1919 to 1948
- Predecessor: John Battersby Harford
- Successor: Robert Douglas Richardson

Orders
- Ordination: 1895 (deacon); 1896 (priest) by William Cowie

Personal details
- Born: 28 July 1871 Plymouth, Devon, England
- Died: 26 January 1961 (aged 89)
- Denomination: Anglican
- Spouse: Mary (m. 1899)
- Children: Three
- Education: St John's College, Meadowbank; Auckland University College; Exeter College, Oxford

Henry Dewsbury Alves "Hal" Major, FSA (28 July 1871 – 26 January 1961) was a New Zealand Anglican clergyman and theologian. He was Principal of Ripon Hall, Oxford from 1919 to 1948: first, when it was Ripon Clergy College in Ripon, Yorkshire (1919), and then as Ripon Hall in Oxford (1919 to 1948). A prominent liberal Christian, he was active in the Modern Churchmen's Union, and was founder and editor of its Modern Churchman journal (1911 to 1956).

== Early life ==
Major was born on 28 July 1871 in Plymouth, Devon, England. His parents were Mary Ursula (née Alves) and Henry Daniel Major, an Admiralty clerk. In 1878, the family emigrated to New Zealand and joined the new settlement at Katikati. He was educated at home by his father, and received religious instruction from his mother (heavily influenced by the Tractarian John Keble) and by the Revd William Katterns (local vicar and Ostrich farmer).

In 1885, he graduated with a Bachelor of Arts (BA) degree from University College, Auckland. He then studied natural sciences, specialising in geology, and graduated with a Master of Arts (MA) degree from Auckland in 1886. In 1890, Major matriculated into St John's College, Auckland, an Anglican theological college.

== Ordained ministry ==
Major was ordained by William Cowie, Bishop of Auckland, as a deacon in 1895 and as a priest in 1896. He served his curacy at St Mark's Church, Remuera in the Diocese of Auckland between 1895 and 1899. He then moved to the Diocese of Wellington, where he was acting vicar of Waitotara from 1899 to 1900, and vicar of St Peter's Church, Hamilton from 1900 to 1903.

In 1903, Major left New Zealand to return to England. He entered Exeter College, Oxford to study theology, and graduated after two years of study with a BA degree in 1905: as per tradition, his BA was promoted to a Master of Arts (MA Oxon) degree. While at Oxford, he was exposed to modernist theology, liberal Christianity, and historical criticism of the Bible.

In January 1906, Major moved to Ripon, Yorkshire where he had been appointed chaplain of the Ripon Clergy College. That year, he was additionally appointed vice-principal of the college. In Ripon, he came under the influence of the broad church Bishop of Ripon, William Boyd Carpenter. In addition to his scholarly appointments, he maintained his parish ministry: first as curate of North Stainley (1908 to 1911), then as Rector of St Michael's Church, Copgrove (1911 to 1919).

In 1919, Major was made Principal of the Ripon Clergy College: that year, he oversaw the move of the college from Yorkshire to Parks Road, Oxford, Oxfordshire, and its renaming as Ripon Hall, Oxford. He was a Select Preacher at the University of Oxford in 1922 and at the University of Cambridge in 1925. In 1924, he was awarded a Doctor of Divinity (DD) degree by the University of Oxford: the DD is the most senior degree awarded by the university. He delivered the William Belden Noble Lectures at Harvard University in 1925. From 1929 until his death, he was also Vicar of Merton, Oxfordshire. In 1933, he once more oversaw the moving of the college, and it relocated to Boars Hill, a village on the outskirts of Oxford: this time, however, it retained its name. He kept the college open during the Second World War, although with reduced students and some of the college's buildings were given over to be used as a hospital. Having become increasingly deaf, he stepped down as Principal of Ripon Hall, Oxford in 1948, and retired to the vicarage at Merton.

=== Views ===
Major began his Christian life in the Tractarian Anglo-Catholic tradition of his mother, then moved towards a broad church position, before establishing himself as a liberal Christian in the first decade of the 1900s. He was "sceptical of the virgin birth, the physical resurrection, and other miracles". His beliefs caused conflict with others within and without Anglicanism: there was an unsuccessful attempt to have him tried for heresy in 1921, he was nicknamed the "Anti-Christ of Oxford" by traditionalist Anglo-Catholics, and a Baptist minister organised a series of anti-modernist meetings in reaction to his visit to New Zealand in 1928.

Major was a major figure in the Modern Churchmen's Union, which he had joined by 1910. In 1911, he founded its Modern Churchman journal, and served as its editor from 1911 to 1956.

== Personal life ==
On 1 November 1899 Major married Mary Eliza (née McMillan). Together, they had two sons and one daughter: one son was killed in action during the Second World War.

Major predeceased his wife, dying on 26 January 1961 in Merton, Oxfordshire, England. He is buried in the graveyard of St Swithun's Church, Merton, Oxfordshire.

== Honours ==
Major was an elected Fellow of the Society of Antiquaries of London (FSA). He was made an honorary canon of Birmingham Cathedral in 1941.

== Selected works ==
- Major, H. D. A. (1922). Memorials of Copgrove: Together with the Parish Registers from A.D. 1584 to 1790. Oxford: Basil Blackwell.
- Major, H. D. A. (1927). English modernism: its origin, methods, aims;. Cambridge, MA: Harvard University Press.
- Major, H. D. A. (1948). Civilisation and Religious Values (Hibbert Lectures). London: Allen & Unwin.
