= Easingwold railway station =

Disused railway station in North Yorkshire, England

Easingwold
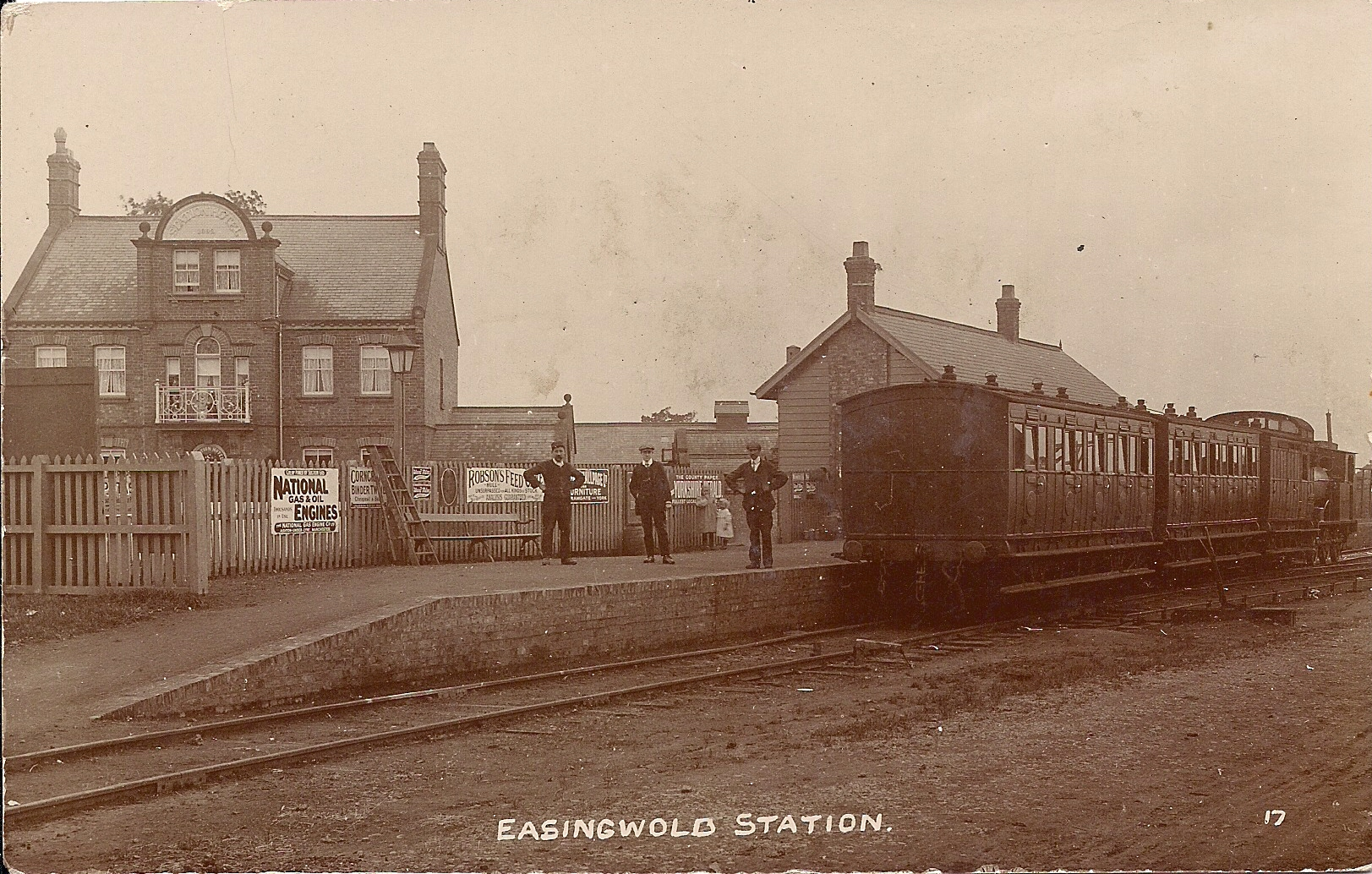

General information
- Location: Easingwold, North Yorkshire; England
- Coordinates: 54.12134°N 1.20150°W
- Grid reference: SE527698
- Platforms: 1

Other information
- Status: Disused

History
- Original company: Easingwold Railway
- Pre-grouping: Easingwold Railway
- Post-grouping: Easingwold Railway

Key dates
- 27 July 1891: Station opens
- 29 November 1948: Station closes to passengers
- 30 December 1957: Station closes to freight
Location

Easingwold railway station is a closed timber built railway station that served the market town of Easingwold, in North Yorkshire, England and was on the Easingwold Railway.

== History ==
Although the line was first proposed in 1836 it was not until 23 August 1887 that a consortium of local businessmen formed the Easingwold Railway Company and obtained parliamentary approval to build the line. Although the first contractor, Death and Company went bust during construction a second contractor was found and the line opened on 27 July 1891 at a cost of £17,000. The line was privately owned throughout its period of operation and made small profits for most of that time. The line fell victim to road competition in the late 1940s and passenger services ended on 29 November 1948, with freight services ending with the lines' closure 30 December 1957.

The station was demolished and the site has been redeveloped for housing.

Former Services

Preceding station	Disused railways	Following station
Alne	Easingwold Railway	Terminus
