= Brafferton railway station =

Disused railway station in North Yorkshire, England

Brafferton
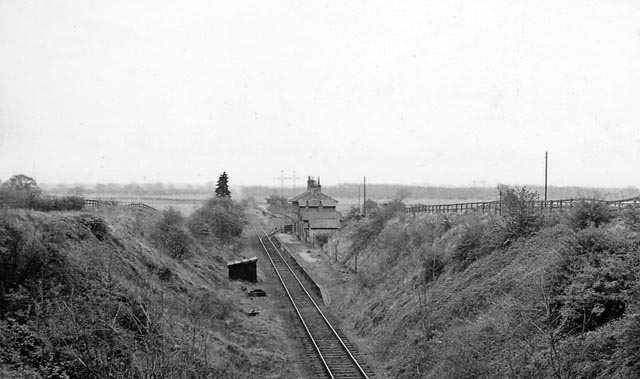
- The remains of Brafferton station looking towards the north east

General information
- Location: Brafferton, North Yorkshire; England
- Coordinates: 54.1303°N 1.3312°W
- Grid reference: SE438707
- Platforms: 1

Other information
- Status: Disused

History
- Original company: York, Newcastle and Berwick Railway
- Pre-grouping: North Eastern Railway
- Post-grouping: LNER

Key dates
- 17 June 1847: Opened
- 25 September 1950: Closed to passengers
- 5 October 1964: Closed completely
Location

Brafferton railway station served Brafferton, North Yorkshire, England, from 1847 to 1964 on the Pilmoor, Boroughbridge and Knaresborough Railway.

== History ==
The station opened on 17 June 1847 by the York, Newcastle and Berwick Railway. It closed to passengers on 25 September 1950 and to goods traffic on 5 October 1964.

The station was initially opened with two platforms, but as traffic did not warrant both, the platform on the northern side was removed soon after opening. Between the station's opening and 1929, it only had three stationmasters. After 1929, the station was looked after by the stationmaster based at Boroughbridge. The station had goods sidings at either side of the line, and at the eastern end, had a two-road coal depot. The 1904 Railway Clearing House book, lists Brafferton as being able to handle most goods traffic, but did not have a permanent crane to load or offload goods.

With the line being fairly agricultural, most of the traffic through and at the station was agricultural in nature, either livestock or vegetables. However, military used the line in the First World War to a depot near Myton-on-Swale, and in the Second World War, the former RAF Helperby airbase was turned into an ammunition dump for the airfields of No. 6 Group RCAF. This traffic continued to the Air Ministry siding until 1956.

| Preceding station | Disused railways | Following station |
|---|---|---|
| Pilmoor; Line and station closed | Leeds Northern Railway; Pilmoor, Boroughbridge and Knaresborough Railway | Boroughbridge; Line and station closed |
