= St Michael's Church, Copgrove =

Church in Copgrove, North Yorkshire, England

Coordinates: 54°03′50″N 1°28′20″W

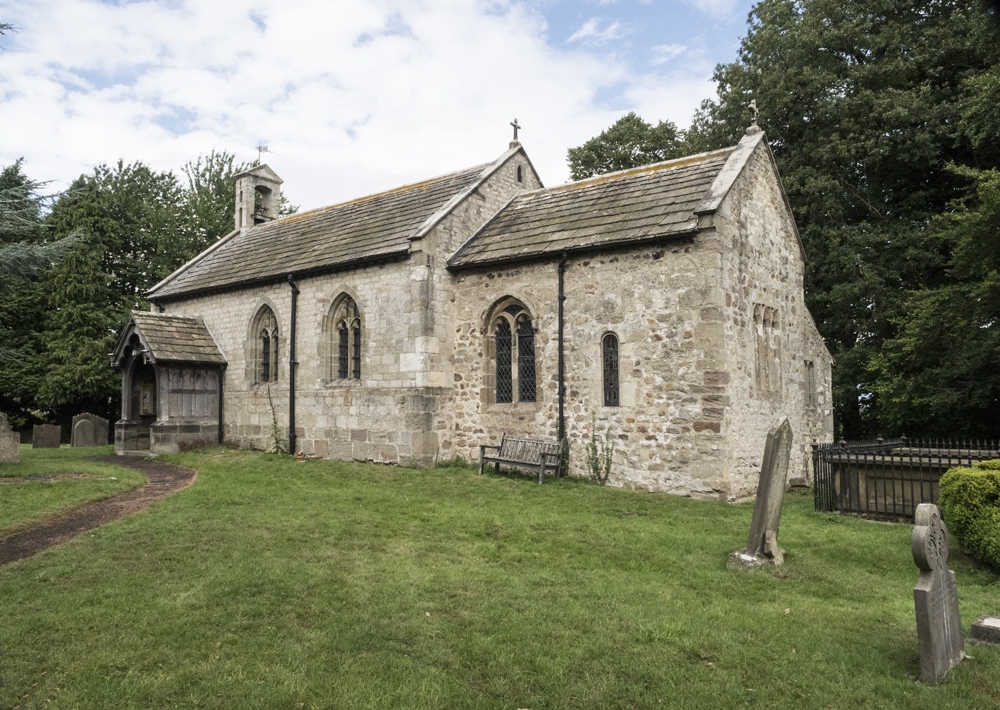
The building, in 2023

St Michael's Church is an Anglican church in Copgrove, a village in North Yorkshire, in England.

A church was recorded in Copgrove in the Domesday Book, and it is possible that the lowest courses of sandstone in the south nave wall may survive from this building. The church was rebuilt in the 12th century, in limestone, and by 1216 it belonged to the Knights Hospitallers. In the late 17th century, it is believed that a tower and short steeple were removed, and replaced by the current bellcote. The building was restored in 1889, and then more thoroughly by C. Hodgson Fowler in 1897, when the roof was raised and floor lowered. From 1911 until 1919, the rector of the church was Henry Major. The building was Grade II* listed in 1966.

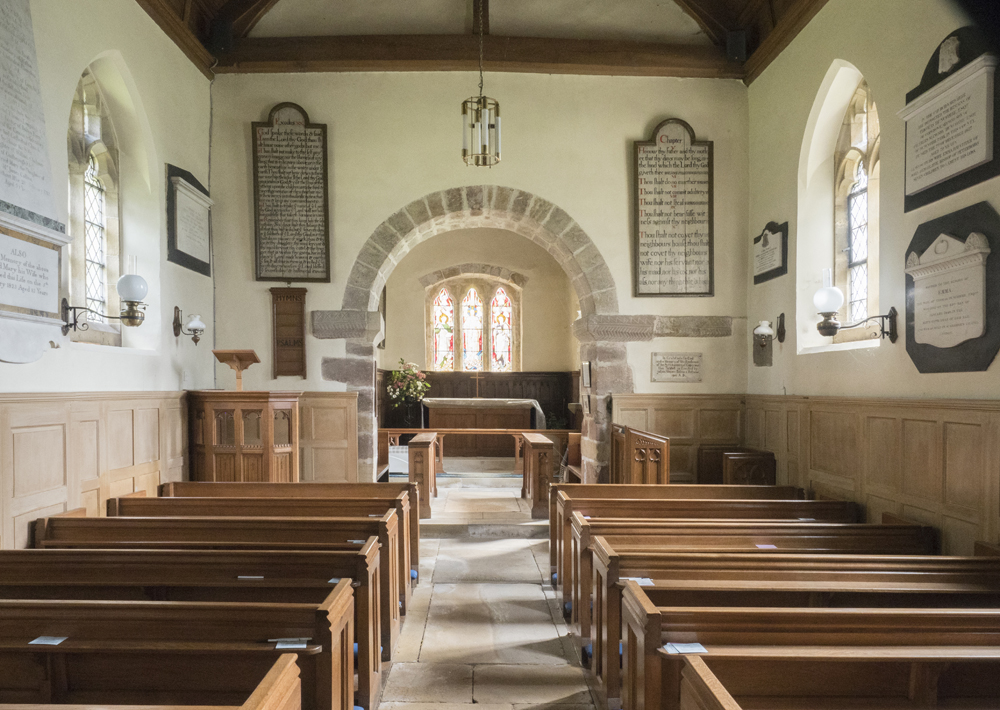
View from the nave into the chancel

It church built of limestone with a stone slate roof, and consists of a nave with a south porch, and a chancel with a north vestry. On the west gable is a bellcote with a segmental arch and a moulded pediment. In the chancel is a Norman window, the other chancel windows are Decorated or Perpendicular in style, and the nave windows date from the restoration. In the north-east exterior corner of the vestry is a carved stone, either Saxon or early Norman. It is known as the "Devil's Stone", and depicts a Sheela-na-gig.

Inside the church, the altar is a 12th-century slab rediscovered during the restoration. The chancel arch is also a 12th-century survival, with chevron and dogtooth motifs. The nave walls are panelled with wood reused from 17th- and 18th-century pews. There is a brass inscription from 1637, and a board with the arms of Queen Anne of Great Britain, painted over those of Charles II. There are numerous wall memorials from the 18th and 19th centuries, to the Duncombe family, who lived at Copgrove Hall.

== See also ==
- Grade II* listed churches in North Yorkshire (district)
- Listed buildings in Copgrove
