= Copgrove railway station =

Disused railway station in North Yorkshire, England

Copgrove
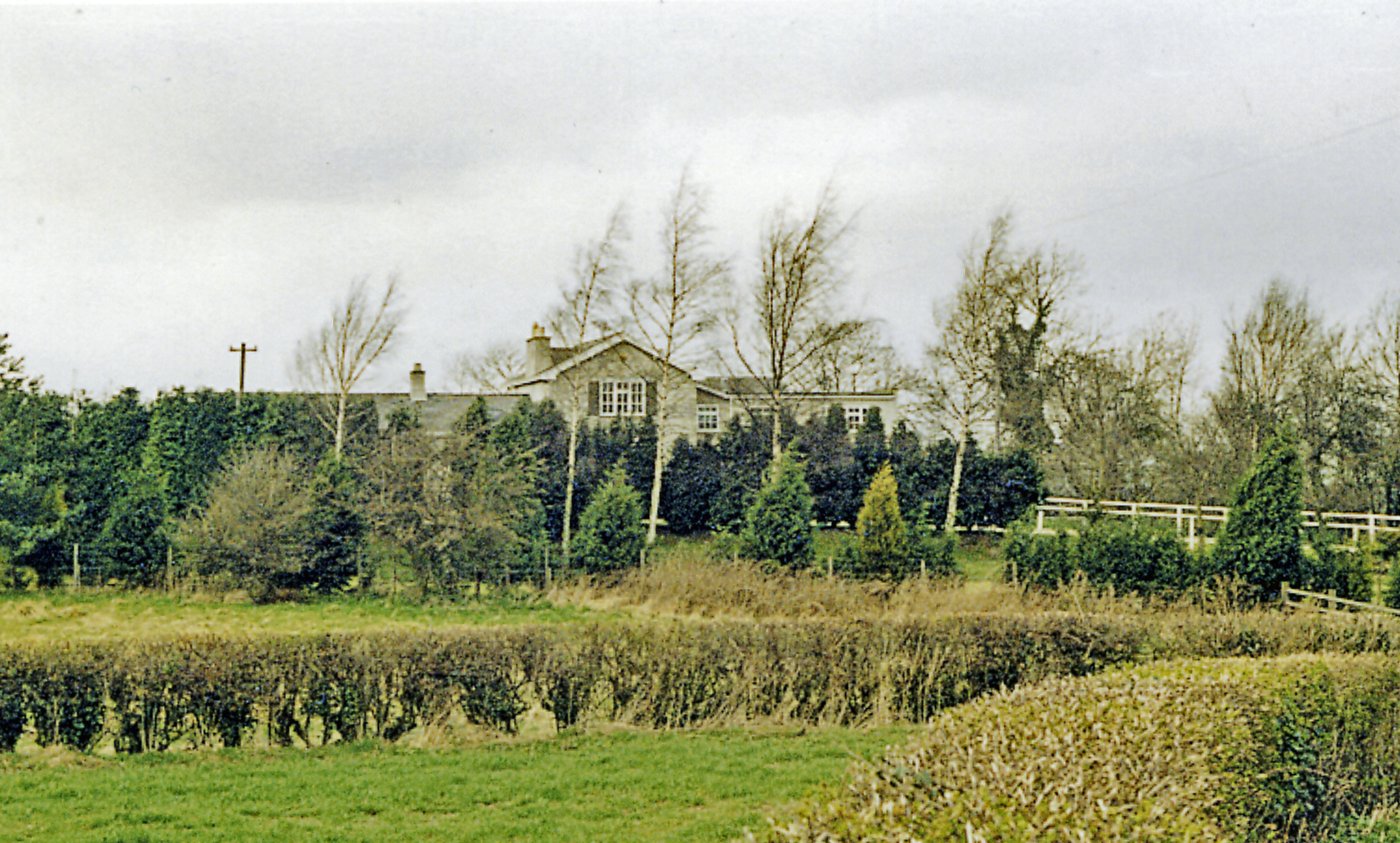
- The site of Copgrove station in 1989

General information
- Location: Copgrove, North Yorkshire; England
- Coordinates: 54.0545°N 1.4409°W
- Grid reference: SE367622
- Platforms: 2

Other information
- Status: Disused

History
- Original company: North Eastern Railway
- Pre-grouping: North Eastern Railway
- Post-grouping: London and North Eastern Railway

Key dates
- 1 April 1875: Opened
- 25 September 1950: Closed to passengers
- 5 October 1964: Closed completely
Location

Copgrove railway station served the village of Copgrove, North Yorkshire, England from 1875 to 1964 on the Pilmoor, Boroughbridge and Knaresborough Railway.

== History ==
The station opened on 1 April 1875 by the North Eastern Railway. It closed to passengers on 25 September 1950 and to goods traffic on 5 October 1964.

Preceding station	Disused railways	Following station
Boroughbridge; Line and station closed	North Eastern Railway; Pilmoor, Boroughbridge and Knaresborough Railway	Knaresborough; Line closed, station open
