= Raskelf =

Village and civil parish in North Yorkshire, England

Coordinates: 54°08′00″N 1°14′55″W

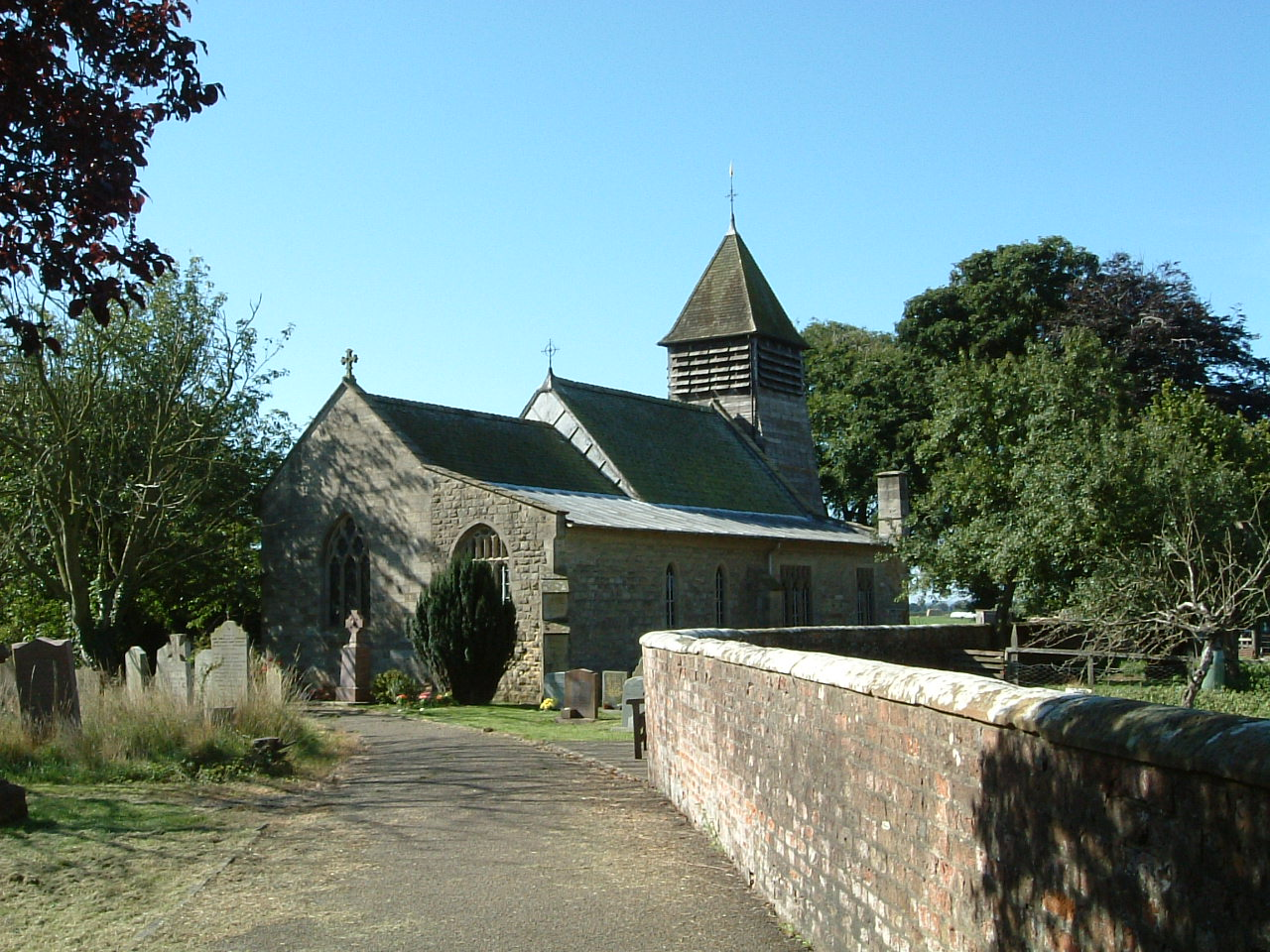
- St Mary's Church with its wooden west tower

- Location within North Yorkshire
- Population: 519 (2011 census)
- OS grid reference: SE491709
- Unitary authority: North Yorkshire
- Ceremonial county: North Yorkshire
- Region: Yorkshire and the Humber
- Country: England
- Sovereign state: United Kingdom
- Post town: YORK
- Postcode district: YO61
- Dialling code: 01347
- Police: North Yorkshire
- Fire: North Yorkshire
- Ambulance: Yorkshire
- UK Parliament: Thirsk and Malton

Raskelf is a village and civil parish in North Yorkshire, England. The electoral roll has a population of around 400 measured at 519 in the 2011 census.

== History ==
The village appears in the Domesday Book as Rascill and its derivation is believed to be Ra (Roe Deer) and Skelf (Shelf). This implies that at the time, Roe Deer were present on the shelf of land where Raskelf now stands.

The village was originally in the Wapentake of Bulmer. The village was part of the Hambleton District between 1974 and 2023. It is now administered by North Yorkshire Council.

The village itself is split into two, 'The Green' and the main village which are about 400 yards apart. It is situated just off the A19, 2.5 miles (4 km) north west of Easingwold, 15 miles (24 km) north of York and 9 miles (15 km) south of Thirsk. It can be reached by either travelling from Easingwold, turning left at the roundabout at the top of Long Street, along Raskelf Road, or directly from the A19 (just after the Easingwold bypass travelling north), or from Helperby which connects Raskelf to the Boroughbridge/Harrogate areas of North Yorkshire.

The 12th-century St Mary's Church, Raskelf is notable for being the only church in Yorkshire to have a wooden tower. The church is in the Parish of Easingwold with Raskelf in the Diocese of York.

In 1623, Ralph Reynard and Mark Dun, were accused and convicted of the murder of a yeoman by the name of Fletcher. Along with Fletcher's wife, they were executed.

== Transport ==
Buses provide a Mondays only working from Raskelf to Boroughbridge and back. Service 29 goes to York 6 times daily with only 4 return workings. Most of these services start in Easingwold. Bus 30X runs from Thirsk to York via Raskelf seven times daily Mondays to Saturdays. There are no buses through Raskelf on Sundays.

== Railway station ==
Raskelf railway station was ½ mile (0.8 km) to the west of the village itself. It was opened in 1841 by the Great North of England Railway, which was in itself a line built by the North Eastern Railway to connect York with Newcastle. The station was closed to passengers in 1958 and closed completely in 1964. It was the last station on the East Coast Main Line before the north and south to east junction with the Thirsk and Malton Line. The line is still open today and the site of the station is where Hag Lane crosses over the railway. Raskelf station was 13 miles and 28 chains (22 km) north of York and 8 miles and 51 chains (14 km) south of Thirsk.

== See also ==
- Listed buildings in Raskelf
