= Listed buildings in Raskelf =

Raskelf is a civil parish in the county of North Yorkshire, England. It contains five listed buildings that are recorded in the National Heritage List for England. Of these, one is listed at Grade II*, the middle of the three grades, and the others are at Grade II, the lowest grade. The parish contains the village of Raskelf and the surrounding area. The listed buildings consist of a church, a cross shaft in the churchyard, a milepost, a pinfold and a barn.

== Key ==
Grade	Criteria
II*	Particularly important buildings of more than special interest
II	Buildings of national importance and special interest

== Buildings ==
Name and location	Photograph	Date	Notes	Grade
St Mary's Church; 54.13042°N 1.25251°W		12th century	The church has been altered and extended through the centuries, including a restoration in 1879 by Ewan Christian. The body of the church is built in sandstone with a stone slate roof, and consists of a nave, north and south aisles, and a chancel with a north chapel. The west tower is weatherboarded, on a rusticated stone plinth, with a shingled top and a tiled pyramidal roof.	II*
Cross shaft 54.13029°N 1.25242°W		Late medieval (probable)	The cross shaft is in the churchyard of St Mary's Church, to the south of the church. It consists of a square stone shaft with chamfers, on a square sloped base.	II
Upper Farm Barn; 54.13170°N 1.25037°W	—	17th century (or earlier)	The threshing barn, later used for other purposes, has a timber framed core, and is encased in brick, the lower parts in red brick, and the upper parts in pinkish-brown brick containing diaper-shaped vents It has a swept French tile roof, four bays, an aisle, and opposing wagon doors.	II
Pinfold; 54.13277°N 1.24870°W		Late 18th century (probable)	The pinfold is in reddish-brown brick with stone coping, and has a cobbled floor with a central drain. There is an octagonal plan, and it has an embattled parapet with angle piers. There is an arched entrance and two arched openings, with iron gates and bars.	II
Milepost; 54.14815°N 1.23841°W		19th century	The milepost on the east side of the A19 road is in cast iron with lettering in relief. It has a triangular plan and a sloping top. On the top is the distance to London, on the left face the distance to Easingwold, and on the right face to Thirsk.	II
