= Copgrove =

Village and civil parish in North Yorkshire, England

Coordinates: 54°03′51″N 1°28′28″W

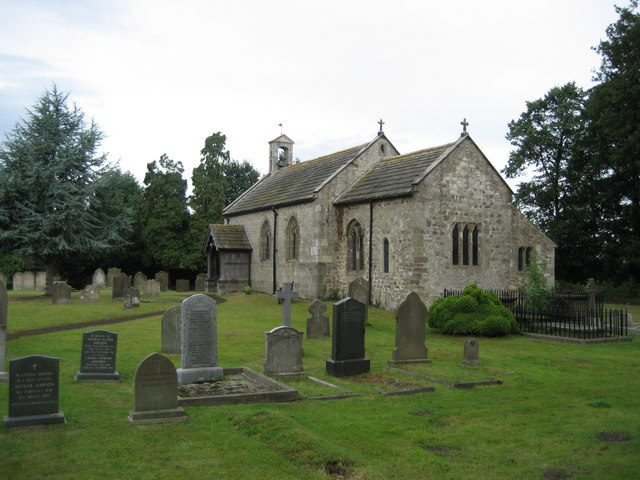
- St Michaels and All Angels church in Copgrove

- Location within North Yorkshire
- Population: 137 (2011)
- OS grid reference: SE 35412 62819
- Civil parish: Copgrove
- Unitary authority: North Yorkshire
- Ceremonial county: North Yorkshire
- Region: Yorkshire and the Humber
- Country: England
- Sovereign state: United Kingdom
- Post town: HARROGATE
- Postcode district: HG3
- Dialling code: 01423
- Police: North Yorkshire
- Fire: North Yorkshire
- Ambulance: Yorkshire

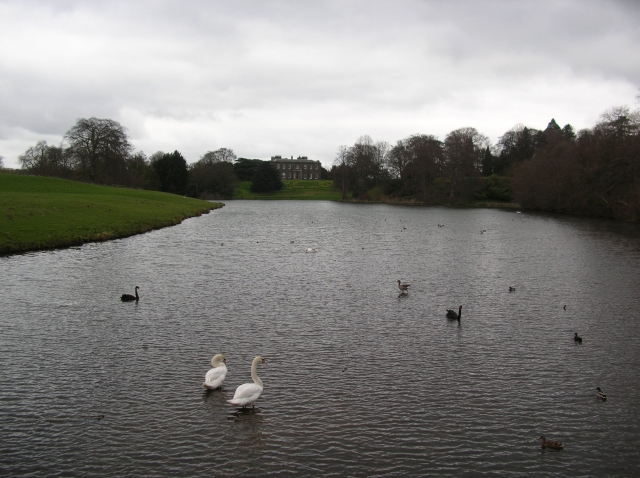
Looking north across the lake to Copgrove Hall

Copgrove is a village and civil parish in the county of North Yorkshire, England, five miles (8 km) south-west of Boroughbridge and the A1(M) motorway. The village is close to Rober Beck, which has been influenced by glaciers and overflowing channels.

Copgrove was described in 1870–72 as:

Pop., 68. Houses, 14. The property is all in one estate. Copgrove Hall is the seat of T. Duncombe, Esq., and contains some good portraits.

The parish is made up of 1,000 acres (400 ha) of land. The surface is hilly with a single stream running through it, a tributary of the Ure, which separates Copgrove from the parish of Burton-Leonard.

Until 1974 it was part of the West Riding of Yorkshire. From 1974 to 2023 it was part of the Craven District, it is now administered by the unitary North Yorkshire Council.

== History ==
The original Old English definition of Copgrove is split up into the 'Cop' and the 'grove' part 'cop meant personal name and the 'grove' part literally means grove, suggesting that the area is a landscapes consisting of woods and many small groups of trees.

In 1309 Archbishop William de Greenfield of York passed through Copgrove. The parish mainly consisted of the Hall, the Church and a well that has been discovered. The Holy Well is on a public footpath which runs from Copgrove village through the fields belonging to Copgrove Hall: a large cistern that had been let into the course of an underground stream. History shows that the well was thought to be usable again as a sacred healing bathing place. People came to seek a cure for their ills in the miraculous waters of St Mungo's Well.

== Population ==
The Domesday Book describes Copgrove as having a total population of "7 households" and "7 villagers". The total tax assessed was "6 geld units" which is quite large compared to the population. The land available was split between the population as land for the "Lord's plough team", and a separate part for the "mens plough team" and one church in the Parish. The Lord in 1066 was Gospatric son of Arnketil and in 1086 it was Turseten.

In 1835 the population of Copgrove was recorded at 97 inhabitants.

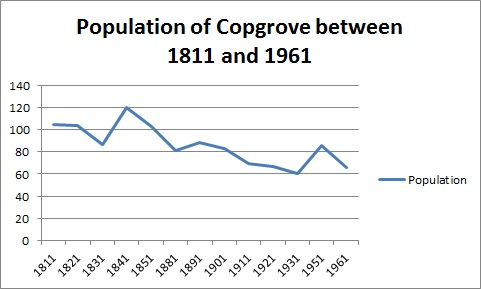
Population of Copgrove, 1811 to 1961

Between 1811 and 1961 records of the population of Copgrove are available and these show that from 1811 the population remained fairly constant for the next 10 years before making a dip to 87 in 1931. 1940 had the biggest increase in population rising to 120 inhabitants. After 1891 the population of the Parish continued to decrease down to its lowest number of 60 in 1931. In 1951 however the population was recorded at 86. This could have been because of the baby boom that occurred between the late 1940s and early 1960s.

According to the 2011 census Copgrove had a population of 137.

== Occupational structure ==
The 1831 census records show that the social classes of the population were dependent on the occupational statistics available for the parish and below is a pie chart that shows how the occupational statistics are broken down. However, the census only provided statistics showing the occupations of males aged over 20 years. The occupations that actually had numerical evidence were as follows: Farmers employing labourers, Farmers not employing labourers, Agricultural labourers, Retail and Hand Crafts and Capitalists, Professionals.

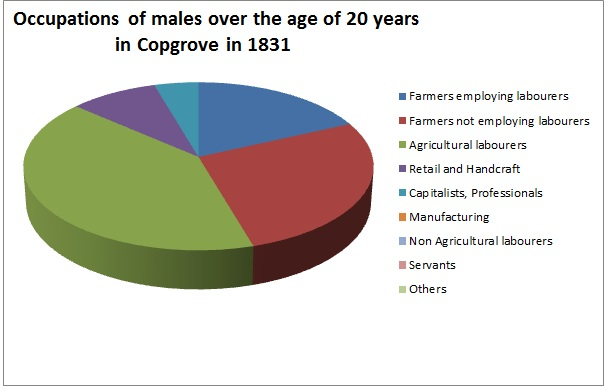
Pie chart of occupational statistics for males aged over 20 years in Copgrove in 1831

In 1881 the presentation of occupational data changed to show both male and female and percentages of the population that worked in each occupational sector. This was done by using the '24 orders' published in 1881 reports.

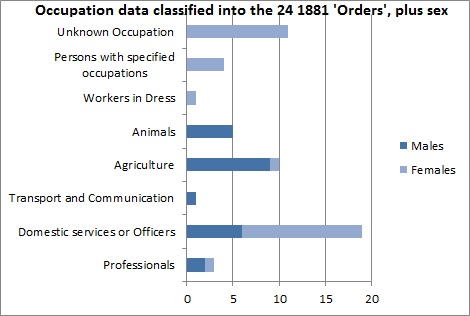
Occupational statistics for both males and females in Copgrove in 1881

== St Michaels and All Angels ==
St Michael's Church, Copgrove is a rectory that has been dedicated to St Michael, the deanery of Bouroughbridge. In 2011 the latest record showed that within the church 1584–1812 baptisms, 1587–1966 marriages, and 1584–1812 burials had taken place. This comes from the North Yorkshire County Records Office.

Within the St Michael's Church there is the 'Devil Stone' located in the north-east corner of the church. The stone has a rubbing on it of a figure that has been identified as the figure of Sheela-na-gig; the Celtic Goddess of Creation and Destruction and the female is seen to be holding her vagina open with her left hand, while holding an object in her right hand. P.D. Hartley has previously suggested looks like a head. It has been claimed that this figure carving in the stone is

"symbolising more than simply the return of all life to the Otherworld womb of the Universal Mother"

Whilst it has been viewed that the head is about to replaced back into the womg form which it was first created.

== See also ==
- Listed buildings in Copgrove
