= Great North of England Railway =

Great North of England Railway Act 1842
- Act of Parliament
- Parliament of the United Kingdom
- Long title: An Act for the Abandonment of a Portion of the Line of the Great North of England Railway, and for altering and amending the Acts relating thereto.
- Citation: 5 & 6 Vict. c. lxxxiv

Dates
- Royal assent: 18 June 1842

Text of statute as originally enacted

The Great North of England Railway (GNER) was an early British railway company. Its main line, opened in 1841 was between York and Darlington, and originally it was planned to extend to Newcastle.

== Mergers ==
Great North of England Railway Company's Purchase Act 1846
- Act of Parliament
- Parliament of the United Kingdom
- Long title: An Act for enabling the Great North of England Railway Company to lease and also to sell their Railway to the Newcastle and Darlington Junction Railway Company; and to authorize the raising of additional Money by the said last-mentioned Company for those and other Purposes.
- Citation: 9 & 10 Vict. c. ccxlii

Dates
- Royal assent: 27 July 1846

Under the Great North of England Railway Company's Purchase Act 1846 (9 & 10 Vict. c. ccxlii) it was absorbed by the Newcastle and Darlington Junction Railway. Soon afterwards, the combined company was renamed the York and Newcastle Railway. In 1847, this amalgamated with the Newcastle and Berwick Railway to form the York, Newcastle and Berwick Railway and this amalgamated with other railways in 1854 to form the North Eastern Railway (NER).

== Locomotives ==
Locomotive list

Name	Wheels	Builder	Date introduced	GNER no.	NER no.	Comments
Swift	0-4-0	R & W Hawthorn	1836	-	-	Bought by GNER from Stockton & Darlington Railway, 1839
Planet	2-2-0	Robert Stephenson and Company	1830	-	-	Bought by GNER, 1839
Tees	2-4-0	R & W Hawthorn	1839	-	-	
Newcastle	2-4-0	Charles Tayleur and Company	1839	-	59	
Auckland	2-4-0	Charles Tayleur and Company	1839	-	60	
Bedale	2-4-0	Charles Tayleur and Company	1839	-	14	
Edinburgh	2-4-0	Charles Tayleur and Company	1839	-	62	
Carlisle	2-4-0	Charles Tayleur and Company	1839	-	63	
Manchester	2-4-0	Charles Tayleur and Company	1839	-	64	
Victoria	2-2-2	R & W Hawthorn	1839	-	67	
Leeds	2-2-2	R & W Hawthorn	1839	-	68	
Wensleydale	2-2-2	R & W Hawthorn	1839	-	40	
Ouse	2-2-2	R & W Hawthorn	1839	-	69	

Notes

1. GNER = Great North of England Railway
2. NER = North Eastern Railway
3. Names and NER numbers may not be in correct order (source is vague)
