= Pickering Lythe =

Ancient division of North Yorkshire, England

Pickering Lythe Dic (Domesday survey name)
- Wapentake
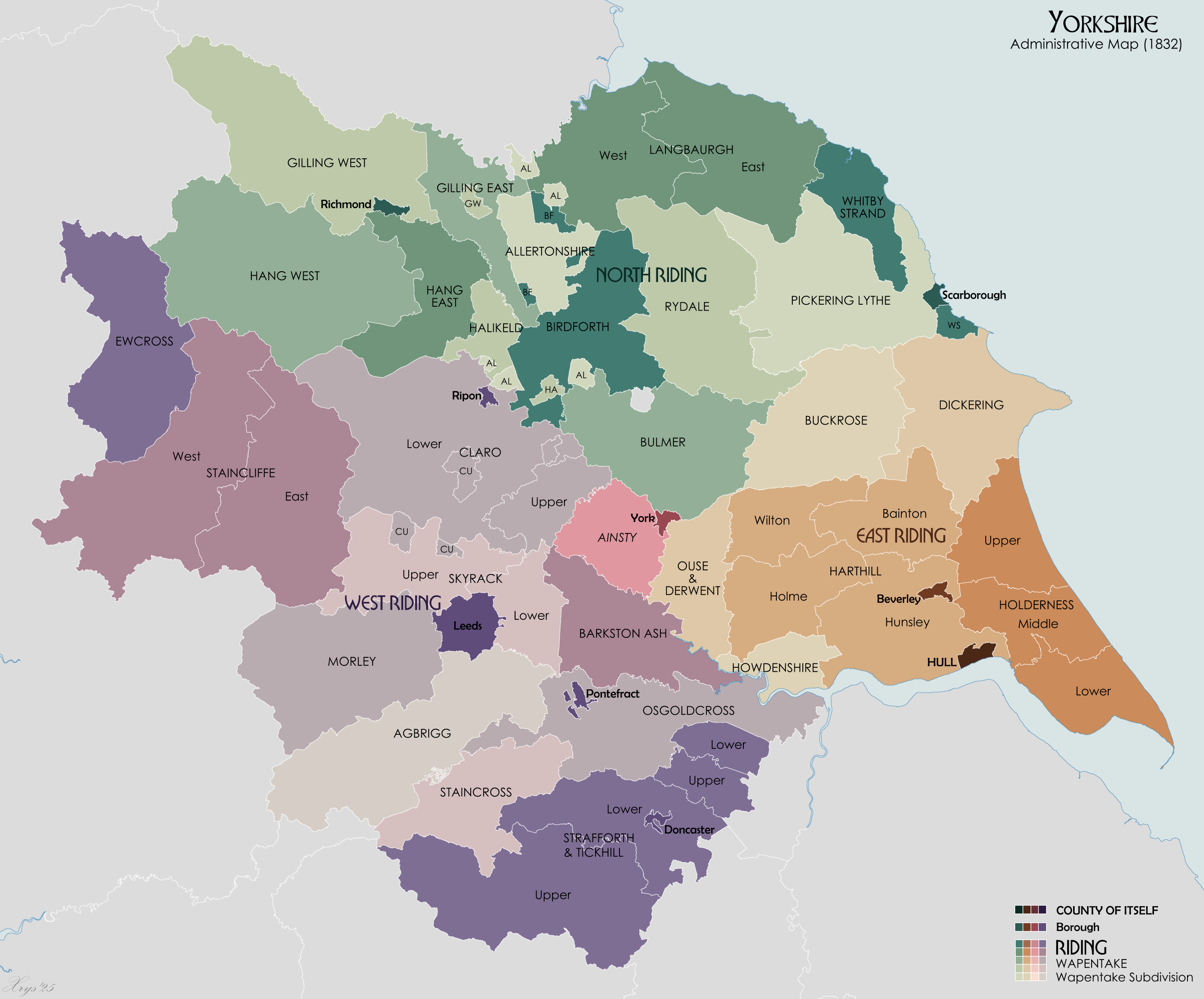
- Pickering Lythe is the very light green section on the coast, speared by Whitby Strand
- Area
  - 1831: 141,970 acres (57,450 ha)
  - Coordinates: 54.290°N 0.780°W
- Population
  - 1831: 15,319
- History
  - Created: 1086 (as Dic)
- Status: Defunct
- Government
  - Type: Hundred (county division)

Pickering Lythe was one of twelve wapentakes within the historical county of the North Riding of Yorkshire, England. It was recognised within the Domesday Book as Dic, an area covering the Vale of Pickering, and swathes of land east towards the North Yorkshire coast.

== History ==
Originally, the wapentake's name was Dic, which is how it is recorded in the Domesday Book. However, Kirkby Misperton and Sinnington were in Maneshou (Ryedale Wapentake), and Hackness was in the wapentake of Whitby Strand. Smith suggests that the original name of Dic means a dyke, the original meeting place of the wapentake. Later, it was changed to Pickering Lythe, with the meeting place being a slope near to Pickering (though the exact site is lost); Lythe having the same meaning as Lythe on the North Yorkshire coast - a slope. Dickering is also thought to be so-named after a dyke, and the old wapentake of Dickering bordered Pickering Lythe to the south. The name wapentake derives from the Old Norse of vápnatak, which means "a vote of consent expressed by waving or brandishing weapons" - literally weapon-take. It was one of twelve wapentakes within the old county of the North Riding of Yorkshire. (Note: Allertonshire, Birdforth, Bulmer, Gilling East, Gilling West, Hallikeld, Hang East, Hang West, Langbaurgh, Pickering Lythe, Ryedale, and Whitby Strand.)

The wapentake was tied to the manor of Pickering, and was historically labelled simply as Pickering Wapentake, later with Lithe, and then Lythe being added. The inhabitants of the wapentake who were expected to meet and take up weapons were known locally as Lythsmen [sic]. During the Harrying of the North between 1069 and 1070, much of the area of what became the wapentake was laid to waste and depopulated, so much so that it was no longer labelled as a hundred (or wapentake). (Note: In the Domesday survey, most of the wapentake was in the king's hands (William the Conqueror) as it had been depopulated.) Pickering Lythe was bordered by the wapentakes of Langbaurgh to the north, Whitby Strand and the North Sea to the east, Dickering and Buckrose to the south, and Ryedale to the west.

The population of the wapentake was recorded in 1823 as being 15,232, and in 1831 as being 15,319. The census of 1831, determined that the wapentake covered an area of 144,730 acres (58,570 ha) and had a population of 24,079, however, this included the Scarborough parish and borough, which was separate to the wapentake of Pickering Lythe. (Note: Scarborough parish and borough had a population of 8,760, which means the population of the wapentake in 1831 was 15,319, as reported in the citation above. Additionally, the acreage of would be reduced by 2,760 acres (1,120 ha) for Scarborough, leaving 141,970 acres (57,450 ha) for the wapentake.) A boundary committee, sitting in 1885, apportioned large swathes of Pickering Lythe into the newly created Whitby Division, based on the old petty sessional divisions of Ryedale, Whitby Strand and of Pickering.

== Settlements ==
Pickering Lythe Wapentake shaded in red

The wapentake contained 48 settlements within the following parishes; Allerston, Brompton, Cayton, Ebberston, Ellerburn, Hutton Bushel, Kirkby Misperton, Levisham, Middleton, Pickering, Scalby, Seamer, Sinnington, Thornton Dale, and Wykeham. Parts of the parish of Filey, which straddled the border between the East and North Ridings, was in Pickering Lythe, and in the wapentake of Dickering. This also extended to the church at Filey, which was separated from Filey itself by a ravine. By 1830, the wapentake was listed as having 37 townships, and was designated as principally an upland wapentake (along with Gilling West, Hang West, Langbaurgh, Ryedale and Whitby Strand).

Although replaced by a poor law union by 1893, the settlements below are listed as having been in the wapentake of Pickering Lythe at that time.

- Aislaby
- Allerston
- Barughs-Ambo, (Barugh (Great and Little))
- Brompton
- Burniston
- Cawthorne
- Cayton
- Cloughton
- Cropton
- East Ayton
- Ebberston
- Ellerburn
- Farmanby (in the parish of Ellerburn-cum-Farmanby)
- Goatland
- Great Habton
- Gristhorpe
- Hartoft
- Hutton Bushell, (Hutton Buscel)
- Irton
- Kingthorpe (a hamlet 3 miles (4.8 km) north-east of Pickering)
- Kirkby Misperton, (Kirby Misperton)
- Levisham
- Lebberston
- Little Habton
- Lockton
- Marishes
- Marton
- Middleton
- Newby
- Newton (part of Scalby)
- Osgodby
- Pickering
- Rosedale East Side, (Rosedale)
- Ryton
- Sawdon
- Scalby
- Seamer
- Sinnington
- Snainton
- Stainton Dale, (Staintondale)
- Thornton Dale
- Thoxenby, (Throxenby)
- Troutsdale (a valley west of Scalby, and north of Wykeham)
- West Ayton
- Wilton
- Wrelton
- Wykeham
