= Ellerburn-cum-Farmanby =

Former parish in North Yorkshire, England

Coordinates: 54.244°N 0.714°W

- History
  - Abolished: 1866
  - Succeeded by: Thornton
- Status: civil parish

Ellerburn cum Farmanby (sometimes Ellerburn) is a former civil parish in what is now the county of North Yorkshire, England. Parts of the parish straddled the road between Pickering and Thornton Dale, with the church of St Hilda, Ellerburn, being in the north of the former parish. The land of the former parish is now contained within the civil parish of Thornton Dale. (Note: The village, and parish are known as Thornton-le-Dale, whereas, throughout the 19th century, it was just Thornton Dale. The older name is retained as this is reflected in the source material.)

== History ==
Ellerburn existed as a separate parish on the west side of Thornton Parish until 1866, when it was subsumed into the present larger parish of Thornton Dale. (Note: In 1872, the area was still being described as Ellerburn Parish, and the population statistics for Wilton started in 1881 as a separate parish.) Both Ellerburn and Farmanby exist as place names within the Domesday Book, though in the 19th century, Farmanby was a township, and Ellerburn lent its name to the parish, but there was no actual settlement called Ellerburn, only a small number of farms in the dale which collectively are called Ellerburn. Ellerburn means Alder Stream translated from a mixture of Old English and Old Norse, and Farmanby means Farman's Farm from Old Norse. The parish also contained the settlement of Wilton, which was separated from the rest of the parish by the parish of Thornton Dale, which led to Wilton being described as detached. Farmanby and Ellerburn had been described as being in the same area as far back as 1316, and the parish was sometimes simply labelled as Ellerburn. The parish boundaries ran alongside the western and southern edges of Thornton Dale, and then the long section of land to the south-east of Thornton Dale, which would become Wilton Parish, was part of Ellerburn too.

Farmanby was recorded as being a township, and included various parts of the village of Thornton-le-Dale. Wilton was described as a chapelry, as it had an Anglican chapel; which was a chapel of ease to the church in Ellerburn. All of these areas were within the wapentake of Pickering Lythe, and then Pickering Rural District. Wilton became its own parish when Ellerburn was broken up, and remains so today.

The land in the parish was host to several quarries, and the topography gently rose from 70 feet (21 m) above sea level in the south of the parish (near to the River Derwent) and reached a height of 550 feet (170 m) in the northern parts. The land around the parish was owned by the Deans and Canons of St George's Chapel, Windsor since the early 16th century. It was prime arable land and had seen widespread agricultural use before the events of the English Civil Wars.

The name of Ellerburn has been described as an oddity, as the normal description of streams in the area has been with the suffix of beck. Jeffery notes that it should be Ellerbeck, meaning the stream of the alders. The small valley above Thornton Dale (through which Thornton Beck flows) was full of alder trees, providing employment for cloggers who used the alder wood to make clogs. The stream of Thornton Beck supported two paper mills, and a bleach mill which was opposite the church of St Hilda.

== See also ==
- Church of St Hilda, Ellerburn
