= Old Grammar School, Thornton-le-Dale =

School building in North Yorkshire, England

Coordinates: 54.2368°N 0.7193°W

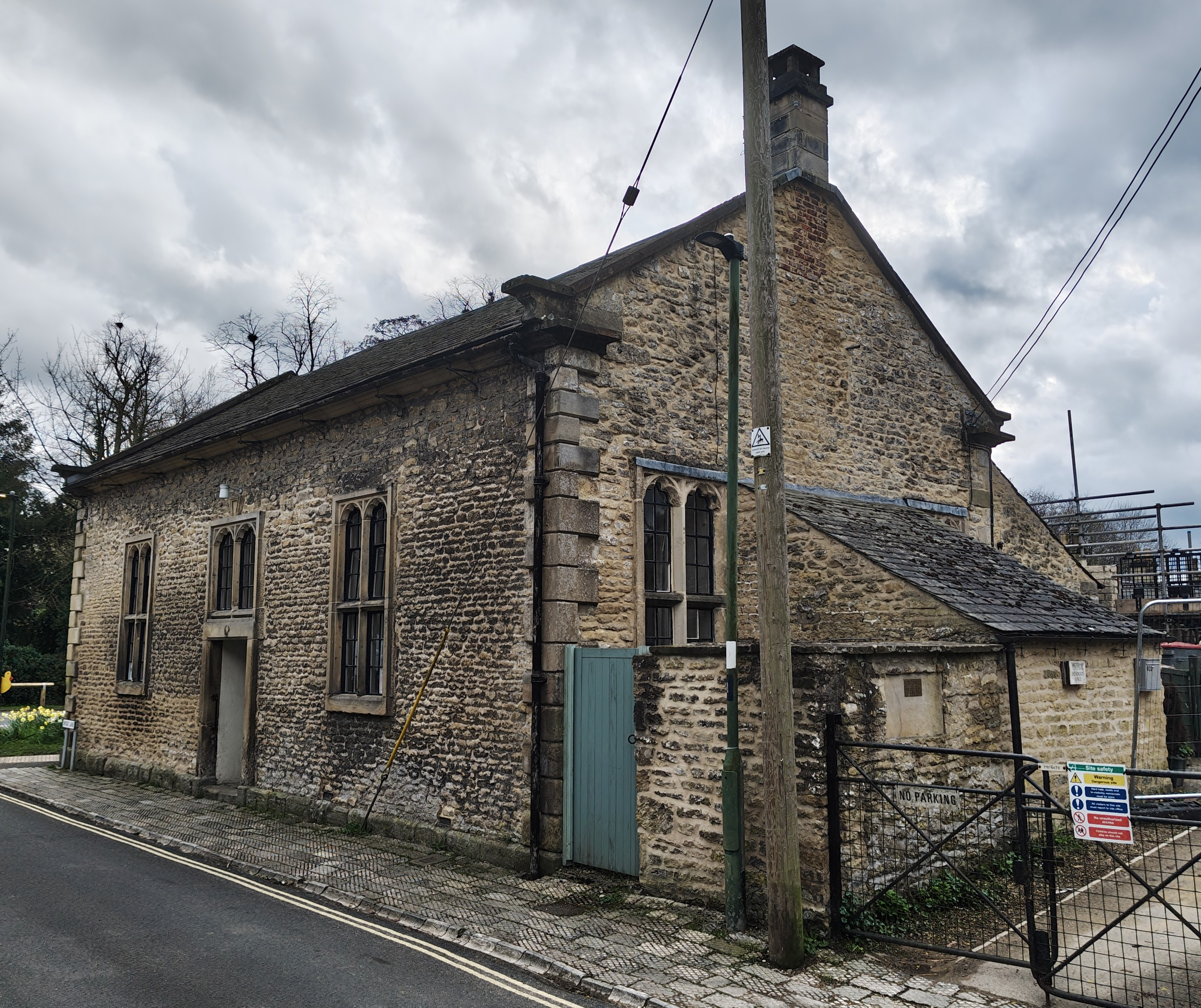
The building, in 2026

The Old Grammar School is a historic building in Thornton-le-Dale, a village in North Yorkshire, in England.

The grammar school was endowed by Lady Elizabeth Lumley, and was completed in 1670, alongside the neighbouring Lady Lumley's Almshouses. The building was heavily restored in the 19th century, but the school closed in 1905, being merged into Lady Lumley's School in nearby Pickering. The building has since been used as a village hall. It has been grade II listed since 1953.

The building is constructed of sandstone on a plinth, with chamfered quoins, an attic band, a mouded eaves cornice, and a stone flag rood with coped gables and shaped kneelers. It has a single storey and an attic, and a rectangular plan, with extensions at the rear. On the gable end facing the street is a round-headed Perpendicular window with a hood mould, above which is a recessed round-headed bell opening. The right return has three bays. In the centre is a doorway, above which is a two-light mullioned window, and these are flanked by two-light mullioned and transomed windows.

== See also ==
- Listed buildings in Thornton-le-Dale
