= St Chad's Church, Great Habton =

Church in Great Habton, North Yorkshire, England

Coordinates: 54°10′36″N 0°50′21″W

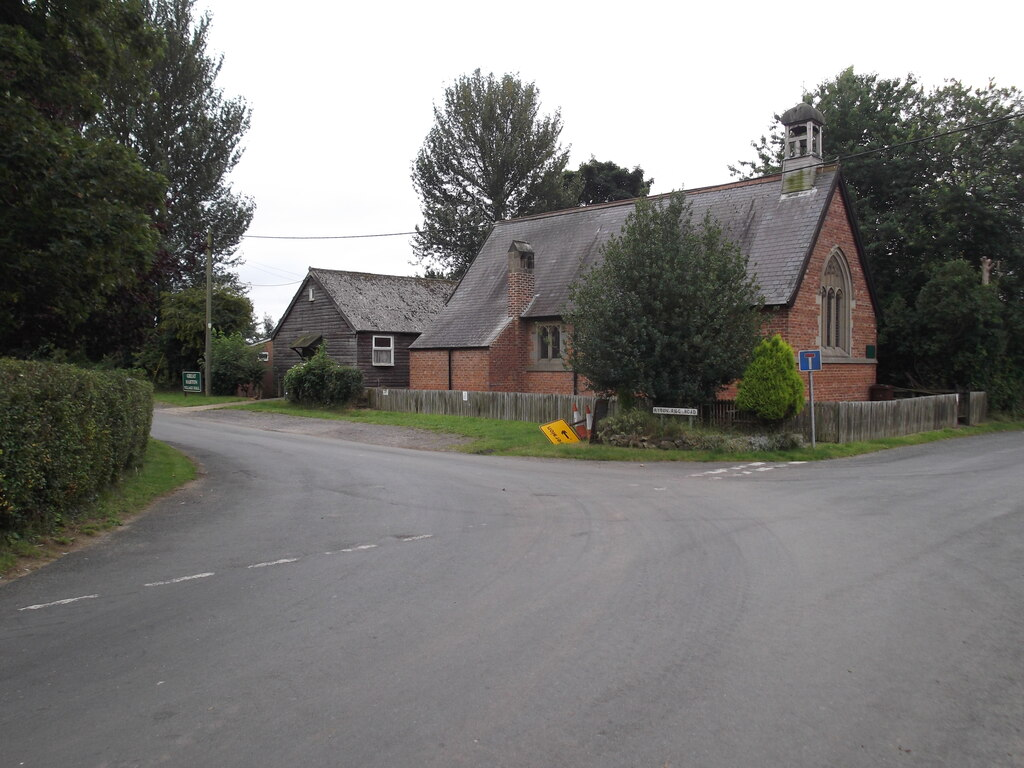
The church, in 2021

St Chad's Church is an Anglican church in Great Habton, a village in North Yorkshire, in England.

Great Habton lies in the parish of St Laurence's Church, Kirby Misperton. In 1884, a church was constructed in the village, to a design by C. Hodgson Fowler. The bellcote and bell were restored in 2015, at a cost of £14,000.

The church is in the 14th-century Gothic style and is built of red brick and stone. It consists of a nave and chancel. It has a small timber bellcote at one end, with a single bell.
