= Listed buildings in Wilton, Ryedale =

Wilton is a civil parish in the county of North Yorkshire, England. It contains two listed buildings that are recorded in the National Heritage List for England. Both the listed buildings are designated at Grade II, the lowest of the three grades, which is applied to "buildings of national importance and special interest". The parish contains the village of Wilton and the surrounding area, and the listed buildings consist of a farmhouse and a church.

== Buildings ==
Name and location	Photograph	Date	Notes
Prospect Farmhouse; 54.23526°N 0.68280°W	—	Mid-18th century	The farmhouse is in sandstone with a pantile roof. There are two storeys, three bays and a rear wing. The doorway has a rectangular fanlight, and the windows are sashes, those in the upper floor piercing the eaves, forming shallow raked dormers.
St George's Church; 54.23305°N 0.67935°W		1907–08	The church was designed by C. Hodgson Fowler and completed in 1920. It is built in stone with dressings in sandstone and limestone, and has a Westmorland slate roof. The church consists of a nave, north and south aisles, and a chancel; each aisle has two gabled bays. The west end is in brick, and has tower footings and a half-timbered porch, both with slate roofs, and above is a projecting wooden bell turret.
