= Thornton-le-Dale Market Cross =

Market cross in Thornton-le-Dale, North Yorkshire, England

Coordinates: 54.2361°N 0.7217°W

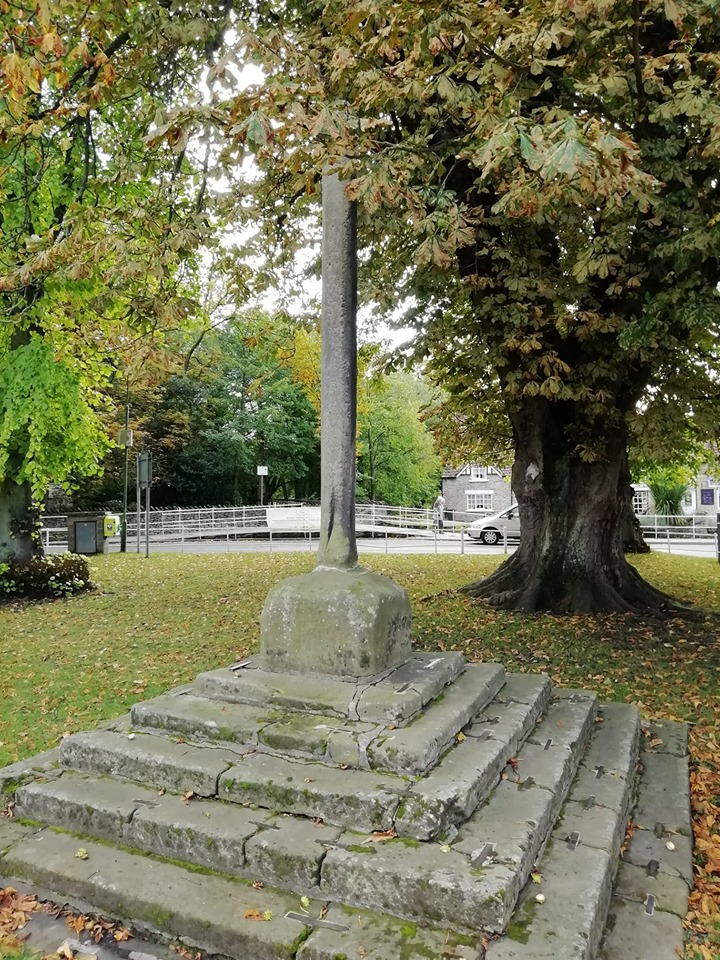
The structure, in 2019

Thornton-le-Dale Market Cross is a historic structure in Thornton-le-Dale, a village in North Yorkshire, in England.

The village was granted a market charter in 1281. At some point in the Mediaeval period, a market cross was erected in the square in the middle of the village. It would originally have been capped by a carved cross, but at some point that was replaced by a ball. The cross was restored in 1820, and was grade II listed in 1953.

The cross is constructed of limestone. It consists of a tapering octagonal shaft on a tall square pedestal, on six square stone steps.

== See also ==
- Listed buildings in Thornton-le-Dale
