= The Hall, Thornton-le-Dale =

Building in Thornton-le-Dale, North Yorkshire, England

Coordinates: 54.2364°N 0.7183°W

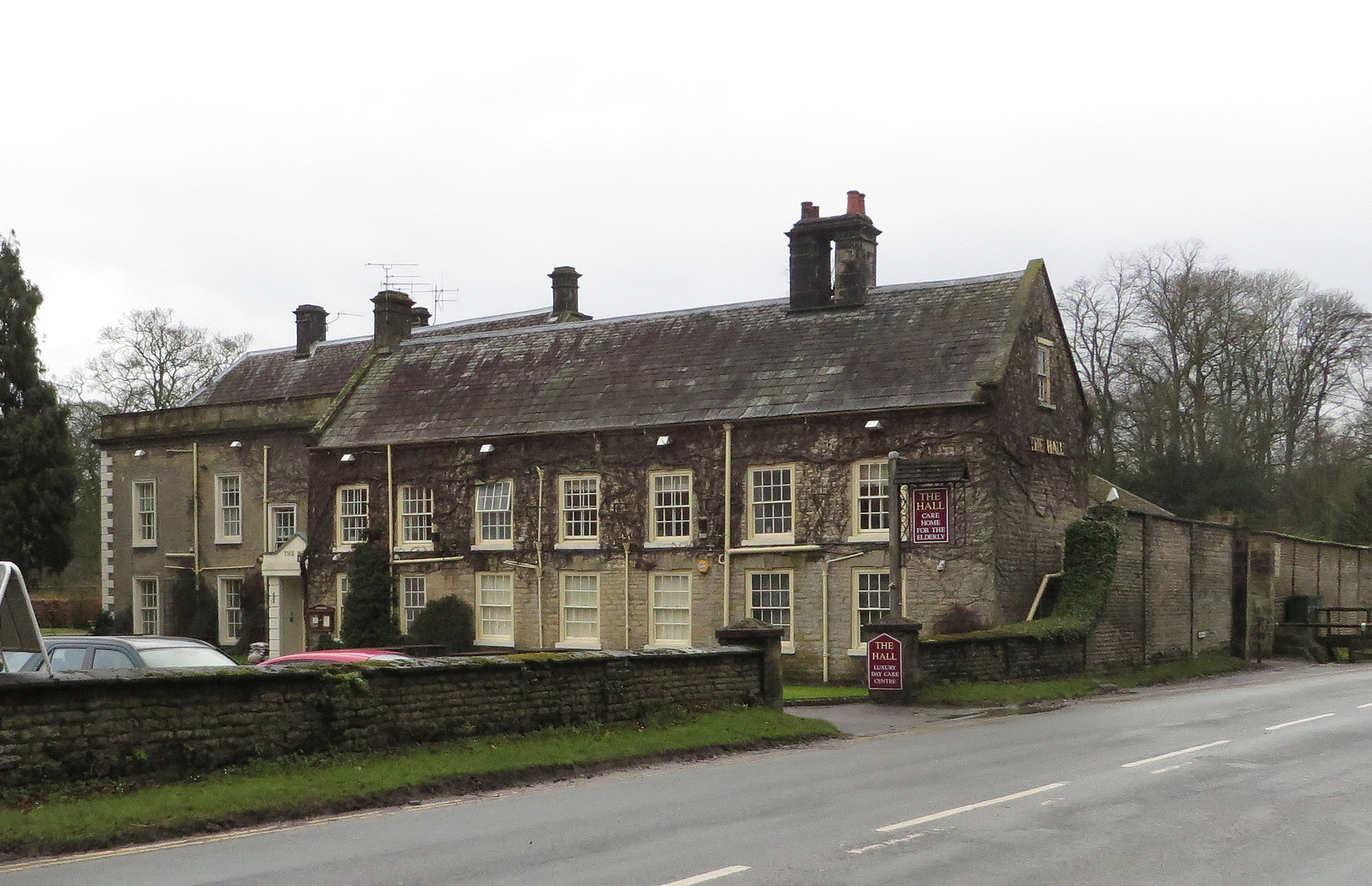
The building, in 2014

The Hall is a historic building in Thornton-le-Dale, a village in North Yorkshire, in England.

A house on the site was first recorded in 1335, but it was in ruins by 1380. The current building may contain some mediaeval material, but it largely dates from about 1680. The main front was redesigned in the 18th century, and a service wing was added late that century. In the early 19th century, the windows were altered and a porch was added, then the current entrance was added in the 20th century. The building was converted into a nursing home late that century, and was grade II* listed in 1953.

The building is constructed of sandstone on a plinth, with quoins and slate roofs. The garden front has two storeys, a central range of three bays, and flanking two-bay cross-wings with hipped roofs. In the centre is a Doric porch with a pediment, the windows are sashes in architraves, and at the top is a panelled parapet. The entrance front has a five-bay range, with a projecting seven-bay range to the right, and in the angle is a porch. The windows in the right range have lintels with keystones, and on the range is a bellcote. Inside, there is a 17th-century staircase with contemporary panelling, and a large 19th-century fireplace in the central ground floor room.

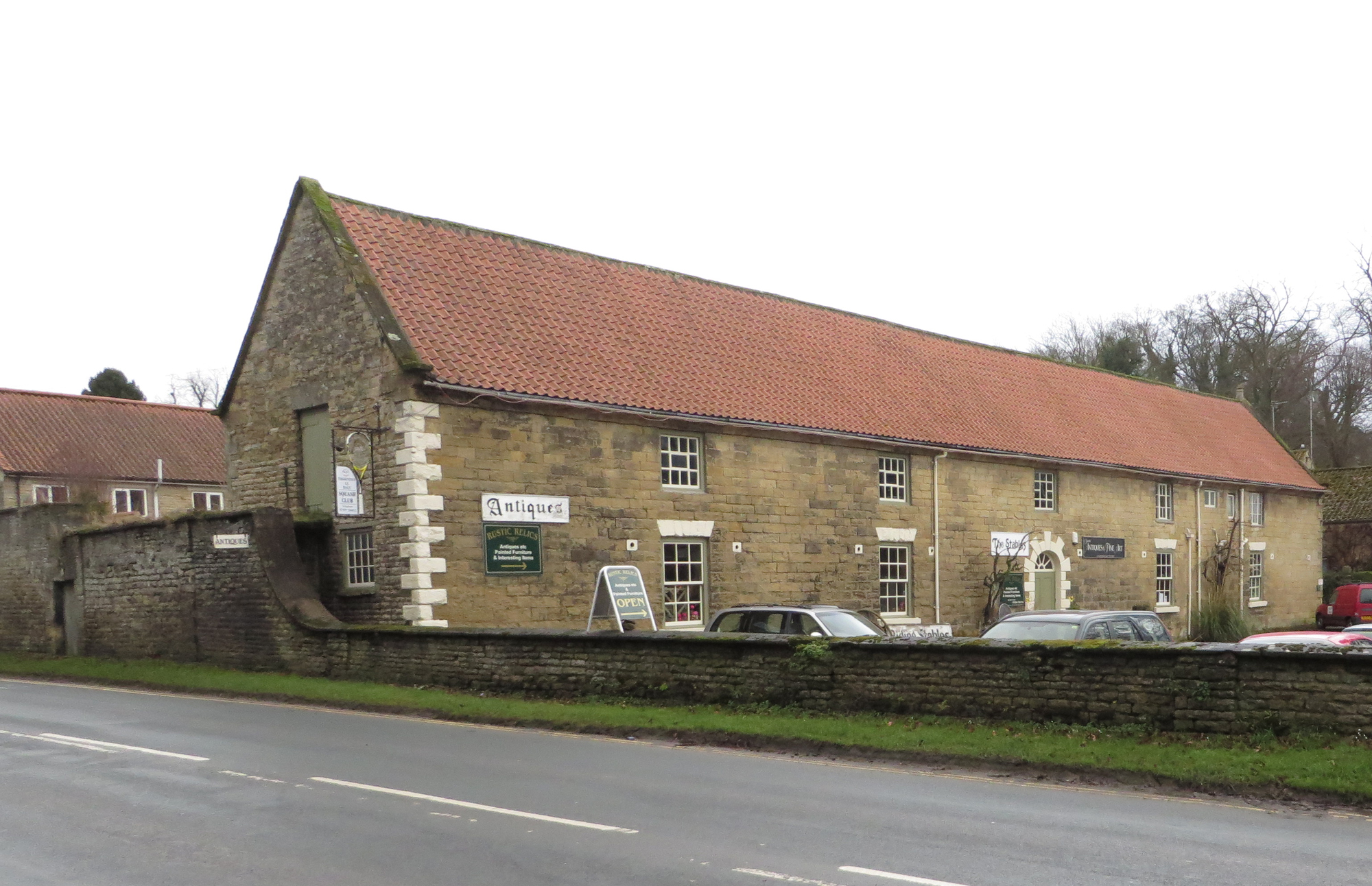
Former stables to the hall

The former stable block was completed in the early or mid 18th century, and is grade II listed. It is built of sandstone, with chamfered quoins, a moulded eaves course, and a pantile roof with coped gables and shaped kneelers. It has two storeys and is five bays wide. In the centre of the front is a round-arched doorway with quoins, voussoirs and a radial fanlight. On the ground floor are sash windows with flat arches of voussoirs, and the upper floor has various small windows. The rear has a carriage arch, doorways and pivoting windows, and on the gable end facing the street are external steps leading to a doorway.

== See also ==
- Grade II* listed buildings in North Yorkshire (district)
- Listed buildings in Thornton-le-Dale
