= Listed buildings in Thornton-le-Dale =

Thornton-le-Dale is a civil parish in the county of North Yorkshire, England. It contains 77 listed buildings that are recorded in the National Heritage List for England. Of these, three are listed at Grade II*, the middle of the three grades, and the others are at Grade II, the lowest grade. The parish contains the village of Thornton-le-Dale, the hamlet of Ellerburn and the surrounding countryside. Most of the listed buildings are houses, cottages and associated structures, farmhouses and farm buildings. The others include churches, shops, offices and cafés, a market cross, a former grammar school, a row of almshouses, a bridge and a public house.

== Key ==
Grade	Criteria
II*	Particularly important buildings of more than special interest
II	Buildings of national importance and special interest

== Buildings ==
Name and location	Photograph	Date	Notes	Grade
St Hilda's Church, Ellerburn; 54.24676°N 0.71028°W		11th century	The church has been altered and extended through the centuries, including renovations between 1902 and 1907 by W. D. Caröe. It is built in sandstone, partly on a plinth, with quoins, and a stone flag roof. The church consists of a three-bay nave, a south porch, a chancel and a north vestry. At the west end is a bellcote carried on two piers with chamfered bases.	II*
All Saints' Church; 54.23702°N 0.71547°W		Early 14th century	The tower dates from the late 14th century, alterations were made to the body of the church in 1865–66, and the porch was added in 1900. The church is built in sandstone with a stone flagged roof, and consists of a nave, north and south aisles, a south porch, a chancel and vestry, and a west tower. The tower has four stages, diagonal buttresses, string courses, and a west window with a pointed arch, three lights and a hood mould. On the second stage are clock faces, the bell openings have two lights, and above is an embattled parapet with crocketed pinnacles.	II*
Market cross 54.23619°N 0.72176°W		Medieval	The market cross in The Square is in limestone. It consists of a tapering octagonal shaft on a tall square pedestal, on six square stone steps.	II
Car park walls 54.23601°N 0.71998°W		16th century (possible)	Originally the kitchen garden walls to The Hall, they enclose the car park on three sides. The inner side is in blue and red brick, and the outer side is in sandstone on a plinth. The walls have piers and coping, they are about 3 metres (9.8 ft) in height, and are ramped up in places.	II
Apple Blossom Cottage; 54.23730°N 0.71345°W		17th century	The house is in sandstone, with quoins on the left, and a pantile roof. There is a single storey and an attic, and two bays. The central doorway is flanked by horizontally sliding sash windows, and a there is a small similar window to the left. In the attic are two raking dormers with casements.	II
Appletree Farmhouse; 54.23727°N 0.71356°W		17th century	The farmhouse has a cruck framed core, it is encased in limestone and raised in sandstone, and has a pantile roof. There are two low storeys, two bays, and a single-story lean-to on the left. The doorway is on the lean-to, the windows are horizontally sliding sashes, and on the left is a fire window. Inside, there are two pairs of full crucks.	II
Beck Isle Cottage; 54.23723°N 0.71854°W		17th century	The house has a cruck framed core, it is encased in sandstone, and has a stepped eaves course and a thatched roof. There is one storey and an attic, three bays, and a later rear wing. On the left bay is a projecting bracketed thatched porch, and the windows are horizontally sliding sashes, those in the attic in eyebrow dormers. Inside, three pairs of jointed crucks have survived.	II
Box Tree House; 54.23121°N 0.72292°W	—	17th century	The house is in sandstone with a pantile roof. The main range has two storeys and three bays, and to the left is a wing with one storey and two bays. The doorway is in the wing, the windows are horizontally sliding sashes, and on the main range is a fire window.	II
Church Farmhouse and cottage 54.23696°N 0.71388°W		17th century	The house and attached byre, later converted into a cottage, are in limestone with a French tile roof. The main block has two storeys and two bays, and the lower wing to the right has one storey and two bays. The doorway is in the wing, the main block contains two fire windows and horizontally sliding sash windows, and the windows in the wing are later insertions. Inside, there are two pairs of full jointed crucks.	II
Cruck Cottage and outbuilding 54.23174°N 0.72284°W		17th century	A house with an outbuilding on the right with a cruck framed core, they are enclosed in limestone, and have pantile roofs. The house has a single storey and attic and three bays, and the outbuilding has one storey and four bays. On the front of the house is a doorway, horizontally sliding sash windows, fixed windows including a fire window, and two raking dormers. On the outbuilding are a doorway and a small window. Inside, there is a single pair of raised jointed crucks, an inglenook fireplace, and some lath and plaster infill.	II
Old Bar Cottage; 54.23736°N 0.71330°W		17th century	The cottage has a cruck framed core, it is encased in sandstone, and has a pantile roof. There is one storey and an attic, and two bays. The doorway is in the centre, the ground floor windows are horizontally sliding sashes, and on the attic are two raking dormers with casements.	II
York House; 54.23798°N 0.71072°W		17th century (probable)	The house has a cruck framed core, it is encased in sandstone, with quoins on the right, and a pantile roof. There are two storeys, three bays, and a rear room. On the front is a doorway, flanked by five-light casement windows, the left one bowed, and the other windows are horizontally sliding sash windows. Inside, there is one pair of jointed full crucks.	II
Grammar School; 54.23683°N 0.71934°W		1670	The grammar school, later used for other purposes, is in sandstone on a plinth, with chamfered quoins, an attic band, a mouded eaves cornice, and a stone flag rood with coped gables and shaped kneelers. There is a single storey and an attic, and a rectangular plan, with extensions at the rear. On the gable end facing the street is a round-headed Perpendicular window with a hood mould, above which is a recessed round-headed bell opening. The right return has three bays. In the centre is a doorway, above which is a two-light mullioned window, and these are flanked by two-light mullioned and transomed windows.	II
Lady Lumley's Almshouses; 54.23676°N 0.71986°W		1670	A row of twelve almshouses, which have been restored, in limestone, with a moulded eaves cornice, and a stone flag roof. There is one storey, 24 bays and later rear extensions. The doorways are paired and have plain surrounds, and the windows have two lights with cinquefoil heads and stone surrounds. In the centre is an inscribed tablet.	II
Old Ellers and outbuilding 54.24665°N 0.70956°W	—	Late 17th century	A vicarage, later a private house and outbuilding, it is in limestone, with quoins on the left, and a French tile roof. There are two storeys and four bays, and a single-storey single-bay outbuilding on the right. On the front is a doorway with a fixed-light fire window to its left, and the other windows are horizontally sliding sashes. The outbuilding has a plank door, and at the rear are three brick buttresses.	II
The Hall; 54.23647°N 0.71830°W		c. 1680	A large house, which has been extended, it is in sandstone on a plinth, with quoins and slate roofs. The garden front has two storeys, a central range of three bays, and flanking two-bay cross-wings with hipped roofs. In the centre is a Doric porch with a pediment, the windows are sashes in architraves, and at the top is a panelled parapet. The entrance front has a five-bay range, with a projecting seven-bay range to the right, and in the angle is a porch. The windows in the right range have lintels with keystones, and on the range is a bellcote.	II*
Brooklet House; 54.23230°N 0.72244°W		Early 18th century	The cottage is in sandstone with a pantile roof. There are two storeys and two bays. On the right is a gabled porch, and the windows are horizontally sliding sashes.	II
Cottage attached to left of The Little Cottage; 54.23748°N 0.71907°W		Early 18th century	A house with an outbuilding to the left converted for residential use, it is in sandstone, with a stepped eaves course, and a pantile roof. There are two storeys, the house has two bays, and the former outbuilding is slightly lower with one bay. On the front is a doorway, and the windows are horizontally sliding sashes.	II
Hall Garth Farmhouse; 54.22987°N 0.72474°W	—	Early 18th century	The farmhouse is in sandstone, with quoins, bracketed eaves and bargeboards, and a pantile roof. There is one storey and an attic, two bays, a single-storey extension to the right, and an outshut. On the front is a lean-to porch, and a doorway on the outshut. Most of the windows are horizontally sliding sashes, there is one later pivoting window, and a raking dormer.	II
Ivy Cottage; 54.23242°N 0.72240°W		Early 18th century	The cottage is in sandstone with a pantile roof. There are two storeys, and two bays. On the front, to the left, is a doorway, and the windows are horizontally sliding sashes.	II
Lyndale Cottage; 54.23713°N 0.71338°W		Early 18th century	The house is in sandstone with a stepped eaves course and a pantile roof. There are two storeys and three bays. On the front is a doorway, with a fire window to its right. The other ground floor windows are casements, and on the upper floor they are horizontally sliding sashes.	II
Pine Cottage; 54.23792°N 0.71106°W		Early 18th century	The house is in sandstone on a plinth, with a pantile roof. There are two storeys and two bays. The doorway, on the left, is approached by stone steps, and the windows are horizontally sliding sashes.	II
The Cottage; 54.23761°N 0.71171°W		Early 18th century	The house is in sandstone, partly rebuilt in brick, and has a pantile roof with a coped gable and a shaped kneeler on the right. There are two storeys and two bays, and an outshut. The doorway is in the centre, to its right is a sash window, to the left is a horizontally sliding sash, and further to the left is a fire window. The upper floor contains horizontally sliding sashes.	II
Nab Farmhouse; 54.23750°N 0.71235°W		Early to mid-18th century	The farmhouse is in sandstone with a pantile roof. There are two storeys and four bays. On the front is a doorway, and the windows are sashes, all but one horizontally sliding. All the windows have painted lintels.	II
The Riding Stables; 54.23654°N 0.71750°W		Early to mid-18th century	The former stable block to The Hall is in sandstone, with chamfered quoins, a moulded eaves course, and a pantile roof with coped gables and shaped kneelers. There are two storeys and five bays. In the centre of the front is a round-arched doorway with quoins, voussoirs and a radial fanlight. On the ground floor are sash windows with flat arches of voussoirs, and the upper floor has various small windows. The rear has a carriage arch, doorways and pivoting windows, and on the gable end facing the street are external steps leading to a doorway.	II
Thornton Bridge; 54.23671°N 0.71864°W		Early to mid-18th century	The bridge carrying the A170 road over Thornton Beck is in sandstone and limestone. On the upstream side are two elliptical arches of chamfered voussoirs, separated by a dwarf buttress pier, and a semicircular arch over the diverted millstream. The downstream side has three segmental arches of rusticated voussoirs. Both sides have a parapet with chamfered coping, ending in domed cylindrical piers.	II
Westfield Cottage and outbuilding 54.23052°N 0.72646°W	—	Early to mid-18th century	The house has a cruck framed core, it is encased in sandstone, and has a pantile roof. There is one storey and an attic, two bays, and a single-storey lean-to outbuilding on the left. The central doorway is flanked by horizontally sliding sash windows with grooved wedge lintels, and above are two raking dormers.	II
Ha-ha wall, The Hall; 54.23517°N 0.71744°W	—	1739	The wall to the ha-ha in the grounds to the south of the hall is in limestone. It is a sunken wall about 3 metres (9.8 ft) in height, and 400 metres (1,300 ft) in length, with a semicircular centre section.	II
Bridge over ha-ha, The Hall; 54.23513°N 0.71784°W	—	c. 1739	The bridge crossing the ha-ha in the grounds to the south of the hall is in limestone, and consists of a single segmental arch. It has a plain band, and parapet with flat copings and pilaster strips. The walls are angled outwards, and end in square piers that are rusticated above the band.	II
Ashgill; 54.23740°N 0.71318°W		Mid-18th century	The house is in limestone, and has a pantile roof with a shaped kneeler and gable coping on the left. On the front are a central doorway and a passage doorway to the left, and the windows are horizontally sliding sashes.	II
Bleach Mill Farmhouse; 54.23097°N 0.72253°W		Mid-18th century	The house and attached outbuilding to the right are in sandstone with pantile roofs. The house has two storeys and two bays. There is a central gabled porch, the windows are horizontally sliding sashes, and to the right is a fixed-light fire window. The outbuilding has a single storey, it contains a central doorway, and on the gable end is a pitching window with a pigeoncote above.	II
Brook House; 54.23833°N 0.71656°W		Mid-18th century	The house is in rose and cream brick on a stone plinth, with floor bands, a stepped eaves course, and a pantile roof with coped gables and shaped kneelers. There are two storeys and three bays. On the front are sash windows, with flat gauged brick arches and stone tripartite keystones. The entrance on the right gable end has a cornice porch on piers, and a doorway with a divided fanlight.	II
Gateways; 54.23690°N 0.72178°W		18th century	The house is in sandstone with a pantile roof. There are two storeys and three bays. On the front are a doorway and horizontally sliding sash windows, and all the ground floor openings have heavy plain lintels.	II
High Paper Mill Farmhouse and outbuildings 54.24797°N 0.69377°W	—	Mid-18th century	The paper mill, later a farmhouse, is in sandstone, with a stepped eaves course, and a pantile roof with coped gables and shaped kneelers. There are two low storeys and four bays, and a two-storey one-bay block and a lean-to on the right. The main doorway has a quoined surround and a lintel with a tripartite keystone. To its right is a canted bay window and a sash window on the upper floor. The lower block contains horizontally sliding sash windows, and in the outbuildings are sliding doors and pitching windows.	II
Kim, Hill Cottage and Peartree Cottage; 54.23722°N 0.71315°W		18th century	A row of three cottages in sandstone with a pantile roof. There are two storeys and five bays. On the front are three doorways, and the windows are a mix of casements and horizontally sliding sashes, and there is one fixed-light window.	II
School House; 54.23655°N 0.72051°W		Mid-18th century	The house is in sandstone, with quoins, and a pantile roof with coped gables. There are two storeys and three bays, and an outshut. The central doorway has a fanlight, at the left end is a fire window, and the other windows are horizontally sliding sashes. The ground floor openings have lintels and tripartite keystones.	II
The Buck Inn; 54.23637°N 0.72161°W		18th century	A house and a shop, later part of a public house, in sandstone, with a stepped eaves course, and a pantile roof with coped gables and shaped kneelers. There are two storeys and four bays. On the front is a doorway, the windows are sashes, and on the roof are two gabled dormers with plain bargeboards.	II
Westgate Farmhouse, outbuilding and granary 54.23028°N 0.72641°W	—	18th century	The farmhouse is in limestone with an extension in red brick, a stepped eaves course, and a pantile roof. There are two storeys and two bays. The doorway is in the centre and the windows are sashes. The outbuilding to the right has a cruck framed core, and is enclosed in limestone. All the openings are at the rear, and include a stable door with a heavy lintel and a lifting door. Inside, there are two massive cruck trusses.	II
Elderberry Cottage; 54.23754°N 0.71223°W		Mid to late 18th century	The house is in sandstone with a pantile roof. There are two storeys, three bays, and an outshut. On the front is a doorway, and the windows are horizontally sliding sashes.	II
Well Garth; 54.23771°N 0.71111°W		Mid to late 18th century	The house is in sandstone on a plinth, and has a pantile roof with a coped gable and a shaped kneelers on the right. There are two storeys and four bays. On the front is a doorway, and the left bay contains a fire window on the ground floor and a small casement window above. The other windows are larger casements with lintels and keystones.	II
3 and 5A Whitbygate; 54.23671°N 0.72204°W		Late 18th century	A house, later a shop and an office, in sandstone, with quoins, and a pantile roof with coped gables and shaped kneelers. There are two storeys and three bays. On the front is a doorway flanked by sash windows, and to the left is a shop window. The upper floor contains sash windows, and all the openings have lintels and keystones.	II
6 Chestnut Avenue; 54.23658°N 0.72039°W	—	Late 18th century	The house is in sandstone with a pantile roof. There are two low storeys, two bays and a rear outshut. In the centre is a doorway, and the windows are horizontally sliding sashes. The ground floor openings have heavy painted chiselled lintels, and on the upper floor the lintels are in timber.	II
Brook Farmhouse; 54.23715°N 0.72116°W	—	Late 18th century	The farmhouse is in sandstone, partly rendered, and has a pantile roof with coped gables and shaped kneelers. There are two storeys, a double depth plan, and two bays. The central doorway has a fanlight, there is one casement window on the upper floor, and the other windows are sashes. All the openings have painted flat arches.	II
Brookfield; 54.23243°N 0.72277°W	—	Late 18th century	The cottage is in sandstone, the left gable partly rendered, and it has a pantile roof. There is a single storey and an attic, three bays, and an outshut. On the front is a doorway flanked by sashes, and on the attic is a raking dormer with a horizontally sliding sash window.	II
Keepers Cottage; 54.23565°N 0.72198°W		Late 18th century	The house is in colourwashed sandstone, with quoins, a stepped eaves course, and a pantile roof with coped gables and shaped kneelers. There are two storeys and two bays, a rear wing and an outshut. In the centre is a porch and a doorway, and the windows are horizontally sliding sashes, the ground floor openings with heavy painted tooled lintels.	II
Linton Cottage and Lyland; 54.23715°N 0.71392°W		Late 18th century	A pair of cottages in sandstone on a plinth, with a pantile roof. There are two storeys and two bays. The doorways are paired in the centre, the windows are sashes, and all the openings have heavy chiselled lintels.	II
Millhouse; 54.24011°N 0.71759°W		Late 18th century	The house is in sandstone, with chamfered quoins, a stepped eaves course, and a pantile roof with coped gables and shaped kneelers. There are two storeys, three bays, and a rear extension. On the centre is a cornice porch on piers, and a doorway with a fanlight. The windows are sashes, and all the openings have painted wedge lintels.	II
New Inn Cottages; 54.23626°N 0.72260°W		Late 18th century	A row of three cottages in sandstone, with quoins, and a pantile roof with coped gables. There are two storeys and three bays. On the front are three doorways, the left two paired, and the windows are sashes.	II
Newholme and Rolyat; 54.23771°N 0.71226°W		Late 18th century	A pair of cottages in sandstone with a pantile roof. There are two storeys and two bays. The two doorways are paired in the centre, and the windows are horizontally sliding sashes.	II
Rockingham House; 54.23709°N 0.72204°W		Late 18th century	The house is in sandstone, the left gable wall rendered, with raised chamfered quoins, a moulded eaves course, and a pantile roof with coped gables and shaped kneelers. There are two storeys, three bays, and a rear extension. The doorway is in the centre, the windows are sashes, and all the openings have lintels with triple keystones.	II
Rorty Crankle; 54.23391°N 0.72245°W		Late 18th century	The house is in sandstone, with a moulded eaves cornice, and a pantile roof with coped gables and shaped kneelers. There are two storeys and attics, three bays, and a rear wing on the left. On the front is a doorway, the windows are sashes, and on the attics are three flat-roofed dormers.	II
Rose Cottage, Westgate; 54.23063°N 0.72718°W	—	Late 18th century	The house is in sandstone with a pantile roof. There are two storeys and two bays, and a rear extension. The doorway in the right bay has a timber latticed porch, and the windows are sashes.	II
Rose Tree Cottage; 54.23401°N 0.72243°W		Late 18th century	The house is in sandstone with a pantile roof. There are two storeys and two bays. The doorway is in the left bay, and the windows are sashes.	II
Roxby Farm Cottage; 54.23441°N 0.72237°W		Late 18th century	The house is in sandstone with a pantile roof. There are two storeys and two bays. The doorway is in the right bay, and the windows are sashes. The ground floor openings have heavy painted lintels.	II
Stone Cottage; 54.23060°N 0.72711°W		Late 18th century	The cottage is in sandstone with a pantile roof. There are two low storeys, one bay, a rear extension and an outshut. The doorway is on the right, and the windows are horizontally sliding sashes.	II
Summertree Farmhouse; 54.20585°N 0.73341°W	—	Late 18th century	The farmhouse is in pink and cream brick, and has a pantile roof with coped gables and shaped kneelers. There are two storeys, three bays, and an outshut. The doorway is in the centre, and the windows are horizontally sliding sashes. The ground floor openings have cambered brick arches.	II
The Dales; 54.23506°N 0.72237°W		Late 18th century	The house is in sandstone, with chamfered quoins on the left, a moulded eaves course, and a pantile roof. There are two storeys and two bays. The doorway on the right bay has a fanlight, and the windows are sashes. All the openings have painted heavy lintels.	II
The Grange; 54.23774°N 0.71089°W		Late 18th century	The house is in sandstone, and has a pantile roof with coped gables and shaped kneelers. There are two storeys and an attic, and four bays. The doorway in the second bay has a divided fanlight, the windows are sashes, all the openings have wedge lintels, and on the attic are four gabled dormers.	II
Gate piers and walls, The Hall; 54.23662°N 0.71841°W		Late 18th century	The gate piers flanking the entrance to the kitchen yard are in sandstone, and are about 5 metres (16 ft) in height. They have stepped plinths and flat top, and a ball and pedestal finial has survived on the left pier. The piers are flanked by walls with flat coping and pilasters. The wall to the left is ramped up and ends in a square pier with a pyramidal cap. The wall to the right is longer and is carried across a beck on two arches of voussoirs.	II
The New Inn; 54.23623°N 0.72224°W		Late 18th century	The public house is in limestone, with chamfered quoins, and a slate roof with coped gables and shaped kneelers. There are two storeys and four bays, a rear wing and an outshut. The doorway is in the second bay, to its left is a canted bay window with a moulded cornice, and the other windows are sashes. All the openings have painted flat arches and keystones.	II
The Old Vicarage; 54.23511°N 0.72236°W		Late 18th century	The house is in sandstone, with chamfered quoins, a moulded eaves course, and a pantile roof. There are two storeys, three bays, and a rear wing. The central doorway has fluted borders and a divided fanlight, the windows are sashes, and all the openings have lintels and keystones.	II
The Owlets; 54.23707°N 0.71351°W		Late 18th century	A house and a shop, later a house, it is in sandstone, with a stepped eaves course, and a pantile roof. There are two storeys and two bays. On the left is a shopfront with pilasters, a bracketed entablature and a cornice, and to the right is a doorway with a plain surround. Further to the right, and on the upper floor, are horizontally sliding sash windows. The ground floor openings have grooved lintels.	II
Wall north of The Riding Stables; 54.23672°N 0.71749°W		Late 18th century	The wall is in sandstone, it is coped, and about 0.75 metres (2 ft 6 in) in height, ramped up twice to about 4 metres (13 ft). It contains a doorway with pilaster piers, and a lintel with a keystone. At the entrance to the yard is a square pier with a pyramidal cap.	II
Whitbygate House; 54.23767°N 0.72208°W		Late 18th century	The house is in sandstone with chiselled chamfered quoins, an eaves cornice, and a pantile roof with coped gables and shaped kneelers. There are two storeys, three bays, and a rear extension. The central doorway has a divided fanlight, the windows are sashes, and all the openings have lintels with grooved triple keystones.	II
California Farmhouse; 54.22045°N 0.75120°W	—	Late 18th to early 19th century	The farmhouse is in limestone, with quoins, a moulded eaves course, and a pantile roof with coped gables and shaped kneelers. There are two storeys at the front, one storey and an attic with a catslide roof at the rear, three bays, and an outshut. The central doorway has a divided fanlight, the windows are sashes, and all the openings have lintels with tripartite keystones.	II
Rose Cottage, High Street; 54.23808°N 0.71028°W		Late 18th to early 19th century	The house is in sandstone with a pantile roof. There are two storeys and two bays. In the centre is a projecting gabled timber porch and a doorway with a blocked fanlight. The windows are sashes with grooved lintels.	II
Hall Farmhouse; 54.23446°N 0.72155°W	—	Early 19th century	The farmhouse is in whitewashed sandstone, and has a pantile roof with coped gables and shaped kneelers. There are two storeys, a double depth plan and a front of three bays. The central doorway has a divided fanlight, the windows are sashes, and all the openings have lintels with incised keystones.	II
Ivy House and outbuilding 54.23768°N 0.71131°W		Early 19th century	The house is in sandstone on a plinth, with a slate roof. There are two storeys, three bays, and a single-storey two-bay outbuilding to the right. The central doorway has a fanlight, and the windows are sashes. On the outbuilding is a doorway and a fixed-light window.	II
Manor Farmhouse; 54.23740°N 0.71810°W		Early 19th century	The farmhouse is in sandstone, with a stepped eaves course, and a pantile roof with coped gables and shaped kneelers. There are two storeys, three bays, and a rear outshut with a catslide roof. In the centre is a weatherboarded porch, and a doorway with a fanlight. The windows are tripartite sashes with painted grooved lintels and incised keystones.	II
Rookwood; 54.23210°N 0.72232°W		Early 19th century	The house is in pink and cream brick with a pantile roof. There are two storeys and three bays. In the centre is a gabled latticed porch and a doorway with a divided fanlight, and the windows are sashes. All the openings have heavy painted and chiselled lintels.	II
Roxby Cottage; 54.23468°N 0.72238°W		Early 19th century	The house is in sandstone on a plinth, with a moulded eaves course, a timber eaves cornice and a pantile roof. There are two storeys and two bays. The doorway in the right bay has a fanlight, above it is a blocked window, and the other windows are sashes. All the openings have wedge lintels and triple keystones.	II
Roxby House; 54.23477°N 0.72239°W		Early 19th century	The house is in sandstone on a plinth, with raised quoins, a moulded eaves course, a timber eaves cornice, and a pantile roof with a coped gable and a shaped kneeler on the right. There are two storeys and three bays. The central doorway has a fanlight, the windows are sashes, and all the openings have wedge lintels and triple keystones.	II
Former Gift Box and Welcome Café; 54.23637°N 0.72137°W	—	Early 19th century	Two houses, later used for other purposes, in limestone, with quoins, a moulded eaves course, and a pantile roof. Both parts have sash windows on the upper floor with grooved lintels and triple keystones, and the left part has three gabled dormers. The left part has two storeys and an attic, and three bays. On the ground floor is a doorway and shop window on the left, and a shopfront to the right. The right part has two storeys and three bays. The ground floor has two shopfronts, between which is a doorway with an entablature, fluted pilasters with rosettes, and a cornice.	II
Wardill Brothers; 54.23608°N 0.72217°W		Early 19th century	To houses, later shops, in sandstone, with grooved quoins, and apantile roofs with coped gables and shaped kneelers. Both parts have modern shopfronts on the ground floor. The left part has two storeys and two bays, a moulded eaves course, and sash windows with keystones. The right part is slightly lower, with two storeys and an attic, three narrower bays, and a stepped eaves course. The middle openings are blocked, and the others contain sash windows.	II
Beck Hall; 54.23771°N 0.71653°W		1830	The house is in sandstone, with a stepped eaves course, and a pantile roof with coped gables and shaped kneelers. There are two storeys and four bays, and a later lower extension of two storeys and four bays on the left. The doorway in the second bay has fluted pilasters, a divided fanlight, a moulded frieze and a modillion cornice. The third bay contains a wide full-height bow window, and the other ground floor windows are replacement French windows. The upper floor contains sash windows, and above the bow window is a small flat-roofed dormer.	II
Comber House; 54.23671°N 0.71555°W		1839	A rectory, later divided into two private houses, it is in sandstone on a plinth, with paired eaves modillions, and a hipped slate roof. There are two storeys and two blocks, each with three bays, the right block lower. The left block contains a central doorway with an architrave and a cornice, and the central doorway on the right block has a plain architrave. The windows on both blocks are sashes with flat arches of voussoirs. At the rear of the left block is a full-height canted bay window.	II
Wall, gate and railings, Brook House; 54.23832°N 0.71673°W		Undated	Enclosing the garden at the front of the house is a red brick wall with cambered sandstone coping. On the wall are cast iron railings with spiral tips and urn finials, and in the centre is a gate.	II
