= All Saints' Church, Thornton-le-Dale =

Church in Thornton-le-Dale, North Yorkshire, England

Coordinates: 54.2370°N 0.7155°W

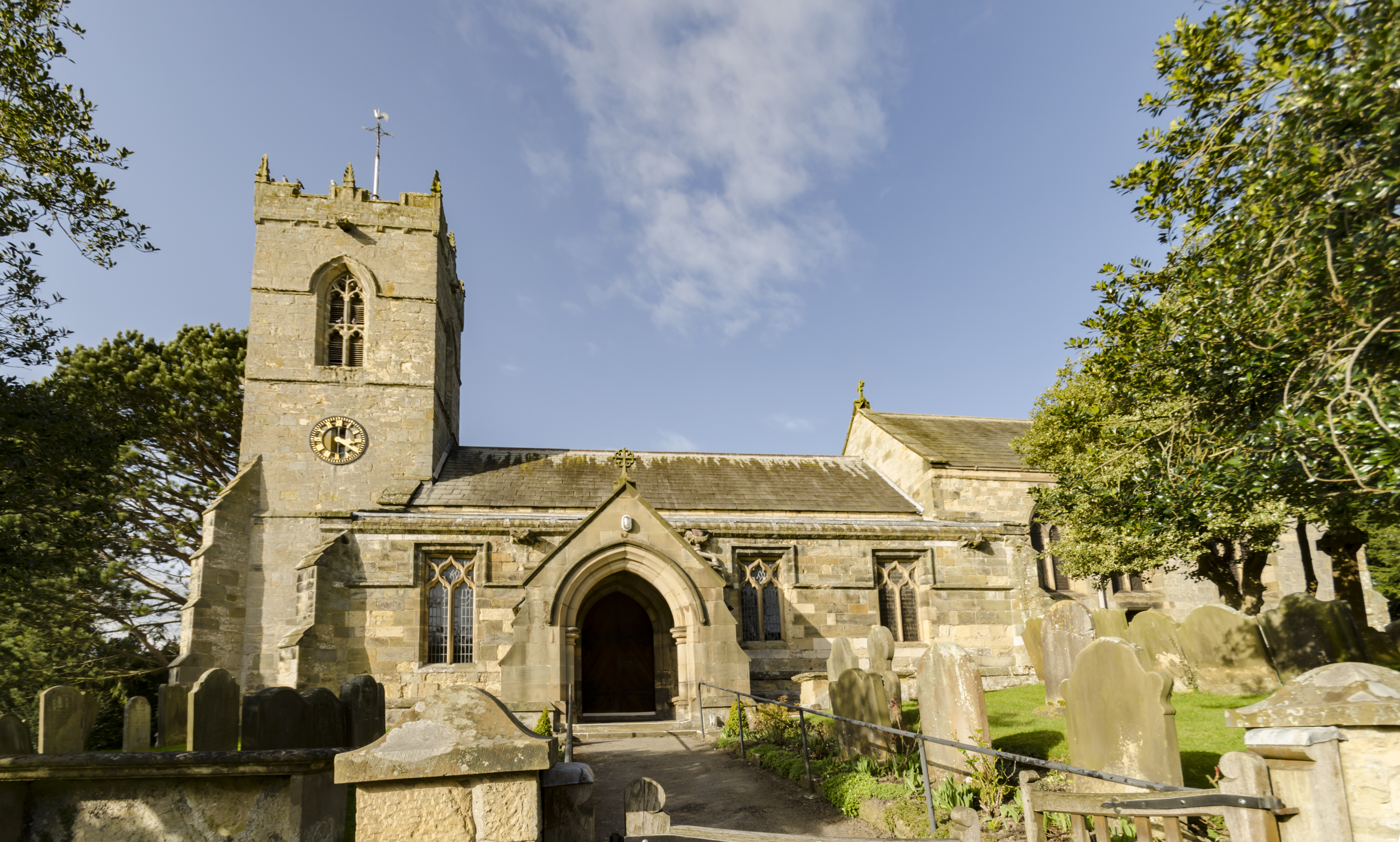
The church, in 2017

All Saints' Church is the parish church of Thornton-le-Dale, a village in North Yorkshire, in England.

The church was rebuilt in the early 14th century, from which period the nave and part of the chancel survive. A tower was added late in the century. Between 1865 and 1866, the chancel and vestry were rebuilt, the nave was restored and all the windows were replaced, the work being by Edward Wyndham Tarn. A porch was added in 1900. The building was grade II* listed in 1953.

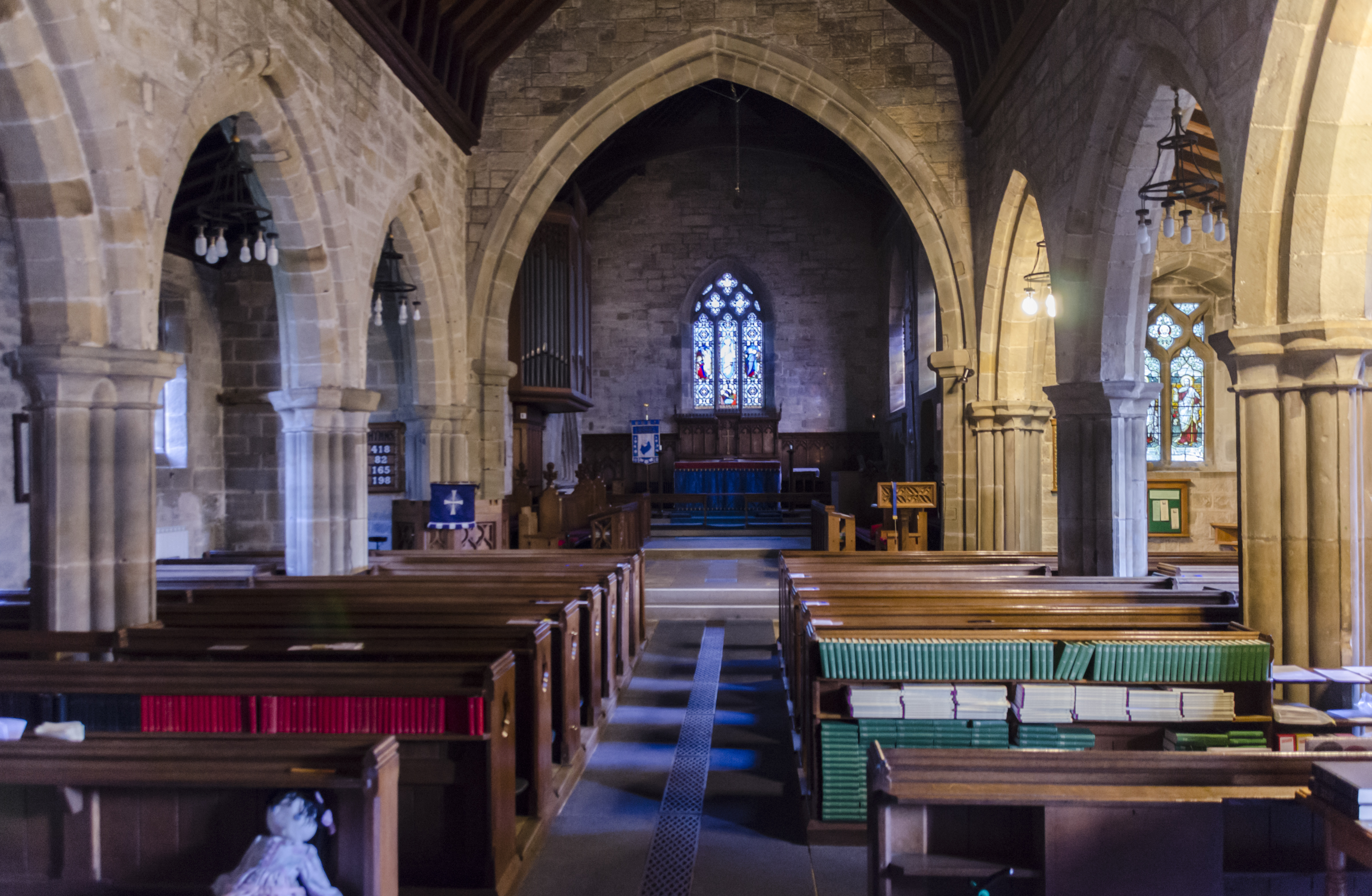
View from the nave into the chancel

The church is built of sandstone with a stone flagged roof, and consists of a nave, north and south aisles, a south porch, a chancel and vestry, and a west tower. The tower has four stages, diagonal buttresses, string courses, and a west window with a pointed arch, three lights and a hood mould. On the second stage are clock faces, the bell openings have two lights, and above is an embattled parapet with crocketed pinnacles. Inside, there are a 14th-century piscina and sedilia. There are several 17th- and 18th-century memorials, and a canopied tomb with a figure of a woman with a dog at her feet, the woman possibly being Beatrice Hastings, who died around 1320.

== See also ==
- Grade II* listed buildings in North Yorkshire (district)
- Listed buildings in Thornton-le-Dale
