= Church of St Hilda, Ellerburn =

Anglican church in North Yorkshire, England

Church of St Hilda
- St Hilda's Church
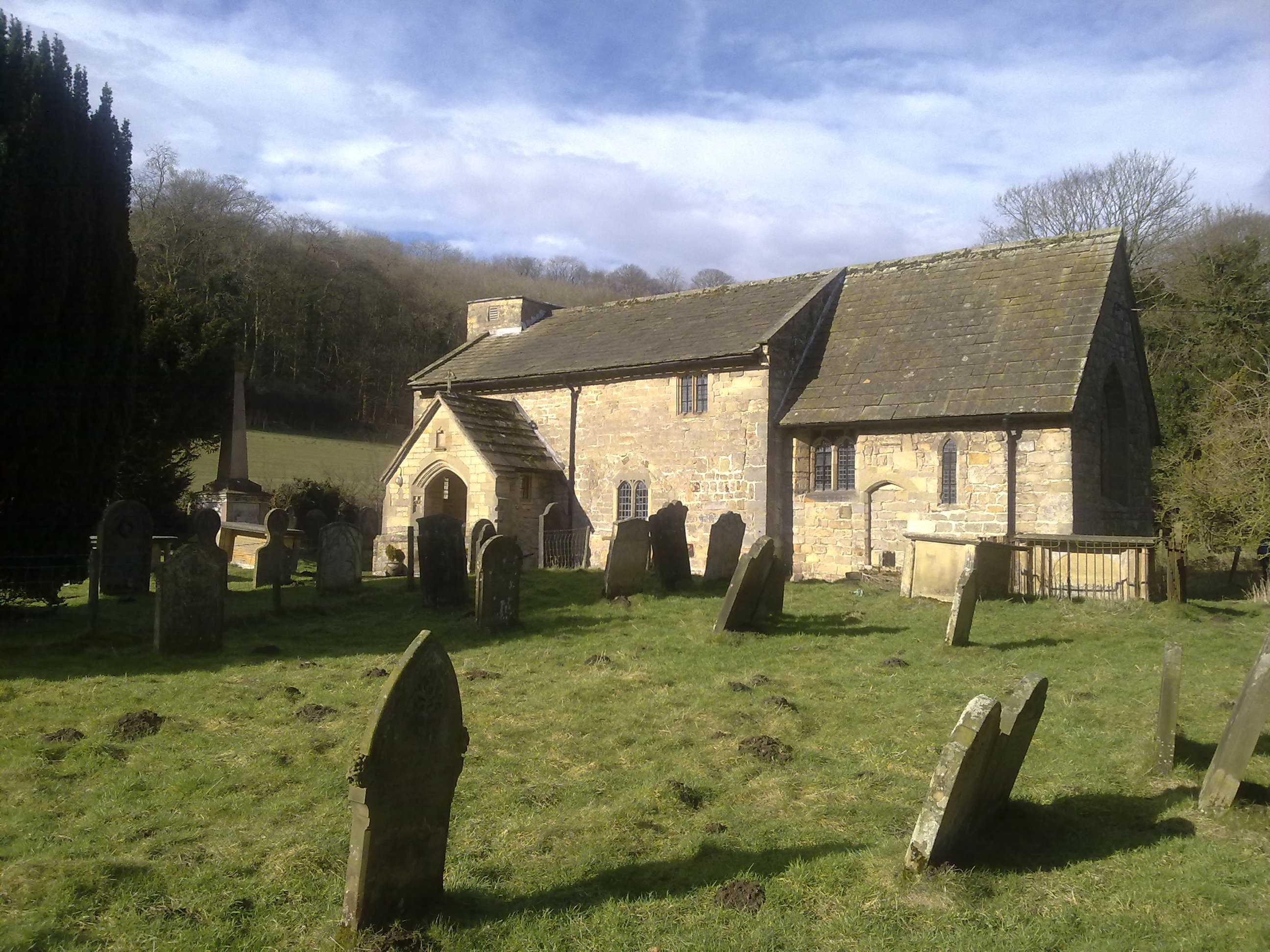

- Location within North Yorkshire
- 54.246°N 0.710°W
- OS grid reference: SE 84142 84218
- Location: Ellerburn, North Yorkshire
- Country: England
- Denomination: Church of England

Administration
- Diocese: Diocese of York
- Archdeaconry: Cleveland
- Deanery: Northern Ryedale
- Benefice: Moor and Dale
- Parish: Thornton Dale with Ellerburn and Wilton

Listed Building – Grade II*
- Designated: 5 February 1986
- Reference no.: 1074194

The Church of St Hilda, Ellerburn, is an Anglican church in North Yorkshire, England. The church is located in the hamlet of Ellerburn, to the north of Thornton-le-Dale, and is an ancient structure that dates back to Saxon times and has been renovated twice, extensively in 1904. It was briefly famous in 2004 and 2011 for having to be being closed due to bats nesting in the roof.

== History ==
The church is just to the north of Thornton-le-Dale, 2 miles (3.2 km) east of Pickering, and sits in a small valley with Kirkdale to the north, and Thornton Beck flowing just to the south of the church grounds. The foundations of the church are thought to be early Saxon, and even though the above ground structure dates to the 11th century, pieces and relics from the Saxon period have been set into its walls, and point to an earlier period possibly as late as the 10th century. One of the pieces in the wall depicts a dragon with its eyes looking backwards, whilst a part of a stone cross has been built into the porch. The church serves the villages of Wilton and Farmanby, Ellerburn itself only consisted of the church building, a farm and a few cottages. The reason for building the church on the site is not obvious, as parishioners would have had to travel in from other surrounding villages, although an 1835 listing describes the population as being 192.

The church was extensively restored in the 15th century, and again between 1904 and 1905, and is now a grade II* listed building, with a new lychgate being installed in 1909. During the works of 1904/1905, the architect overseeing the renovations theorised that the chancel arch once had a fresco of the "Last Judgement" upon it at some time. Also discovered during the renovations was a large stone that predated the Reformation (possibly even as far back as the ninth century), which the vicar set upon some trestles to use as a Communion table. It was later determined by a manorial court that stones used in the rebuilding of the church in 1905, had been taken from a nearby quarry without permission, with the blame falling upon the incumbent vicar.

The graveyard surrounding the church has been used for burials since at least the 8th century. A proposal to extend the graveyard northwards into the adjacent field has been met with objections due to its proximity to a local aquifer. One of the monuments in the graveyard is a large, red granite edifice with a stone finial, which Jeffery describes as a "...hideous obelisk, erected in the worst of taste..." It is dedicated to three members of the Dobson family who were from Ellerburn.

The church made headlines in 2004, and in 2011, due to colonies of bats who were roosting in the roof space. One particular species, was flying into the church interior and soiling the inside of the church with urine and faeces, but measures to control the bats were not allowed as they are protected by law. Services had stopped being held in the church, the first time its believed, since the Civil War. The roof of the church was later sealed from the interior, allowing parishioners to worship again, but which also allowed the bats to access the roof.

Between 1829 and 1830, the vicar at St Hilda's was Sir William Cockburn, 11th Baronet, who was also Dean of York at the time.

== Parish and benefice ==
The church is part of the ecclesiastical parish of Thornton Dale with Ellerburn and Wilton, in the benefice of Moor and Dale, part of the Deanery of Northern Ryedale in the Diocese of York. The Ecclesiastical Parish of Thornton with Ellerburn and Wilton was created by an Anglican Commission which sat in 1930. Historically, the parish was often associated with, and administered, by the parish of Pickering, with the vicar holding a plurality. The first named priest was Adam de Insula, who was also named as the vicar of nearby Thornton-le-Dale. Ellerburn itself was an ecclesiastical parish in a peculiar of the Deanery of York established in the 14th century. The Deans of York Minster continued to exercise control over the peculiar until 1844, when the peculiar was vested with the Ecclesiastical Commissioners.

== See also ==
- Grade II* listed buildings in North Yorkshire (district)
- Listed buildings in Thornton-le-Dale
