= St George's Church, Wilton =

Church in North Yorkshire, England

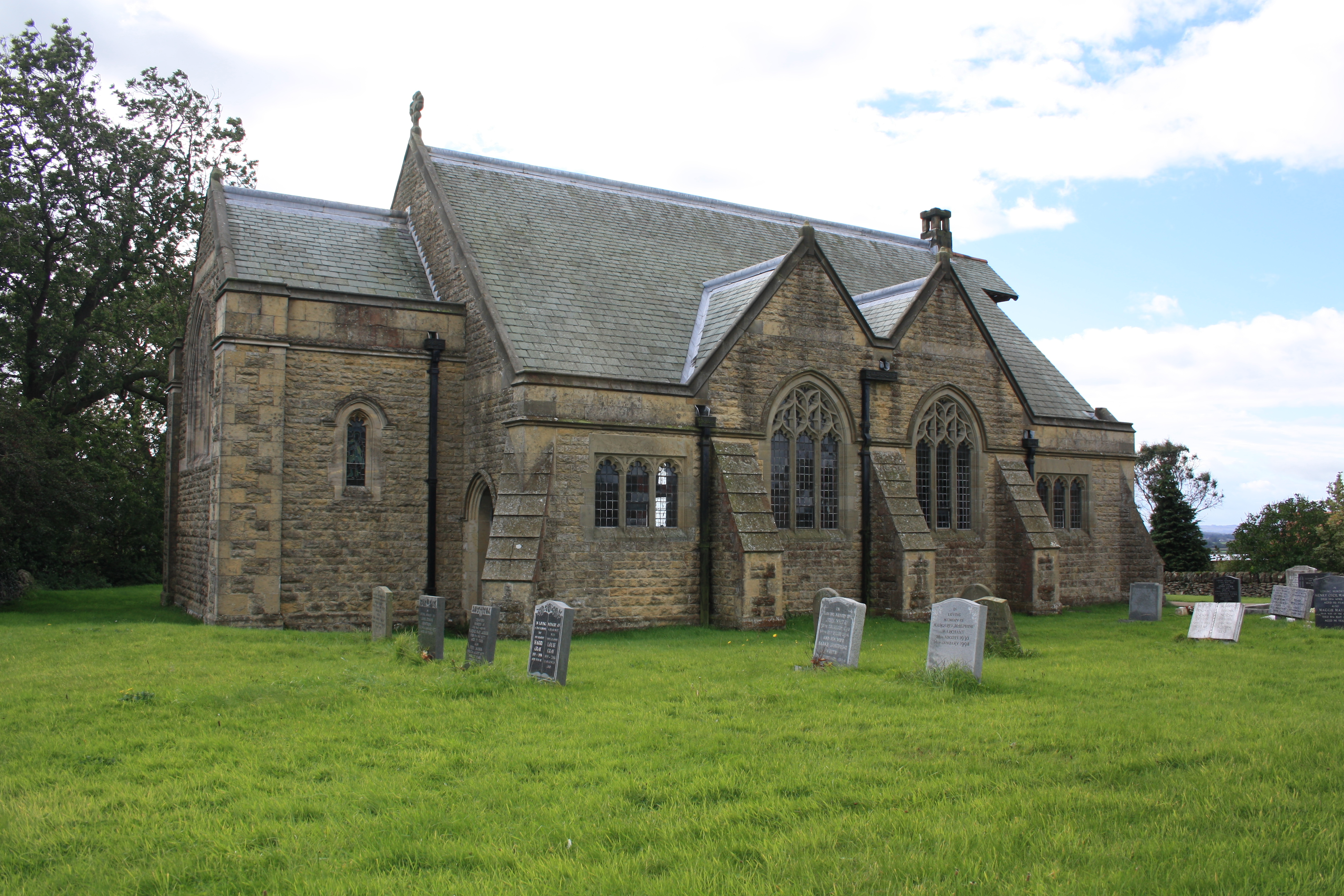
The church, in 2010

St George's Church is the parish church of Wilton, a village near Pickering, North Yorkshire, in England.

A church was built in Wilton in the 13th century, but it appears to have been largely rebuilt in the 17th century, with only the south arcade surviving from the original building. It was demolished and a new church built by Charles Hodgson Fowler between 1907 and 1922, the work incorporating the south arcade. A tower was planned but never constructed. The building was grade II listed in 2011.

The church is built of stone with dressings in sandstone and limestone, and has a Westmorland slate roof. The church consists of a nave, north and south aisles, and a chancel; each aisle has two gabled bays. The west end is built of brick, and has tower footings and a half-timbered porch, both with slate roofs, and above is a projecting wooden bell turret. Inside, there is a Norman tub font, 13th- and 14th-century bells, and panelling made of 17th-century pew ends.

== See also ==
- Listed buildings in Wilton, Ryedale
