= Troutsdale =

Valley in North Yorkshire, England

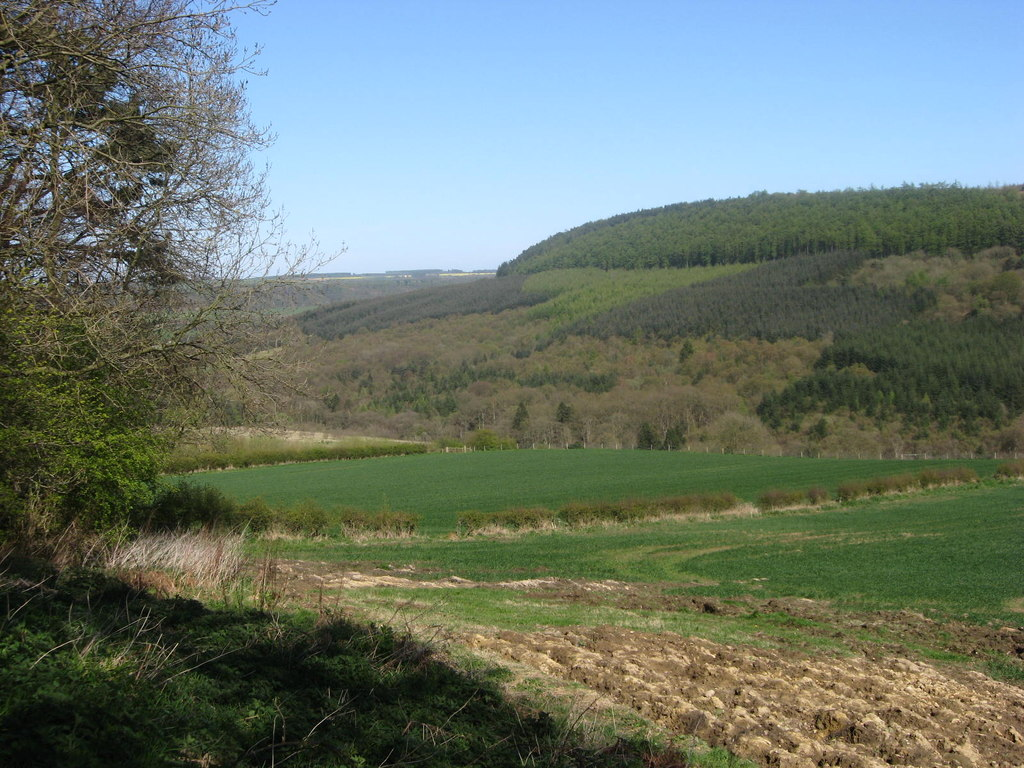
- Floor elevation: 96 m (315 ft)

Geography
- Location: North Yorkshire
- Country: England
- Coordinates: 54°17′0″N 0°35′7″W
- River: Troutsdale Beck
- Interactive map of Troutsdale

Troutsdale is a narrow valley that lies on the south-eastern edge of the North York Moors National Park, in North Yorkshire, England. The water flowing through the valley, Troutsdale beck, feeds eastwards into the River Derwent at West Croft. The valley is 9 miles (14 km) west of Scarborough, and 10 miles (16 km) north east of Pickering.

== History ==
Troutsdale is mentioned in the Domesday Book as being part owned by Arnetkil and in the wapentake of Dic (later known as Pickering Lythe); by 1086, it was owned by King William. The name was recorded in the Domesday Book as Truzstal meaning Trut's valley or Trouts Pool. The first named reference to the stream in the valley comes in 1355 as Troucedalebek. A corn mill situated on Troutsdale Beck was first mentioned in 1621. The current mill building was built in the early 19th century, being last used for corn-milling in 1938/1939, and is now grade II listed private dwelling.

The valley has a mixture of geology; the escarpment along Troutsdale which takes the valley towards the River Derwent is composed of mudstone, Osgodby sandstone and cornbrash. The stone quarried on Troutsdale Moor was known to be of "excellent quality". Troutsdale Beck flows for 8.4 kilometres (5.2 mi) and drains an area of 13.3 square kilometres (5.1 sq mi). It flows southwards then turns eastwards, before running mostly in a north-easterly direction and entering the River Derwent at West Croft. The valley lies at the south-eastern edge of the North York Moors and along with similar dales nearby (Deep Dale, Stain Dale and Thornton Dale), it has a deep-stream valley. This area of the North York Moors has seventeen narrow valleys spanning a distance of only 8 miles (13 km) between them all; the distance between the head of Troutsdale and that of Givendale (which leads directly south), is only 0.5 miles (0.80 km), demonstrating the compact size of the valleys. The road through Troutsdale connects Hackness in the north, with Snainton in the south, which is on the main Scarborough to Pickering road (A170 road). Due to its twists, turns and up-and-down nature, the road used to be known locally as "the Little Switzerland of the north."

The western edge of Troutsdale Beck and a feeder stream into Rosekirk Dale, are designated as an SSSI (Troutsdale and Rosekirk Dale Fens). The SSSI is noted as being a rare Corallian limestone fen which only occurs in three other regions besides North Yorkshire (Anglesey, Norfolk and Oxfordshire), and for being home to limonia occidua, a type of cranefly which is commonly found in Scotland, but very few places in England.

The valley was used for warrening (rabbit farming) well into the 19th century. Maps show a 400-acre (160 ha) area dedicated to raising rabbits.

The surname Troutsdale (and derivatives of that; Trowsdale, Truesdale, Trowsdall) all stem from the names of occupants of the valley.

== Population and administrative history ==
Historically, the area was in the wapentake of Pickering Lythe, Troutsdale was historically a township in the ancient parish of Brompton, in 1866, the legal definition of 'parish' was changed to be the areas used for administering the poor laws, and so Troutsdale became a civil parish. In 1974 it was moved from the old North Riding of Yorkshire into North Yorkshire. On 1 April 1985 the parish was abolished to form Broxa cum Troutsdale and Darncombe cum Langdale End, part also went to Snainton. At the 1971 census (one of the last before the abolition of the parish), Troutsdale had a population of 27. The valley now straddles various civil parishes; Brompton, Broxa-cum-Troutsdale, Darncombe-cum-Langdale End, Ebberston and Yedingham, Snainton and Wykeham.

Population of Troutsdale 1801–1971
1801	1811	1821	1831	1841	1851	1861	1871	1881	1891	1901	1911	1921	1931	1951	1961	1971
53	60	45	59	96	69	67	62	60	67	55	50	50	47	42	33	27
