= Habton =

Civil parish in North Yorkshire, England

Coordinates: 54°10′33.600″N 0°50′13.200″W

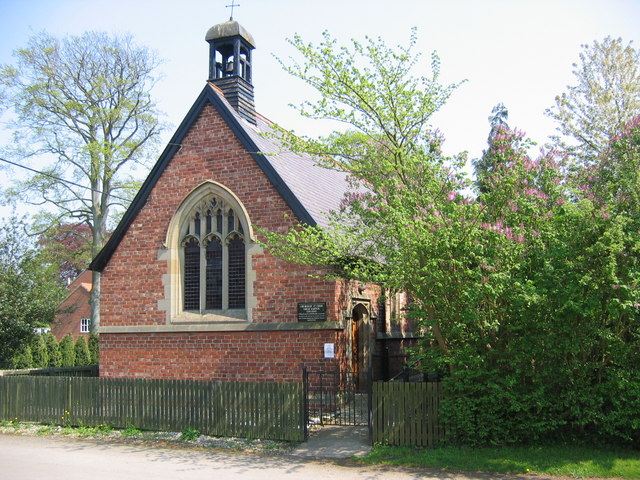

- Location within North Yorkshire
- Population: 321 (2011 census)
- Unitary authority: North Yorkshire
- Ceremonial county: North Yorkshire
- Region: Yorkshire and the Humber
- Country: England
- Sovereign state: United Kingdom
- Police: North Yorkshire
- Fire: North Yorkshire
- Ambulance: Yorkshire

Habton is a civil parish in North Yorkshire, England. In 2011, it had a population of 321.

It was part of the Ryedale district between 1974 and 2023. It is now administered by North Yorkshire Council.

== History ==
The name "Habton" means 'Hab(b)a's farm/settlement'. Both Great and Little Habton was recorded in the Domesday Book as Abbetune/Abetune/Habetun. Both Habtons and Ryton were formerly townships in the parish of Kirby Misperton, from 1866, the three hamlets were civil parishes in their own right, on 1 April 1986 the parishes of Great Habton, Little Habton and Ryton were abolished and merged to form Habton.

== See also ==
- Listed buildings in Habton
