= Beck Isle Cottage =

Building in Thornton-le-Dale, North Yorkshire, England

Coordinates: 54°14′14″N 0°43′07″W

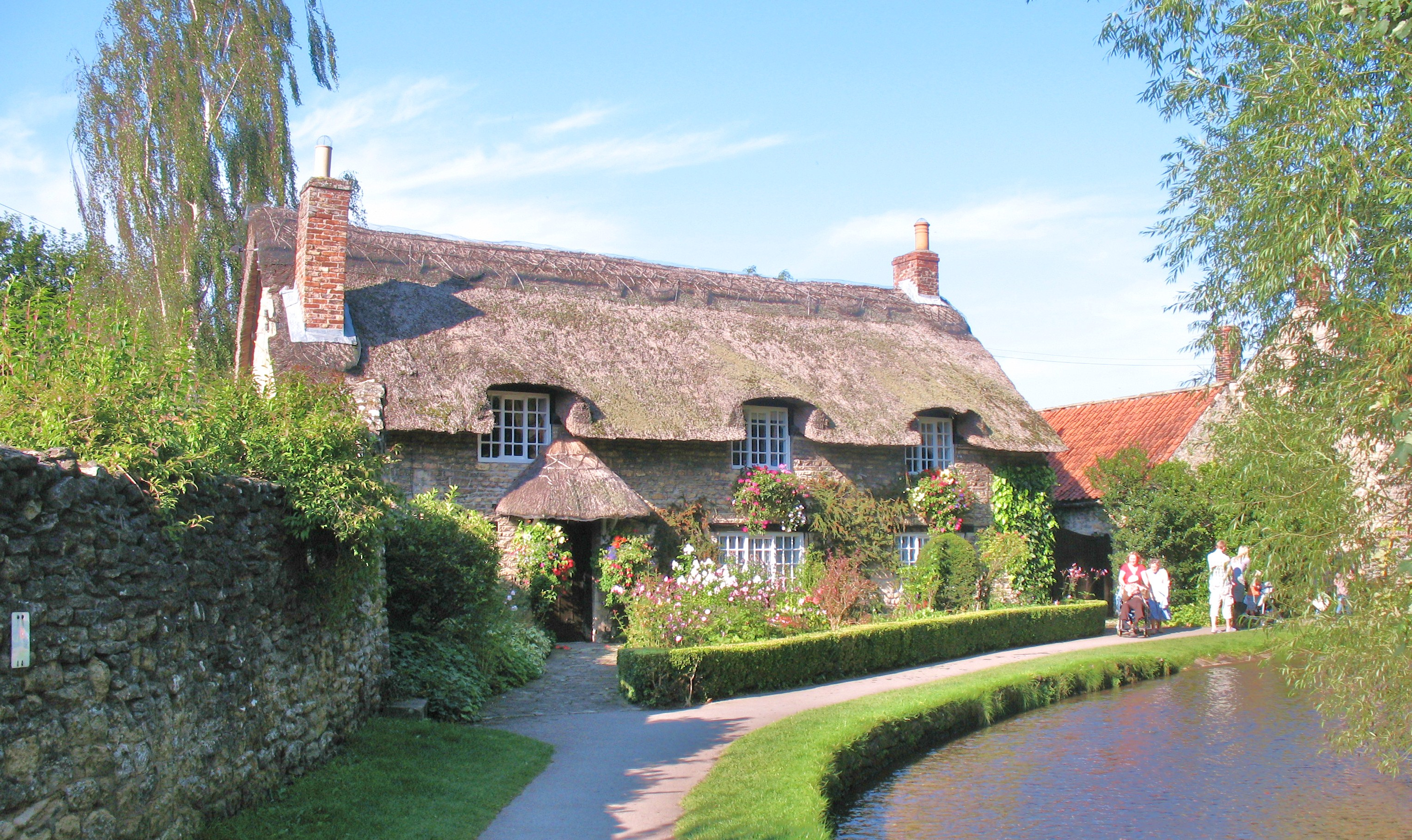
The building, in 2012

Beck Isle Cottage is a historic building in Thornton-le-Dale, a village in North Yorkshire, in England.

The cottage was built in the 17th century, and in the 20th century was heightened, extended and restored. It is the last remaining thatched cottage in the village, and was most recently rethatched in 2015. It has been described as having a "fairytale feel" and as being "potentially the most photographed home in Yorkshire". The house has four bedrooms, three reception rooms and two bathrooms. The building was grade II listed in 1986.

The house has a cruck framed core, it is encased in sandstone, and has a stepped eaves course and a thatched roof. There is one storey and an attic, three bays, and a later rear wing. On the left bay is a projecting bracketed thatched porch, and the windows are horizontally sliding sashes, those in the attic in eyebrow dormers. Inside, three pairs of jointed crucks have survived.

== See also ==
- Listed buildings in Thornton-le-Dale
