= Lady Lumley's School =

Community school in Pickering, North Yorkshire, England

Location
- Swainsea Lane; Pickering, North Yorkshire, YO18 8NG; England; 54.2516°N 0.7839°W

Information
- Type: Academy
- Motto: Deo, Regi, Patriae (For God, King, Country)
- Founder: Lady Lumley
- Local authority: North Yorkshire
- Trust: Delta Academies Trust
- Department for Education URN: 148602 Tables
- Ofsted: Reports
- Head teacher: Clair Foden
- Gender: Coeducational
- Age: 11 to 18
- Enrolment: 1,253 pupils
- Website: https://www.ladylumleys.coastandvale.academy/

Lady Lumley's School is a coeducational secondary school and sixth form located in Pickering, North Yorkshire, England. It was founded in Thornton-le-Dale in 1670.

In 2019, the Ofsted Inspection Report rated Lady Lumley's school as ’Inadequate'. In 2024, Lady Lumley's Academy was rated 'Good' in all categories.

== School history ==
It was endowed by deed of Frances, Viscountess Lumley, an ancestor of the Earl of Scarborough, in 1657, and the original buildings completed in about 1680.

The current co-educational school was originally two single-sex grammar schools, one in Thornton-le-Dale and one on Middleton Road in Pickering, both called Lady Lumley's Grammar School. They were amalgamated in 1904/05, on the Pickering site. In 1864, the school at Thornton had 26 pupils, all boys.

During the Second World War, pupils from Middlesbrough High School for Girls were evacuated to Pickering, and shared the school with the Lady Lumley's pupils.

In the 1940s, pupils carried out an archaeological excavation of the nearby mediaeval hospital of St Nicholas.

In the first half of the twentieth century, the then headmaster of the school, F Austin Hyde, was an expert on the dialect of the area.

Previously a community school administered by North Yorkshire County Council, in May 2021 Lady Lumley's School converted to academy status. It is now sponsored by the Coast and Vale Learning Trust.

In 2025, the Coast and Vale Learning Trust merged into the Delta Academies Trust.

== Notable former pupils ==
- Richard Buck, athlete
- Duncan Dowson, Professor of Mechanical Engineering
- John Healey, Labour Party MP for Wentworth and Dearne (1997–present)
- Craig and Chris Short, footballers
