= Listed buildings in Habton =

Habton is a civil parish in the county of North Yorkshire, England. It contains eight listed buildings that are recorded in the National Heritage List for England. All the listed buildings are designated at Grade II, the lowest of the three grades, which is applied to "buildings of national importance and special interest". The parish contains the settlements of Great Habton, Little Habton and Ryton, and the surrounding countryside. The listed buildings consist of houses, cottages, farmhouses and associated structures, and a bridge.

== Buildings ==
Name and location	Photograph	Date	Notes
Wynn Farmhouse; 54.17644°N 0.83925°W	—	Late 17th to early 18th century	The house, later incorporating a smithy, is in stone, the right gable wall is in variegated brick, and it has a pantile roof. There are two storeys and two bays, a lower bay to the left, the former smithy to the right, and a rear outshut. Most of the windows are casements, and there is a horizontally-sliding sash window.
Manor Farmhouse, Little Habton; 54.18562°N 0.86053°W	—	Early 18th century	Most of the farmhouse dates from the late eighteenth century, the new building incorporating the remains of the earlier building. It is in limestone with chamfered quoins, a floor band, a moulded eaves cornice, and a pantile roof with coped gables and plain kneelers. There are two storeys, a main front of three bays, and a lower wing on the left with two storeys and two bays. The doorway has a radial-glazed fanlight and the windows are sashes, some with keystones. At the rear is a radial-glazed staircase window.
Newsham Bridge; 54.17514°N 0.85560°W		Early 18th century	The bridge carries Newsham Lane over the River Rye. It is in sandstone and consists of three semicircular arches, the middle one taller, and a fourth lower arch. The arches have voussoirs with hood moulds, a raised band, and a raked parapet with chamfered coping. The cutwaters rise to form embrasures in the parapet.
Garden wall, Garforth Hall; 54.16720°N 0.81721°W	—	Mid 18th century or earlier	The wall on the west side of the garden has a quadrant plan, and is about 100 metres (330 ft) long and 5 metres (16 ft) high. It is in red brick with stone coping on the garden side, and in limestone with pantile coping on the outer side. On the garden side is a segmental arch with gates, and to its left is a round-arched niche. The outer side has four semicircular buttresses, and a gateway with a brick arch, a stone keystone and quoins.
Habton House Farmhouse and cottage 54.18533°N 0.86212°W	—	18th century or earlier	The cottage is in red brick with lower courses of stone, the house is in sandstone, and both have pantile roofs. There are two storeys, the cottage is on the right, to the left is the house that has an L-shaped plan with a front range of five bays and a projecting central wing, and further to the left is a cart shed. Most of the windows are sashes, and some have wedge lintels.
Manor Farmhouse, Great Habton; 54.17733°N 0.83744°W	—	18th century	Most of the building dates from about 1800 when a new house was built incorporating the older house. It is in brick with some stone, and has a slate roof with shaped kneelers and coped gables. Three are three storeys and three bays, and a two-storey single-bay extension to the right. On the front is a porch with a cornice, and steps leading to a doorway with a divided fanlight. The windows are sashes with stone sills and painted wedge lintels.
Garforth Hall; 54.16720°N 0.81685°W	—	Mid to late 18th century	The farmhouse, which was later extended, is in orange -red brick, rendered on the front, with floor and eaves bands, a slate roof on the front, and a pantile roof at the rear, with coped gables and moulded kneelers. There are two storeys, a front range of three bays, and a later rear wing. On the front is a doorway with a fanlight and to its left is a square bay window, both under a porch roof. Most of the other windows are sashes.
Ryton Grange; 54.16969°N 0.82256°W	—	1799	A house in red brick with a floor band, and a pantile roof with coped gables and shaped kneelers. There are two storeys and three bays. The central round-arched doorway has a fanlight, and the windows are sashes with stone sills and wedge lintels. In the left gable wall, tie rods spell out the date and initials.
