= Ryton, North Yorkshire =

Hamlet in North Yorkshire, England

Coordinates: 54.170409°N 0.78455320°W

Ryton
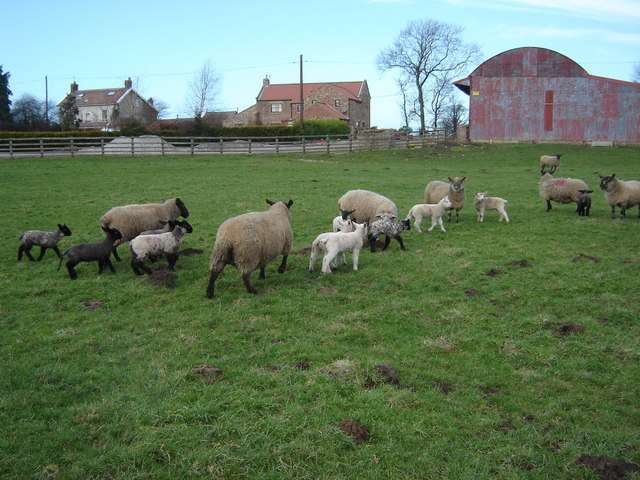
- Farm just North of Ryton Bridge

- Location within North Yorkshire
- Civil parish: Habton
- Unitary authority: North Yorkshire
- Ceremonial county: North Yorkshire
- Region: Yorkshire and the Humber
- Country: England
- Sovereign state: United Kingdom
- Police: North Yorkshire
- Fire: North Yorkshire
- Ambulance: Yorkshire

Ryton is a hamlet and former civil parish 19 miles (31 km) from York, now in the parish of Habton, in the county of North Yorkshire, England. In 1961 the parish had a population of 124.

It was part of the Ryedale district between 1974 and 2023. It is now administered by North Yorkshire Council.

== History ==
The name "Ryton" means 'Farm/settlement on the River Rye'. Ryton was recorded in the Domesday Book as Ritone. Ryton was called Ritun and Ritone in 11th century, Rihtuna and Rictona in the 12th century and Richton in the 13th century. Ryton was formerly a township in the parish of Kirby Misperton, from 1866 Ryton was a civil parish in its own right, on 1 April 1986 the parish was abolished and merged with Great Habton and Little Habton to form Habton. "Riton" is a name recorded in historical writing.

== See also ==
- Listed buildings in Habton
