= Wilton, Ryedale =

Village and civil parish in North Yorkshire, England

Coordinates: 54.23464°N 0.68078°W

Wilton
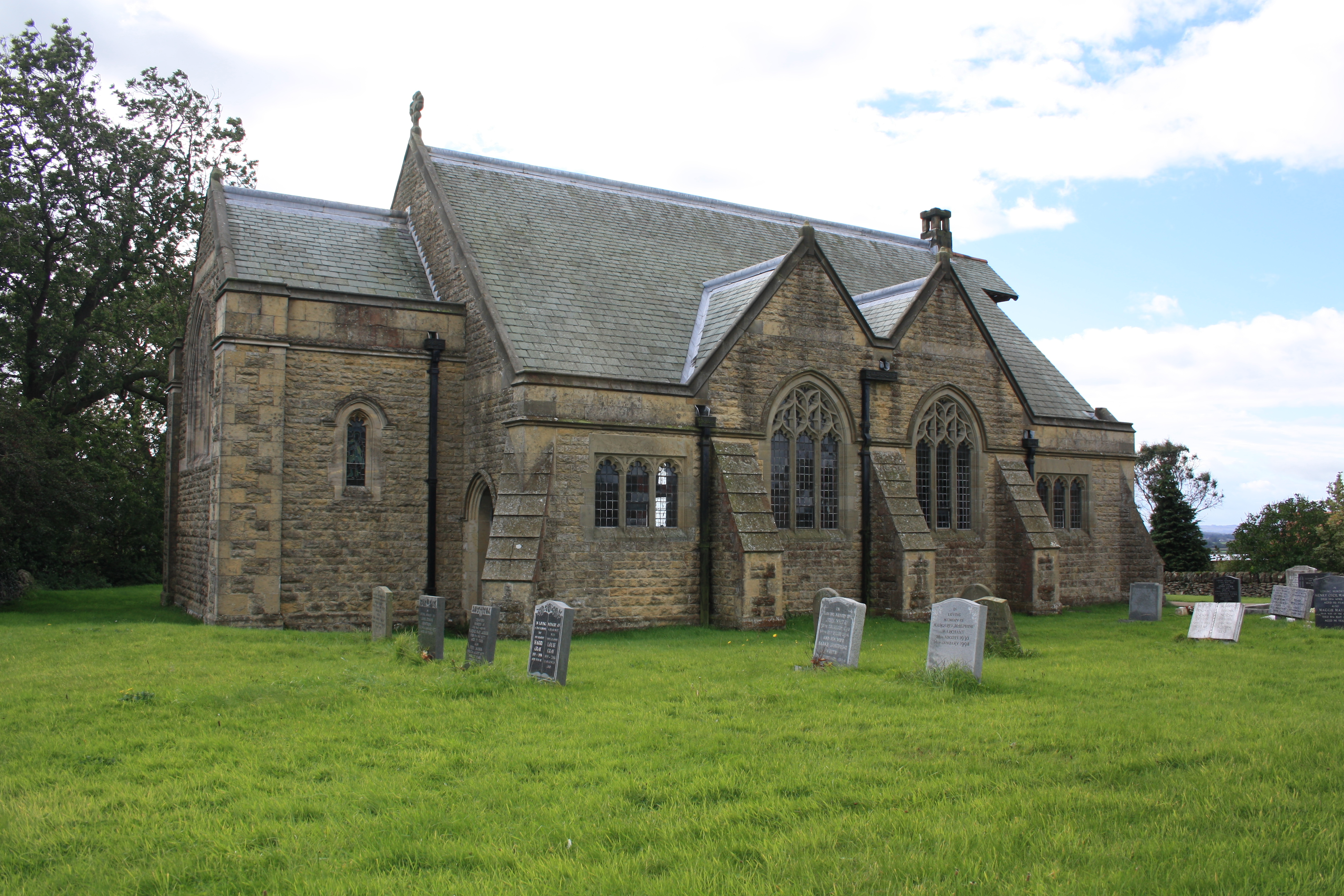
- St Georges Church

- Location within North Yorkshire
- Population: 149 (2011 census)
- OS grid reference: SE860829
- Civil parish: Wilton
- Unitary authority: North Yorkshire
- Ceremonial county: North Yorkshire
- Region: Yorkshire and the Humber
- Country: England
- Sovereign state: United Kingdom
- Post town: PICKERING
- Postcode district: YO18
- Police: North Yorkshire
- Fire: North Yorkshire
- Ambulance: Yorkshire
- UK Parliament: Thirsk and Malton

Wilton is a small village and civil parish near Pickering in North Yorkshire, England. The village is 4 miles (6.4 km) east of Pickering, 12 miles (19 km) west of Scarborough, and 10 miles (16 km) north-east of Malton.

== History ==
Wilton is mentioned in the Domesday Book as belonging to William the Conqueror, and having 47 ploughlands and associated meadowland. The name Wilton shares a common root with Wilton in what is now Redcar and Cleveland, and Bishop's Wilton in the East Riding. All are thought to be from Wildetuna, meaning waste; all three were described in the Domesday survey as having parts which were waste. The Inclosure Act 1773 provided for up to 700 acres (280 ha) of land to be divided up.

When the Forge Valley Line opened in 1882, a station was named Wilton, though it was in the parish of Allerston, 1.5 miles (2.4 km) south-east of Wilton. This station was later renamed to Ebberston, c. 1903. The nearest railway stations now are either at Malton to the south-west, or Scarborough and Seamer to the east. The A170 road between Thirsk and Scarborough runs through the village, with up to eight buses per day each way between Pickering and Scarborough. Wilton is 200 feet (61 m) above sea level, and 4 miles (6.4 km) east of Pickering, 12 miles (19 km) west of Scarborough, and 10 miles (16 km) north-east of Malton.

St George's Church, Wilton was built between 1907 and 1908 by Charles Hodgson Fowler, replacing an earlier structure which burnt down. The previous church was a chapel-of-ease to the main church, the Church of St Hilda, within the old parish that Wilton fell under (Ellerburn). The church is now a grade II listed building, and retains c. 13th century walls on the south side. To the south and south-east of the church grounds are the remains of Wilton Hall moated site. This is a scheduled monument.

== Governance ==
Wilton was part of the Parish of Pickering until 1233, when it became part of the former civil parish of Ellerburn-cum-Farmanby. The village came under the wapentake and liberty of Pickering Lythe, then later becoming part of the Pickering Rural District. In 1974, it was moved into the newer county of North Yorkshire (from the North Riding of Yorkshire),. From 1974 to 2023 it was part of the district of Ryedale, it is now administered by the unitary North Yorkshire Council. The village is represented at Westminster as part of the Thirsk and Malton Constituency.

Population of Wilton 1801–2015
1801	1811	1821	1831	1841	1851	1861	1871	1881	1891	1901	1911	1921	1931	1951	1961	1971	2001	2011	2015
186	209	203	192	216	202	181	191	168	151	133	129	119	110	109	117	126	124	149	160 (Note: Estimated population.)

During the late 14th century, a poll tax was enacted to raise money for the war against the French. Wilton was assessed as having 13 dwellings with a population of 45.

== See also ==
- Listed buildings in Wilton, Ryedale
