= Little Habton =

Village and former civil parish in North Yorkshire, England

Coordinates: 54°11′07.7″N 0°51′18.5″W

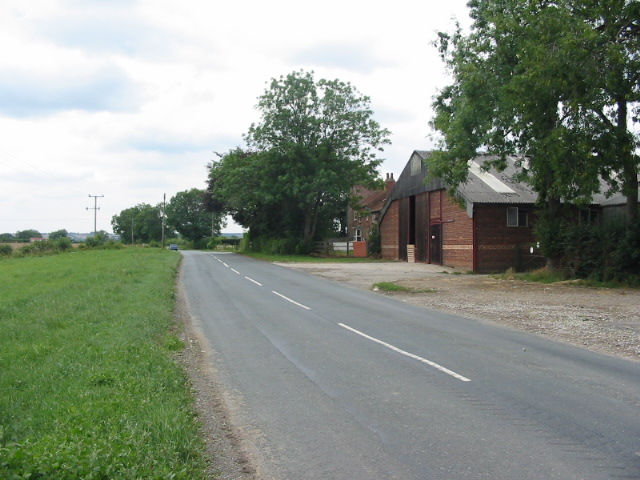
- Habton Grange Farm

- Location within North Yorkshire
- OS grid reference: SE7477
- Civil parish: Habton
- Unitary authority: North Yorkshire
- Ceremonial county: North Yorkshire
- Region: Yorkshire and the Humber
- Country: England
- Sovereign state: United Kingdom
- Police: North Yorkshire
- Fire: North Yorkshire
- Ambulance: Yorkshire

Little Habton is a hamlet and former civil parish, now currently in the parish of Habton, in North Yorkshire, England. In 1961, it had a population of 59.

It was part of the Ryedale district between 1974 and 2023. It is now administered by North Yorkshire Council.

== History ==
The name "Habton" means 'Hab(b)a's farm/settlement'. Little Habton was recorded in the Domesday Book as Abbetune/Abetune/Habetun. Little Habton was formerly a township in the parish of Kirby Misperton, from 1866, Little Habton was a civil parish in its own right, on 1 April 1986 the parish was abolished and merged with Great Habton and Ryton to form Habton.

== See also ==
- Listed buildings in Habton
