= Great Habton =

Village in North Yorkshire, England

Coordinates: 54°10′39″N 0°50′20″W

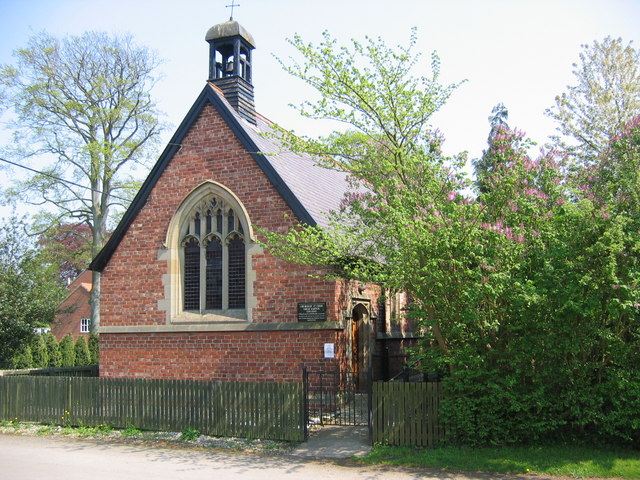

- Location within North Yorkshire
- Civil parish: Habton
- Unitary authority: North Yorkshire
- Ceremonial county: North Yorkshire
- Region: Yorkshire and the Humber
- Country: England
- Sovereign state: United Kingdom
- Police: North Yorkshire
- Fire: North Yorkshire
- Ambulance: Yorkshire

Great Habton is a village and former civil parish about 18 miles from York, now in the parish of Habton, in the county of North Yorkshire, England. In 1961 the parish had a population of 103.

It was part of the Ryedale district between 1974 and 2023. It is now administered by North Yorkshire Council.

== Amenities ==
St Chad's Church, Great Habton is the village's Anglican church. The village also has a pub called The Grapes Inn.

== History ==
The name "Habton" means 'Hab(b)a's farm/settlement'. Great Habton was recorded in the Domesday Book as Abbetune/Abetune/Habetun. Great Habton was formerly a township in the parish of Kirby Misperton, from 1866 Great Habton was a civil parish in its own right, on 1 April 1986 the parish was abolished and merged with Little Habton and Ryton to form Habton.

== See also ==
- Listed buildings in Habton
