= Lady Lumley's Almshouses =

Building in Thornton-le-Dale, North Yorkshire, England

Coordinates: 54.2367°N 0.7198°W

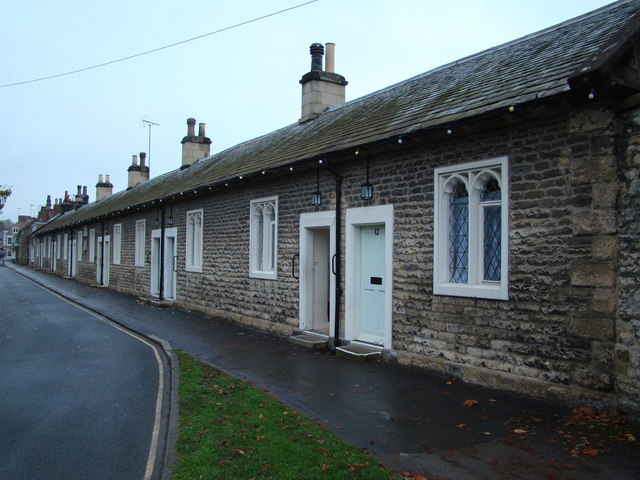
The building, in 2011

Lady Lumley's Almshouses are a historic building in Thornton-le-Dale, a village in North Yorkshire, in England.

The almshouses were built using funding from Elizabeth Lumley, placed in trust in 1656, but the building was only completed in 1670. The building was restored in the 19th century, then in the 20th century was extended and modernised. It was renovated in 2014 and again in 2025. It now provides 12 one-bedroom bungalows for elderly people with links to the area. The building was grade II listed in 1953.

The almshouses are built of limestone, with a moulded eaves cornice, and a stone flag roof. They have one storey, 24 bays and later rear extensions. The doorways are paired and have plain surrounds, and the windows have two lights with cinquefoil heads and stone surrounds. In the centre is an inscribed tablet.

== See also ==
- Listed buildings in Thornton-le-Dale
