= Thornton-le-Dale =

Village and civil parish in North Yorkshire, England

Coordinates: 54°14′09″N 0°43′22″W

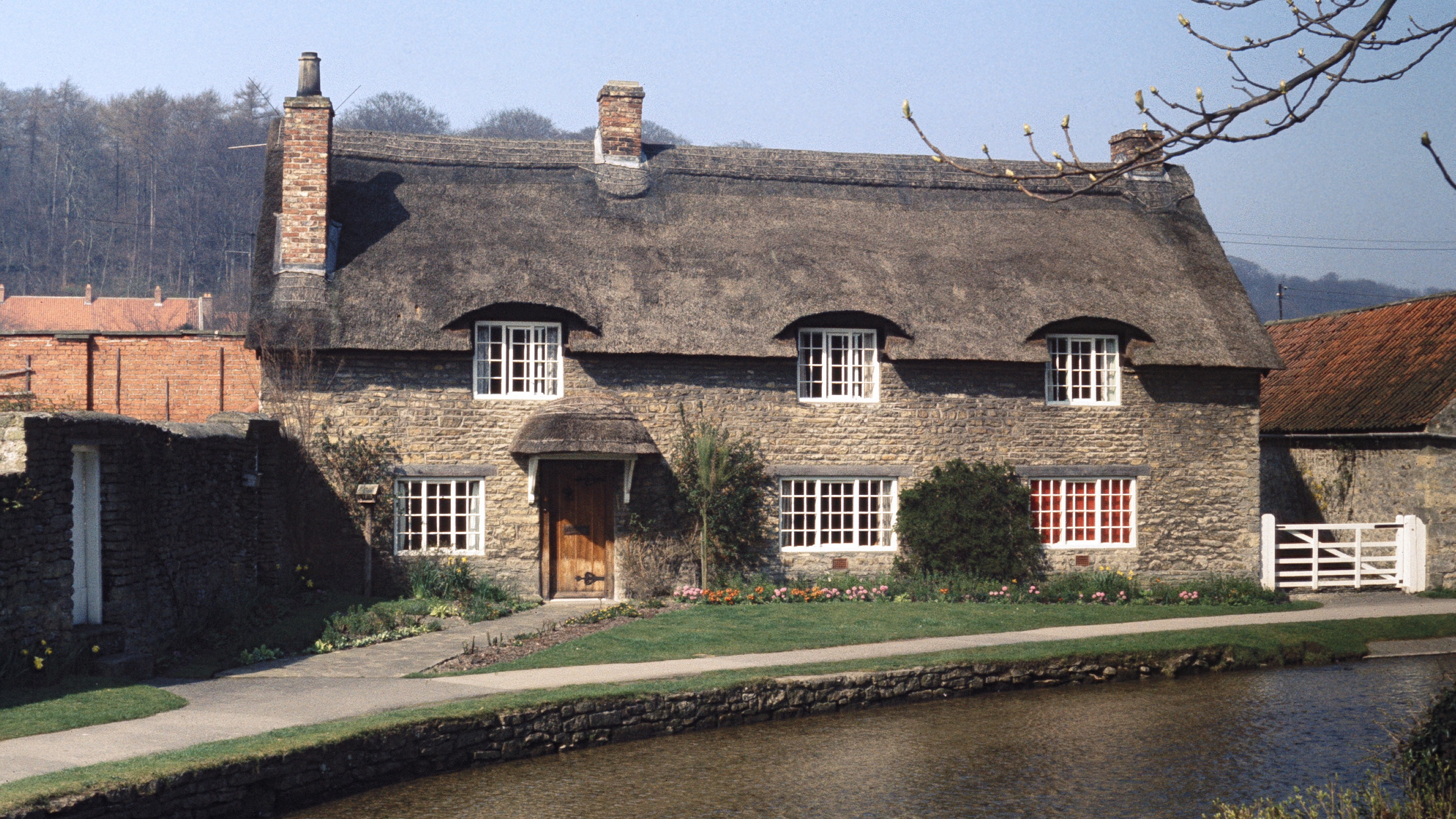
- A traditional cottage, known as Beck Isle Cottage

- Location within North Yorkshire
- Population: 1,759 (2011 Census)
- OS grid reference: SE834830
- Unitary authority: North Yorkshire
- Ceremonial county: North Yorkshire
- Region: Yorkshire and the Humber
- Country: England
- Sovereign state: United Kingdom
- Post town: PICKERING
- Postcode district: YO18
- Dialling code: 01751
- Police: North Yorkshire
- Fire: North Yorkshire
- Ambulance: Yorkshire
- UK Parliament: Thirsk and Malton

Thornton-le-Dale (also called Thornton Dale) is a village and civil parish in North Yorkshire, England, about 3 miles (5 km) east of Pickering on the edge of the North York Moors National Park. The area of the village encompasses 39.2 square kilometres.

A thatched building, called Beck Isle or Thatched Cottage and Grade II listed, was built in the 17th century and modified/extended in the 20th. The building has appeared on countless calendars and chocolate boxes over the years. A new thatched roof was installed in 2014. A stream, the Thornton Beck, meanders along the streets and is crossed by several bridges. Much of the village was designated as a Conservation Area by the North York Moors Park Authority in 1977. Thornton-le-Dale is often regarded as one of the prettiest villages in Yorkshire.

The village lies on the A170 road from Thirsk to Scarborough within the National Park. The route of the White Rose Way, a long-distance walk from Leeds to Scarborough, also passes through.

== History ==
The area has been inhabited since at least the Neolithic era. A burial cart discovered nearby, at Pexton Moor, is estimated to have been made in 300 BC. The name of the village is thought to have been given by the Angles who settled here circa AD 500–540, after conquering the locals. An etymology report suggests that the name Thornton derives from the Old English lemmas þorn and tūn, "town of thorn bushes".

Prior to the Norman Conquest, the area was under the rule of Saxon lords. In the Domesday Book of 1086, the settlement, with a population of 30, appears in three entries; it was then known as Torentune. Other nearby small settlements included Roxby, Farmanby, Thornton, Ellerburn and Leidtorp; four of these eventually joined to become the village. In 1066, the Lord was Earl Morcar and by 1086, the Crown (King William) owned this area; it was later transferred to Count Odo and his wife. By 1281, a Manor was built here, owned by John De Easton. In 1661, the owner was the Hill family; they built a new manor on the site of the old one. A 1921 report indicated the owner as Captain Richard Hill. Known as The Hall, and Grade II* listed, the manor is now a residential care home for the elderly. The building's origins are stated as 17th century, "probably with earlier origins".

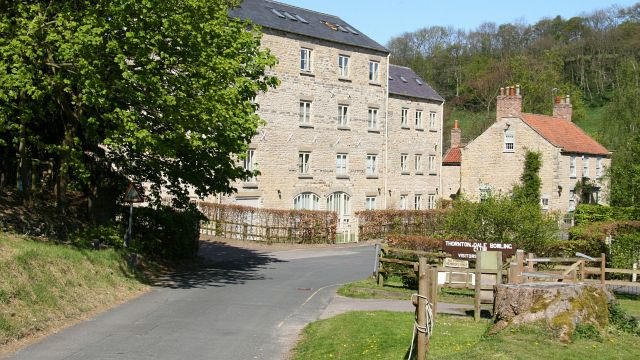
Thornton Mill and Mill House (2007 photo)

There was a mill on Thornton Beck from at least 1200; the current mill was built in the 18th century and enlarged in 1919, when it was renamed Victory Mill. For nearly a century, the Burgess animal feed company has owned the mill, initially using it for manufacturing its products, and later as offices. By 2003, the building had been restored. As early as 1277, there was also a mill at Ellerburn. Weaving was a common industry from the 14th to the 18th century. The beck was diverted in the 19th century when a large mill complex with sluice gates was built.

In the Middle Ages, Roxby, just west of the village, was a separate manor, which fell into the hands of the Cholmeley family in 1499. Sir Hugh Cholmeley, 1st Baronet, was born at Roxby Castle, then known as Thorton-on-the-Hill. The remains on Roxby Hill are a Scheduled Ancient Monument although none of the buildings remain. The area is also Grade II listed as "ridge and furrow earthworks [and] cultivation strips".

Richard Rolle, the English hermit mystic, was probably born in Thornton-le-Dale in the 1300s. He authored many books on religious topics.

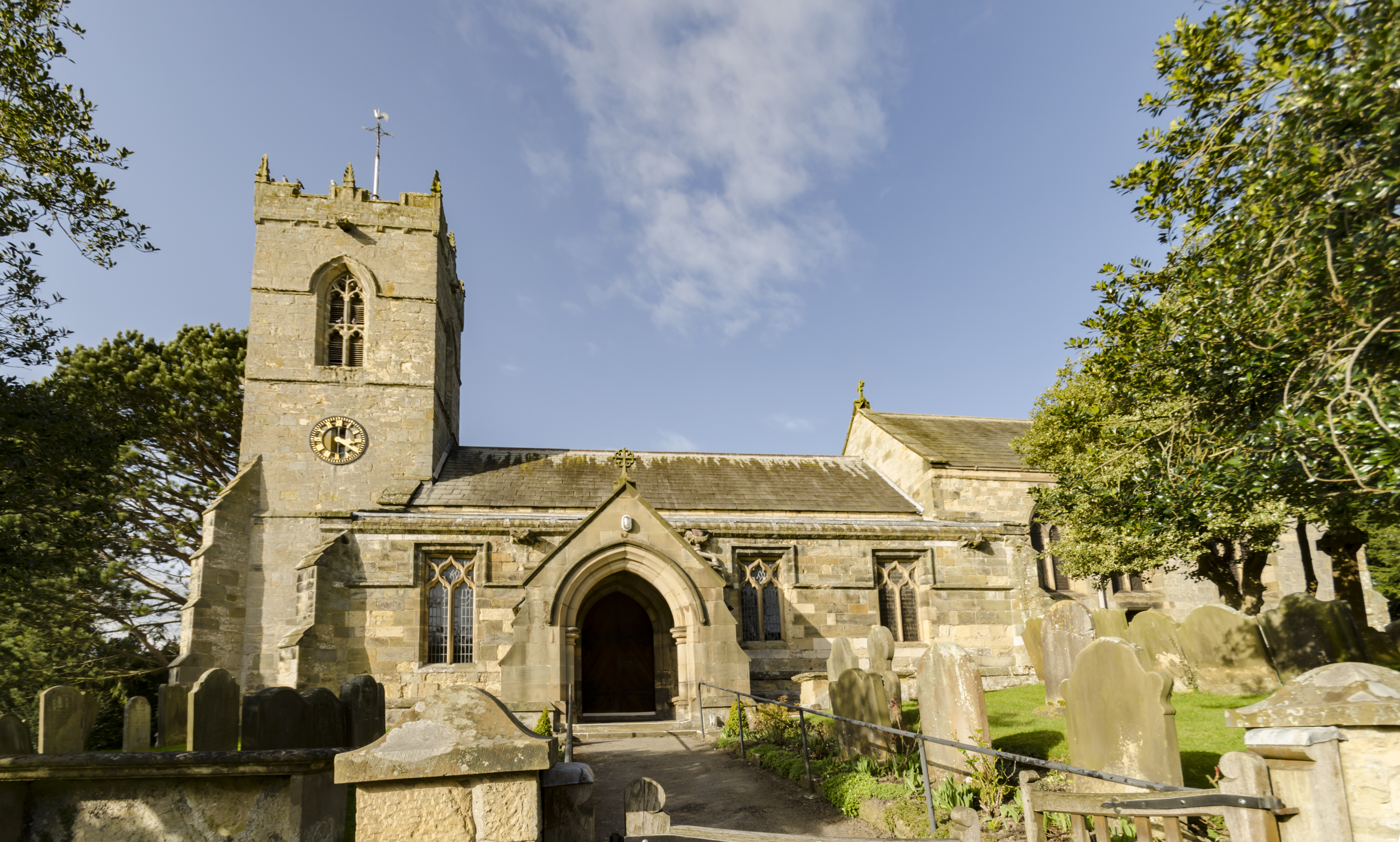
All Saints' church

All Saints' Church, Thornton-le-Dale is Grade II listed. It is centuries old and was altered several times: entirely rebuilt in the 14th century, although some earlier aspects still remain, and modified in 1681 and 1865. The existing copy of the church register includes listings as far back as 1538. Comber House, the former rectory on Church Hill, designed c. 1840 by J. P. Prichett, is also Grade II listed.

St Hilda's Church, Grade II* listed, is in the tiny village of Ellerburn which is part of Thornton-le-Dale. The original building dates to the early Norman period, and according to some sources, to the Saxon era, as early as 850 or 1050. It was restored and modified in 1904–1905 and in 1911. Today, there are a few other churches in or near Thornton-le-Dale.

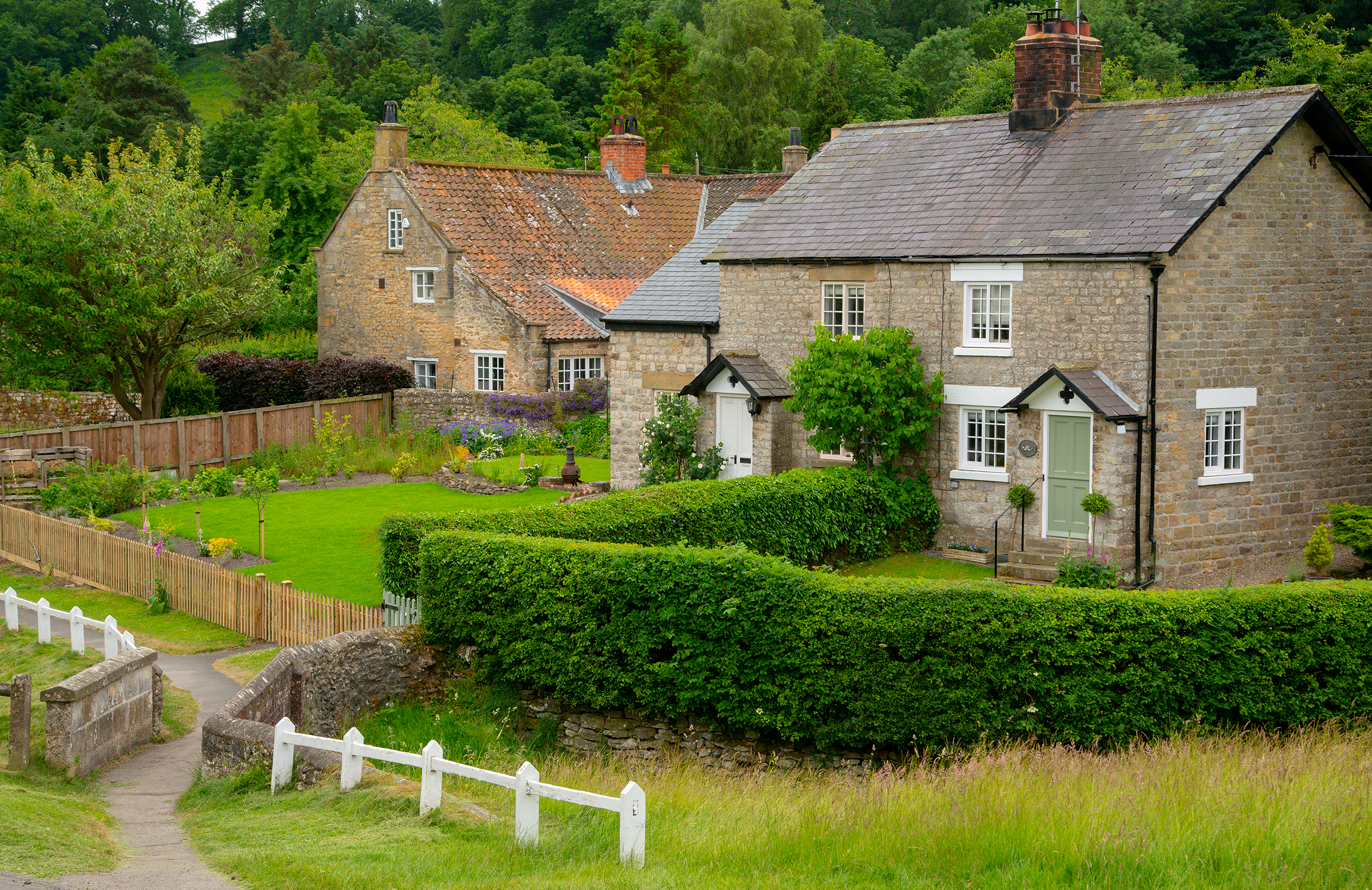
Historic buildings

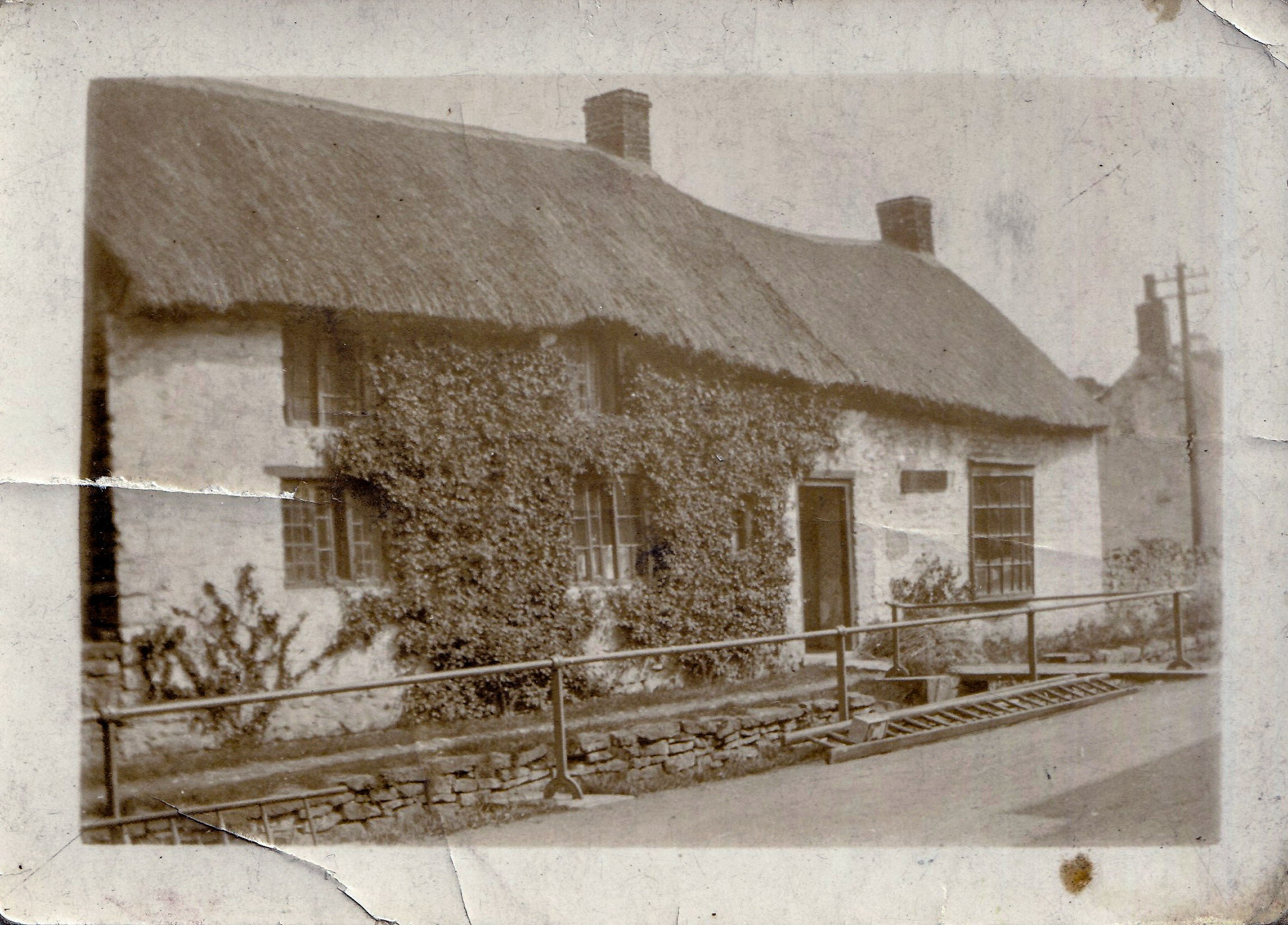
Now-demolished thatched cottage

In 1657, builders were given orders to erect 12 almshouses and a school, thanks to an endowment left by Elizabeth, Viscountess Lumley who had died earlier that year; her family had owned much of the land in the area. The buildings, between the village green and the bridge, completed in 1670, are supported by the Lady Lumley's Almshouse Trust. The 12 bungalows were restored in the 19th century, and in 2014, a major renovation was completed by the Trust on the Grade II listed buildings. They have been inhabited for some time as age-specific housing. Beck Isle (Thatched) Cottage was also built in the 1600s but was "raised, renovated and extended" in the 20th century. A book published in 2012 included photos of the Thatched Cottage circa 1920's, and stated that in that era, the building was covered in plaster and had significantly fewer windows. As of 2021, the cottage was identified as a freehold private residence.

The Old Grammar School had space for 200 students but had only 16 as of 1890; the building remained in use as a school until the 20th century; it is now used for other purposes. Another school, the Lady Lumley's School in nearby Pickering, is still in use, as a coeducational secondary school and sixth form. The only current school in Thornton Dale is the CE School school, with 133 students in 2018, operated by the Church of England.

In 1801, the population was 1,041. By 1831, it had increased to 1,368.

The village used to have a railway station on the Forge Valley Line between Seamer and Pickering. The trains first arrived in 1839 but the Pickering-Scarborough branch was not completed here until 1882. Some agricultural workers left the area on the train, seeking paid jobs elsewhere. The Thornton Dale railway station opened in 1882 and closed to passengers in 1950, with a freight train from a quarry in the village continuing to use the tracks until 1964. After being used for several purposes, including offices and a caravan park, the station was converted into three holiday rental cottages.

It was in 1907 that the village was first deemed as the "prettiest" in Yorkshire; voters in this poll were the readers of a newspaper. By that time, the village was considered to be a tourist hotspot.

== Governance ==
Thornton-le-Dale is in the Thirsk and Malton constituency, which is represented in the UK Parliament by Kevin Hollinrake of the Conservative Party.

From 1974 until 2023 Thornton-le-Dale was part of the district of Ryedale in the county of North Yorkshire. Since 2023, it has been part of the unitary authority area of North Yorkshire. Thornton-le-Dale is part of the Thornton Dale and the Wolds electoral division, which is represented on the North Yorkshire Council by Janet Sanderson of the Conservative Party.

As a civil parish, Thornton-le-Dale also has a parish council, which has seven members and meets monthly at the Hill Memorial Institute. Meetings are open to the public.

== Tourism ==
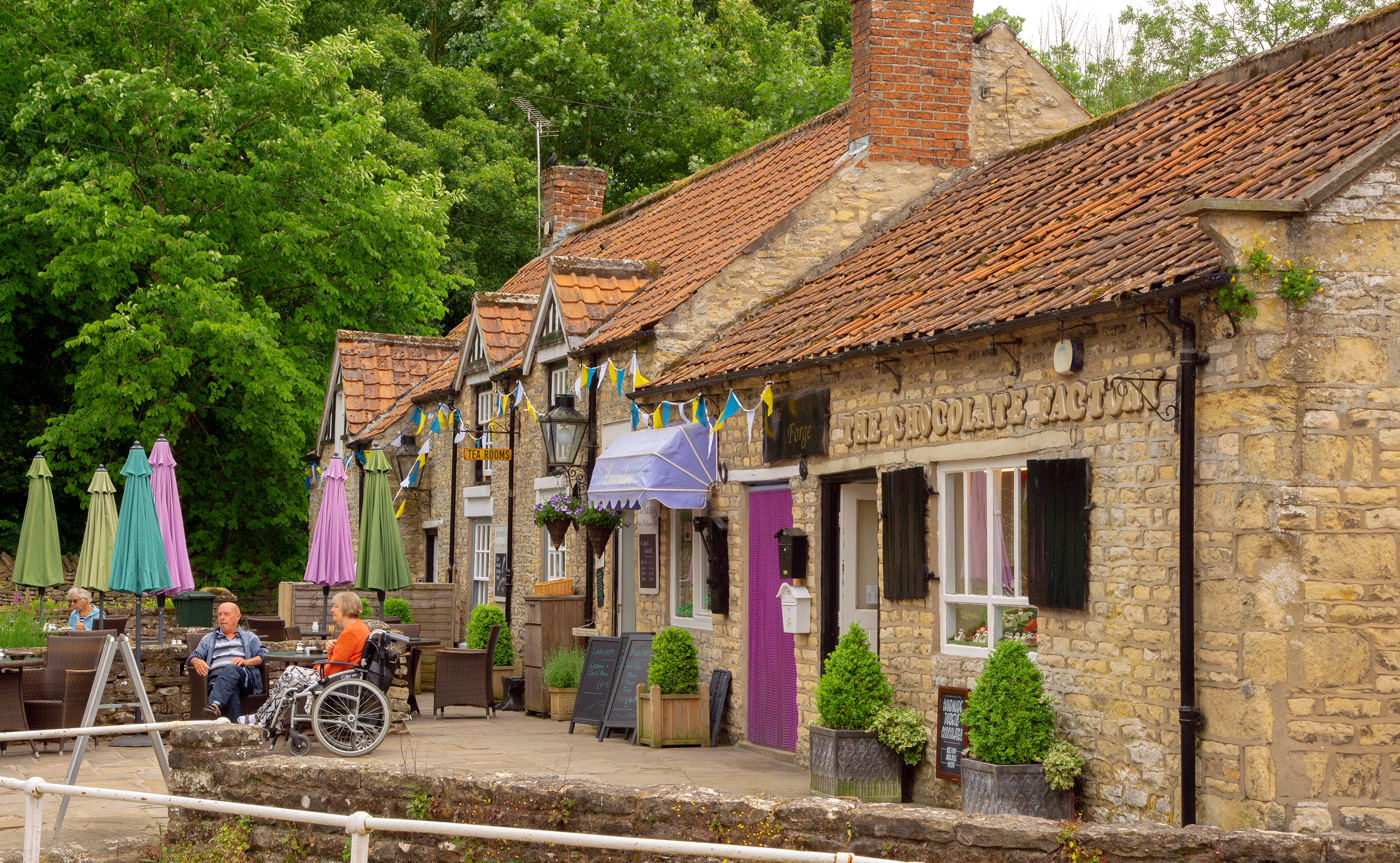
Shops in the Square, in an area known as The Forge

The tourist era in this area was underway by the early 1900s and in 1907, Thornton-le-Dale was named Yorkshire's Prettiest Village in a newspaper poll; it remains popular with tourists. Such visitors fuel the economy, with many visiting the very quaint village with the ancient Thornton-le-Dale Market Cross, stocks on the small village green and small beck (stream). There are several cafes and pubs, as well as a seasonal tea room and many shops. Nearby, Dalby Forest offers paths for walking, cycling and nature-watching. The Information Point can provide visitors with a pamphlet providing specifics as to other walks from the village, including one to the tiny hamlet of Ellerburn.

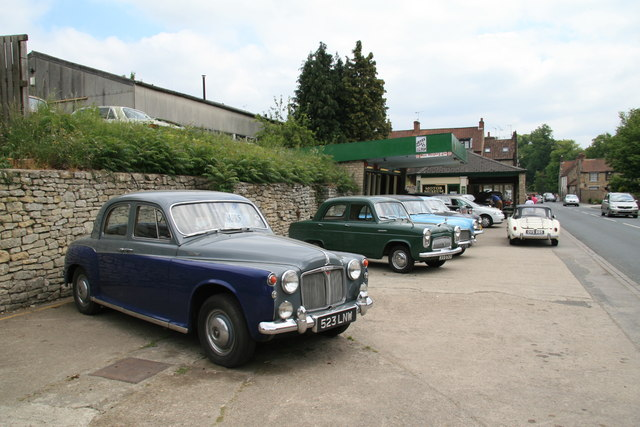
North Yorkshire Motor Museum in 2007

The village has a large car park area and is also served by buses such as the Coastliner's route 840 (Leeds to Whitby) and Route 128 on the East Yorkshire service.

A regular attraction is the Motor Museum, which exhibits a collection of classic and vintage cars from 1918 to 1976. The Mathewson family run a car and automobilia sales auction business, which is the subject of the television series 'Bangers & Cash' narrated by Toby Foster made for the Yesterday TV channel, with a spin-off series featuring Derek, Paul and Dave Mathewson named Restoring Classics. Even earlier, in 1906, there was a display of "vintage vehicles" at a garage in the village.

Another attraction, Go Ape Dalby, provides zip lining opportunities in the Dalby Forest. The North Yorkshire Moors Railway in nearby Pickering offers rides on a steam or heritage diesel train on one of the historic lines in the area and is known to television viewers as the heritage line featured in Channel 5's The Yorkshire Steam Railway: All Aboard. The Beck Isle Museum features displays of historic sets and objects.

Stage Three of the 2018 Tour de Yorkshire started in Richmond and finished in Scarborough. The cyclists travelled through Thornton-le-Dale.

== Annual events ==
On the first Saturday in December, the Village Lights Committee (all volunteers) stage the annual Christmas lights 'Switch On'. This is the culmination of a whole year's work of raising money and putting up the lights around the village. Regular annual events include a Spring Gala held in May or June, the traditional rural Thornton Show and Scarecrow Festival, both in August, and Harvest Festivals held each September.

The Thornton le Dale players, formed in the 1940s, puts on plays in spring and summer, with a major production usually held in November at the village hall.

== See also ==
- Listed buildings in Thornton-le-Dale
