= Ellerburn =

Village in North Yorkshire, England

Coordinates: 54.24646°N 0.70979°W

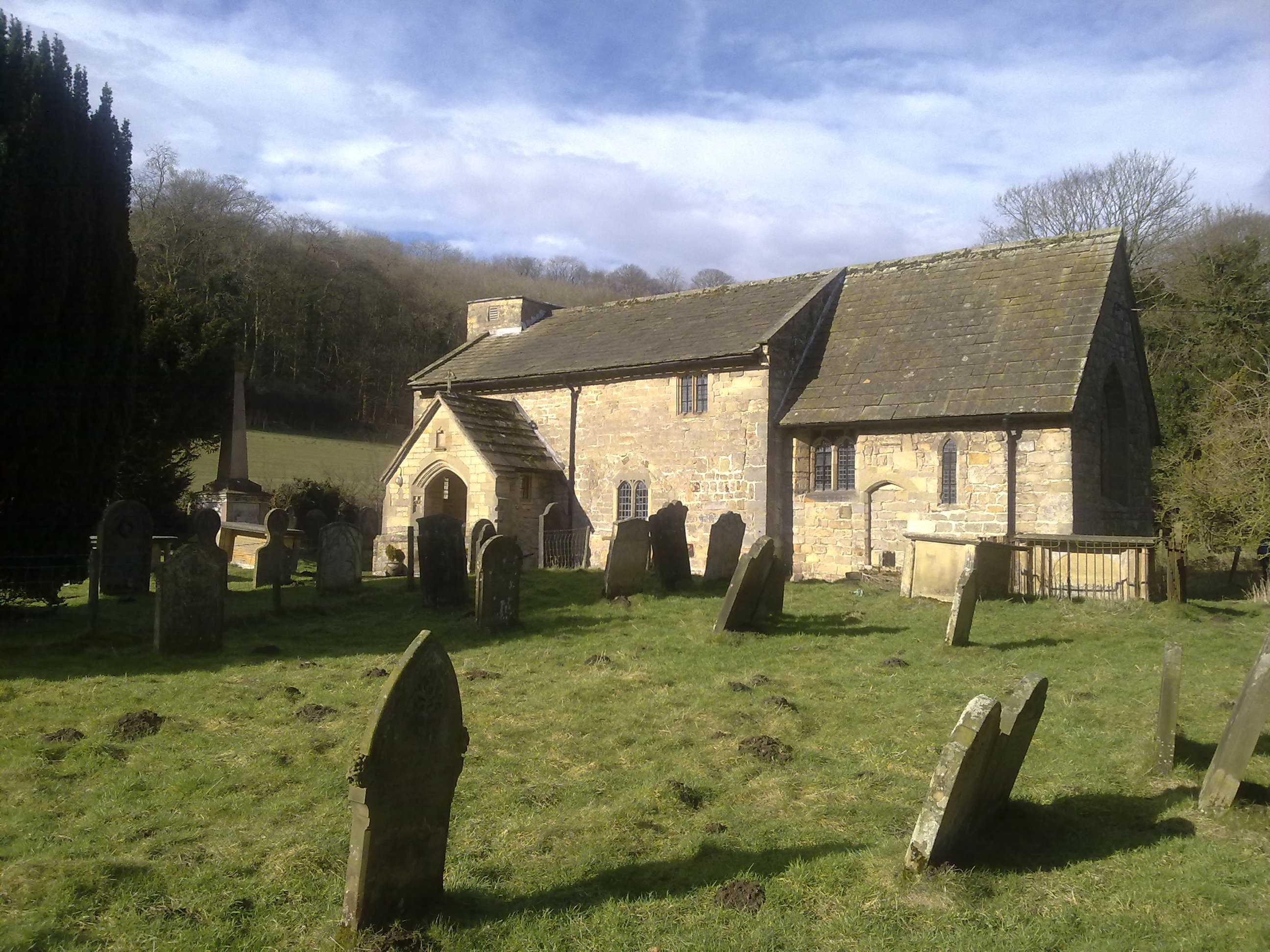
- St Hilda's Church in Ellerburn

- Location within North Yorkshire
- OS grid reference: SE841841
- Unitary authority: North Yorkshire
- Ceremonial county: North Yorkshire
- Region: Yorkshire and the Humber
- Country: England
- Sovereign state: United Kingdom
- Post town: PICKERING
- Postcode district: YO18
- Police: North Yorkshire
- Fire: North Yorkshire
- Ambulance: Yorkshire

Ellerburn is a village in the county of North Yorkshire, England, situated near Thornton-le-Dale, about 3 miles (4.8 km) east of Pickering. It is located in the North York Moors National Park.

It was part of the Ryedale district between 1974 and 2023. It is now administered by North Yorkshire Council.

== History ==
The tiny hamlet of Ellerburn was formerly an industrial area with paper mills and quarries. There is an ancient church, a Grade II listed building, which can boast some unconventional vicars. One in the 18th century stole stones to restore the church; another in the following century seems to have regularly fallen into the adjacent Thornton Beck and held services dripping wet.

Between 1316 and the middle of the 19th century, Ellerburn came under the parish of Ellerburn-cum-Farmanby. The area now belongs to the parish of Thornton-le-Dale.

== The Church of St Hilda ==
The original church of St Hilda building dates to the early Norman period, and according to some sources, to the Saxon era, as early as 850 or 1050. A number of carved stones from the 9th to 10th centuries incorporated in the walls. Four of the stones can be found to the left of the porch. A beautifully carved Anglo-Scandinavian style cross can be found on the south wall of the nave. The font is 11th century on a modern base.

The church was restored and modified in 1904–1905 and in 1911. During restoration an early building was found as well as an ancient altar stone which was reinstalled.

This church is similar in style and age to St Gregory's Minster in Kirkdale.

== See also ==
- Listed buildings in Thornton-le-Dale
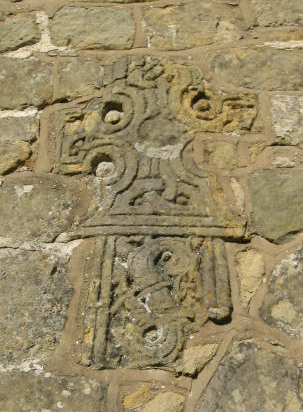
Viking carved stone cross

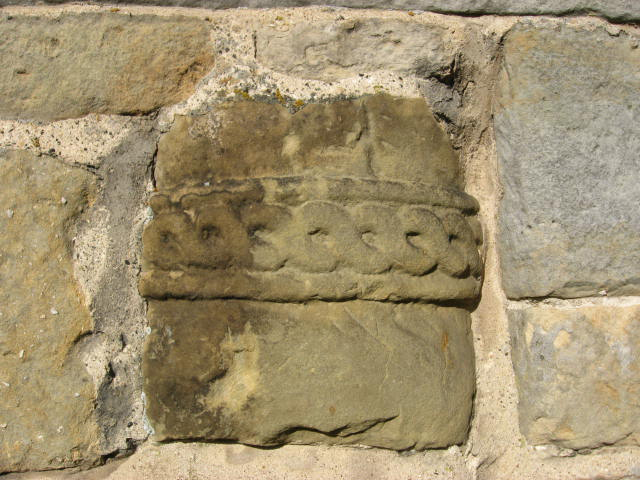
9th or 10th century column with ropework decoration

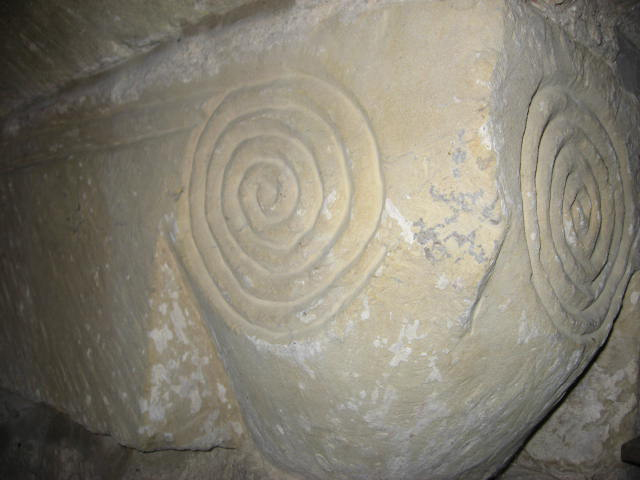
Arch support carved with ammonites
