= St Stephen's Church, Snainton =

Church in Snainton, North Yorkshire, England

Coordinates: 54°13′44″N 0°35′29″W

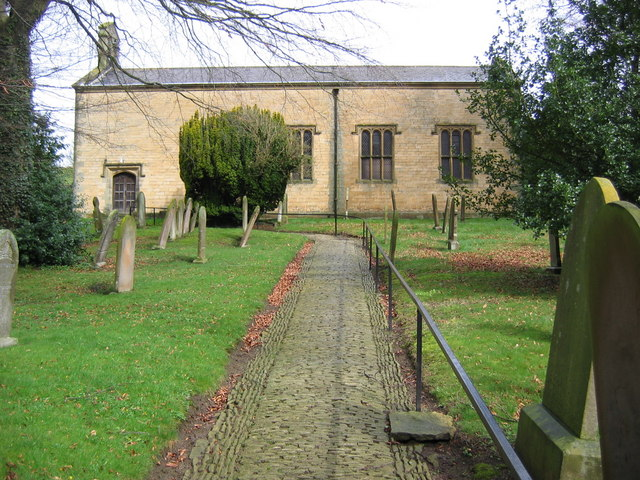
The building, in 2006

St Stephen's Church is an Anglican church in Snainton, a village in North Yorkshire, in England.

Snainton has long been part of the parish of All Saints' Church, Brompton, but a small chapel of ease was constructed in the 12th century. It was a small, rectangular, building, with a bellcote and an elaborate doorway. It was demolished in the 1830s, and most of its stonework used to construct a new churchyard wall. A replacement church, to a design by John Barry, was completed in 1836. In the early 20th century, it was decorated internally, and an oak chancel screen was erected. The building was grade II listed in 1967.

The church is built of sandstone on a chamfered plinth, with quoins, a moulded eaves cornice, and a slate roof with coped gables. It consists of a nave and a chancel in one unit, with a bellcote on the west gable. On the south front is an arched doorway with carved spandrels and a hood mould. To the right are four mullioned and transomed windows with three arched lights, and flat hood moulds. Inside is the 12th-century font from the old chapel, which is plain and circular.

== See also ==
- Listed buildings in Snainton
