= Forge Valley line =

Disused railway line in North Yorkshire, England

Forge Valley Line
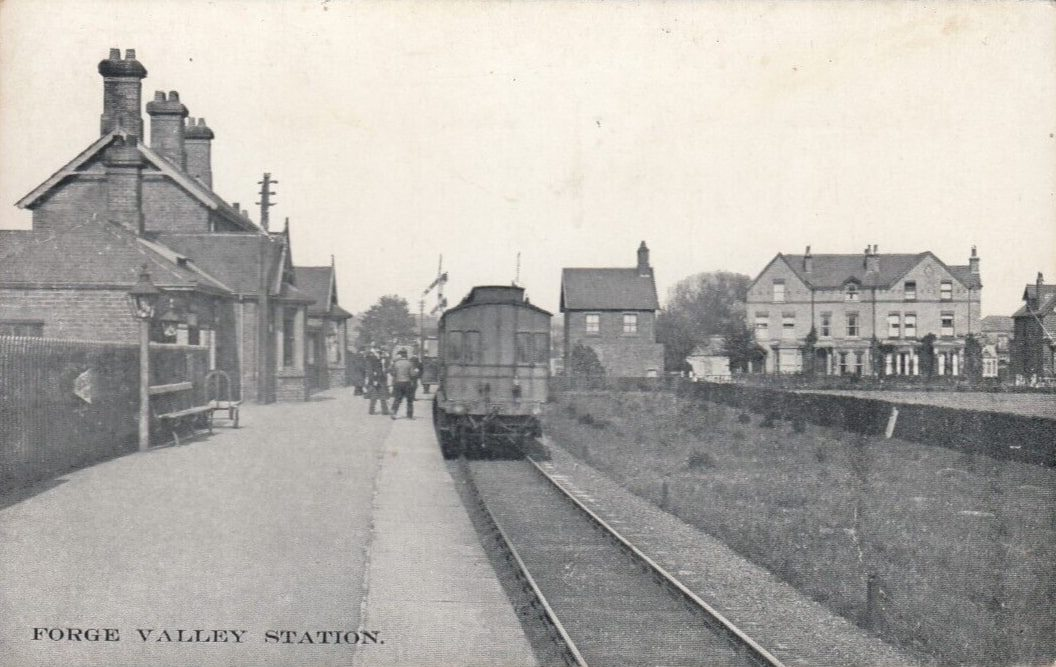
- Forge Valley station c. 1910

Overview
- Owner: North Eastern Railway, London and North Eastern Railway, British Railways
- Termini: Seamer; Pickering
- Stations: 6

History
- Opened: 1 May 1882
- Opened: 1882
- Closed to passengers: 1950
- Closed to all traffic: 1963
- Closed: 25 January 1953

Technical
- Line length: 16 mi (26 km)
- Number of tracks: 1
- Track gauge: 4 ft 8 1/2 in (1,435 mm)

The Forge Valley Line was a 16-mile-long branch of the North Eastern Railway between Seamer and Pickering, in North Yorkshire, England. The line was intended to link Scarborough with Pickering. It opened in 1882 and closed in 1950, with the exception of a stretch from Pickering to Thornton Dale which remained open for quarry traffic until 1963.

The line did not pass through Forge Valley, but the station in the village of West Ayton was named after it to avoid confusion with another station — Great Ayton — already owned by the North Eastern Railway.

== History ==
A railway running east–west across the Vale of Pickering was first proposed in 1864. The intent was that this line would actually travel up the Forge Valley and connect with a line between Whitby and Scarborough at Scalby. However, due to local land owners objecting and the fact that the railway between Whitby and Scarborough had not been built, the idea was scrapped.

The North Eastern Railway (NER) pressed ahead with their plans for a railway across the northern edge of the Vale of Pickering, but drove the eastern end to meet up with the York–Scarborough line at Seamer. This route was opened on 1 May 1882. Earlier bills that had passed through Parliament had become known as Forge Valley because of the route they would take up the valley rather than across it. The NER's line was always known as Forge Valley too, but this was also down to the station at Forge Valley serving the villages of West and East Ayton; to avoid confusion with the station at Great Ayton, on the Nunthorpe-Battersby line, the name of Forge Valley was kept.

The line ran quite close to the Pickering to Scarborough Road (now the A170) and some of its stations were some distance from the villages that it claimed to serve. As a consequence, the rural bus service that started up in the 20th century took patronage away from the line and, despite using steam railcars and push-pull trains, the passenger numbers dropped.

The line closed to passengers completely in June 1950, with closure to all traffic between Thornton Dale and Seamer at the same time. Beyond that time, a small section extending for 2 1/2 miles (4 km) from Pickering to Thornton Dale was kept open to serve quarries at Thornton Dale. This last section was removed in January 1963.

== The route ==
The line covered 16 miles (26 km), or 19 miles (31 km) if the last 3 miles (4.8 km) from Seamer to Scarborough are included; it was single-tracked throughout, with a passing loop at Snainton. It had no major engineering works or gradients of note, with only a few sections steeper than 1 in 100. Six stations were constructed on the line, Forge Valley, Wykeham, Sawdon, Snainton, Ebberston and Thornton Dale.

== Post closure ==
Thornton Dale, Ebberston, Snainton and Sawdon have now been restored; there are also three camping coaches at Ebberston.

Wykeham also survives and there are plans to restore the station itself. Whilst the other stations on the line are completely restored, Forge Valley is now currently in use by North Yorkshire County Council as a road and highways depot.
