= Snainton Preceptory =

Priory in North Yorkshire, England

Coordinates: 54.2034°N 0.6002°W

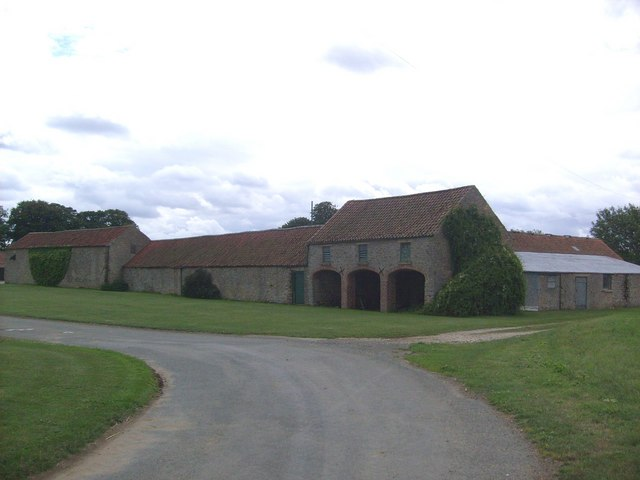
Foulbridge Farm, in 2010

Snainton Preceptory (also known as Foulbridge Priory) was a priory, just south of the village of Snainton, in North Yorkshire, England. The preceptory was started by the Knights Templar at Foulbridge which sits 1-mile (2 km) to the east of a Benedictine Priory at Yedingham. Both houses were on the River Derwent.

The preceptory was founded before 1226, but was suppressed between 1308 and 1312 and passed to the Knights Hospitaller in 1324, as confirmed by Edward II. The preceptory was given to the Archbishop of York in 1556, but it is unclear what happened afterwards.

Some of the buildings are now a grade I listed farmhouse and cottage. They consists of a timber framed aisled hall, much of which has been retained. It was enclosed in the 18th century by a farmhouse and cottage. These are in brick and have a pantile roof with coped gables and shaped kneelers. The house has two storeys, a double depth plan, and three bays. On the front is a porch with chamfered posts and a cornice, and the windows are sashes, those in the ground floor with wedge lintels.{

== See also ==
- Grade I listed buildings in North Yorkshire (district)
- Listed buildings in Snainton
