= Sawdon railway station =

Disused railway station in North Yorkshire, England

Sawdon
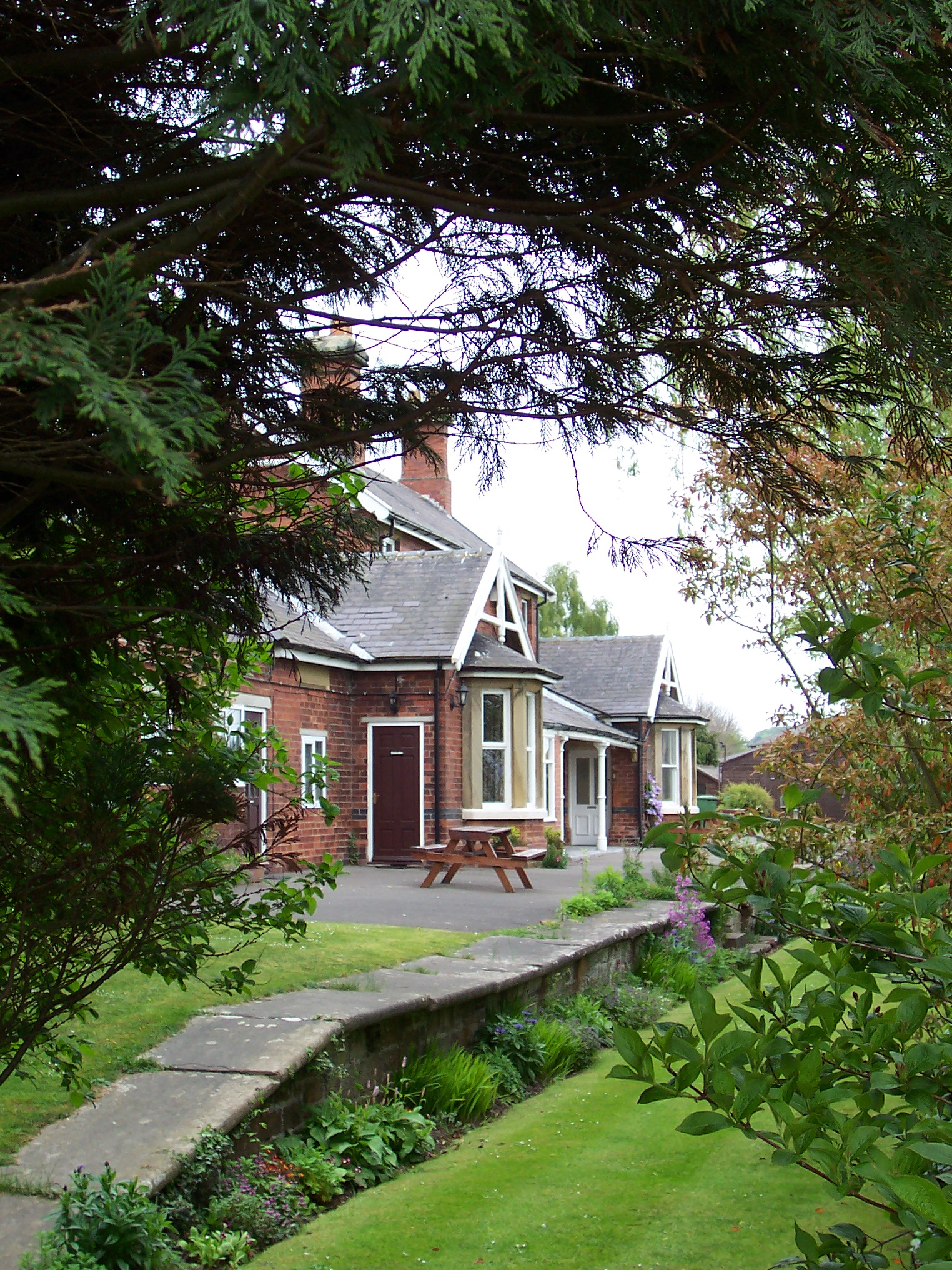
- The former station at Sawdon

General information
- Location: Brompton-by-Sawdon, North Yorkshire; England
- Coordinates: 54.222360°N 0.549250°W
- Grid reference: SE946817
- Platforms: 1

Other information
- Status: Disused

History
- Original company: North Eastern Railway
- Pre-grouping: North Eastern Railway
- Post-grouping: London and North Eastern Railway

Key dates
- 1882: opened
- 1950: closed
Location

Sawdon railway station was situated on the North Eastern Railway's Pickering to Seamer branch line in North Yorkshire, England. It served the village of Brompton-by-Sawdon and to a lesser extent Sawdon itself. The station was named Sawdon to distinguish it from an existing station called Brompton (on the Leeds Northern Railway), near Northallerton, also in North Yorkshire. The station opened to passenger traffic on 1 May 1882, and the last trains ran on 3 June 1950. Sawdon was furnished with one platform, which had the station building on the northern side of the running line, and a small goods yard beyond the station building with an east facing connection to the main railway line. The goods yard had a crane capable of lifting 1-tonne (1.1-ton), and was equipped to handle a variety of goods including live stock.

The station has been restored completely, as holiday accommodation.

Preceding station	Disused railways	Following station
Wykeham	Forge Valley Line	Snainton
