= Ebberston railway station =

Disused railway station in North Yorkshire, England

Ebberston
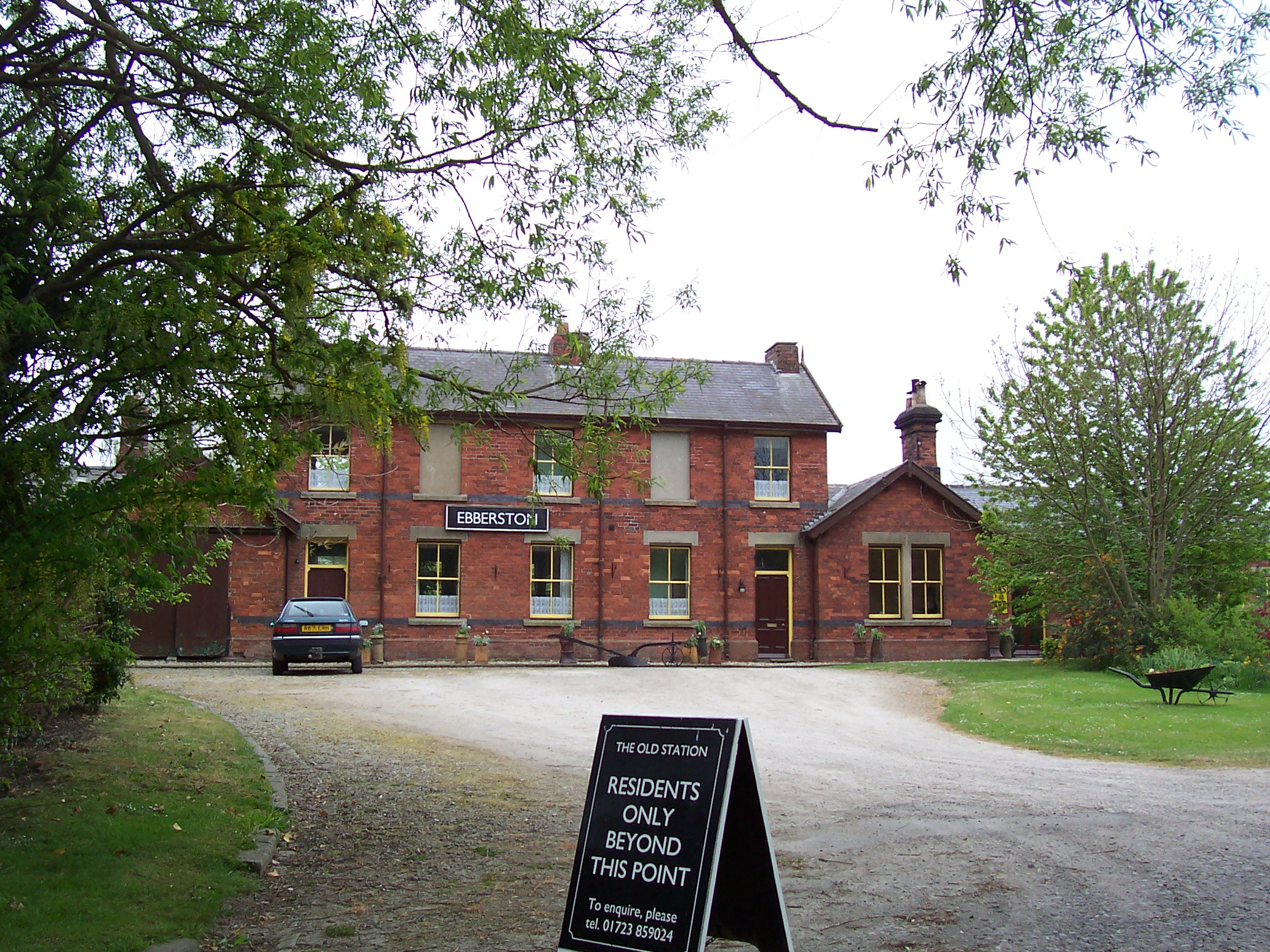
- The former station at Ebberston

General information
- Location: Allerston, North Yorkshire; England
- Coordinates: 54.225436°N 0.653200°W
- Grid reference: SE879819
- Platforms: 1

Other information
- Status: Disused

History
- Original company: North Eastern Railway
- Pre-grouping: North Eastern Railway
- Post-grouping: London and North Eastern Railway

Key dates
- 1 May 1882: Opened as Wilton
- 1 April 1903: Renamed to Ebberston
- 3 June 1950: closed
Location

Ebberston railway station was situated on the North Eastern Railway's Pickering to Seamer branch line. It served the villages of Allerston, Ebberston and Wilton. The station opened to passenger traffic on 1 May 1882, and closed on 3 June 1950. The station has been restored completely, with track laid along the platform. Three camping coaches are available for hire as holiday accommodation.

== History ==
The station opened in 1882 with the rest of the line, but was named Wilton. As the NER system developed and expanded, some stations were renamed; Wilton was renamed in April 1903 to Ebberston, the next nearest village, even though the station was actually closest to the village of Allerston. Hoole suggests that the station was not named Allerston to avoid confusion with the railway station named Allerton between York and Knaresborough. Ebberston was 5 3/4 miles (9.3 km) east of Pickering, 11 miles (18 km) west of Seamer, and almost 14 miles (23 km) west of Scarborough.

The station only had one platform, with the station buildings on the northern side, a small goods siding on the west side of the station accessed from the Thornton Dale direction, and a siding with a section of coal drops. The 1904 handbook of stations shows that the station was able to handle livestock and horseboxes, but no crane was listed and even though the station had associated buildings such as a weigh house, no goods shed seems to have been built.

Services consisted of four passenger trains each way, connecting Scarborough and Pickering. The final train ran on 3 June 1950, and recovery of the track was completed between 1952 and 1953. In 1998, three camping coaches were placed on a set of rails laid alongside the old platform.

| Preceding station | Disused railways | Following station |
|---|---|---|
| Snainton | Forge Valley Line | Thornton Dale |
