= Allerston =

Village and civil parish in North Yorkshire, England

Coordinates: 54.2309°N 0.6521°W

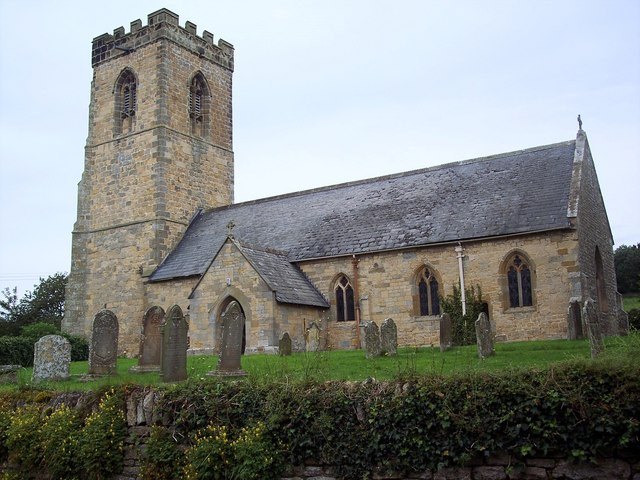
- St Johns Church

- Location within North Yorkshire
- Population: 302 (2011 census)
- OS grid reference: SE 878 825
- Unitary authority: North Yorkshire
- Ceremonial county: North Yorkshire
- Region: Yorkshire and the Humber
- Country: England
- Sovereign state: United Kingdom
- Post town: PICKERING
- Postcode district: YO18
- Police: North Yorkshire
- Fire: North Yorkshire
- Ambulance: Yorkshire
- UK Parliament: Thirsk and Malton

Allerston is a village and civil parish in North Yorkshire, England, about 5 miles (8 km) east of Pickering. According to the 2001 census, the parish had a population of 309, reducing slightly to 302 at the 2011 Census.

The parish church, originally dedicated to St Mary, is now dedicated to St John and is a grade II* listed building.

From 1974 to 2023 it was part of the district of Ryedale, it is now administered by the unitary North Yorkshire Council.

== Overview ==
The name Allerston derives from the Old English aelfheresstān meaning 'Aelfhere's stone'.

During the 1930s, unemployed men were set to work in Dalby Forest, breaking ground, building tracks, and undertaking other heavy labour. The men lived in a work camp in Low Dalby, which was one of a number of so-called Instructional Centres run by the Ministry of Labour in order to 'harden' young men who had been out of work for some time. By 1938, the Ministry was operating 35 Instructional Centres across Britain, with a total capacity of over 6,000 places. By 1939, though, unemployment was declining in the face of impending war, and the Ministry closed down its work camps.

The Cayley Arms, the village pub and Bed and Breakfast, is named after George Cayley the British Aviation Pioneer, who held lands in the surrounding area.

At the bottom of the village is Ebberston railway station of the now-closed Forge Valley Line. The station is now known as The Old Station and is run as a self-catering holiday accommodation business.

== See also ==
- Listed buildings in Allerston
