= Listed buildings in Allerston =

Allerston is a civil parish in the county of North Yorkshire, England. It contains ten listed buildings that are recorded in the National Heritage List for England. Of these, one is listed at Grade II*, the middle of the three grades, and the others are at Grade II, the lowest grade. The parish contains the village of Allerston and the surrounding countryside. Most of the listed buildings are houses, cottages and farmhouses, and the others consist of a church, a bank of limekilns, and a former cornmill.

== Key ==
| Grade | Criteria |
|---|---|
| II* | Particularly important buildings of more than special interest |
| II | Buildings of national importance and special interest |

== Buildings ==
| Name and location | Photograph | Date | Notes | Grade |
|---|---|---|---|---|
| St John's Church; 54.23442°N 0.65413°W | | 14th century | The church has been altered and extended through the centuries, including a restoration and alterations in the 19th century. It is built in sandstone with a slate roof, and consists of a nave and a chancel under a continuous roof, a south porch, and a west tower. The tower has three stages, diagonal buttresses, a recessed west doorway with a pointed arch and a hood mould, two-light bell openings, a corbel table carved with motifs, and an embattled parapet. The chancel has a priest's door with an ogee head. | II* |
| Mill Cottage; 54.23219°N 0.65370°W | — | Mid 18th century | The cottage is in whitewashed sandstone and a pantile roof. There are two storeys and attics and two bays, and a lower narrow bay to the left containing the doorway. The windows are a mix of casements and horizontally-sliding sashes. | II |
| Farmhouse southwest of Derwent Farmhouse; 54.20594°N 0.63623°W | — | Mid to late 18th century | The farmhouse is in sandstone, partly rendered, with a pantile roof, coped gables and shaped kneelers. There are two storeys and two bays, and a lower two-storey bay on the left. In the centre is a doorway, the windows are casements, and all the openings have lintels with triple keystones. | II |
| Rhodelands; 54.23168°N 0.65303°W | — | Mid to late 18th century | The house is in sandstone on a plinth, with quoins and a pantile roof. There are two storeys, a main block of two bays, and a lower two-bay wing to the left. Some windows are fixed, and others are casements or horizontally-sliding sashes. The ground floor openings have tooled lintels. | II |
| Allerston Manor; 54.23507°N 0.65487°W | — | Late 18th century | The house, which incorporates earlier material, is in sandstone on a plinth, with a moulded eaves cornice, and a pantile roof with coped gables. There are two storeys and five bays, and at the rear is a continuous outshut. The central doorway has a divided fanlight, and the windows are sashes, those in the ground floor with quoined surrounds. | II |
| Allerston Partings Farmhouse; 54.23682°N 0.63896°W | | Late 18th century | The farmhouse is in limestone, and has a pantile roof with coped gables and kneelers. There are two storeys and three bays, and a rear wing. The central doorway has a fanlight, and the windows are sashes; those in the upper floor and at the rear are horizontally sliding. All the openings have lintels with triple keystones. | II |
| Low Farmhouse and cottage 54.22886°N 0.65316°W | — | Late 18th century | The farmhouse and attached cottage are in sandstone with a pantile roof. There are two storeys, the house has three bays, and the cottage has two. Most of the windows are sashes with painted lintels. | II |
| Limekilns; 54.23654°N 0.64563°W | — | c. 1800 | A bank of four limekilns in limestone, the interior lined with red brick and the flues in cream brick. They are set into a wall about 10 metres (33 ft) high, each opening is round-arched, with raised voussoirs, and a raised impost band, over which is a raised band and a coped parapet. The kilns are tunnel-vaulted with segmental-arched flues at the rear in a surround of voussoirs and quoins. | II |
| Cornmill; 54.23249°N 0.65392°W | | Early 19th century | The former cornmill is in sandstone, with quoins and a slate roof. There are three storeys and four bays, and a single-storey office extension projecting in the second bay. In the third bay is a full-height gabled weatherboarded lucam. The left bay contains a former millstone chamber opening with a round arch, voussoirs and a keystone. | II |
| Sawmill Cottage; 54.23558°N 0.65675°W | | c. 1840 | The house is in sandstone with tooled quoins and a pantile roof. There are two storeys and three bays and a single-storey rear wing under a catslide roof. The central doorway has a fanlight, all the windows are sashes, and all the openings have painted lintels. | II |
