= Pickering railway station =

Heritage railway station in North Yorkshire, England

Pickering
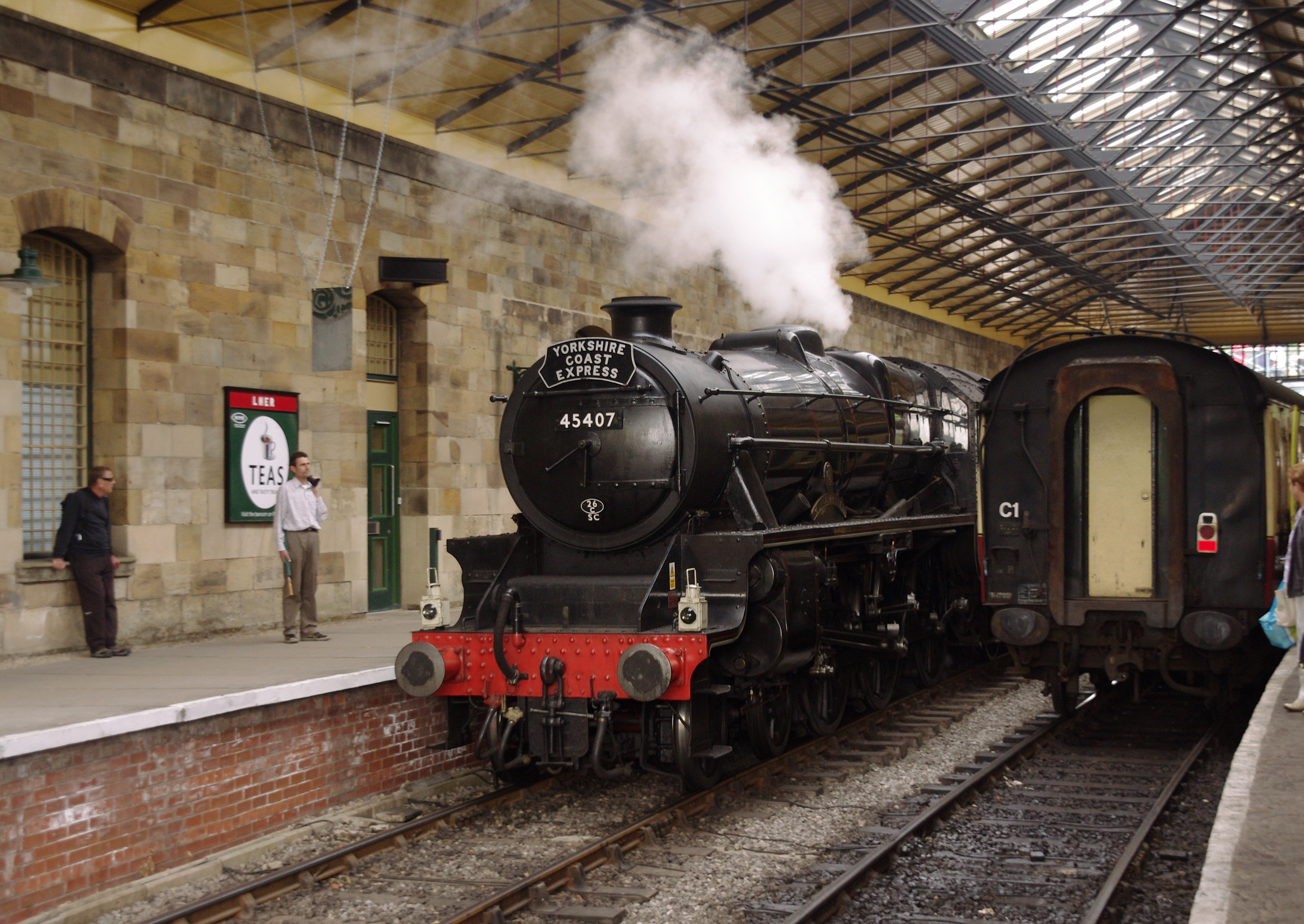
- LMS Stanier Class 5 4-6-0 45407 runs round a train at Pickering.

General information
- Location: Pickering, North Yorkshire; England
- Coordinates: 54.247068°N 0.778509°W
- Grid reference: SE796841
- System: Station on heritage railway
- Manager: North Yorkshire Moors Railway
- Platforms: 2

Construction
- Architect: George Townsend Andrews
- Architectural style: Italianate

History
- Original company: York & North Midland Railway
- Pre-grouping: North Eastern Railway
- Post-grouping: London & North Eastern Railway

Key dates
- 25 June 1836: W&P terminus opened
- 1846: Y&NM through station opened
- 6 March 1965: Station closed
- 24 May 1975: Station re-opened

Listed Building – Grade II
- Feature: Pickering Railway Station
- Designated: 27 November 1975
- Reference no.: 1241474
Location

Pickering railway station is the southern terminus of the North Yorkshire Moors Railway and serves the town of Pickering in North Yorkshire, England. The first railway arrived in Pickering from the north in 1836, however, it wasn't until the railway was connected from the south in 1845, that the current station was built. The station was closed by British Railways in March 1965, but since 1975, the station has served as the southern terminus of the North York Moors Railway.

The main building of the station, including the station house and retaining walls, is a grade II listed building.

== History ==
=== Whitby and Pickering Railway (1836 to 1845) ===
Originally, from 1836, Pickering was the southern terminus of the horse worked Whitby and Pickering Railway (W&P) engineered by George Stephenson. The coach shed at the end of the W&P's line stood approximately where the north end of the Y&NM trainshed stands today. The W&P minute books (in The National Archives) also refer to a weighbridge at Pickering but if built its location is unknown.

=== York and North Midland Railway (1845 to 1854) ===
In 1845 the W&P was taken over by George Hudson's York and North Midland Railway (Y&NM) and the present station was built (to the design of George Townsend Andrews, opening in 1846. The Y&NM converted the line into a double track steam railway and constructed the link from Pickering to Rillington Junction on the new line from York to Scarborough.

As well as the fine station building the York and North Midland Railway also provided other characteristic Andrews buildings, a stone built goods shed with wooden extension and a gas works - one of the earliest surviving railway gasworks buildings - occupied the area now known as 'the Ropery'. The Y&NM also built a small brick single-road engine shed, large enough for a single locomotive, the shed was extended by the NER in 1867, retaining the same style (they even dismantled and re-erected the end section of the original building, according to the original contract plans held in the NYMR archives). There was a standard Y&NM house built adjacent to the shed.

The Y&NM also provided a number of (mainly single storey) gatekeepers cottages next to those road crossings away from the town centre (Haygate Lane, Mill Lane and Newbridge (2 storey)), all of which still survive.

=== North Eastern Railway (1854 to 1922) ===
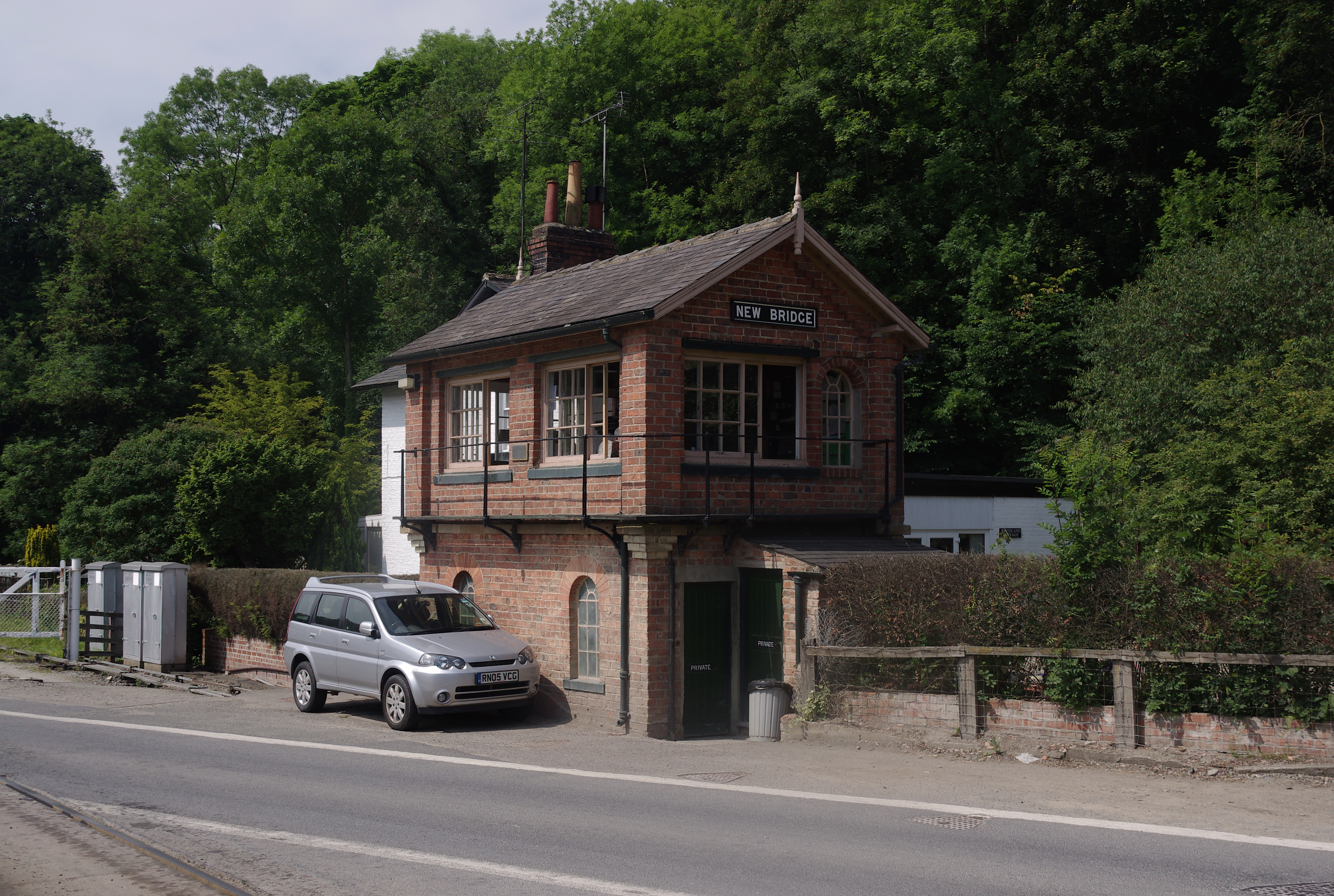
Points at the station are controlled by New Bridge signal box, which also controls the level crossing in the foreground.

The North Eastern Railway (NER) made various changes at Pickering, they raised the platforms from almost track level to about the present level, in so doing they had to provide two steps down into every room in the station office block. They also extended the platforms beyond the limits of the Y&NM trainshed.

In 1875, the Gilling and Pickering line opened, connecting Pickering to Kirkbymoorside, Helmsley and Thirsk. In 1882, the Forge Valley line opened, connecting Pickering to Scarborough via Thornton-le-Dale. Both these lines entered Pickering from the south, joining together up with the line from Rillington Junction at Mill Lane Junction.

Block-signalling was introduced in 1876. Signal cabins (the NER name) were erected at Mill Lane, Hungate, Bridge Street, High Mill and Newbridge. On the branches to Kirkbymoorside and Thornton-le-Dale, small signal cabins were opened to control the single to double track junctions, these were Eastgate and Goslip Bridge. Of these seven cabins only Newbridge survives today, which was grade II listed in 1975.

Originally there was a small turntable behind the engine shed but it became too small and inconvenient and was replaced by a 50-foot (15 m) turntable north of the station near High Mill signal cabin. The NER also erected a standard cast-iron panelled tank on a brick base (similar to the one at Goathland) at the south end of the sidings immediately north of the station. This tank was filled by a pump and pump house between the north end of the Y&NM trainshed and Pickering Beck, from which water was taken. The tank served three standard NER water columns, on the up and down main lines and on the turntable road, as well as supplying water to the engine shed.

=== London and North Eastern Railway (1923 to 1947) ===
Very little changed at Pickering during the London and North Eastern Railway's (LNER) twenty-five year reign. A new paint scheme, two tone green and cream replaced the NER's brown and cream but most of the NER's characteristic enamel signs remained in use, although the Running in boards were painted over during the Second World War. Although the LNER brought different locomotives, most of the local trains still consisted mainly of NER stock.

=== British Railways (1948 to 1966) ===
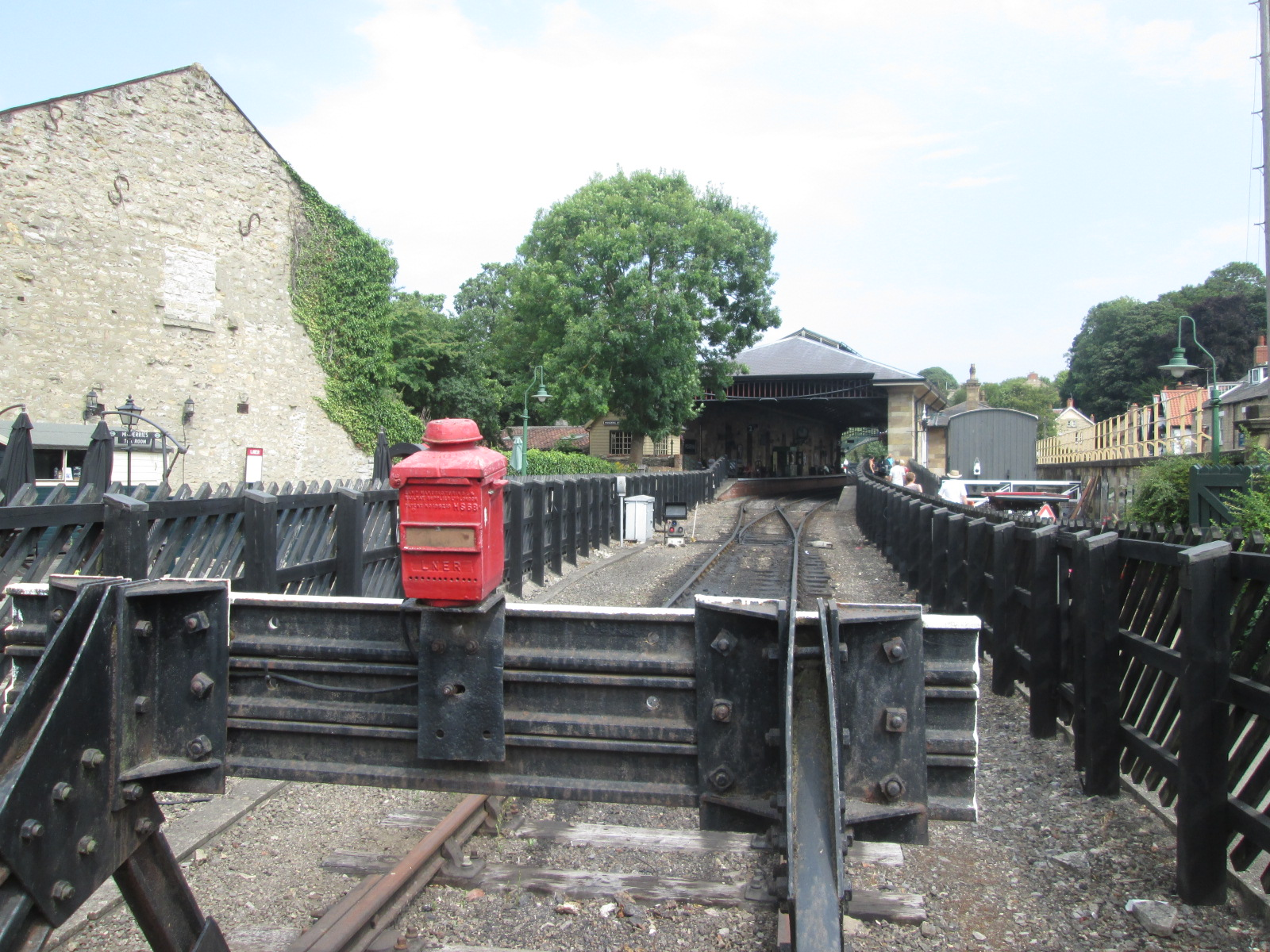
The end of the line in 2018 with the train shed beyond; until 1966 this line continued to Rillington Junction

Under British Railways (BR) the present station lost its characteristic overall roof in 1952 as an economy measure as corrosion meant it was unsafe. At some time in the early BR period (probably at the same time that the overall roof was removed), Pickering lost its characteristic small W.H.Smiths bookstall on the up platform. This bookstall had been there since some time in the NER period, it appears in the background of views taken by local photographer Sidney Smith before and during the first World War, subjects include a local Sunday School outing. It also appears in a photo of a wedding group on the platform in early BR days, a copy of which is held in the NYMR Archives digital image collection.

Railway closures started in 1950, with the closure of the line to Thornton-le-Dale, and in 1953, with the closure of the line to Kirkbymoorside. The engine shed closed in 1958 and Pickering's engine requirements were supplied by Malton shed. The turntable was also removed (by then there were no terminating passenger services, both branch lines having closed).

Pickering station was proposed to close in the Beeching Report of 1963 which planned the closure of all railways serving Whitby. Despite a fierce local campaign of opposition the line between Rillington Junction and Grosmont closed for passengers on 8 March 1965. The line from Rillington as far as New Bridge signal box (about a mile north of the station) remained open for goods for a further year, a solitary signalman being retained at Pickering to work all the cabins needed by the goods trains.

=== Preservation ===
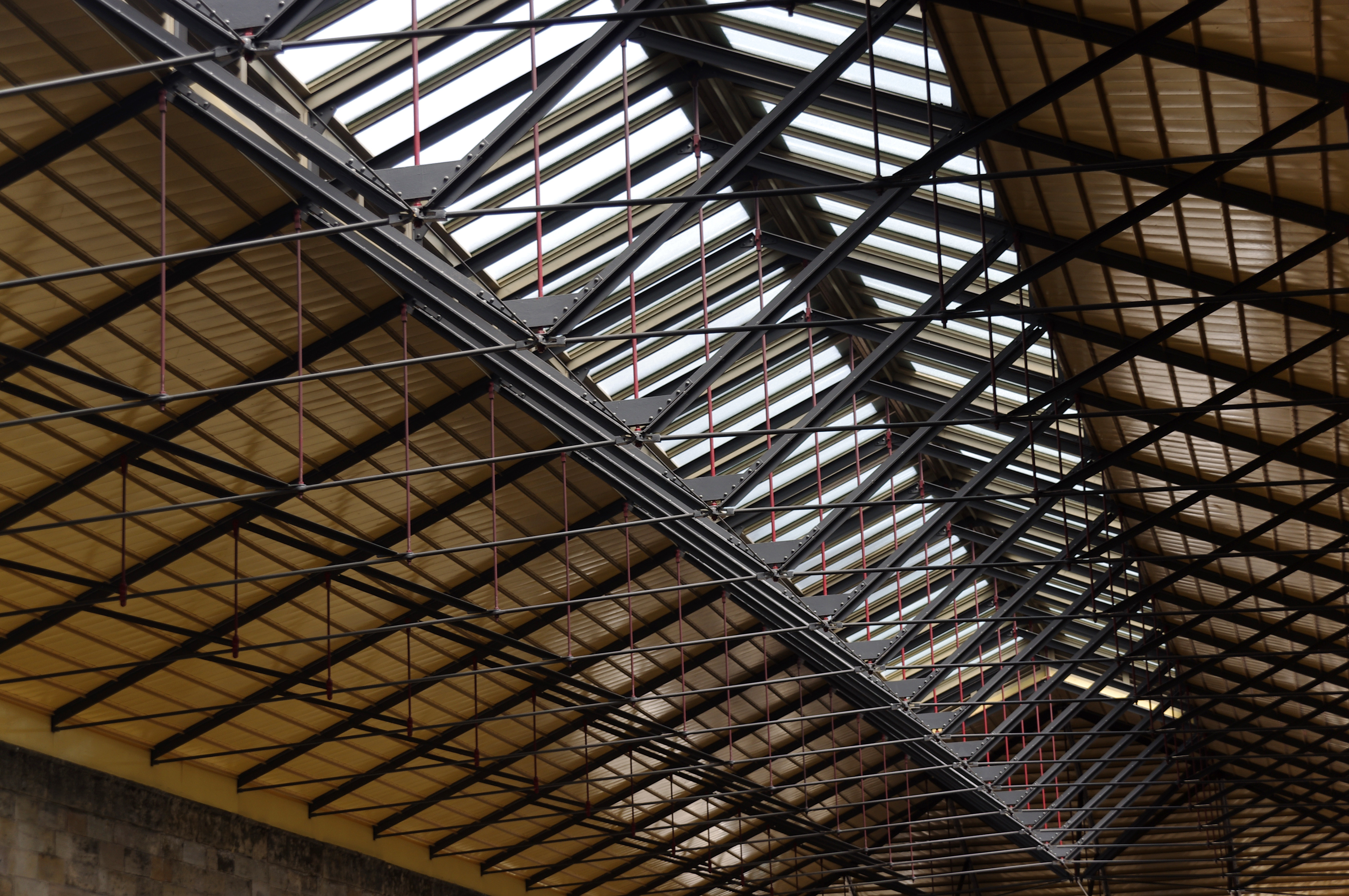
A roof was added to the station in 2011.

In 1967, a group of local residents set up the North Yorkshire Moors Railway Society with the aim of preserving the line. Services began in 1970, and on 22 April 1973 the entire line from Grosmont to Pickering was reopened. Initially, due to a dispute with the local council, the railway terminated at a single wooden platform adjacent to High Mill, north of the station. The stone built Andrews station was re-opened to traffic in May 1975.

The preserved railway was granted funding from the Heritage Lottery Fund for a number of schemes at Pickering station, which included reinstatement of the 1845 designed roof. This cost £556,000 and was projected to be complete by 2010, but was not officially unveiled until April 2011.

In 2022, a new five-track carriage shed, known as the Carriage Stable and featuring a cantilevered roof, was opened at Trout Farm on the northern approach to Pickering station. This will accommodate up to 40 of the railway’s heritage carriages, and enable servicing and cleaning tasks to be completed undercover.

== Layout ==
Outside view

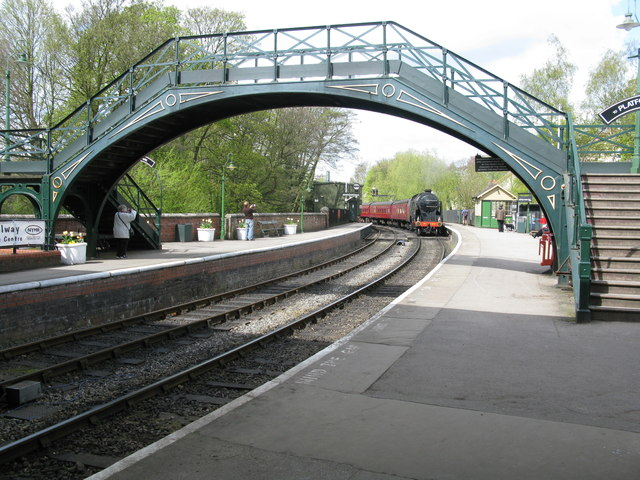
The footbridge from under the train shed

Since 1975, Pickering station has been a terminus, with trains arriving and departing to the north only. This mirrors the situation between 1836 and 1846, albeit with the station located a little further north than at present. However between 1846 and 1966 Pickering was not a terminus; the main line continued south to Rillington Junction and thus to Malton, with connections for York. Just south of the town was a double junction (at Mill Lane) with the Gilling and Pickering Line turning west for Kirbymoorside, Helmsley, Gilling and eventually Pilmoor on the East Coast Main Line, whilst the Forge Valley branch turned east for Thornton-le-Dale and Scarborough.

The station itself still has the layout it had as a through station, with two platforms flanking twin tracks, spanned by the restored train shed. The two tracks converge to a short headshunt to the south, and to the single running line to the north. The original main station building is beside platform 1 (the eastern platform) and contains the main entrance, ticket office, tea rooms and gift shop. The entrance from the car park is on platform 2, and buildings there include the visitor centre and learning centre. Both platforms have accessible entrances and accessible toilets. The two platforms are connected by an accessible walkway around the headshunt, and a stepped footbridge.

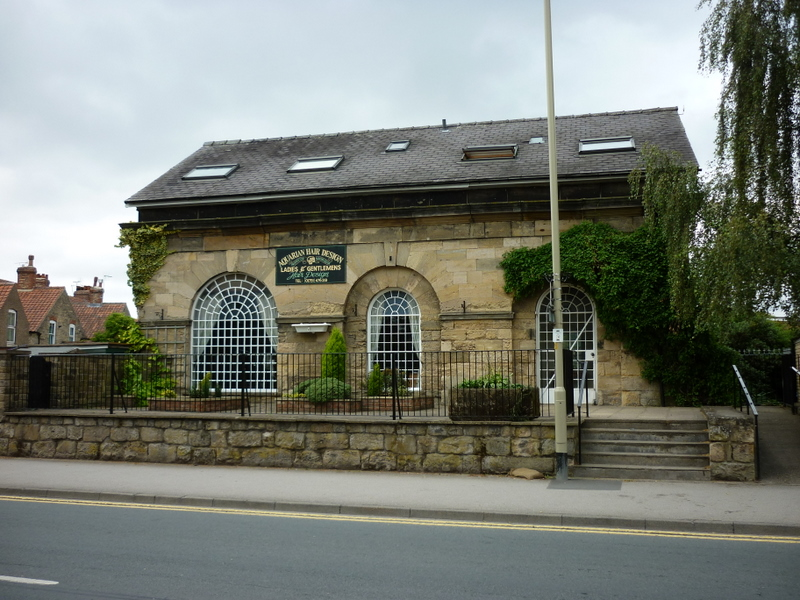
The former station gas works

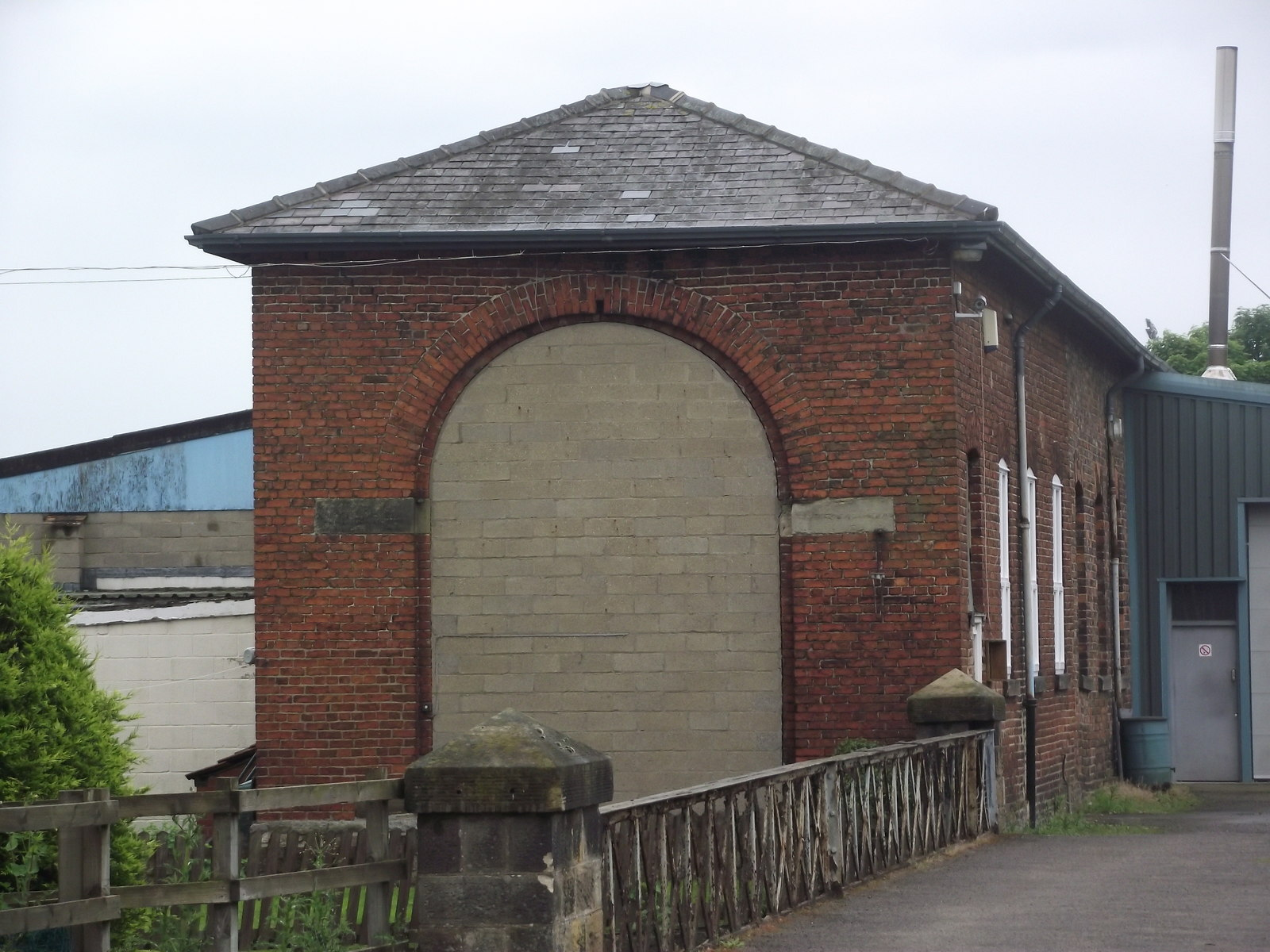
The former engine shed

The route of the abandoned railway to the south beyond the headshunt is now partly occupied by a road called The Ropery. The goods shed was demolished to make way for the new road but the gas works retort and purifier house still stands today adjacent to the new road. It ceased to produce gas when the town got its own gas supply, and was subsequently used as a corn warehouse, a tyre retailers, a café, and is now a ladies hairdressers. The former engine shed and adjoining house, which were located on the south side of the A170, have been converted into commercial premises and incorporated into a joinery works. Despite having lost its clerestory roof at some stage, this building is a rare (if not the only) surviving example of a G. T. Andrews engine shed, and one of very few rural single track engine sheds still standing.

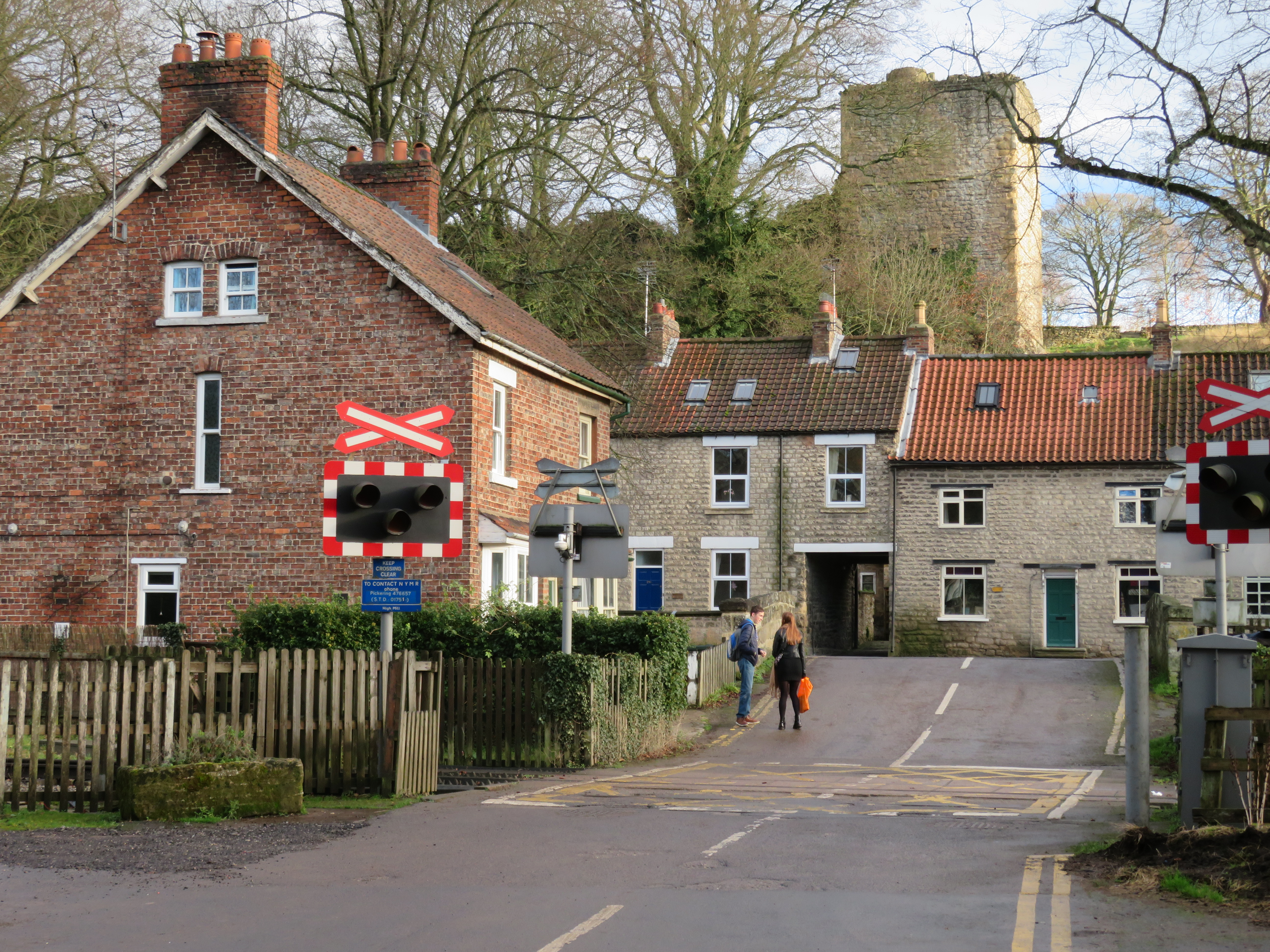
High Mill level crossing

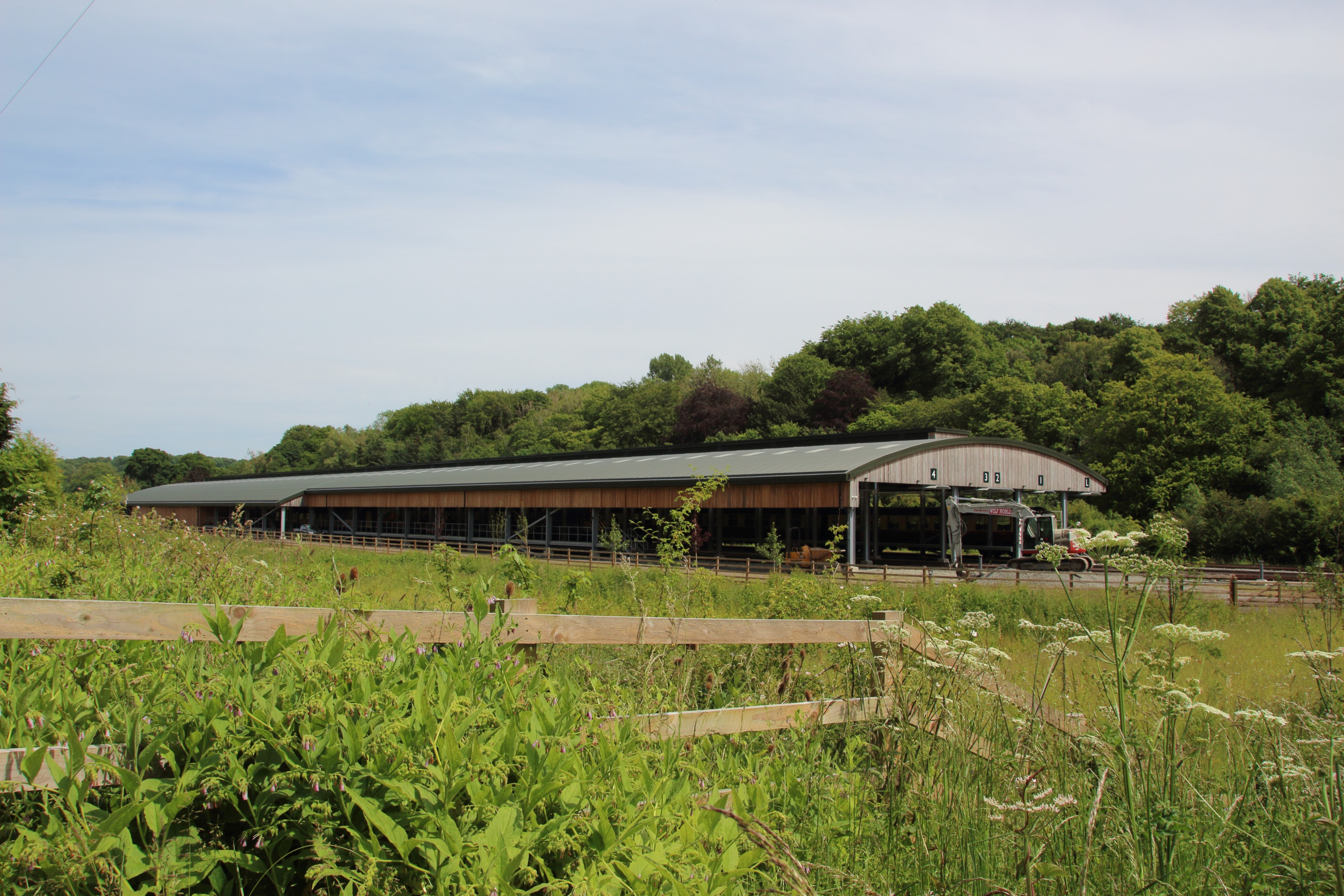
The new Trout Farm carriage shed

Immediately to the north of Pickering station, the North Yorkshire Moors Railway's carriage & wagon works, and a 60-foot (18 m) turntable, are situated to the west of the running line and adjacent to the station car park. The line then crosses the High Mill level crossing, under the walls of Pickering Castle. About 820 yards (750 m) further north is the new carriage shed at Trout Farm, whilst New Bridge is another 550 yards (500 m) further north. New Bridge is the home of the signal box which controls the southern section of the line, and the line's civil engineering depot and sidings. Beyond New Bridge, the line continues to Levisham station, some 5.6 miles (9 km) north of Pickering.

== Services ==
The North Yorkshire Moors Railway runs regular services from Pickering to Grosmont, and since 2007, some summer extensions to Whitby, operated by a variety of steam and diesel traction.

| Preceding station | Heritage railways | Following station |
|---|---|---|
| Terminus | North Yorkshire Moors Railway | Levisham towards Whitby |
Disused railways
| Thornton Dale | Forge Valley Line | Terminus |
| Kirby | Y & NMR (Pickering Branch) | Terminus |
| Sinnington | Gilling and Pickering Line | Terminus |

The nearest current mainline railway station is Malton, 8 miles (13 km) away. Yorkshire Coastliner operates bus route 840, linking Pickering with Whitby to the north and Malton, York and Leeds to the south. East Yorkshire's route 128 connects Pickering with Helmsley to the west and Scarborough to the east. Additional services between Pickering and Scarborough are provided by East Yorkshire’s route X3. Viscount Travel’s route X28 also links the town with Malton and Scarborough.

== See also ==
- Listed buildings in Pickering, North Yorkshire

== Bibliography ==
- Addeyman, John F (2020). Addeyman, John F (ed.). North eastern Railway Engine Sheds. North Eastern Railway Association. ISBN 978-1-911360-26-1.
- Bairstow, Martin (1996). Railways around Whitby. Vol. 2. Halifax: Bairstow. ISBN 1-871944-13-9.
- Bairstow, Martin (2008). Railways Around Whitby. Vol. 1. Farsley: Bairstow. ISBN 978-1-871944-34-1.
- Belcher, Henry. Illustrations of the scenery on the line of the Whitby and Pickering Railway in the north eastern part of Yorkshire. East Ardsley: EP Publishing. ISBN 0-7158-1164-9.
- Chapman, Stephen (2008). York to Scarborough, Whitby & Ryedale. Todmorden: Bellcode Books. ISBN 9781871233193.
- Ellis, Norman (1995). North Yorkshire Railway Stations. Ochiltree: Stenlake. ISBN 1-872074-63-4.
- Fawcett, Bill (2011). George Townsend Andrews of York : 'The railway architect'. York: North Eastern Railway Association. ISBN 978-1-873513-76-7.
- Hoole, Ken (1972). North Eastern Locomotive Sheds. Newton Abbot: David & Charles. ISBN 0-7153-5323-3.
- Hoole, Ken (1974). A regional history of the railways of Great Britain; Volume 4 – the North East. David & Charles. ISBN 0 7153 6439 1.
- Hoole, Ken (1983). Railways of the North York Moors : a pictorial history. Clapham: Dalesman Books. ISBN 0852067313.
- Potter, G. W. J. (1969). A History of the Whitby and Pickering. SR Publishing. ISBN 0-85409-553-5.
- Suggitt, Gordon (2005). Lost railways of North and East Yorkshire. Newbury: Countryside Books. ISBN 978-1-85306-918-5.
- Suggitt, Gordon (2010). Lost Railways of North & East Yorkshire. Lost Railways. Newbury: Countryside Books. ISBN 9781853069185.
- Tomlinson, W. W. (1914). North Eastern Railway, Its Rise and Development. Newcastle-upon-Tyne: A. Reid & Company (1914); Newton Abbot: David & Charles (1967).
- Vanns, Michael (2017). "Early Days to Best Years". The North Yorkshire Moors Railway (1 ed.). Barnsley: Pen & Sword. ISBN 9781473892088.
- Young, Alan (2015). Lost Stations of Yorkshire; The North and East Ridings (1 ed.). Kettering: Silver Link. ISBN 978-1-85794-453-2.
