= Sawdon =

Village in North Yorkshire, England

Coordinates: 54.250599°N 0.553414°W

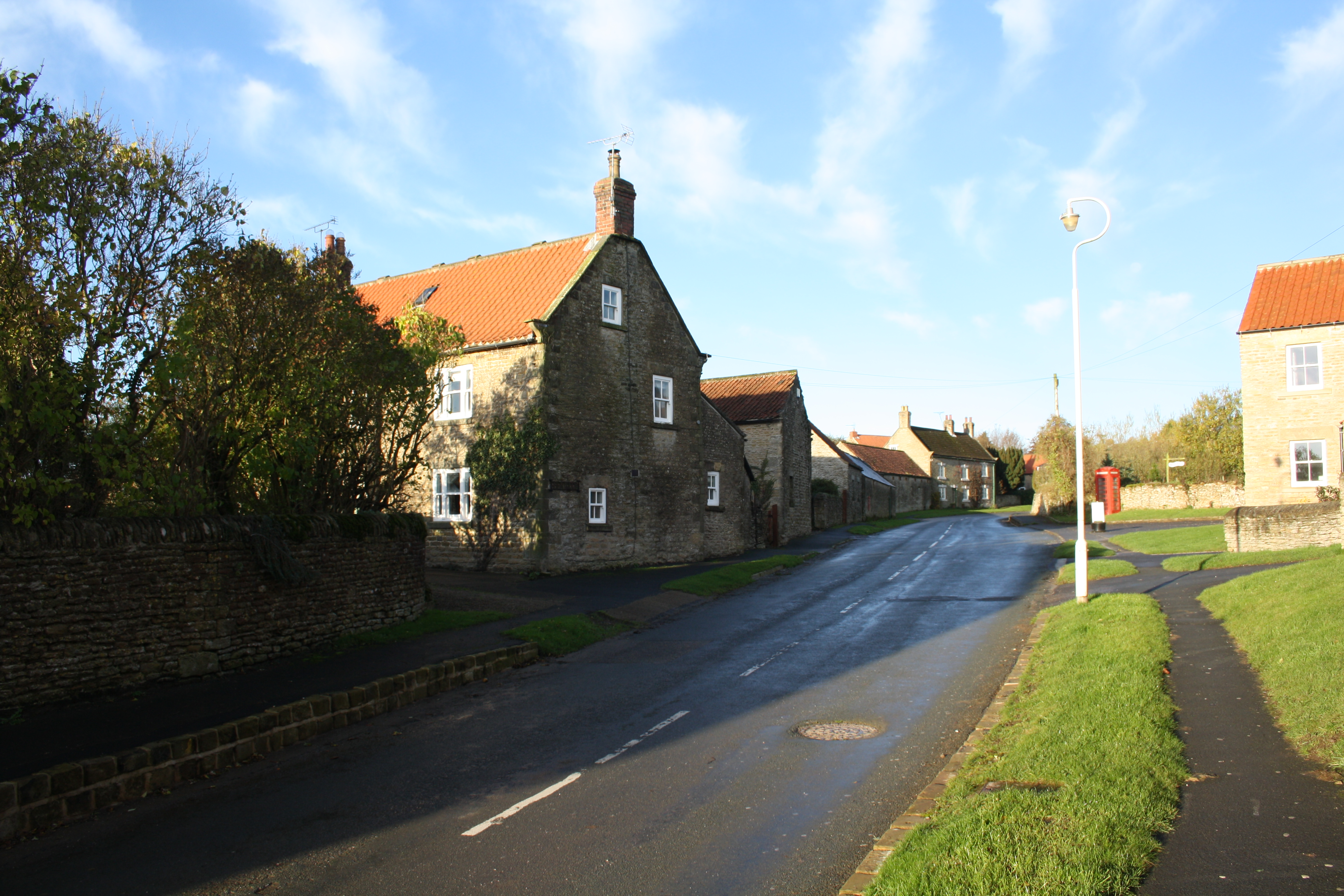
- Main street through Sawdon

- Location within North Yorkshire
- OS grid reference: SE943848
- Civil parish: Brompton
- Unitary authority: North Yorkshire
- Ceremonial county: North Yorkshire
- Region: Yorkshire and the Humber
- Country: England
- Sovereign state: United Kingdom
- Post town: SCARBOROUGH
- Postcode district: YO13
- Police: North Yorkshire
- Fire: North Yorkshire
- Ambulance: Yorkshire
- UK Parliament: Scarborough and Whitby

Sawdon is a village in the civil parish of Brompton, in North Yorkshire, England, about 8 miles (13 km) west of Scarborough.

The village lies 1.75 miles (3 km) north of Brompton, which is on the A170 road connecting Pickering with Scarborough. It lies at the northern edge of the Vale of Pickering with Hackness Forest and the North York Moors National Park directly to the north of the village.

Sawdon was formerly a township in the parish of Brompton, in 1866 Sawdon became a separate civil parish, on 25 March 1886 the parish was abolished and merged with Brompton. In 1881 the parish had a population of 167. From 1974 to 2023 it was part of the Borough of Scarborough, it is now administered by the unitary North Yorkshire Council.

Whilst the village is not mentioned specifically by name in the Domesday Book, its name is recorded as far back as 1290 as Saldene, which means Sallow Valley. However, the manor of Sawdon was included in the Domesday survey for the area in and around Brompton. No churches were built in the village, but in 1823, a Wesleyan chapel was erected on the main road through the settlement. This is now a private dwelling.

From 2012 Sawdon Village Hall was selected as the site for fundraising events by the charity Astronomy Wise. These events see a large gathering of astronomers and visitors at the building throughout the year. Regular meetings usually take place on the second Friday of every month excluding the summer months.

== See also ==
- Listed buildings in Brompton, east North Yorkshire
- Sawdon railway station
