= Wykeham railway station =

Disused railway station in North Yorkshire, England

Wykeham
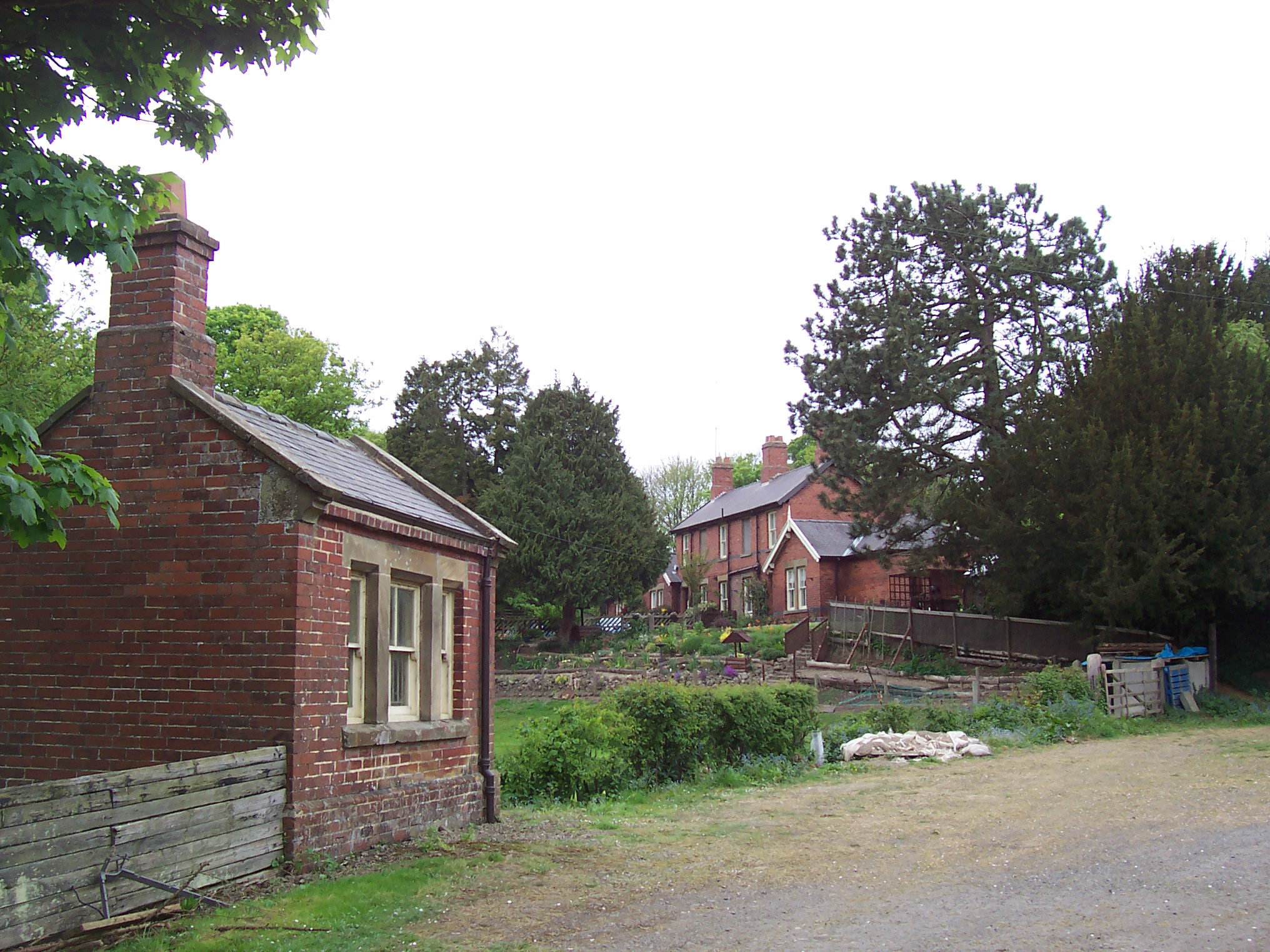
- The former station at Wykeham

General information
- Location: Wykeham, North Yorkshire; England
- Coordinates: 54.238400°N 0.518395°W
- Grid reference: SE966835
- Platforms: 1

Other information
- Status: Disused

History
- Original company: North Eastern Railway
- Pre-grouping: North Eastern Railway
- Post-grouping: London and North Eastern Railway

Key dates
- 1882: opened
- 1950: closed
Location

Wykeham railway station was situated on the North Eastern Railway's Pickering to Seamer branch line. It served the villages of Wykeham and Ruston in North Yorkshire, England. The station opened to passenger traffic on 1 May 1882, and closed on 5 June 1950.

Preceding station	Disused railways	Following station
Forge Valley	Forge Valley Line	Sawdon
