= Listed buildings in Brompton, east North Yorkshire =

Brompton is a civil parish in the county of North Yorkshire, England. It contains 35 listed buildings that are recorded in the National Heritage List for England. Of these, one is listed at Grade I, the highest of the three grades, and the others are at Grade II, the lowest grade. The parish contains the villages of Brompton-by-Sawdon and Sawdon, and the surrounding countryside. Most of the listed buildings are houses, cottages, and associated structures, farmhouses and farm buildings. The other listed buildings consist of a church, a cemetery chapel, a school and a war memorial.

== Key ==
| Grade | Criteria |
|---|---|
| I | Buildings of exceptional interest, sometimes considered to be internationally important |
| II | Buildings of national importance and special interest |

== Buildings ==
| Name and location | Photograph | Date | Notes | Grade |
|---|---|---|---|---|
| All Saints' Church; 54.22622°N 0.55516°W | | 14th century | The church has been altered and extended through the centuries, the oldest part being the west tower, with the porch added in 1895. It is built in sandstone with a slate roof, and consists of a nave, north and south aisles, a south porch, a chancel with a north chapel, and a west steeple. The steeple has a tower with three stages, large diagonal buttresses, a northeast stair turret, and bell openings with ogee-headed lights and pointed hood moulds. On the tower is an octagonal broach spire with lucarnes and a weathervane. There are embattled parapets on the porch, the aisles and the chapel, and in the nave and south wall of the chancel are three-light Perpendicular windows. The walls of the church contain re-set Norman fragments. | I |
| Dovecote, Low Hall; 54.22283°N 0.56059°W | — | 16th century (probable) | The dovecote, to the northwest of Low Hall, is in limestone on a chamfered plinth, with quoins, a moulded string course, and a stone flag roof with crow-stepped gables. There is a rectangular plan, and it contains a low round-arched doorway, and a chamfered mullioned window with a landing platform in the left gable end. In the centre of the roof ridge is an entrance box with a landing platform. Inside, there are L-shaped nesting boxes. | II |
| Low Hall; 54.22250°N 0.56003°W | — | 17th century | The former manor house, which has been altered and extended, is in sandstone on a plinth, with quoins, and roofs of stone flags and pantile with coped gables and kneelers. There is a front of five bays, the middle bay with two storeys, flanked by cross wings with two storeys and attics. The middle bay has a moulded eaves cornice, and a raking cornice to a pediment. It contains a doorway with a Gibbs surround and a triple keystone, above which is a sash window with a triple keystone; the other windows are sashes with keystones. At the rear is a round-arched stair window with Gothic glazing and imposts. | II |
| Manor House; 54.22740°N 0.55178°W | — | Early 18th century | The house is in limestone with a pantile roof. There are two storeys, three bays, and a rear service extension. On the front are a doorway, two casement windows and a horizontally-sliding sash window, and in the upper floor are sash windows. Inside the house is an inglenook fireplace. | II |
| Rye Topping Farmhouse; 54.21250°N 0.54929°W | — | Early 18th century | The farmhouse is in limestone, with quoins, and a roof of stone flags at the front and Roman tile at the rear, with rudimentary kneelers. There are two storeys and an L-shaped plan, with a front range of three bays, and two low storeys at the rear. The doorway has a divided fanlight. The windows have roughly quoined surrounds, and they are sashes, those in the upper floor horizontally-sliding, and all the openings have lintels with tripartite keystones. | II |
| Brompton Hall School; 54.22698°N 0.55538°W | | Mid 18th century | A country house incorporating parts of an earlier house, at one time the home of Sir George Cayley, later converted into a school. It is in sandstone on a plinth, with chamfered quoins, floor bands, a projecting eaves cornice and a parapet. There are three storeys and the entrance front has four bays and a Tuscan portico. On the garden front are seven bays, the middle three bays projecting. The windows are sashes with projecting surrounds and keystones. | II |
| Garden House, Brompton Hall; 54.22713°N 0.55460°W | — | Mid 18th century | The building, which was used as a workshop by Sir George Cayley, is in limestone, with quoins, sandstone dressings, a moulded eaves band, and a slate roof. There is a single storey and a single pedimented bay. The central doorway is approached by steps, and has a moulded surround, a pulvinated frieze and a cornice, above which is a panel. On the right return is a commemorative plaque, and on the inner face of the left jamb of the doorway is an inscription and the depiction of an airship. | II |
| Keepers Cottage; 54.22327°N 0.55443°W | | Mid 18th century | The house is in sandstone with boxed eaves and a pantile roof. There are two storeys and three bays, and a parallel rear range. The doorway is in the centre, the windows are sashes, and all the openings have bordered herringbone-tooled lintels. | II |
| Ha-ha, Low Hall; 54.22206°N 0.56007°W | — | 18th century | The ha-ha to the south of the hall is in sandstone. It consists of a sunken wall about 0.5 metres (1 ft 8 in) high and about 50 metres (160 ft) long. | II |
| Outbuildings west of Low Hall; 54.22272°N 0.56103°W | — | 18th century | The outbuildings consist of a coach house, stables and a cart-shed, byres and a barn, arranged round three sides of a yard. They are in sandstone with quoins, stepped eaves, and pantile roofs with coped gables and kneelers. In the centre is a barn with two storeys and three bays, to its left is a range with a single storey and lofts and four bays, and to the right is a single-storey range. The barn has a doorway with a flat arch, and at the rear is a segmental arch with a keystone. The coach house range has doors, and a segmental carriage arch with a quoined surround and a keystone, over which is a pitching window with a keystone. | II |
| Stable block west of Low Hall; 54.22246°N 0.56077°W | — | Mid 18th century | The stable block is in sandstone on a plinth, and has a pantile roof with coped gables and shaped kneelers. There is a single storey and three bays, and a recessed two-bay outbuilding on the left. The main block has a central doorway with a Gibbs surround and a divided fanlight, flanked by sash windows with triple keystones. The outbuilding contains doorways, horizontally-sliding sash windows, in the right gable end is a pivoted window, and all the openings have lintels with tripartite keystones. | II |
| Low Hall Farmhouse and outbuilding 54.22411°N 0.55424°W | — | Mid to late 18th century | The farmhouse is in sandstone, with quoins, a stepped eaves course, and a pantile roof with coped gables and shaped kneelers. There are two storeys, four bays, and two rear service wings. The central doorway and the windows, which are sashes, have painted tooled lintels and keystones. To the left is a single-storey outbuilding with quoins. At the rear are four cart arches infilled with stable doors and pig troughs, and at the end is a byre. | II |
| Yew Cottage; 54.22649°N 0.55018°W | — | Mid to late 18th century | The cottage is in sandstone with a stepped eaves course and a pantile roof. There are two low storeys and two bays. On the front is a doorway, and the windows are horizontally-sliding sashes. The ground floor openings have bordered herringbone-tooled lintels. | II |
| 5 Church Lane; 54.22608°N 0.55358°W | | Late 18th century | A house in sandstone, with a brick outshut, and a pantile roof with a coped gable and a shaped kneeler on the right. There are two storeys and three bays. In the centre is a doorway with a fanlight, above which is a sash window. The other windows are horizontally-sliding sashes with tripartite lintels and keystones. | II |
| 2 Hungate; 54.22715°N 0.55044°W | | Late 18th century | A pair of cottages, later combined, in sandstone with a pantile roof. There are two storeys and two bays. On the front is a doorway and a blocked doorway, and the windows are horizontally-sliding sashes. The ground floor openings have painted tooled wedge lintels. | II |
| 3 Hungate; 54.22703°N 0.55038°W | | Late 18th century | A sandstone cottage with a pantile roof, two storeys and two bays. In the centre is a doorway, and the windows are sashes. The ground floor openings have painted tooled wedge lintels, and in the upper floor are thin timber lintels. | II |
| 4 Hungate; 54.22694°N 0.55035°W | | Late 18th century | A sandstone cottage with a pantile roof. The main block has two storeys and two bays, to the right is a lower bay, and further to the right is an even lower extension. The doorway is in the lower bay, and the windows are horizontally-sliding sashes. The windows in the ground floor of the main block have painted tooled wedge lintels, and in the upper floor they have thin timber lintels. | II |
| 1 and 2 West End; 54.22608°N 0.55784°W | | Late 18th century | A house with a cottage (Foxglove Cottage) to the right, both with two storeys, and pantile roofs with coped gables and shaped kneelers. The house has two bays in variegated brick, and a lower single bay to the left in sandstone with quoins. The central doorway has a divided fanlight, and the windows are horizontally-sliding sashes, the ground floor openings with wedge lintels. The cottage is also lower, with a single bay, a trellis porch, with a sash window to the right, and a horizontally-sliding sash window above. The house has a rear outshut with a catslide roof, and behind the cottage is an extension. | II |
| Brentwood; 54.25196°N 0.55546°W | — | Late 18th century | The house is in sandstone, with quoins, a stepped eaves course, and a pantile roof with coped and quoined gables and shaped kneelers. There are two storeys and three bays and an outshut. The doorway is in the centre, above which is a sash window. The other windows are tripartite sashes. All the openings have stone sills, tripartite lintels and keystones. | II |
| Old Farmhouse and outbuilding 54.25222°N 0.55671°W | — | Late 18th century | The farmhouse is in sandstone, with quoins, stepped eaves course, and a pantile roof with stone coped gables and kneelers. There are two storeys and three bays. The doorway has a divided fanlight, the windows are horizontally-sliding sashes, and all the openings have painted lintels with tripartite keystones. The outbuilding to the left has a single storey and there are no openings facing the street. | II |
| Rose Cottage; 54.22681°N 0.55030°W | — | Late 18th century | The house is in sandstone, with a stepped eaves course, and a pantile roof with coped gables and shaped kneelers. There are two storeys, two bays, and a continuous outshut. The doorway has a divided fanlight, to its left are two sash windows, and the upper floor contains two horizontally-sliding sashes. | II |
| Brick kiln, Manor House; 54.22253°N 0.55319°W | — | Early 19th century | The brick kiln, in the grounds of the Manor House, is in sandstone lined with red brick. At each end is a segmental-arched opening, and it has a tunnel-vaulted interior. | II |
| Dale House; 54.25106°N 0.55313°W | — | Early 19th century | The front and left side of the house are in red brick, the right side is sandstone, it has a sandstone plinth and a slate roof, and the outshut is in sandstone with a pantile roof. There are two storeys and three bays, and a single-bay extension on the right. The central doorway has a fanlight with Gothic glazing, and the windows are sashes. The openings have painted wedge lintels. | II |
| Green Farmhouse; 54.22911°N 0.54989°W | — | Early 19th century | The farmhouse, which was extended in about 1955, is in red brick, the original roof is in pantile, and the extension roof is slated. There are two storeys, the original block has three bays, the extension has two bays, and at the rear is an outshut with a catslide roof. The central doorway has a divided fanlight and a bracketed cornice hood. The windows are sashes, those in the ground floor are tripartite, and all have wedge lintels. | II |
| Gate piers 30 metres southeast of Low Hall; 54.22205°N 0.55952°W | — | Early 19th century | The gate piers are in sandstone with a rectangular plan, and are about 3 metres (9.8 ft) high. Each pier is on a low plinth, and has shallow pilasters and a raised impost band. Above is a frieze with volutes and rosettes, an overhanging cornice, and a flat top with urn finials. | II |
| Gate piers 50 metres southeast of Low Hall; 54.22202°N 0.55924°W | — | Early 19th century | The gate piers are in sandstone with a rectangular plan, and are about 3.25 metres (10.7 ft) high. Each pier is on a low plinth, and has shallow pilasters and a raised impost band. Above is a frieze with volutes and rosettes, an overhanging cornice, and a flat top with urn finials. | II |
| Manor Farmhouse; 54.25249°N 0.55591°W | — | Early 19th century | The farmhouse is in sandstone, with quoins, and a pantile roof with coped gables, and a shaped kneeler on the left. There are two storeys and two bays, and a two-storey three-bay service wing to the right. The central doorway has a divided fanlight, and the windows are sashes. The ground floor openings have painted wedge lintels, and those in the upper floor have thin timber lintels. | II |
| Farm buildings, Manor Farm; 54.25250°N 0.55512°W | — | Early 19th century | The farm buildings consist of cartsheds, byres and a workshop. They are in sandstone, the cartsheds have brick piers, and they all have pantile roofs. The buildings form three ranges around a courtyard, and are in a single storey, apart from a cartshed with a loft. In the byre and workshop are stable doors, at the rear of the cartshed are three segmental-arched openings, and in the gable end are two pitching holes. | II |
| Grove Farmhouse; 54.25162°N 0.55390°W | — | Early to mid 19th century | The farmhouse is in red and cream brick on a sandstone plinth, with a timber eaves cornice and a hipped pantile roof. There are two storeys and three bays. In the centre is a full-height recessed round arch containing a doorway with a bracketed cornice hood, and above it is a sash window with a segmental lintel. The outer bays contain sash windows with wedge lintels. In the right return are two full-height recessed round arches with sash windows, those in the ground floor with wedge lintels, and in the upper floor with segmental lintels. | II |
| Dale Lodge; 54.22740°N 0.55450°W | — | c. 1840 | The house is in sandstone on a chamfered plinth, with sill bands, a timber eaves band and cornice, overhanging eaves on shaped brackets, and a hipped slate roof. There are two storeys and three bays, and a single-storey single-bay extension on the right. Steps lead up to the central doorway that has a divided fanlight and a bracketed cornice hood. The windows are sashes, those in the outer bays in full-height recesses. At the rear is a staircase window. | II |
| Gate piers, Brompton Hall; 54.22709°N 0.55520°W | — | 19th century | The gate piers at the entrance to the drive are in sandstone on plinths, and are about 3 metres (9.8 ft) high. They have vermiculated long and short quoins forming bands of rustication. At impost level on each pier is a band of Greek key moulding, under a frieze carved with swags, a cornice and a flat cap. | II |
| Gate piers, Brompton Hall Park; 54.22774°N 0.55532°W | — | 19th century | The gate piers at the entrance to the former park are in sandstone on plinths, and are about 3 metres (9.8 ft) high. They have vermiculated long and short quoins forming bands of rustication. At impost level on each pier is a band of Greek key moulding, under a frieze carved with swags, a cornice and a flat cap. | II |
| Gates and railings, Dale Lodge; 54.22725°N 0.55437°W | — | Mid 19th century | The paired carriage gates, garden gate and railings are in cast iron. The railings are on a sandstone plinth, they are about 1.25 metres (4 ft 1 in) high, and have thistle head and urn finials. | II |
| Chapel of Rest; 54.22218°N 0.55066°W | | 1889 | The cemetery chapel, designed by Temple Moore, is in grey and yellow sandstone, with a slate roof on the body of the chapel and tile on the tower. It consists of a single unit, with a tower on the northeast corner, and an entrance in the east gable end. The doorway is arched, and has moulded voussoirs fading to plain chamfered jambs, above which is a Latin cross. The tower has a pyramidal roof with a metal cross finial, and a slit bell opening on each side. In the body of the church are lancet windows. | II |
| War memorial 54.22747°N 0.5511°W | | Early 1920s | The war memorial is in a memorial garden, and is in sandstone with a square plan. It consists of a Celtic wheel cross with knot-work decoration, on a tapering shaft containing a panel with a moulded design. This stands on a tapering pedestal on a plinth of three steps. On the pedestal is an inscription and the names of those lost in the First World War, and the names of those lost in the Second World Warr are on the top step of the plinth. | II |
