= St John's Church, Allerston =

Parish church in North Yorkshire, England

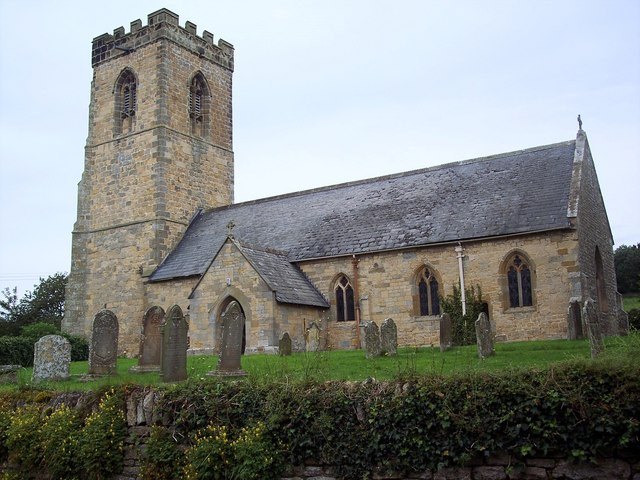
- St John's Church, Allerston
- St John's Church, Allerston
- 54°14′3.4″N 0°39′14.7″W
- OS grid reference: SE 87829 82912
- Location: Allerston, North Yorkshire
- Country: England
- Denomination: Church of England

History
- Dedication: John the Baptist

Architecture
- Heritage designation: Grade II* listed

St John's Church, Allerston is a Grade II* listed Parish church in Allerston, North Yorkshire, England.

The building dates back to the early 14th century, and became Grade II* listed on 10 January 1953.

== See also ==
- Listed buildings in Allerston
