= Thornton Dale railway station =

Disused railway station in North Yorkshire, England

Thornton Dale
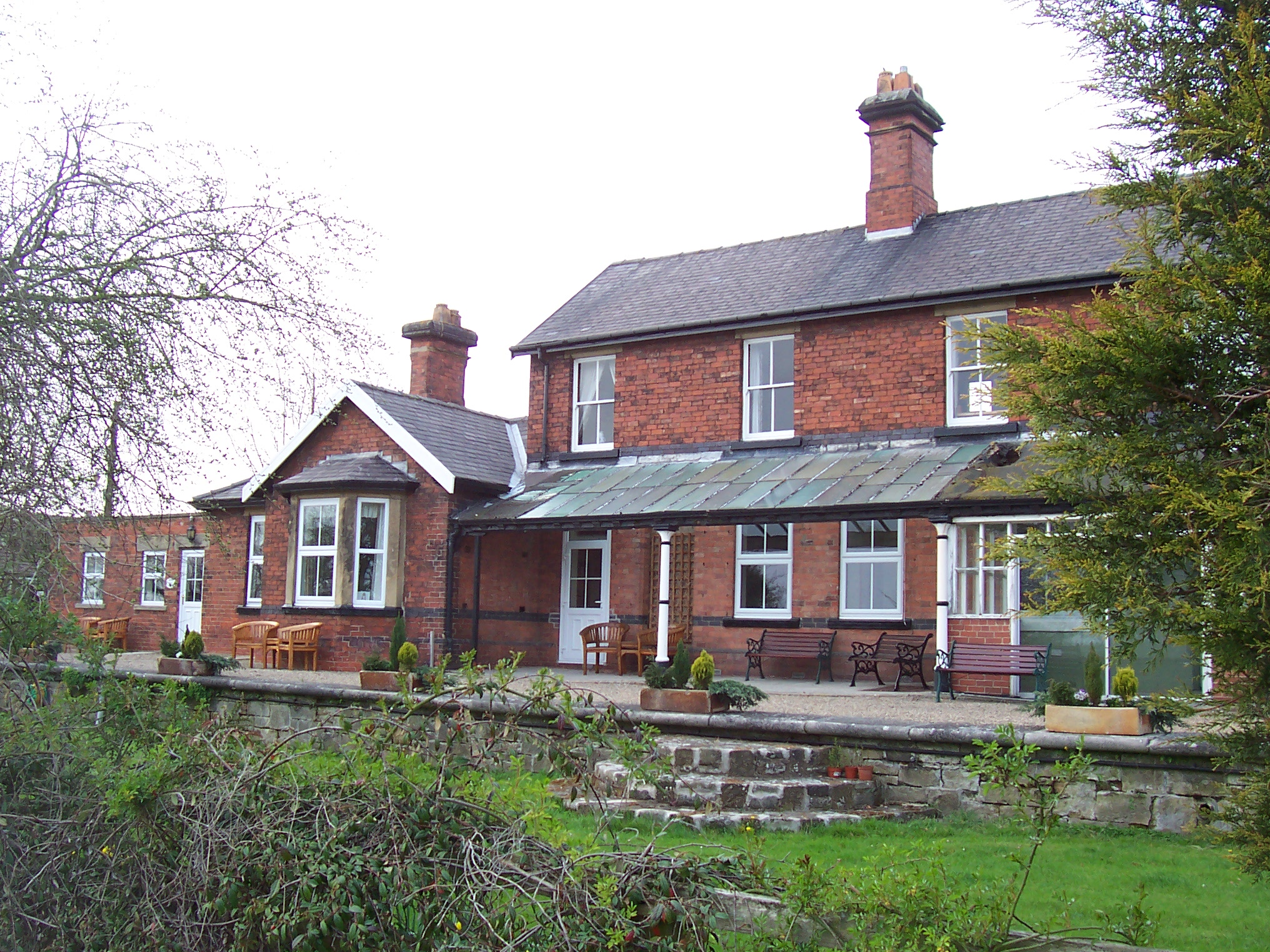
- Thornton Dale station in 2007

General information
- Location: Thornton-le-Dale, North Yorkshire; England
- Coordinates: 54.2284°N 0.7229°W
- Grid reference: SE833821
- Platforms: 1

Other information
- Status: Disused

History
- Original company: North Eastern Railway
- Pre-grouping: North Eastern Railway
- Post-grouping: London and North Eastern Railway

Key dates
- 1882: opened
- 1950: closed for passengers
- 1964: closed completely
Location

Thornton Dale railway station was situated on the North Eastern Railway's Pickering to Seamer branch line. It served the village of Thornton-le-Dale in North Yorkshire, England. The station opened to passenger traffic on 1 May 1882, and closed on 3 June 1950.

The trains first arrived in the village in 1839 but the Pickering-Scarborough branch was not completed here until 1882. After regular service began, some agricultural workers left the area on the train, seeking paid jobs elsewhere.

The station remained open for freight traffic to Pickering after the rest of the Forge Valley Line was closed and pulled up. A daily train took limestone (brought by lorry from a quarry north of the village) to Pickering from where it was taken forwards to Skinningrove Ironworks. Unfortunately the quarry company lost the contract to supply the ironworks and this traffic ceased by 1964. The last traffic into the station was two Presflo wagons of bulk cement for repairs to the village hall.

Shortly afterwards two Wickham Railmotors from Pickering visited the line to check that all the fences were stock-proof and in due course contractors arrived and removed the track.

The station building was cleared and converted into offices for a company building a (short lived) gas pipeline to Pickering. Subsequently, the property was used as a caravan park and the station was eventually converted into three holiday rental cottages.

| Preceding station | Disused railways | Following station |
|---|---|---|
| Ebberston | Forge Valley Line | Pickering |
