= Forge Valley railway station =

Disused railway station in North Yorkshire, England

Forge Valley
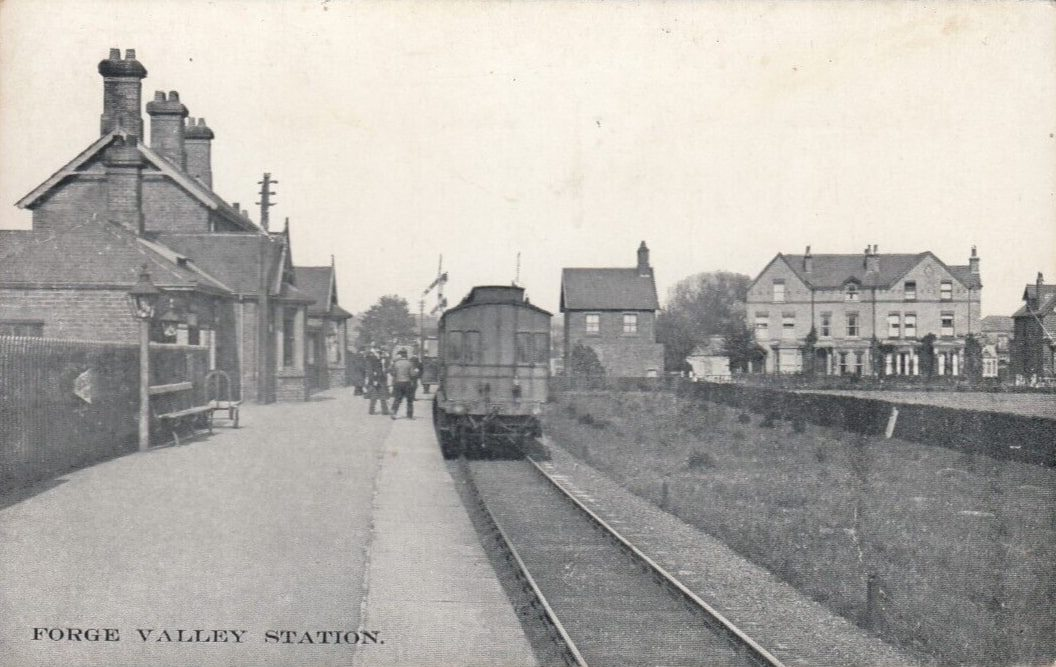

General information
- Location: East Ayton and West Ayton, North Yorkshire; England
- Coordinates: 54.246972°N 0.488620°W
- Grid reference: SE985845
- Platforms: 1

Other information
- Status: Disused

History
- Original company: North Eastern Railway
- Pre-grouping: North Eastern Railway
- Post-grouping: London and North Eastern Railway

Key dates
- 1882: Opened
- 1950: Closed
Location

Forge Valley railway station was situated on the North Eastern Railway's Pickering to Seamer branch line. It served the twin villages of East and West Ayton, and the local beauty spot Forge Valley.

== History ==
The station opened to passenger traffic on 1 May 1882.

The station's sidings and goods yard had a west-facing connection, and the station itself had only one platform. The goods yard was listed as being capable of handling livestock and horses, and was equipped with a crane which could lift weights up to 1-tonne (1.1-ton).

The station was host to a London and North Eastern Railway camping coach from 1935 to 1939.

It was closed on 3 June 1950, when the line closed to passenger traffic.

Preceding station	Disused railways	Following station
Seamer	Forge Valley Line	Wykeham

== The site today ==
The station building and surrounding site were later reused as a road and council highways depot by North Yorkshire County Council, while the former goods shed was used as a garage.

In 2024, proposals were submitted to redevelop the former railway site for housing while retaining parts of its railway heritage. The scheme was revised to provide 30 homes, including 20 for private sale and 10 affordable homes. The former station house would be converted into four apartments, while the former engine shed would be retained and converted for community use.
