= Snainton railway station =

Disused railway station in North Yorkshire, England

Snainton
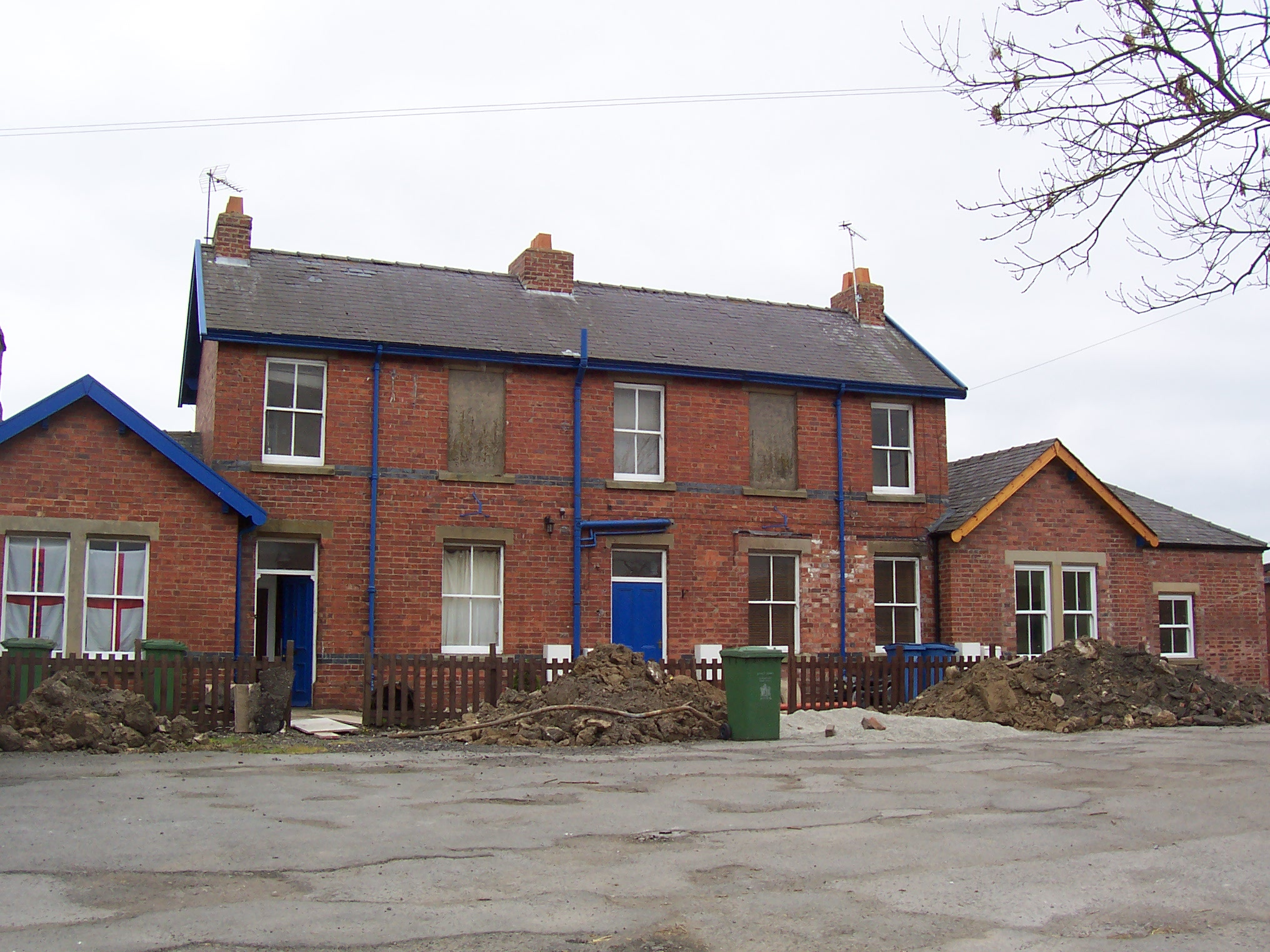
- The former station at Snainton

General information
- Location: Snainton, North Yorkshire; England
- Coordinates: 54.224219°N 0.591380°W
- Grid reference: SE919818
- Platforms: 2

Other information
- Status: Disused

History
- Original company: North Eastern Railway
- Pre-grouping: North Eastern Railway
- Post-grouping: London and North Eastern Railway

Key dates
- 1 May 1882: opened
- 3 June 1950: closed
Location

Snainton railway station was situated on the North Eastern Railway's Pickering to Seamer branch line. It served the village of Snainton, North Yorkshire, England. The station opened to passenger traffic on 1 May 1882, and closed on 3 June 1950. Snainton railway station has also been restored and is currently in single ownership.

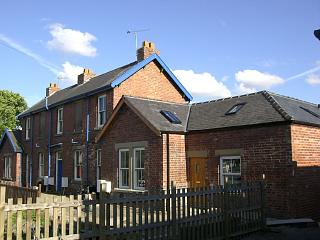
Another view of Snainton

Preceding station	Disused railways	Following station
Sawdon	Forge Valley Line	Ebberston
