= Listed buildings in Snainton =

Snainton is a civil parish in the county of North Yorkshire, England. It contains 32 listed buildings that are recorded in the National Heritage List for England. Of these, one is listed at Grade I, the highest of the three grades, and the others are at Grade II, the lowest grade. The parish contains the village of Snainton and the surrounding countryside. Most of the listed buildings are houses, cottages and associated structures, farmhouses and farm buildings. The others include a public house and associated structures, a mill and miller's house, and a church and its lychgate.

== Key ==
Grade	Criteria
I	Buildings of exceptional interest, sometimes considered to be internationally important
II	Buildings of national importance and special interest

== Buildings ==
Name and location	Photograph	Date	Notes	Grade
Foulbridge Farmhouse and cottage 54.20259°N 0.60037°W	—	13th century	This consists of a timber framed aisled hall, much of which has been retained. It was enclosed in the 18th century by a farmhouse and cottage. These are in brick and have a pantile roof with coped gables and shaped kneelers. The house has two storeys, a double depth plan, and three bays. On the front is a porch with chamfered posts and a cornice, and the windows are sashes, those in the ground floor with wedge lintels.	I
24 High Street; 54.22762°N 0.58693°W		Late 17th to early 18th century	The cottage is in sandstone with a thatched roof. There is a single storey and two bays, and an outshut. On the front are a doorway, a fire window, and two casement windows.	II
Garage east of Holm Farmhouse; 54.22703°N 0.59462°W	—	Early 18th century	A barn, later used for other purposes, it has a cruck frame, and is encased in limestone with a pantile roof. There is a single storey and five bays, and the gable end faces the street. It contains garage doors, a stable door and a blocked doorway. Inside, there are three truncated crucks.	II
Low Farmhouse; 54.22709°N 0.59746°W	—	Early 18th century	The farmhouse is cruck framed, it is encased in limestone, and has a pantile roof. There are two storeys, five bays, and a single-storey outbuilding on the left. On the front is a doorway and casement windows. Inside, substantial portions of two pairs of raised crucks are visible in the upper floor.	II
Oakwood; 54.22637°N 0.59097°W	—	Early 18th century	The house is cruck framed, it is encased in limestone, and has a pantile roof. There is one storey and attics, and five bays. In the centre is a gabled timber porch, there is a horizontally sliding sash window, and the other windows are 20th-century replacement casements. The attic has gabled half-dormers with bargeboards.	II
Merryweathers; 54.22696°N 0.59336°W	—	1730 (or 1736)	The house has a cruck frame, it is encased in sandstone, and has a pantile roof. There is one storey and an attic, and three bays. On the front are two doorways and a fire window, and the other windows are horizontally sliding sashes. On the attic are two raking dormers, and on a chimney stack is a datestone. Inside, one pair of saddle apex upper crucks is visible in the upper floor.	II
41–43 High Street; 54.22823°N 0.58908°W	—	1733	A row of three sandstone cottages with a slate roof and two storeys. Each cottage has a doorway, and the windows are mixed, with one casement window and one fixed light, and the others are horizontally sliding sashes. Above the middle doorway is an initialled datestone.	II
46 High Street; 54.22825°N 0.58960°W	—	1748	The house is in sandstone, with quoins, and a pantile roof with coped gables and shaped kneelers, one dated. There are two storeys and three bays, and a single-storey lean-to on the right. On the front are horizontally sliding sash windows, the middle window on the ground floor is blind, and all have wedge lintels. The entrance is at the rear.	II
45 High Street; 54.22822°N 0.58940°W	—	Mid-18th century	The house is in sandstone with quoins and a pantile roof. There are two storeys and two bays. The doorway is in the left bay, to its right is a fire window, and the other windows are horizontally sliding sashes.	II
62 and 63 High Street; 54.22843°N 0.58950°W	—	Mid-18th century	A pair of houses in sandstone, with a pantile roof, two storeys and four bays. Steps lead up to a doorway, above which is a two-light blocked window, and these are flanked by horizontally sliding sash windows. All these openings have raised surrounds with keystones. To the right are openings with thin timber lintels.	II
Cliff Farmhouse; 54.22841°N 0.59192°W		Mid-18th century	The farmhouse is in sandstone, with quoins, and a slate roof with coped gables and shaped kneelers. There are two storeys, three bays and an outshut. On the front is a gabled porch with scalloped bargeboards and a finial, and the windows are sashes.	II
The Old Hall; 54.22648°N 0.59419°W	—	Mid-18th century	The house, later divided into two, is in sandstone, with quoins, and a slate roof with coped gables and shaped kneelers, and it has an extension partly in brick with a pantile roof. The main block has two storeys and five bays, the end bays with a single storey, and projecting. The doorway has a keystone and a pedimented hood, and the windows are sashes. The extension has one storey and an attic, and an L-shaped plan, and it contains horizontally sliding sash windows.	II
Wydale Hall; 54.23716°N 0.5777219°W		18th century	A country house that was extended in 1877 and 1904, and later used for other purposes. It is in sandstone with quoins and slate roofs, and has an irregular plan. The garden front has three storeys and three bays, a two-storey projecting wing on the right, and a two-storey canted bay window. On the right is a loggia of Ionic columns, and the windows are sashes. The entrance front has two storeys and an Ionic portico.	II
52 High Street; 54.22837°N 0.59121°W	—	Mid to late 18th century	The house is in sandstone with a pantile roof. There are two storeys and two bays. The doorway is in the centre, and the windows are horizontally sliding sashes.	II
57 High Street; 54.22847°N 0.59043°W	—	Mid to late 18th century	The house is in sandstone with a pantile roof. There is a single storey and attics, and two bays. The central doorway is approached by steps, and is flanked by casement windows. On the attic are two flat-topped dormers with casements.	II
Prospect Farmhouse; 54.22761°N 0.58663°W	—	Mid to late 18th century	The farmhouse is in sandstone on a plinth, with quoins, a moulded eaves course, and a pantile roof with coped gables and shaped kneelers. The high end has two storeys and three bays, and the low end has one storey and an attic. All the original openings have lintels and keystones. On the right, a flight of steps leads up to a loft door.	II
86, 87, 88 and 89 High Street and outbuilding 54.22739°N 0.58454°W	—	Late 18th century	A pair of houses, later four dwellings, in sandstone with a slate roof. On the front are two doorways, horizontally sliding sash windows and modern replacements, all the openings with wedge lintels. The left return has three bays, the middle bay forming a full-height semicircular bay window, with a shaped parapet and a ball finial. The outbuilding has a bowed front, and a shaped parapet and a ball finial.	II
Cliff Grange; 54.22691°N 0.59374°W	—	Late 18th century	The house is in sandstone on a plinth, and has a slate roof with coped gables and shaped kneelers. There are three storeys, three bays and a rear wing and outshut. The central doorway has shaped panelled jambs, a radial fanlight, and an open pediment on scrolled brackets. Above the doorway are sash windows with tripartite lintels. The outer bays contain three-storey canted bay windows. At the rear is a projecting bay with a stair window in a round arch.	II
Cockmoor Hall Farmhouse; 54.26577°N 0.60222°W		Late 18th century	The farmhouse is in brown sandstone, with quoins and a hipped pantile roof. There are two storeys, a double depth plan, a front of three bays, and a rear wing. The central doorway has a blocked fanlight, and a lintel with a tripartite keystone. The windows are small-paned casements.	II
Buildings northeast of Cockmoor Hall Farmhouse; 54.26603°N 0.60192°W		Late 18th century	The farm buildings are in sandstone, with quoins, and pantile roofs with coped gables and shaped kneelers, and they are arranged on three sides of a yard. The buildings include a threshing barn with a granary above, stables, byres, cart sheds and a carriage shed.	II
Cottage and workshop 54.22748°N 0.58611°W	—	Late 18th century	Two cottages later used for other purposes, in sandstone, whitewashed on the front, with a pantile roof, and the gable end facing the street. There are two storeys and four bays. On the front are two doorways, some of the windows are horizontally sliding sashes, and the others are replacement casements.	II
Hill Crest, gate and railings 54.22845°N 0.5902311°W	—	Late 18th century	The house is in sandstone with a brick extension, a stepped eaves course, and a pantile roof with coped gables and shaped kneelers. There are two storeys and three bays. The central doorway has a fanlight, and a bracketed canopy porch. The windows are sashes with tripartite lintels. Enclosing the front garden are railings and a gate with turned standards, and urn and spearhead finials.	II
The Coachman Inn; 54.22872°N 0.59850°W		Late 18th century	The public house is in sandstone, it is rendered on the left side, and has a pantile roof, hipped on the right, and with a coped gable and kneelers on the left. There are three storeys and three bays, and a single-storey outbuilding on the left. The central doorway has a small-pane fanlight, the windows in the ground and middle floors are sashes with lintels and keystones, and in the top floor are horizontally sliding sashes with shaped lintels. On the extension is a canted bay window.	II
Former outbuildings, The Coachman Inn; 54.22874°N 0.59893°W	—	Late 18th century	A coach house, stables and workshops with lofts above, later used for other purposes. The buildings are in sandstone, and have a pantile roof with coped gables. There is a single storey and lofts, and eight bays, the middle two bays projecting and gabled. The range contains an elliptical coach arch of quoins and voussoirs, garage doors under elliptical arches, and loading doors.	II
Outbuildings north of The Old Hall; 54.22665°N 0.59440°W	—	Late 18th century	The outbuildings are in sandstone, with quoins, and a pantile roof with a coped gable and kneeler on the end facing the street. There is one storey and lofts, and the range contains a barn in the centre, flanked by byres and stables. The openings include doorways, an oval window, and pitching holes.	II
Grosvenor House; 54.22634°N 0.59149°W	—	Early 19th century	The house is in sandstone, with quoins, a stepped eaves course, and a pantile roof. There are two storeys, four bays, and a rear wing. The doorway has a divided fanlight and a flat bracketed porch, and the windows are sashes with wedge lintels.	II
Troutsdale Mill, Millers House and outbuildings 54.27407°N 0.59329°W	—	Early 19th century	The buildings are in sandstone with pantile roofs. The house has two storeys and three bays, and contains a central doorway and horizontally sliding sash windows. To the left, at right angles, is the mill with a single storey and an attic. It contains a doorway, a horizontally sliding sash window, a casement window, and a gabled dormer with bargeboards. At the rear is a small yard, with a byre, a cart shed and stables.	II
49 High Street; 54.22827°N 0.59832°W	—	Early to mid-19th century	The house is in sandstone, and has a pantile roof with coped gables and shaped kneelers. There are two storeys and an attic, and three bays. In the centre is a doorway with a plain surround and a bracketed hood, the windows are sashes, and in the attic are two gabled dormers.	II
Outbuilding northwest of The Old Hall; 54.22683°N 0.59463°W	—	Early to mid-19th century	A carriage shed and a stable with a loft, they are in sandstone with quoins and a pantile roof. There is one storey and a loft, and four bays. In the centre is an elliptical arch of voussoirs, and elsewhere are doorways and windows. On the right gable wall is a flight of stairs to a loft door, and under it is a doorway.	II
St Stephen's Church; 54.22893°N 0.59150°W		1836	The church is in sandstone on a chamfered plinth, with quoins, a moulded eaves cornice, and a slate roof with coped gables. It consists of a nave and a chancel in one unit, with a bellcote on the west gable. On the south front is an arched doorway with carved spandrels and a hood mould. To the right are four mullioned and transomed windows with three arched lights, and flat hood moulds.	II
Rosea; 54.22822°N 0.58928°W	—	Mid-19th century	The house is in sandstone, with quoins and a slate roof. There are two storeys and two bays. The doorway in the right bay has pilasters, a patterned fanlight and a cornice. The windows are sash windows with heavy lintels.	II
Lychgate, St Stephen's Church; 54.22855°N 0.59149°W		c. 1895	The lychgate at the entrance to the churchyard is in sandstone, with quoins, and a coped gabled tile roof surmounted by a cross. It contains a re-set round Norman arch from the original 12th-century chapel on the site. The arch has three orders with chevron and beakhead mouldings on renewed shafts with scalloped capitals.	II
