= Seamer railway station =

Railway station in North Yorkshire, England

Seamer
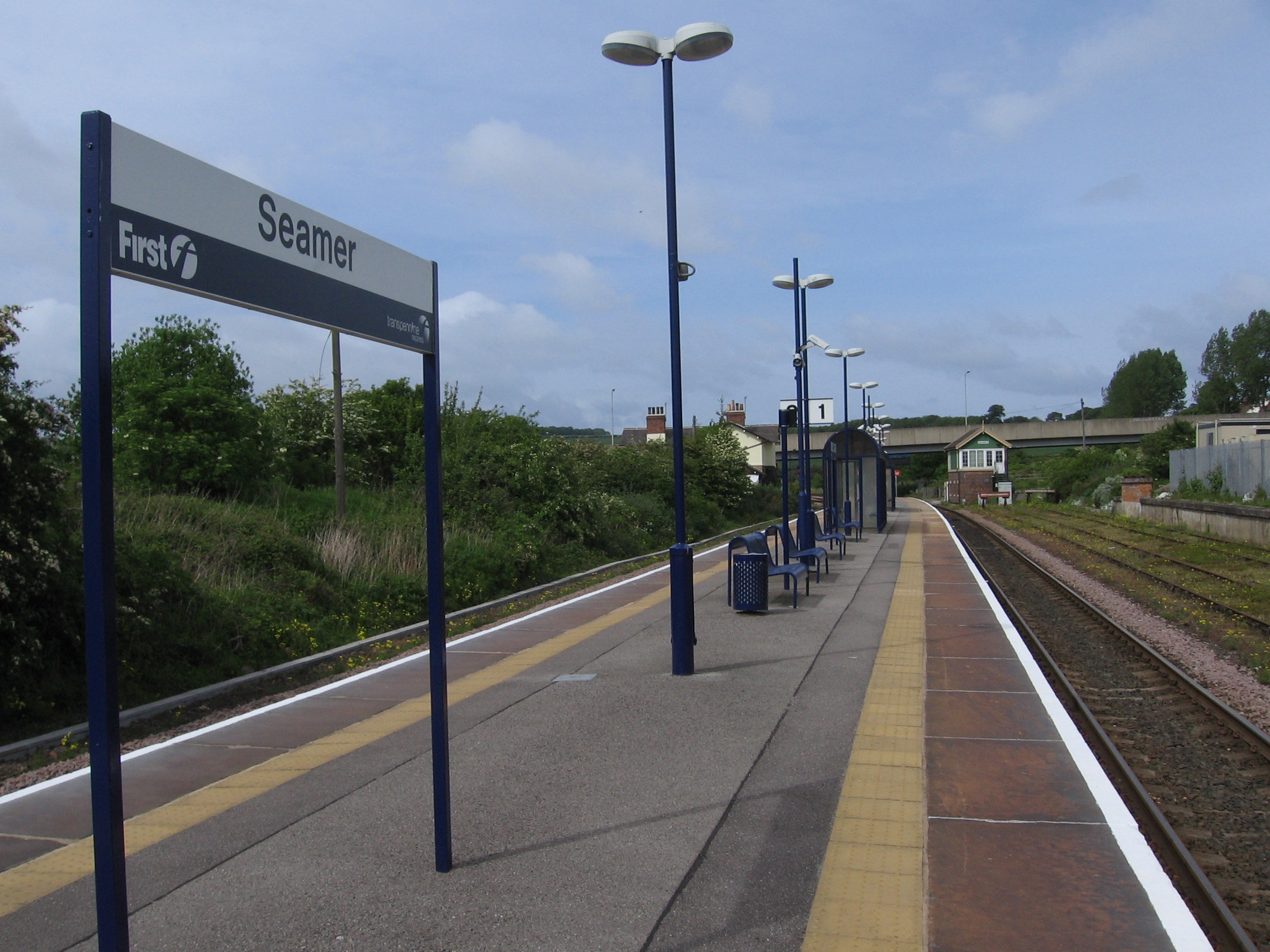
- The station, viewed from the platforms

General information
- Location: Seamer, North Yorkshire; England
- Coordinates: 54.2405°N 0.4171°W
- Grid reference: TA032839
- Managed by: TransPennine Express
- Platforms: 2

Other information
- Station code: SEM
- Classification: DfT category F2

History
- Opened: 1845

Passengers
- 2020/21: ▼34,528
- Interchange: 8,311
- 2021/22: ▲0.123 million
- Interchange: ▲32,493
- 2022/23: ▼0.121 million
- Interchange: ▲34,375
- 2023/24: ▲0.132 million
- Interchange: ▼28,811
- 2024/25: ▲0.164 million
- Interchange: ▲39,694
Location
Notes
- Passenger statistics from the Office of Rail and Road

Seamer railway station serves the village of Seamer in North Yorkshire, England. It lies near the end of the Scarborough branch on the TransPennine Express North TransPennine route, 39 miles (63 km) east of York at its junction with the northern end of the Yorkshire Coast Line. Seamer station is managed by TransPennine Express, with services being run by both Northern Trains and TransPennine Express.

The station is actually sited between the communities of Eastfield and Crossgates, about one mile from Seamer. It took the name of Seamer since there was already a Cross Gates railway station in West Yorkshire.

== History ==
Seamer station was opened on 7 July 1845 by the York and North Midland Railway and became a junction station when a branch line to Filey was opened the following year (5 October 1846). Its island platform configuration was chosen to make it easier for passengers to change between the two routes here rather than continuing into Scarborough to do so. A second branch line from the station (the Forge Valley Line to Pickering) was opened by the NER on 1 May 1882 - the station subsequently underwent improvements (including the construction of a second signal box and an additional passenger line & platform) in 1911 to accommodate the extra traffic.

The Forge Valley line was never particularly busy and it was an early victim of road competition, closing to passengers on 5 June 1950 (less than three years after the nationalisation of the railway system). The track was lifted by 1953 and the additional platform and slow line here was removed soon afterwards. The former station house on the down (eastern) side next to the level crossing (which has been pedestrian only since the late 1980s) still stands, though no longer in rail usage (now a private residence).

== Facilities ==
The station currently only has basic facilities, such as a large shelter on the island platforms, as well as passenger information screens towards the middle of the platforms. The station is unstaffed, but a ticket machine is provided. Step-free access to the platform is via a foot level crossing at the north end - this is supervised from the nearby signal box.

== Services ==
=== TransPennine Express ===
From Seamer Monday to Saturdays, there are up to two trains per hour eastbound to Scarborough and westbound generally an hourly TransPennine Express service to York, Leeds and Manchester Victoria. Through trains to Liverpool Lime Street had been reduced significantly following the COVID-19 pandemic and were finally withdrawn at the December 2022 timetable change.

On Sundays, the same service pattern applies.

=== Northern Trains ===
Northern Trains operates an hourly service to Bridlington and Hull on the Yorkshire Coast Line. These continue to Doncaster and Sheffield.

Until Northern Rail took over in 2004, Arriva Trains Northern did have services that stopped at Seamer, the current Blackpool to York service used to continue to Scarborough alongside TransPennine Express services. This service was usually worked by a Metro liveried Class 158 DMU, occasionally a Class 155 DMU. There was also a local service from York to Scarborough, usually worked by a Pacer DMU or a Class 156.

The new TransPennine & Northern franchises (which started in April 2016) was to see service frequency and rolling stock improvements implemented on both routes - the Hull line will have an hourly frequency throughout the week (now implemented), whilst the York line will have two trains per hour on weekdays (one Northern, one TPE) and an hourly service on Sundays. Trains to Liverpool will continue, but they will be diverted via Manchester Victoria and St Helens Junction. The change to TPE routing took effect in 2018, but Northern's plans for a York service are currently on hold due to a shortage of rolling stock.

== Route ==
Preceding station	National Rail	Following station
Malton	TransPennine Express North TransPennine	Scarborough
Filey	Northern Trains Yorkshire Coast Line	Scarborough
	Historical railways	
Terminus	Forge Valley line	Forge Valley
Ganton; Station closed; Line open	Y&NMR; York–Scarborough line	Scarborough Londesborough Road; Station closed; Line open
Cayton; Station closed; Line open	Y&NMR; Hull–Scarborough line	Scarborough Londesborough Road; Station closed; Line open
