= Forge Valley =

Nature reserve in North Yorkshire, England

Coordinates: 54.269914°N 0.489654°W

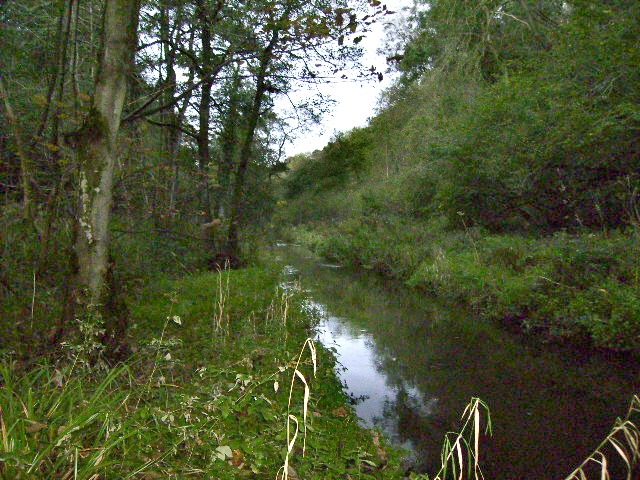
River Derwent in Forge Valley

Forge Valley is a national nature reserve in North Yorkshire, England, located within the North York Moors National Park on the East Ayton / Hackness road. The valley follows the route of the River Derwent and was formed by melting ice water at the end of the last ice age. The NNR at Forge Valley covers over 63 hectares (160 acres).

The area is now covered with woodlands which are thought to be 6,000 years old. Forge Valley takes its name from the fact that charcoal was produced in these woods, for use in iron forges. There was a foundry to the north of the valley in 1798.

Forge Valley is managed by Raincliffe Woods Community Enterprise CIC.

== See also ==
- Forge Valley railway station
