= Brompton by Sawdon =

Civil parish in North Yorkshire, England

Coordinates: 54.226°N 0.551°W

Brompton-by-Sawdon
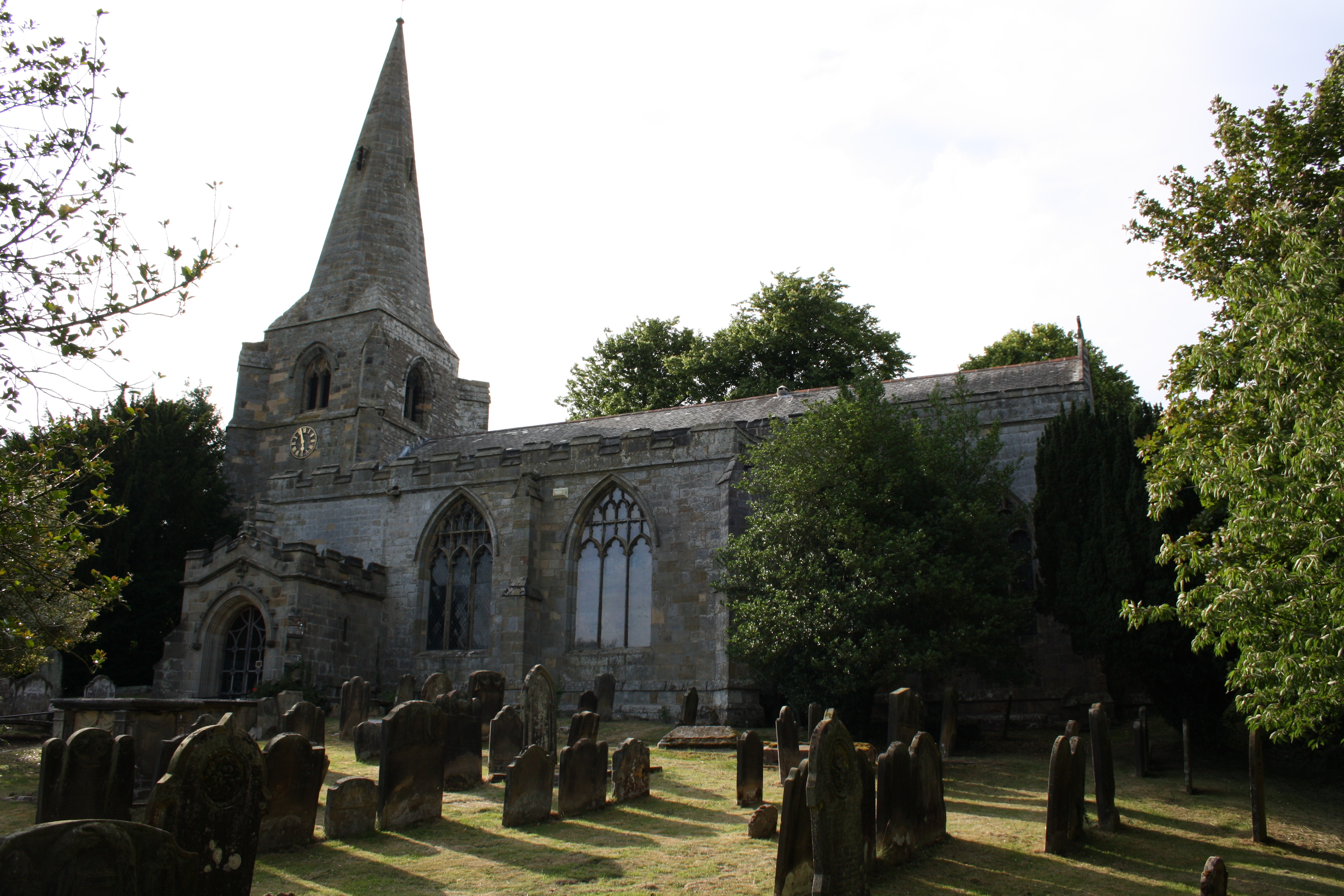
- All Saints' Church

- Location within North Yorkshire
- Population: 573 (2011 census)
- OS grid reference: SE945821
- Civil parish: Brompton
- Unitary authority: North Yorkshire
- Ceremonial county: North Yorkshire
- Region: Yorkshire and the Humber
- Country: England
- Sovereign state: United Kingdom
- Post town: SCARBOROUGH
- Postcode district: YO13
- Police: North Yorkshire
- Fire: North Yorkshire
- Ambulance: Yorkshire
- UK Parliament: Scarborough and Whitby

Brompton-by-Sawdon is a village in the Brompton civil parish of North Yorkshire district and county, England. The civil parish includes the village and the village of Sawdon.

The village of Brompton-by-Sawdon is about 8 miles (13 km) west of Scarborough, close to the North York Moors and on the A170 road. It lies on the northern edge of the Vale of Pickering, with the village of Sherburn 3 miles to the south. According to the 2011 UK census, Brompton parish had a population of 573, an increase on the 2001 UK census figure of 516. From 1974 to 2023 it was part of the Borough of Scarborough. It is now administered by the unitary North Yorkshire Council.

The name Brompton derives from the Old English brōmtūn meaning 'settlement growing with broom'.

Under 'Brompton', the sign on entry to the village reads 'The Birthplace Of Aviation' owing to the long-term residence of pioneering aeronautical engineer Sir George Cayley. Brompton has been the seat of the Cayley family since the Middle Ages, and Sir George Cayley was buried in the graveyard of All Saints' Church in 1857.

The poet William Wordsworth married Mary Hutchinson at All Saints' Church in the village, on 4 October 1802. A copy of the wedding certificate can be seen in All Saints Church.

Low Hall, off Barnard Lane, is the former manor house of the village; the current building dates from the 17th century and is Grade II listed.

Brompton Hall is a Georgian town house in the village centre, now a special school.

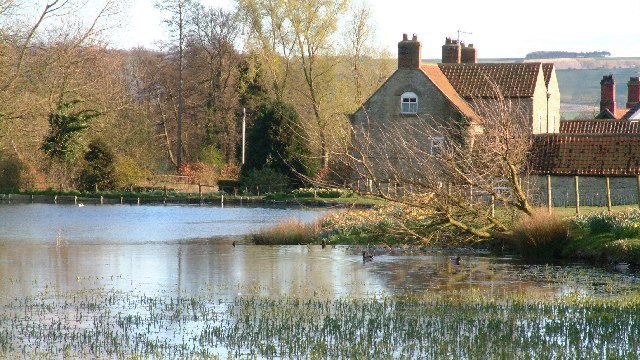
Brompton ponds

== See also ==
- Listed buildings in Brompton, east North Yorkshire
