= All Saints' Church, Brompton =

Parish church of Brompton in England

Coordinates: 54.2262°N 0.5552°W

- All Saints’ Church
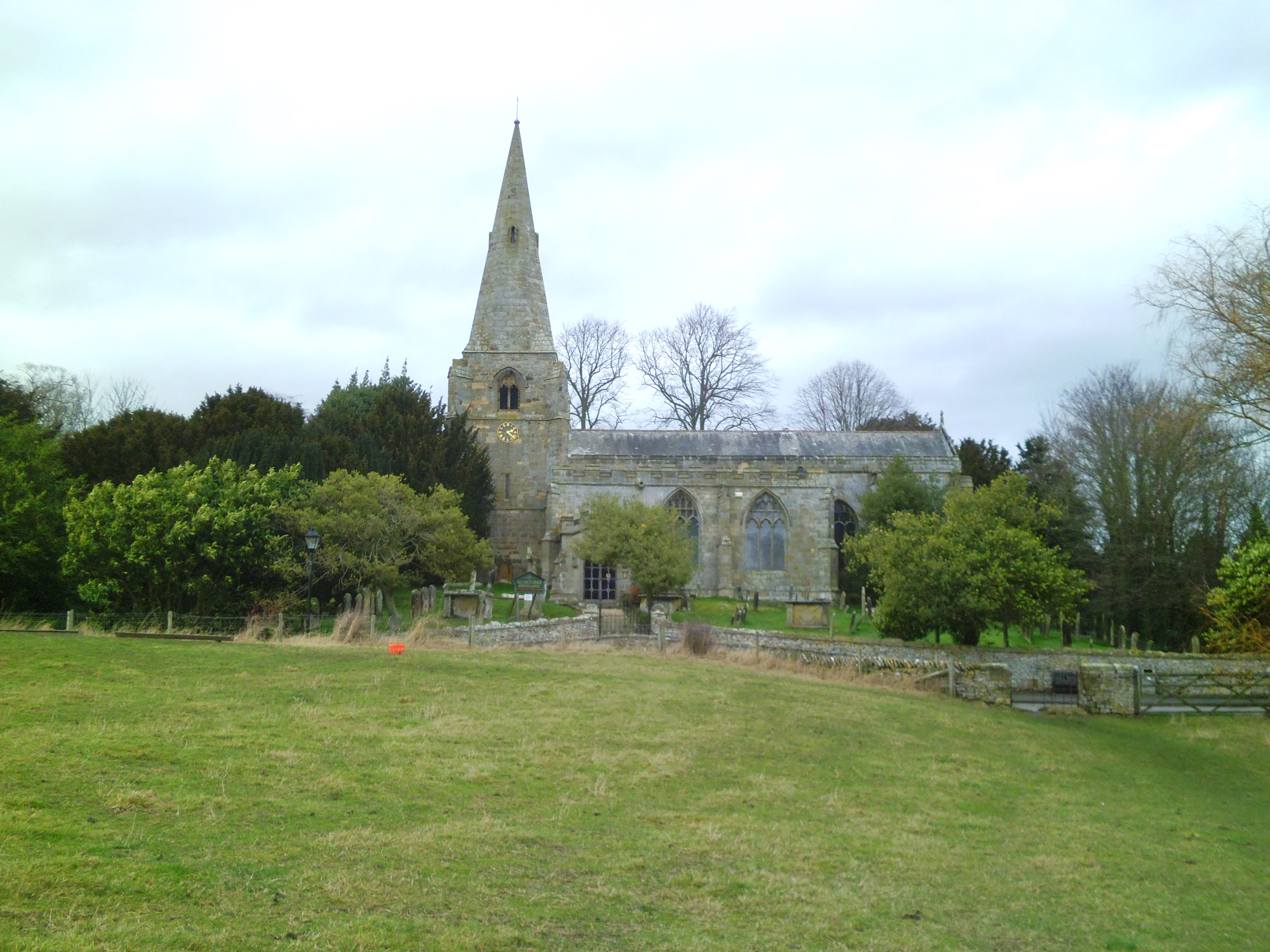
- Pictured in 2014
- All Saints' Church, Brompton
- OS grid reference: SE 94291 82127
- Country: England
- Denomination: Church of England

Architecture
- Architectural type: Norman • Perpendicular Gothic

Specifications
- Materials: Sandstone

Administration
- Diocese: Diocese of York

All Saints' Church is the parish church of Brompton by Sawdon, a village near Scarborough, North Yorkshire, England.

The church is most famous as the location where, in 1802, the poet William Wordsworth married Mary Hutchinson. In 2002 a festival celebrated the 200th anniversary of the wedding.

There was a church on the site by the 12th century. The oldest parts of the current building are the tower and nave, which date from the 14th century, although some fragments of the earlier building are incorporated into it. The arcade, south aisle and chancel were added in the 15th century. The church was restored in 1878, and the south porch was added in 1895. The building was Grade I listed in 1967.

The church is built of sandstone with a slate roof. The steeple has a tower with three stages, large diagonal buttresses, a northeast stair turret, and bell openings with ogee-headed lights and pointed hood moulds. On the tower is an octagonal broach spire with lucarnes and a weather vane. There are embattled parapets on the porch, the aisles and the chapel, and in the nave and south wall of the chancel are three-light Perpendicular windows. The walls of the church contain re-set Norman fragments, including two figures of women, one seated, who may represent the Virgin Mary. Inside, the gallery and organ case date from 1893 and were designed by Temple Moore. The font is circular and is 13th-century. There are several monuments, including a tablet from 1580 and a wall brass from 1688.

== See also ==
- Grade I listed buildings in North Yorkshire (district)
- Listed buildings in Brompton, east North Yorkshire
