= Snainton =

Village and civil parish in North Yorkshire, England

Coordinates: 54°13′41″N 0°35′25″W

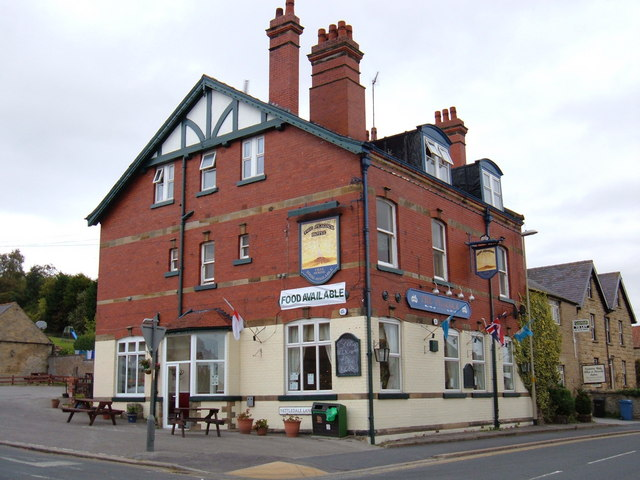
- The Peacock Hotel, Snainton

- Location within North Yorkshire
- Population: 754 (2011 census)
- OS grid reference: SE921823
  - London: 185 mi (298 km) S
- Civil parish: Snainton
- Unitary authority: North Yorkshire
- Ceremonial county: North Yorkshire
- Region: Yorkshire and the Humber
- Country: England
- Sovereign state: United Kingdom
- Post town: SCARBOROUGH
- Postcode district: YO13
- Police: North Yorkshire
- Fire: North Yorkshire
- Ambulance: Yorkshire
- UK Parliament: Scarborough and Whitby

Snainton is a village and civil parish in North Yorkshire, England.

According to the 2011 UK census, Snainton parish had a population of 754, a decrease on the 2001 UK census figure of 891.

From 1974 to 2023 it was part of the Borough of Scarborough, it is now administered by the unitary North Yorkshire Council.

The name Snainton possibly derives from the Old English Snocingtūn meaning 'settlement connected with Snoc'.

== Notable people ==
The actor Sir Ben Kingsley was born in Snainton.

George Vasey the botanist was also born in the village. He was responsible for the integration of the United States Department of Agriculture.

Sydney Cross Harland (19 July 1891 – 8 November 1982), Botanist, was born in the village, and died there in November 1982, after many commissions abroad. His great-grandfather William, was the cousin of Edward Harland.

== See also ==
- Listed buildings in Snainton
- Snainton railway station
