= Knapton (disambiguation) =

Knapton is a village in the English county of Norfolk.

Knapton may also refer to:

== Places ==
- Knapton, Scampston, a former civil parish, now in Scampston, North Yorkshire, England
  - Knapton railway station, a former station, in the East Riding of Yorkshire when open
  - East Knapton, a village
  - West Knapton, a village
- Knapton, York, a village on the outskirts of York, North Yorkshire, England
- Knapton Hill, part of the Upper Town Hill Formation of Bermuda

== People ==
- Knapton (surname)
- Viscount de Vesci, title in the Peerage of Ireland created in the 18th century for Baron Knapton
