= Gadhia =

Gadhia may refer to:

== Places ==
- Gadhia, Gujarat, India, a village on Saurashtra peninsula which was ruled by mahiya before 1602a AD than after sartansinhji jhala won and established wankaner.

Some paliyas(memorial stone) found this region was evidence of that war.

- Gadhia State, a former princely state with seat in the above town

== People ==
- Gadhia community, a Hindu community in Gujarat
- Jayne-Anne Gadhia (born 1961), British chief executive officer of Virgin Money
- Jitesh Gadhia, Baron Gadhia (born 1970), British investment banker and Life Peer
- Sameer Gadhia, lead vocalist of Californian band Young the Giant
