= Onshore oil and gas fields in the United Kingdom =

The onshore oil and gas resources in the United Kingdom are located in a number of provinces corresponding to prospective sedimentary basins. Provinces and Basins (from south to north) include the Wessex-Channel Basin, Weald Basin, Worcester Basin, Cheshire Basin, East Midlands Province, West Lancashire Basin, NE England Province, Northumberland-Solway Basin, Midland Valley of Scotland, and the Orcadian Basin.

== Background ==
The Petroleum Act 1998 confers all rights to the UK's petroleum resources to the Crown. These rights are devolved to governments and government bodies. The licensing of exploration and development of England's onshore oil and gas resources is regulated by the Oil & Gas Authority. The OGA can grant licences that confer exclusive rights to search and bore for and get petroleum, over a limited area for a limited time.

The Scotland Act 2016 devolved oil and gas licensing powers to the Scottish Government with effect from 9 February 2018.

In addition, the Office of Unconventional Gas and Oil (OUGO), is a UK Government office that promotes the safe, responsible and environmentally sound recovery of the UK's unconventional reserves of gas and oil.

The onshore oil and gas industry is represented by the United Kingdom Onshore Oil and Gas (UKOOG) industry body.

== UK onshore oil and gas fields ==
A list of current and historic UK onshore oil and gas fields is given in the table.

UK Onshore oil and gas fields
Field	Location (County, District)	Recoverable reserves, billion cubic metres or million tonnes	Operational	Cumulative production 1975–1993, tonnes	Operator (2020)	Oil or gas	Province, Basin	Reservoir geology	Source geology
Albury	Surrey	0.12 bcm	1994–		IGas plc	Gas	Wessex-Channel Basin, Weald Basin	Bridport sands, Great Oolite (Jurassic), Sherwood sandstones (Triassic)	Lower Lias (Jurassic clays)
Baxters Copse	West Sussex				IGas plc	Gas	Wessex-Channel Basin, Weald Basin	Bridport sands, Great Oolite (Jurassic), Sherwood sandstones (Triassic)	Lower Lias (Jurassic clays)
Bletchingley 2	Surrey				IGas plc	Gas	Wessex-Channel Basin, Weald Basin	Bridport sands, Great Oolite (Jurassic), Sherwood sandstones (Triassic)	Lower Lias (Jurassic clays)
Godley Bridge	Surrey					Gas	Wessex-Channel Basin, Weald Basin	Bridport sands, Great Oolite (Jurassic), Sherwood sandstones (Triassic)	Lower Lias (Jurassic clays)
Avington	Hampshire				IGas plc	Oil	Wessex-Channel Basin, Weald Basin	Bridport sands, Great Oolite (Jurassic), Sherwood sandstones (Triassic)	Lower Lias (Jurassic clays)
Bletchingley Central	Surrey				IGas plc	Oil	Wessex-Channel Basin, Weald Basin	Bridport sands, Great Oolite (Jurassic), Sherwood sandstones (Triassic)	Lower Lias (Jurassic clays)
Brockham	Surrey				Angus Energy	Oil	Wessex-Channel Basin, Weald Basin	Bridport sands, Great Oolite (Jurassic), Sherwood sandstones (Triassic)	Lower Lias (Jurassic clays)
East Herriard	Hampshire			30,000	EP UK Investments	Oil	Wessex-Channel Basin, Weald Basin	Bridport sands, Great Oolite (Jurassic), Sherwood sandstones (Triassic)	Lower Lias (Jurassic clays)
Goodworth	Hampshire				IGas plc	Oil	Wessex-Channel Basin, Weald Basin	Bridport sands, Great Oolite (Jurassic), Sherwood sandstones (Triassic)	Lower Lias (Jurassic clays)
Horndean	Hampshire	0.21 million tonnes	1988–	98,000	IGas plc	Oil	Wessex-Channel Basin, Weald Basin	Bridport sands, Great Oolite (Jurassic), Sherwood sandstones (Triassic)	Lower Lias (Jurassic clays)
Horse Hill	Surrey				UK Oil and Gas	Oil	Wessex-Channel Basin, Weald Basin	Bridport sands, Great Oolite (Jurassic), Sherwood sandstones (Triassic)	Lower Lias (Jurassic clays)
Humbly Grove	Hampshire	0.82 million tonnes	1986–date (now gas storage)	469,000	EP UK Investments	Oil	Wessex-Channel Basin, Weald Basin	Bridport sands, Great Oolite (Jurassic), Sherwood sandstones (Triassic)	Lower Lias (Jurassic clays)
Kimmeridge	Dorset		1959–date		Perenco Oil & Gas	Oil	Wessex-Channel Basin, Weald Basin	Bridport sands, Great Oolite (Jurassic), Sherwood sandstones (Triassic)	Lower Lias (Jurassic clays)
Lidsey	West Sussex				Angus Energy	Oil	Wessex-Channel Basin, Weald Basin	Bridport sands, Great Oolite (Jurassic), Sherwood sandstones (Triassic)	Lower Lias (Jurassic clays)
Palmers Wood	Surrey	0.42 million tonnes	1990–	195,000	IGas plc	Oil	Wessex-Channel Basin, Weald Basin	Bridport sands, Great Oolite (Jurassic), Sherwood sandstones (Triassic)	Lower Lias (Jurassic clays)
Singleton	West Sussex	0.35 million tonnes	1980s	78,000	IGas plc	Oil	Wessex-Channel Basin, Weald Basin	Bridport sands, Great Oolite (Jurassic), Sherwood sandstones (Triassic)	Lower Lias (Jurassic clays)
Stockbridge	Hampshire	0.684 million tonnes	1990–	168,000	IGas plc	Oil	Wessex-Channel Basin, Weald Basin	Bridport sands, Great Oolite (Jurassic), Sherwood sandstones (Triassic)	Lower Lias (Jurassic clays)
Storrington	West Sussex				IGas plc	Oil	Wessex-Channel Basin, Weald Basin	Bridport sands, Great Oolite (Jurassic), Sherwood sandstones (Triassic)	Lower Lias (Jurassic clays)
Waddock Cross	Dorset				Egdon Resources	Oil	Wessex-Channel Basin, Weald Basin	Bridport sands, Great Oolite (Jurassic), Sherwood sandstones (Triassic)	Lower Lias (Jurassic clays)
Wareham	Dorset	0.45 million tonnes	1991–date	263,000	Perenco Oil & Gas	Oil	Wessex-Channel Basin, Weald Basin	Bridport sands, Great Oolite (Jurassic), Sherwood sandstones (Triassic)	Lower Lias (Jurassic clays)
Wytch Farm	Dorset	41.10 million tonnes	1979–date		Perenco Oil & Gas	Oil	Wessex-Channel Basin, Weald Basin	Bridport sands, Great Oolite (Jurassic), Sherwood sandstones (Triassic)	Lower Lias (Jurassic clays)
Everton	Nottinghamshire					Gas	East Midlands Province	Silesian sandstones, fractured Dinantian Carboniferous limestones	Silesian (Carboniferous) mudstones and coal
Hatfield Moors	South Yorkshire	0.14 bcm	1986–date		Scottish Power plc	Gas	East Midlands Province	Silesian sandstones, fractured Dinantian Carboniferous limestones	Silesian (Carboniferous) mudstones and coal
Hatfield West	South Yorkshire		1986–2000 (storage since 2000)		Scottish Power plc	Gas	East Midlands Province	Silesian sandstones, fractured Dinantian Carboniferous limestones	Silesian (Carboniferous) mudstones and coal
Ironville	Derbyshire				Warwick Energy	Gas	East Midlands Province	Silesian sandstones, fractured Dinantian Carboniferous limestones	Silesian (Carboniferous) mudstones and coal
Saltfleetby	Lincolnshire		1999–2018		Forum Energy Services	Gas	East Midlands Province	Silesian sandstones, fractured Dinantian Carboniferous limestones	Silesian (Carboniferous) mudstones and coal
Trumfleet	South Yorkshire		1998–		Warwick Energy	Gas	East Midlands Province	Silesian sandstones, fractured Dinantian Carboniferous limestones	Silesian (Carboniferous) mudstones and coal
Beckering	Lincolnshire					Oil (for details see East Midlands oil province)	East Midlands Province	Silesian sandstones, fractured Dinantian Carboniferous limestones	Silesian (Carboniferous) mudstones and coal
Beckingham and Beckingham West	Nottinghamshire	0.01 million tonnes	1987–	10,000	IGas plc	Oil (for details see East Midlands oil province)	East Midlands Province	Silesian sandstones, fractured Dinantian Carboniferous limestones	Silesian (Carboniferous) mudstones and coal
Belvoir	Leicestershire					Oil (for details see East Midlands oil province)	East Midlands Province	Silesian sandstones, fractured Dinantian Carboniferous limestones	Silesian (Carboniferous) mudstones and coal
Bothamsall	Nottinghamshire				IGas plc	Oil (for details see East Midlands oil province)	East Midlands Province	Silesian sandstones, fractured Dinantian Carboniferous limestones	Silesian (Carboniferous) mudstones and coal
Brigg	Lincolnshire					Oil (for details see East Midlands oil province)	East Midlands Province	Silesian sandstones, fractured Dinantian Carboniferous limestones	Silesian (Carboniferous) mudstones and coal
Broughton	Lincolnshire					Oil (for details see East Midlands oil province)	East Midlands Province	Silesian sandstones, fractured Dinantian Carboniferous limestones	Silesian (Carboniferous) mudstones and coal
Cold Hanworth	Lincolnshire				IGas plc	Oil (for details see East Midlands oil province)	East Midlands Province	Silesian sandstones, fractured Dinantian Carboniferous limestones	Silesian (Carboniferous) mudstones and coal
Corringham	Lincolnshire				IGas plc	Oil (for details see East Midlands oil province)	East Midlands Province	Silesian sandstones, fractured Dinantian Carboniferous limestones	Silesian (Carboniferous) mudstones and coal
Cropwell Butler	Nottinghamshire					Oil (for details see East Midlands oil province)	East Midlands Province	Silesian sandstones, fractured Dinantian Carboniferous limestones	Silesian (Carboniferous) mudstones and coal
Crosby Warren	Lincolnshire	0.062 million tonnes plus 7 mcm of gas	1987–	59,000	Europa Oil and Gas	Oil (for details see East Midlands oil province)	East Midlands Province	Silesian sandstones, fractured Dinantian Carboniferous limestones	Silesian (Carboniferous) mudstones and coal
Dukes Wood	Nottinghamshire				Egdon Resources	Oil (for details see East Midlands oil province)	East Midlands Province	Silesian sandstones, fractured Dinantian Carboniferous limestones	Silesian (Carboniferous) mudstones and coal
Eakring	Nottinghamshire		1939–1964			Oil (for details see East Midlands oil province)	East Midlands Province	Silesian sandstones, fractured Dinantian Carboniferous limestones	Silesian (Carboniferous) mudstones and coal
East Glentworth	Lincolnshire	0.039 million tonnes	1993–	1,000	IGas plc	Oil (for details see East Midlands oil province)	East Midlands Province	Silesian sandstones, fractured Dinantian Carboniferous limestones	Silesian (Carboniferous) mudstones and coal
Egmanton	Nottinghamshire				IGas plc	Oil (for details see East Midlands oil province)	East Midlands Province	Silesian sandstones, fractured Dinantian Carboniferous limestones	Silesian (Carboniferous) mudstones and coal
Farley's Wood	Nottinghamshire	0.03 million tonnes	1985–	27,000	Onshore Oilfield Services Limited	Oil (for details see East Midlands oil province)	East Midlands Province	Silesian sandstones, fractured Dinantian Carboniferous limestones	Silesian (Carboniferous) mudstones and coal
Fiskerton Airfield	Lincolnshire				Egdon Resources	Oil (for details see East Midlands oil province)	East Midlands Province	Silesian sandstones, fractured Dinantian Carboniferous limestones	Silesian (Carboniferous) mudstones and coal
Gainborough	Lincolnshire		1987–date		IGas plc	Oil (for details see East Midlands oil province)	East Midlands Province	Silesian sandstones, fractured Dinantian Carboniferous limestones	Silesian (Carboniferous) mudstones and coal
Glentworth	Lincolnshire				IGas plc	Oil (for details see East Midlands oil province)	East Midlands Province	Silesian sandstones, fractured Dinantian Carboniferous limestones	Silesian (Carboniferous) mudstones and coal
Hemswell	Lincolnshire					Oil (for details see East Midlands oil province)	East Midlands Province	Silesian sandstones, fractured Dinantian Carboniferous limestones	Silesian (Carboniferous) mudstones and coal
Keddington	Lincolnshire				Egdon Resources	Oil (for details see East Midlands oil province)	East Midlands Province	Silesian sandstones, fractured Dinantian Carboniferous limestones	Silesian (Carboniferous) mudstones and coal
Kelham Hills	Nottinghamshire					Oil (for details see East Midlands oil province)	East Midlands Province	Silesian sandstones, fractured Dinantian Carboniferous limestones	Silesian (Carboniferous) mudstones and coal
Kinoulton	Nottinghamshire					Oil (for details see East Midlands oil province)	East Midlands Province	Silesian sandstones, fractured Dinantian Carboniferous limestones	Silesian (Carboniferous) mudstones and coal
Kirklington	Nottinghamshire	0.01 million tonnes	1991–	4,000	Egdon Resources	Oil (for details see East Midlands oil province)	East Midlands Province	Silesian sandstones, fractured Dinantian Carboniferous limestones	Silesian (Carboniferous) mudstones and coal
Long Clawson	Leicestershire	0.18 million tonnes	1990–	37,000	IGas plc	Oil (for details see East Midlands oil province)	East Midlands Province	Silesian sandstones, fractured Dinantian Carboniferous limestones	Silesian (Carboniferous) mudstones and coal
Nettleham	Lincolnshire	0.16 million tonnes	1984–	159,000	IGas plc	Oil (for details see East Midlands oil province)	East Midlands Province	Silesian sandstones, fractured Dinantian Carboniferous limestones	Silesian (Carboniferous) mudstones and coal
Newton-on-Trent	Lincolnshire				Blackland Park Exploration	Oil (for details see East Midlands oil province)	East Midlands Province	Silesian sandstones, fractured Dinantian Carboniferous limestones	Silesian (Carboniferous) mudstones and coal
Rempstone	Nottinghamshire	0.27 million tonnes	1991–	7,000	IGas plc	Oil (for details see East Midlands oil province)	East Midlands Province	Silesian sandstones, fractured Dinantian Carboniferous limestones	Silesian (Carboniferous) mudstones and coal
Scampton	Lincolnshire		–1988		IGas plc	Oil (for details see East Midlands oil province)	East Midlands Province	Silesian sandstones, fractured Dinantian Carboniferous limestones	Silesian (Carboniferous) mudstones and coal
Scampton North	Lincolnshire	0.20 million tonnes	1989–	95,000	IGas plc	Oil (for details see East Midlands oil province)	East Midlands Province	Silesian sandstones, fractured Dinantian Carboniferous limestones	Silesian (Carboniferous) mudstones and coal
South Leverton	Lincolnshire				IGas plc	Oil (for details see East Midlands oil province)	East Midlands Province	Silesian sandstones, fractured Dinantian Carboniferous limestones	Silesian (Carboniferous) mudstones and coal
Stainton	Lincolnshire	0.03 million tonnes	1987–	17,000	IGas plc	Oil (for details see East Midlands oil province)	East Midlands Province	Silesian sandstones, fractured Dinantian Carboniferous limestones	Silesian (Carboniferous) mudstones and coal
Torksey	Lincolnshire					Oil (for details see East Midlands oil province)	East Midlands Province	Silesian sandstones, fractured Dinantian Carboniferous limestones	Silesian (Carboniferous) mudstones and coal
Welton	Lincolnshire	2.50 million tonnes	1984–	1,007,000	IGas plc	Oil (for details see East Midlands oil province)	East Midlands Province	Silesian sandstones, fractured Dinantian Carboniferous limestones	Silesian (Carboniferous) mudstones and coal
West Firsby	Lincolnshire	0.16 million tonnes	1991–	31,000	Europa Oil and Gas	Oil (for details see East Midlands oil province)	East Midlands Province	Silesian sandstones, fractured Dinantian Carboniferous limestones	Silesian (Carboniferous) mudstones and coal
Whisby	Lincolnshire	0.12 million tonnes	1990–	16,000	Blackland Park Exploration	Oil (for details see East Midlands oil province)	East Midlands Province	Silesian sandstones, fractured Dinantian Carboniferous limestones	Silesian (Carboniferous) mudstones and coal
Caythorpe	North Yorkshire	0.18 bcm	1992–		Centrica Storage Holdings	Gas	NE England Province	Permian (Upper Magnesian) limestones	Silesian (Carboniferous) mudstones and coal
Eskdale	North Yorkshire		1960–1967			Gas	NE England Province	Permian (Upper Magnesian) limestones	Silesian (Carboniferous) mudstones and coal
Kirby Misperton	North Yorkshire	0.46 bcm	1994–		Third Energy Holdings	Gas	NE England Province	Permian (Upper Magnesian) limestones	Silesian (Carboniferous) mudstones and coal
Lockton	North Yorkshire		1969–1974			Gas	NE England Province	Permian (Upper Magnesian) limestones	Silesian (Carboniferous) mudstones and coal
Malton	North Yorkshire	0.27 bcm	1995–date		Third Energy Holdings	Gas	NE England Province	Permian (Upper Magnesian) limestones	Silesian (Carboniferous) mudstones and coal
Marishes	North Yorkshire	0.22 bcm	1995–date		Third Energy Holdings	Gas	NE England Province	Permian (Upper Magnesian) limestones	Silesian (Carboniferous) mudstones and coal
Pickering	North Yorkshire				Third Energy Holdings	Gas	NE England Province	Permian (Upper Magnesian) limestones	Silesian (Carboniferous) mudstones and coal
Formby	Merseyside		1939–1965			Oil	West Lancashire Basin	Sherwood sandstone (Triassic)	Silesian (Carboniferous) mudstones and coal
Elswick	Lancashire		1990–date		Cuadrilla Resources	Gas	West Lancashire Basin	Sherwood sandstone (Triassic)	Silesian (Carboniferous) mudstones and coal
Bargeddie	North Lanarkshire					Gas	Midland Valley Scotland	Silesian sandstones (Carboniferous)	Silesian (Carboniferous) mudstones and coal
Cousland	Midlothian		1937–?			Gas	Midland Valley Scotland	Silesian sandstones (Carboniferous)	Silesian (Carboniferous) mudstones and coal
Dalkeith	Midlothian		1937–?			Oil	Midland Valley Scotland	Silesian sandstones (Carboniferous)	Silesian (Carboniferous) mudstones and coal
Milton of Balgonie	Fife					Oil	Midland Valley Scotland	Silesian sandstones (Carboniferous)	Silesian (Carboniferous) mudstones and coal
–	Cheshire, Shropshire						Cheshire Basin		
–	Worcestershire						Worcester Basin		
–	Northumberland, Cumbria						Northumberland-Solway Basin		
–	Orkney, Highland, Moray, Aberdeenshire						Orcadian Basin		

== See also ==
- List of oil and gas fields in the North Sea
- Geology of the United Kingdom
- Economy of the United Kingdom
- East Midlands Oil Province
- Shale gas in the United Kingdom
- Unconventional (oil & gas) reservoir
- Hydraulic fracturing in the United Kingdom
- Underground coal gasification
- Coal bed methane
