= Scampston Bridge =

Bridge in Scampston, North Yorkshire, England

Coordinates: 54.1618°N 0.6733°W

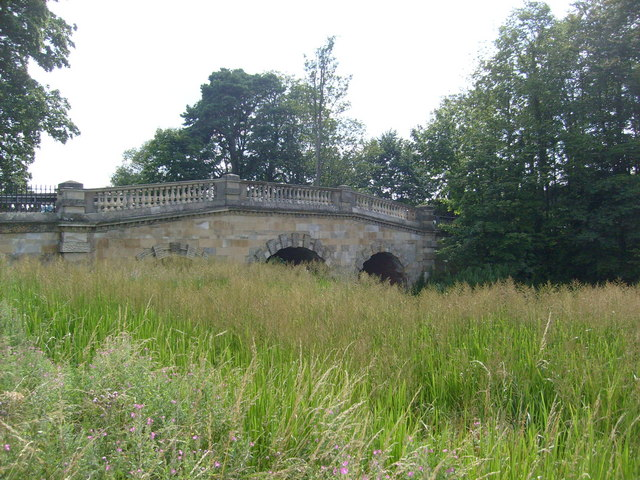
The bridge, in 2010

Scampston Bridge is a historic structure in Scampston, a village in North Yorkshire, in England.

In 1750s, Capability Brown redesigned the park at Scampston Hall. In order to enlarge the grounds, he moved the course of the main road from York to Scarborough. A new bridge was required to take the road across the Swan Beck, where it flowed into a new lake, and it was complete by 1764. The bridge was probably designed by Brown, although it has also been ascribed to Henry Holland. The bridge was widened in 1933, and now carried the A64 road. It was grade II listed in 1964.

The upstream side of the bridge is built of red brick with sandstone parapets and dressings, and the downside is in sandstone. It consists of three semicircular arches between abutments, and is flanked by alternately-rusticated pilaster piers. The parapets are balustraded over the arches and have cambered coping. The road sides of the piers flanking the central arches are inscribed with the distances to Malton, London, York and Scarborough, and the date of widening is on a plaque. Beneath the bridge is a weir.

== See also ==
- Listed buildings in Scampston
