= Ryedale gas fields =

Natural gas fields in North Yorkshire, England

Coordinates: 54.193°N 0.768°W

The Ryedale gas fields, also known as the Vale of Pickering gas fields, comprise four onshore gas producing fields in North Yorkshire, United Kingdom. The fields were discovered between 1970 and 1991. From 1995 to 2019 the gas was used as fuel for the gas-turbine driven Knapton power station. Production of gas from the fields was suspended in 2020.

== Description ==
The Ryedale gas fields are in the Vale of Pickering in the former Ryedale District of North Yorkshire. The fields are on the Southern margin of the Cleveland Basin gas dome a known prospective for natural gas. The subsurface gas reservoirs are in the Permian age Kirkham Abbey limestone carbonates and also in the underlying sandstone reservoir of the Carboniferous age. The key properties of the reservoirs, the gases and some of the infrastructure are summarised in the table.

Ryedale gas fields key data summary, adapted from Harrison et al.
Field name	Kirby Misperton		Malton	Marishes	Pickering
Block and licence number	PL080a		PL080a	DL005	
Field area (km^{2})	5.3	6.9	4.8	2.2	8.3
Geological age	Permian	Carboniferous	Permian	Permian	Permian
Geological formation	Kirkham Abbey	Millstone Grit	Kirkham Abbey	Kirkham Abbey	Kirkham Abbey
Depth to crest of reservoir (Feet true vertical depth subsea – ft TVDSS)	4,000	5,000	4,000	4,430	4,210
Temperature (°F at crest)	105	125	105	111	108
Initial pressure (pounds force per square inch absolute – psia at ft TVDSS)	2,025 at 4,272	2,581 at 5,208	1,974 at 4,074	2,210 at 4,499	2,156 at 4,482
Gas initially in place (billion cubic feet)	50.1	17.1	17.4	11.8	76.5
Average porosity (%)	12–13	11	12–13	12–13	12–13
Average permeability (mD)	0.1–1	1	0.1–1	0.1–1	0.1–1
Sour gases: CO_{2,}H_{2}S (%)	0.69, 0.1	0.54, 0	1.36, 0.09	0.45, 0.05	0.33, 0.07
Gas specific gravity	0.604	0.605	0.646	0.605	0.585
Calorific value (British Thermal Units per standard cubic feet – BTU/scf)	947	955	993	956	1028
Initial condensate/gas ratio (barrels per million standard cubic feet – bbl/MMscf)	10	1	10	2.5	10
Date discovered	1985	1985	1970	1988	1991
Date of first gas	Feb 1995	Dec 1994	Sep 1995	Jan 1995	Nov 2001
Number of production wells	6	1	2	3 (inc. 2 horizontal)	2
Number of injection wells	1				
Initial Production rate (million standard cubic feet of gas per day – MMscfgd)	6	6	5–9	4–6	4–5
Cumulative production (billion cubic feet) to March 2018	6.7	6.8	9	3.4	4.4

Gas from the fields was piped to the Knapton power station where it was treated to remove sulphur and used as fuel to power the 42 MWe gas-turbine to generate electricity. The power station was opened in 1995 and was taken offline in 2020 and was dismantled in 2021.

== Ownership ==
At the start of the North Yorkshire Power Project in the early 1990s, the gas fields were licensed by KeltPower who encouraged Scottish Power to build a 42 MW power station as the gas is very local, and no expensive gas compressors would be needed. Scottish Power bought gas from the fields at a price in the power station contract that was much lower (almost half) than that which the price of gas subsequently became. Gas from the gas fields was piped to the power station at East Knapton via six-inch pipelines.

The Ryedale gas fields and Knapton power station were bought by UK Energy Systems Ltd for $70 million from Viking UK Gas Ltd (owned by Viking Petroleum of Houston) who owned the fields since December 2003 and this company is still based in East Knapton as part of the acquisition. The fields were previously (since 1999) owned 60% by Tullow Oil (who sold their stake for $8.3 million in October 2003) and 40% by Edinburgh Oil & Gas plc (who sold their stake for £3.2 million). The fields were bought by Kelt UK Ltd (owned by Kelt Energy plc and Edinburgh Oil & Gas plc) from Candecca Resources Ltd (owned by BP) in 1992.

CeraPhi announced on 5 February 2024 that it had bought Third Energy.

== The fields ==
=== Kirby Misperton ===
This field is at Kirby Misperton near the Flamingo Land Resort. The gas field was discovered in January 1985 and production started in March 1995. The field was estimated to have recoverable reserves of 0.46 billion cubic metres. This site originally had three wells designated KM1 and KM3 (near Kirby Misperton) and KM2 (near Little Barugh). Well KM1 produced from the Carboniferous reservoir. Well KM3 is an injection well returning water and condensate into the reservoir. Gas was also received from the Malton site and the combined gas flow is piped to the Marishes site.

In August 1996 well KM2 lost delivery of gas which was believed to be due to water influx. The well was subsequently side-tracked in 2006 and redesignated KM4. It too was affected by water ingress. Well KM5 was drilled in 2009 and up to 2020 had produced 2.6 billion cubic feet (bcf) (73.6 million cubic metres) of gas. Well KM1 produced gas from the Carboniferous accumulation from December 1994 at 6 MMscfd. By 2020 it had produced a total of 6.8 bcf (193 million m^{3}). Wells KM6 and KM7 were not successful producers.

=== Malton ===
Malton gas field was discovered in 1970. with production starting in September 1995. The field was estimated to have recoverable reserves of 0.27 billion cubic metres. The site has two wells designated MN1 and MN4, both near Great Habton. Gas is piped to the Kirby Misperton site.

Well MN1 started production at 5 MMscfd in 1996 and produced 2.85 bcf (80.7 million m^{3}) by 2001. Well MN4 started production at 9 MMscfd in 1996 and had produced 6.1 bcf (173 million m^{3}) by 2001. Both were affected by water ingress. Further wells (MN2 and MN3) were subsequently drilled but were not successful.

=== Marishes ===
Marishes gas field is near High Marishes and Low Marishes near the confluence of the River Derwent and the River Rye, just north of East Knapton. This field was discovered in November 1988. The field was estimated to have recoverable reserves of 0.22 billion cubic metres. Production started in April 1995. The site has three wells designated MR1, MR2z and MR3y. MR1 produced 1.8 bcf (51 million m^{3}) of gas over 6 years at 4 to 1 MMscfd. Well MR2z produced 1.3 bcf (37 million m^{3}). MR3y produces at less than 0.5 MMscfd. Gas is received from the Kirby Misperton site and the combined gas flow is piped to the Knapton generating station site. The Marishes site is subject to flooding when river levels are high.

=== Pickering ===
The Pickering gas field was discovered in January 1992 with production starting in November 2001. Well PK1 had produced 2.1 bcf (59.5 million m^{3}) when it ceased production in 2008. PK2 initially produced at 5 MMscfd but this fell rapidly.

Other gas fields around Pickering were initially developed by Home Oil of Calgary, Alberta, Canada in the 1970s. A natural gas processing facility was formerly (1969–74) located in Pickering to treat gas from the Lockton gas field under the North York Moors National Park. See Pickering natural gas industry.

== Proposed developments ==
In 2022 Third Energy undertook a study to investigate the use of hot water from the reservoirs at up to 90 deg C to heat homes in the district.

Third Energy have proposed to develop the Knapton Energy Park with solar, combined heat/power (CHP), battery storage, and hydrogen technologies.
