= Kirby Misperton =

Village and civil parish in North Yorkshire, England

Coordinates: 54°12′17″N 0°48′23″W

- Location within North Yorkshire
- Population: 370 (2011 Census)
- OS grid reference: SE779794
- Civil parish: Kirby Misperton
- Unitary authority: North Yorkshire
- Ceremonial county: North Yorkshire
- Region: Yorkshire and the Humber
- Country: England
- Sovereign state: United Kingdom
- Post town: MALTON
- Postcode district: YO17
- Dialling code: 01653
- Police: North Yorkshire
- Fire: North Yorkshire
- Ambulance: Yorkshire
- UK Parliament: Thirsk and Malton

Kirby Misperton is a small village and civil parish in North Yorkshire, England and has a population of around 370.

It is about four miles (6 km) south from Pickering by road and about seven miles (11 km) north from Malton, just west of the A169 road.

From 1974 to 2023 the village was part of the Ryedale district. It is now administered by North Yorkshire Council.

== Geography ==
Adjacent to the village lies one of the most popular amusement parks in England, Flamingo Land Theme Park and Zoo.

A gas field nearby, discovered in 1985, pipes gas to the Knapton Generating Station. The fields were bought by Kelt UK Ltd (owned by Kelt Energy plc and Edinburgh Oil & Gas plc) from Candecca Resources Ltd (owned by BP) in 1992.

== History ==
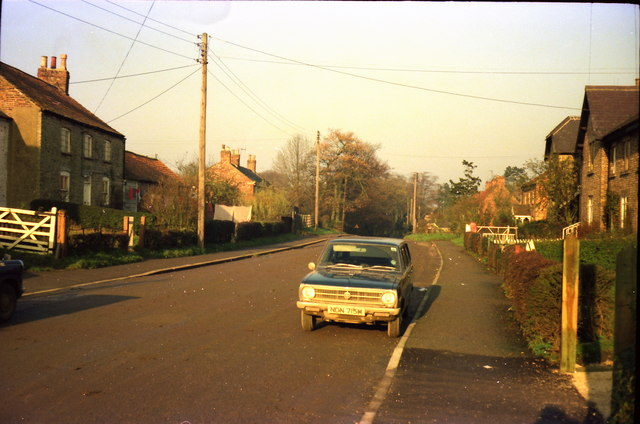
Main Street in 1976

A British (pre-roman) skeleton was found in the artificial lake at Kirkby Misperton Hall (now part of Flamingo Land) in 1866.

The place-name 'Kirby Misperton' conflates the names of two adjoining places. Kirby is first attested in the Domesday Book of 1086, where it appears as Chirchebi. This means 'church village' in Old Norse. Misperton is also first attested in the Domesday Book, where it appears as Mispeton. This may mean 'foggy hill' or 'dung hill', possibly from mistbeorg in Old English. The two names first appear together in early Yorkshire charters, as Mispertona Kirkeby circa 1090, and as Kircabimispertun in 1157.

The Domesday Book recorded a total population of 14 households (13 villagers and 1 priest) with a total tax assessed of 2.8 geld units. The Lord in 1066 was recorded as Thorbrand, son of Karli and from 1086 the Canons of York (St. Peter). The Tenant-in-chief in 1086 was Berengar of Tosny.

== Kirby Misperton Church ==
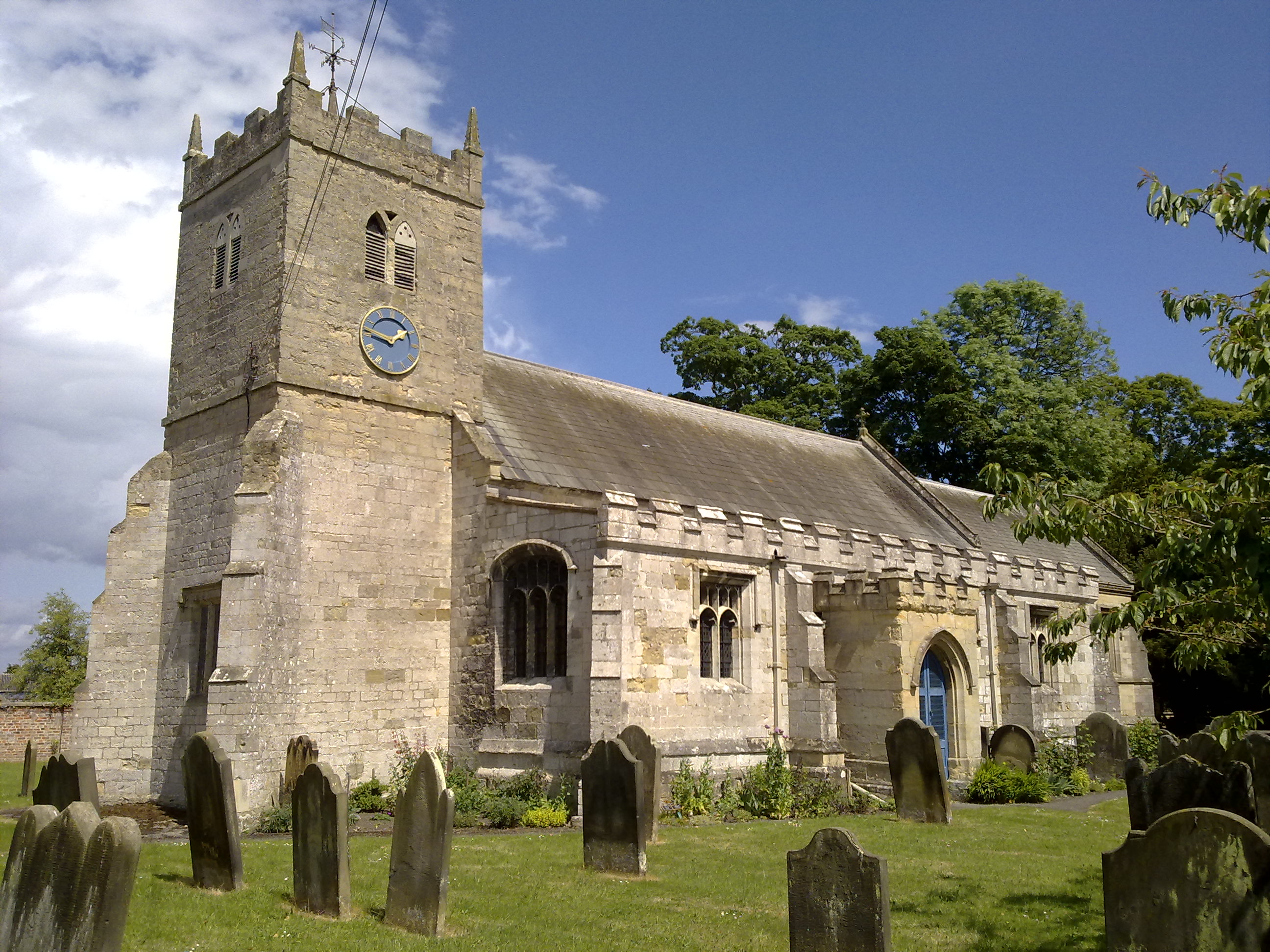
St Laurence's Church

St Laurence's Church, Kirby Misperton is part of the Benefice of Kirby Misperton, which is made up of the parishes of Kirby Misperton, Normanby and Salton, and the Benefice of Middleton, which is made up of the parishes of Middleton, Newton and Sinnington.

== Gas industry ==
Oil and gas exploration has a history in North Yorkshire dating back to the 1930s. In 1937 the first well was drilled at Eskdale on the North York Moors and in 1938 gas was discovered in a deeper second well. There was much oil and gas exploration in the Vale of Pickering during the 1970s and 1980s. A significant number of seismic surveys were shot and several fields were discovered, some of which are still in production today. During the 1980s the fields of Kirby Misperton and Marishes were discovered. Well KM-1 was drilled in March 1985 and found gas at two levels. Since 2000 eleven new wells have been drilled in North Yorkshire with drilling at Ebberston, Marishes, Pickering and Kirby Misperton.

Third Energy Onshore drilled the KM8 well (located about 500m WSW of the village of Kirby Misperton), within the Kirby Misperton gas field, during 2013. Samples were taken at several different depths to assess the hydrocarbon potential. Analysis of the gas bearing zones in the deeper Bowland section concluded that they should be appraised further. To assess their commercial potential, Third Energy applied for a hydraulic fracturing permit to stimulate gas flow from these inter-bedded sandstone and shale sections.

The planning application C3/15/00971/CPO (NY/2015/0233/ENV) submitted to North Yorkshire County Council in 2015 for the proposed hydraulic fracturing operation was approved by the Planning Committee on 23 May 2016; Friends of the Earth and a local pressure group, Frack Free Ryedale, applied for judicial review of the decision, but this application was rejected in December 2016. In October 2017, Third Energy Onshore announced its intention to begin fracking within weeks.

=== 2018 fracking suspension ===
In November 2017, opponents to the fracking operation called upon Third Energy to confirm its financial standing before commencing work; the company was over a month late in filing its accounts (which were eventually filed on 1 February 2018). In January 2018, Business Secretary Greg Clark said permission for Third Energy to frack would not be granted until financial checks had been completed by the Infrastructure and Projects Authority, amid concerns about its resilience and ability to fund clean-up costs. The 2016 accounts of its wholly owned subsidiary Third Energy UK Gas Ltd showed it made a £3.4 million loss (down from a £3.85 million loss in 2015), but owed £44.7 million to its ultimate parent company, Third Energy Holdings, based in the Cayman Islands.

Third Energy began removing equipment from the site in early February 2018, as questions about the company's finances and management continued, including about the September 2017 appointments of former Carillion interim CEO Keith Cochrane as non-executive chairman, and of Jitesh Gadhia, a Conservative party peer and donor, as a non-executive director. Cochrane and Gadhia resigned as directors in September 2018.

In October 2018, owner Barclays was reported to be considering selling Third Energy Onshore rather than invest a further £5m to make the Kirby Misperton fracking site fully functional in the next 12 months. In April 2019, the Kirby Misperton site remained dormant over a year after Third Energy Onshire vacated it; the company had earlier said it would drill at the site before the end of 2019. In July 2019, Third Energy Onshore and two sister companies were sold to York Energy, a subsidiary of US-owned Alpha Energy, raising fears that fracking preparations might be restarted.

== See also ==
- Listed buildings in Kirby Misperton
