= St Martin's Church, Scampston =

Church in North Yorkshire, England

Coordinates: 54°10′04″N 0°40′57″W

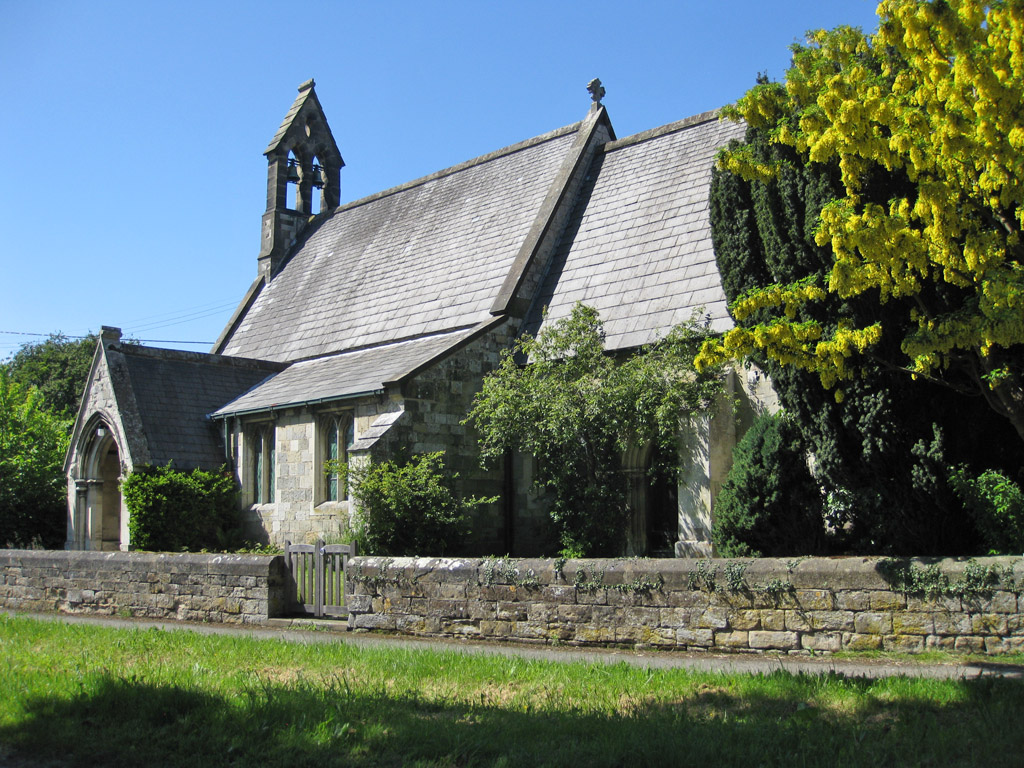
The church, in 2013

St Martin's Church is the parish church of Scampston, a village in North Yorkshire, in England.

In the Norman period, a chapel of ease to St Andrew's Church, Rillington was built in Scampston. It was a small building with a thatched roof, and in later years, the nave was used as a cottage. In 1845, it was demolished and a new church was built on the foundations, reusing part of the north and west walls. The new church was designed by George Townsend Andrews, in the Gothic revival style. The building was grade II listed in 1966.

The church is built of sandstone, with limestone buttresses and dressings, and a slate roof. It consists of a nave, north and south aisles, a south porch, a chancel and a vestry. On the west gable is a bellcote with paired pointed arches and a central octagonal shaft. The porch is gabled and has a pointed arch with a moulded surround and colonnettes with moulded capitals, and a hood mould. Inside, there is a double sedilia with a trefoil head and an octagonal font with a crocketed cover. The rood screen, stalls, altar, pulpit and prayer desk, were donated in 1906. Several windows have original stained glass borders.

== See also ==
- Listed buildings in Scampston
