= Kirby railway station =

Disused railway station in North Yorkshire, England

Kirby

General information
- Location: North Yorkshire; England
- Coordinates: 54.225290°N 0.771506°W
- Grid reference: SE801817

Other information
- Status: Disused

History
- Original company: York and North Midland Railway
- Pre-grouping: North Eastern Railway

Key dates
- 1845: opened
- 1858: closed
Location

Kirby railway station was a railway station on the York and North Midland Railway's branch line to Pickering. Named after the village of Kirby Misperton, it opened in October 1845. It closed on 1 October 1858.

Some authorities refer to this station as "Black Bull or Kirby" – Black Bull being a reference to the (much nearer) public house, which also gave its name to the nearby level crossing on the Pickering–Malton road.

The station house, which still stands, was built in stone – unusual for minor stations which were more commonly built in brick (as was nearby Marishes Road). Indeed, the Y&NM crossing keeper's house at the adjacent crossing was in brick.

The NER built a short terrace of four houses between the station building and Black Bull level crossing for platelayers and labourers.

Preceding station	Disused railways	Following station
Marishes Road; Line and station closed	Y & NMR (Pickering Branch)	Pickering; Line closed, station open
