= CeraPhi Energy =

British geothermal energy company

CeraPhi Energy Ltd
- Type: Private
- Industry: Geothermal energy
- Founded: May 17, 2013
- Headquarters: Great Yarmouth, Norfolk, England, United Kingdom
- Area served: United Kingdom and international
- Key people: Karl Farrow (CEO), Gary Williams (Co-founder)
- Products: Closed-loop geothermal systems
- Website: ceraphi.com

CeraPhi Energy Ltd is a British company that develops geothermal energy projects, focusing on closed-loop systems to extract heat from deep underground, including the repurposing of depleted oil and gas wells.

Led by CEO Karl Farrow and co-founder Gary Williams (both former oil and gas executives), the company has received media attention for converting former fossil fuel sites into renewable heat sources as part of the UK's energy transition.

== History ==
CeraPhi Energy was incorporated on 8 June 2020,with a focus on geothermal development, applying expertise for the oil and gas sector to develop its closed loop technology called CeraPhiWell.

In 2022, it received funding from the Net Zero Technology Centre to study repurposing offshore oil and gas wells for geothermal.

In February 2024, CeraPhi acquired Third Energy Limited, gaining suspended gas wells and infrastructure in North Yorkshire for potential geothermal conversion. The Kirby Misperton site, previously linked to fracking protests, has been noted in media as a candidate for this transition.

== Technology ==
The CeraPhiWell is a closed-loop geothermal systems in which a working fluid circulates within a deep closed well to extract subsurface heat without direct contact with formations or water extraction. This design targets non-volcanic regions and allows repurposing of existing hydrocarbon wells.

Reports describe the approach as a potential option for decarbonising heat in the UK, although the sector is still emerging and requires additional support to scale.

== Projects ==
CeraPhi has undertaken feasibility studies and development for geothermal applications, particularly site repurposing in North Yorkshire.

Media coverage highlights:

- The Kirby Misperton site (via Third Energy acquisition), where testing has examined geothermal heat extraction from deep wells.
- Scunthorpe Hospital in Northern Lincolnshire, where CeraPhi delivered its first commercial geothermal heating installation in the UK, providing heat for the NHS facility.
- Other UK studies for heating in community and public sector settings.

The company has also provided written evidence to a UK parliamentary committee on geothermal's potential role in net zero targets and associated policy needs.
