= Third Energy Onshore =

British oil and gas company

Third Energy Onshore Ltd is a UK company involved in oil and gas exploration, including proposals for fracking operations in Kirby Misperton, North Yorkshire.

The company was incorporated as Viking Petroleum UK Ltd in October 2003. In December 2003, it acquired a 40% holding in the Ryedale gas fields in North Yorkshire from Edinburgh Oil and Gas plc. In October 2013, Viking acquired Tullow Oil's 60% share in onshore oil interests relating to the North Yorkshire gas fields and operation of the gas-fired Knapton Power Station in October 2013 (Knapton is supplied by gas wells in the Kirby Misperton area). Viking changed its name to Third Energy Onshore in October 2013.

Third Energy Onshore was 97% owned by Barclays' private equity division, Barclays Natural Resource Investments; its ultimate parent company, Third Energy Holdings, is based in the Cayman Islands. Sister company Third Energy Offshore was acquired from Third Energy Holdings by Hague and London Oil plc in September 2018, with the deal formally approved in December 2018.

In October 2018, owner Barclays was reported to be considering selling Third Energy Onshore rather than invest a further £5m to make the Kirby Misperton fracking site fully functional in the next 12 months. In March 2019, financial adviser Lazard was reported to be talking to rival energy companies about investing in or acquiring Third Energy Onshore's business. In July 2019, Third Energy Onshore and two sister companies were sold to York Energy, a subsidiary of US-owned Alpha Energy.

== Kirby Misperton fracking ==
In November 2014, Third Energy Onshore announced its intention to apply for permission to frack near Kirby Misperton. In July 2015 Third Energy Onshore applied to North Yorkshire County Council for planning permission to frack a well drilled in 2013 and to produce gas from it. Permission was granted in May 2016; Friends of the Earth and a local pressure group, Frack Free Ryedale, applied for judicial review of the decision, but this application was rejected in December 2016. In October 2017, Third Energy Onshore announced its intention to begin fracking within weeks.

In November 2017, opponents to the fracking operation called upon the company to confirm its financial standing before commencing work; the company was over a month late in filing its accounts (which were eventually filed on 1 February 2018). In January 2018, Business Secretary Greg Clark said permission for Third Energy Onshore to frack would not be granted until financial checks had been completed by the Infrastructure and Projects Authority, amid concerns about its resilience and ability to fund clean-up costs. The 2016 accounts of Third Energy UK Gas Ltd showed it made a £3.4m loss (down from a £3.85m loss in 2015), but owed £44.7m to its ultimate parent company, Third Energy Holdings, based in the Cayman Islands.

Third Energy Onshore began removing equipment from the site in early February 2018, as questions about the company's finances and management continued, including about the September 2017 appointments of former Carillion interim CEO Keith Cochrane as non-executive chairman, and of Jitesh Gadhia, a Conservative party peer and donor and a non-executive director at HM Treasury body UK Financial Investments (which advises government on dealing with financially distressed businesses) as a non-executive director. Cochrane and Gadhia resigned as directors in September 2018.

In April 2019, the Kirby Misperton site remained dormant over a year after Third Energy Onshire vacated it; the company had earlier said it would drill at the site before the end of 2019. The July 2019 completion of Third Energy Onshore's sale raised fears that fracking might be restarted at Kirby Misperton.
