= Knapton, Scampston =

Coordinates: 54.1702°N 0.6526°W

Knapton
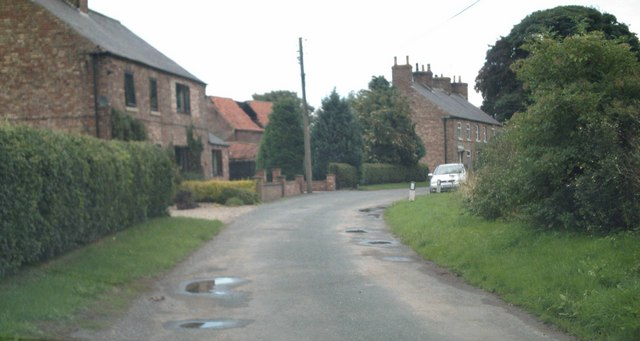
- East Knapton

- Location within North Yorkshire
- Civil parish: Scampston
- Unitary authority: North Yorkshire
- Ceremonial county: North Yorkshire
- Region: Yorkshire and the Humber
- Country: England
- Sovereign state: United Kingdom
- Police: North Yorkshire
- Fire: North Yorkshire
- Ambulance: Yorkshire

Knapton is a former civil parish, now in the parish of Scampston, in North Yorkshire, England. The parish included the hamlets of East Knapton and West Knapton. In 1931 the parish had a population of 236.

== History ==
The name origin of "Knapton" is uncertain and may mean 'Cnapa's farm/settlement' or 'servant's/boy's farm/settlement'. Knapton was recorded in the Domesday Book as Cnapeton/Cnapetone. In the Domesday Book, Knapton in the hundred of Toreshou, is mentioned as being held in 1066 by Edeva, wife of Topi, and in 1086 by Ranulph de Mortimer. Knapton was formerly a township and chapelry in the parish of Wintringham, in 1866 Knapton became a separate civil parish, in 1894 it became part of Norton Rural District, on 1 April 1935 the parish was abolished and merged with Scampston. In 1974 the area became part of the non-metropolitan district of Ryedale and the county of North Yorkshire. In 2023 the area became part of North Yorkshire district.

== Church ==
The parish church was the St Edmund's Church, Knapton, located in the grounds of Knapton Hall.
