= St Francis' Church, Low Marishes =

Church building in North Yorkshire, England

Coordinates: 54°11′02″N 0°44′49″W

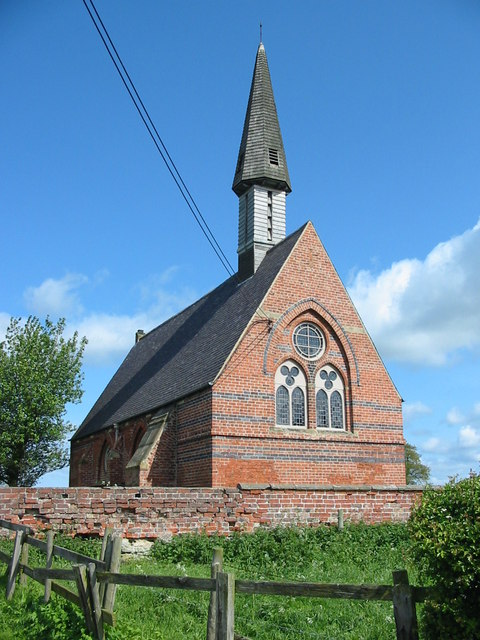
The church, in 2006

St Francis' Church is a chapel of ease in Low Marishes, a village in the civil parish of Marishes, in North Yorkshire, England.

The church was constructed in 1861, as a chapel of ease to St Peter and St Paul's Church, Pickering. It is in the 13th-century Gothic style, with a prominent spire. Its designer is unknown, but the church claims that "the competence of its design suggests the work of a major architect". A porch was added in about 1870. The church was grade II listed in 1996. In 2004, it was discovered that the church had never received a licence for public worship. When one was granted, the church was dedicated to Saint Francis.

The church is built of red brick, with dressings in blue brick and stone, and a slate roof. It consists of a nave and a chancel in one cell, and an added west porch. On the roof is a square wooden bell turret with an octagonal shingled spire. On the north and south walls are buttresses, and recessed pointed arches containing circular windows. Inside, there are a wooden chancel screen, altar, reredos, altar rail, octagonal pulpit and pews.

== See also ==
- Listed buildings in Marishes
