= Marishes Road railway station =

Disused railway station in North Yorkshire, England

Marishes Road
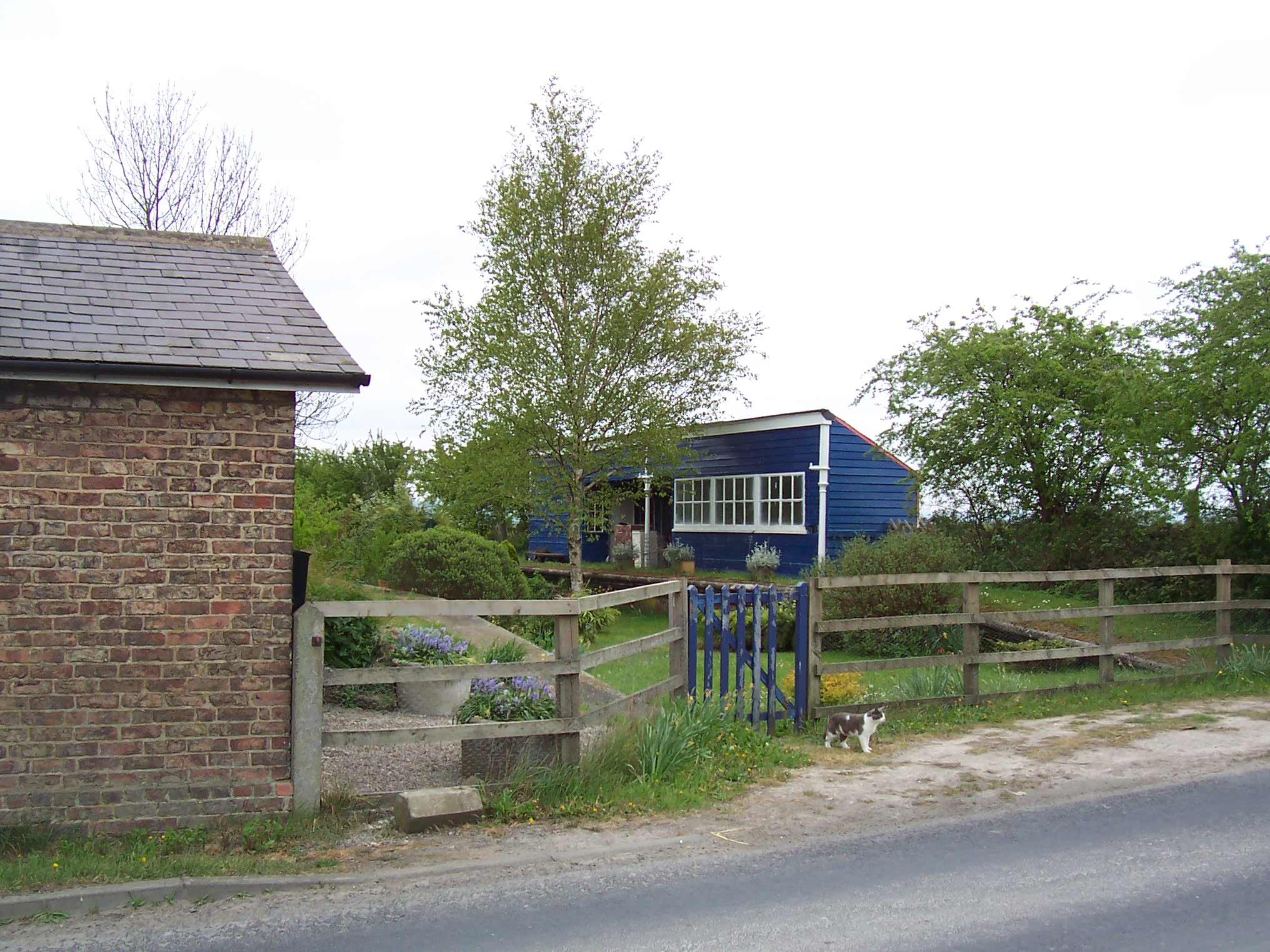
- The former station at Marishes Road

General information
- Location: Marishes, North Yorkshire; England
- Coordinates: 54.2032°N 0.7433°W
- Grid reference: SE820793
- Platforms: 2

Other information
- Status: Disused

History
- Original company: York and North Midland Railway
- Pre-grouping: North Eastern Railway
- Post-grouping: London and North Eastern Railway

Key dates
- 5 July 1845: opened
- 1848: renamed
- 8 March 1965: closed
Location

Marishes Road railway station was a railway station on the York and North Midland Railway's branch line to Pickering. It opened on 5 July 1845, and until 1848 was called High Marishes, after the village of that name. It closed on 8 March 1965 (although freight to Pickering continued for a further year). The last passenger to use the station was Prince Philip, the Duke of Edinburgh, who was in the royal train when it was stabled overnight in Marishes Road in June 1965, so the duke could visit RAF Fylingdales the next day.

Since closure the main station buildings have remained intact, with the exception of the small wooden signal box which stood immediately north-east of the level crossing - which is now an exhibition as part of Pickering Station Trail on the NYMR. All signals have also disappeared, including the fine NER lattice post up home signal.

Preceding station	Disused railways	Following station
Rillington; Line and station closed	Y & NMR (Pickering Branch)	Kirby; Line and station closed
