= Listed buildings in Scampston =

Scampston is a civil parish in the county of North Yorkshire, England. It contains 22 listed buildings that are recorded in the National Heritage List for England. Of these, three are listed at Grade II*, the middle of the three grades, and the others are at Grade II, the lowest grade. The parish contains the village of Scampston, the hamlets of East Knapton and West Knapton, and the surrounding countryside. An important building in the parish is the country house Scampston Hall, which is listed together with associated buildings and structures in its garden and park. Elsewhere, the other listed buildings include houses and cottages, a bridge, milestones, and two churches.

== Key ==
Grade	Criteria
II*	Particularly important buildings of more than special interest
II	Buildings of national importance and special interest

== Buildings ==
Name and location	Photograph	Date	Notes	Grade
Scampston Hall, gateways, walls and piers 54.16835°N 0.67697°W		Late 17th century	A country house that was altered in the late 18th century, and largely remodelled in 1800–03. It is built in orange-red brick, limewashed at the front and stuccoed elsewhere, and has a slate roof. There are two storeys, and the entrance front has seven bays, the middle bays bowed with a hemicycle of giant Tuscan columns in antis. Steps lead up to the doorway, and the windows are sashes. Above is a moulded eaves cornice and a parapet , partly balustraded. The garden front has nine bays and a central bow window with Tuscan pilasters, over which is an attic storey with a dome. The gateway has a segmental arch with a keystone and ball and pedestal finials. This is flanked by walls with moulded coping, and the end piers have similar finials.	II*
Scampston Bridge; 54.16186°N 0.67321°W		c. 1761	The bridge, which was widened in 1933, carries the A64 road over the tail of a lake. The upstream side is in red brick with sandstone parapets and dressings, and the downside is in sandstone. It consists of three semicircular arches between abutments, and is flanked by alternately-rusticated pilaster piers. The parapets are balustraded over the arches and have cambered coping. The road sides of the piers flanking the central arches are inscribed with the distances to Malton, London, York and Scarborough, and the date of widening is on a plaque.	II
Field building 54.16768°N 0.67155°W		Mid to late 18th century	A stable and loft in Scampston Hall Estate, it is in pink-red brick with sandstone dressings, a stepped dentilled eaves cornice, and a pantile roof with coped gables and shaped kneelers. There is one storey and three bays. On the front are three round-arched openings with moulded imposts and keystones, the centre arch a doorway and the outer arches windows. On the right return is a doorway and a pitching window.	II
Deer Park House; 54.15879°N 0.66533°W	—	1767–68	The building, in Scampston Park, is in red brick, with sandstone dressings and a roof of pantile and tile. There is a square plan and later rear extensions. It consists of a two-storey canted central bay flanked by one-storey bays. In the centre is a doorway with an ogee-headed fanlight. The windows have Gothic glazing, those in the upper floor are sashes with pointed heads. Between the floors is a dentilled string course forming an eaves cornice over the side bays. At the top are embattled parapets with flat coping stones, shaped in the centre over a recessed blind trefoil. At the rear is a timber-cased cast iron pump.	II*
Palladian Bridge; 54.16887°N 0.67528°W		c. 1775	The bridge and garden pavilion were designed by Capability Brown. The bridge is in sandstone, and has three segmental arches of voussoirs between pilaster piers, and a moulded cornice. Standing on the bridge is the pavilion, in orange-red brick with timber columns and a hipped slate roof. There is a T-shaped plan, with three bays and a projecting rear bay. On the front are pairs of Ionic columns and a decorated frieze, above which a moulded dentiled cornice. Over the middle bay is a pediment with a duck acroterion. Along the front is a balustrade of cast iron railings. The rear bay contains a blind lunette window, and an impost band.	II*
Pump house and sunken walls 54.16867°N 0.67552°W		1778	The former pump house is in orange-red brick on a sandstone base, with stone coping. The east side contains a low segmental-arched opening with a blocked roundel above, and on the south side is a segmental arch between shaped abutments over a channel running through the building. The west side has a doorway, and on the north side is a sunken panel with the date. To the south, and sunken, are walls of the former sluice.	II
Stableyard buildings and attached wall, gates and gate posts 54.16914°N 0.67609°W	—	1780	The buildings to the northeast of Scampston Hall consist of a carriage house with a loft, stables, and a workshop, and are in mottled brick with roofs of red and blue pantile. The yard wall is in mottled brick with cambered sandstone coping, and the gates and gate posts are in cast iron. Between the gate posts is a segmental-arched overthrow with a spear finial. On the carriage house is a recessed date panel in a raised surround.	II
Ice house 54.16613°N 0.67353°W		Late 18th to early 19th century	The ice house, in Scampston Park, is in pink-red brick, and has a circular plan and a conical top. It has a round-arched entrance, flanked by canted walls.	II
Cundill Cottage and Dallimore Cottage; 54.16796°N 0.68100°W	—	Early 19th century	A pair of cottages in mottled brick, with a dentillled eaves course and a pantile roof. There are two storeys and four bays. In the centre of each cottage is a doorway, the left with an oblong fanlight, and the windows are horizontally sliding sashes.	II
Knapton Lodge; 54.18637°N 0.66498°W	—	Early 19th century	The house is in brick, with coped gables. There are two storeys, five bays, and a rear wing. The central doorway has an oblong fanlight with a fluted surround and angle roundels. The windows are sashes with wedge lintels.	II
Milestone near Mill Grange; 54.16884°N 0.63674°W		Early 19th century (probable)	The milestone on the north side of the A64 road is in sandstone. It has a round head and is about 0.9 metres (2 ft 11 in) in height, and the lettering is virtually illegible.	II
Milestone west of the gates to Scampston Hall; 54.16884°N 0.63674°W		Early 19th century (probable)	The milestone on the north side of the A64 road is in sandstone and has a round head. Attached to it is a cast iron rectangular panel with a raised border inscribed with the distances to Scarborough and Malton.	II
Milestone south of Knapton Lodge; 54.18241°N 0.66206°W		Early 19th century (probable)	The milestone on the west side of Malton Road (B1258 road) is in sandstone, it has a round head and is about 0.75 metres (2 ft 6 in) in height. Attached to it is a cast iron rectangular panel with a raised border inscribed with the distances to Scarborough and Malton.	II
Milestone southeast of Ings Farm; 54.19406°N 0.64860°W		Early 19th century (probable)	The milestone on the northwest side of Malton Road (B1258 road) is in sandstone, it has a round head and is about 1 metre (3 ft 3 in) in height. Attached to it is a cast iron rectangular panel with a raised border inscribed with the distances to Scarborough and Malton.	II
Gates and gate piers west of Scampston Hall; 54.16831°N 0.68024°W	—	Early 19th century	The gate piers are in sandstone, with alternate vermiculated and smooth bands, and shallow pilasters with scrolled volutes on the sides. Above are moulded cornices and ball and pedestal finials, the balls with rusticated bands. Between them are double cast iron gates.	II
Wall, gate and gate piers south of Scampston Hall; 54.16772°N 0.67632°W	—	Early 19th century	The wall and gate piers are in sandstone. The piers have bands of rustication, and moulded cornices and ball and pedestal finials. The wall is rusticated, it is about 1.1 metres (3 ft 7 in) in height, and has moulded coping, and the gate is in wrought iron and has scrolled ironwork.	II
Gates, gate piers, walls and railings, Lodge to Scampston Hall; 54.16190°N 0.68070°W		Early 19th century	The gate piers and wall are in sandstone. The piers have a square section, raised panels on two sides and sunk panels on the others, double cornices, and shallow pyramidal caps. The low flanking walls have chamfered coping and cast iron railings, and end piers. There are double carriage gates and flanking footgates in timber and cast iron.	II
Sundial; 54.16797°N 0.67671°W	—	Early 19th century	The sundial, to the south of Scampston Hall, is in sandstone, and consists of a vase-shaped fluted pedestal on an octagonal base, and is about 1.2 metres (3 ft 11 in) in height. The pedestal is decorated with acanthus leaves, gadroons, key patterns and Vitruvian scrolls. On the top is a copper dial and gnomon.	II
Keeper's Cottage; 54.16773°N 0.68095°W	—	Early to mid-19th century	The house is in pinkish brick with a dentilled eaves course and a slate roof. There are two storeys and two bays. The central doorway has an oblong fanlight, and the windows are sashes with flat arches.	II
Lodge to Scampston Hall; 54.16206°N 0.68080°W		c. 1840	The lodge at the entry to the drive is in stuccoed sandstone on a plinth, with quoins, overhanging eaves and a pyramidal slate roof. There is one storey and three bays. The doorway has a fanlight, the windows are cross windows, and all the openings have raised surrounds.	II
St Martin's Church, Scampston; 54.16784°N 0.68252°W		1845–46	The church, designed by G. T. Andrews, is in sandstone, with limestone buttresses and dressings, and a slate roof. It consists of a nave, north and south aisles, a south porch, a chancel and a vestry. On the west gable is a bellcote with paired pointed arches and a central octagonal shaft. The porch is gabled and has a pointed arch with a moulded surround and colonnettes with moulded capitals, and a hood mould.	II
St Edmund's Church, East Knapton; 54.16913°N 0.65301°W	—	c. 1870	The church is in sandstone, and has a slate roof with pierced terracotta cresting. It consists of a polygonal west baptistry with a south porch, a nave, a north aisle, a chancel and a south vestry. On the west end of the nave is a bellcote. The vestry has a semi-octagonal plan, an octagonal spire and a finial.	II
