= Listed buildings in Kirby Misperton =

Kirby Misperton is a civil parish in the county of North Yorkshire, England. It contains three listed buildings that are recorded in the National Heritage List for England. Of these, one is listed at Grade II*, the middle of the three grades, and the others are at Grade II, the lowest grade. The parish contains the village of Kirby Misperton and the surrounding area, and the listed buildings consist of a church, an obelisk and a former rectory.

== Key ==
Grade	Criteria
II*	Particularly important buildings of more than special interest
II	Buildings of national importance and special interest

== Buildings ==
Name and location	Photograph	Date	Notes	Grade
St Laurence's Church; 54.20574°N 0.80696°W		14th century	The church has been altered and enlarged through the centuries, and the chancel was rebuilt in 1875 by C. Hodgson Fowler. It is built in sandstone with a stone flag roof, and consists of a nave, a south aisle, a south porch, a chancel and a vestry, and a west tower. The tower has two stages, diagonal offset buttresses, a two-light mullioned west window with a hood mould, paired bell openings, string courses, and an embattled parapet with crocketed pinnacles and a wrought iron weathervane. The aisle and porch also have embattled parapets.	II*
Obelisk; 54.20704°N 0.80294°W	—	1812	The obelisk is in sandstone, on a moulded base and a plain plinth. It has a square plan, and consists of a tapering column with a moulded cornice.	II
Old Rectory and railings 54.20590°N 0.80801°W	—	c. 1840	The rectory, later used for other purposes, is in sandstone on a plinth, with moulded floor and sill bands, a moulded eaves cornice, and a hipped slate roof. There are two storeys and fronts of three and five bays. On the front is a semicircular bay window with Tuscan columns, and the other windows are sashes. The entrance is in the left return it is approached by steps with railings, and to the left is a screen wall containing a doorway with a fanlight.	II
