= Listed buildings in Marishes =

Marishes is a civil parish in the county of North Yorkshire, England. It contains four listed buildings that are recorded in the National Heritage List for England. All the listed buildings are designated at Grade II, the lowest of the three grades, which is applied to "buildings of national importance and special interest". The parish contains the areas of High Marishes and Low Marishes and the surrounding countryside. The listed buildings consist of two farmhouses, a house and a church.

== Buildings ==
Name and location	Photograph	Date	Notes
Little Deerholme Grange Farmhouse; 54.19327°N 0.75573°W	—	Late 18th century	The farmhouse is in red brick with a stepped eaves course and a pantile roof. There are two storeys and two bays, a single-bay extension on the left, and an outshut. On the front is a doorway, and the windows are horizontally-sliding sashes with segmental heads.
Grove House; 54.17626°N 0.76512°W	—	Late 18th century	A house and a cottage, later combined and extended, it is in red and variegated brick with extensions in stone, and has a pantile roof with coped gables and shaped kneelers. There are two storeys, an original range of two bays, and a two-bay extension. The doorway is in the extension, and the widows are sashes, some with segmental arches.
Howebridge Farmhouse; 54.17670°N 0.75953°W		Early 19th century	The farmhouse is in red brick, and has a hipped pantile roof. There are two storeys, a double-depth plan, three bays, and a rear wing. The doorway has a divided fanlight, the windows are sashes, and all the openings have flat heads.
Low Marishes Church; 54.18395°N 0.74689°W		1861	The church, which was extended in 1870, is in red brick, with dressings in blue brick and stone, and a slate roof. It consists of a nave and a chancel in one cell, and an added west porch. On the roof is a square wooden bell turret with an octagonal shingled spire. On the north and south walls are buttresses, and recessed pointed arches containing circular windows.
