= St Laurence's Church, Kirby Misperton =

Church in North Yorkshire, England

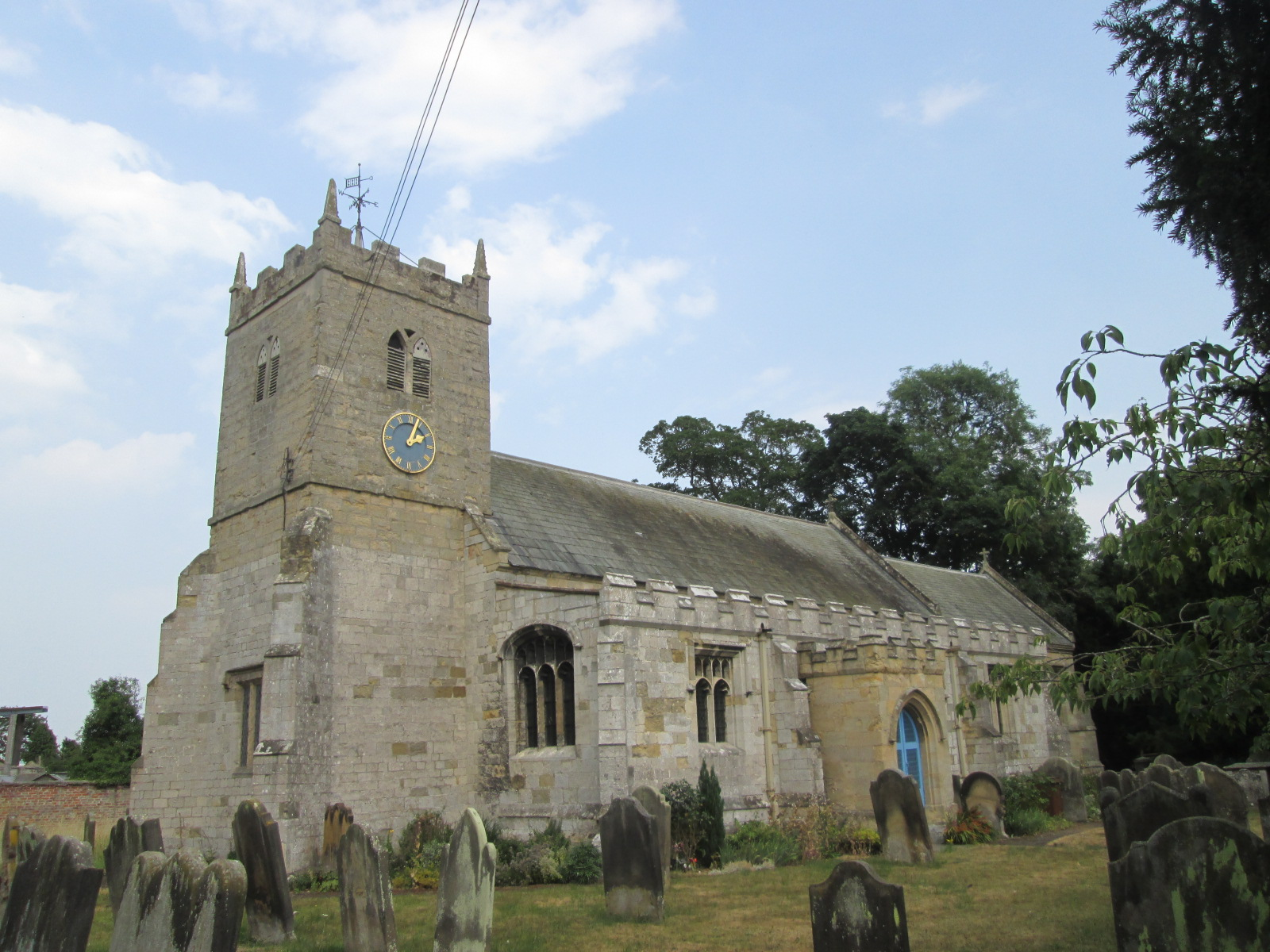
The church, in 2018

St Laurence's Church is the parish church of Kirby Misperton, a village in North Yorkshire, in England.

There is believed to have been a church on the site in the 10th century, from which some reused stones survive. It appears to have been rebuilt in the Norman period, and the chancel arch from this period survived into the 19th century. The oldest parts of the current building are the nave, south aisle, vestry and lower part of the tower, which are all 14th century. The porch and belfry were rebuilt in about 1838, then the chancel was rebuilt by C. Hodgson Fowler in 1875, who had been commissioned by George Body. The church was grade II* listed in 1953.

The church is built of sandstone with a stone flag roof, and consists of a nave, a south aisle, a south porch, a chancel and a vestry, and a west tower. The tower has two stages, diagonal offset buttresses, a two-light mullioned west window with a hood mould, paired bell openings, string courses, and an embattled parapet with crocketed pinnacles and a wrought iron weathervane. The aisle and porch also have embattled parapets. Inside, there is an octagonal font on a 19th-century pedestal. Incorporated in the stone work of the chancel walls are a number of wheeled crosses and fragments of a tomb headstone, inscribed "Tatburg".

In 1886 the East window commemorating the family of rector Charles John Symson was removed to its present position near the pulpit and replaced by that given in memory of Squire and Mrs Robert Tindall. The window above the altar depicting the Blessed Virgin Mary and the Infant Christ is a memorial to two former rectors and was dedicated on the Feast of the Purification in 1949 by Eric Milner-White, Dean of York. The crucifix on the Lady Chapel altar came from the disused Mission Church at Ryton. The carved oak lectern, at the base of which may be seen the figure of St Laurence, was given by Miss Jane Tindall of Kirby Misperton Hall, in 1891. The baptistry is dedicated to the memory of Canon Rev. Frederick William Drake, rector 1914–1928. On the walls are baptismal rolls dating back to the early 1920s. The tower, of which the lower half is from the 15th century, houses three bells, recast by Mears of Newcastle at the expense of Charles Duncombe, 1st Baron Feversham, to commemorate the coronation of Queen Victoria in 1838. In 1891 the present church clock, made by Potts of Leeds, was given by the rector W. H. Hutchings.

Alexander Neville was a cleric at Kirby Misperton and rose to become the Archbishop of York, was subsequently deposed, and exiled to France, where, he ended his days as a parish priest in Louvain. Other notable rectors include John Thornborough who became chaplain to Queen Elizabeth I, was one of the translators of the Authorised Version of the Bible, and died Bishop of Worcester at the age of 90 in 1641. His immediate successor, Peter Rollock, was a member of the Scottish Privy Council, and sometime Titular Bishop of Dunkeld. In the early 19th century the Rev'd. and Hon Augustus Duncombe held the Living for seven years and became Dean of York in 1858. George Body, who rebuilt the chancel, was a noted preacher and writer in his day and one of the leaders of Anglo-Catholicism.

== See also ==
- Grade II* listed churches in North Yorkshire (district)
- Listed buildings in Kirby Misperton
