= Rillington railway station =

Disused railway station in North Yorkshire, England

Rillington
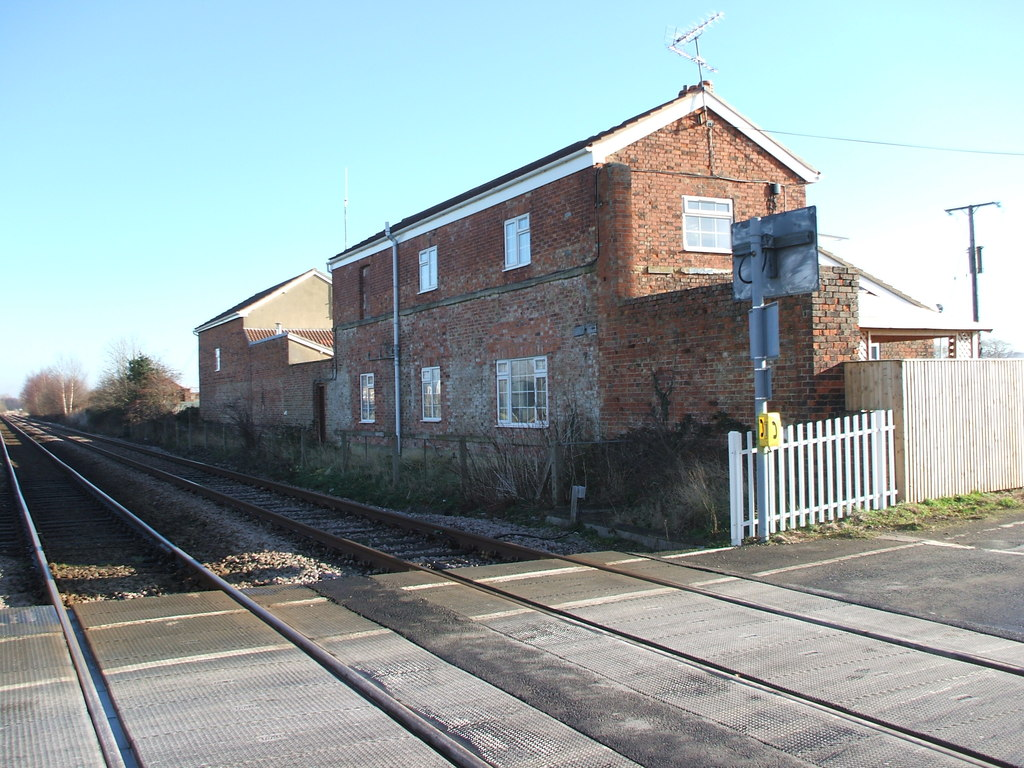
- Station building now a private house as in 2008

General information
- Location: Rillington, North Yorkshire; England
- Coordinates: 54.166400°N 0.707700°W
- Grid reference: SE845752
- Platforms: 3

Other information
- Status: Disused

History
- Original company: York and North Midland Railway
- Pre-grouping: North Eastern Railway
- Post-grouping: London and North Eastern Railway

Key dates
- 5 July 1845: Opened
- 22 September 1930: Closed for regular passenger trains
- 10 August 1964: Closed completely
Location

Rillington railway station (Rillington Junction until 1890) was a railway station serving the village of Rillington in North Yorkshire, England and on the York to Scarborough Line. It was also the junction station for the line to Whitby and was opened on 5 July 1845 by the York and North Midland Railway. It closed to normal passenger traffic on 22 September 1930, but was used by special trains until the 1960s. The goods yard was closed on 10 August 1964. The station building has been converted to a private house but the remainder of the station has now been demolished.

Though the station served Rillington, it was located almost 1 mile (1.6 km) away from the village.

== History ==
Rillington station was opened by the York & North Midland Railway in July 1845. Originally intended to by an interchange station for trains along the 6 3/4-mile (10.9 km) branch towards Pickering (and thence horse-drawn trains to Whitby), the station was provided with an overall roof straddling all lines, known as a trainshed and a station building with bay windows designed by George Townsend Andrews.

The station had three platforms and an east-facing coal depot. Two of the platforms were on the main through line, and the third was a bay platform for services on the Whitby line. The goods shed was located on the other side of the level crossing to the station, with a west-facing connection (towards Malton). Originally, before the Forge Valley and the direct line to Whitby were opened from Scarborough, passengers travelling between Whitby and Scarborough had to change at Rillington. This prompted the railway company to build a curve east of the station connecting the Whitby and Scarborough lines in 1865. However, the daily average of passengers using the avoiding line was low (about 31 per day), so after some time, it was formally disused (by 1870), and the track lifted in 1880. Bradshaw labelled the station as Rillington Junction until the 1890 timetable, when it became simply Rillington.

As an economy measure, most intermediate stations on the line between York and Scarborough, were closed in 1930. Passenger receipts at the smaller hamlet and village stations such as at Rillington were quite poor (it issued nearly 13,000 tickets in 1911 for a population of 1,164), but had long ceased to be an interchange point between trains as the Whitby line services continued to Malton, and most passengers changed there instead of at Rillington. As the station was nearly a mile from the village of the same name, and an improved bus service took the passengers away, closure came in September 1930. However, the platforms were retained at most stations to allow for excursions or special traffic; some trains in the 1950s were booked to call at Rillington for railway staff to board or alight. In the early 1950s, the roof of the trainshed was stripped back to the steelwork to reduce the load on the structure, but even that was completely removed in 1955.

The station building (on the up side of the line - towards Malton) survives, but it has been heavily modified.

== Accidents and incidents ==
- 27 August 1908, George William Featherstone, died at the age of 14. He worked as a casual porter. The accident occurred when he was shunting five wagons and misplaced a brake stick causing him to fall in front of a wagon, killing him. It was determined that this accident was caused by Featherstone's inexperience, which resulted in the North Eastern Railway Company to no longer employ under-16s for shunting operations.

Preceding station	Historical railways	Following station
Malton	Y&NMR; York to Scarborough Line	Knapton; Station closed; Line open
	Disused railways	
Terminus	Y & NMR (Pickering Branch)	Marishes Road
