= St Edmund's Church, Knapton =

Church in North Yorkshire, England

Coordinates: 54°10′09″N 0°39′11″W

St Edmund's Church is an Anglican church in East Knapton, a village in North Yorkshire, in England.

In the Mediaeval period, Knapton had a chapel of ease in the parish of St Peter's Church, Wintringham. In 1856, it was described simply as a "small building". In about 1870, it was demolished, and a new church was built in the grounds of Knapton Hall. John Gibson and Son are described as having built the north aisle and chancel between 1870 and 1872, and restored the bellcote; it is probable that the same firm designed the remainder of the building around this time. The church reuses some earlier stonework in the south wall. Nikolaus Pevsner praised the building as "one of the most enjoyable churches in the Riding". Around 1970, the church became redundant, but it was transferred to a private trust and was used for around six services each year. The building was grade II listed in 1987. By 2012, the building was in a poor state of repair, needing a new roof, and it has since closed for worship and been deconsecrated.

The church is built of sandstone, and has a slate roof with pierced terracotta cresting. It consists of a polygonal west baptistry with a south porch, a nave, a north aisle, a chancel and a south vestry. On the west end of the nave is a bellcote. The vestry has a semi-octagonal plan, an octagonal spire and a finial. Set in the south wall are three Norman corbels. Inside, the original pulpit, lectern and prayer desk survive, and some 17th-century pew panelling has been reused on the north wall. There is an octagonal stone font, and a painted royal coat of arms dating from 1676. The windows are filled with stained glass, and the roofs have painted decoration, that in the baptistry depicting animals and vegetation.

== See also ==
- Listed buildings in Scampston
