= Gadhia (community) =

The Gadhiya are a Hindu community found in the state of Gujarat in India.

== Origin and present circumstances ==
The Gadhiya are a well known community found in Gujarat. They speak both the Gujarati dialect and standard Hindi. The Gadhiya are from Kadva Patidar community.

The Gadhiya were traditionally a Kathiyawad community. They are now a community of business people, and their settlements are found at the end of villages throughout Gujarat.

== See also ==
- Gawaria
