= Gadhia, Gujarat =

Village in Gujarat state, India

Gadhia is a village and former minor princely state on Saurashtra peninsula, in Gujarat, Western India.

== History ==
The petty state in Sorath prant was ruled by Kathi Chieftains. In 1901 it comprised Gadhia and a second village, with a population of 528, yielding 4,500 Rupees state revenue (1903–4, mostly from land), paying 295 Rupees tribute, to the Gaikwar Baroda State and Junagadh State.

== External links and sources ==
- Imperial Gazetteer, on dsal.uchicago.edu
