= Knapton railway station =

Disused railway station in North Yorkshire, England

Knapton
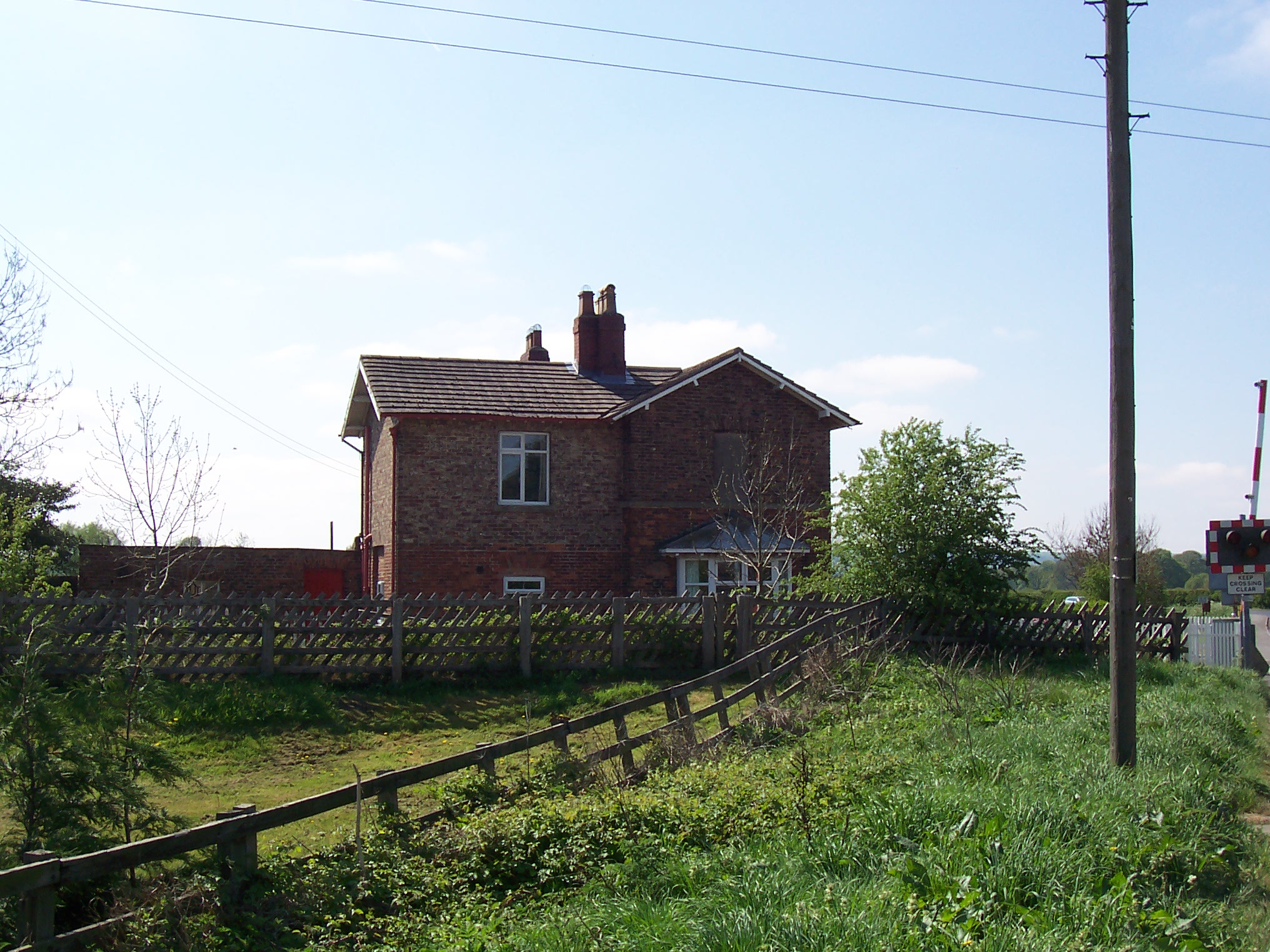
- The former station at Knapton

General information
- Location: East Knapton and West Knapton, North Yorkshire; England
- Coordinates: 54.178200°N 0.664000°W
- Grid reference: SE873766
- Platforms: 2

Other information
- Status: Disused

History
- Original company: York and North Midland Railway
- Pre-grouping: North Eastern Railway
- Post-grouping: London and North Eastern Railway

Key dates
- 5 July 1845: Opened
- 22 September 1930: Closed
Location

Knapton railway station was a minor railway station serving the villages of East Knapton and West Knapton in North Yorkshire, England. It was also the nearest railway station for Wintringham and Scampston, both of which are three miles from the station. Located on the York to Scarborough Line it was opened on 5 July 1845 by the York and North Midland Railway and closed to passengers on 22 September 1930.

== Early history (1845–1922) ==
The line was built by the York and North Midland Railway whose chairman was the "Railway King" George Hudson. Hudson envisaged Scarborough (the "Brighton of the North") as a major resort and for many years railway excursion traffic used the line which opened on 5 July 1845.

The former York-Scarborough turnpike crosses the line just west of the station and the goods yard was west of the crossing, the platforms to the east. Architect George Townsend Andrews designed the station building which included accommodation for the station master. The building was located on the up (towards York) side of the line. The station master's accommodation was extended in 1908.

Bradshaw's railway guide of 1 March 1850 shows, in table 79, three passenger services per weekday (Monday to Saturday) and one service each way on Sunday. These trains operated between York and Scarborough.

By 1854 the York and North Midland Railway had become part of the North Eastern Railway who operated services to the station until the end of 1922.

The signal box, located west of the crossing on the down side of the line, was bought into service in 1873.

The July 1922 Bradshaw's shows four trains each way on a weekday with a single train each way on the Sunday although these were timetabled to allow for a day at Scarborough.

== London and North Eastern Railway (1923–1947) ==
On 1 January 1923 the North Eastern Railway became part of the London and North Eastern Railway (LNER). With the introduction of bus services that served the centre of the local villages, passenger numbers declined and the local all stations train service was withdrawn from Knapton and other stations along the York to Scarborough line on 22 September 1930. The withdrawal of these slow stopping services released capacity on the line allowing more holiday and excursion trains to run to Scarborough and other Yorkshire Coast resorts.

Knapton, like many other minor stations along the route, retained its goods facilities.

== British Railways (1948–1979) ==
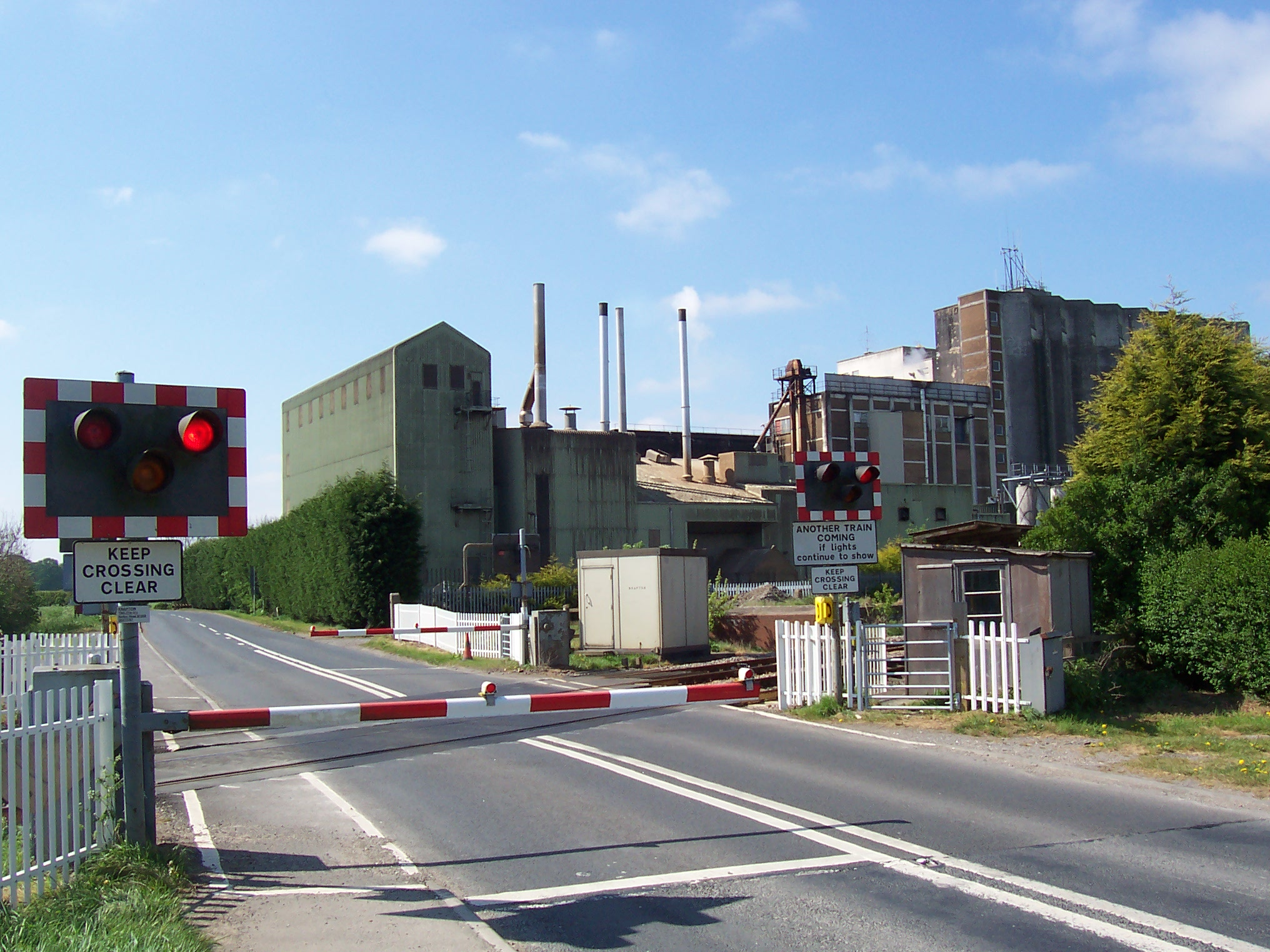
Knapton Maltings, built on the former goods yard

Following nationalisation of the railways on 1 January 1948, the goods yard and signal box fell under the auspices of the North Eastern Region of British Railways.

During the 1950s large silos were built adjacent to the goods yard to handle barley for onward travel by rail.

The goods yard closed to general goods traffic on 10 August 1964 although the siding for the Associated British Maltsters silos remained open until October 1979.

The signal box was closed on 11 December 1993 as part of a programme of signalling and level crossing upgrades.

== Level crossing crash ==
On 3 February 2009 a car was driven onto the level crossing which struck the rear end of a First TransPennine Express service from Liverpool Lime Street to Scarborough.

Preceding station	Historical railways	Following station
Rillington; Station closed; Line open	Y&NMR; York to Scarborough Line	Heslerton; Station closed; Line open
