= West Knapton =

Village in North Yorkshire, England

Coordinates: 54.16709°N 0.65738°W

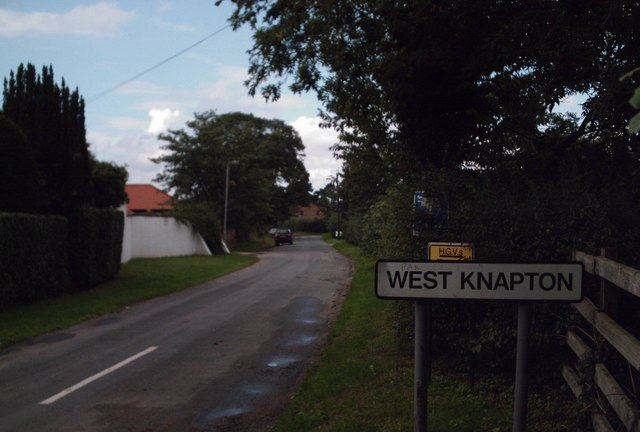
- Entering West Knapton

- Location within North Yorkshire
- OS grid reference: SE877754
- Civil parish: Scampston
- Unitary authority: North Yorkshire
- Ceremonial county: North Yorkshire
- Region: Yorkshire and the Humber
- Country: England
- Sovereign state: United Kingdom
- Post town: MALTON
- Postcode district: YO17
- Police: North Yorkshire
- Fire: North Yorkshire
- Ambulance: Yorkshire
- UK Parliament: Thirsk and Malton

West Knapton is a small village in the civil parish of Scampston, in North Yorkshire, England. It is situated on the edge of the Yorkshire Wolds at the foot of the North York Moors. The village is accessed by the A64.

There are approximately 32 houses in the village itself with several outlying farms and the 'Knapton Maltings', a small development of houses. Also, a few houses are by the railway.

The name Knapton possibly derives from the Old English Cnapatūn meaning 'Cnapa's settlement'. Alternatively, it could derive from cnafatūn meaning the 'servant boy's settlement'.

West Knapton hosts a gas-fired power station which is operated by Viking UK Gas Ltd on behalf of Scottish Power.

It also is host to Knapton Maltings, or Knapton Silo as it is locally known.

On the opposite side of the A64 to the village itself is the Wolds Way Caravan and Camping site.

Until 1974 West Knapton lay in the historic county boundaries of the East Riding of Yorkshire. The village was part of the Ryedale district between 1974 and 2023. It is now administered by North Yorkshire Council.

West Knapton was served by Knapton railway station on the York to Scarborough Line between 1845 and 1930. From 1866 to 1935 it was in Knapton parish when it became part of Scampston.

== See also ==
- Listed buildings in Scampston
