= Scampston Hall =

Grade II* listed country house in North Yorkshire, England

Coordinates: 54.1683°N 0.6769°W

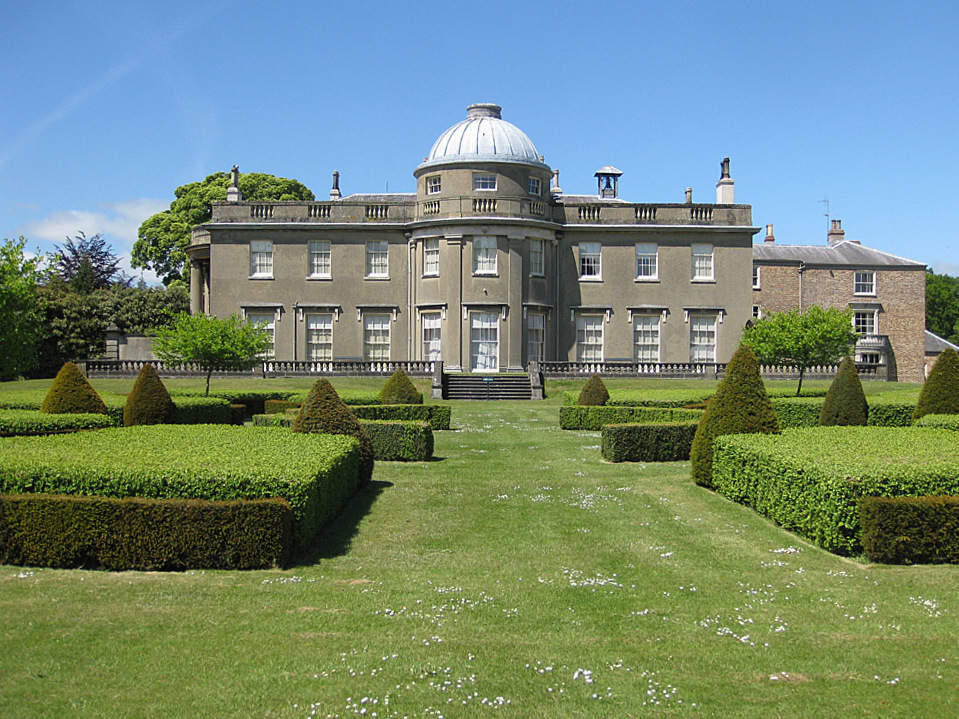
Scampston Hall, 2013

Scampston Hall is a Grade II* listed country house in North Yorkshire, England, with a serpentine park designed by Charles Bridgeman and Capability Brown. It is located on the north side of the A64 Leeds/Scarborough road, 4 miles (6 km) east of Malton, in Scampston village. The name of the village was referred to in various ways in ancient documents as: Scamestun, Skameston, Skameston, and Skampston, and was probably derived from a personal name.

== History ==
Scampston Hall was built in the late 1600s for William Hustler.

The estate was bought in the 1690s by Sir William St Quintin, 3rd Baronet, who was Receiver General for Ireland and Member of Parliament for Hull. The estate and title were inherited in 1723 by his nephew – also William – who was MP for Thirsk. He married wealthy heiress Rececca Thompson. With her money he was able to expand the estate and employ Capability Brown to landscape the park. The serpentine park of about 1.7 square kilometres was laid out first by Charles Bridgeman and later by Lancelot "Capability" Brown in 1772. It includes an unusual ionic "Bridge Building," concealing the end of a sheet of water and closing the view.

The baronetcy expired on the death of the last Sir William, the 5th Baronet, without issue in 1795. He was succeeded by his nephew, William Thomas Darby Esq., the son of Vice-Admiral George Darby, who assumed the surname and arms of St. Quintin in 1795. Between 1795 and 1801 William Thomas commissioned the architect Thomas Leverton to extensively remodel the hall in the Regency style, with fine Regency interiors. On his early death in 1805 it passed to his 7-year-old son William (1798–1859). William lived mainly in London but returned to Scampston when he was appointed High Sheriff of Yorkshire in 1850. He died childless in 1859 and was succeeded by his brother, Matthew Chitty Downes St. Quintin, a JP and colonel of the 17th Lancers. Matthew became mentally ill and spent much of what remained of the family fortune, dying in 1876. His son William Herbert St. Quintin, born in 1851, was a Justice of the Peace from 1875 to his death and an alderman from 1889. He was appointed High Sheriff of Yorkshire for 1899–1900 and Deputy Lieutenant of the East Riding. He was also a keen naturalist. On his death in 1933 the St. Quintin name died out and the estate passed into the hands of the Lestrange Malone family, as his daughter Margery had married Lt. Col. Edmund George S. L'Estrange Malone in 1910.

In 1959 Scampston passed to the Legard (or Le Gard) family (see Legard Baronets) as Colonel Malone's daughter Mary had married Sir Thomas Legard, 14th Baronet in 1935. The estate is now owned by their grandson Christopher, who was High Sheriff of North Yorkshire in 2018/19.

The park contained a large deer herd until World War II. Arthur F. Moody's Water-Fowl and Game-Birds in Captivity; Some Notes on Habits & Management (H. F. & G. Witherby, 326 High Holborn, London, W. C.) relates in detail the experience of the bird-keeper for Scampston's grounds in the years of William Herbert St. Quintin.

Scampston's refurbished Walled Garden, designed by Piet Oudolf, opened in 2004.

In October 2021, the building was one of 142 sites across England to receive part of a £35-million injection from the government's Culture Recovery Fund.

A BBC adaptation of An Inspector Calls by J.B. Priestley was filmed on location at Scampston Hall, and broadcast in September 2015.

The house is open by guided tour.

== Architecture ==
=== Scampston Hall ===
The house was largely remodelled between 1800 and 1803. It is built of orange-red brick, limewashed at the front and stuccoed elsewhere, and has a slate roof. There are two storeys, and the entrance front has seven bays, the middle bays bowed with a hemicycle of giant Tuscan columns in antis. Steps lead up to the doorway, and the windows are sashes. Above is a moulded eaves cornice and a parapet , partly balustraded. The garden front has nine bays and a central bow window with Tuscan pilasters, over which is an attic storey with a dome. The gateway has a segmental arch with a keystone and ball and pedestal finials. This is flanked by walls with moulded coping, and the end piers have similar finials.

=== Deer Park House ===
Deer Park House is a grade II* listed building in Scampston Park, built between 1767 and 1768. It is constructed of red brick, with sandstone dressings and a roof of pantile and tile. It has a square plan and later rear extensions. It consists of a two-storey canted central bay flanked by one-storey bays. In the centre is a doorway with an ogee-headed fanlight. The windows have Gothic glazing, those in the upper floor are sashes with pointed heads. Between the floors is a dentilled string course forming an eaves cornice over the side bays. At the top are embattled parapets with flat coping stones, shaped in the centre over a recessed blind trefoil. At the rear is a timber-cased cast iron pump.

=== Palladian Bridge ===
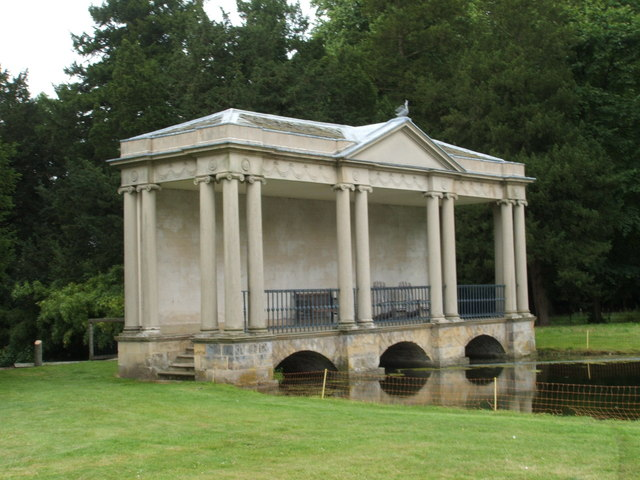
The bridge

The grade II*-listed bridge and garden pavilion were designed by Capability Brown and built around 1775. The bridge is in sandstone, and has three segmental arches of voussoirs between pilaster piers, and a moulded cornice. Standing on the bridge is the pavilion, in orange-red brick with timber columns and a hipped slate roof. There is a T-shaped plan, with three bays and a projecting rear bay. On the front are pairs of Ionic columns and a decorated frieze, above which a moulded dentiled cornice. Over the middle bay is a pediment with a duck acroterion. Along the front is a balustrade of cast iron railings. The rear bay contains a blind lunette window, and an impost band.

=== Stables ===
The grade II-listed stable buildings to the northeast of Scampston Hall were completed in 1780. They consist of a carriage house with a loft, stables, and a workshop, and are in mottled brick with roofs of red and blue pantile. The yard wall is in mottled brick with cambered sandstone coping, and the gates and gate posts are in cast iron. Between the gate posts is a segmental-arched overthrow with a spear finial. On the carriage house is a recessed date panel in a raised surround.

=== Gates and lodge ===
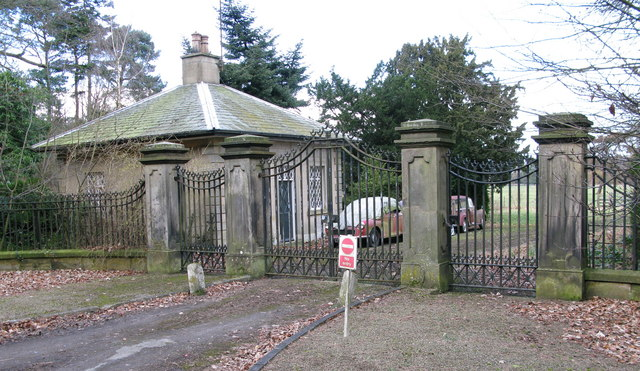
The gates and lodge

The gate piers and wall are built of sandstone. The piers have a square section, raised panels on two sides and sunk panels on the others, double cornices, and shallow pyramidal caps. The low flanking walls have chamfered coping and cast iron railings, and end piers. There are double carriage gates and flanking footgates in timber and cast iron. The lodge at the entry to the drive is in stuccoed sandstone on a plinth, with quoins, overhanging eaves and a pyramidal slate roof. There is one storey and three bays. The doorway has a fanlight, the windows are cross windows, and all the openings have raised surrounds. The gates and walls were built in the early 19th century and are collectively grade II listed, while the lodge was built around 1840 and is listed separately.

== See also ==
- Grade II* listed buildings in North Yorkshire (district)
- Listed buildings in Scampston
