= Keith Cochrane =

Scottish businessman (born 1965)

- Born: Keith Robertson Cochrane; 11 February 1965 (age 61); Edinburgh, Scotland
- Education: Glasgow University
- Occupation: Businessman
- Years active: 1986–present
- Title: CEO, Schenck Process
- Term: 2019–
- Predecessor: Andreas Evertz
- Children: 2

Keith Robertson Cochrane CBE FRSE (born 11 February 1965) is a Scottish businessman and former chief executive (CEO) of Weir Group, Stagecoach Group and Carillion plc (interim). In March 2019, he was appointed CEO of Schenck Process.

== Early life ==
Born in Edinburgh, Cochrane was educated at Dunblane High School, Perthshire, and studied accountancy at Glasgow University. He qualified as a chartered accountant with Arthur Andersen.

== Career ==
Cochrane was Group Finance Director of Stagecoach Group plc from 1996, becoming Group Chief Executive in 2000. He then joined ScottishPower plc in 2003 as Director of Group Financial Reporting, and from 2005 was Group Director of Finance. Cochrane became Honorary Treasurer of the Royal Scottish National Orchestra in September 2008.

On 2 November 2009 Cochrane became Group Chief Executive of Weir Group plc, having joined Weir as Group Finance Director in July 2006. He resigned as a director of Weir Group on 30 September 2016. Cochrane said that he was "looking for the next opportunity" and that the Weir Group had become "a bit samey".

In 2015, Cochrane was appointed as the lead "non-executive director” for the Scotland Office and Office of the Advocate General.

Cochrane was appointed to the board of Carillion plc on 2 July 2015 and on 10 July 2017 he became its Interim Chief Executive, taking over from Richard Howson. He remained in this position until the company went into voluntary liquidation on 15 January 2018. In the final report of the Parliamentary inquiry into the collapse of Carillion, published on 16 May 2018, the Carillion board was described as "either negligently ignorant of the rotten culture at Carillion or complicit in it." The report continued:

"Keith Cochrane was an inside appointment as interim Chief Executive, having served as a non-executive on the board that exhibited little challenge or insight. He was unable to convince investors of his ability to lead and rebuild the company. ... Non-executives are there to scrutinise executive management. They have a particularly vital role in challenging risk management and strategy and should act as a bulwark against reckless executives. Carillion’s NEDs were, however, unable to provide any remotely convincing evidence of their effective impact."

The report also recommended that the Insolvency Service should consider whether the former Carillion directors, including Cochrane, could be disqualified from acting as a director. In January 2021, the Insolvency Service said it would seek to ban eight former Carillion directors, including Cochrane, from holding senior boardroom positions. However, a trial due to start on 16 October 2023 was cancelled after the Insolvency Service decided it was not in the public interest to pursue Cochrane and four others.

In September 2017, Cochrane was appointed non-executive chairman of fracking company Third Energy Onshore. He resigned as a director in September 2018.

On 4 January 2018 Cochrane was appointed as Chairman of the Advisory Board of the German equipment manufacturer, Schenck Process Group.

In October 2018, Cochrane was appointed chairman of Peterhead-based engineer, Score Group.

On 1 March 2019, he took over as chief executive of Schenck Process.

== Honours ==
In March 2016, Cochrane was elected a Fellow of the Royal Society of Edinburgh, Scotland's National Academy for science and letters.

Cochrane was appointed Commander of the Order of the British Empire (CBE) in the 2016 Birthday Honours for services to business in Scotland.

== Personal life ==
Cochrane's interests include golf, gardening and watching Scotland play rugby.
