= Scampston =

Village and civil parish in North Yorkshire, England

Coordinates: 54°10′03″N 0°40′59″W

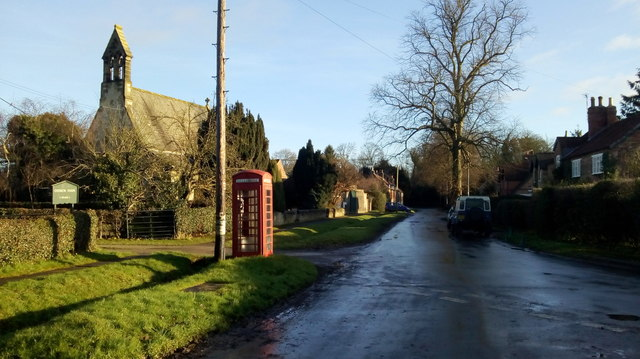

- Location within North Yorkshire
- Population: 313 (2011 census)
- OS grid reference: SE860754
- Unitary authority: North Yorkshire
- Ceremonial county: North Yorkshire
- Region: Yorkshire and the Humber
- Country: England
- Sovereign state: United Kingdom
- Post town: MALTON
- Postcode district: YO17
- Dialling code: 01944
- Police: North Yorkshire
- Fire: North Yorkshire
- Ambulance: Yorkshire
- UK Parliament: Thirsk and Malton

Scampston is a village and civil parish in North Yorkshire, England. It lies close to the A64 road, approximately 3 miles (4.8 km) east of Malton. The parish includes the hamlets of East Knapton and West Knapton. In 2011 the parish had a population of 313.

Until 1974, the village lay in the historic county boundaries of the East Riding of Yorkshire. From 1974 to 2023 it was part of the district of Ryedale, it is now administered by the unitary North Yorkshire Council.

The village has a bakery and coffee shop.

Scampston Hall is also located in the village. Scampston's Lodge Park is one of the finest holiday lodge parks in the North of England. Set within the beautiful parkland of Scampston Hall.

Scampston whose name was variously written in ancient documents, Scamestun, Skameston, Skameston, and Skampston, and which was probably derived from a personal name. On 1 April 1935 the parish of Knapton was abolished and merged with Scampston.

Scampston was the birthplace of William Latimer, 4th Baron Latimer, the first member of the British Parliament to be impeached, in 1376.

== See also ==
- Listed buildings in Scampston
