= Jitesh Gadhia, Baron Gadhia =

British investment banker and member of the House of Lords

The Right Honourable The Lord Gadhia
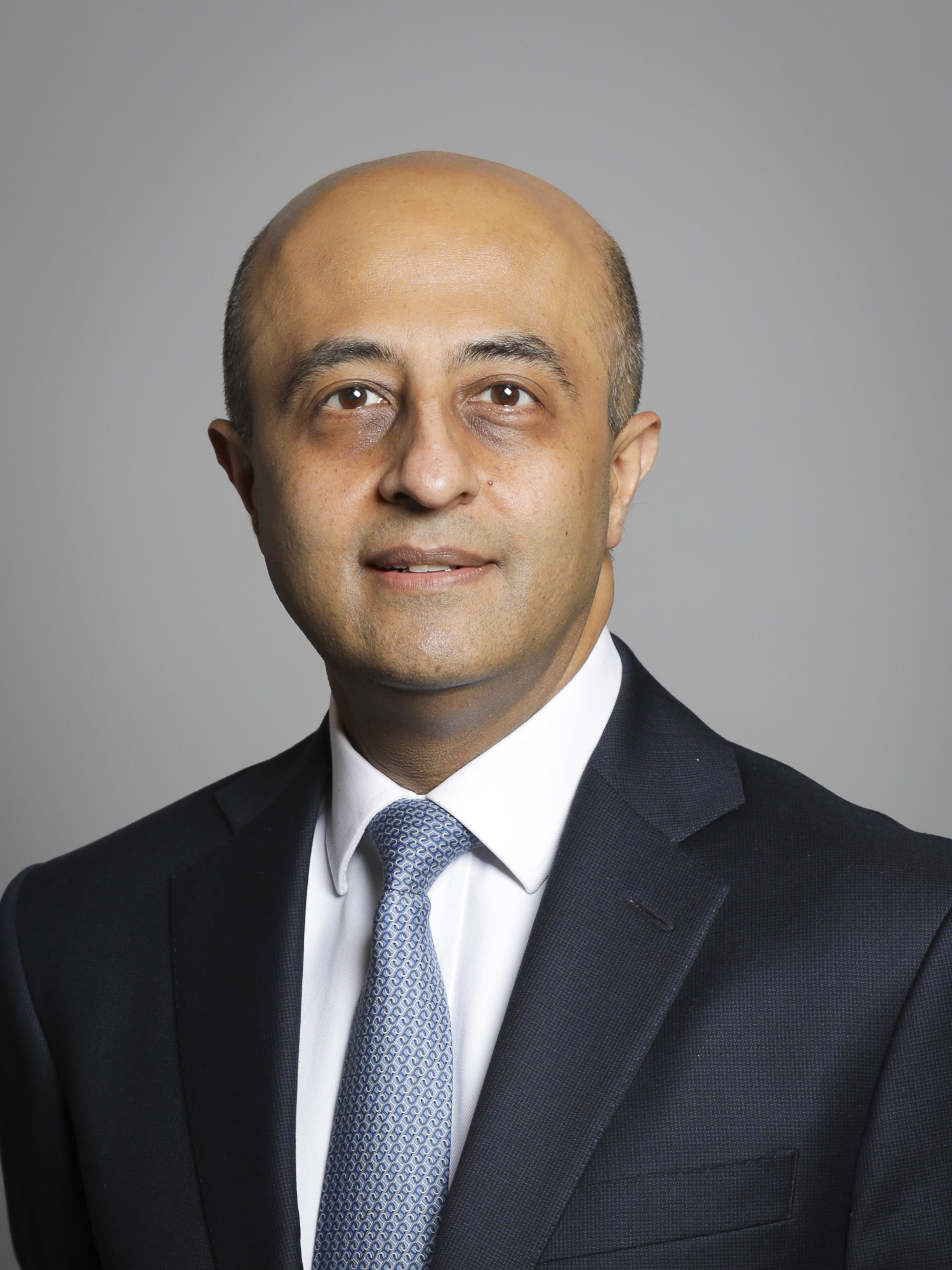

Member of the House of Lords
- Lord Temporal
- Life peerage 31 August 2016

Personal details
- Born: 27 May 1971 (age 55)
- Party: None (non-affiliated)
- Other political affiliations: Conservative Party (2016–2017)

Jitesh Kishorekumar Gadhia, Baron Gadhia (born 27 May 1971) is a British investment banker, Conservative Party donor and member of the House of Lords. A member of the Leader's Group of high-value donors, he was described by The Herald as a member of David Cameron's "inner circle".

== Education and career ==
Gadhia was a pupil at Gayton High Comprehensive School (now Harrow High School) from 1982 to 1986, before going on to study economics at Fitzwilliam College, Cambridge, and the London Business School, where he was a Sloan Fellow.

Gadhia is a senior managing director at The Blackstone Group, a US private equity firm. Prior to this, he worked for Barclays, ABN AMRO, and Barings Bank, which collapsed while he worked there. He also sits on the board of UK Financial Investments. Gadhia was a trustee of Nesta, and has written for The Daily Telegraph.

In September 2017, Gadhia was appointed a non-executive director of fracking company Third Energy, though questions were raised about a potential conflict of interest when the company was late publishing its annual results, amid concerns about its financial resilience and ability to fund clean-up costs. Gadhia resigned as a director in September 2018.

== Political support ==
He has donated at least £225,000 to the Conservative Party, and another £18,000 to the Conservative Friends of India. He has also donated at least £25,000 to the Liberal Democrats in Scotland.

He was involved in the cash for access scandal in 2014, along with James Stunt (billionaire art dealer, gambling and shipping tycoon) and Alexander Temerko (Russian energy tycoon), and approximately 40 others.

In August 2016 it was announced that he was to be made a life peer in as part of Cameron's Resignation Honours list. In the afternoon of 31 August he was created Baron Gadhia, of Northwood in the County of Middlesex. From 31 August 2016 to 1 February 2017, he sat in the House of Lords as a Conservative peer. Since 2 February 2017, he has sat as a non-affiliated member.

In October 2022, he was appointed to the Court of Directors of the Bank of England.

Orders of precedence in the United Kingdom
Preceded by The Lord Price	Gentlemen; Baron Gadhia	Followed by The Lord McInnes of Kilwinning
