= Marishes =

Civil parish in North Yorkshire, England

Coordinates: 54.190°N 0.753°W

- Civil parish
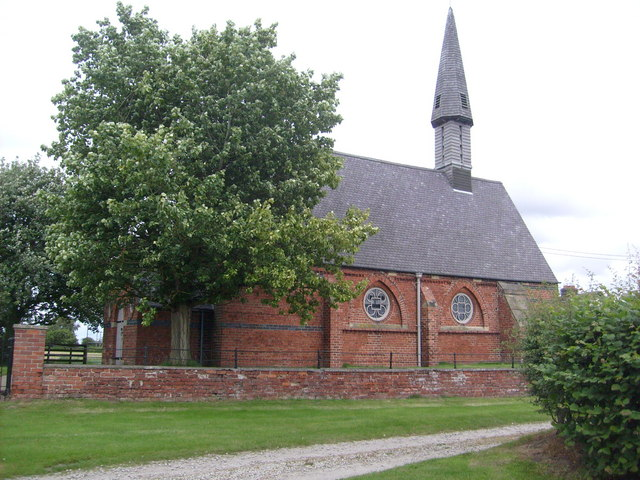
- The Anglican church at Low Marishes

- Location within North Yorkshire
- Population: 140 (2015) NYCC
- OS grid reference: SE815774
- Unitary authority: North Yorkshire
- Ceremonial county: North Yorkshire
- Region: Yorkshire and the Humber
- Country: England
- Sovereign state: United Kingdom
- Post town: MALTON
- Postcode district: YO17
- Dialling code: 01653
- Police: North Yorkshire
- Fire: North Yorkshire
- Ambulance: Yorkshire
- UK Parliament: Thirsk and Malton

Marishes is a civil parish in North Yorkshire, England. The parish has an area of some 2,960 acres (1,199 hectares), and lies between Malton and Pickering in the low-lying Vale of Pickering. Besides several farms, there are two hamlets: High Marishes and Low Marishes.

Whilst the main occupation of the residents in the parish is agricultural in nature, the area is known for its onshore gas field. In 2015, the population of the parish was estimated to be 140.

== History ==
Marishes parish occupies a swathe of low-lying land, bordered on three sides by watercourses; the River Derwent to the east, the Costa Beck to the west and the River Rye to the south. The name derives from the Old Norse Mersc, meaning The Marshes. The land was mostly marsh until it was drained. (Note: Various parts of the parish had names prefixed with personal names, but all ending in a variant of Mersc; Aschilesmares, Aschelesmere, Chiluesmares, Chiluesmarsc, Kilverdesmersh, Culverthesmersch, Maxudesmares, and Maxudesmersc.) The area was mentioned in the Domesday Book as Loft Marishes, but no population was recorded. At the Dissolution, Loft Marishes/Loftmarish belonged to Rievaulx Abbey (along with Deerholme, a named place in the modern parish). It was last mentioned in 1649.

The size of the parish has changed over time; in 1872 it was 2,289 acres (926 ha), and by 1890, it was 2,858 acres (1,157 ha). At the 1901 census it covered 2,335 acres (945 ha), and at the 2011 census it was 2,960 acres (1,199 ha). A Wesleyan chapel was erected in 1848, and an Anglican church in 1863. St Francis' Church, Low Marishes is still a place of worship (as a chapel-of-ease) in the Benefice of Pickering with Lockton and Levisham. The structure is a grade II listed building and is noted for its unusual spire, being prominent in the flat landscape. In 2004, an application was made to allow for automatic licensing for weddings, and it was found that the church had been running for 140 years without a licence for public worship. It was at this time that the dedication to St Francis was approved.

In 1893, the parish was described as a "township and chapelry in the Whitby Division of the [North] Riding." The school, which had been built in 1830, had an enrolment of 23 pupils, but could accommodate 45. An ecclesiastical parish profile in 2020, found that most of the current residents are employed in agriculture, and are scattered across the parish, with almost 20 houses in High Marishes, and 16 dwellings in Low Marishes.

The parish is bisected by the A169 road, which connects Malton in the south, with Pickering in the north. The parish used to have a railway station on the Malton to Pickering line, but this closed in March 1965. The station was known as Marishes Road, and was on the road between the A169 and Thornton-le-Dale, outside of both Marishes hamlets. Public transport is now provided on the A169 by the Coastliner buses (number 840) between Leeds, York and Pickering.

=== Gas field ===
Marishes parish sits atop a gas field, which produces hydrocarbons for a gas-fired power station at East Knapton. Drilling in the area was first undertaken in 1937, and gas fields under the parish were first discovered in 1988. Production from Marishes started in 1998. The gas is from a field known as the Kirkham Abbey Formation, which is known to be heavy with hydrogen sulphide (sour gas).

== Governance ==
Historically in the wapentake of Pickering Lythe, and in the ecclesiastical parish of Pickering, the parish is roughly 3 miles (4.8 km) south of Pickering and some 5 miles (8 km) north of Malton. The parish was part of the Ryedale district between 1974 and 2023. It is now administered by North Yorkshire Council.

The parish forms part of the Thirsk and Malton constituency for elections to the UK parliament.

In the 2001 census, the population of the parish was 123, which had risen to 132 at the 2011 census. In 2015, North Yorkshire County Council estimated the population of the parish to be 140.

Population of Marishes 1801–2015
1801	1811	1821	1831	1841	1851	1861	1871	1881	1891	1901	1911	1921	1931	1951	1961	1971	2001	2011	2015
200	193	210	207	243	294	287	304	270	199	204	244	271	246	193	165	120	123	132	140

== See also ==
- Listed buildings in Marishes
