= Lockton gas field =

Natural gas field in North Yorkshire, England

Coordinates: 54.286°N 0.565°W

The Lockton natural gas field, also known as the Ebberston Moor natural gas field, is a natural gas field under the North York Moors National Park in the United Kingdom.

== Discovery and opening ==
The field was discovered by the Home Oil Company of Canada in 1966. It is located at a depth of 5,700 ft (1,700 m) in Middle Magnesian Limestone. The gas is about 94% methane, 3% inert gas with traces of hydrogen sulphide. Recoverable reserves were initially estimated to be 250 billion cubic feet (7 billion m^{3}). In an agreement between the Gas Council and Home Oil/Gas Council Exploration provision was to have been made to use the Lockton gas field for the seasonal storage of natural gas.

To minimise development within the national park area only the gas wells, a field gathering station and underground pipelines were located in the Park. Gas from the gathering station was piped at 1,075 psi (74 bar) via an 18-inch (460 mm) diameter underground pipeline nine miles (14 km) to a treatment plant in Outgang Lane on the outskirts of Pickering. Construction of the plant at Pickering started in May 1969 and was operational by August 1971. The total cost of the facilities was £4–£8 million. It employed about 24 people.

== Operation ==
Hot water from the treatment plant was circulated in small-bore pipes alongside the pipeline to reduce heat losses and potential hydrate formation, an ice-like substance that can cause blockages. At the Pickering treatment plant raw gas was routed through a slug catcher and inlet separator to remove liquid hydrocarbons and water. Gas flowed to two parallel vetrocoke absorbers where it was washed with a counter-current aqueous solution of soda ash and arsenic compounds to convert the hydrogen sulphide to elemental sulphur. Gas then flowed to a hydrocarbon recovery unit where it was chilled to remove further liquid hydrocarbons, the dry sulphur-free gas passed through a British Gas metering station to Feeder No. 6 of the National Transmission System which passes through Pickering. The sulphur-rich solution from the absorbers was routed to oxidiser regenerators where air was bubbled through the solution to remove the sulphur in the form of a froth. The froth was dried in a rotary vacuum filter and heated in an autoclave to allow removal of impurities prior to being stored in tanks at about 130 °C from where it was removed by heated road tanker. The regenerated absorber solution from the oxidisers, together with recovered solution from the vacuum filters, was returned for reuse in the vetrocoke absorbers. Hydrocarbon liquids were routed to condensate stabilizers and then to storage tanks for removal by road tanker.

== Production, closure and redevelopment ==
The original agreement between Home Oil and British Gas was a 15-year contract valued at £27 million for the delivery of 75 million cubic feet (2.1 million cubic metres) per day of gas at standard conditions with a maximum flow of 100 million ft^{3} (2.8 million m^{3}) per day. By 1974 aquifer water ingress into the gas reservoir had significantly reduced gas production to about 1 million ft^{3} (28 thousand m^{3}) per day. The production and gas treatment facility was permanently shut down in October 1974. Over three years it had produced 11.3 billion ft^{3} (320 million m^{3}) at standard conditions, only 4.5% of the estimated recoverable reserves.

The Lockton gas field is now known as Ebberston Moor. It is licensed to Third Energy. In 2014 Third Energy announced a joint venture with Moorland Energy Limited (MEL) to develop the Ebberston Moor South development. Gas from the existing Ebberston Moor South well will be transported via a new 14-km pipeline to the Knapton Generating Station.
