= East Knapton =

Village in North Yorkshire, England

Coordinates: 54°10′20″N 0°39′00″W

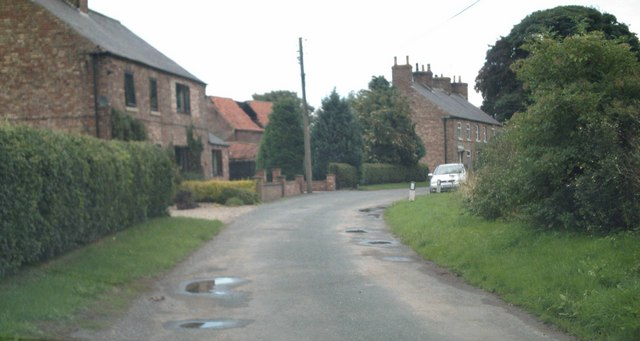
- East Knapton

- Location within North Yorkshire
- OS grid reference: SE882759
- Civil parish: Scampston
- Unitary authority: North Yorkshire
- Ceremonial county: North Yorkshire
- Region: Yorkshire and the Humber
- Country: England
- Sovereign state: United Kingdom
- Post town: MALTON
- Postcode district: YO13 9
- Dialling code: 01944
- Police: North Yorkshire
- Fire: North Yorkshire
- Ambulance: Yorkshire
- UK Parliament: Thirsk and Malton

East Knapton is a village in the civil parish of Scampston, in North Yorkshire, England.

== Geography ==
It is just north of the A64 near the junction with the B1258. The York to Scarborough railway line is just north of the village and runs close to the power station. From 1845 until 1930, there was a railway station. The village is in the Rillington ward which has a combined population of 1,734. On the other side of the A64 is Knapton Wood.

== History ==
The name Knapton possibly derives from the Old English Cnapatūn meaning 'Cnapa's settlement'. Alternatively, it could derive from cnafatūn meaning the 'servant boy's settlement'.

From 1866 to 1935 it was in Knapton parish when it became part of Scampston. Until 1974 the village lay in the historic county boundaries of the East Riding of Yorkshire. From 1974 to 2023 it was part of the district of Ryedale, it is now administered by the unitary North Yorkshire Council.

== Knapton Generating Station ==
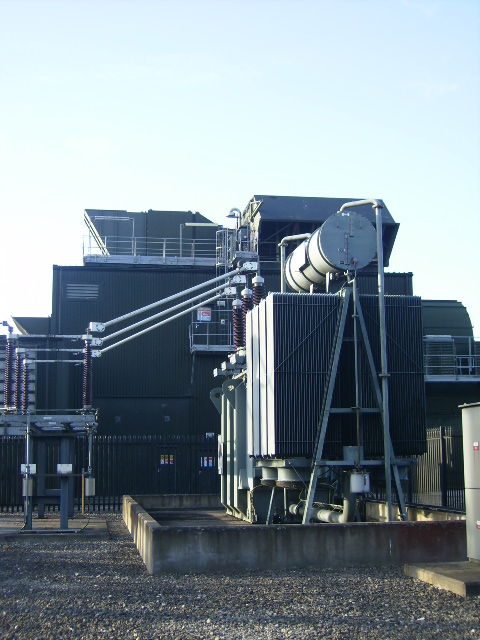
Knapton Power Station

This power station was opened in 1995 by Amy Glover, 8 years old. It has a 42 MWe General Electric LM6000 open cycle gas turbine with a thermal efficiency of 38%. The development was the subject of a public inquiry in 1992, formal consent was given by the Department of Trade and Industry and the Department of the Environment in March 1993. In August 2006, Scottish Power sold the power station to the RGS Energy Ltd, a subsidiary of UK Energy Systems Ltd (a holding company owned by US Energy Systems of Avon, Connecticut) for £15.5 million. The plant uses about 12,000 BTU per kWh of electricity, which is inefficient to more modern CCGT plants which use about 6,500 BTU per kWh of electricity.

Natural gas was discovered in Ryedale in 1970. The gas for the power station does not come from the National Transmission System but local gas fields found in Permian limestone and carboniferous sandstone at 5,000-foot depth. The Permian reservoir gas contains small quantities of hydrogen sulphide (less than 0.1% by weight). At the Knapton site the combined gas flow from the well sites passes to a separator where liquids are removed. It then passes to a sulphur removal facility before being sent to the gas turbine. The removed liquids are sent to a liquids injection well which returns them to the underground reservoir. The Knapton site also has a ground flare to burn waste gases.

In 2014 Third Energy announced a joint venture with Moorland Energy Limited (MEL) to develop the Ebberston Moor South development. Gas from the existing Ebberston Moor South well will be transported via a new 14-km pipeline to the Knapton Generating Station.

Knapton Generating Station was taken offline in 2019 and was subsequently dismantled. There are plans to install a 56 MWh battery on the site.

== Ryedale gas fields ==
See main article Ryedale gas fields

The Ryedale gas fields, also known as the Vale of Pickering gas fields, comprise four onshore gas producing fields in North Yorkshire, United Kingdom. The fields were discovered between 1970 and 1991. From 1995 to 2019 the gas was used as fuel for the gas-turbine driven Knapton power station. Production of gas from the fields was suspended in 2020.

== See also ==
- Listed buildings in Scampston
