= Ebenezer Church =

Ebenezer Church may refer to:

== Australia ==
- Ebenezer Church (Australia)

== Sierra Leone ==
- Ebenezer Methodist Church

== United Kingdom ==
- Ebenezer, Llanelli, Wales
- Ebenezer Methodist Chapel, East Ayton, North Yorkshire
- Ebenezer Strict Baptist Chapel, Richmond, London

== United States ==
- Ebenezer Spanish-English;Ministerios Ebenezer, California
- Ebenezer Lutheran Church, California
- Ebenezer African Methodist Episcopal Church and School, Georgia
- Ebenezer Methodist Episcopal Chapel and Cemetery, Illinois
- Ebenezer African Methodist Episcopal Church (Baltimore, Maryland), a Baltimore City Landmark
- Ebenezer Academy, Bethany Presbyterian Church and Cemetery, North Carolina
- Ebenezer Methodist Church (Bells, North Carolina)
- Ebenezer Lutheran Chapel, South Carolina
- Old Ebenezer Church, South Carolina
- Ebenezer Methodist Church, Earnest Farms Historic District, Tennessee
- Ebenezer Missionary Baptist Church (Chicago), Illinois

== See also ==
- Ebenezer (disambiguation)
- Ebenezer Baptist Church (disambiguation)
- Ebenezer Chapel (disambiguation)
- Ebenezer Presbyterian Church (disambiguation)
- Battle of Ebenezer Church (1865), Plantersville, Alabama, United States
- Ebenezer (hymn)
- Ebenezer Academy, South Carolina, United States
- Ebenezer Bible College and Seminary, Philippines
