= Ebenezer Chapel =

Ebenezer Chapel may refer to:

== United Kingdom ==
=== England ===
- Ebenezer Particular Baptist Chapel, Hastings, East Sussex
- Ebenezer Chapel, Heathfield, East Sussex
- Ebenezer Chapel, Melksham, Wiltshire
- Ebenezer Strict Baptist Chapel, Richmond, London

=== Wales ===
- Ebenezer Chapel, Aberavon, Neath Port Talbot
- Ebeneser Chapel, Ammanford, Carmarthenshire
- Ebenezer Baptist Chapel, Llandovery, Carmarthenshire
- Ebenezer Chapel, Llanelli, Carmarthenshire
- Ebenezer Chapel, Trecynon, Rhondda Cynon Taf

== United States ==
- Ebenezer Chapel (Marmet, West Virginia)

== See also ==
- Ebenezer (disambiguation)
- Ebenezer Church (disambiguation)
