= Ebenezer Baptist Church (disambiguation) =

Ebenezer Baptist Church is a church in Atlanta, Georgia, U.S., known for its ties to Dr. Martin Luther King, Jr.

Ebenezer Baptist Church may also refer to:

== United States ==
=== Alabama ===
- Ebenezer Missionary Baptist Church (Auburn, Alabama)
- First Ebenezer Baptist Church, Birmingham, Alabama

=== Illinois ===
- Ebenezer Missionary Baptist Church (Chicago), Illinois, where gospel music choirs were first organized and Bo Diddley learned music

=== Kansas ===
- Ebenezer Baptist Church (Atchison, Kansas), U.S.

=== Virginia ===
- Ebenezer Baptist Church (Richmond, Virginia), U.S.
- Ebenezer Baptist Churches, Bloomfield, Virginia, U.S.

== United Kingdom ==
- Ebenezer Baptist Chapel, Llandovery, Wales
- Ebenezer, Ammanford, Wales
- Ebenezer Particular Baptist Chapel, Hastings, England
- Ebenezer Chapel, Heathfield, England
