= St Giles' Church, Bielby =

Church in Bielby, East Riding of Yorkshire, England

Coordinates: 53.8837°N 0.8017°W

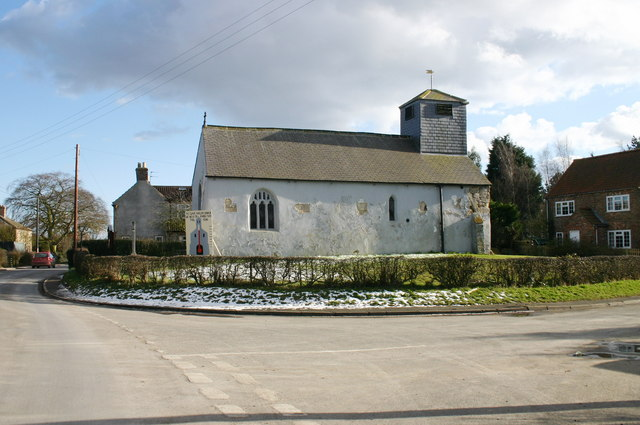
The church in 2006, before removal of the whitewash

St Giles' Church is the parish church of Bielby, a village in the East Riding of Yorkshire, in England.

The church was built in the late 12th century and initially consisted of a nave and chancel. A north aisle was added in the 13th century. The roof, and east and south walls, were reconstructed in 1792, using some of the old material. Temple Moore planned to restored the church in the 19th century, but this did not go ahead. The building was grade II* listed in 1967. Between 2005 and 2015 the external walls were restored, the work including removing white paint.

The church has been altered and extended through the centuries, and was partly rebuilt in 1792 reusing older material. It is built of stone, with slate roofs. The church consists of a continuous nave and chancel, and has a west bellcote with louvres and a pyramidal roof. Two of the windows incorporate 12th-century beakheads as keystones, and the rebuilt west door incoporates 12th-century chevron and beakhead ornament. Inside, there are 19th-century box pews and a pulpit, and an octagonal font of similar date.

== See also ==
- Grade II* listed buildings in the East Riding of Yorkshire
- Listed buildings in Bielby
