= Crossgates, North Yorkshire =

Village in North Yorkshire, England

Coordinates: 54.241°N 0.422°W

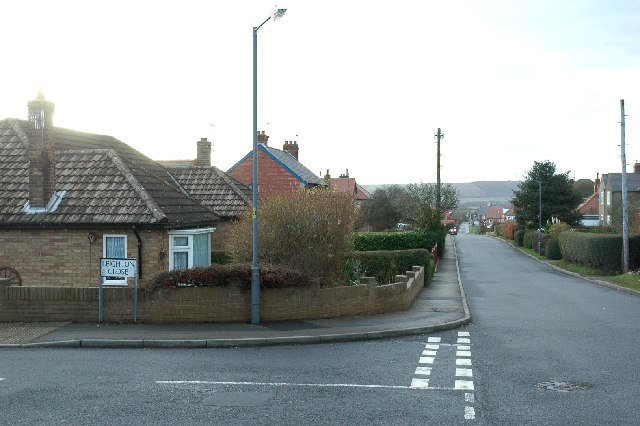
Crab Lane, a street in Crossgates

Crossgates is a village in the county of North Yorkshire, England, situated between Seamer to the west and Eastfield to the east separating the A64 and the B1261 roads which intersect there. Seamer railway station is situated in Crossgates.

The village was built after the Second World War. New houses were built in the village in 2000. Nearby points of interest include Star Carr, a Mesolithic archaeological site.

Towns nearby include Scarborough and Filey. Crossgates is considered a part of Seamer. From 1974 to 2023 it was part of the Borough of Scarborough, it is now administered by the unitary North Yorkshire Council.

Crossgates is home to a disused limestone quarry.
