= Beakhead (architecture) =

Architectural motif used in Norman buildings

Tympanum over the south doorway, Austerfield church

A beakhead (or beak-head), is a carved stone head which is usually adorned on an archway in a church with the beak of the animal (normally a bird) pecking the roll moulding of the arch. Beakheads are Norman in origin and exist in England, France, Ireland, and Northern Spain. The adornment has been copied and has been used in more modern day structures like railway tunnel portals.

== History ==
Chauvigny Saint-Pierre Aigle et Homme

Beakheads, which began appearing in Norman architecture c. 1140, are described as "birds' faces looking straight out and seeming to grip the stone moulding with their beaks." The beakheads were normally carved with their beaks biting into the roll-moulding on archways in churches. By 1150, multi–faced beakheads were adorning arches and the design had progressed from only bird faces to all manner of animals including human. Human heads were normally carved with the neck, chin, or beard on the roll moulding rather than biting it. In England, there are over 120 churches with beakheads present, but they are most frequent in the Yorkshire region, although a similar-sized area as the Yorkshire region around Oxford, but consisting of several counties, has a similar number of churches with beakheads. Within a 40 miles (64 km) radius of both York and Oxford, there are over 40 and 30 churches respectively that are adorned with beakheads. The Yorkshire region alone accounts for over a third of the examples in England, although between the two main areas there are more examples in Nottinghamshire and Derbyshire. Norman Beakheads are to be found in England, Ireland, France and Spain, with one example in Scotland, whilst none are found in Wales.

The beakhead is "extremely rare" in the South East of England, meaning that the style most likely did not originate from the Christian centres at Canterbury, Rochester and Winchester. Whilst the beakheads have been considered to be merely decorative objects, some scholars have interpreted the beakheads to be "..convey[ing] specific iconographic concepts." On the columns inside the Church of Saint-Pierre de Chauvigny are "anthropophagus monsters" and beakheads which hold small figures; those held by the beakheads are deemed to have failed the Last Judgment. One explanation is that as the sculptures appeared not only in great cathedrals and abbeys, but also in many village churches in rural England, it was a way to inform the local populous about being un-Christian, as they were unable to read the liturgy, but could see the damnation that awaited them if they strayed from the precepts of the religion.

The oldest known examples of Norman beakheads are in the Church of St. Peter of Marestay in Matha, France, but they were "voraciously employed" at Reading Abbey and Old Sarum Cathedral. A large proportion of beakheads date to the second-half of the 12th-century, especially those in England. Many examples such as at Charney Bassett in Wiltshire, England, and at Puerta de las Platerias at Santiago de Compostela, Spain, show a griffin being trampled by some other object or figure. At Santiago de Compostela the figure is thought to be Jesus, whereas the griffin is thought to represent the devil in these displays. Beakheads do appear in Normandy, but they are nowhere near as prolific as they are in England.

The French term for a beakhead is têtes plates, whereas the word beakhead in English is a nineteenth-century term describing a large birds' head which has a beak which is biting or digging into something.

== Locations ==
Beakheads appear on religious buildings within the Norman sphere of influence. Modern day Romanesque influenced examples exist, such as the western portal of Beacon Hill Tunnel in Halifax, West Yorkshire, England. The Church of St James at Boroughbridge dates from 1852, but has some Norman artefacts included within the fabric of the church, including one arch with beakheads.

=== England ===
Yorkshire

(listed alphabetically by place)

- St John the Baptist Church, Adel
- St Mary's Church, Alne
- St Helen's Church, Amotherby
- St Hilda's Church, Ampleforth
- Church of St Helena, Austerfield
- All Hallows Church, Bardsey
- St Michael's Church, Barton-le-Street
- Church of St Giles, Bielby
- St Mary's Church, Birkin
- Church of St Edith, Bishop Wilton
- Church of St James Boroughbridge
- Church of St Andrew, Bugthorpe
- Easby Abbey
- St John the Baptist's Church, East Ayton
- Church of St Peter, Edlington
- Church of St Mary, Etton
- Church of St Martin, Fangfoss
- St Felix's Church, Felixkirk
- Church of St Cuthbert, Fishlake
- All Saints' Church, Foston
- St Mary's Church, Goldsborough
- St John the Baptist Church, Healaugh
- Church of All Saints, Helmsley
- Church of St Peter, Hutton Cranswick
- Church of All Saints, Kilnwick
- Church of St Helen, Kilnwick Percy
- Church of St Mary, Kirkburn
- St Leonard & Mary, Malton
- Church of St Helen, Nunburnholme
- St Peter's Church, Osmotherley
- St Mary's Church, Riccall
- Church of St Michael, Rossington
- St Martin's Church, Seamer, Scarborough
- St Hilda's Church, Sherburn
- Church of All Saints, Shiptonthorpe
- Church of St Leonard, Skerne
- St Oswald's Church, Sowerby
- Church of All Saints, Spofforth
- All Saints' Church, Thorp Arch
- Church of St Nicholas, Wetwang
- St Denys's Church, York
- St Margaret's Church, York

Others

(listed alphabetically by place, not county)

- Church of St Bartholomew, Aldsworth, Gloucestershire
- Church of Saint Nicholas, Asthall, Oxfordshire
- Church of St John, Ault Hucknall, Derbyshire
- Church of Saint Luke and Saint Mark, Avington, Berkshire
- All Saints' Church, Bakewell, Derbyshire
- St Mary's Church, Barnsley, Gloucestershire
- St Mary's Church, Barton Bendish, Norfolk
- Church of St Mary Magdalene, Belmont, County Durham
- Church of St John, Bishopsteignton, Devon
- Church of St Mary and St Benedict, Buckland Brewer, Devon
- All Saints Church, Buncton, West Sussex
- St Michael's Church, Burgh by Sands, Lancashire
- Church of St Peter, Charney Bassett, Wiltshire
- Church of St James, Coln St. Dennis, Gloucestershire
- Church of All Saints, Earls Barton, Northamptonshire
- Church of the Holy Trinity, Eggleston, County Durham
- Church of St John the Evangelist, Elkstone, Gloucestershire
- Church of St John the Baptist, Elton, County Durham
- Church of St Andrew, Great Rollright, Oxfordshire
- Holy Trinity Church, Holdgate, Shropshire
- St Mary the Virgin, Iffley, Oxfordshire
- St James Church, Kilkhampton, Cornwall
- Church of St Mary and St David, Kilpeck, Herefordshire
- Church of St Michael, Kniveton, Derbyshire
- Church of St Laurence, Long Eaton, Derbyshire
- Church of All Saints, Lullington, Somerset
- Church of St Peter, Middle Rasen, Lincolnshire
- Church of St Morwenna and St John the Baptist, Morwenstow, Cornwall
- Church of St Cuthbert, Norham, Northumberland
- Norton Priory, Cheshire
- Church of All Saints, Pitsford, Northamptonshire
- Church of St John, Radclive, Buckinghamshire
- Church of St Mary, Roade, Northamptonshire
- St Bees Priory, Cumbria
- Steetley Chapel, Derbyshire
- Church of St Michael & All Angels, Stewkley, Buckinghamshire
- St Mary Magdalene's Church, Tortington, Sussex
- Church of St Mary the Virgin, Tutbury, Staffordshire
- Church of St Mary, Twyford, Buckinghamshire
- Church of St Candida and Holy Cross, Dorset
- Church of St Peter, Windrush, Gloucestershire

=== Scotland ===
- Kelso Abbey. The abbey at Kelso was built in 1128, some time before the popularisation of beakheads. It is thought those that adorn the abbey were added in the middle of the 12th century.

=== Ireland ===
- Dysert O'Dea Monastery, County Clare
- The Nuns' Church, Clonmacnoise, County Offaly

=== France ===
- Church of Saint–Pierre de Chauvigny

=== Modern replications ===
The following are church buildings which have beakheads on at least one arch, but are not Norman–built churches.

- St John's Cathedral, Parramatta, Sydney, Australia.
- Church of All Saints, Aughton, replica beakheads on c. 19th-century arch
- All Saints Church, Easington, North Yorkshire, England.
