= Bielby Mill =

Building in Bielby, East Riding of Yorkshire, England

Coordinates: 53.8859°N 0.8037°W

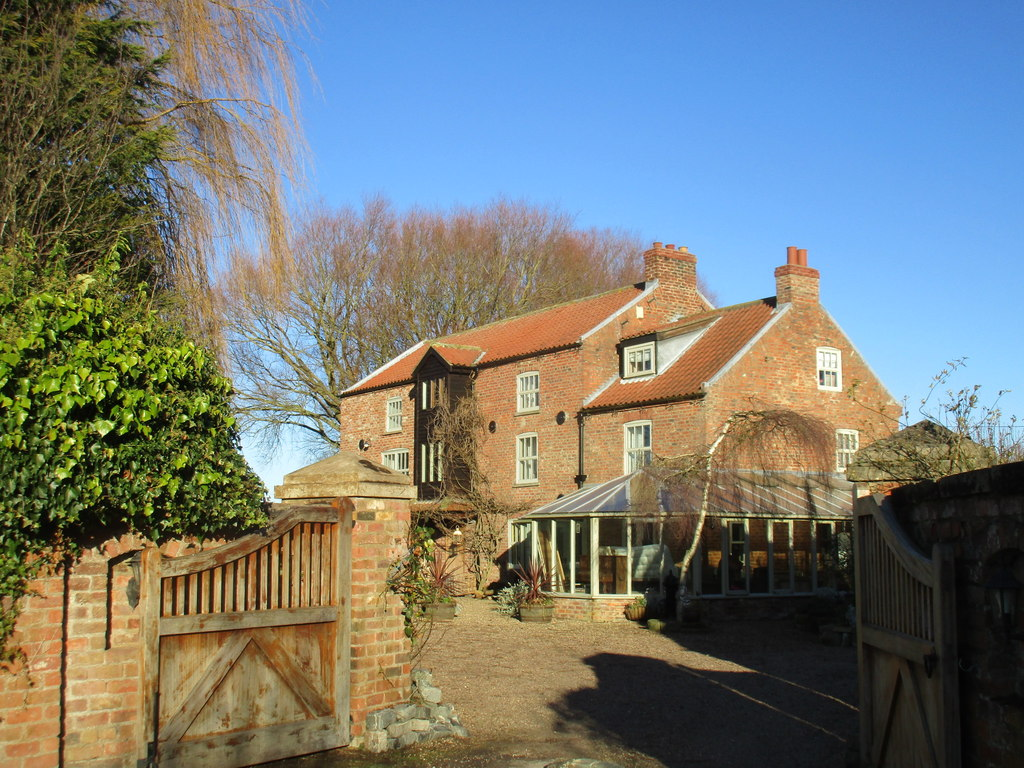
The building, in 2017

Bielby Mill is a historic building in Bielby, a village in the East Riding of Yorkshire, in England.

The watermill and adjacent house were constructed in the late 18th century. The mill lies on the Bielby Brook, and was used to grind corn. A porch was added in the 20th century, and the building was grade II listed in 1986. By 2008, the mill had been converted into a house, with six bedrooms, five reception rooms, and four bathrooms.

The watermill and attached house are built of red brick, with pantile roofs and tumbled-in brickwork to the gables. The mill has three storeys and four bays. The house to the right has two storeys and one bay. Both parts contain openings and sash windows with segmental heads, and the house has a raking dormer.

== See also ==
- Listed buildings in Bielby
