= Ebenezer =

Ebenezer may refer to:

== Bible ==
- Eben-Ezer, a place mentioned in the Books of Samuel

== People ==
- Ebenezer (given name), a male given name
- Ebenezer Scrooge, fictional character in A Christmas Carol

== Places ==
=== Australia ===
- Ebenezer, New South Wales, a suburb
- Ebenezer, Queensland, a locality in the City of Ipswich
- Ebenezer, South Australia, a town

=== Canada ===
- Ebenezer, Prince Edward Island, a historic place in Queens County, Prince Edward Island
- Ebenezer, Saskatchewan, a village

=== United States ===
- Ebenezer, Georgia, a ghost town
- Ebenezer, Kentucky, an unincorporated community
- Ebenezer, Mississippi, an unincorporated community
- Ebenezer, Missouri, an unincorporated community
- Ebenezer, New York, a hamlet
- Ebenezer, Ohio, an unincorporated community
- Ebenezer, Pennsylvania, an unincorporated community
- Ebenezer, Camp County, Texas, an unincorporated community
- Ebenezer, Jasper County, Texas, an unincorporated community
- Ebenezer, Virginia, an unincorporated community
- Ebenezer, Wisconsin, an unincorporated community

== Other uses ==
- Ebenezer (1998 film), a 1998 Canadian television film adaptation of A Christmas Carol with a Western setting
- Ebenezer (2026 film), a 2026 film adaptation of A Christmas Carol starring Johnny Depp
- Ebenezer (hymn), a Welsh tune to which many hymns are set

== See also ==
- Ebenezer Church (disambiguation)
- Ebenezer Colonies, New York
- Ebenhaeser, South Africa
- New Ebenezer, New York
- Ebenezer Floppen Slopper's Wonderful Water slides, an abandoned waterpark in Illinois
- The Book of Ebenezer Le Page, a novel by Gerald Basil Edwards
- "Ebeneezer Goode", a 1992 song by the Shamen
- "Come Thou Fount of Every Blessing", a hymn written by Robert Robinson in 1758
