= Listed buildings in Seamer, Scarborough =

Seamer, Scarborough is a civil parish in the county of North Yorkshire, England. It contains seven listed buildings that are recorded in the National Heritage List for England. Of these, one is listed at Grade I, the highest of the three grades, and the others are at Grade II, the lowest grade. The parish contains the village of Seamer and the surrounding area. All the listed buildings are in the village, and consist of a church, the ruins of the manor house, a public house, a school and school house converted into a private house, and other houses and cottages.

== Key ==
Grade	Criteria
I	Buildings of exceptional interest, sometimes considered to be internationally important
II	Buildings of national importance and special interest

== Buildings ==
Name and location	Photograph	Date	Notes	Grade
St Martin's Church; 54.23609°N 0.44439°W		Early 12th century	The church has been altered and extended through the centuries, including re-roofing and restoration by C. Hodgson Fowler in 1885–89. It is built in sandstone with stone flag roofs, and consists of a nave with a clerestory, a north aisle, a south porch, a chancel with a north chantry chapel and vestry, and a west tower. The tower has three stages, angle buttresses, a clock face, two-light bell openings under round arches, a corbel table, and an embattled parapet. There are also embattled parapets on the body of the church. The south doorway has a round arch with two orders, scalloped capitals and roll moulding. On the east gable of the nave is a bellcote.	I
Ruins of the manor house 54.23642°N 0.44692°W		15th century (or earlier)	The ruins are in a field and in limestone. They consist of a wall with a shaped floor band, and contain a doorway with a four-centred arched head. There are extensive foundations around the wall.	II
Londesborough Arms; 54.23705°N 0.44353°W		Early to mid-17th century	A manor house, altered, and later a public house. It is in painted sandstone on a plinth, partly rendered, with a hipped slate roof. There are two storeys, and a front of three bays, the outer days projecting and linked by a slated porch. On the right return is a doorway with attached columns, paterae, and an open pediment. The windows are sashes, some horizontally sliding.	II
78, 79 and 80 Main Street; 54.23890°N 0.44490°W	—	Early 18th century (probable)	A school and school house converted into three dwellings, in variegated brick on a stone plinth with quoins on the front, in limestone at the rear, and with a pantile roof with coped gables and shaped kneelers. There are two storeys and seven bays, and later extensions. Each house has a doorway with a divided fanlight, the middle house has sash windows and wedge lintels to the ground floor openings, and the other windows are 20th-century replacements.	II
Eastgate House; 54.24002°N 0.44064°W	—	Mid to late 18th century	The house is in sandstone and limestone and has a pantile roof. There are three storeys and three bays. The central doorway has a fanlight, and a cornice on brackets. The windows are sashes, on the lower two floors with plain lintels, and on the top floor with wedge lintels. At the rear is a round-headed staircase window with an archivolt of gauged brick.	II
65, 66 and 67 Main Street; 54.23829°N 0.44399°W	—	Late 18th century	A row of three cottages in limestone with a pantile roof. There are two storeys, six bays, and a single storey with a catslide roof at the rear. On the front are three doorways and eight horizontally sliding sash windows, all with wedge lintels. On the upper floor are two circular windows with raised stone surrounds.	II
Bridge End Cottage; 54.23218°N 0.44242°W	—	Late 18th century	The house is in limestone with a pantile roof. There are two storeys and three bays, and a rear range. In the centre is a doorway with a divided fanlight, on the front the windows are sash windows, and all the openings have wedge lintels and keystones. At the rear, the windows are horizontally sliding small-pane sashes with timber lintels.	II
