= Saron, Carmarthenshire =

Mining village in Carmarthenshire, Wales

Coordinates: 51.79342°N 4.02917°W

Saron is a former mining village near the town of Ammanford in Carmarthenshire, Wales. Saron is in the community of Llandybie.

It is named after Saron Baptist Chapel which was established around 1810.

== Governance ==
A Saron electoral ward exists for elections to Carmarthenshire County Council, represented by two county councillors. The ward corresponds to the Saron ward of Llandybie Community Council. The population of this ward taken at the 2011 census was 4,111.

== Noble people ==
- Agnes Davies, a world champion snooker player.
