= Londesborough Arms, Seamer =

Pub in Seamer, North Yorkshire, England

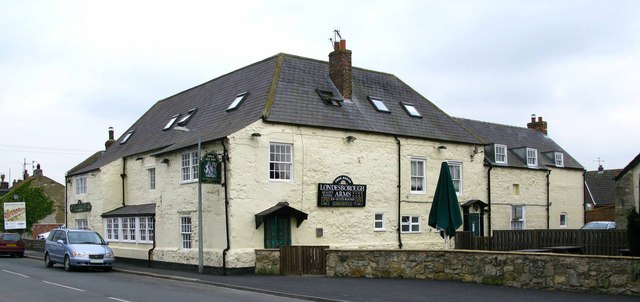
The pub, in 2009

The Londesborough Arms is a historic pub in Seamer, a village near Scarborough, North Yorkshire, in England.

The building was constructed as a manor house, in the early or mid 18th century, and was later converted into a pub. It was extended and remodelled in the early 19th century and was further altered in the 20th century. The building was grade II listed in 1967. It was renovated in 2016 at a cost of £200,000, at which time it was owned by Punch Taverns. By 2023, it was owned by Heineken's Star Pubs, which invested £125,000 in work which included creating four additional bedrooms, to add to the existing nine.

The pub is constructed of painted sandstone on a plinth, partly rendered, with a hipped slate roof. It has two storeys, and a front of three bays, the outer days projecting and linked by a slated porch. On the right return is a doorway with attached columns, paterae, and an open pediment. The windows are sashes, some horizontally sliding.

== See also ==
- Listed buildings in Seamer, Scarborough
