= St John the Baptist's Church, East Ayton =

Parish church of East Ayton, North Yorkshire, England

Coordinates: 54°15′02″N 0°28′48″W

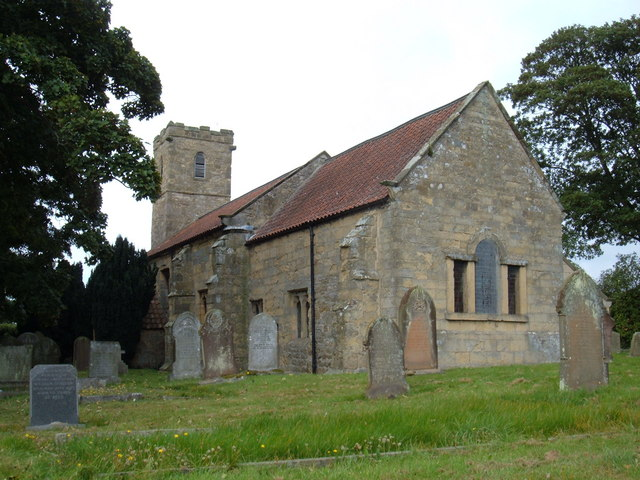
The church, in 2009

St John the Baptist's Church is the parish church of East Ayton, a village in North Yorkshire, in England.

The church was built in about 1135, replacing an earlier chapel. From this 12th-century building survive the nave, south doorway, chancel arch and lower parts of the tower. The chancel was added in the 13th century, and it was altered in the 15th century, when the nave windows were also altered, the tower heightened, and buttresses added to the nave. The bell and lead roof were removed in 1548, during the suppression of chantry chapels. The south porch was added in 1634, and the chancel was partly rebuilt in the 18th century. A vestry was added in the 19th century. The church was grade II* listed in 1967.

The church is built of sandstone. The body of the church has a pantile roof and the roofs of the porch and vestry are slated. The church consists of a three-bay nave, a south porch, a chancel with a north vestry, and a west tower partly embraced by the nave. The tower has three stages, a lancet window, lancet bell openings, and an embattled parapet. The porch is gabled with a flat opening, and the round-headed south doorway is Norman with one order, and beakhead moulding. The east window is in Venetian style. Inside, there is a 12th-century font.

== See also ==
- Grade II* listed churches in North Yorkshire (district)
- Listed buildings in East Ayton
