= Saron Baptist Chapel =

Chapel in Saron, Carmarthenshire, Wales

Saron, Llandybie
- Saron, Llandybie
- 51°47′33″N 4°01′52″W
- Location: Saron Village, Llandybie, Carmarthenshire
- Country: Wales
- Denomination: Baptist

History
- Founded: 1810

Architecture
- Architectural type: Chapel
- Style: Early 19th century
- Completed: 1913

Saron is a Baptist chapel in the village of Saron in the community of Llandybie, Ammanford, Carmarthenshire. Services at Saron are conducted in the Welsh language.

== Early history ==
Saron was founded in 1810 by Baptists who originally worshipped in a dwelling house in Capel Hendre. They later met in a dwelling house located where the Old Chapel, built in 1814, still stands today. Part of the dwelling house was incorporated into the chapel. The first minister was William Michael from Drefach, Llandysul, and he held a day school in the chapel. Michael died in 1824 and the chapel was without a minister until Benjamin Thomas was inducted in 1832. Thomas came from Cilgerran in Pembrokeshire and was minister of Saron as well as Penrhiwgoch and Sardis, Llanedi until his death in 1858.

== The ministry of T.F. Williams ==
In 1861, the Reverend T.F. Williams commenced his long ministry at Saron. During his pastorate the chapel was extended and refurbished. Williams took on the pastorate of Ebenezer, Cross Inn, as well as Saron, in 1867. During these decades the population of Cross Inn, renamed Ammanford in the 1880s, grew rapidly as it became a major centre of the anthracite coal trade. As a result, Williams became minister of Ebenezer alone, now a rapidly expanding church, in 1891 and remained until his retirement in 1907.

== Twentieth century ==
David Stephen Davies was inducted as minister of Saron in 1892 and remained until 1923. During this period Bethesda, Tycroes, was formed as a branch of Saron. The Old Chapel was now too small and a new chapel was opened in 1913. It took ten years to clear a debt of £10,000.

== Later history ==
Richard Lloyd came to Saron from Caersalem, Dowlais in 1927 and was minister for thirty years until his retirement in 1957. He was succeeded by W. Gwyn Thomas from 1958 until 1965.

E. Lyn Rees became minister at Saron in 1966 and served for over fifty years, until his death in September 2024.

== Sources ==
- Llawlyfr Undeb Bedyddwyr Cymru, Rhydaman a'r Cylch (in Welsh). 1981.
