= Seamer, Scarborough =

Village and civil parish in North Yorkshire, England

Coordinates: 54°14′17″N 0°26′31″W

Seamer
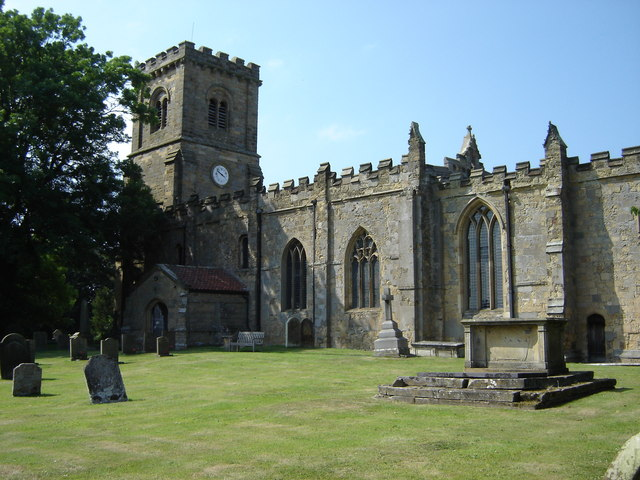
- St Martin’s Church

- Location within North Yorkshire
- Population: 4,335 (2011 census)
- OS grid reference: TA016836
- Civil parish: Seamer
- Unitary authority: North Yorkshire
- Ceremonial county: North Yorkshire
- Region: Yorkshire and the Humber
- Country: England
- Sovereign state: United Kingdom
- Post town: SCARBOROUGH
- Postcode district: YO12
- Police: North Yorkshire
- Fire: North Yorkshire
- Ambulance: Yorkshire
- UK Parliament: Scarborough and Whitby

Seamer is a village and civil parish in the county of North Yorkshire, England. It was the location of the Mesolithic Age settlement of Star Carr.

The parish is composed of the townships of Seamer and Irton and the chapelry of East Ayton. Its area is 8,450 acres, of which 18 acres are covered by water, 4,422 acres are arable, 2,178 acres permanent grass and 738 woodland. (fn. 1) The subsoil is Alluvium, Oxford Clay, Corallian Beds and Inferior Oolite. In Ruston Cliff Wood by the Derwent, the western boundary, are Whetstone Quarry, Whetstone Trod, Ayton Forge Cottages and Wallis Quarry, and there is a quarry at Crossgates. This hamlet lies at the junction of the Scarborough and Filey roads, which unite before passing through Seamer on their way to York and Driffield. The chief crops are wheat, barley, oats, potatoes and turnips. In 1768 1,337 acres were inclosed in East Ayton. (fn. 2) The village of Seamer is built upon practically level ground and contains no features of any antiquity. The St Martin's Church and the vicarage are in the centre. A short distance to the west of the church are some scanty remains of the Seamer Manor House. A ruined fragment of wall containing a 15th-century doorway is now all that is standing above ground, but extensive foundation mounds may be traced in connexion with it.

== Early history ==
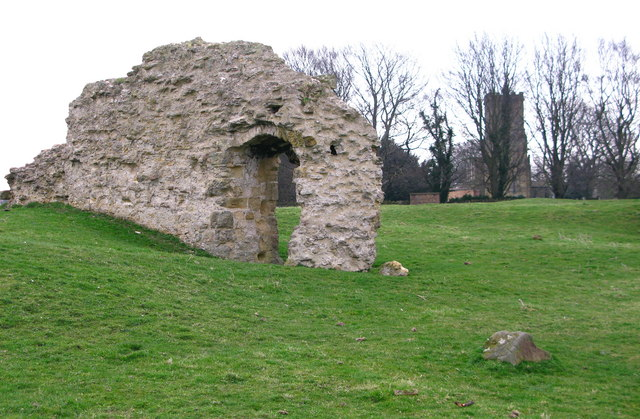
The ruins of Seamer Manor House

=== Prehistoric Seamer ===
The first inhabitants of the parish were people of the Mesolithic Age about ten thousand years ago whose settlement at Star Carr, located in the parish, was discovered in 1947. In August 2010, a team announced that they had discovered there the oldest known house in Britain, dated to 10,500 years before the present. The Star Carr house was comparable to an Iron Age roundhouse, about 3.5 metres (11 ft) wide and made of wood. It is believed to have been used for between 200 and 500 years after its construction.

In 70 AD, the Romans crossed the River Humber and entered Yorkshire. With the construction of a vexillation fort, Derventio Brigantum at what is now Malton, roads to the coast were built. Archaeologists have speculated that a few years after this, a veteran soldier may have taken his retirement pension in the form of a land grant in the Seamer area, and constructed an early Roman-style farm on the land. A number of other Roman structures have been found in the Seamer area, one of which was probably an industrial premises.

=== Domesday ===
Its name is first attested in the Domesday Book of 1086 as Semær, with later medieval attestations including Semare and Samara. The first element is Old English sǣ 'lake'; the spelling of the second element suggests variation between Old English mere 'sea' and Old Norse marr 'lake, sea, pool'. The dominant meaning of the name therefore seems to have been 'lake by the sea'. 'The reference was to a lake now drained in the area SW of the church at Seamer Carr TA 0281. Domesday Book reports that in 1066 it was held by Gospatric son of Arnketil, a major landholder, and that in 1086 it was held by Richard of Sourdeval under Robert, Count of Mortain. At that time it contained 21 ploughlands and was home to 8 villagers, with an annual income for the lord of £1, down from £2 in 1066.

== Modern history ==
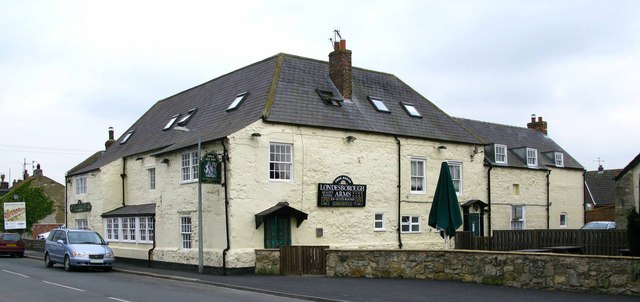
The Londesborough Arms

The summer of 1603 was an exceptionally long one, which prolonged the presence of the plague to the north of Seamer in Whitby, Robin Hood's Bay and Harwood Dale. Edward Gate, who owned the manor of Seamer, leased it to his son-in-law, Thomas Mompesson, in 1604. In 1609, the King granted Mompesson a market and fair, as in the reign of Richard II, and also a Court of Piepowders, which would be attached to the market and where justice could be dispensed immediately to criminals. Mompesson also petitioned the Earl of Salisbury to grant him the parsonage of Seamer and the chapels of Cayton and East Ayton. However, his "success was short lived," and by 1611, Scarborough had managed to get the market closed.

In 1613, ownership of the manor passed to Sir Nicholas Salter, from London, and in 1623, the manor was again sold on to Edward Wareham and William Talbot. In 1625, the plague struck Scalby, and Sir Thomas Posthumous Hoby of Hackness effectively quarantined them. As McGeown notes, "People in all the surrounding villages would have been anxious." In 1631, ownership of the manor was again sold on to Sir Robert Napier, 2nd Baronet, of Luton Hoo in Bedfordshire. On 19 March 1639, Napier wrote to the bailiffs and burgesses of Scarborough, asking for support in case he was to stand as Scarborough's MP, but he never represented the town.

Following Charles I's failure in the Second Bishops' War in 1640, the defeated English army had not been paid and instead were forcibly billeted in parts of Yorkshire. One band of the Earl of Canaervon's soldiers was billeted at Hutton Bushell and West Ayton. An outrage occurred when in 1640, the only local landowning gentleman, Roger Wyvill, spotted four of Canaervon's soldiers attacking a traveller in Seamer, and tried to intervene. In return, he was chased down the street by the soldiers, only escaping by hiding in one of the fireplaces of the Seamer manor house. This matter was later brought before the authorities, where Wyvill described "The evil behaviour and grand abuses of the king's soldiers in his locality."

When the English Civil War broke out in August 1642, Sir Hugh Cholmeley, 1st Baronet, the MP for Scarborough, was sent north by Parliament to put the town in a state of readiness. Prior to this, Roger Wyvill, and his son Captain William Wyvill, had been recruiting for the king. However, in March 1643, Cholmeley was persuaded to change allegiances, and joined the Royalists. Following the Battle of Marston Moor in July 1644, and the Parliamentarian capture of York, Scarborough became the most important Royalist stronghold in Yorkshire. The owner of Seamer throughout this period remained Sir Robert Napier, who was a Royalist and whose estates in Bedfordshire and "presumably elsewhere" had been sequestered by Parliament. In January 1644, it is recorded that a camp of Parliamentarian soldiers was stationed in Seamer. In February 1645, Sir John Meldrum captured the town, and began the siege of the castle, which concluded in a Parliamentarian victory on 25 July.

Seamer was a busy village in Norman times and from the eleventh century there has been a succession of Lords of the Manor. In 1066 Seamer had both a church and a priest so it must have been a place of some importance. By the middle of the twelfth century the original wooden Saxon church had been replaced with a stone building with a tower which served as a minor castle. In the fourteenth century the size of the Manor House was increased. The village became more affluent and in 1337 King Richard II granted a charter for an annual fair to be held. Despite the population being decimated by the 'Black Death' the village survived and flourished. By 1760 there were nine inns. During the 1800s Primitive and Wesleyan chapels were erected. The Victorian Board School was established in 1879 and the Parish Council was formed in 1894. The economy of the parish was based on agriculture and there were 27 farmers recorded in 1913.

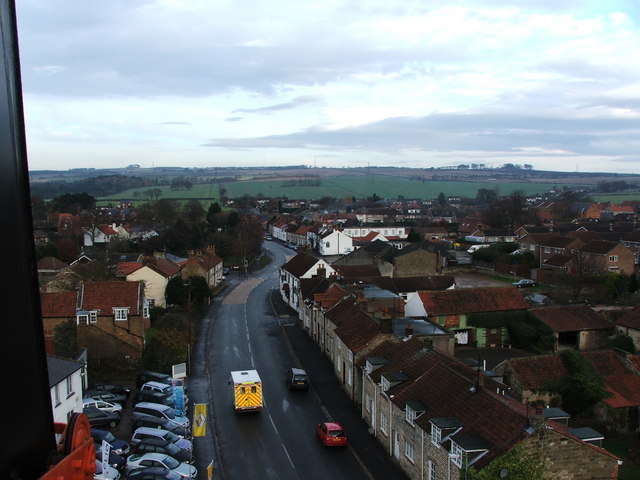
Seamer Main Street looking towards Irton Moor

The most significant historic event connected with Seamer was an insurrection in 1549 in resulting from the dissolution of monasteries. The conspirators assembled about 3,000 people and proceeded to the house of one Mr. White, a gentleman who had rendered himself obnoxious to them. They broke into the house, captured the owner, Mr. Clapton, his brother-in-law, Mr. Richard Savage, sheriff of York, and a manservant, and carried them off to the Wolds, where they were stripped and murdered. The insurrection, however, was nipped in the bud. A detachment of soldiers from the garrison at York was sent to capture them; a free pardon was proclaimed by order of the King, but the three leaders - Thomas Dale, John Stevenson (Stephenson) and William Ombler were executed at York.

With the establishment of the railway and the increase in public and private transport the quiet, peaceful parish of Seamer was ripe for expansion after the First World War. Large housing developments have taken place at Seamer and Crossgates since the 1960s and an industrial estate now occupies the south-eastern corner of the parish. In 1891 the population was 681 – the population now stands at some 4,000 and the community continues to expand, but it remains a pleasant dormitory parish.

According to the 2011 UK census, Seamer parish had a population of 4,335, an increase on the 2001 UK census figure of 3,774. In 2017 plans were approved to build 241 new homes in Seamer.

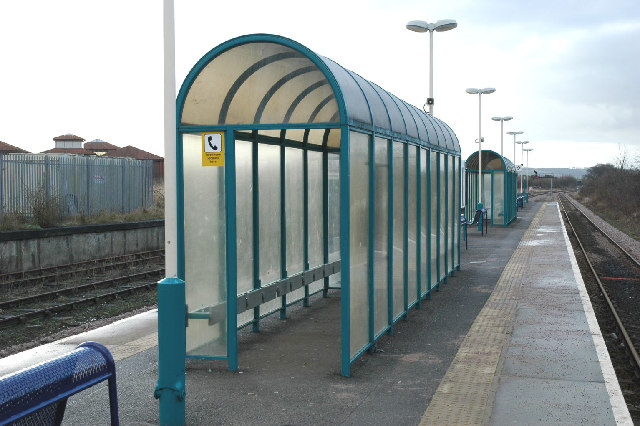
Seamer railway station

It is served by a railway station which is on the Yorkshire Coast Line that runs between Hull and Scarborough. It is also served by the Scarborough branch of the North TransPennine service from York. It also has a school, and has several communal clubs held around the village.

== Governance ==
Seamer is governed by a parish council. From 1974 to 2023 it was part of the Borough of Scarborough, it is now administered by the unitary North Yorkshire Council.

It is part of the Scarborough and Whitby parliamentary constituency.

== See also ==
- Listed buildings in Seamer, Scarborough
