= Ebenezer Presbyterian Church =

Ebenezer Presbyterian Church may refer to:

- Ebenezer Presbyterian Church (Keene, Kentucky), listed on the NRHP in Kentucky
- Ebenezer Academy, Bethany Presbyterian Church and Cemetery, Houstonville, NC, listed on the NRHP in North Carolina
- Ebenezer Presbyterian Church (New Bern, North Carolina), listed on the NRHP in North Carolina
- Ebenezer Associate Reformed Presbyterian Church, Jenkinsville, SC, listed on the NRHP in South Carolina
- Ebenezer Presbyterian Church, Osu, Accra, Ghana
- Ramseyer Memorial Presbyterian Church, Ghana
