= Listed buildings in Bielby =

Bielby is a civil parish in the county of the East Riding of Yorkshire, England. It contains six listed buildings that are recorded in the National Heritage List for England. Of these, one is listed at Grade II*, the middle of the three grades, and the others are at Grade II, the lowest grade. The parish contains the village of Bielby and the surrounding countryside. The Pocklington Canal passes through the parish, and the listed buildings associated with it are two locks and a bridge. The other listed buildings are a church, a former chapel and a watermill and mill house.

== Key ==
Grade	Criteria
II*	Particularly important buildings of more than special interest
II	Buildings of national importance and special interest

== Buildings ==
Name and location	Photograph	Date	Notes	Grade
St Giles' Church; 53.88372°N 0.80170°W		12th century	The church has been altered and extended through the centuries, and was partly rebuilt in 1792 reusing older material. It is in colourwashed rendered stone, with slate roofs. The church consists of a continuous nave and chancel, and has a west bellcote with louvres and a pyramidal roof. Two of the windows incorporate 12th-century beakheads as keystones, and the rebuilt west door incoporates 12th-century chevron and beakhead ornament.	II*
Coat's Bridge; 53.89710°N 0.80627°W		1818	The bridge carries a road over the Pocklington Canal. It is in brick, and consists of a single basket arch. The bridge has stone voussoirs, a string course, outswept parapets ending in square stone-capped brick pillars, and segmental brick buttresses with rounded stone caps.	II
Coat's Lock; 53.89743°N 0.80628°W		1818	The lock on the Pocklington Canal is in red brick and stone, with gritstone coping. The lock chamber is rectangular, with splay to the north and stepped sides to the south.	II
Sandhill Lock; 53.90150°N 0.80257°W		1818	The lock on the Pocklington Canal is in red brick, with gritstone coping. The lock chamber is rectangular, with splay to the north and stepped sides to the south.	II
Wesleyan Chapel; 53.88350°N 0.800930°W		1837	The former chapel is in yellow brick with a hipped slate roof. Stone steps lead up to the central doorway, which is flanked by sash windows, all with segmental wedge lintels. Above the doorway is an inscribed and dated sundial, and over that is an inscribed and dated oval plaque.	II
Bielby Mill and House; 53.88590°N 0.80369°W		1855	The watermill and attached house are in red brick, with pantile roofs and tumbled-in brickwork to the gables. The mill has three storeys and four bays. The house to the right has two storeys and one bay. Both parts contain openings and sash windows with segmental heads, and the house has a raking dormer.	II
