= Seamer Manor House =

Ruined building in Seamer, North Yorkshire, England

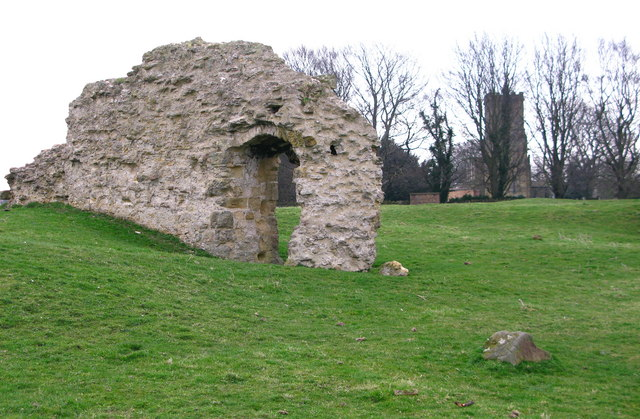
The ruins, in 2009

Seamer Manor House is a ruined historic building in Seamer, a village near Scarborough, North Yorkshire, in England.

There was a manor of Seamer before the Norman Conquest, and after the Conquest it was given to the Percy family. They built a dower house by 1304. In 1536, they gave it to the Crown, after which it became known as a castle. John Leland described it as being large but poorly built, with the exception of the chapel. It passed through several owners before being abandoned at an unknown date. The surviving ruins have been grade II listed since 1951, while the earthworks have been a scheduled monument since 1958.

The ruins are in a field and are built of limestone. They consist of a 12 metre-long wall with a shaped floor band, and contain a doorway with a four-centred arched head. There are extensive foundations around the wall.

== See also ==
- Listed buildings in Seamer, Scarborough
