= Ebenezer Methodist Chapel, East Ayton =

Former chapel in East Ayton, North Yorkshire, England

Coordinates: 54°15′01″N 0°29′01″W

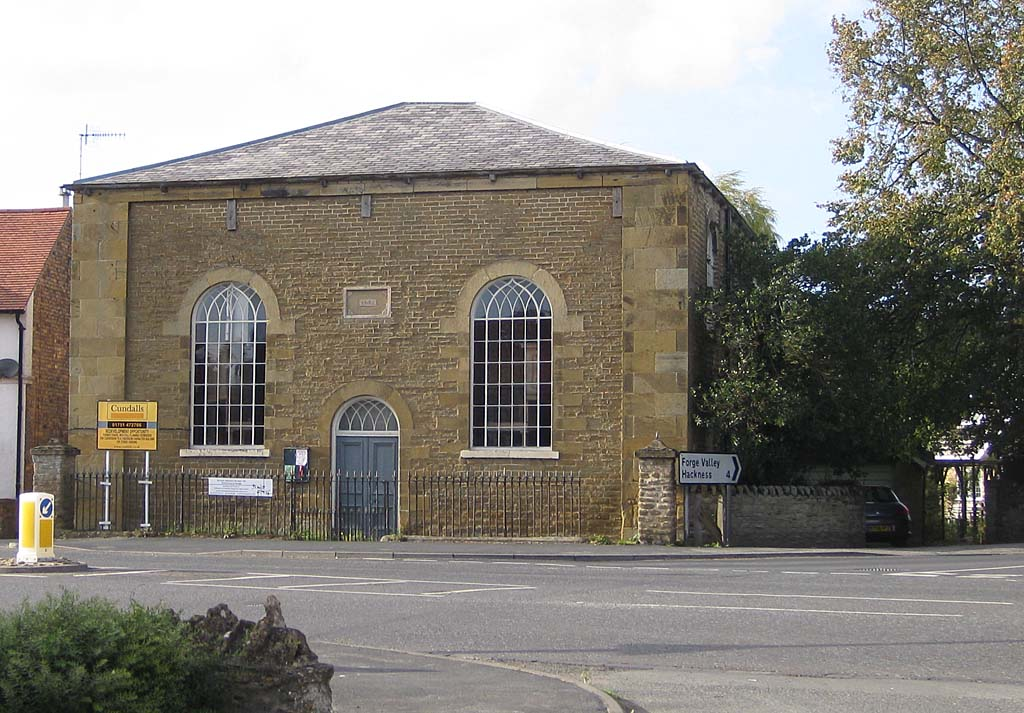
The chapel, in 2011

The Ebenezer Methodist Chapel is a former chapel in East Ayton, a village in North Yorkshire, in England.

William Clowes preached in East Ayton in the early 1820s, and a small Primitive Methodist chapel was built soon afterwards. As the congregation grew, a larger building was required, and the current building was completed in July 1842, at a cost of £470. Inside, the building originally had a gallery around three sides, the area under part of which had a sliding partition, in order that it could serve as a separate Sunday school. The building was grade II listed in 1967. The chapel was closed by the early 21st century and has been offered for sale, for conversion into a house.

The chapel is built of sandstone, with angle pilasters forming quoins on the returns, and a hipped slate roof. On the front is a round-arched doorway with a fanlight, flanked by large round-arched windows, all with quoined surrounds. Above the doorway is a recessed dated panel. On the sides are sash windows with round arches in the upper floor and flat heads in the lower floor.

== See also ==
- Listed buildings in East Ayton
