= Listed buildings in East Ayton =

East Ayton is a civil parish in the county of North Yorkshire, England. It contains eleven listed buildings that are recorded in the National Heritage List for England. Of these, one is listed at Grade II*, the middle of the three grades, and the others are at Grade II, the lowest grade. The parish contains the village of East Ayton and the surrounding area. All the listed buildings are in the village, and include houses, cottages, a church, a former chapel, a bridge and an animal pound.

== Key ==
Grade	Criteria
II*	Particularly important buildings of more than special interest
II	Buildings of national importance and special interest

== Buildings ==
Name and location	Photograph	Date	Notes	Grade
St John the Baptist's Church; 54.25068°N 0.48003°W		12th century	The church has been altered and extended through the centuries. It is in sandstone, the body of the church has a pantile roof and the roofs of the porch and vestry are slated. The church consists of a nave, a south porch, a chancel with a north vestry, and a west tower partly embraced by the nave. The tower has three stages, a lancet window, lancet bell openings, and an embattled parapet. The porch is gabled with a flat opening, and the round-headed south doorway is Norman with one order, and beakhead moulding. The east window is in Venetian style.	II*
12 Castlegate; 54.25067°N 0.48287°W	—	Late 17th century	A house with a cruck and timber framed core, later encased in limestone, with a pantile roof that has a coped gable and a shaped kneeler on the left. There is a single storey and an attic, three bays, and a rear outshut. On the front is a doorway, to its right is a casement window and a horizontally-sliding sash window. Above the doorway is a small fixed window, and to the right are two horizontally-sliding sashes. Inside, there is a pair of full crucks and exposed timber framing.	II
Old Weaver's Cottage; 54.25018°N 0.48101°W	—	Early 18th century	The cottage is in sandstone with a pantile roof. There are two storeys and three bays. On the front is a doorway and one fixed window, and the other windows are horizontally-sliding sashes.	II
Village pound 54.24978°N 0.48033°W	—	18th century (probable)	The pound, which was partly rebuilt in 1980, is in limestone, surrounded by a wall about 1.5 metres (4 ft 11 in) high. It is a square enclosure with a rounded corner.	II
Ayton Bridge; 54.24925°N 0.48527°W		1775	The bridge, designed by John Carr, carries Pickering Road (A170 road) over the River Derwent. It is in sandstone, and consists of four arches, the middle one larger, with voussoirs. The bridge has pilaster buttresses rising to form embrasures, a band under the parapet that has cambered coping, and ends in cylindrical piers with domed tops.	II
8 and 10 Castlegate; 54.25056°N 0.48289°W	—	Late 18th century	A pair of houses in sandstone with a pantile roof. There are two storeys, and each house has two bays. In the centre of each house is a doorway, the windows in the right house date from the 20th century and are in the original openings, and in the left house they are horizontally-sliding sashes. All the openings have tripartite wedge lintels and keystones.	II
34 Castlegate; 54.25183°N 0.48168°W	—	Late 18th century	The house is in whitewashed stone, and has a pantile roof with coped gables and shaped kneelers. There are two storeys, a double depth plan and three bays. The doorway is approached by steps, the windows are sashes, and all the openings have tripartite lintels and keystones.	II
43 Main Street; 54.25048°N 0.48032°W		Late 18th century	The cottage is in limestone and has a pantile roof. There is a single storey and an attic, two bays, and a rear outshut with a catslide roof. On the front is a doorway and horizontally-sliding sash windows, the doorway and the window to its left with a flat brick arch.	II
Church Farmhouse; 54.25027°N 0.48047°W	—	Late 18th century	The house is in sandstone with a pantile roof. There are two storeys, three bays and a rear wing. The central doorway has a fanlight, the windows are sashes, and all the openings have tripartite lintels and keystones.	II
Derwent House; 54.24701°N 0.48542°W	—	Early 19th century	The house is in sandstone, with quoins, a moulded eaves cornice, and a hipped slate roof. There are two storeys, a double depth plan, three bays, and a rear wing. In the centre is a porch, and a doorway with a fanlight and a cornice on scroll brackets. The windows are sashes, the window above the doorway with an architrave, and the others with quoined surrounds and heavy lintels.	II
Former Ebenezer Methodist Chapel; 54.25020°N 0.48356°W		1842	The former chapel is in sandstone, with angle pilasters forming quoins on the returns, and a hipped slate roof. On the front is a round-arched doorway with a fanlight, flanked by large round-arched windows, all with quoined surrounds. Above the doorway is a recessed dated panel. On the sides are sash windows with round arches in the upper floor and flat heads in the lower floor.	II
