= Ebenezer Academy =

- U.S. National Register of Historic Places
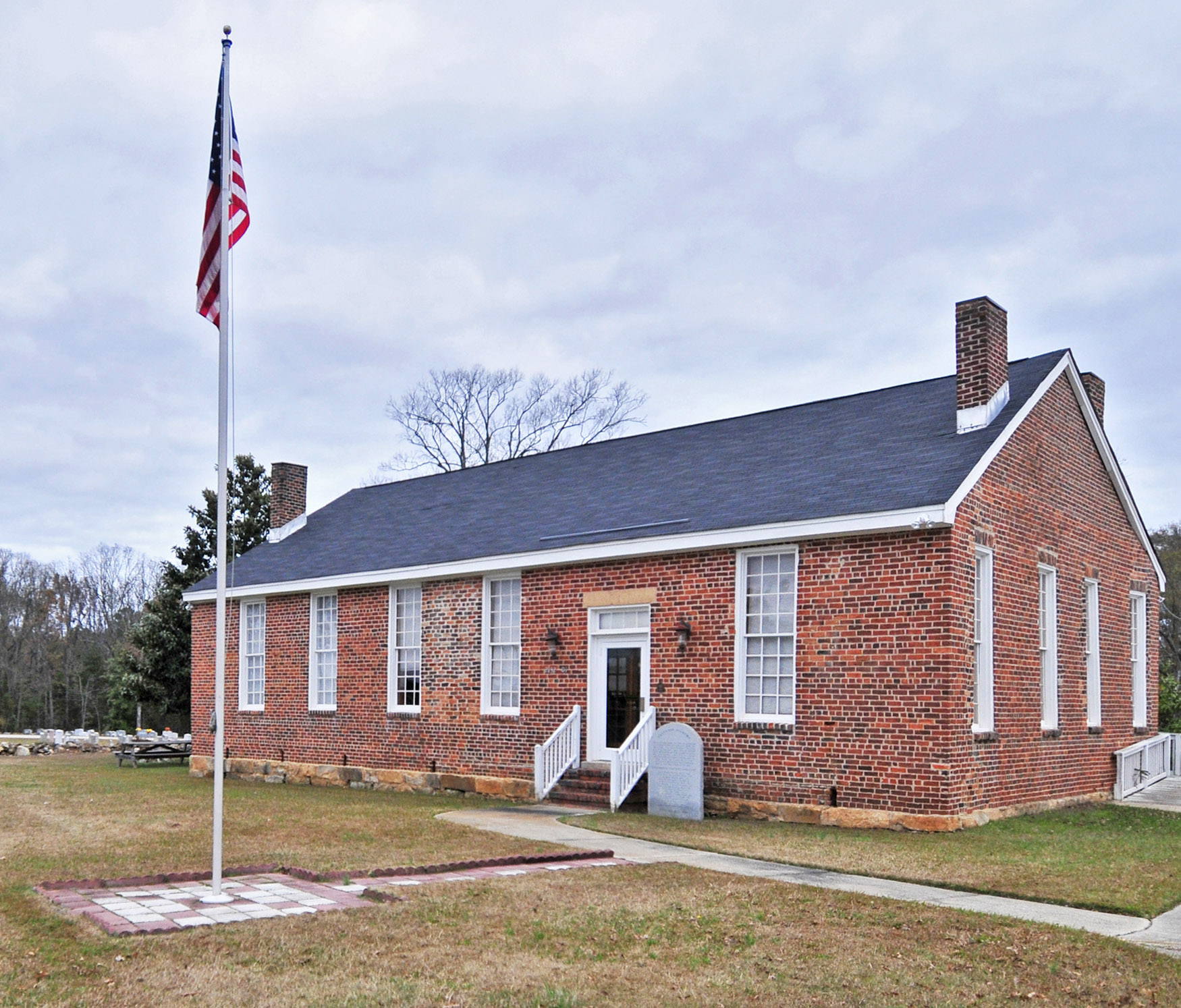
- Ebenezer Academy, November 2011

- Location within South Carolina Location within the United States
- Location: 2132 Ebenezer Rd., Rock Hill, South Carolina
- Coordinates: 34°58′1″N 81°3′6″W
- Area: less than one acre
- Built: c. 1860
- NRHP reference No.: 77001234
- Added to NRHP: August 16, 1977

Ebenezer Academy is a historic school building located at Rock Hill, South Carolina. It was built about 1860, and is a one-story, rectangular brick structure of simple design. The school was originally associated with Ebenezer Presbyterian Church until Rock Hill public schools were established about 1888 and was leased to York County for an elementary school. The school continued until 1950 when it was deeded back to the church. It is the oldest known school building standing in York County.

It was listed on the National Register of Historic Places in 1977.
