= Ebenezer Baptist Church (Atchison, Kansas) =

Historic church in Kansas, United States

- U.S. National Register of Historic Places
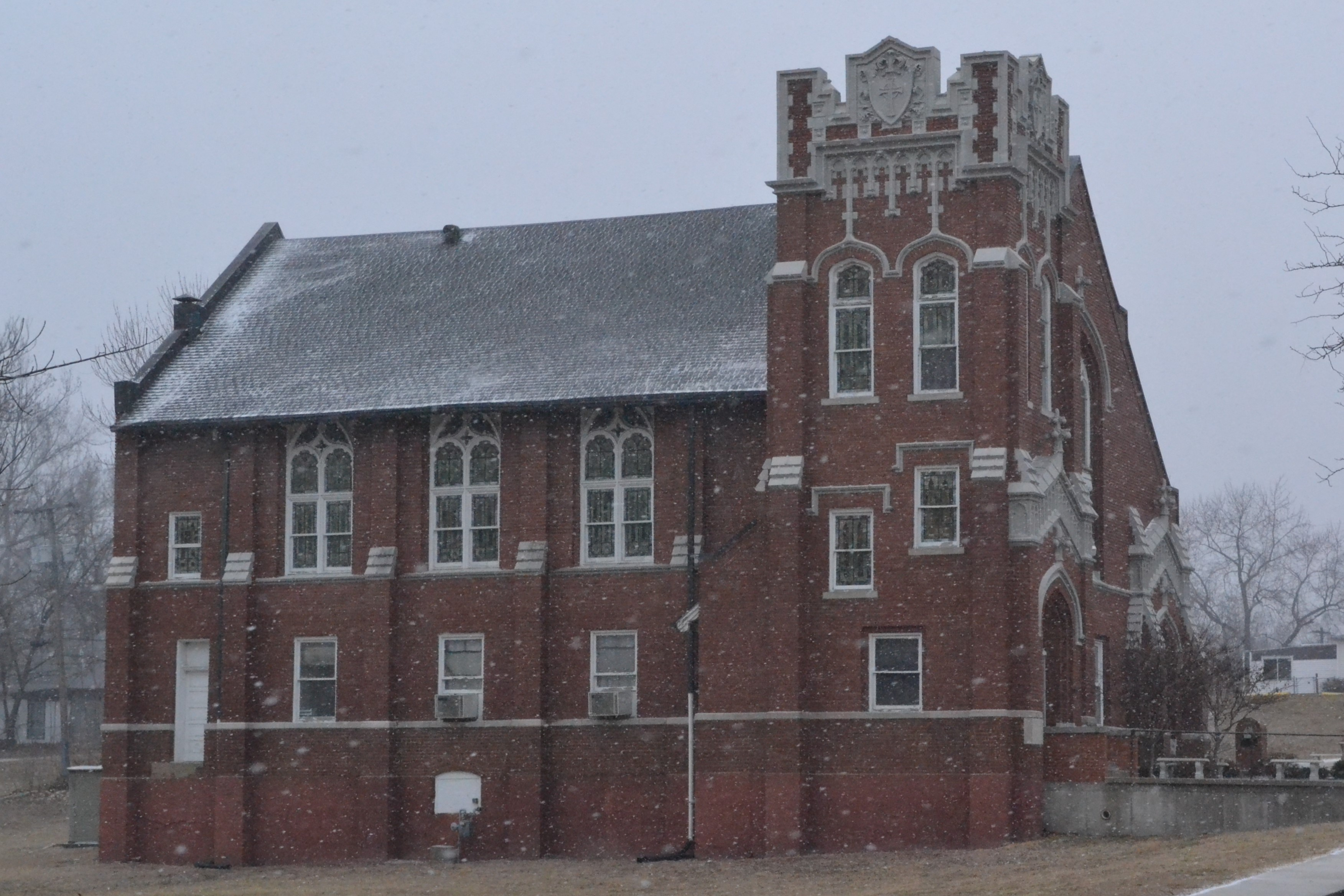

- Location within Kansas Location within the United States
- Location: 826 Riley, Atchison, Kansas
- Coordinates: 39°34′9″N 95°7′28″W
- Built: 1911-c.1923
- Architect: Smothers, Rev. William
- Architectural style: Late Gothic Revival
- NRHP reference No.: 05001343
- Added to NRHP: November 30, 2005

Ebenezer Baptist Church is a church at 826 Riley in Atchison, Kansas. It was built during the period from 1911 to about 1923. In 1911 they benefited from the generosity of either Andrew Carnegie or John Rockefeller to acquire their pipe organ. They had written to both men; and the organ company received a check, but from whom remains unknown ("the flock does not know whether to thank the oil magnate or the ironmaster").

It was added to the National Register of Historic Places in 2005. The building was deemed notable in architecture:

as a very good example of the Gothic Revival style. This masonry structure has well-executed stained glass gothic windows, distinctive use of limestone articulating windows, entrances, buttresses, blind flowing tracery details, and interior wood trim and ceilings. The building exemplifies the attention that was paid to craft and utility and form that expresses the interior shape. The sanctuary level of the building is emphasized with the use of stained glass windows and the stairwell stained glass windows leading up to the sanctuary. Opposite of the chancery is the memorial stained glass window dedicated to Reverend William Strothers, who designed the church building and served as the pastor from 1881 to 1913.
