= Ebenezer Presbyterian Church (New Bern, North Carolina) =

Historic church in North Carolina, United States

- U.S. National Register of Historic Places
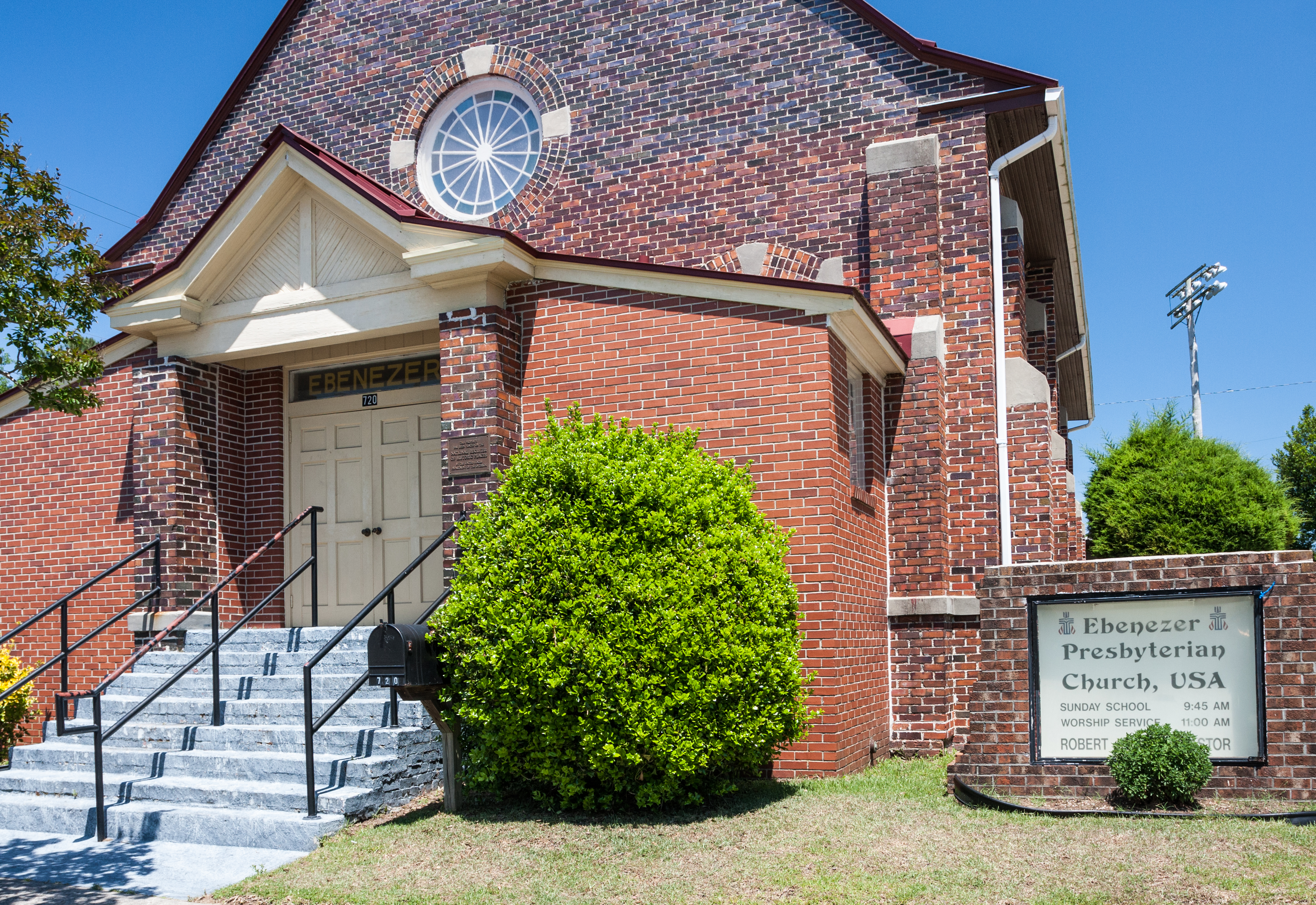

- Location within North Carolina Location within the United States
- Location: 720 Bern St., New Bern, North Carolina
- Coordinates: 35°6′42″N 77°2′46″W
- Area: less than one acre
- Built: 1924
- Architect: Sutton, H.F.
- Architectural style: Late Gothic Revival
- MPS: Historic African American Churches in Craven County MPS
- NRHP reference No.: 97000573
- Added to NRHP: June 30, 1997

Ebenezer Presbyterian Church is a historic African-American Presbyterian church at 720 Bern Street in New Bern, Craven County, North Carolina. It was built in 1924, and is a small brick Late Gothic Revival-style church building.

It was listed on the National Register of Historic Places in 1997.
