= East Ayton =

Village and civil parish in North Yorkshire, England

Coordinates: 54°15′10″N 0°28′38″W

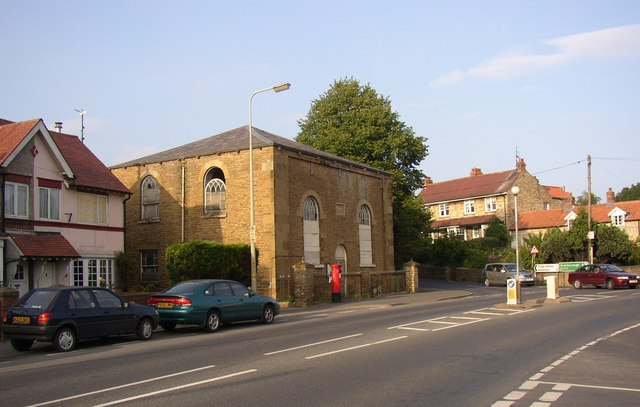
- East Ayton

- Location within North Yorkshire
- Population: 1,678 (2011 census)
- OS grid reference: SE994854
- Civil parish: East Ayton
- Unitary authority: North Yorkshire
- Ceremonial county: North Yorkshire
- Region: Yorkshire and the Humber
- Country: England
- Sovereign state: United Kingdom
- Post town: SCARBOROUGH
- Postcode district: YO13
- Police: North Yorkshire
- Fire: North Yorkshire
- Ambulance: Yorkshire
- UK Parliament: Scarborough and Whitby

East Ayton is a village and civil parish in the county of North Yorkshire, England.

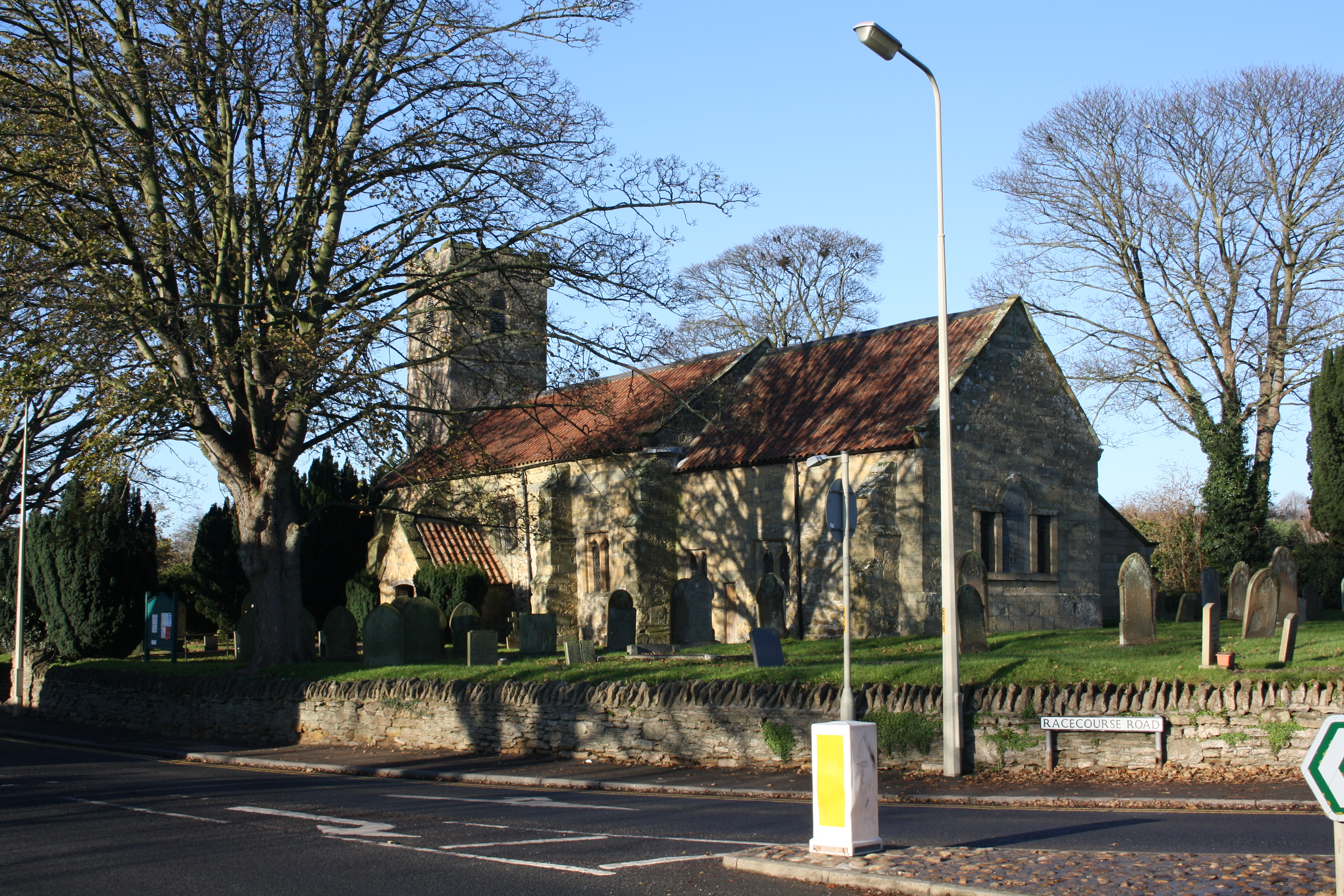
St John the Baptist's Church

According to the 2011 UK census, East Ayton parish had a population of 1,678, a reduction on the 2001 UK census figure of 1,687.

From 1974 to 2023 it was part of the Borough of Scarborough. It is now administered by the unitary North Yorkshire Council.

The name Ayton derives from the Old English ēatūn meaning 'settlement on a river'.

Forge Valley C.C., the local cricket club for East and West Ayton, were the national Village Cup champions in 1986, winning the competition at Lord's.

== Notable people ==
John Fendley, aka Fenners of Soccer AM fame, grew up in the village and was a pupil at Raincliffe School.

Gavin Williamson MP, a former Secretary of State for Defence, was raised in East Ayton and attended the local primary school.

== See also ==
- Listed buildings in East Ayton
