= Ebenezer, Virginia =

Unincorporated community in Virginia, US

Coordinates: 36°49′02″N 79°11′26″W

Ebenezer is an unincorporated community in Pittsylvania County, in the U.S. state of Virginia.
