= Ebeneser Chapel, Ammanford =

Chapel in Ammanford, Carmarthenshire, Wales

Ebenezer Welsh Baptist Church
- Ebenezer Welsh Baptist Church
- 51.7914°N 3.9887°W
- Location: Lloyd Street, Ammanford, Carmarthenshire
- Country: Wales
- Denomination: Baptist

History
- Founded: 1849

Architecture
- Architectural type: Chapel
- Style: Early 19th century
- Completed: 1851

Ebeneser is a Baptist chapel in Ammanford, Carmarthenshire, Wales. Services at Ebeneser are conducted in the Welsh language.

== Early history ==
The chapel was founded in 1849 by Baptists who had previously worshipped at neighbouring Llandyfan and Saron. The earliest meetings are said to have taken place in a house in Field Street, with thirteen members in the first instance. The following year, a new chapel which was named Ebeneser was built near Quay Street, adjacent to a property known as Primrose Cottage. Primrose Cottage was subsequently acquired by the chapel and served as the chapel caretaker's residence until it was demolished in the 1960s and replaced by a car park. The Rev. Daniel Jones of Felinfoel supported the church in its early years, baptising three female members in February 1850 and chairing the committee which oversaw the building of the chapel.

The first minister was Dafydd Morris, a native of Pembrokeshire whose pastorate included Ebeneser and Soar, Llandyfan. Morris was minister for three years. The second minister, from 1862 until 1867, was Dafydd Williams.

== Ministry of T. F. Williams (1867–1907) ==
In 1867, the Rev. T. F. Williams commenced his long ministry at Ebeneser. The pastorate included Saron, Llandybie, until 1891, but thereafter Williams restricted his ministry to Ebeneser alone. At the start of Williams's ministry there were around fifty members, but by the time of his retirement in 1907 the membership numbered 670. During these decades the population grew rapidly as Cross Inn, renamed Ammanford in the 1880s, became a major centre of the anthracite coal trade. The chapel building proved to be too small, resulting in Ebeneser's being rebuilt and enlarged in 1877. Ebeneser was again extended in 1895. In 1907, on completion of forty years as minister, Williams was presented with a testimonial on behalf of the congregation "as a token of their regard and deep affection".

In the later years of Williams's ministry a number of smaller churches were formed in the locality as branches of Ebeneser. A schoolroom had been located at Pantyffynnon since the 1850s and this was established as a church in its own right in 1904, known as Bethel. Another schoolroom at Penybanc, built in 1893, became a church in its own right in 1912, known as Pisgah. An English Baptist Church was established at Ammanford in 1904 and finally, during the pastorate of John Griffiths, Seion, Tirydail was opened in 1913.

== Ministry of John Griffiths (1908–1925) ==
John Griffiths was inducted as minister of Ebenezer in 1908, having previously served at Ponciau near Wrexham. At that time, Ebeneser had around 600 members.

In 1919, Griffiths was elected to represent Ammanford on Carmarthenshire County Council as a Progressive candidate, comfortably defeating a Labour candidate. A few months later, however, Griffiths resigned his pastorate to move to Llandudno. Within a few weeks, however, Griffiths reversed his decision and returned to Ammanford. He left for Cardiff some years later.

== Later history ==
Griffiths was succeeded in 1927 by R. T. Evans, who came to Ammanford from Newport, Pembrokeshire. Evans was minister for seven years before being appointed Secretary of the Welsh Baptist Union in 1934. On his retirement from that role twenty-five years later, Evans was elevated to the presidency of the union and the annual meeting of the Union was held at Ebeneser, his former church, in 1959.

The poet E. Llwyd Williams was minister of Ebeneser from 1936 until his early death in 1960. Williams won the chair at the National Eisteddfod at Rhyl in 1953 and the following years won the crown at the National Eisteddfod at Ystradgynlais. In 1962, Garfield Eynon moved from Seion, Cwmaman, to become minister of Ebeneser and remained until his departure to Ebenezer, Aberavon, in 1975.

John Talfryn Jones became minister at Ebeneser in 1977 and has served for over forty years. Like many other churches, Ebeneser remained closed throughout 2020 due to the COVID-19 pandemic.

== Sources ==
- Llawlyfr Undeb Bedyddwyr Cymru, Rhydaman a'r Cylch (in Welsh). 1981.
