= First Ebenezer Baptist Church =

Historic church in Alabama, United States

- U.S. National Register of Historic Places
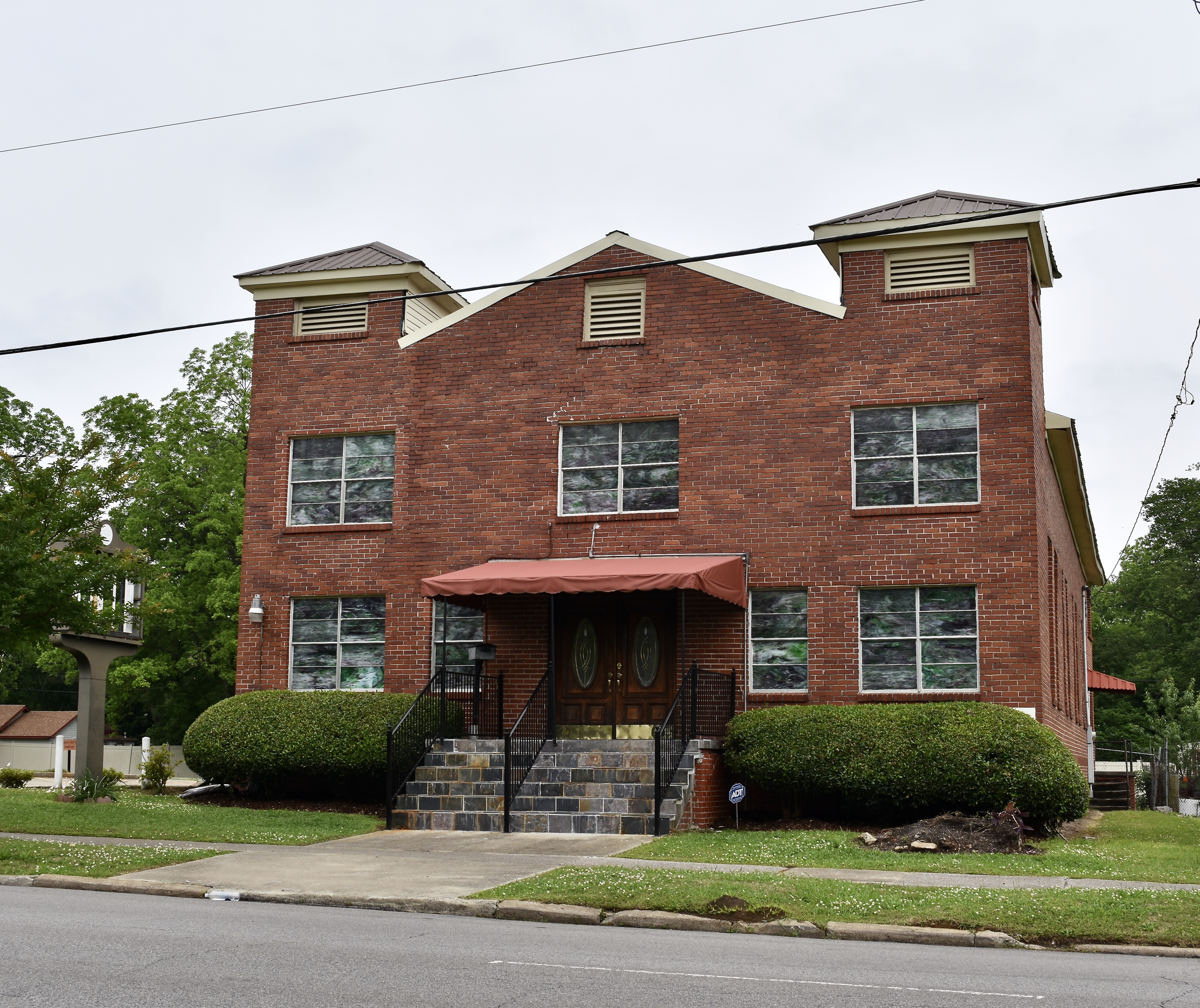

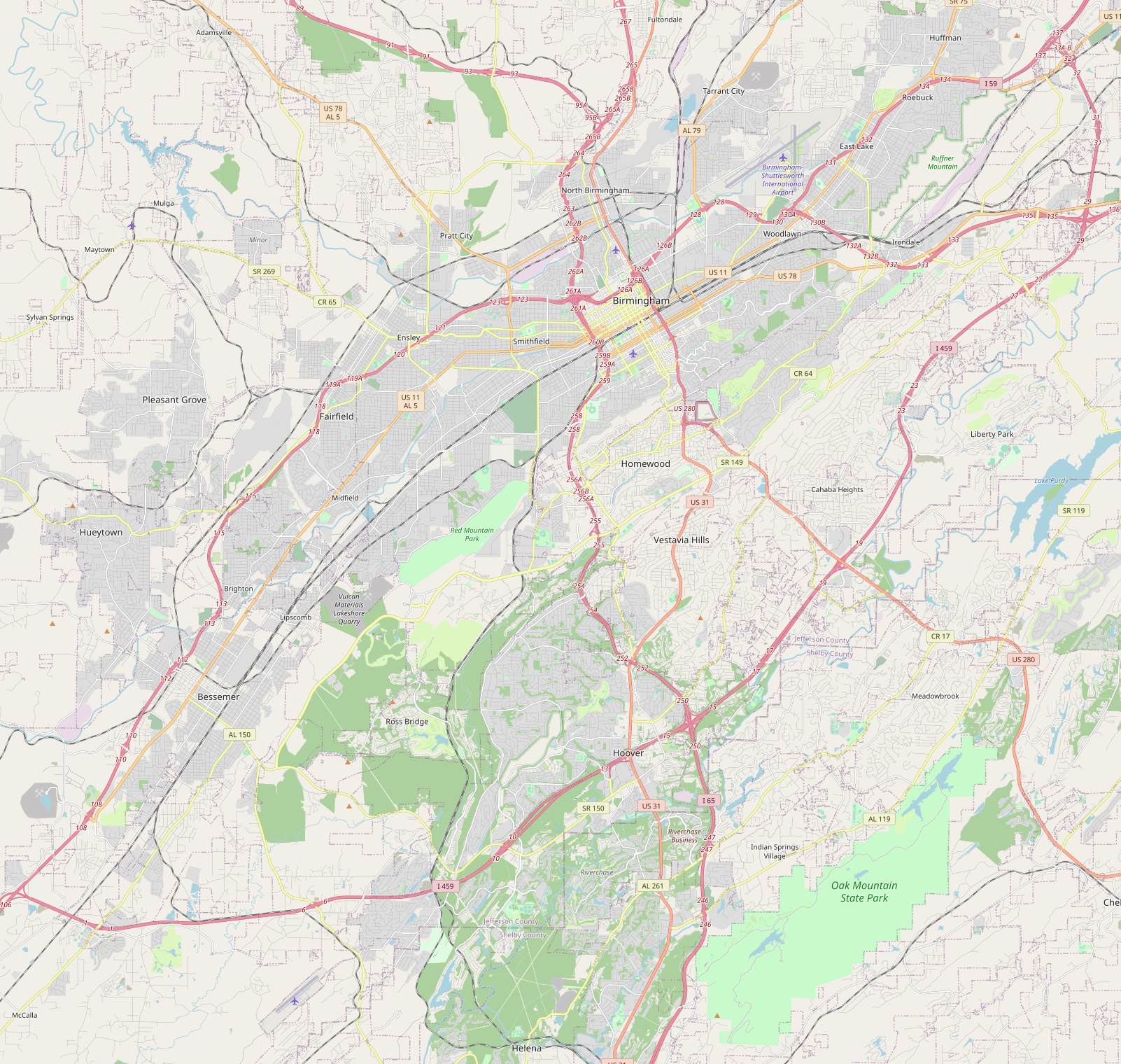
- Location within Birmingham, Alabama Location within Alabama Location within the United States
- Location: 420 Graymont Ave. North, Smithfield, Birmingham, Alabama
- Coordinates: 33°30′47″N 86°49′44″W
- Area: less than one acre
- Built: 1942
- Architectural style: Gothic Revival
- MPS: Civil Rights Movement in Birmingham, Alabama MPS
- NRHP reference No.: 05000299
- Added to NRHP: April 22, 2005

First Ebenezer Baptist Church is a historic Baptist church at 420 Graymont Avenue North in Smithfield in Birmingham, Alabama. It was built in 1942 and the congregation was active in the 1960s Civil Rights Movement. The church was added to the National Register of Historic Places in 2005. This church serves Jefferson County.
