= St Martin's Church, Seamer, Scarborough =

Coordinates: 54°14′10″N 0°26′40″W

St Martin's Church
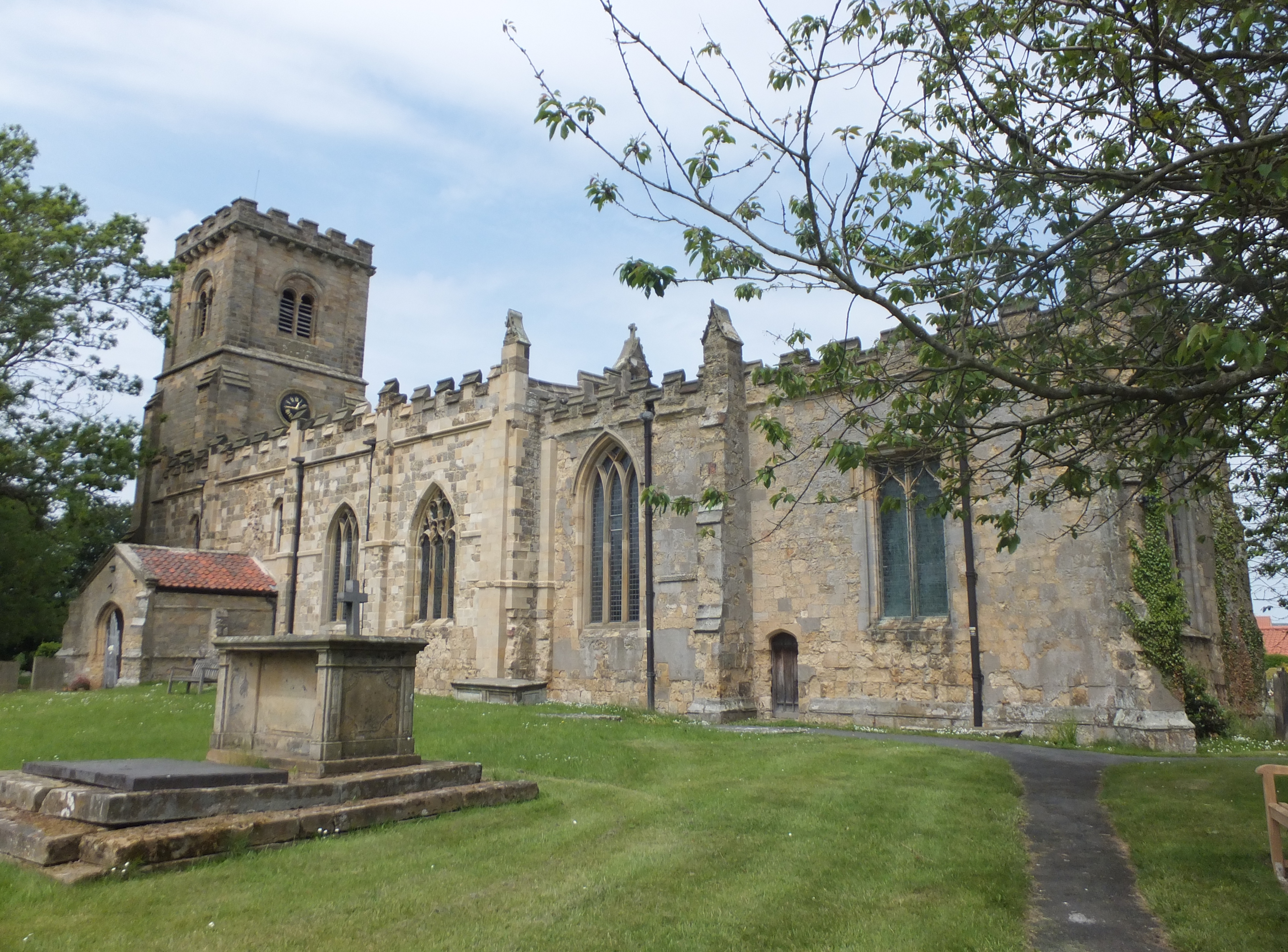
- The church, in 2013

- OS grid reference: TA 01499 83381
- Address: 43 Main Street, Seamer, Scarborough YO12 4PS
- Country: England
- Denomination: Church of England
- Website: www.stmartinsseamer.co.uk

St Martin's Church is the parish church of Seamer, a village near Scarborough, North Yorkshire, in England.

The church was built in the 12th century, from which period the nave, chancel, and lower part of the tower survive. In the 15th century, the chancel was extended, and a north aisle, chantry, vestry and south porch were added. The upper part of the tower was rebuilt in about 1840, then between 1885 and 1889, the church was re-roofed and restored by C. Hodgson Fowler. The building was grade I listed in 1967.

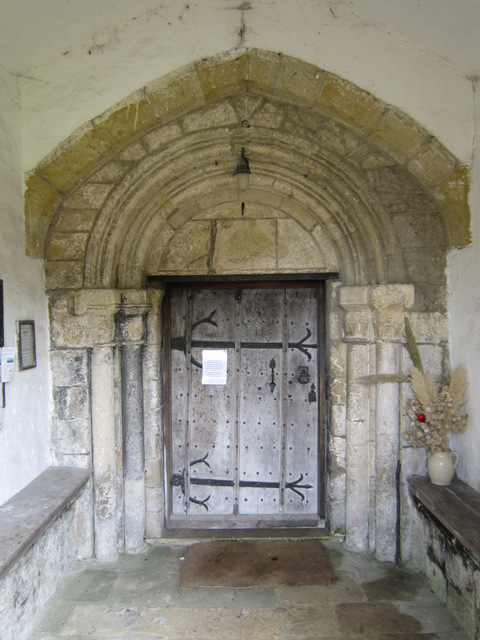
The south door

The church is built in sandstone with stone flag roofs, and consists of a nave with a clerestory, a north aisle, a south porch, a chancel with a north chantry chapel and vestry, and a west tower. The tower has three stages, angle buttresses, a clock face, two-light bell openings under round arches, a corbel table, and an embattled parapet. There are also embattled parapets on the body of the church. The south doorway has a round arch with two orders, scalloped capitals and roll moulding. The studded oak door dates from the 12th or 13th century. On the east gable of the nave is a bellcote. Inside, there is a bell dated 1448, while fragments of 15th-century stained glass are one of the north windows. There is a chancel screen dating from around 1685, and a 16th-century brass memorial.

== See also ==
- Grade I listed buildings in North Yorkshire (district)
- Listed buildings in Seamer, Scarborough
