= Crossgates Quarry =

Quarry in North Yorkshire, England

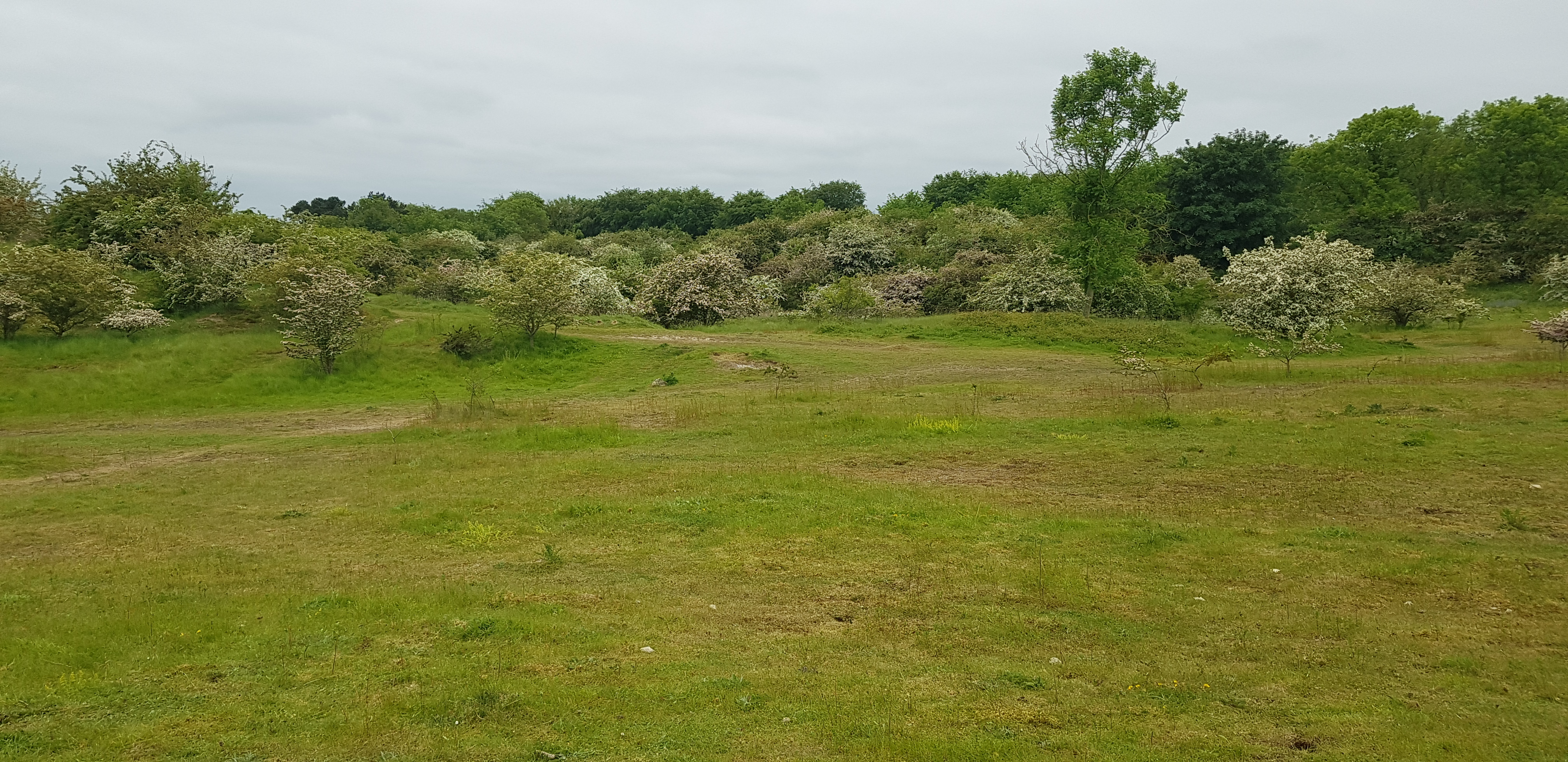

- Location within North Yorkshire

Location
- Location: Crossgates, North Yorkshire, England; 54.242325°N 0.424996°W

Production
- Products: Limestone

Crossgates Quarry is a disused limestone quarry in Crossgates, south of Scarborough, North Yorkshire, England.

== Fossils ==
The limestone of Crossgates Quarry is of the Corallian Group. It was said in 1892 that "most of [the] species [of Jurassic rock] in former times marked Scarborough have either come from this or Ayton Quarries." Blake and Hudleston described the rock beds of the quarry as 2 feet of coral rag, 8 feet 1 inch of oolite and corals, 2 feet of the coral shell-bed, and 13 feet 2 inches of oolites.

In 1901, J. A. Hargreaves of the Yorkshire Naturalists' Union, commented that "Crossgates quarry lies immediately below the Coral Rag, and although fossils are numerous, it is almost impossible to extract them from the surrounding matrix."

== Mining ==
Crossgates Quarry appears on maps as early as 1854, along with 11 lime kilns in the vicinity. In 1857, Anglo-Saxon human remains were found at the quarry and investigated by Lord Londesborough.

The quarry was home to a lime works. In 1932, there was a fire at an engine shed there, which was attended by Scarborough fire brigade and Viscount Downe's private fire brigade from Wykeham Abbey. Scarborough fire brigade did not attempt to put out the fire as they had no agreement to operate outside the borough. Residents near the quarry complained of noise in 1961 when a new plant was being installed.

In 1983, the quarry was mooted as a potential development site for housing, agriculture, or commerce.
