= Ebenezer African Methodist Episcopal Church and School =

Historic church in Georgia, United States

- U.S. National Register of Historic Places
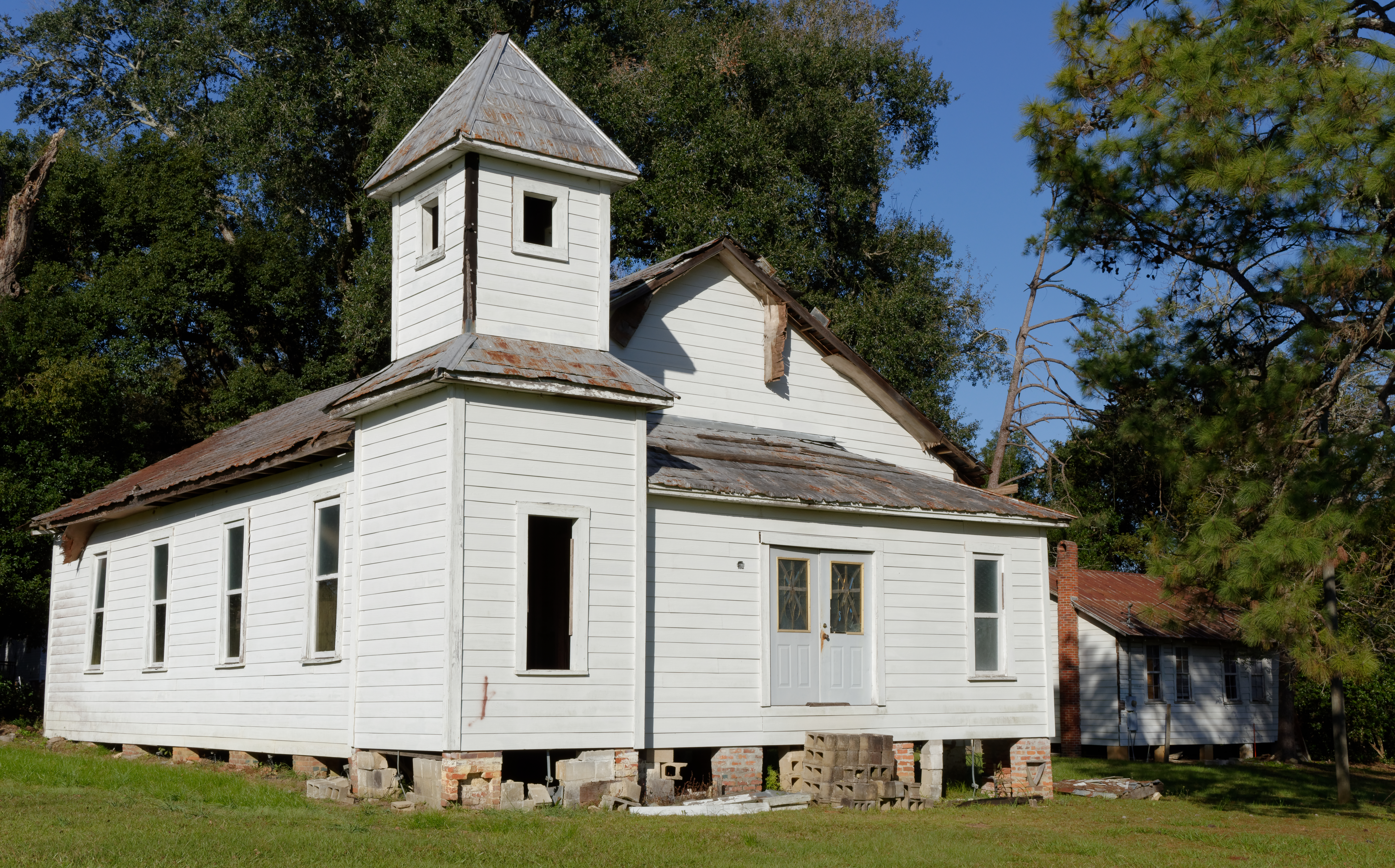
- Church and school

- Location within Georgia Location within the United States
- Location: 232 Martin Ave., Whigham, Georgia
- Coordinates: 30°53′4″N 84°19′45″W
- Area: 1 acre (0.40 ha)
- Built: 1920 and c.1930
- NRHP reference No.: 08000714
- Added to NRHP: July 23, 2008

The Ebenezer African Methodist Episcopal Church and School, in Whigham, Georgia, in Grady County, United States, was listed on the National Register of Historic Places in 2008.

The Ebenezer African Methodist Episcopal Church was founded in the 1860s. It obtained the Martin Avenue property in 1878. The first church built there, a log building, was destroyed by fire in 1920, and the present church was then built that same year.

The schoolhouse on the property was built around 1930, and was the only school for black children of Whigham and the area until segregation was ended in the 1970s.

Regular worship at the church ceased in the 1980s; in 2008 the church was being rehabilitated.
