= Bielby =

Village and civil parish in the East Riding of Yorkshire, England

Coordinates: 53°52′58″N 0°48′00″W

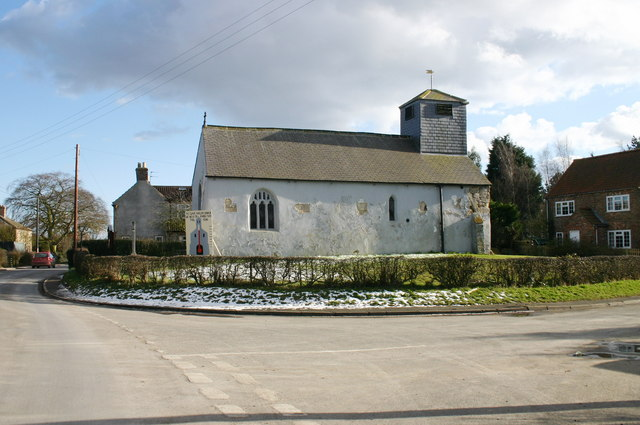
- St Giles Church, Bielby

- Location within the East Riding of Yorkshire
- Population: 258 (2011 census)
- OS grid reference: SE788435
  - London: 165 mi (266 km) S
- Civil parish: Bielby
- Unitary authority: East Riding of Yorkshire
- Ceremonial county: East Riding of Yorkshire
- Region: Yorkshire and the Humber
- Country: England
- Sovereign state: United Kingdom
- Post town: YORK
- Postcode district: YO42
- Dialling code: 01759
- Police: Humberside
- Fire: Humberside
- Ambulance: Yorkshire
- UK Parliament: Goole and Pocklington

Bielby is a village and civil parish in the East Riding of Yorkshire, England. The village is situated about 4 miles (6.4 km) south of Pocklington.

According to the 2011 UK census, Bielby parish had a population of 258, a decrease on the 2001 UK census figure of 281.

About two miles north-east of Bielby, on the edge of Hayton, lie the ruins of an ancient Roman military fortress, an important archaeological site. The University of Durham's Department of Archaeology led an excavation between 1995 and 1998 with assistance from local residents and University of Leeds students. A well, a bath-house and many other parts of the Roman fortress have been identified.

== Etymology ==
The place name Bielby, a village in the East Riding of Yorkshire, is recorded as Belebi or Bielebi in the Domesday Book of 1086. The name is generally interpreted as Old Norse in origin, reflecting the Viking settlement of Yorkshire following the Great Heathen Army’s capture of York in 866 CE. The second element, by, is Old Norse for “farm” or “settlement,” common in Danelaw place names like Whitby and Selby. The first element, Biele or Bele, is debated, with two primary theories: a Norse personal name Beli and a possible Slavic Biele.

The prevailing etymology, endorsed by the English Place-Name Society, derives Bielebi from the Old Norse personal name Beli and by, meaning “Beli’s farm.” Beli, possibly meaning “roarer,” appears in Norse mythology and Danelaw place names like Belby (Lincolnshire) and Belton (Beli + tún). The Domesday Book spellings (Belebi, Bielebi) are attributed to Anglo-Norman scribal variations, with Beli as the likely root.

An alternative hypothesis suggests Bielebi may derive from a Slavic personal name or nickname Biele, meaning “white” in Old East Slavic (bely, бѣлый), linked to a warrior from the birch-rich lands of modern Belarus who settled in Yorkshire during the 9th century. This theory posits that Swedish Varangians, establishing Kievan Rus’ around 862–882 CE, recruited East Slavic warriors (e.g., Dregovichs, Krivichs) while navigating rivers through present-day Belarus. A warrior from this region, characterized by white-barked birch forests, could have been nicknamed Biele by Varangians, reflecting the Slavic term for “white.” This warrior may have joined a Varangian group traveling westward, possibly integrating with the Danish-led Great Heathen Army, and settled in East Riding after 866 CE, receiving land near Pocklington. The resulting farm, named Bielebi (Biele + by), could reflect his nickname, with the village established by 1086. Supporting evidence includes: Spelling Consistency: The Domesday Book and later records (Beleby, Bielby) consistently use “ie” or “ye,” aligning with Slavic bely phonetics rather than Norse Beli, which typically appears as Bel- or Bil-.

Cultural Parallels: Bielby’s historical association with goose farming, possibly supplying Pocklington, mirrors Belarusian village traditions, though goose-keeping was also common in Viking-Age England.

Birch Forests: The white birch forests of Belarus could inspire a Biele nickname, consistent with medieval naming by geographic features.

Challenges to the Slavic hypothesis include the dominance of Norse names in the Danelaw, the lack of direct evidence for Slavic settlers in Yorkshire, and the possibility that “ie” spellings reflect scribal variations of Beli. The term Belaya Rus’ (“White Rus’”) appears later (13th century), suggesting a 9th-century warrior would be identified as Rus’ or by tribal affiliation.

The Norse Beli + by etymology is the scholarly consensus, supported by Danelaw naming patterns and similar place names. However, the Slavic Biele hypothesis, driven by the “ie” spelling and Varangian-Slavic interactions, offers a plausible alternative. Further archaeological or documentary evidence, such as Slavic artifacts in East Riding, could clarify the name’s origin.

== History ==
Great Heathen Army battles

The Great Heathen Army of the Vikings captured much of the area in 866, and, in 876, their remnants settled permanently in parts of the Yorkshire countryside. The Great Heathen Army marched directly through the section Bielby would be established near in 865, conquering what would become York in 866. Viking kings ruled the whole region around Bielby, known to historians as "The Viking Kingdom of Jorvik", for almost a century. In 954, the last Viking king, Eric Bloodaxe, was expelled and his kingdom was incorporated in the newly consolidated Anglo-Saxon state.

The total rent collected from tenants in Bielby dropped from 1066 to 1086 from £56 to £8. By the 11th century Bielebi (Bielby) had almost 10 residents.

== Architecture ==
One home in Bielby is proudly named Bielbyville. Most homes in Bielby have a name plate sign displayed either on the front exterior wall or in the yard (even though the homes are modest in size). Another House at the end of the village is Manor Cottage where many a farmers worked on land next to the house (although since 2009 been empty).

The Anglican parish church is St Giles' Church, Bielby, which dates back more than 900 years. The Methodist revival which swept England in the 18th century still has a visible presence in Bielby, although the old Methodist Church building in the village is now a private residence.

== Notable people from Bielby ==
- John Smith (1807–1895), of Bielby, was a maker of sundials and "a remarkable man in his way".

== Church restoration ==
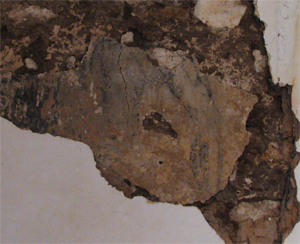
Medieval wall painting of St Christopher in St Giles Church

The parish church of St Giles has recently been restored. Plaster has been removed and sandstone walls restored. Two arches on the outside of the church, and a pillar and skeleton on an inside wall, have been uncovered. Removal of the external rendering has uncovered a history of the church, with pillars and arches now visible that would have been part of a larger structure. Inside, an ancient blue-coloured painting was revealed, showing the legs of St Christopher. The plasterwork had deteriorated to such an extent that when efforts were made to protect it, it crumbled off the wall in fragments. The box pews are among the best-preserved in the East Riding of Yorkshire.

The church was designated a Grade II* listed building in January 1967 and is now recorded in the National Heritage List for England, maintained by Historic England.

== See also ==
- Listed buildings in Bielby
