= Ebenezer Strict Baptist Chapel, Richmond =

Ebenezer Strict Baptist Chapel
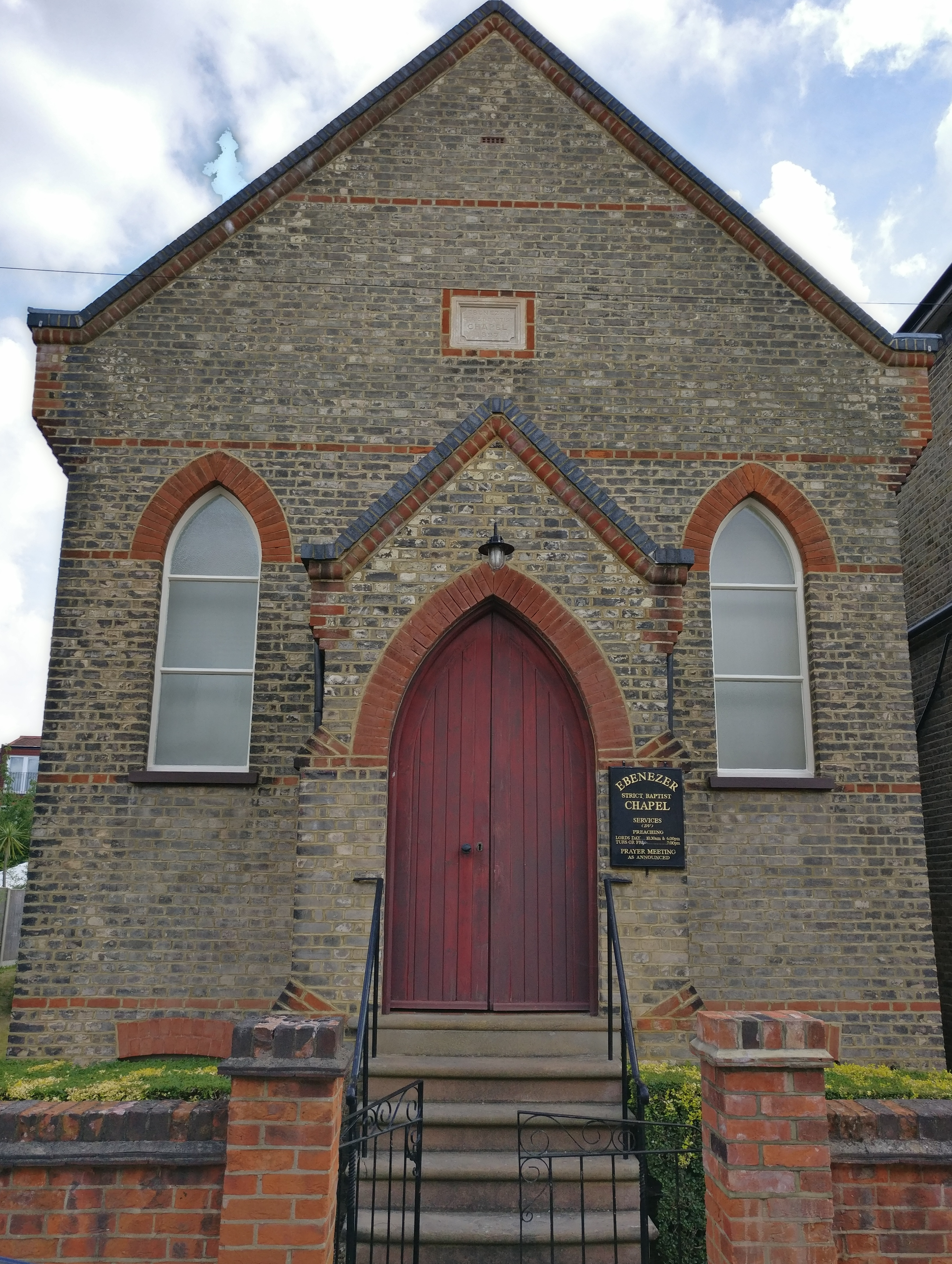
- Ebenezer Strict Baptist Chapel
- 51°28′3.0″N 0°17′55.8″W
- Location: 17 Jocelyn Road, (off Kew Road), Richmond TW9 2TJ
- Country: England
- Denomination: Strict Baptist

History
- Consecrated: 1897

Ebenezer Strict Baptist Chapel is a place of worship, dating from 1897, on Jocelyn Road in Richmond, London.
