= Ebenezer Chapel, Aberavon =

Coordinates: 51.5966°N 3.7824°W

Ebenezer Baptist Church
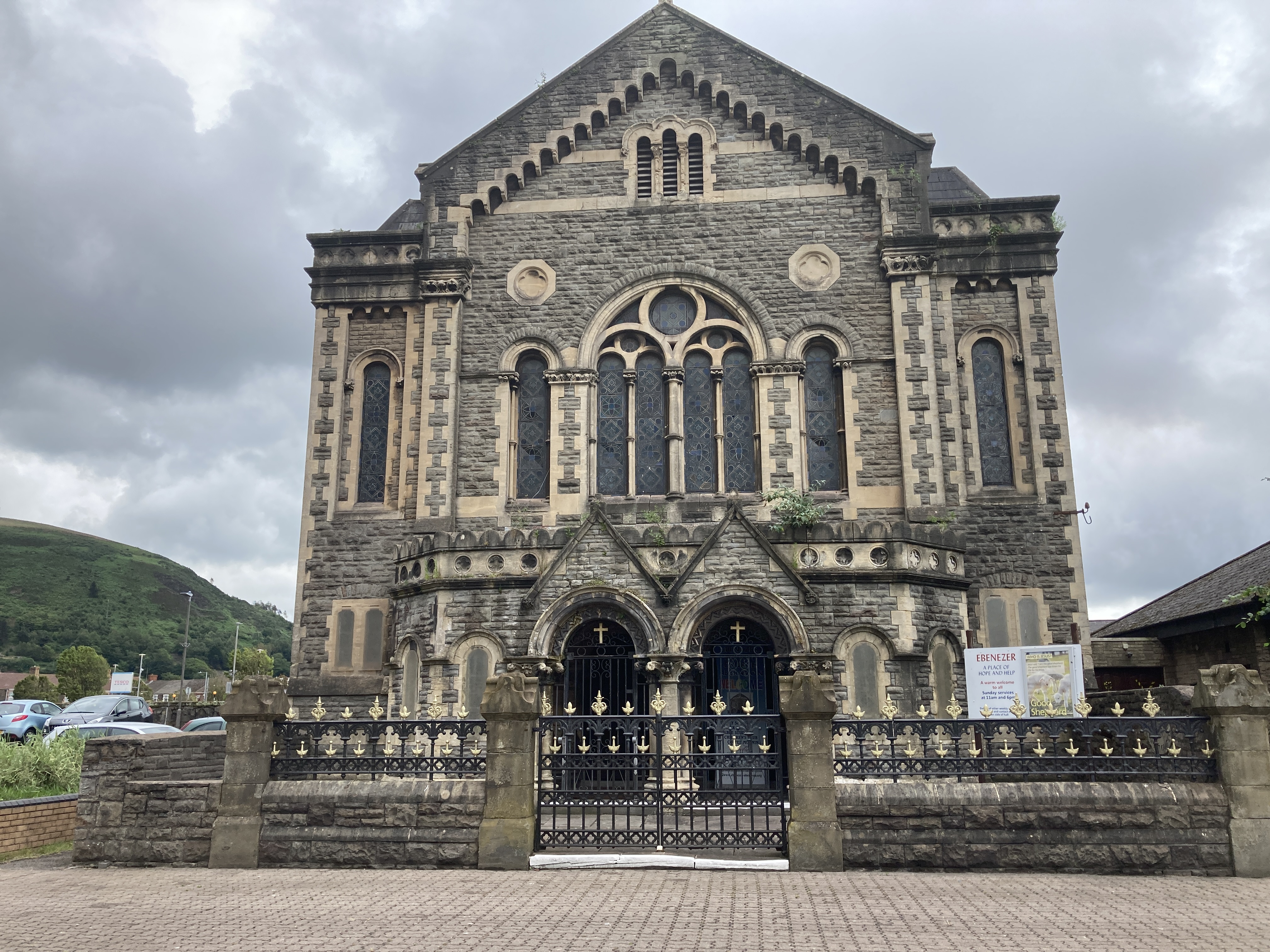
- Ebenezer Baptist Church
- Denomination: Baptist Union of Wales
- Website: ebenezer-aberavon.org

Ebenezer Chapel, Aberavon (more correctly, "Ebenezer Baptist Church"), is a Baptist church in Port Talbot, Wales. Built in 1881, it is located in the Civic Square, where it is the only surviving building from the old Port Talbot town centre to have survived the wholesale demolition that preceded the construction of a new town centre during the mid-1970s; the address was formerly "Talbot Street". It has been a listed building since 1980.

The building was designed in a "scarce Romanesque style" by George Morgan of Carmarthen, a noted architect of Baptist chapels, and was built on the site of an earlier chapel, dating from 1836.

Services at the church have traditionally been conducted in the Welsh language but both Welsh and English are used. Located close to the civic centre, it is used by the local authority, Neath Port Talbot County Borough Council, for an annual carol service and other occasional events.
