= Ebenezer Baptist Chapel, Llandovery =

Church in Carmarthenshire, Wales

Coordinates: 51°59′42″N 3°47′33″W

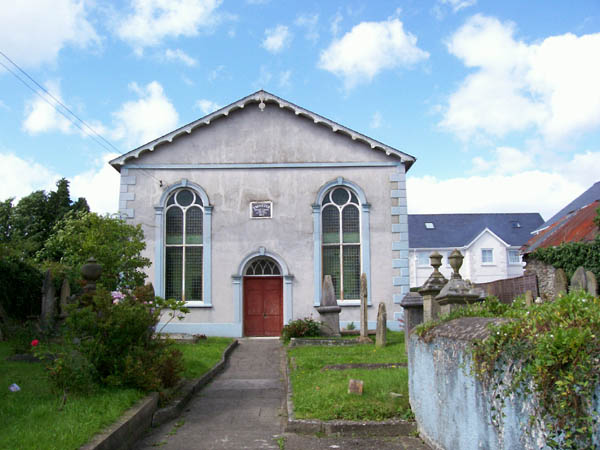
- Ebenezer Baptist Chapel, Llandovery
- Location: Gelli Deg, Llandovery
- Country: Wales
- Denomination: Baptist

History
- Founded: 1844

Architecture
- Heritage designation: Grade II
- Designated: 26 February 1981
- Architectural type: Chapel

Ebenezer Baptist Chapel is a place of worship in the town of Llandovery, Carmarthenshire, Wales. The building was constructed in 1844 and is located at Gelli Deg, Llandovery. It was built as a sister chapel to Cwmsarnddu Chapel, Cilycwm.

Before Ebenezer Baptist Chapel was built, it is probable that the congregation met in a house in Stone Street. The chapel was built in 1844 and renovated in 1884 to 1885 by George Morgan of Carmarthen, before being extended in 1905 to accommodate more worshippers. The chapel is set back from the road with a long forecourt and faces down the length of Orchard Street. It is a simple, rectangular structure with central double door with pilasters, a moulded arch and keystone. The doors are flanked by tall arched windows with Georgian Gothic tracery to the fanlight, which probably date to 1844. The gable front is roughcast with details in painted stucco. At the rear is an early twentieth century rubble stone annex at the northeast corner of the building, with its door, located at the south end, having a red brick surround.

The interior dates from the 1884 remodelling and includes a three-sided gallery with a double-curved front of pierced cast iron in neo-rococo style. This was probably installed by Macfarlane of Glasgow, and the seven cast-iron columns with scrolled caps that support the gallery are also likely to be his. The organ loft is behind pulpit and is arched, with a panelled and balustraded front. The flat ceiling has a small cornice and ornate plasterwork.

It was designated as a Grade II listed building on 26 February 1981, being a fine example of "a chapel designed as an end stop to a street, with galleried interior".
