= Plough (disambiguation) =

A plough (or plow) is a tool used in farming for initial cultivation of soil.

Plough or The Plough may also refer to:

== Science and technology ==
- The Plough, or the Big Dipper, an asterism in the constellation of Ursa Major
- Plough (instrument), a type of backstaff, a device used for celestial navigation
- Plough (unit), or carucate, a medieval unit of land area
- Plough, a device on electric trams powered by conduit current collection
- Plow, a term for backslash ( \ ) used in various programming environments

== Businesses and institutions ==
- The Plough, Gorton, a pub in Manchester, UK
- The Plough at Eaves, a pub in Lancashire, UK
- The Plough, Wombleton, a pub in North Yorkshire, UK
- The Plough Arts Centre, Torrington, Devon, UK
- Plough Inn, Brisbane, a heritage-listed hotel in Brisbane, Queensland, Australia
- Plough Inn (Madison, Wisconsin), a building on the US National Register of Historic Places
- Plough Company, the original holders of the patent on Lygonia, a proprietary province in pre-colonial Maine, US
- Plough magazine and Plough Publishing House, a company operated by the Bruderhof Communities
- Paines Plough, British theatre company

== Other uses ==
- Plough (politics), political symbol
- Plough (surname), with a list of people of this name
- The Plough (film), a 2023 French-Swiss drama film directed by Philippe Garrel
- Plough pose, or Halasana, an asana in hatha yoga
- "Plough", a song by Speedy Ortiz from Major Arcana
- The Ploughing, informal name for the National Ploughing Championships, a major agricultural show in Ireland

== See also ==
- Ploughshare (disambiguation)
- Rotary snowplow
- Snow plough
