= Welburn, Kirkbymoorside =

Village and civil parish in North Yorkshire, England

Coordinates: 54°15′07″N 0°57′22″W

Welburn
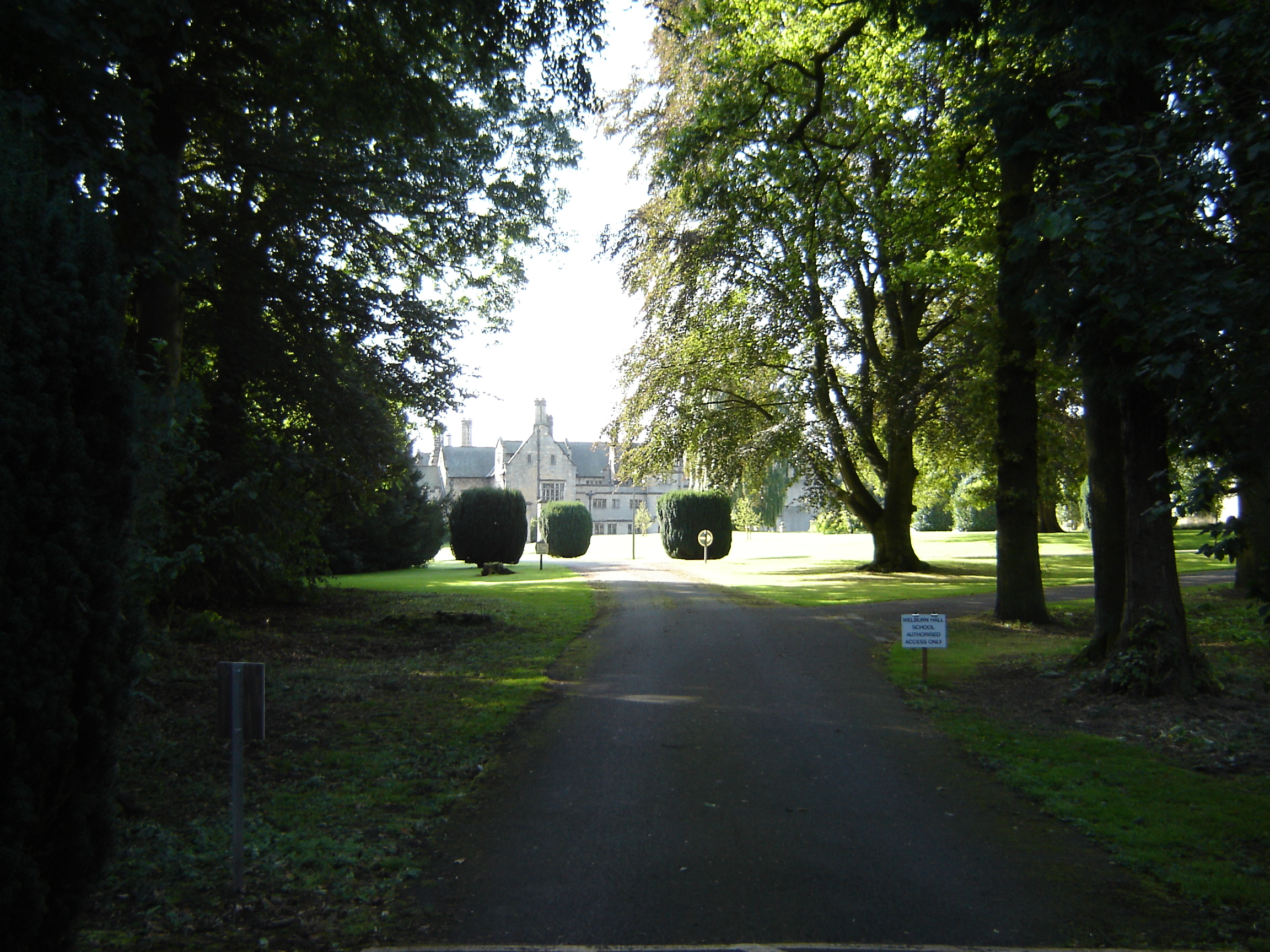
- Welburn Hall School

- Location within North Yorkshire
- Population: 80 (2021 census)
- OS grid reference: SE 681 844
- Civil parish: Welburn
- Unitary authority: North Yorkshire
- Ceremonial county: North Yorkshire
- Region: Yorkshire and the Humber
- Country: England
- Sovereign state: United Kingdom
- Post town: York
- Postcode district: YO62
- Police: North Yorkshire
- Fire: North Yorkshire
- Ambulance: Yorkshire
- UK Parliament: Thirsk and Malton

Welburn is a village and civil parish in North Yorkshire, in England, 2 miles south-west of Kirkbymoorside and about 24 miles from York. In 2021 the population of the civil parish was 80. The population of the parish was estimated at 60 in 2012.

The civil parish includes the lower part of Kirkdale, including Kirkdale Cave and the parish church of St Gregory's Minster, both about 0.6 miles (1 km) north of the village. The Slingsby Aviation works and airstrip lie south-east of the village.

Welburn was historically a township in the parish of Kirkdale and became a civil parish in 1866. In 1870–72, John Marius Wilson's Imperial Gazetteer of England and Wales described Welburn like this:

"WELBURN, a township in Kirkdale parish, N. R. Yorkshire; 5 miles E of Helmsley. Acres, 1,582. Real property, £2,846. Pop., 121. Houses, 20."

From 1974 to 2023, it was part of the district of Ryedale, it is now administered by the unitary North Yorkshire Council.

The name Welburn derives from the Old English wellaburna meaning 'spring by a stream'.

== Welburn Hall ==
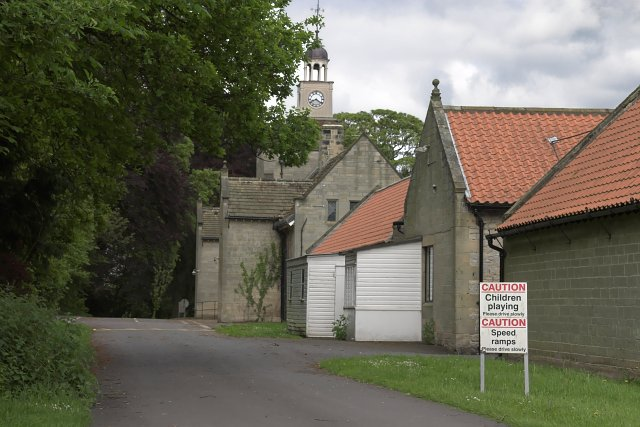
Welburn Hall School

Welburn Hall is a grade II listed house, designed by Walter Brierley and incorporating a 17th-century wing. It is now a school which caters for children and young people aged eight to 19 who have a range of special educational needs. The house has been grade II listed since 1985.

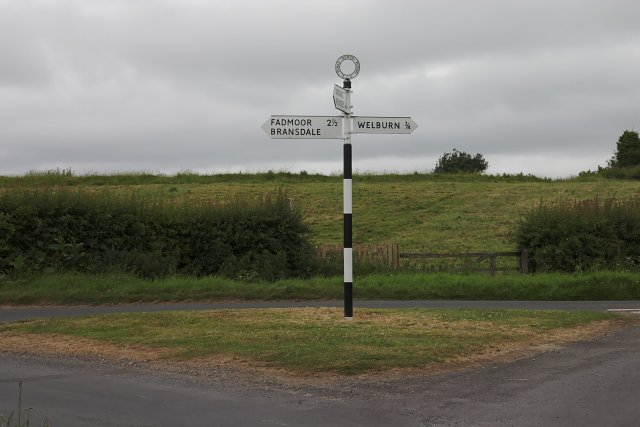
Crossroads sign Old cast iron North Riding of Yorkshire sign

== Early Welburn Families ==
=== Potter and Franklin ===
Richard Potter was born in 1786 and became a miller occupying Howkeld Mill. In 1784, William Franklin was born in Welburn. He worked as a cartwright and in 1861, he was lodging with another carpenter, John Clarke, who was employing 3 apprentices.

=== Parker, Snowdon and Foxton ===
Thomas Parker (1744–1817), who was probably born in Edmundbyres, Durham, appeared in Yorkshire during the mid-18th Century. He married Hannah Boyes (1754–1841) who was born in Wombleton and they took up farming in Welburn. Christopher Foxton (1745–1810) and his wife, Ann Hodgson, farmed 200 acres. By 1840, their son, John Foxton (1773–1835) and Grace Brown (1783–1835) had taken over this farm. John and Grace were born in Welburn and married in 1803. The widowed Grace and her two sons, Richard Foxton (born 1817) and Hartas Foxton (1822–1904)continued to run the farm through the 1850s. By 1861, Hartas had taken over Welburn Grange. Leonard Snowdon (born 1764) followed by Mathew Snowdon (1795–1851) occupied West Ings. The Parker, Foxton and Snowdon families became intertwined by marriage during the 1800s, producing many descendants who contributed to the growth and prosperity of Yorkshire and beyond. Thomas Parker and Hannah Boyes produced five children:

- Thomas Parker married Jane Winspear
- Elizabeth [aka. Betty] Parker married Joseph Worthy
- Margaret [aka. Peggy] Parker married William Foxton
- John Parker married Ann Richardson
- Joseph Parker married Lavinia Fenwick

During the 1840s and 1850s, the three Parker brothers were tenant farmers on individual acreages and occupied adjacent homes in Welburn Village. They produced twelve sons and eight daughters in total. Thomas Parker and Jane Winspear's son, another Thomas Parker (1811–1897), married Jane Foxton and worked as a cattle jobber in nearby Wombleton. This couple produced seven sons and five daughters. Their move back to Welburn possibly coincided with the death of Thomas' father in 1853 and by 1881, Thomas and Jane, now "cattle dealers", had moved to Sonley Hill, Welburn. Hartas Foxton was born in Welburn in 1822. By 1861, he occupied Welburn Grange with his wife, Elizabeth, farming 210 acres and employing six servants.

John (Jack) Parker (1822–1890), son of John Parker and Ann Richardson, became the original Sinnington Huntsman. He was described as an eccentric character "whose witty anecdotes are still remembered". Jack Parker is also noted as the legendary huntsman who "blooded" the Viscount of Helmsley.

According to available records, Frederick Parker (1833–1912), son of Thomas Parker and Jane Foxton, is the only Parker to have a direct connection to Welburn Hall. During the 1860s and 1870s, Frederick and Jane Snowdon were farming 150 acres at nearby Muscoates. By 1881, Frederick and his second wife, Mary, were farming 113 acres in Welburn. West Ings, a 234-acre farm, adjacent to Welburn Hall, was the birthplace of Frederick's former wife, Jane Snowdon. In 1881, West Ings was occupied by her brother, William Snowdon and his wife, Hannah. By 1901, Frederick Parker was again a widower, farming Welburn Hall acreage until about 1910. He moved to Wombleton where he died in 1912.

In 1859, Joseph and Thomas Parker, sons of Thomas Parker and Jane Foxton, left Welburn intent upon making their fortune. By 1860, they had arrived in Port Chalmers, New Zealand aboard the Ocean Chief and soon after headed to the gold diggings at Gabriel's Gully. Like many before them, Thomas and Joseph must have found slim pickings because they eventually returned to farming, this time on New Zealand's South Island. Thomas did not marry. He became a successful horse breeder often travelling to Australia to sell his stock. Joseph married Catherine Buchanan Crerar. They had five sons and two daughters, thus establishing the Parker family in New Zealand. In the fledgling New Zealand society, the Parker brother's tales about their former life at "Parker Castle" must have made impressive dinner conversation. No doubt the 'castle' was a tongue-in-cheek referral to Welburn Hall.

=== Barthram ===
William Barthram was born in Stockerley in 1772 and during the early 1800s he moved to Welburn. He became the publican and also farmed 80 acres. His sons, Samuel Barthram and John Barthram, were born about 1811. They remained in Welburn and both became Blacksmiths. John and his wife, Bessy, produced four sons and three daughters and by 1861, John was a blacksmith, tanner and farmer of 72 acres. William Barthram's third son, Richard Barthram (1813–1874), married Mary Parker (1818–1907) daughter of Thomas Parker and Jane Winspear.

=== Lancaster & Flowers ===
Hebden Flowers (born 1790) occupied the 85 acre "Starfits Grange" farm. William Lancaster (1812–1878) was born in Wombleton and he married Elizabeth Flowers who was born in Welburn in 1824. They lived in Starfits Lane and continued to work the farm. Their daughter, Annie Lancaster, was born about 1853 and she married Nimrod Parker (1847–1888), son Thomas Parker and Jane Foxton.

=== Featherstone and Walker ===
In the early 1840s, William Featherstone farmed Sonley Hill. Also during this period, William Walker (born 1796), his wife, Elizabeth Walker and 12 children occupied Welburn Grange. By the late 1850s, Hartas Foxton and his wife Elizabeth (1823–) had possession of the Grange with the help of six servants.

== See also ==
- Listed buildings in Welburn, Kirkbymoorside
