= Listed buildings in Welburn, Kirkbymoorside =

Welburn is a civil parish near Kirkbymoorside in the county of North Yorkshire, England. It contains 13 listed buildings that are recorded in the National Heritage List for England. Of these, one is listed at Grade I, the highest of the three grades, and the others are at Grade II, the lowest grade. The parish contains the village of Welburn and the surrounding countryside, including part of Kirkdale. The listed buildings include a country house and associated structures, smaller houses, farmhouses, a church, a bridge, and a watermill.

== Key ==
Grade	Criteria
I	Buildings of exceptional interest, sometimes considered to be internationally important
II	Buildings of national importance and special interest

== Buildings ==
Name and location	Photograph	Date	Notes	Grade
St Gregory's Minster; 54.263184°N 0.96236°W		c. 1060	The church has been altered and extended throughout the centuries, and it was restored in 1907–09 by Temple Moore. It is built in limestone, and consists of a nave, a north aisle with a chapel, a south porch, a higher chancel, and a west tower. The tower is narrow with a square section, and has louvred bell openings and a hipped roof, and in the wall to the left of the tower is a Saxon cross shaft and quoins. The porch has a timber framed gable, it contains stone benches, and over the doorway is a Saxon sundial flanked by inscriptions. At the east end are three lancet windows with an oculus above.	I
Sundial, Welburn Hall; 54.25265°N 0.95460°W	—	17th century	The sundial in the garden to the south of the house is in limestone. It consists of a sculpture of Father Time leaning over a vase-shaped sundial on a square stone block.	II
Garden pavilion, Welburn Hall; 54.25260°N 0.95539°W	—	Late 17th century	The pavilion is in sandstone, with rusticated quoins, a moulded string course, a moulded cornice, and a pyramidal slate roof. There are two storeys and a square plan. A later staircase leads up to a doorway on the upper floor with quoined jambs, above which is a cartouche. On the lower floor is a doorway that has a rusticated lintel with a blank cartouche and a dropped keystone. The windows are sashes.	II
Sunley Hill Farmhouse; 54.23448°N 0.95583°W	—	Mid-18th century	The farmhouse is in limestone, with quoins, and a pantile roof with coped gables and shaped kneelers. There are two storeys and three bays, a rear extension, and range to the left with one storey and an attic and two bays. The doorway has Doric pilasters, a rectangular fanlight, an entablature and a cornice. The windows on the main block are sashes with raised surrounds and wedge lintels. The lower range contains a casement window and has horizontal sliding sashes above.	II
Tilehouse Bridge; 54.25637°N 0.95710°W	—	Mid-18th century	The bridge carries Kirkdale Lane over Hodge Beck. It is in sandstone, and consists of a single semicircular arch of voussoirs springing from square abutments. The bridge has a moulded band, and a plain parapet with cambered coping. It ends in low square piers, one with a pyramidal cap.	II
Low Pasture House Farmhouse; 54.22582°N 0.96059°W	—	Late 18th century	A farmhouse and cottage, later combined, in limestone, with a pantile roof, coped gables and shaped kneelers. There are two storeys, five bays and a rear extension. On the front are two doorways, and the windows are sashes. All the openings have grooved wedge lintels.	II
Howkeld Mill; 54.25844°N 0.94796°W		Early 19th century	The watermill is in limestone on a sandstone base, with quoins and a pantile roof. There are three storeys and three bays. It contains doorways in the lower two storeys, and the windows are horizontally sliding sashes with heavy milled lintels.	II
Howkeld Mill Cottage; 54.25831°N 0.94813°W	—	Early 19th century	The house is in limestone, and has a pantile roof with coped gables and shaped kneelers. There are two storeys and three bays, and a rear wing and brick outbuilding. The central doorway has a divided fanlight, and the windows are sashes. All the openings have heavy milled lintels.	II
Welburn Hall; 54.25295°N 0.95500°W		1890–93	A country house designed by Walter Brierley, later a school, incorporating the east wing of an earlier house dating from about 1610, and partly rebuilt in 1932 following a fire. It is in sandstone with a slate roof, and consists of a main range with a cross-wing on the right, a 17th-century cross-wing on the left and two parallel ranges beyond. There are two storeys and an attic, with a three-storey porch and two storeys on the parallel ranges. The porch contains double doors with carved spandrels under a segmental arch, and above are moulded string courses, and a coped parapet. The windows are mullioned and transomed. The gable end on the garden front has a two-storey canted and embattled bay window.	II
Lodge north of Welburn Hall; 54.25625°N 0.95636°W	—	1895	The lodge, designed by Walter Brierley, is in limestone, with bracketed eaves, and a steeply-pitched overhanging stone tile roof with coped gables and finials. There are two storeys, and on the front is a single-storey gabled porch containing a doorway with a Tudor arched head on the right return. The gable end to the left is canted and embattled, and contains mullioned windows. All the openings have quoined jambs.	II
Wall, gate piers and gates, Lodge north of Welburn Hall; 54.25631°N 0.95649°W	—	1895	The wall and gate piers are in limestone, and the gates are in wrought iron. The piers have a square plan and are about 3 metres (9.8 ft) in height on a low plinth. Each pier has shaped recessed panelled sides, a moulded cornice, and a ball finial. The wall is attached to the piers by buttresses with gabled tops, the wall to the left incorporating a stile of cantilevered steps.	II
Lodge northwest of Welburn Hall; 54.25317°N 0.95747°W		1895	The lodge, designed by Walter Brierley, is in sandstone, with bracketed eaves, and a steeply-pitched overhanging pantile roof with coped gables and finials. On the front is a two-storey gabled porch with a two-light window, and on the right return is a doorway, above which is a blank cartouche. Beyond that is a two-storey canted and embattled bay window. All the windows have chamfered mullions, and all the openings have quoined jambs.	II
Stable Block, Welburn Hall; 54.25339°N 0.95621°W		1895	The stable block, designed by Walter Brierley, has been converted into a classroom. It is in sandstone with a slate roof, and consists of ranges on three sides of a courtyard. In the centre of the main range is a two-storey tower, flanked by ranges with one storey and lofts. In the centre is a round-headed carriage arch with imposts, above which is a three-light mullioned window, and a parapet with rudimentary turrets, and on the top is a square clock with a cupola. The flanking bays contain mullioned windows, and have coped gables with ball finials.	II
