= Listed buildings in Ingleby Arncliffe =

Ingleby Arncliffe is a civil parish in the county of North Yorkshire, England. It contains 16 listed buildings that are recorded in the National Heritage List for England. Of these, one is listed at Grade I, the highest of the three grades, three are at Grade II*, the middle grade, and the others are at Grade II, the lowest grade. The parish contains the villages of Ingleby Arncliffe and Ingleby Cross, and the surrounding countryside. Most of the listed buildings are houses, including a country house, farmhouses, and associated structures, and the others include two public houses, a, church, a village hall and a water tower.

== Key ==
Grade	Criteria
I	Buildings of exceptional interest, sometimes considered to be internationally important
II*	Particularly important buildings of more than special interest
II	Buildings of national importance and special interest

== Buildings ==
Name and location	Photograph	Date	Notes	Grade
Monks House and Chastleton Cottage; 54.40114°N 1.31290°W	—	16th century (possible)	A house and a cottage in sandstone, the rear wing pebbledashed, with a pantile roof, tile ridges, and stone coping. There are two storeys and four bays. Most of the windows are chamfered and mullioned, with some mullions missing, and there is a segmental-headed fixed window. The original doorway has a flattened Tudor arched lintel with a casement inserted.	II
Park House; 54.38909°N 1.30417°W		Early 18th century	A house and a byre, later extended and converted for other uses, in sandstone with pantile roofs. There are two storeys and a linear plan, with two rear lean-tos. The oldest part, in the centre, has two bays, and contains a doorway and casement windows. The right part has one wide bay on a plinth, and contains sash windows. On the left, the former byre has three bays and casement windows.	II
Arncliffe Hall and wall 54.39531°N 1.30392°W		1753–74	A country house designed by John Carr, in sandstone, with a hipped Welsh slate roof, three storeys and a basement. The west front has five bays, alternating quoins, floor and sill bands, and stepped eaves. In the centre, balustraded steps lead to a doorway with an architrave, a fanlight a cornice and a pediment. The windows are sashes under flat arches with voussoirs, those in the ground floor with hood moulds. To the left are the remains of a later single-storey wing. In the right return is a Diocletian window and a Venetian window. The garden front has a rusticated basement, and a central perron leading to a doorway with a Roman Doric doorcase, engaged columns and a pediment. On the right is a conservatory, and a wall with a pedimented gateway.	I
Stable block, Arncliffe Hall; 54.39498°N 1.30302°W		c. 1754	The stable block was designed by John Carr, it was altered in 1905, and later converted for other uses. It is in sandstone with pantile roofs, and consists of four ranges round a rectangular courtyard. The main front has a modillion eaves cornice, an impost band, two storeys and seven bays. The middle three bays contain a carriage arch flanked by round-arched windows. The bays flanking these are pedimented, and contain round-arched recesses and doorways with fanlights. Short walls link the range to single-storey two-bay pavilions.	II*
Forecourt and garden walls, Arncliffe Hall; 54.39549°N 1.30399°W		Mid 18th century	The walls are in sandstone with flat copings. The wall running northeast has a cornice and ball finials, it contains a rusticated round-arched gateway, and an entrance with rusticated gate piers. The wall running northwest contains three gateways with keystones.	II*
Ingleby Cross Post Office; 54.39939°N 1.30908°W		18th century	A house and a shop that were extended to the left in the 19th century, with two storeys, two bays in each part, and pantile roofs with stone coping. The newer part is in sandstone, and the earlier part is in red brick, with a stepped and corbelled cornice. It contains a bow window, sashes and casements.	II
Gates, piers and railings south of The Cleveland Tontine Inn; 54.38719°N 1.31826°W	—	18th century	The railings and gates are in wrought iron, the railings on a sandstone plinth, ending in a pier with a pyramidal cap. The gates have taller piers, with sides panels and an elaborate overthrow, decorated with scrolls, spirals, flowers and initials.	II
Norwood Farmhouse and outbuilding 54.39744°N 1.30219°W		Late 18th century	The farmhouse is in sandstone with a pantile roof and stone ridges. There are two storeys, three bays, and recessed gabled single-storey wings. In the centre is a doorway with a bracketed cornice. The windows on the front are sashes, those flanking and above the doorway with round-arched heads, and the others with flat heads, extended lintels and keystones. In the left wing is a horizontally-sliding sash window, and the right wing extends into a byre range.	II
The Cleveland Tontine Inn; 54.38728°N 1.31798°W		1802	The inn is in sandstone, the rear wing whitewashed, with hipped Lakeland slate roofs. There are two storeys and a basement, a front of five bays, and a rear wing. In the centre, a perron leads to a doorway with engaged columns, a radial fanlight in an archivolt, and a pediment, above which is a tripartite window. The outer bays contain canted bay windows, and most of the other windows are sashes. In the west wing are mullioned and transomed windows.	II
Stable block north of The Cleveland Tontine Inn; 54.38752°N 1.31790°W	—	1806	The stable block, later converted into residential accommodation, is in sandstone with coped parapets, and tile roofs. There are two storeys, and four ranges around a rectangular courtyard. The south front has three bays, the middle bay containing a carriage arch with cut voussoirs in a pedimented panel. The outer bays have round-arched recesses containing doorways and windows.	II
All Saints' Church; 54.39590°N 1.30428°W		1821	The church was rebuilt on an ancient site, incorporating earlier material. It is in sandstone with a Welsh slate roof, and consists of a west tower with a porch, a nave, and a chancel with a north vestry. The tower has two stages, an eaves band, and a parapet with angle pyramids. It contains a re-set Norman round-arched doorway, with two chamfered orders, shafts with trumpet capitals, and a hood mould. Above it is a roundel, a band, and paired round-arched bell openings. The windows in the body of the church have four-centred arched heads, and at the east end is a Perpendicular window.	II*
House northwest of the Post Office; 54.39942°N 1.30923°W		Early 19th century (probable)	The house is in sandstone, and has a pantile roof with stone coping and kneelers. There are two storeys and three bays. On the front is a gabled timber porch, and the windows are sashes, those in the right bay with architraves.	II
Workshop northwest of the Post Office; 54.39947°N 1.30934°W	—	Early 19th century	The workshop, later used for other purposes, is in sandstone and has a pantile roof with a stone ridge. There are two storeys and five bays. In the centre is a cart door, the ground floor windows have fixed lights, and in the upper floor are horizontally-sliding sashes.	II
Village Hall and caretaker's house 54.39877°N 1.30958°W		1910	The hall and house were designed by Ambrose Poynter, and are in sandstone with pantile roofs and tile ridges. The village hall, on the right, has one storey and three bays. On the front are chamfered mullioned windows, and in the gable end is a lunette. On the roof is a cupola, with a square leaded base, an arched open bell stage, and a square ogee copper dome with a weathervane. The house has one storey and an attic, and two bays. There is a central doorway with a pediment, flanking sash windows, and above are two raking dormers. On the left is a single-storey brick extension.	II
The Blue Bell Inn, wall and outbuildings 54.39898°N 1.30883°W		1912	The public house was rebuilt using sandstone from a previous inn on the site. It has a pantile roof with a stone ridge and an L-shaped plan. The south front has two storeys and five bays, and a slightly projecting single-storey right wing. Most of the windows are horizontally-sliding sashes, some with keystones. On the left is a yard wall with a shed, and a single-storey outbuilding range.	II
Water tower 54.40087°N 1.31441°W		1915	The water tower is in sandstone on a stepped and chamfered plinth, with quoins, a double corbel table, gargoyles, an embattled parapet, and a stone-flagged saddleback roof. There are three storeys, and the tower contains a doorway with a chamfered moulded surround, and an inscribed and dated lintel. Above it is a panel containing an achievement and a motto. The tower is surrounded by a parterre of cobbles.	II
