= Ye Old Sun Inn =

Listed pub in North Yorkshire, England

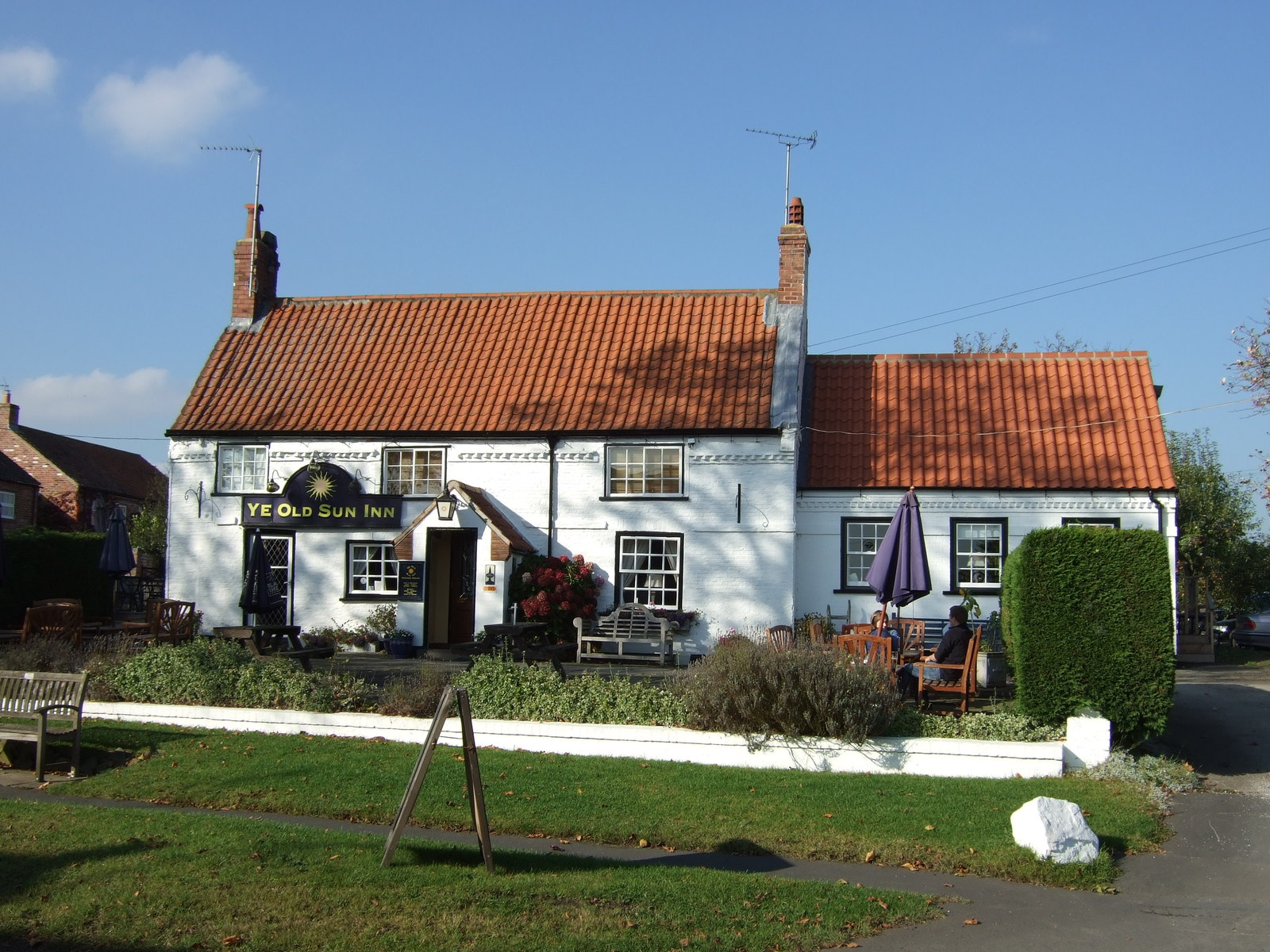
- The pub in 2011
- Interactive map of the Ye Old Sun Inn area

General information
- Type: Public house
- Location: Main Street, Colton, North Yorkshire, England
- Coordinates: 53.89696°N 1.17418°W
- Year built: Early 18th century
- Renovated: 19th and 20th century (extended)

Design and construction
- Designations

Listed Building – Grade II
- Official name: Ye Olde Sun Inne
- Designated: 12 July 1985
- Reference no.: 1316653

Website
- yeoldsuninn.co.uk

Ye Old Sun Inn is a historic pub on Main Street in Colton, North Yorkshire, a village in England.

The pub was built in the early 18th century. Various extensions were added at the rear in the 19th and 20th centuries. In 2004, the pub was taken over by Ashley and Kelly McCarthy, and in 2009 they bought the freehold. They developed the food offer at the pub, and won awards including the 2013 National Licensee of the Year. They also opened a village shop in the premises. Following the COVID-19 pandemic, they reduced its opening hours to two days a week, introduced a still, and started selling spirits and chocolates that they made on the premises.

The pub is built of colourwashed brick, with a floor band, a cogged band above, and a pantile roof with the remains of a stone kneeler on the right. It has two storeys and three bays. On the front is a porch, and the windows are sashes, most of them sliding horizontally. It has been Grade II listed since 1985.

== See also ==
- Listed buildings in Colton, North Yorkshire
