= Cleveland Tontine =

Inn in Ingleby Arncliffe, North Yorkshire, England

Coordinates: 54°23′14″N 1°19′05″W

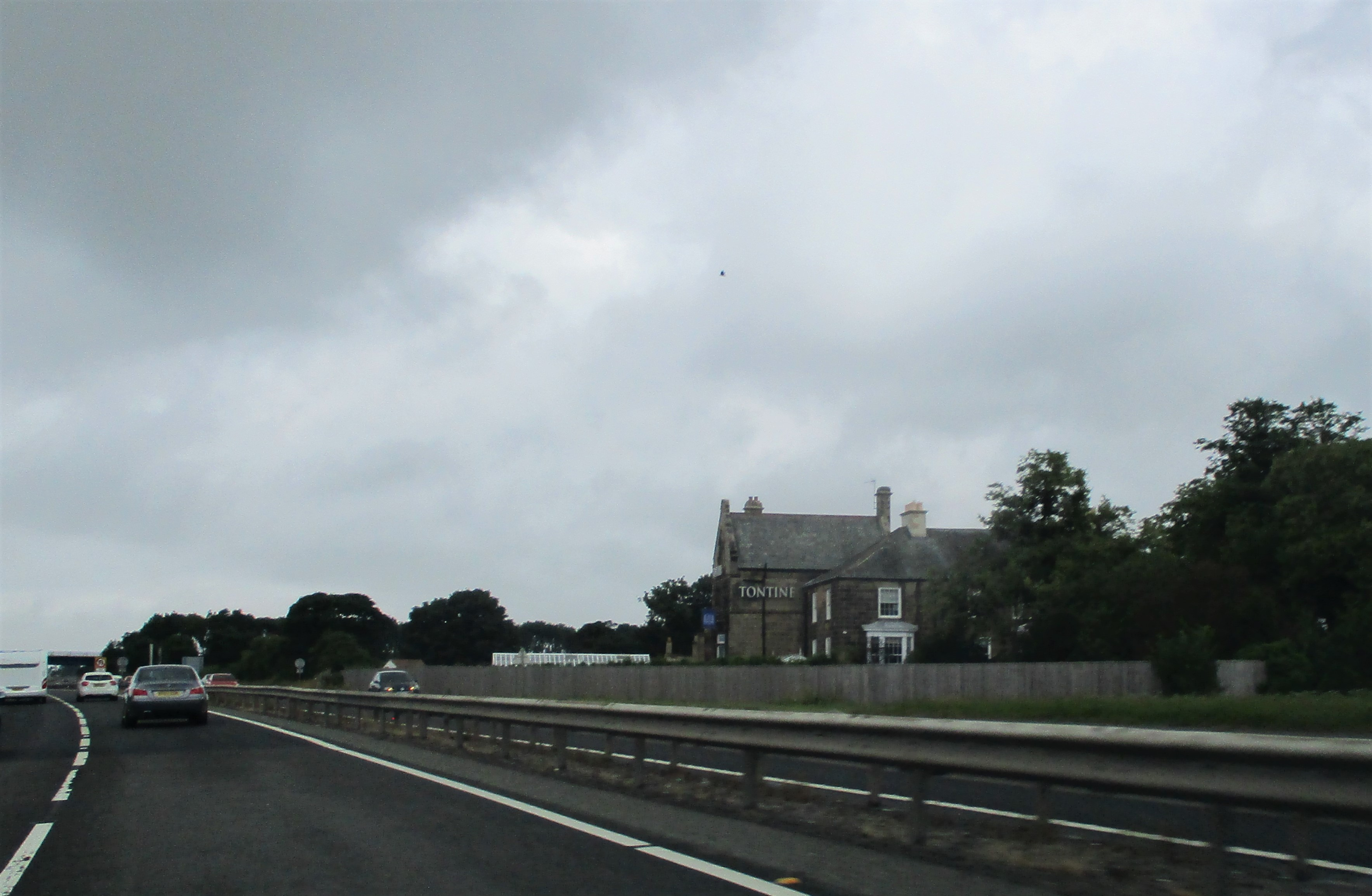
The inn, seen from the A19

The Cleveland Tontine is a historic building in Ingleby Arncliffe, a village in North Yorkshire, in England.

In the early 19th century, a turnpike was constructed from Crathorne, to join the existing road from Thirsk to Stokesley. A group of investors decided that the junction of the two roads would be a good location for a coaching inn. They funded it with subscriptions to a tontine, which totalled £2,500.

From 1827 to 1843, it was a stop for the Cleveland stagecoach, from Leeds to Redcar; from 1823 to 1830 by the Expedition, from Leeds to Newcastle upon Tyne; and from 1833 to 1840 for the Mail from Leeds to South Shields. Various shorter-lived routes also called.

Before 1923, the building was converted into a private home, Ingleby House. After World War II it became a hotel and restaurant. It was purchased by Provenance Inns in 2016, which spent £1,000,000 increasing the number of bedrooms from 7 to 21. In 2025, it closed for conversion into a wedding venue and cookery school. It lies at the junction of what are now the A19 and A172 roads.

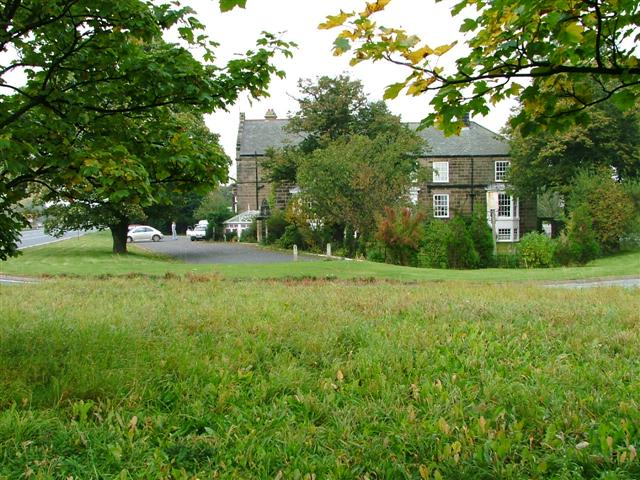
View from the south

The building was grade II listed in 1952. The inn is built of sandstone, the rear wing whitewashed, with hipped Lakeland slate roofs. It has two storeys and a basement, a front of five bays, and a rear wing. In the centre, a perron leads to a doorway with engaged columns, a radial fanlight in an archivolt, and a pediment, above which is a tripartite window. The outer bays contain canted bay windows and most of the other windows are sashes. In the west wing are mullioned and transomed windows. Inside there are three early fireplaces with original iron grates plus a fireplace in the basement dating from about 1600 and moved from elsewhere.

== See also ==
- Listed buildings in Ingleby Arncliffe
