= Arncliffe Hall =

Historic building in North Yorkshire, England

Coordinates: 54°23′43″N 1°18′14″W

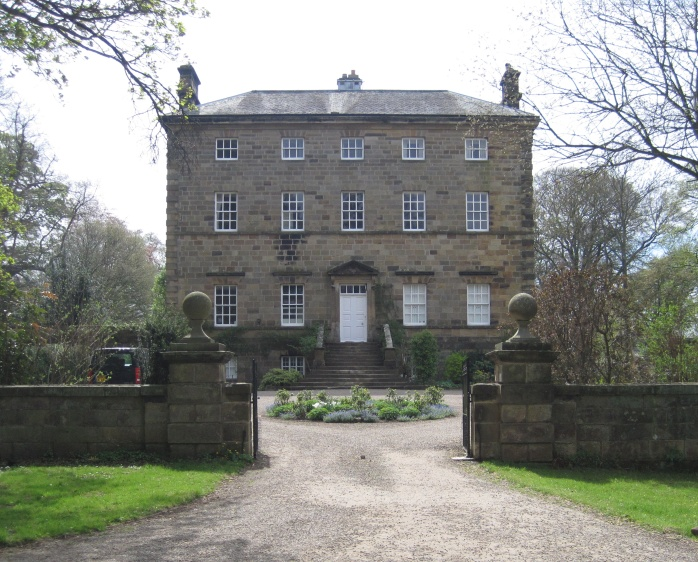
The building, in 2013

Arncliffe Hall is a historic building in Ingleby Arncliffe, a village in North Yorkshire, in England.

The first Arncliffe Hall was constructed in the late 16th century for William Mauleverer, facing north. From 1753 to 1754, a new hall was constructed, on the same site but facing south. It was designed by John Carr, for Thomas Mauleverer. Carr also designed a stable block to the southeast, which was altered in 1905. The hall was grade I listed in 1952, while the stables were grade II* listed in 1966, at the same time as the forecourt and garden walls.

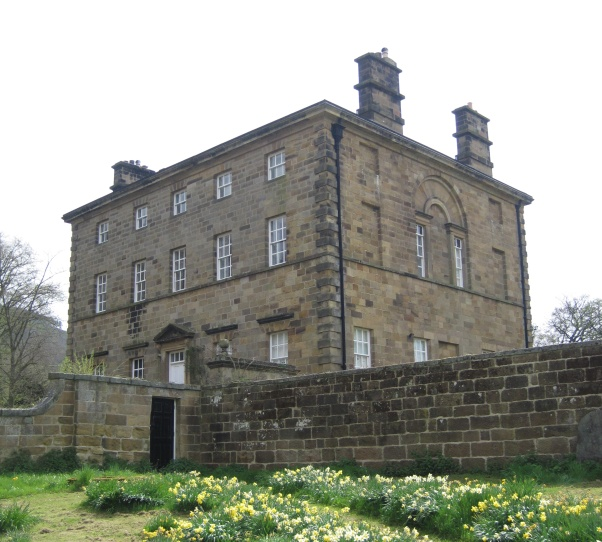
The building, from the south east

The country house is built of sandstone, with a hipped Welsh slate roof, three storeys and a basement. The west front has five bays, alternating quoins, floor and sill bands, and stepped eaves. In the centre, balustraded steps lead to a doorway with an architrave, a fanlight a cornice and a pediment. The windows are sashes under flat arches with voussoirs, those in the ground floor with hood moulds. To the left are the remains of a later single-storey wing. In the right return is a Diocletian window and a Venetian window. The garden front has a rusticated basement, and a central perron leading to a doorway with a Roman Doric doorcase, engaged columns and a pediment. On the right is a conservatory, and a wall with a pedimented gateway. Inside, much of the decoration of the saloon, dining room and library survives, as does the original staircase.

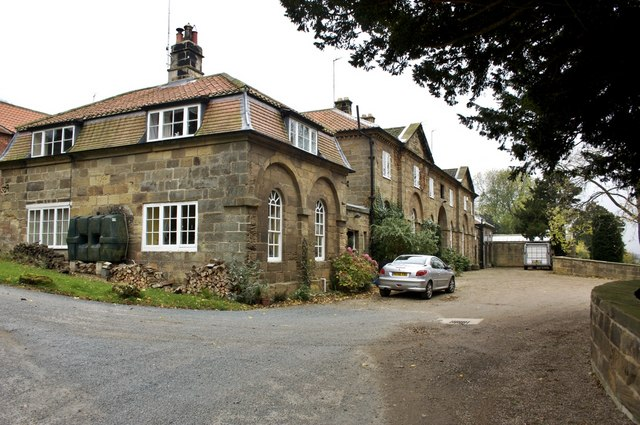
The former stable block

The stable block is built of sandstone with pantile roofs, and consists of four ranges round a rectangular courtyard. The main front has a modillion eaves cornice, an impost band, two storeys and seven bays. The middle three bays contain a carriage arch flanked by round-arched windows. The bays flanking these are pedimented, and contain round-arched recesses and doorways with fanlights. Short walls link the range to single-storey two-bay pavilions.

The garden walls are also built of sandstone, and have flat copings. The wall running northeast has a cornice and ball finials, it contains a rusticated round-arched gateway, and an entrance with rusticated gate piers. The wall running northwest contains three gateways with keystones.

== See also ==
- Grade I listed buildings in North Yorkshire (district)
- Listed buildings in Ingleby Arncliffe
