= All Saints' Church, Ingleby Arncliffe =

Church in Ingleby Arncliffe, North Yorkshire, England

Coordinates: 54°23′45″N 1°18′15″W

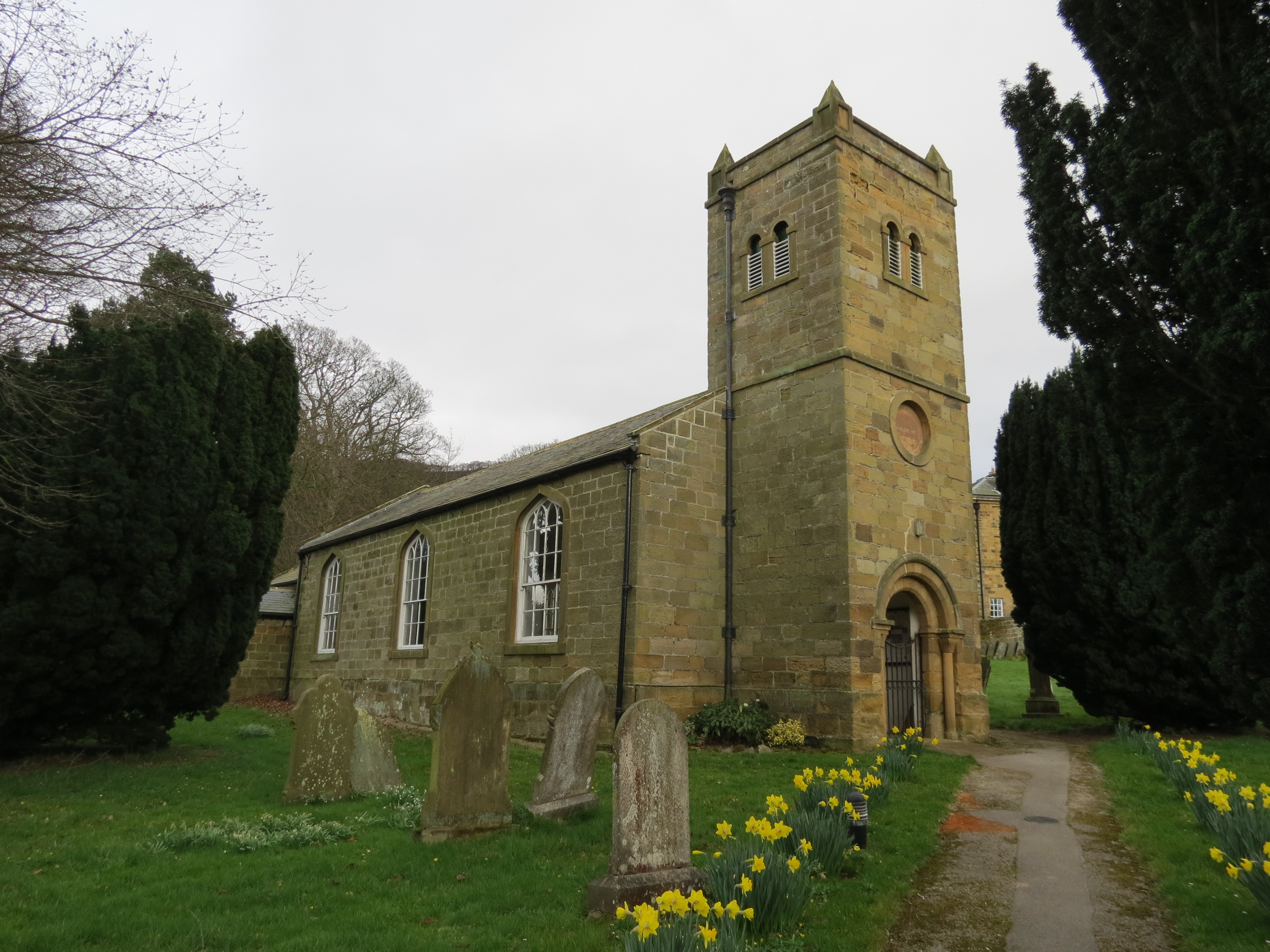
The church, in 2014

All Saints' Church is the parish church of Ingleby Arncliffe, a village in North Yorkshire, in England.

A church has existing on the site since at least the Norman period. In 1808, it was described as an "ancient structure of a simple form and small dimensions", and it appears to have had a west tower. The church was demolished and a replacement was completed in 1821, reusing some masonry and a few architectural features. It was grade II* listed in 1966.

The church was rebuilt on an ancient site, incorporating earlier material. It is in sandstone with a Welsh slate roof, and consists of a west tower with a porch, a nave, and a chancel with a north vestry. The tower has two stages, an eaves band, and a parapet with angle pyramids. It contains a re-set Norman round-arched doorway, with two chamfered orders, shafts with trumpet capitals, and a hood mould. Above it is a roundel, a band, and paired round-arched bell openings. The windows in the body of the church have four-centred arched heads, and at the east end is a Perpendicular window, transferred from the old church. Inside, the original pulpit and box pews survive. There is a plain round font, the date of which is unknown. In the chancel are two figures of knights, wearing armour with ailettes, with hearts in their hands.

== See also ==
- Grade II* listed churches in North Yorkshire (district)
- Listed buildings in Ingleby Arncliffe
