= Howkeld Mill =

Building in North Yorkshire, England

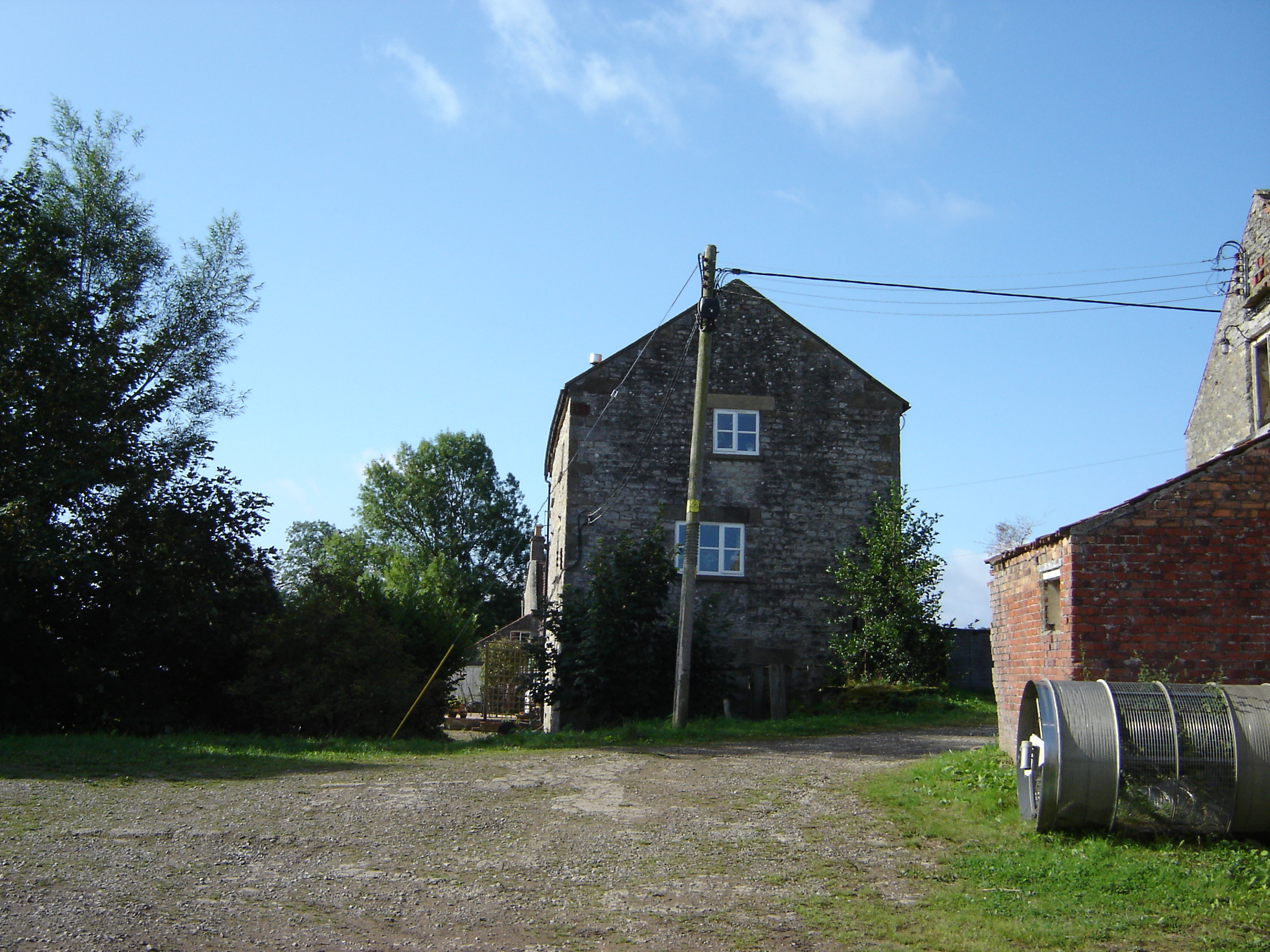
- The building in 2009

- Location within North Yorkshire

General information
- Status: Converted to residential
- Type: Watermill (former)
- Location: A170 Kirkdale Road, Welburn, Kirkbymoorside, North Yorkshire, England
- Coordinates: 54.2585°N 0.9479°W
- Year built: Early 19th century
- Renovated: Late 20th century (converted)

Listed Building – Grade II
- Official name: Howkeld Mill
- Designated: 5 June 1985
- Reference no.: 1149211

Howkeld Mill is a historic building off the A170 Kirkdale Road in Welburn, a village near Kirkbymoorside in North Yorkshire, England.

The watermill lies on Howkeld Beck. A corn mill of the name was recorded in 1545, and parts of an earlier building have been incorporated in the current structure, which was built in the early 19th century. The building was later extended, and in the late 20th century was converted into a house. It was Grade II listed in 1985. In 2020, it was marketed for sale for £950,000, at which time, it had a hall, a dining room in which the mill workings were visible, a sitting room, kitchen, shower room, bathroom, and five bedrooms.

The watermill is built of limestone on a sandstone base, with quoins and a pantile roof. It has three storeys and three bays. It contains doorways in the lower two storeys, and the windows are horizontally sliding sashes with heavy milled lintels.

== See also ==
- Listed buildings in Welburn, Kirkbymoorside
