= Welburn Hall =

Building in North Yorkshire, England

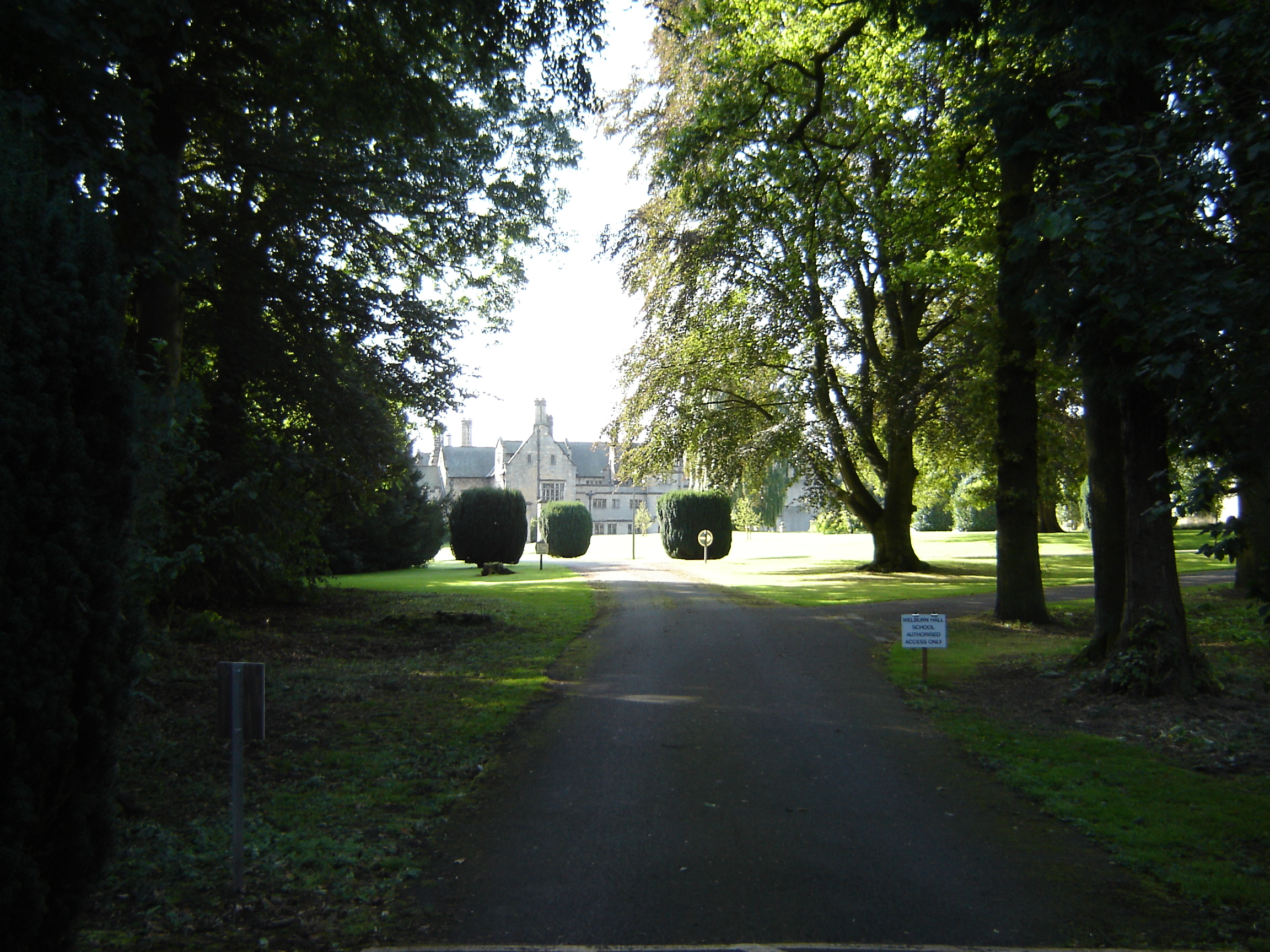
- The building in 2009

- Location within North Yorkshire

General information
- Type: House (former); School (1951–present)
- Location: Back Lane, Welburn, Kirkbymoorside, North Yorkshire, England
- Coordinates: 54.2530°N 0.9549°W
- Year built: 1890–1893
- Renovated: 1895 (extended); 1932 (partly rebuilt)
- Client: Miss E. Clarke

Design and construction
- Architects: Walter Brierley (1890–1893 and 1895); E. Priestley (1932)

Website
- Official website

Listed Building – Grade II
- Official name: Welburn Hall
- Designated: 5 June 1985
- Reference no.: 1149212

Welburn Hall is a historic building on Back Lane in Welburn, a village near Kirkbymoorside in North Yorkshire, England.

== History ==
Welburn Hall was originally a lath and plaster structure, becoming the home of the Strangeway family. In about 1610, Sir John Gibson built a substantial stone addition, part of which is the oldest surviving structure. The hall again passed to new owners by way of Elizabeth, daughter and heiress of Thomas Robinson, who married Digby Cayley. Their three daughters and co-heirs married into the families of Francis Wrangham, Archdeacon of Cleveland, Thomas Smith, and Arthur Cayley, rector of Normanby, who were in possession in 1824. Mrs Wrangham held the manor in 1857 followed by William Ernest Duncombe, the Earl of Feversham, in 1872, but the house was unoccupied from about 1850 to 1880. Joseph Heads, a brick and tile maker, then occupied it, but the house was in a state of disrepair.

The hall was sold in 1890, following which all but the east wing was demolished and the present house and stables were built. The new house was completed in 1893, and was designed by Walter Brierley. The 1901 census is more precise than earlier records. Notably, Welburn Hall was occupied by colliery owner, John Shaw, his wife, Mary, his son, James Edward Shaw, Adela, wife of James and John's three grandchildren, Beatrice, Geoffrey and John Edward Durrant Shaw. Eleven household servants are also recorded. The Hall's new coach house was occupied by the coachman, William Scholey, and his wife, Elizabeth. The Hall Farm was operated by Frederick Parker and his two employees. The house was badly damaged by a fire in 1931, and it was partly rebuilt the following year, the work being led by E. Priestley. During the First World War, Welburn Hall was a convalescent hospital for injured soldiers and in the Second World War it housed children who were evacuated from the Adela Shaw Hospital in Kirkbymoorside.

The hall was opened as a school on 26 January 1951, by North Riding County Council. Dr Howard Crockatt, who was a surgeon at the Adela Shaw Hospital, played a key role in instigating the school's beginnings and many children went from the hospital to the school. A separate classroom block was later adapted from the existing stables and garages to provide seven classrooms. The North Riding council built a school hall in 1970 and a craft/technology room was added by North Yorkshire County Council in 1976. Welburn Hall now caters for children and young people aged eight to 19 who have a range of special educational needs. The house has been Grade II listed since 1985.

== Architecture ==
=== House ===
The house is built of sandstone with a slate roof, and consists of a main range with a cross-wing on the right, a 17th-century cross-wing on the left and two parallel ranges beyond. There are two storeys and an attic, with a three-storey porch and two storeys on the parallel ranges. The porch contains double doors with carved spandrels under a segmental arch, and above are moulded string courses, and a coped parapet. The windows are mullioned and transomed. The gable end on the garden front has a two-storey canted and embattled bay window. Inside, there is an elaborate 17th-century chimneypiece, which has been relocated to the entrance hall.

=== Stable block ===
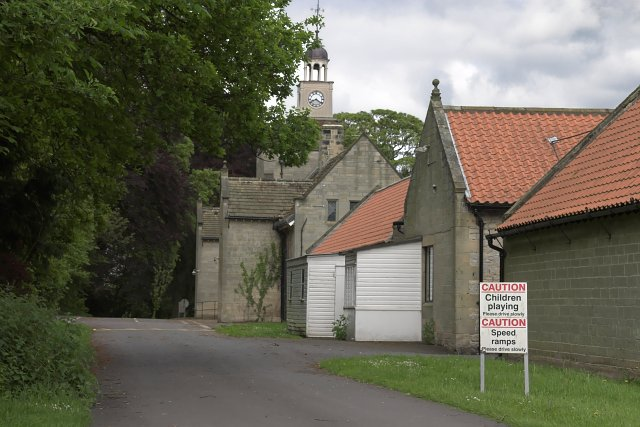
The stable block

The stable block was designed by Walter Brierley and completed in 1895. It is Grade II listed and has been converted into a classroom. It is built of sandstone with a slate roof, and consists of ranges on three sides of a courtyard. In the centre of the main range is a two-storey tower, flanked by ranges with one storey and lofts. In the centre is a round-headed carriage arch with imposts, above which is a three-light mullioned window, and a parapet with rudimentary turrets, and on the top is a square clock with a cupola. The flanking bays contain mullioned windows, and have coped gables with ball finials.

=== Garden pavilion ===
In the grounds is a late 17th-century garden pavilion, which is also Grade II listed. It is built of sandstone, with rusticated quoins, a moulded string course, a moulded cornice, and a pyramidal slate roof. There are two storeys and a square plan. A later staircase leads up to a doorway on the upper floor with quoined jambs, above which is a cartouche. On the lower floor is a doorway that has a rusticated lintel with a blank cartouche and a dropped keystone. The windows are sashes.

== See also ==
- Listed buildings in Welburn, Kirkbymoorside
