= St Paul's Church, Colton =

Church in Colton, North Yorkshire, England

Coordinates: 53.8965°N 1.1774°W

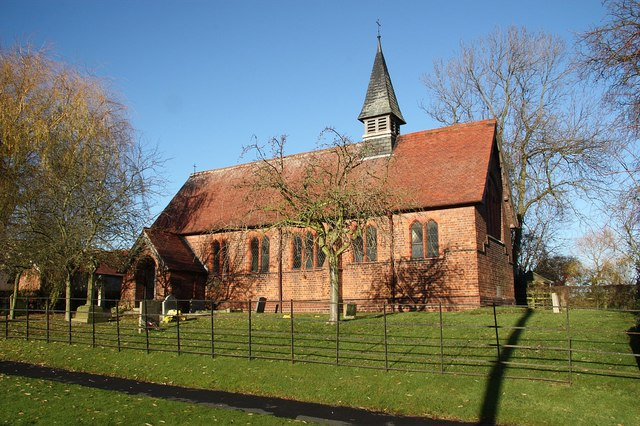
The church, in 2009

St Paul's Church is an Anglican church in Colton, North Yorkshire, a village in England.

Until the end of the 19th century, Anglicans in Colton worshipped at All Saints' Church, Bolton Percy. In 1899, a church was built in the village, to a design by Walter Brierley and James Demaine. It is a single-cell red brick structure. There is a monthly communion service held in the church.
