= Bishopsbarns =

Listed house in York, England

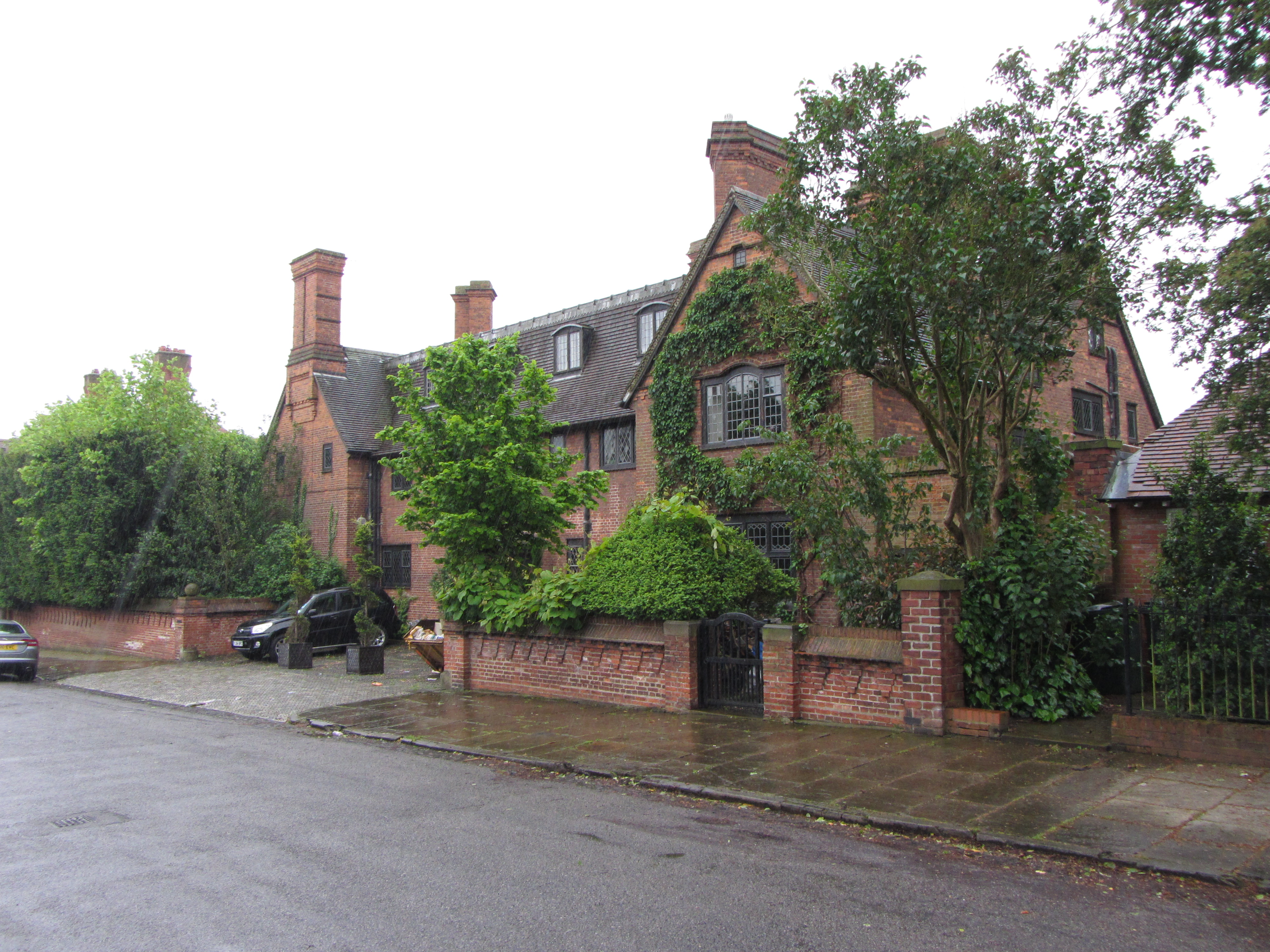
- The house in 2012
- Interactive map of the Bishopsbarns area

General information
- Location: 27 St George's Place, York, England
- Coordinates: 53°56′55″N 1°06′11″W
- Completed: 1905; 121 years ago

Technical details
- Floor count: 2 + attic

Design and construction
- Architect: Walter Brierley
- Designations

Listed Building – Grade II*
- Official name: Bishopsbarns and garden wall and gates attached at front
- Designated: 24 June 1983
- Reference no.: 1256793

Bishopsbarns is a historic house on St George's Place in south-west York, England.

The house stands near the Knavesmire. It was designed by the architect Walter Brierley as his own home and was completed in 1905. Brierley commissioned George Percy Bankart to design the plasterwork, and Gertrude Jekyll to design the garden. Clive Aslet described the building as showing Brierley "at his best", with "great care... taken over the craftmanship". Brierley took the house's name from the fact that the site had previously been occupied by barns belonging to the See of York.

The house is in the Tudor Revival style, inspired by the Arts and Crafts movement. It has two storeys and is built of handmade bricks only 2 inches (51 mm) thick. The roofs are covered in handmade tiles and incorporate dormer windows that bring light into the attics. The woodwork is all of oak. There are wings on the left and right sides of the building, each in a similar style. Most of the windows have mullions and transoms, and some have small panes in a diamond lattice. The rear of the house has a single storey with a loggia.

Inside, the house retains its original decoration. The entrance hall is covered in Delft tiles collected by Brierley, while the other halls are panelled. The dining room has its original wallpaper, and both the dining and drawing rooms have decorative plastered ceilings and stone fireplaces. The ceiling in the drawing room is barrel-vaulted and modelled on one in Pinkie House in Musselburgh. The original light fittings also survive on the ground floor.

The garden is enclosed by a brick wall. Lawrence Weaver stated that "there can be nothing but praise, for though it is small the best use has been made of the available space", and he praised Jekyll's planting, which provides interest throughout the year, and her use of yew hedging. There is a forecourt cobbled with stones taken from the beach at Flamborough. The garden was restored in the early 2010s.

The house was Grade II* listed in 1983. In 2015, it was placed on the market for £2.4 million. The Press later reported that it was the first house in the city to sell for more than £2 million.

== See also ==
- Grade II* listed buildings in the City of York
- Listed buildings in York (outside the city walls, southern part)
