= Ploughshare (disambiguation) =

A ploughshare, or plowshare, is a component of a plough, or plow.

Ploughshare or Plowshare may also refer to:

- Project Plowshare, a former American program to use nuclear explosives for peaceful construction purposes
- Ploughshares, an American literary journal

== See also ==
- Swords into ploughshares, converting weapons to peaceful civilian applications
- Ploughshare Innovations Ltd, a British technology transfer company owned by dstl
- Ploughshares Fund, an American public grantmaking foundation
- Plowshares movement, an anti-nuclear weapons and Christian pacifist movement
- Plowshares Project, an academic Peace Studies collaboration
- The Zap Gun, first published as Project Plowshare, a serialized novel by Philip K. Dick
