= Walter Brierley =

British architect (1862–1926)

Walter Henry Brierley
- Born: 1862
- Died: 22 August 1926 (aged 63–64)
- Occupation: Architect
- Practice: Atkinson Brierley; Demaine and Brierley; Brierley & Rutherford; Brierley Groom

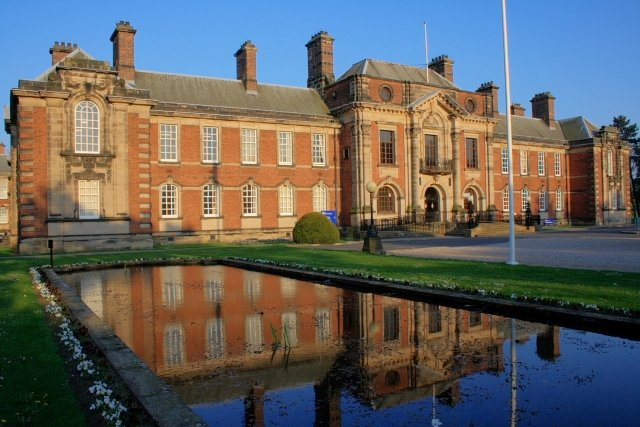
County Hall, Northallerton, 1914

Walter Henry Brierley (1862–1926) was an architect from York, England, who practised in the city for 40 years. He is known as "the Yorkshire Lutyens" or the "Lutyens of the North". He is also credited with being a leading exponent of the "Wrenaissance" style - incorporating elements of Christopher Wren.

Brierley's works include civic buildings, churches, schools and private houses (including his own home, Bishopsbarns) and are located mainly in York, North Yorkshire and the north of England. He was responsible for over 300 buildings between 1885 and the time of his death in 1926. He was the architect for the York Diocese.

The Borthwick Institute in York holds an archive of the Atkinson Brierley architectural practice, a practice that lives on as Brierley Groom, the oldest architectural firm in the UK having continuously practised since 1750. In 2013 Pocklington School unveiled a clock based on plans drawn up by Brierley 116 years earlier and found at the Borthwick in 2006.

A celebration of Brierley's life and architecture in 2007 unearthed the fact that he had designed and built many of the houses and other buildings (such as the Church of St Mary) in Goathland. Simon Groom, current co-owner of architects Brierley Groom, noted that the opening credits of the popular ITV programme Heartbeat displayed large amounts of Brierley's work on screen.

== Key ==
Grade	Criteria
Grade I	Buildings of exceptional interest.
Grade II*	Particularly important buildings of more than special interest.
Grade II	Buildings of special interest.
"—" denotes a work that is not graded.

== Brierley buildings ==
Name	Location	Photograph	Date	List Entry	Grade	Notes
St Philip's Church, Buckingham Palace Road	London	—	1887–1890	—	—	By Demaine and Brierley. Demolished in 1956.
Welburn Hall (remodelling)	Welburn, Kirkbymoorside		1890–1893	1149212	II	The Jacobean west wing was demolished and replaced by a much bigger wing in the Gothic style. Brierley's work was extensively damaged in the fire of 1931.
Mallyan Spout Hotel	Goathland		1892	1316154	II	By Demaine and Brierley, part demolished, rebuilt and extended around 1935.
Northcliffe House	Filey		1892	1316453	II	
St Mary's Church, Goathland	Goathland		1894–1896	1174270	II*	
All Saints' Church, Rufforth	Rufforth		1894–95	1150353	II	By Demaine and Brierley.
Park Grove School	York		1895	1257012	II	
Fishergate Primary School	York		1895	1257844	II	
Nesfield and Mulgrave Cottage	Goathland	—	1896	1174262	II	
Scarcroft Primary School	York		1896	1256667	II*	Generally regarded as his masterpiece.
Burton Stone Inn	Clifton		1896	1259197	II	
The Jubilee	York		1897	—	—	Public house closed in 2016, and was converted into flats.
St Paul's Church	Colton		1899	1225406	II	
King's Manor: Headmaster's House	York		1899	1257853	II	Built as the house of the Headmaster of the Yorkshire School for the Blind.
Brereton Lodge	Goathland	—	1902	1174313	II	
St Oswald's Church	Sowerby		1902	1151342	II*	North aisle built and original north wall replaced with columns.
Thorpe Underwood Hall	Thorpe Underwood		1902–03	1315423	II*	
Haxby Road School	York		1903–04	1257673	II	
Poppleton Road School	York		1903–04	1256903	II	Bomb damaged and restored in 1942.
Dringhouses Primary School	Dringhouses		1904	—	—	
Brackencliffe	Scarborough		1905	1243700	II	
Burrough Court	Leicester	—	1906	—	—	In the 1940s the main historic house was destroyed by a fire.
Bishopsbarns	York		1906	1256793	II*	Home of Brierley.
Bishopthorpe Garth	Bishopthorpe		1908	1166773	II	
Haworth Art Gallery	Accrington		1908–09	1205787	II	Originally known as Hollins Hill.
County Hall	Northallerton		1904–1914	1150967	II*	
Hackness Hall (restoration)	Hackness		1910–11	1148859	I	Restoration following a fire.
Malton Grammar School buildings	Malton	—	1911	—	—	
Sledmere House	Sledmere		1911	1083802	I	Major restorations by Brierley following a fire (original building around 1751).
Acklam Hall	Middlesbrough		1912	1136868	I	Alterations by Brierley (original building around 1680). Restaurant was once named 'The Brierley' and now belongs to Tomahawk Steakhouse Ltd.
The Blue Bell Inn	Ingleby Cross		1912	1151373	II	A pub, the design of which is misattributed by Historic England to George Jack.
Sion Hill Hall	Kirby Wiske near Thirsk		1913	1281486	II*	A private residence. Some similarities with Malton School are evident - the high pitch roof and tall chimneys, for example. The drainpipe is almost identical to the one in Malton School quad. (The white one is on Sion Hill Hall, the black is Malton School).
Lodge to Sion Hill Hall	Kirby Wiske near Thirsk	—	1913	1150972	II	
Water Tower	Ingleby Arncliffe		1915	1294509	II	Commissioned by Middlesbrough ironmaster Hugh Bell. "Sir Hugh Bell built this tower as part of a water supply to Arncliffe and Rounton, AD 1915." is inscribed on the lintel.
Woodlands Hall	Aislaby		1919–1921	1148951	II*	Remodelling and extensions.
Dringhouses War Memorial	Dringhouses		1922	1454164	II	Located outside Church of St Edward the Confessor.
St Chad's Church	York		1925–26	1391178	II	
Goddards House and Garden	Dringhouses		1926–27	1256461	I	Built for Noel Terry of the Terry's chocolate manufacturing family. Together with the Carriage Entrance, it was Brierley's last project.
Carriage Entrance	Dringhouses		1927	1256505	II*	Originally occupied by the Terry family's chauffeur.

The "List Entry" number is a unique number assigned to each listed building and scheduled monument by Historic England. (This is left blank if the building is not listed).

== See also ==
- Exhibition celebrating 60 years of York Civic Trust
- P. Nuttgens, Brierley in Yorkshire: The Architecture of the Turn of the Century (York Georgian Society, 1984)
