= The Jubilee, York =

Former pub in York, England

The Jubilee
- The former pub in 2025
- Former names: Jubilee Hotel

General information
- Status: Converted into flats
- Type: Public house (former)
- Architectural style: Queen Anne style
- Location: Balfour Street, York, England
- Coordinates: 53.9642°N 1.1047°W
- Year built: c. 1897; 129 years ago
- Closed: 2016 (as a pub)
- Client: Tadcaster Tower Brewery
- Owner: Tri-Core Developments

Design and construction
- Architect: Walter Brierley

The Jubilee is a former public house on Balfour Street in York, England. Built in 1897 to a Queen Anne design by Walter Brierley for Tadcaster Tower Brewery, it served the surrounding railway community for more than a century and later became locally recognised as a non‑designated heritage asset. The pub closed in 2016 and has since been the subject of multiple planning applications, appeals and heritage assessments, including its former designation as an asset of community value. After several refusals, an appeal in 2025 granted permission to convert the building into six flats.

== History ==
Tadcaster Tower Brewery had been considering a public house on the site since the mid‑1880s, to serve the growing community of railway workers in the area. To obtain the licence in 1897, the brewery surrendered three others elsewhere in York. Construction began that year to a design by Walter Brierley, and the pub was named to mark Queen Victoria's Diamond Jubilee. His involvement was only confirmed in the 2020s through estimates found in his surviving costings book. The building is a purpose‑built pub in a Queen Anne style.

A licensing report from 1902 records that the ground floor contained a smoke room, bar, snug, taproom, bottle‑and‑jug counter and kitchen, with a function room and seven bedrooms on the upper floor. The 1913 Kelly's Directory of the North and East Ridings of Yorkshire records John Atkinson at the Jubilee Hotel.

The pub was judged to have the worst beer garden in Britain in 2008. It later received a £10,000 makeover by celebrity gardener Charlie Dimmock, adding new landscaping and custom‑made furniture.

The Jubilee in September 2016

The Jubilee closed in 2016, when Enterprise Inns sold the building to Wakefield-based developer Tri-Core Developments. In May 2016, an initial application to convert the pub into six flats was submitted, but City of York Council did not determine it because the applicant was required to market the building as a pub to test whether any viable commercial interest remained.

In July 2016, CAMRA's attempt to have the pub listed was unsuccessful, as later alterations had removed much of its original interior character. The building was designated an asset of community value on 11 July 2016 and re-designated on 14 June 2021, giving local residents the opportunity to bid for it.

In April 2018, a revised application proposed four flats on the upper floors, while retaining a smaller pub on part of the ground floor. The council refused permission in May 2018, citing the loss of social and community space. An appeal was dismissed by the Planning Inspectorate in October 2019.

The developer submitted revised plans in August 2020 proposing three flats in the roof and first floor, while retaining a smaller pub and function room across the ground and first floors. After the council refused the scheme in April 2021, an appeal was allowed in February 2022, granting permission for the partial conversion. In June 2021, The Yorkshire Post reported that the building was up for sale, with a minimum price of £230,000.

In November 2023, a new application was submitted to convert the former pub into six apartments. By mid‑2024 the interior had become dilapidated and vandalised. The council refused the scheme in January 2025, citing the loss of a valued community facility, insufficient marketing evidence, harm to local character and reduced significance as a non‑designated heritage asset. The developer said no offers had been received despite the building being marketed for sale, leaving it empty and vulnerable to vandalism, while objectors argued that its condition had deteriorated following earlier unsuccessful applications.

In February 2025, a second listing attempt, this time by York Civic Trust, was rejected by Historic England, which stated that the building lacked "the special interest in a national context required to warrant listing". In August 2025, the Planning Inspectorate allowed an appeal for conversion into six flats, finding that the pub was no longer financially viable after extensive marketing with no meaningful interest, and that the benefits of restoring and reusing the deteriorating building outweighed the moderate heritage harm. By July 2026, work on the conversion was underway.

== Architecture ==
The building is constructed of grey brick with orange brick used for decorative details, including shaped surrounds to some of the windows and doors. It has a roof of slate with brick chimneys and dormer windows, and the windows are timber‑framed sashes. Parts of the original layout may remain, but the interior has been altered, including the addition of modern toilet areas and a contemporary bar in what seems to have been the former lobby. No original fittings such as seating or bar counters survive, and historic features are limited to five‑panel doors and a few fireplaces, one on the ground floor appearing to have been moved as it is undersized for its current position. The first‑floor function room still exists, but apart from a chimneypiece it is very plain, and the former seven bedrooms have been rearranged.
