= Listed buildings in Wombleton =

Wombleton is a civil parish in the county of North Yorkshire, England. It contains eight listed buildings that are recorded in the National Heritage List for England. All the listed buildings are designated at Grade II, the lowest of the three grades, which is applied to "buildings of national importance and special interest". The parish contains the village of Wombleton and the surrounding countryside. The listed buildings consist of houses, cottages, farmhouses, a public house, a chapel and a village hall.

== Buildings ==
Name and location	Photograph	Date	Notes
Rose Cottage; 54.24768°N 0.97455°W	—	Late 17th century	The cottage has a cruck framed core, and is in limestone with a pantile roof. There are two storeys and two bays, and a brick outshut. In the centre is a doorway and a gabled porch, and the windows are three-light horizontally sliding sashes.
The Plough Inn; 54.24778°N 0.97460°W		Late 17th century	The public house has a cruck framed core, it is encased in rendered stone, and has a pantile roof. There is a single storey and four bays. On the front is a doorway and horizontally sliding sash windows. In the loft are two pairs of crossed apex crucks.
Carter Close; 54.24800°N 0.97469°W		Early 18th century	A row of six houses of differing dates. They are in limestone on a plinth, with quoins, partly rendered outshuts and outbuildings, and pantile roofs with coped gables and kneelers. There are two storeys, each house has one bay, and the central house is larger and taller. The doorways are approached by steps, the left two are paired, and the central house has a divided fanlight. The windows are sashes; the windows other than in the central house are horizontally sliding.
White House Farmhouse; 54.24699°N 0.97480°W		1733	The farmhouse is in whitewashed sandstone, the right gable wall is in brick, and it has a pantile roof. There are two storeys, four bays and an outshut. On the front is a gabled porch, there is one casement window, and the other windows are horizontally sliding sashes. The ground floor windows have heavy milled lintels.
Boon Woods Farmhouse; 54.27369°N 0.99885°W	—	Mid-18th century	The farmhouse is in limestone, and has a pantile roof with coped gables and shaped kneelers. There are two storeys, three bays and an outshut. On the front is a doorway, the windows are horizontally sliding sashes, and all the openings have painted grooved wedge lintels.
Methodist Chapel; 54.24645°N 0.97442°W	—	1819	The chapel is in limestone with quoins and a pantile roof. There is one storey, four bays and a rectangular plan. The doorway has an inscribed and dated lintel. The windows are sashes, and all the openings have heavy milled lintels.
House north of the Post Office; 54.24716°N 0.97445°W	—	Early 19th century	The house is in limestone, with an extension in brick, and a pantile roof with coped gables and shaped kneelers. There are two storeys, two bays, and a rear wing. The central doorway has a rectangular divided fanlight, and the windows are sashes. All the openings have heavy milled lintels.
Village Hall; 54.24713°N 0.97354°W		1844	A school, later the village hall, it is in limestone, with moulded scrolls at the corners, and a slate roof with coped gables. There is one storey and two bays. The doorway to the left has a milled lintel, and the windows are tall with pointed heads and small-pane glazing.
