= Ingleby Arncliffe =

Village and civil parish in North Yorkshire, England

Coordinates: 54°24′07″N 1°18′44″W

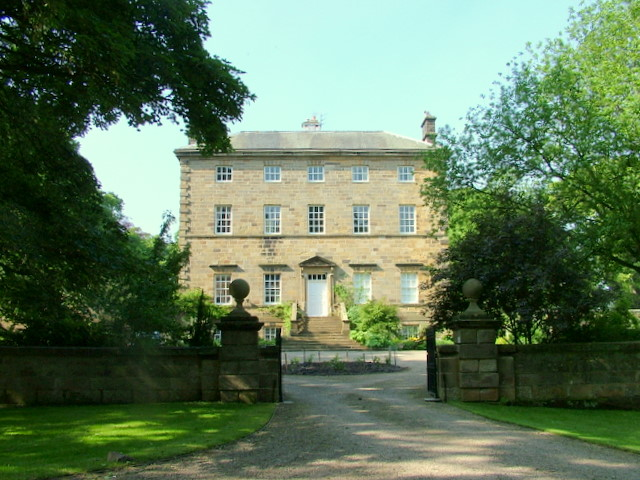
- Arncliffe Hall

- Location within North Yorkshire
- Population: 304 (2011 census)
- OS grid reference: NZ446008
  - London: 214 mi (344 km) south
- Unitary authority: North Yorkshire
- Ceremonial county: North Yorkshire
- Region: Yorkshire and the Humber
- Country: England
- Sovereign state: United Kingdom
- Post town: NORTHALLERTON
- Postcode district: DL6
- Police: North Yorkshire
- Fire: North Yorkshire
- Ambulance: Yorkshire
- UK Parliament: Richmond and Northallerton

Ingleby Arncliffe is a village and civil parish in North Yorkshire, England. It is situated between the A172 and A19 roads, 6.5 miles (10.5 km) north-east from Northallerton and 7 miles (11.3 km) south-east from the small market town of Stokesley, and is on the edge of the North York Moors National Park. The village is conjoined to its smaller neighbour, Ingleby Cross. Ingleby Arncliffe lies in the historic county of the North Riding of Yorkshire. From 1974 to 2023 it was part of the Hambleton District, it is now administered by the unitary North Yorkshire Council.

== History ==
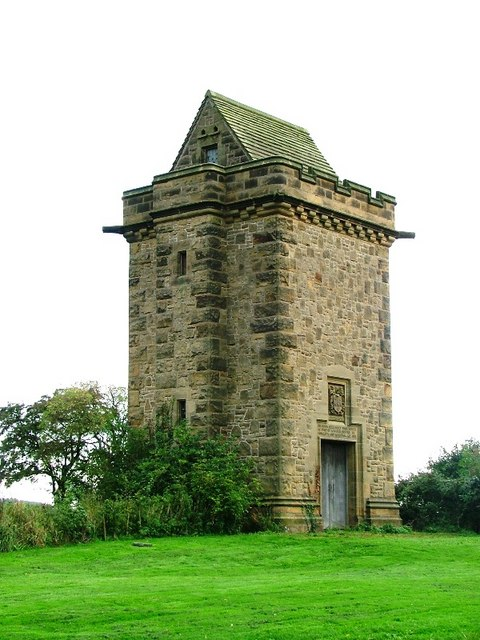
The water tower

According to A Dictionary of British Place Names, Ingleby is derived from the Old Scandinavian "Englar + by", meaning "farmstead or village of the Englishmen", and Arncliffe, Old English "earn + cliff", meaning "eagles' cliff".

All Saints' Church, Ingleby Arncliffe is a Grade II*-listed Anglican church. It dates from 1821 but includes 14th-century effigies. The church is situated less than 0.5 miles (0.8 km) south-east from the centre of the village, and 60 yards (55 m) from the church is Arncliffe Hall, a Grade I listed house from 1753 to 1754, designed by John Carr, that replaced a 16th-century house of the Mauleverer family.

At the centre of the village is the Grade II listed Ingleby Arncliffe Water Tower, built in 1915 to supply water to the village. Also in the parish are the Cleveland Tontine, a historic coaching inn, and The Blue Bell Inn, designed by Walter Brierley.

== Notable people ==
- Rev. David Simpson, Anglican priest was born here in 1745
