= Listed buildings in Colton, North Yorkshire =

Colton is a civil parish in the county of North Yorkshire, England. It contains three listed buildings that are recorded in the National Heritage List for England. All the listed buildings are designated at Grade II, the lowest of the three grades, which is applied to "buildings of national importance and special interest". The parish contains the village of Colton and the surrounding area. All the listed buildings are in the village, and they consist of a house, a pigeoncote in its grounds, and a public house.

== Buildings ==
Name and location	Photograph	Date	Notes
Ye Old Sun Inn; 53.89695°N 1.17413°W		Early 18th century	The public house is in colourwashed brick, with a floor band, a cogged band above, and a pantile roof with the remains of a stone kneeler on the right. There are two storeys and three bays. On the front is a porch, and the windows are sashes, most of them horizontally-sliding.
Colton Lodge; 53.89674°N 1.18192°W	—	Early to mid 18th century	The house is in pinkish-brown brick, with dressings in red brick and stone, floor bands, a dentilled eaves band, and a hipped tile roof. There are three storeys and six irregular bays, the third bay projecting slightly. Most of the windows are sashes in architraves, in the top floor are casements, and all have flat gauged brick arches.
Pigeoncote, Colton Lodge; 53.89635°N 1.18114°W	—	1764	The pigeoncote is in pinkish-brown brick with a stone slate roof. There are two storeys and one bay. In the ground floor is a casement window, and the first floor contains a pitching hole. Inside, there are wooden roosting boxes.
