= Rotary snowplow =

Piece of railroad snow removal equipment

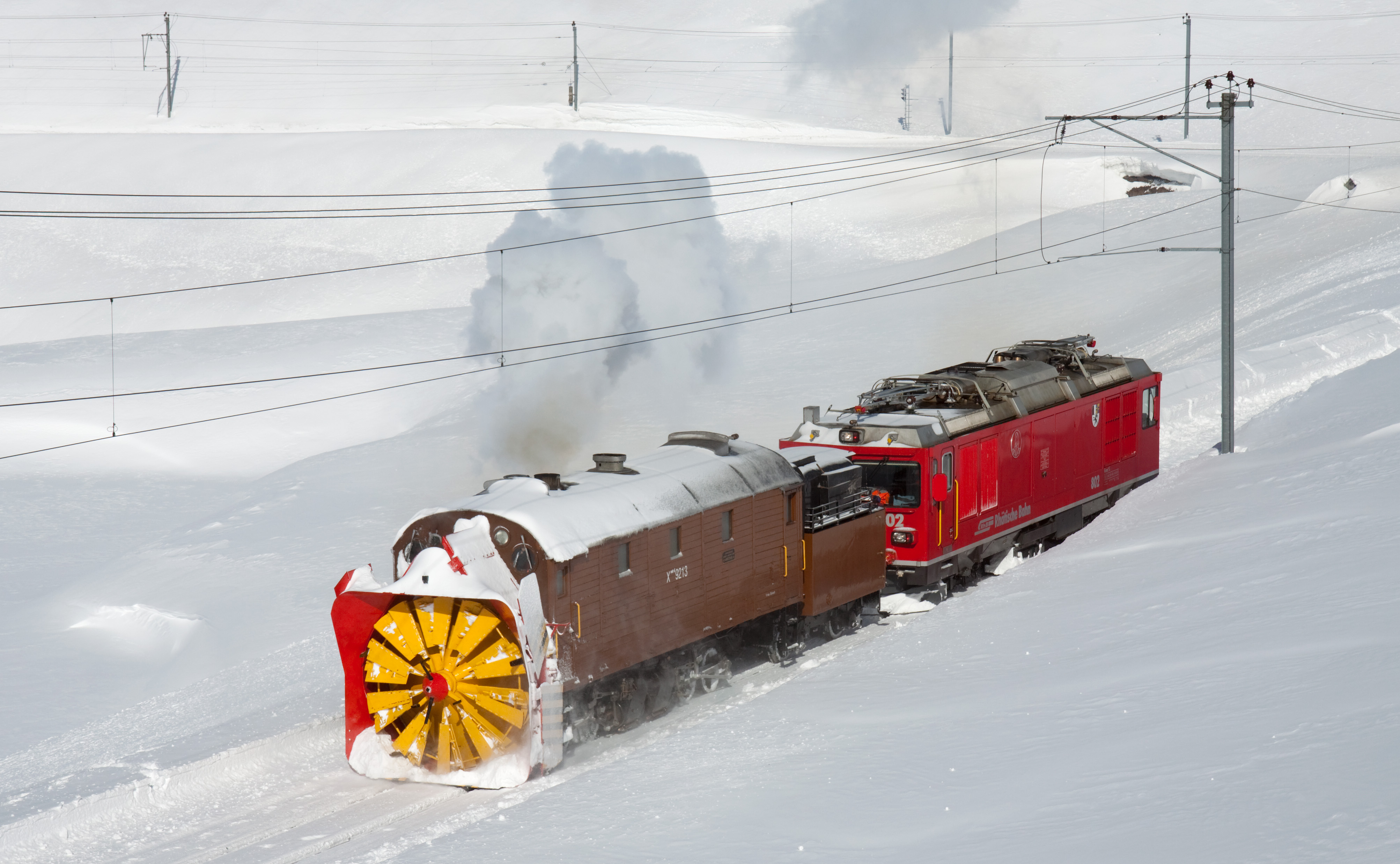
Operational rotary snowplow Xrotd 9213 on the Rhaetian Railway in Switzerland

A rotary snowplow (American English) or rotary snowplough is a piece of railroad snow removal equipment with a large circular set of blades on its front end that rotate to cut through the snow on the track ahead of it. It was developed in the late 19th century for use when snow is too deep to be removed by a wedge snowplow.

== History ==
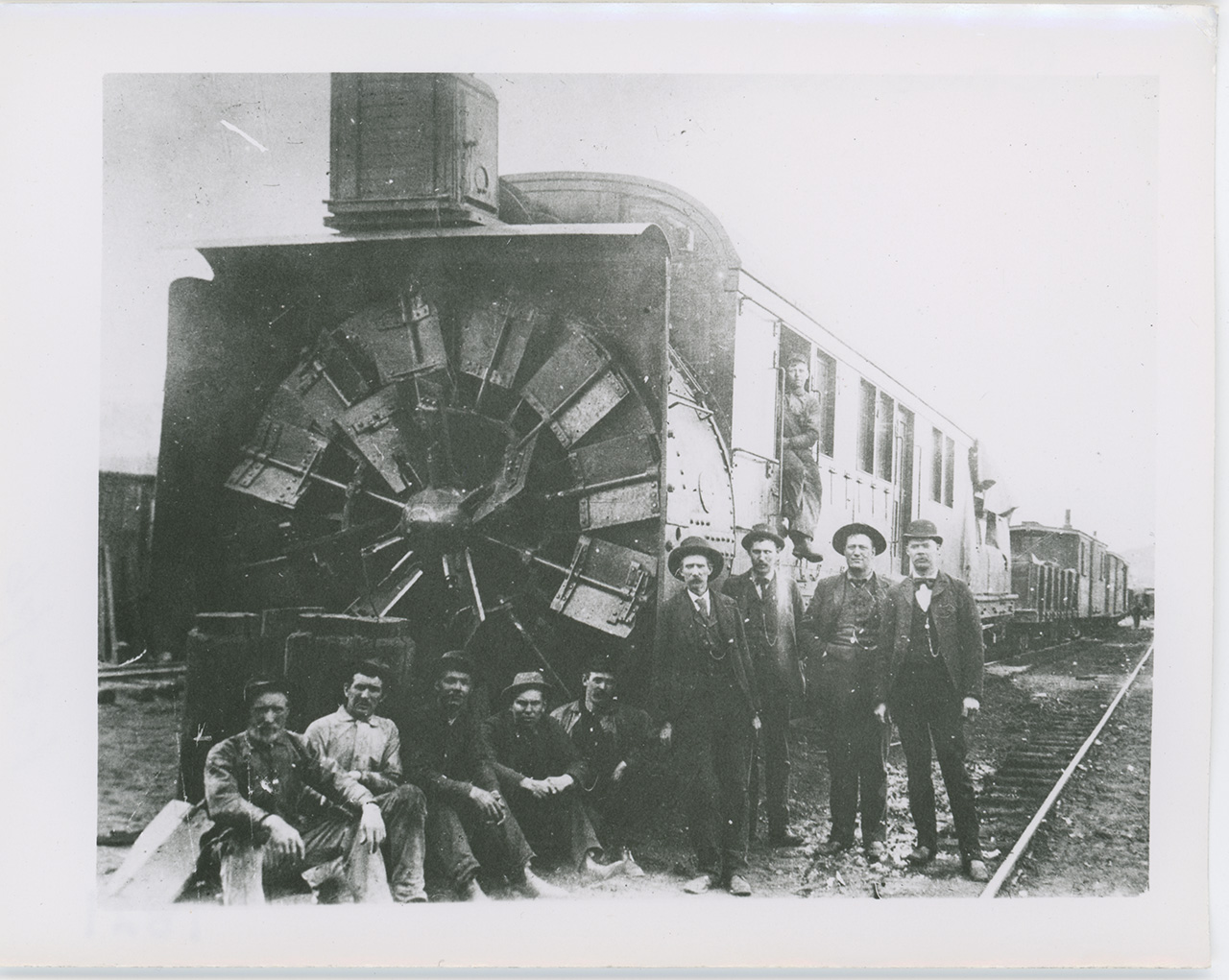
Example of rotary snowplow train

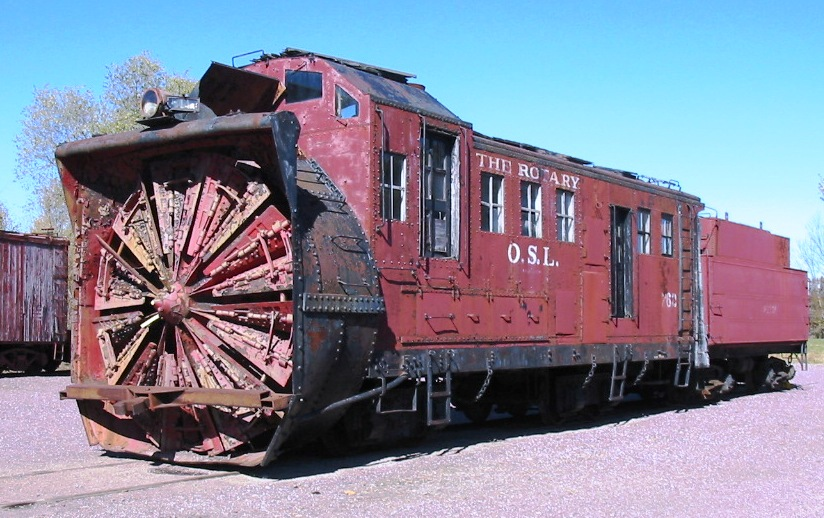
A rotary snowplow from the Oregon Short Line Railroad on display at the Mid-Continent Railway Museum in North Freedom, Wisconsin

The rotary was invented in Toronto, Canada, by dentist J. W. Elliot in 1869. He never built a working model or prototype. Orange Jull of Orangeville, Ontario, expanded on Elliot's design, building working models he tested with sand. During the winter of 1883–1884, Jull contracted with the Leslie Brothers of Toronto to build a full-size prototype that proved successful. Jull later sold his design rights to Leslie Brothers, who formed the Rotary Steam Shovel Manufacturing Company in Paterson, New Jersey. Leslie Brothers contracted with Cooke Locomotive & Machine Works in Paterson to do the actual construction.

Another inventor is said to be Colonel Lewis P. Campbell. He is listed in US patent 1848554, filed in 1929.

== Operation ==
Wedge snowplows were the traditional mechanized method of clearing snow from railway tracks. These pushed snow off the tracks, deflecting it to the side. Deeper drifts cannot easily be cleared by this method; there is simply too much snow to be moved. For this purpose, the rotary snowplow was devised.

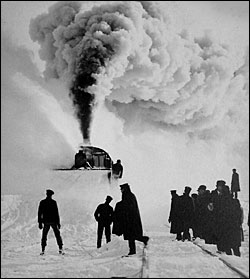
A steam powered rotary snowplow at work in New Ulm, Minnesota

Rotary plows are often deployed when snow is too deep or hard-packed for traditional plows. The ability to operate slowly, as there is no requirement for train momentum to break up the snow, is often an advantage in mountainous regions, where a high speed derailment could be disastrous. Many rotary plows are not self-propelled, so one or more locomotives are coupled behind it to push the plow along the line. An engine within the plow's carbody rotates the large circular assembly at the front of the plow. The blades on this wheel cut through the snow and force it through a channel just behind the disk to an output chute above the blade assembly.

The chute can be adjusted to throw the snow to either the left or the right side of the tracks. An operator sits in a cab above and behind the blade assembly to control the speed of the blades and the direction of output from the chute. With the increasing prevalence of Diesel locomotives, multiple-unit train controls have been added to the cabs, so that the pushing locomotives can be controlled from the plow.

In areas of particularly deep snowfall, such as California's Donner Pass, railroads sometimes created a train consisting of a rotary snowplow at each end, with the blade ends pointing away from each other, and two or three locomotives coupled between them. With a plow on each end, the train was able to return to its starting location even if the snow covered the tracks it had just passed over. Such a train would also be able to clear multiple track mainlines efficiently, as it could make a pass in one direction on one track, then reverse direction and clear the next track. This practice became standard for the Southern Pacific Railroad on Donner Pass following the January 1952 stranding of the City of San Francisco train; during attempts to clear the avalanches that had trapped the train, two rotary plows were trapped by subsequent avalanches, and the crew of a third was killed when their plow was hit by an avalanche.

Rotary snowplows are expensive due to their high maintenance costs, which the railroad incurs regardless of whether they are needed in a given year. As a result, most railroads have eliminated their rotaries, preferring to use a variety of types of fixed-blade plows that have significantly lower maintenance costs, in conjunction with bulldozers, which can be used year-round on maintenance-of-way projects. In addition, because rotaries leave an open-cut in the snowbank that fixed-blade plows cannot push snow past, once rotaries have been used, they must be used for all further significant snowfalls until the snowpack has melted. Since rotaries, which need energy to power the blades, also cost more to operate than fixed-blade plows, they are now generally considered to be a tool of last resort for the railroads that own them.

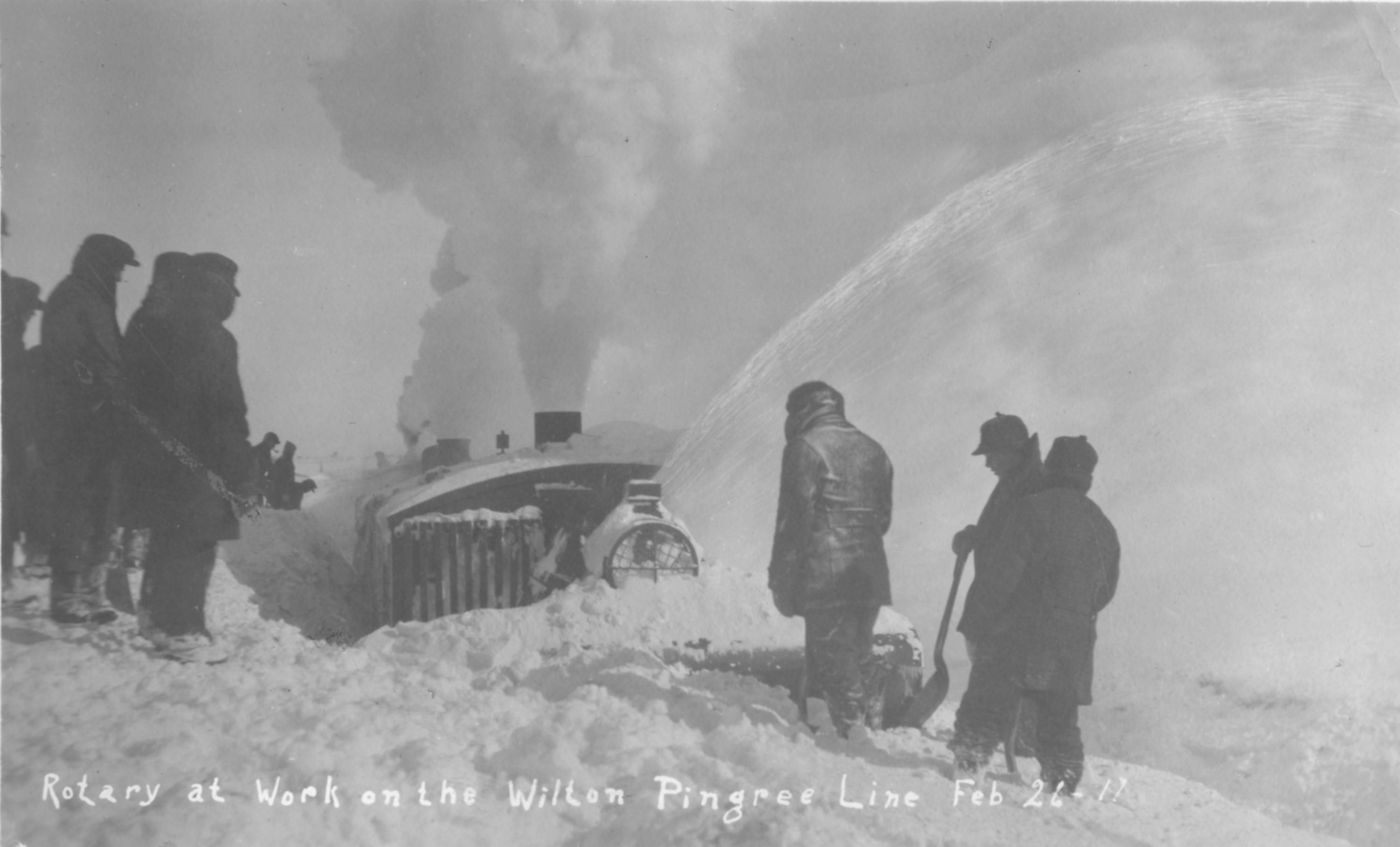
A rotary snowplow at work between Wilton and Pingree in North Dakota in February 1911.

The few remaining rotary plows in North America are either owned by museum railroads or are kept in reserve for areas with poor road access and routine severe snowfall conditions. The largest remaining fleet of rotaries consists of Union Pacific Railroad's six plows reserved for Donner Pass. Japan sees widespread use of rotary snowplows in its many mountain passes.

== Power ==
Early rotaries had steam engines inside their car bodies to power the blades; a few are still in working order, and in particular one on the White Pass and Yukon Route in Alaska performs annual demonstration runs through thick snow for the benefit of photographers and railway enthusiasts. Rotaries of newer construction are either diesel- or electric-powered. Many steam plows were converted to electricity. Some electric plows can take their power from a locomotive, while others are semi-permanently coupled to power units, generally old locomotives with their traction motors removed; these are colloquially called snails. (This is derived from the fact that engineless but motored units that take their power from another locomotive are slugs; thus the opposite, with engine but no motors, is a snail.)

== Hall of Fame induction ==
In 2001, the rotary snowplow was inducted into the North America Railway Hall of Fame. The hall of fame recognizes and establishes an enduring tribute to the people and things that have made significant contribution relating to the railway industry in North America. The rotary snowplow was inducted in the "Technical Innovations" category with "National" significance.

== Preservation ==
- Alaska Railroad #4 is on display at the Potter Section House State Historic Site south of Anchorage, Alaska.
- Colorado & Southern No. 99201 is on display at the Colorado Railroad Museum in Golden, Colorado.
- Denver & Rio Grande Western 3' narrow-gauge rotary snowplows OM and OY are owned by the Cumbres & Toltec Scenic Railroad in Chama, New Mexico. OM was built in 1880 and converted to narrow gauge in 1907, it last ran in 1976 and has been on display since. OY was built in the 1920s and last ran in 1997 where it was then put on display until recently when it was restored in preparation for a February 2020 photography special celebrating the C&TS' 50th anniversary, and is currently in operational condition.
- Long Island Railroad #193 is on display at the Steamtown National Historic Site in Scranton, Pennsylvania.
- Northern Pacific #2, which was built in 1887 by John and Edward Leslie of Orangeville, Ontario, is on display at the Lake Superior Railroad Museum in Duluth, Minnesota.
- Northern Pacific #10 is on display at the Northwest Railway Museum in Snoqualmie, Washington. It was built in November 1907.
- Oregon Short Line #762 is on static display at the Mid-Continent Railway Museum in North Freedom, Wisconsin.
- Paris-Orléans ZR1 is on static display at the Cité du Train in Mulhouse, France. It's displayed with its right side open to show the interior.
- Rotary Snowplow "B" is on display at the Nevada Northern Railway Museum in Ely, Nevada.
- Southern Pacific MW205 is on static display at the California State Railroad Museum in Sacramento, California.
- Southern Pacific MW206 is on static display at the Train Mountain Railroad Museum in Chiloquin, Oregon.
- Southern Pacific MW208 is in operational condition at the Western Pacific Railroad Museum at Portola, California. This rotary was involved in the rescue of the City of San Francisco train in 1952.
- Southern Pacific MW210 is on display at the Truckee Railroad Museum in Truckee, California.
- Southern Pacific MW7221 is on display in Roseville, California.
- Union Pacific #900075 is on display at the Illinois Railway Museum in Union, Illinois.
- Union Pacific #900081 is on display at the National Museum of Transportation in St. Louis, Missouri.
- Union Pacific #907827/ OWR&N #900061 is on display at the Utah State Railroad Museum in Ogden, Utah
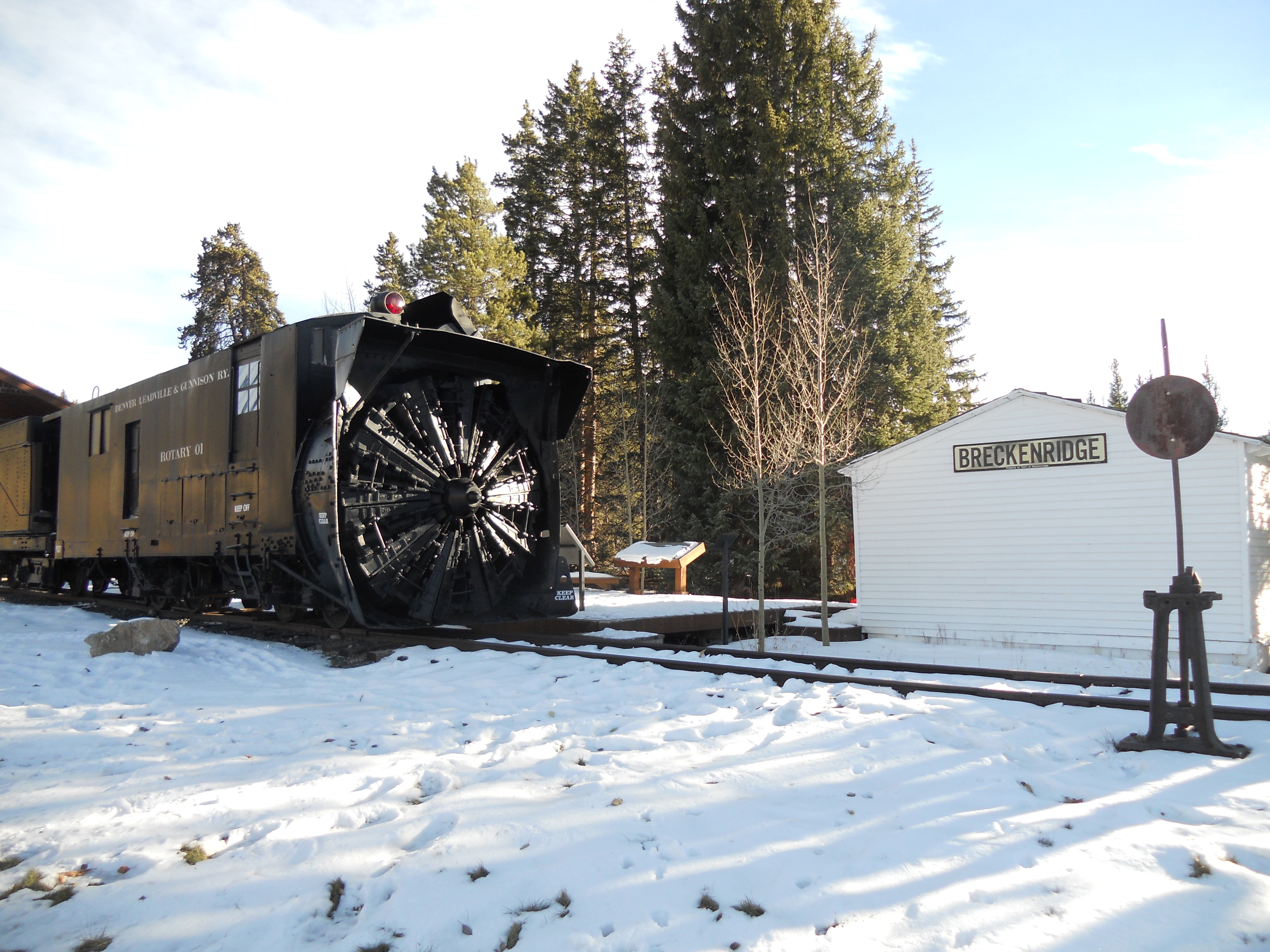
White Pass and Yukon Route rotary snowplow in Breckenridge, Colorado

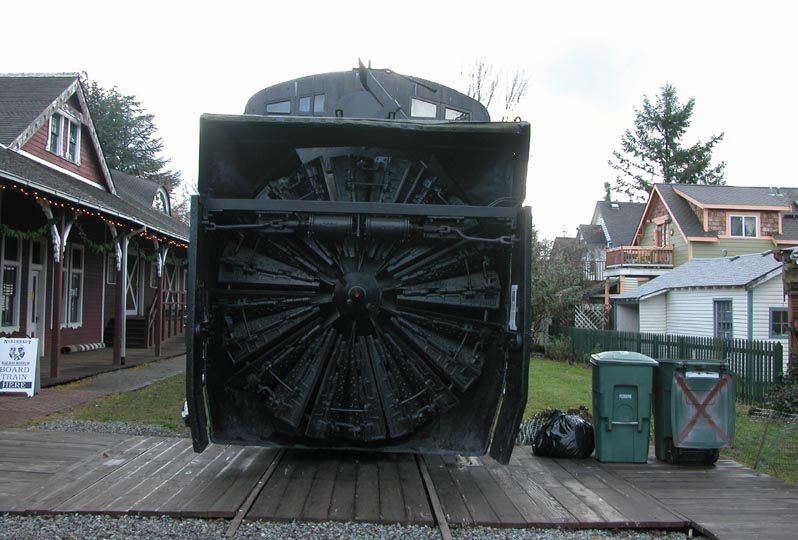
Northern Pacific Rotary 10 steam snowplow from front end

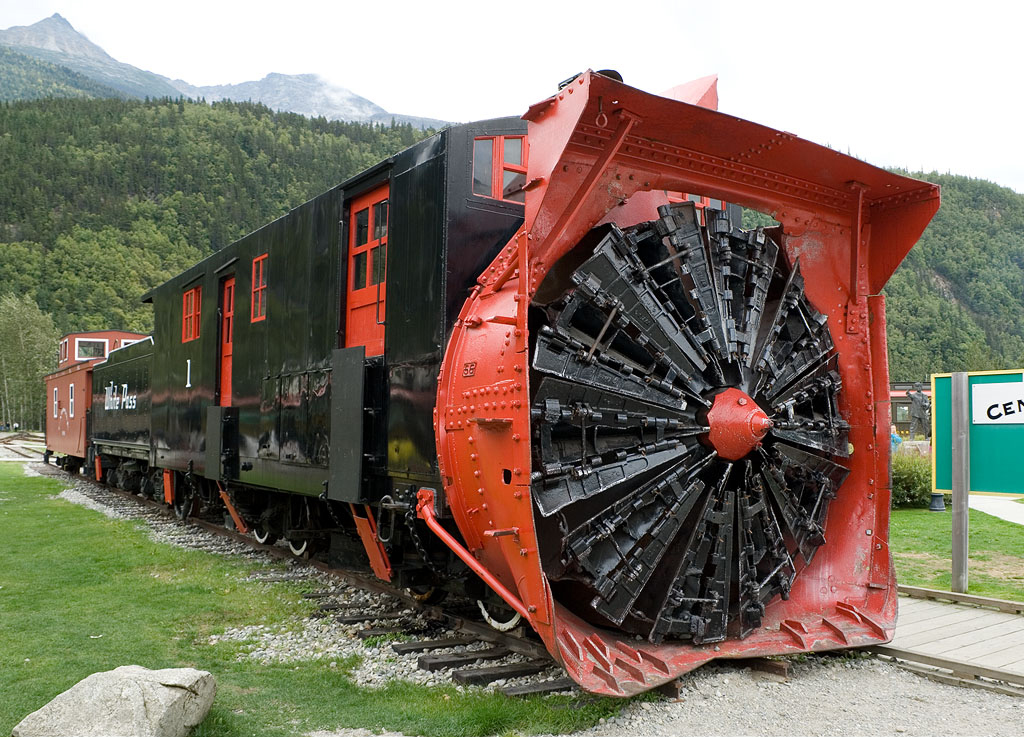
White Pass and Yukon Rotary Snow Plow No.1

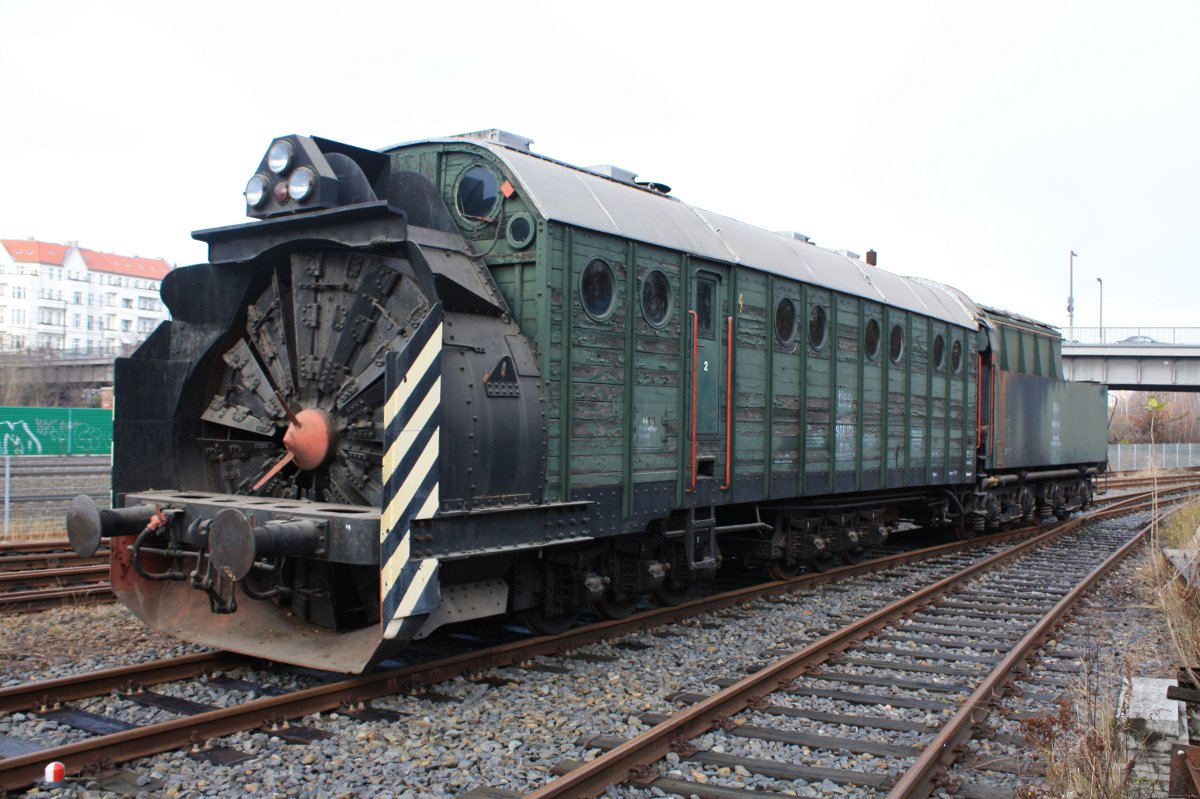
Typical German Henschel rotary steam snowplow (Austrian Federal Railways ÖBB 986.101)

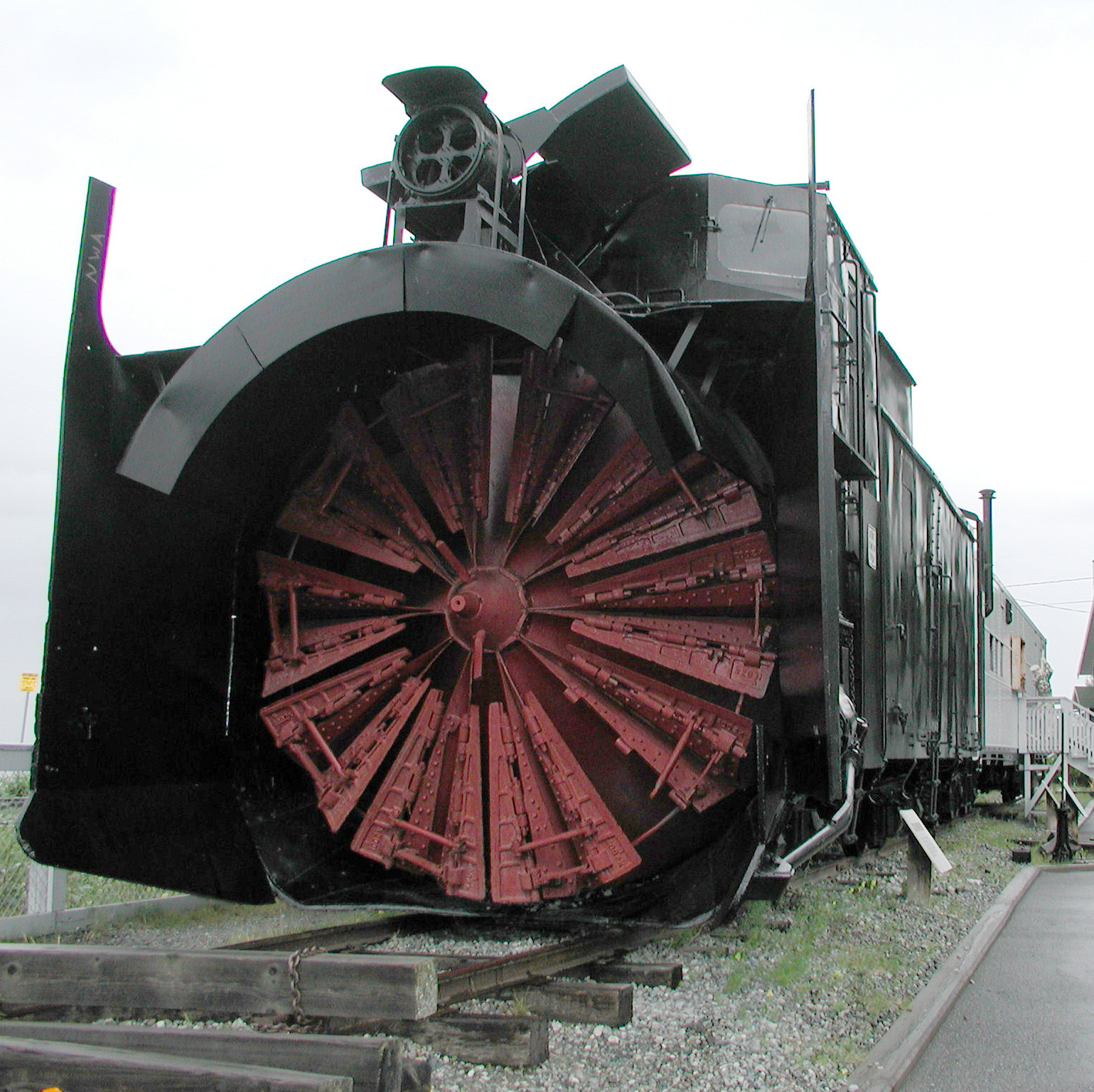
Alaska Railroad rotary snowplow near Anchorage

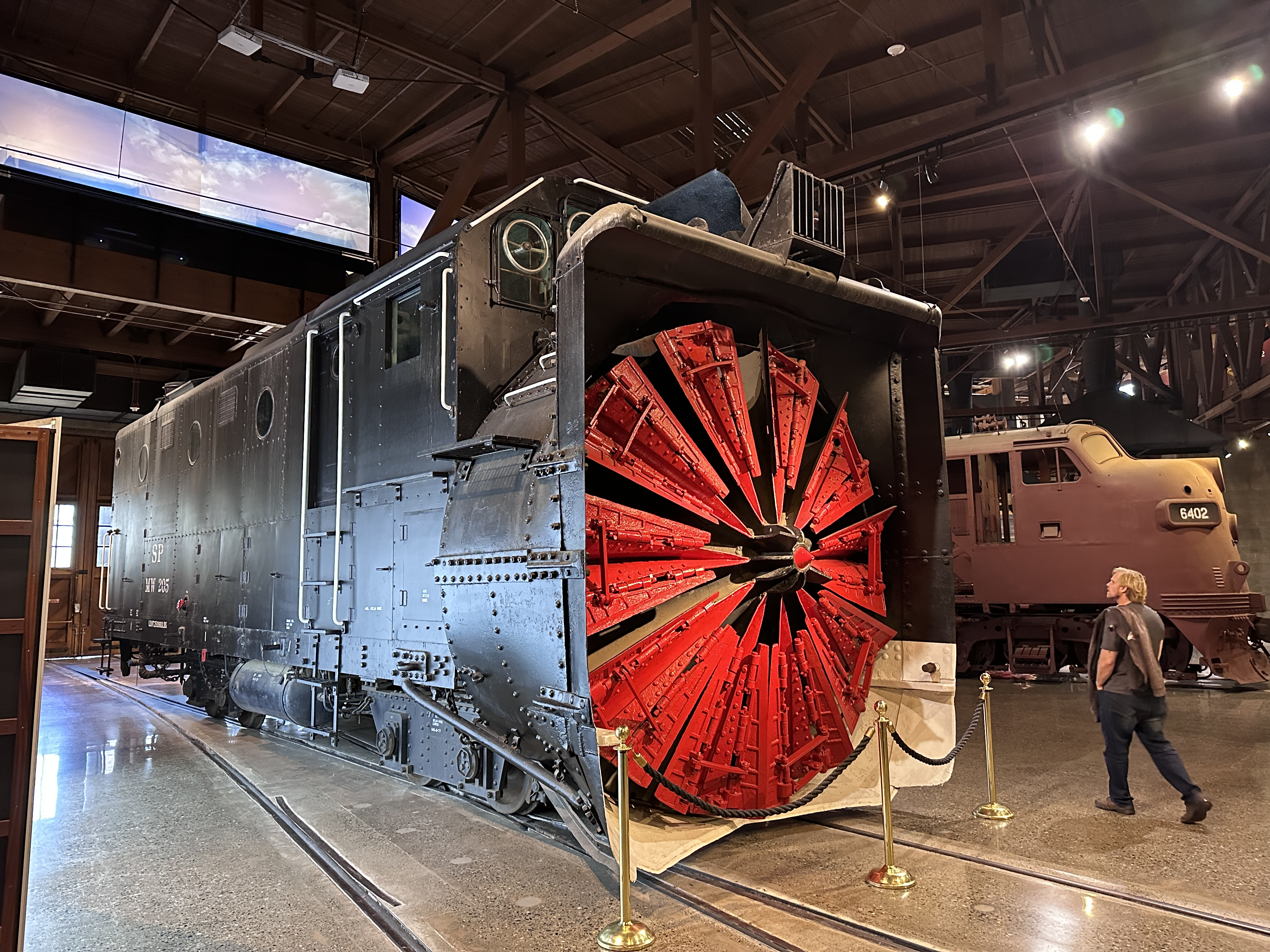
A rotary snowplow on display at the California State Railroad Museum. Note the person standing for scale.

== See also ==
- Plough (disambiguation)
- Snow blower
