= Ingleby Arncliffe Water Tower =

Water tower in Ingleby Arncliffe, North Yorkshire, England

Coordinates: 54.40090°N 1.31438°W

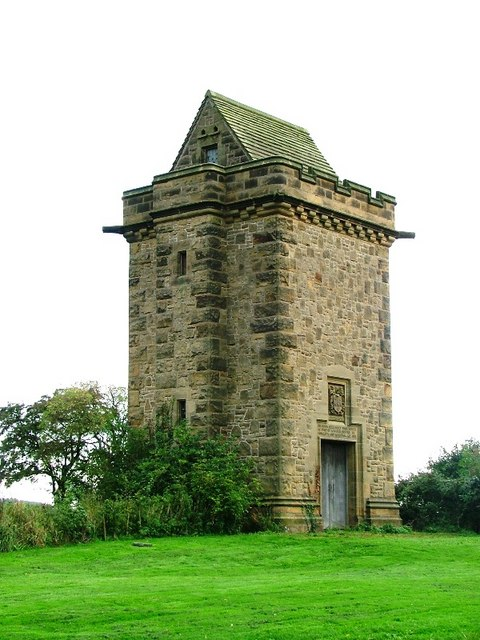
The tower, in 2007

Ingleby Arncliffe Water Tower is a historic structure in Ingleby Arncliffe, a village in North Yorkshire, in England.

The tower was commissioned by Sir Hugh Bell, chair of the Tees Valley Water Board. A local story claims that Bell commissioned it over concerns that the local water supply would be interrupted during World War I. The tower is fed from a spring in the Cleveland Hills, about one mile away, and is stored in the tower, originally able to feed standpipes on demand. It was designed by Walter Brierley, and was completed in 1915. The building was grade II listed in 1990. It now feeds one cottage and some cattle troughs. Inside the base of the tower are stored a fire engine dating from about 1870, and an earlier funeral bier.

The water tower is built of sandstone on a stepped and chamfered plinth, with quoins, a double corbel table, gargoyles, an embattled parapet, and a stone-flagged saddleback roof. There are three storeys, and the tower contains a doorway with a chamfered moulded surround, and an inscribed and dated lintel. Above it is a panel containing an achievement and a motto. The tower is surrounded by a parterre of cobbles.

== See also ==
- Listed buildings in Ingleby Arncliffe
