= The Blue Bell Inn, Ingleby Cross =

Listed pub in North Yorkshire, England

The Blue Bell Inn
- The pub in 2011

General information
- Type: Public house
- Location: Ingleby Cross, North Yorkshire, England
- Coordinates: 54.3988°N 1.3088°W
- Year built: 1912; 114 years ago
- Client: Sir Hugh Bell

Design and construction
- Architects: George Jack (probable) or Walter Brierley
- Designations

Listed Building – Grade II
- Official name: The Blue Bell Inn attached wall and outbuildings
- Designated: 30 October 1990
- Reference no.: 1151373

Website
- thebluebellinninglebycross.co.uk

The Blue Bell Inn is a historic pub in Ingleby Cross, a hamlet in North Yorkshire, in England.

The pub was rebuilt in 1912 for Sir Hugh Bell and has been attributed to George Jack, although other sources attribute the design to Walter Brierley. Its stone was reused from an earlier inn, which was demolished when the road was widened. As originally designed, the pub had a common room, parlour, and accommodation for the pub landlord all on the ground floor, and a hall on the first floor. Attached stables were designed to provide shelter from the north and east winds. The building was Grade II listed in 1990. It lies on the Coast to Coast Walk, and is mentioned in Alfred Wainwright's book, which originated the trail.

The pub has a pantile roof with a stone ridge and an L-shaped plan. The south front has two storeys and five bays, and a slightly projecting single-storey right wing. Most of the windows are horizontally-sliding sashes, some with keystones. On the left is a yard wall with a shed, and the single-storey outbuilding range. Inside, original features include the decorative inner porch door, a simple stone fireplace in the main bar area, and a smaller fireplace in a wooden inglenook frame. The bar is panelled, and there is a staircase in the Carolean style, described by Historic England as "splendid".

== See also ==
- Listed buildings in Ingleby Arncliffe
