= The Plough, Wombleton =

Pub in North Yorkshire, England

The Plough
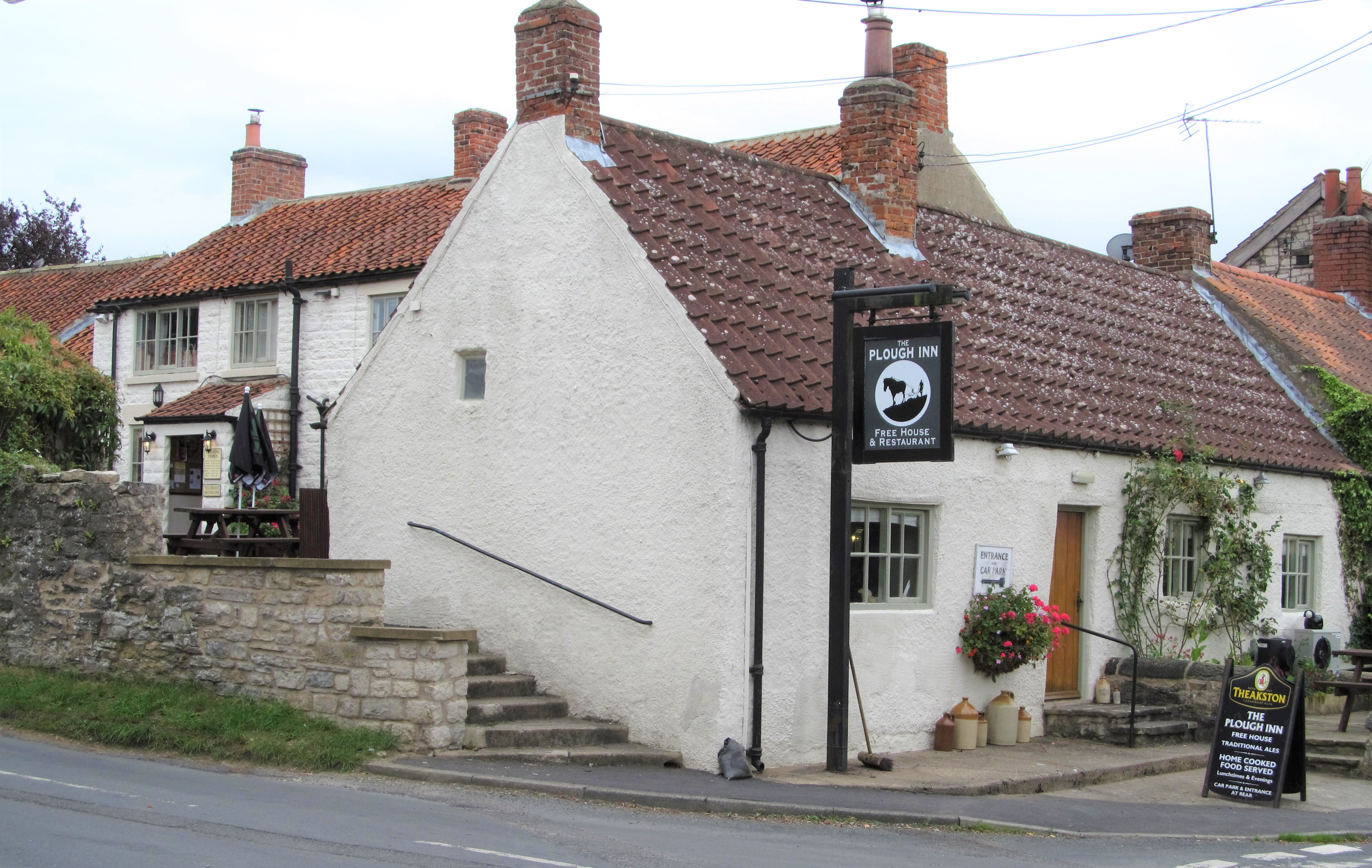
- The pub in 2018

- Location within North Yorkshire

General information
- Location: Main Street, Wombleton, North Yorkshire, England
- Coordinates: 54°14′51″N 0°58′28″W
- Year built: Late 17th century

Website
- ploughwombleton.uk

Listed Building – Grade II
- Official name: The Plough Inn
- Designated: 5 June 1985
- Reference no.: 1174183

The Plough is a historic pub on Main Street in Wombleton, a village in North Yorkshire, England.

The timber-framed building was constructed in the late 17th century and was extended to the rear in the 19th century, although the pub describes itself as 15th century. It was designated a Grade II listed building in 1985. In 2025, the pub was listed among the UK's top 100 gastropubs, included in the Michelin Guide, and named best pub in North Yorkshire at the National Bar & Pub Awards.

The public house has a cruck framed core, it is encased in rendered stone, and has a pantile roof. There is a single storey and four bays. On the front is a doorway and horizontally sliding sash windows. In the loft are two pairs of crossed apex crucks. The central room has its original fireplace, with a corbelled chimneypiece.

== See also ==
- Listed buildings in Wombleton
