= Wombleton =

Village and civil parish in North Yorkshire, England

Coordinates: 54.24779°N 0.97478°W

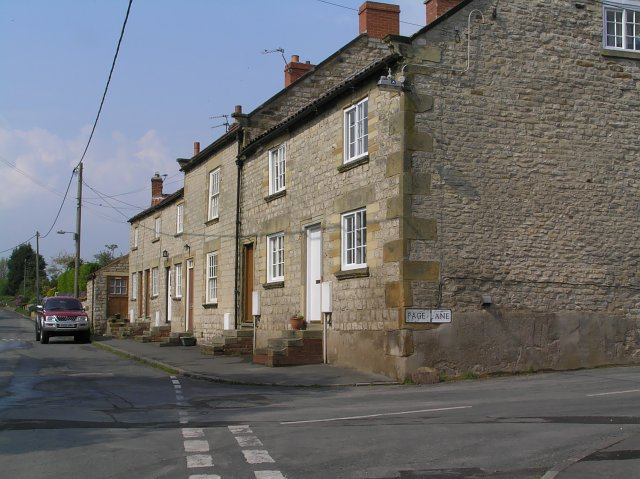
- Houses in Wombleton

- Location within North Yorkshire
- Population: 404 (Including Welburn, Kirkbymoorside. 2011 census)
- OS grid reference: SE669840
- Unitary authority: North Yorkshire
- Ceremonial county: North Yorkshire
- Region: Yorkshire and the Humber
- Country: England
- Sovereign state: United Kingdom
- Post town: YORK
- Postcode district: YO62
- Police: North Yorkshire
- Fire: North Yorkshire
- Ambulance: Yorkshire
- UK Parliament: Thirsk and Malton

Wombleton is a village and civil parish in North Yorkshire, England. It is situated just south from the main Thirsk to Scarborough road (A170) and 7 miles (11 km) to the west of Pickering.

== History ==
The name Wombleton derives from the Old English Wynbaldtūn or Winebaldtūn, meaning 'Wynbald/Winebald's settlement'.

Wombleton is mentioned in the Domesday Book in 1086, and was then held by the Archbishop of York. As late as 1831 Wombleton was still in the liberty of St Peter's, York.

Wombleton was a township in the ancient parish of Kirkdale. It became a separate civil parish in 1866.

From 1974 to 2023 it was part of the district of Ryedale. It is now administered by the unitary North Yorkshire Council.

== Facilities ==
The village has one public house, The Plough, which was renovated in 2012. The pub is situated on the eastern side of the village on the junction with Main Street and Page Lane. Further along Page Lane there is a playing field with a cricket ground, a tennis court and a children's playground.

Wombleton also formed a football team for the start of the 2013–14 season and are currently in the Beckett League Division 1, after becoming the first team to win the 2nd division and 1st division in two consecutive seasons. They joined the York League Division Three in summer 2018.

The village no longer has a chapel, but the Wombleton Parish Hall on Page Lane acts as the focal point for occasional religious services. It also holds regular village and community events.

Approximately 1 mile (1.6 km) to the south of the village on the road to Harome, is the turning for an old RAF base, RAF Wombleton, which is now a private airfield and the location of a popular caravan campsite. Also at the turning on the Harome road is a Second World War Royal Canadian Air Force (RCAF) memorial which was dedicated in 2001.

== See also ==
- Listed buildings in Wombleton
