= Plough (surname) =

Plough is a surname. Notable persons with the surname include:

- Abe Plough (1891–1984), American businessman
- Harold Henry Plough (1892–1985), American biologist
- Timothy Plough (born 1985), American football coach
- Thomas Robert Plough (born 1941), American sociologist
