= Plowshares Project =

Indiana peace studies project

The Plowshares Project is a Peace Studies collaborative between Manchester University, Earlham College and Goshen College in Indiana.

== History ==
The Plowshares Project was formed in 2002, and is funded by a four-year grant from Eli Lilly and Company. The project defines its mission and goals by the religious ethos of the Church of the Brethren, the Society of Friends, and Mennonite Church USA.

== Purpose ==
Plowshares was initiated to enrich the Peace Studies programs at Manchester, Earlham, and Goshen colleges. The program facilitates channels of discussion, and seeks to uphold the peacemaking traditions of the colleges' founding churches.

== Declared goals ==
With the Lilly grant, the Plowshares Program intends to:

- Further Expand Peace Studies Programs—by creating an international resource for peace studies education, strengthening educators, and offering grants for student research.
- Unification of Peace Studies Courses—through discussion and program development by founding schools.
- Increase Awareness of Peace Studies and Related Issues—by creating a community presence to inform respective communities and nation of happenings and to distinguish Indiana as a strong base for peace studies.

== Peace House ==
The Peace House is the main outlet for community involvement for the Plowshares Project. Located in Indianapolis, Indiana, the house serves as a hub for undergraduate students from any US college or university, and in any major, to become directly involved in the fields of peace and justice.

The Peace House provides semester-long residence for students pursuing internships with Indianapolis companies and organizations who are involved or concerned with peace and justice issues. There is also a nine-week summer intensive available for students.

=== Fall and spring semesters ===
During the regular semester, students at the Peace House take two Peace Studies courses taught by adjunct faculty. From the Plowshares website:

- Introduction to Urban Peace and Justice Issues— combined with an introduction to the city of Indianapolis
- Peacemaking in Practice—focusing on "self-reflection, strategic planning and practical skills for non-violent social change"

==== Internship ====
The internship session mediated by Peace House allows for up to 20 hours of work per week under the supervision of the Peace House director; the work grants up to six credit hours.

=== Summer session ===
The nine-week summer session operates without the class work, but still facilitates a full-time internship. The student may work up to 40 hours per week with a selected organization, and may still earn up to six credit hours. During the summer, students may also reside at the Peace House without earning college credit.
