= Colton, North Yorkshire =

Village in North Yorkshire, England

Coordinates: 53°53′47″N 1°10′33″W

Colton
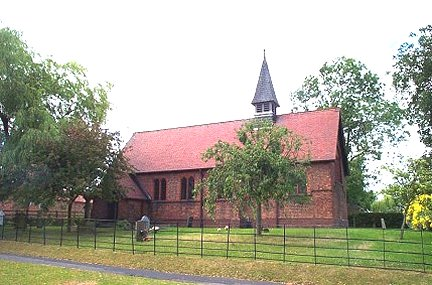
- Colton, North Yorkshire, St Paul's Church

- Location within North Yorkshire
- Population: 212 (2011 census)
- OS grid reference: SE5415244805
- Unitary authority: North Yorkshire
- Ceremonial county: North Yorkshire
- Region: Yorkshire and the Humber
- Country: England
- Sovereign state: United Kingdom
- Post town: TADCASTER
- Postcode district: LS24
- Dialling code: 0113
- Police: North Yorkshire
- Fire: North Yorkshire
- Ambulance: Yorkshire

Colton is a village and civil parish in North Yorkshire, England, seven miles south-west of York. The closest town is Tadcaster. In 2011 the parish had a population of 212.

== History ==
The name Colton derives from either the Old English personal name Cola or the Old Norse personal name Koli, and the Old English tūn meaning 'settlement'.

In 1392, William son of William de Colton was pardoned on grounds of self-defense for killing Robert Mason in Colton.

Until 1974 it was part of the West Riding of Yorkshire. From 1974 to 2023 it was part of the Selby District, it is now administered by the unitary North Yorkshire Council.

== Amenities ==
The village has one pub, Ye Old Sun Inn. There is a wider selection of amenities in neighbouring Copmanthorpe. For amenities such as supermarkets it is necessary to travel to either Tadcaster or York.

St Paul's Church, Colton, lies in the village centre.

== Transport ==
The village is close to the A64 and the East Coast Main Line. Upon completion of High Speed 2 this will join the East Coast Main Line at Colton. Despite being situated on the East Coast Main Line, the closest railway station is Ulleskelf, several miles away.

== See also ==
- Listed buildings in Colton, North Yorkshire
