= Hodge Beck =

Stream in North Yorkshire, England

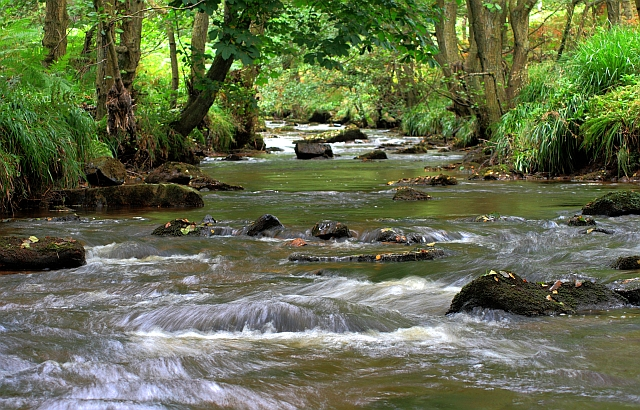
- Hodge Beck in Kirkdale

- Location of the mouth within North Yorkshire

Location
- Country: England
- Counties: North Yorkshire

Physical characteristics
- Mouth
  - location: River Dove
  - coordinates: 54.2384°N 0.9309°W
- Length: 23 km (14 mi)
- Basin size: 58 km^{2} (22 sq mi)
- Discharge
  - location: Cherry Farm
  - average: 0.67 m^{3}/s (24 cu ft/s)

Hodge Beck is a stream that flows through the North York Moors national park in North Yorkshire, England. It is a tributary of the River Dove which it joins near Welburn south of Kirkbymoorside. The beck is 14 miles (23 km) long and has a total catchment area of 58 square kilometres (22 sq mi).

== Course ==
The beck rises on the flanks of Round Hill in the Cleveland Hills of the North York Moors and flows south through Bransdale to reach Cockayne where it is joined by Bloworth Slack. It continues south to meet Ouse Gill, another tributary before it flows through Sleightholme Dale and Kirkdale where it is forded by a minor road. The beck often runs dry at this point as it disappears into the local limestone bedrock in the summer months. Near the Kirkdale ford, is Kirkdale Cave, where the fossilised remains of Pleistocene megafauna were found. On leaving Kirkdale, it is bridged by the A170, and the original A road crossing at Tilehouse Bridge, near Welburn, where it passes Welburn Hall. It continues past Slingsby Aviation airstrip before reaching the River Dove.

== Hydrology ==
The flow of the beck has been measured in its upper and middle reaches since 1936. The upper gauge at Bransdale recorded an average flow of 0.35 cubic metres per second (12 cu ft/s) but was closed in the 1970s. It was replaced by a gauging station at Cherry Farm in Sleightholme Dale, where the record from 1974 shows that the catchment of 37 square kilometres (14 sq mi) to the gauging station yielded an average flow of 0.67 cubic metres per second (24 cu ft/s). The beck has a natural flow regime, unaffected by direct artificial influences. The highest river level recorded at the station occurred on the 19 June 2005, with a height of 2.55 metres (8 ft 4 in) and an estimated flow of 80 cubic metres per second (2,800 cu ft/s).

The catchment upstream of the station has an average annual rainfall of 947 millimetres (37.3 in) and a maximum altitude of 451 metres (1,480 ft) on Round Hill at the beck's source. Land use within the basin is mainly moorland and grassland with some woodland.

=== Farndale reservoir Scheme ===
The dam constructed in 1936 was built by Hull City Council Water Board during the early planning stages of the stillborn Farndale reservoir Scheme. The scheme would have involved a reservoir in Bransdale, covering c. 54 acres, and contained by a dam in Hodge Beck. Water was to be conveyed underground from the Bransdale reservoir to the main reservoir in Farndale and then abstracted to supply Hull.

== See also ==
- List of rivers of England
