= Kirkdale, North Yorkshire =

Valley in England

Coordinates: 54°16′N 0°58′W

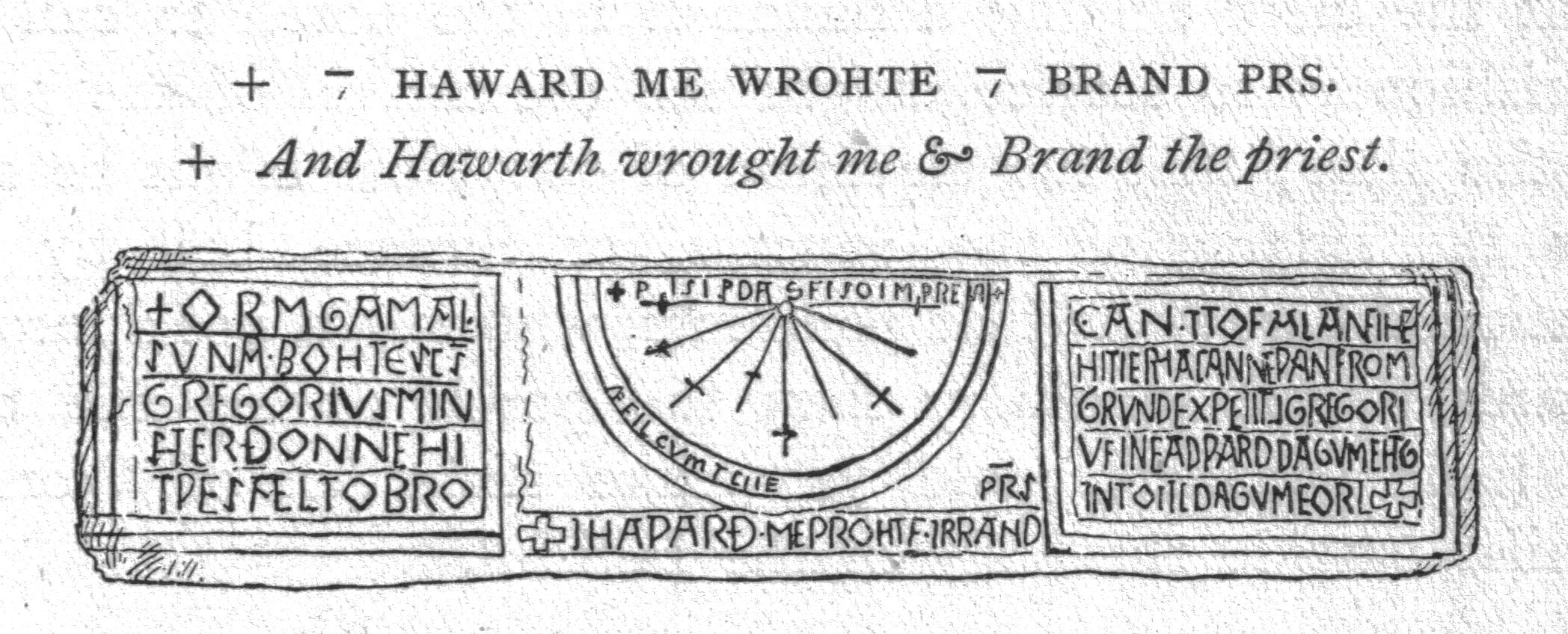
The Tide Sundial at Kirkdale, Yorkshire.

Kirkdale ("church valley") is a valley in North Yorkshire, England, which along with Sleightholmedale makes up the larger Bransdale and carries the Hodge Beck from its moorland source near Cockayne to the River Dove and onto the River Rye in the Vale of Pickering. Corallian Limestone which outcrops on the hills surrounding the Vale of Pickering runs across the region, and this appears as an aquifer in Kirkdale swallowing most of the water from Hodge Beck, which reappears further downstream. During summer months the river bed often runs dry as most of the water takes a subterranean passage.

Kirkdale is noted for a bone cave, an ancient animal den, into which scavengers such as hyenas dragged the remains of many other animals. Numerous bones can still be found in the cave today.

== History ==
Although there is no village in the dale, Kirkdale was the centre of a large ancient parish. The Saxon parish church of St Gregory's Minster stands by the river. It was built in 1055 on the site of an earlier church, and has an 11th-century sundial bearing an Old English inscription. The church gave its name to the dale, first recorded in the Domesday Book of 1086, and derived from the Old Norse kirkja dalr (meaning "church valley").

The parish was composed of the townships of Beadlam, Bransdale, Westside, Muscoates, Nawton, North Holme, Skiplam, Welburn (which included the site of the parish church) and Wombleton. North Holme was transferred to the parish of Great Edstone in the 19th century. All these townships became separate civil parishes in 1866.

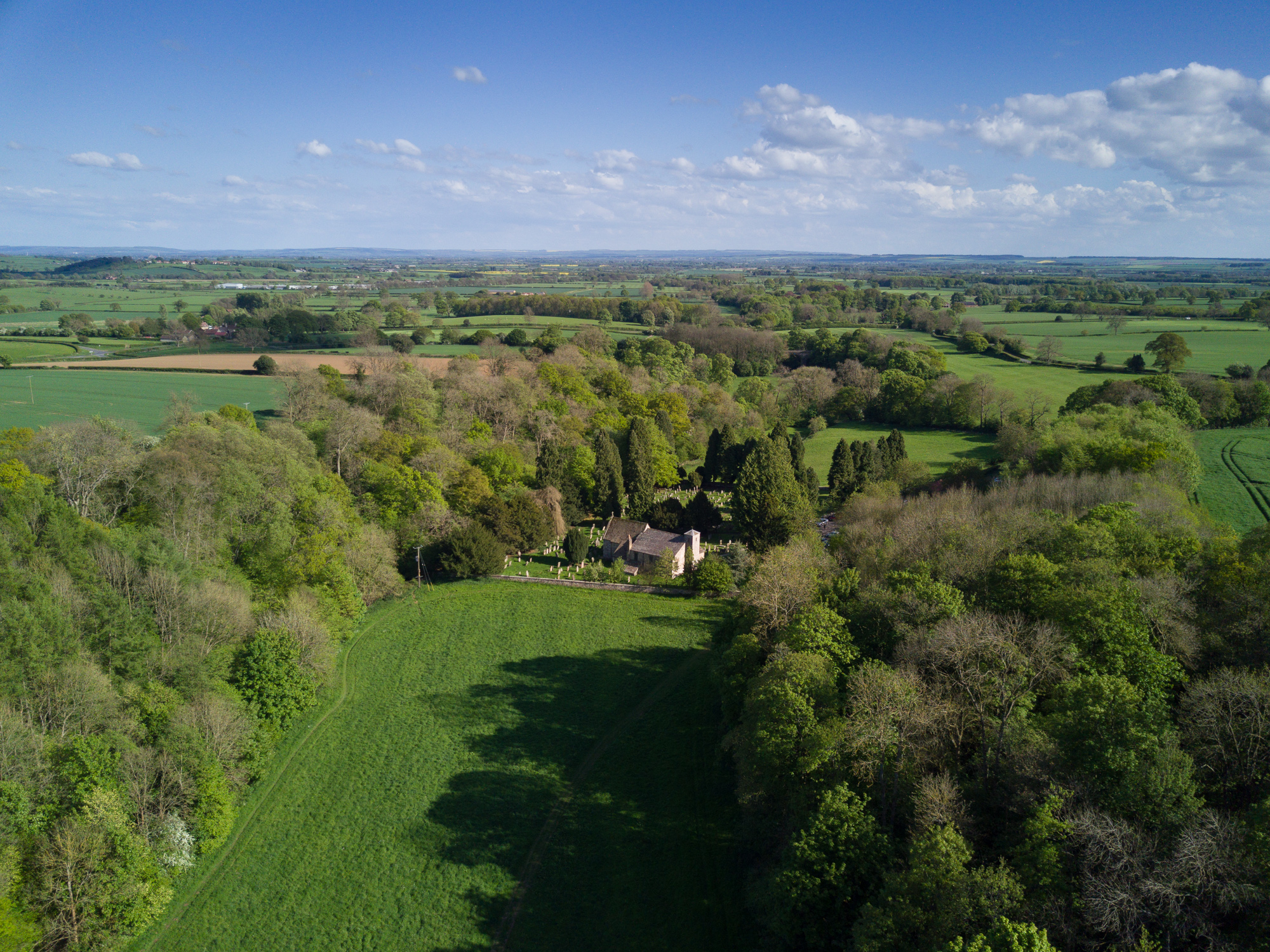
Aerial view of Gregory's Minster in Kirkdale

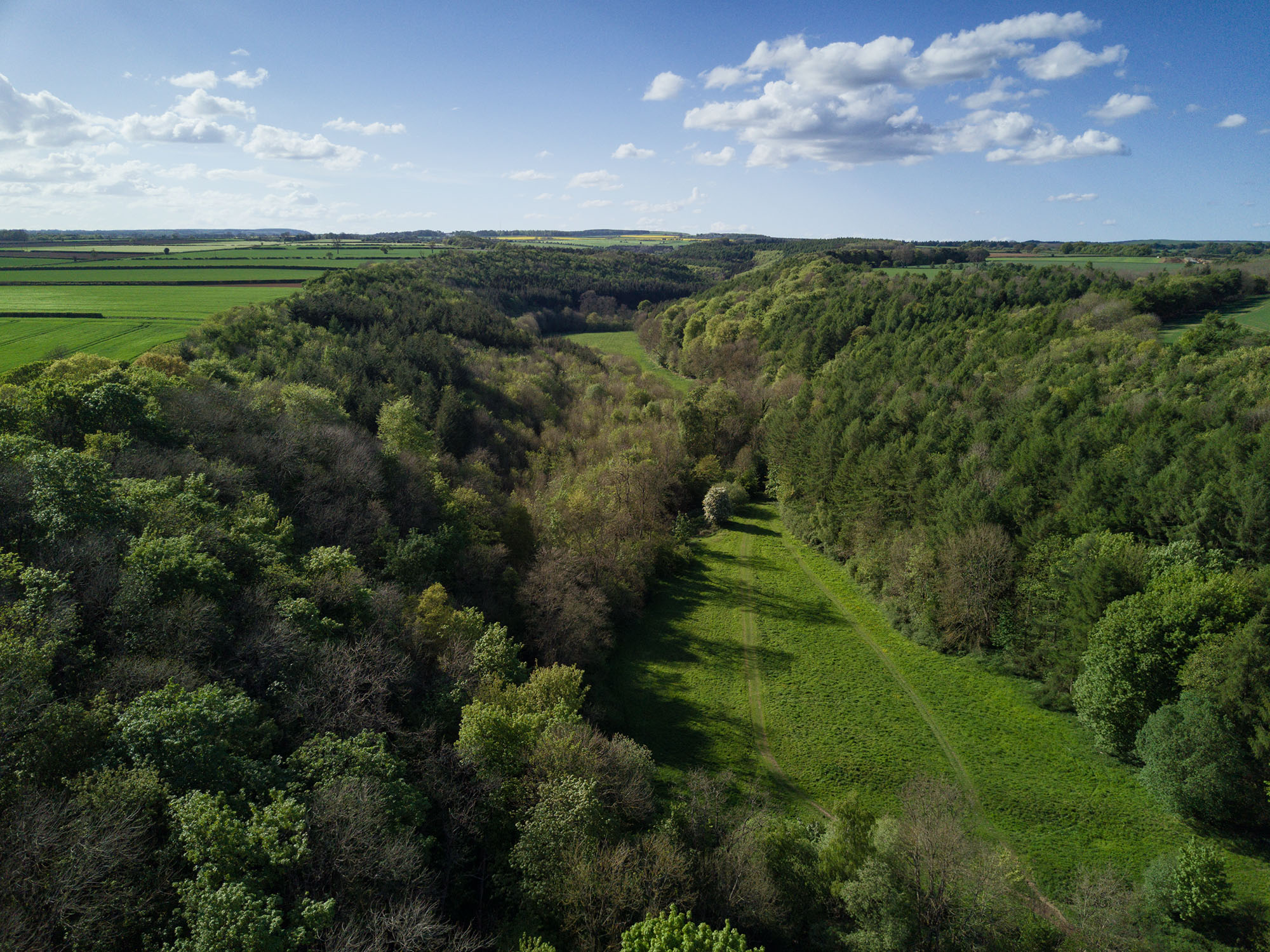
Aerial view of Kirkdale looking north towards Bransdale.

== See also ==
- Kirkdale Cave
- Listed buildings in Welburn, Kirkbymoorside
