= St Michael's Church, Great Edstone =

Church in North Yorkshire, England

Coordinates: 54°14′49″N 0°55′08″W

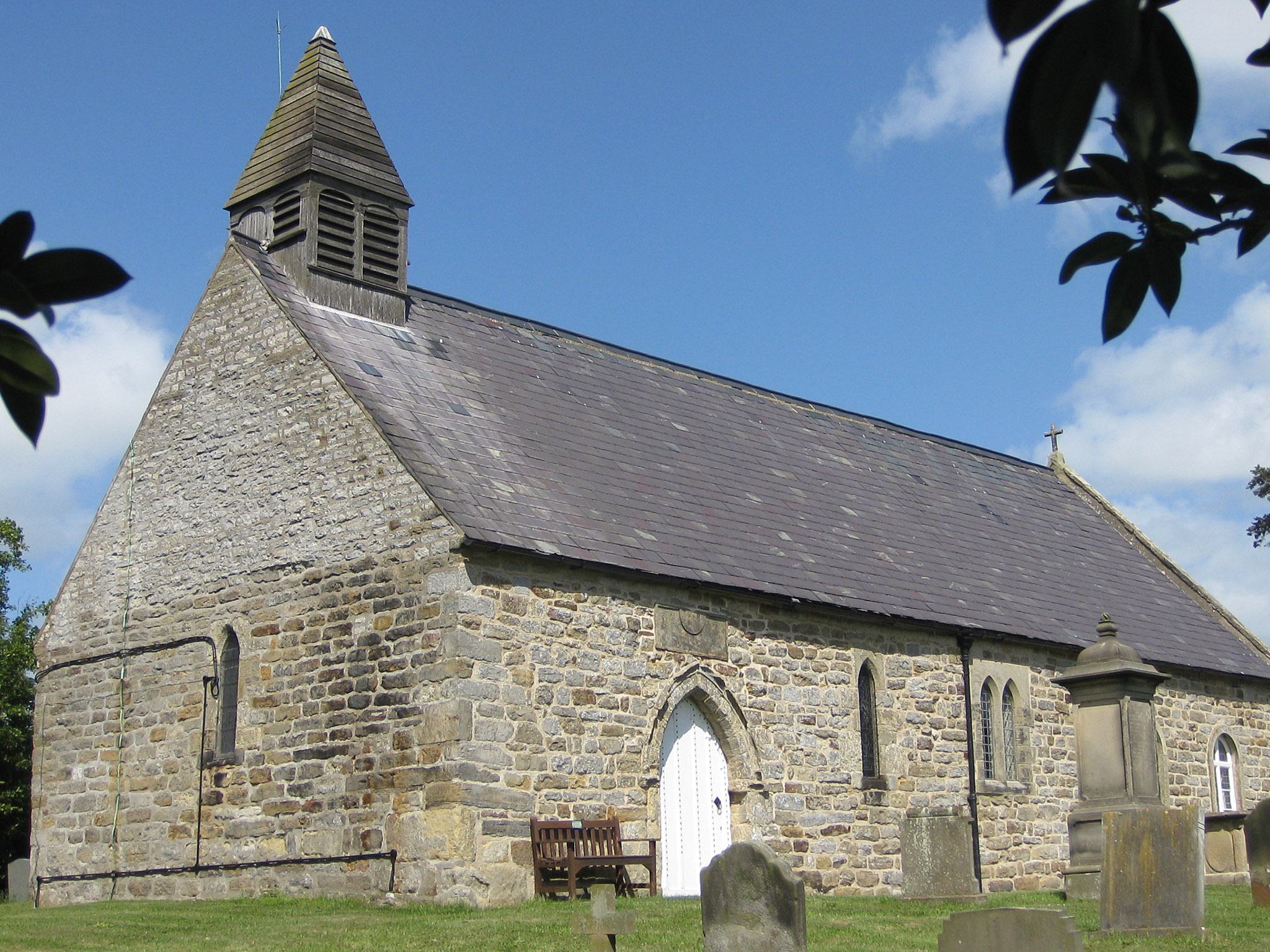
The church, in 2011

St Michael's Church is an Anglican church in Great Edstone, a village in North Yorkshire, in England.

There has been a church on the site since the Saxon period, and the sundial set above the main doorway is from this period. It is inscribed "Orologicum viatorium. Lodan me wrohte a". The oldest part of the current building is the 13th-century nave. The chancel was rebuilt in the 18th century, and there were further alterations when it was restored by C. Hodgson Fowler from 1898 to 1899. The church was grade II* listed in 1955.

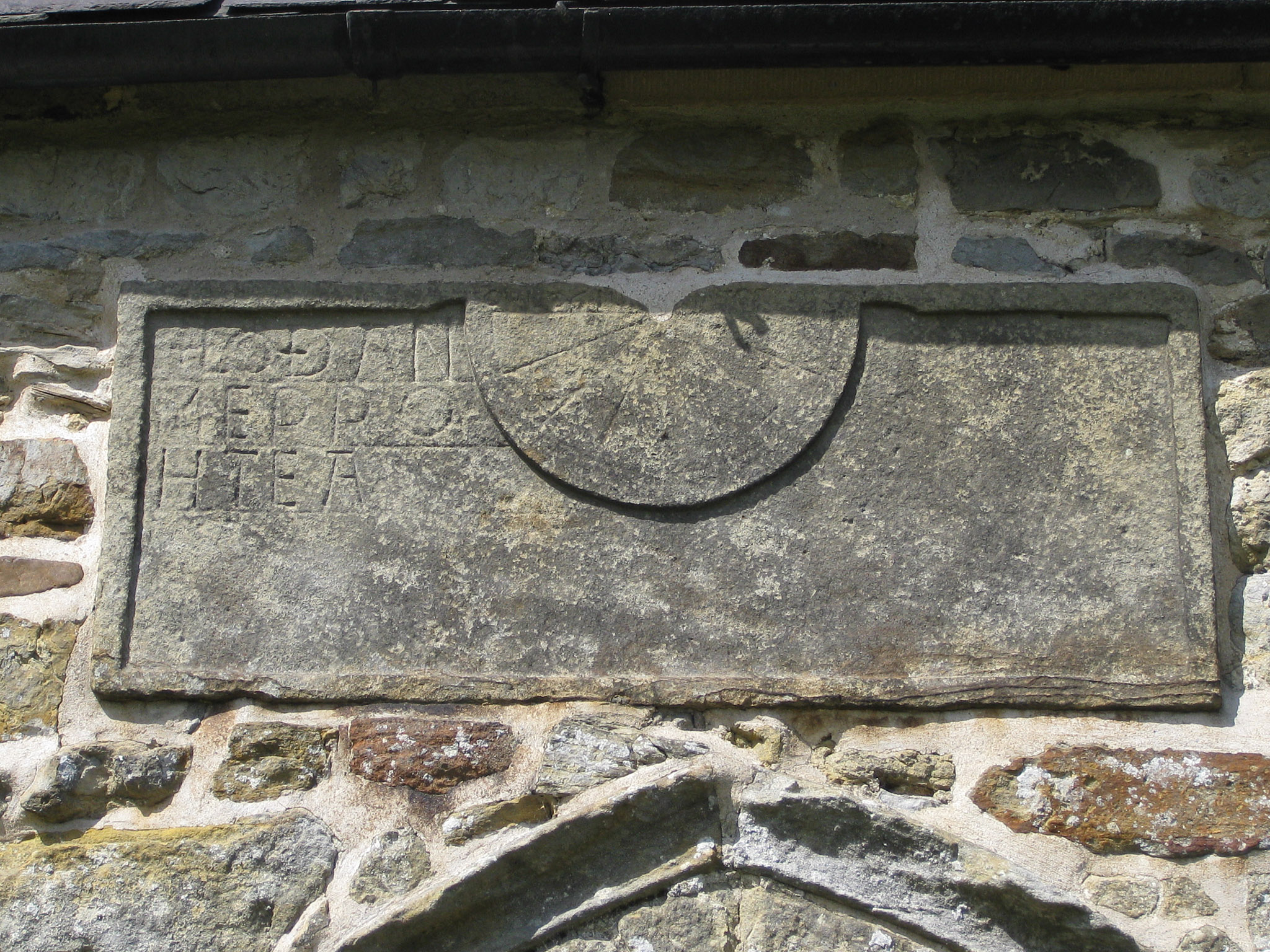
The sundial

The church is built of limestone with a slate roof, and consists of a nave and a chancel in one unit. On the west gable is a square timber bellcote with louvred bell openings and a pyramidal roof. The south doorway has voussoirs and a moulded hood mould springing from imposts, and above it is the sundial. Inside, the bells date from the 14th century, and the altar rail is 16th century. The font is Norman, with a carved base. The west window is a lancet and contains 19th-century stained glass.

== See also ==
- Grade II* listed churches in North Yorkshire (district)
- Kirkdale sundial
- Listed buildings in Edstone
