= Listed buildings in Bransdale =

Bransdale is a civil parish in the county of North Yorkshire, England. It contains 33 listed buildings that are recorded in the National Heritage List for England. All the listed buildings are designated at Grade II, the lowest of the three grades, which is applied to "buildings of national importance and special interest". The parish is sparsely populated, the largest settlement being the hamlet of Cockayne. Most of the listed buildings are houses, cottages and associated structures, farmhouses and farmbuildings. The other listed buildings include a wayside cross, guidestones, boundary stones, a former watermill and associated structures, a church, two bridges, three sundials, and a telephone kiosk.

== Buildings ==
Name and location	Photograph	Date	Notes
Wayside Cross; 54.41254°N 1.05951°W		Medieval	The cross is in gritstone. It consists of a roughly shaped shaft about 1.1 metres (3 ft 7 in) high on a low square base stone.
Guidestone at SE6120295432; 54.35115°N 1.06080°W		1712	The guidestone is in sandstone, and consists of a monolith about 1.14 metres (3 ft 9 in) high. It is inscribed with the date, "IH" "Kirby To Helmsley" and "Stoxly Road"
Bloworth Guidestone; 54.40481°N 1.05251°W		Early 18th century	The guidestone is in gritstone, and consists of a monolith about 1.3 metres (4 ft 3 in) high. On the south face is inscribed "Kirkby moor side" and on the east side is "rode".
Guidestone at SE6405297462; 54.36868°N 1.01564°W		Early 18th century	The guidestone is in gritstone, and consists of a roughly shaped monolith about 1.25 metres (4 ft 1 in) high. On the south face is inscribed "KIRBY RODE".
Elm House; 54.35236°N 1.05059°W	—	Early to mid 18th century	The house is in sandstone, with a stepped eaves course, and a pantile roof with coped gables and shaped kneelers. The house has two storeys and three bays, and a single-storey extension on the left. The windows in the ground floor at the front are casements, in the upper floor they are sashes, and at the rear are horizontally-sliding sashes.
Cowl House and outbuildings 54.36234°N 1.05351°W		1745	The house and outbuildings are in sandstone and have pantile roofs with coped gables and shaped kneelers. The house has two storeys and three bays, with a single-bay extension to the left, beyond which is a barn with one storey and a loft, and to the right is an outbuilding range with one storey and a loft. The house has a doorway with a chamfered quoined surround, a dated and initialled lintel, and the windows are sashes. The ground floor openings have wedge lintels. The barn has a doorway, a pitching hole and slit vents, and inside is an upper cruck truss. In the right range are doorways and a pitching hole.
Ankness Farmhouse and outbuildings 54.33318°N 1.01893°W	—	Mid 18th century	The farmhouse and attached outbuildings are in sandstone, and have pantile roofs with coped gables and shaped kneelers. The house has two storeys and three bays, a coved eaves course, a doorway with a canopy, above which is an initialled and dated lintel, and casement windows. To the left is a turf house with two storeys and no openings on the front, and to the right is a barn with one storey and a loft, containing a doorway.
Boundary stone at SE6102895800; 54.35441°N 1.06404°W	—	18th century	The boundary stone is in sandstone and consists of a rectangular-shaped monolith about 1.6 metres (5 ft 3 in) high. The east face is inscribed "K" and the west side "H".
Boundary stone at SE6117195331; 54.35003°N 1.06065°W	—	18th century (probable)	The boundary stone is in sandstone and consists of a roughly-shaped monolith about 1.2 metres (3 ft 11 in) high. The west face is inscribed "TA".
Boundary stone at SE6136895450; 54.35122°N 1.05715°W	—	18th century (probable)	The boundary stone is in sandstone and consists of a roughly-shaped monolith about 1.6 metres (5 ft 3 in) high. The east and west faces are inscribed "R".
Boundary stone at SE6120795349; 54.35006°N 1.05994°W	—	18th century (probable)	The boundary stone is in sandstone and consists of a roughly-shaped monolith about 1.1 metres (3 ft 7 in) high. The south and north faces are inscribed "R".
Bransdale Mill; 54.37308°N 1.04621°W		18th century	The corn watermill, which has been extended and restored, is in sandstone, and has pantile roofs with coped gables. The main block has two storeys and an attic, and to the left is an extension with a single storey and an attic. In the main block are two round-arched doorways with voussoirs, sash windows, and two small openings in the attic. The lintel of the upper floor window has an inscription. In the extension are a doorway, a sash window and two shuttered openings, and in the gable end is a datestone.
Walls of mill pond north of Bransdale Mill; 54.37326°N 1.04666°W	—	18th century	The walls are in sandstone, and are between 1 metre (3 ft 3 in) and 2 metres (6 ft 7 in) high. They form an irregularly-shaped area, and the pond closes off the mill race.
Outbuildings south of Cowl House; 54.36223°N 1.05361°W	—	Mid 18th century	The outbuildings consist of a smithy, pigsties, a boiler house, a byre, and a loose box with loft above. They are in sandstone, with a stepped eaves course, and a pantile roof with coped gables. The buildings form a T-shaped plan, with a front range of two storeys and two bays, and a single-storey rear range. They contain stable doors with quoined surrounds, and shuttered pitching holes. In the right gable end are steps leading to a loft door incorporating a kennel.
Outbuildings south of Bransdale Mill; 54.37285°N 1.04639°W	—	Late 18th century	The outbuildings consist of a cartshed, a stable and byres with lofts above. They are in sandstone with a pantile roof and a dated and inscribed kneeler. There is a single-storey range of four bays and an extension with one storey and a loft containing doorways and pitching holes. In the left gable wall is a flat cart arch, and in the right gable wall is a datestone.
Waterhouse southwest of Bransdale Mill; 54.37298°N 1.04639°W	—	Late 18th century	The waterhouse is in sandstone and has a pantile roof. There is a single storey with a rectangular plan, and it is built into a hillside. The building contains a doorway in the gable end.
Catherine House; 54.34911°N 1.04824°W	—	Late 18th century	The house is in sandstone with a pantile roof. There are two storeys, two bays, and a later recessed extension on the right. The doorway is in the extension and the windows are casements. Inside, there is an inglenook fireplace and a chamfered bressummer.
Low South House Farmhouse; 54.35682°N 1.05200°W		Late 18th century	The farmhouse is in sandstone, with a stepped eaves course, and a pantile roof with coped gables and kneelers. There are two storeys, two bays, and a rear extension. The door is in the extension, the windows are casements, and all the openings have long wedge lintels.
Millers House; 54.37308°N 1.04607°W		Late 18th century	The house, which was extended to join Bransdale Mill in 1837, is in sandstone with roofs of slate and pantile. The original house has two storeys and two bays, and the extension at right angles to the left has a single bay. The windows are sashes, those in the original house with wedge lintels. At the rear is a gabled porch inscribed with the date and including biblical texts, and there is a door lintel with a date and an inscription.
Outbuilding north of Elm House; 54.35269°N 1.05087°W	—	1780	A range of buildings in sandstone with a stepped eaves course, and a pantile roof with coped gables and kneelers. It consists of a barn at the right end, a loose box to its left, and further to the left is a byre with a loft. There is a single storey and five bays. On the front is a central doorway over which is an inscribed and dated lintel, five stable doors, and a pitching window. On the left gable end is a flight of steps leading to a loft door, with a kennel beneath.
St Nicholas' Church; 54.37771°N 1.04640°W		c. 1800	The church, which was considerably restored in 1866, is built in stone and has a roof of stone flags, with a slate roof on the porch. It consists of a nave and a chancel under a continuous roof, a south porch and a west tower. The tower has a single stage, a louvred bell opening on the south side, a raised parapet band, and coped battlements. The porch is gabled and has a round-arched opening. The windows on the sides contain paired lights with pointed cusped heads, and the east window has a pointed head and three lights.
Moor Houses Farmhouse; 54.34532°N 1.02897°W		1802	The farmhouse is in sandstone, with a coved eaves course, and a pantile roof with coped gables and shaped kneelers. There are two storeys and two bays. The doorway has a fanlight blocked by an initialled datestone, there is one horizontally-sliding sash window, and the other windows are casements.
Outbuildings southeast of Miller's House; 54.37289°N 1.04583°W	—	1818	The outbuildings consist of a smithy and a cartshed added in 1827 in sandstone with a pantile roof. There is a single storey and four bays. On the front is a wide flat arch, to its right is a horizontally-sliding sash window, and to the left is a stable door, both with quoined surrounds. At the left end is an elliptical cart arch with voussoirs on imposts, and in the left gable wall is an owl wall with a surround of voussoirs.
Sundial southwest of Bransdale Mill; 54.37267°N 1.04751°W		1819	The sundial is in sandstone, and consists of a square pedestal about 1 metre (3 ft 3 in) high on three steps, surmounted by a circular dial stone. On the top is a copper gnomon, and there are inscriptions on the four faces of the pedestal.
Barn southwest of Bransdale Mill; 54.37296°N 1.04679°W		Early 19th century	The open barn is in sandstone with a pantile roof and three bays. On the sides are three elliptical arches with shaped voussoirs on square piers, and a raised eaves band. The gable ends contain lifting doors and slit vents.
Bridge over Hodge Beck (north); 54.37638°N 1.05275°W		Early 19th century	The bridge, which carries a road over the stream, is in rusticated sandstone, and consists of a single semicircular arch. It has voussoirs dying into the flanking pilaster buttresses with chamfered imposts, and there are similar buttresses at each end. The buttresses rise to form rectangular piers with flat tops, and the parapet has chamfered shaped coping.
Bridge over Hodge Beck (south); 54.35726°N 1.04859°W		Early 19th century	The bridge, which carries a road over the stream, is in rusticated sandstone, and consists of a single semicircular arch. It has voussoirs dying into the flanking pilaster buttresses, and there are similar buttresses at each end. The buttresses rise to form rectangular piers, and the swept parapet has cambered coping.
Outbuildings north of Cornfield House; 54.36673°N 1.05251°W	—	Early 19th century	The outbuildings consist of loose boxes, stables and a cartshed with loft above. They are in sandstone with quoins, a stepped eaves course, and a pantile roof with coped gables and round-ended kneelers. There are two storeys, a main range with six bays, and a left return with a single storey and two bays. In the main range is a doorway with a segmental arch and voussoirs, rectangular doorways, and loft openings. On the left gable end are steps leading to a loft door.
Sundial southeast of Smout House; 54.36962°N 1.03731°W		Early 19th century	The sundial is in sandstone. It has an octagonal pedestal and base about 1.36 metres (4 ft 6 in) high, on two steps. On the circular top face are inscribed the points of the compass.
Sundial north of the Wesleyan Chapel; 54.36600°N 1.05210°W	—	Early 19th century	The sundial is in stone, and consists of a cylindrical column about 1.1 metres (3 ft 7 in) high. In the upper face is a shallow-cut dial and a copper gnomon.
Cornfield House and cottage 54.36644°N 1.05228°W	—	1827	The house and the cottage, which was added later, are in sandstone, and have pantile roofs with coped gables and shaped kneelers. The house has two storeys and three bays, and contains a doorway with a divided fanlight, and sash windows. Above the door is a raised oval panel with an inscription and the date. The cottage to the right has a single storey and an attic, and two bays. It contains a doorway with divided fanlight, sash windows, and gabled half-dormers.
Bransdale Lodge; 54.37734°N 1.04820°W		Mid to late 19th century	The house is in sandstone, with raised and chamfered quoins, a floor band, a moulded eaves cornice, and a hipped slate roof. There are two storeys and seven bays, the middle bay projecting under a pediment. In the centre is a round-headed doorway with a fanlight, to its right is a canted bay window, and the other windows are sashes with floating cornice lintels.
Telephone kiosk 54.36461°N 1.03683°W		1935	The K6 type telephone kiosk near Spout House was designed by Giles Gilbert Scott. Constructed in cast iron with a square plan and a dome, it has three unperforated crowns in the top panels.
