= Bransdale Mill =

Grade II building in North Yorkshire, England

Coordinates: 54°22′23″N 1°02′47″W

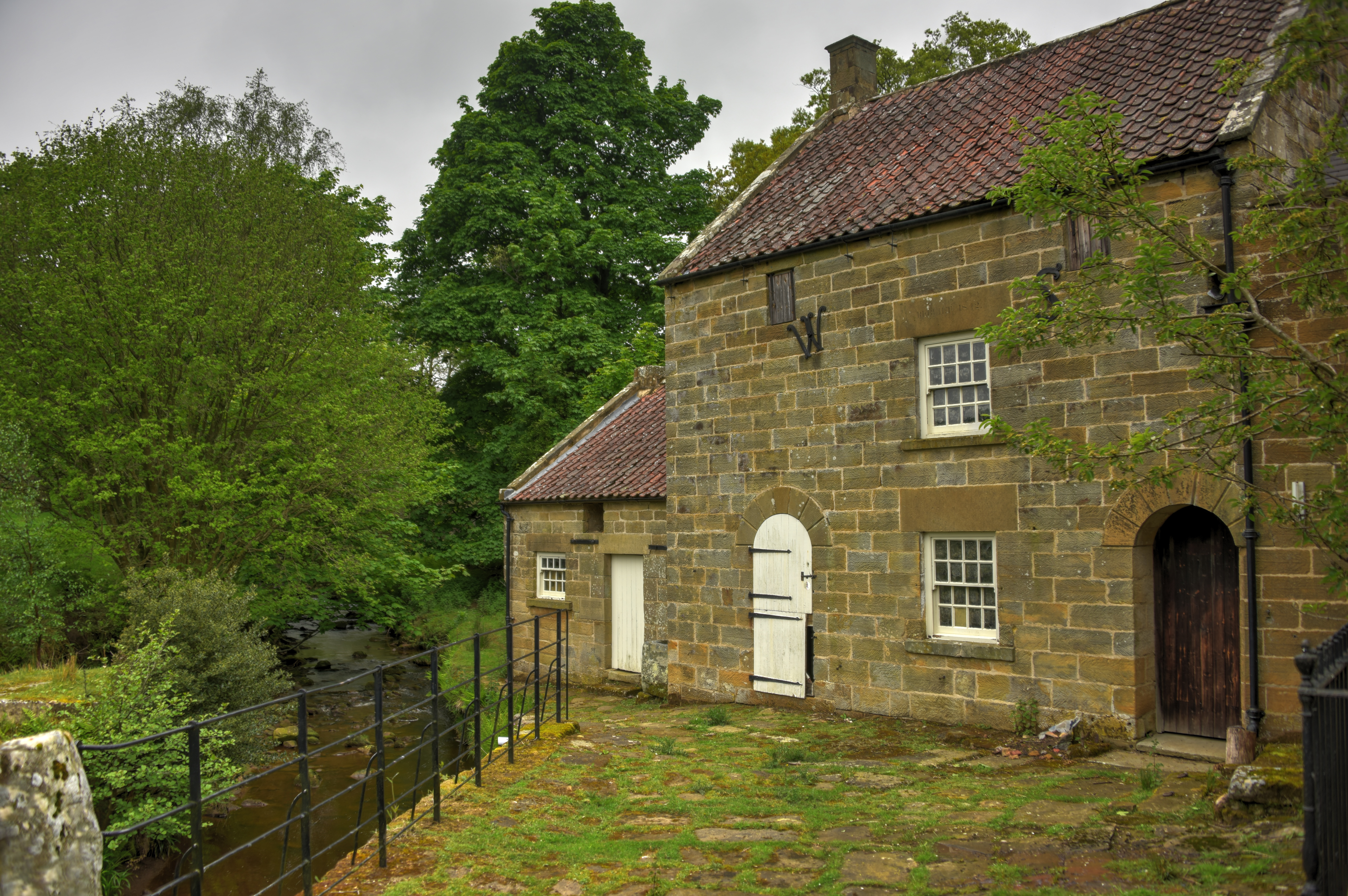
The mill, in 2016

Bransdale Mill is a historic building in Bransdale, a village in North Yorkshire, in England.

There has been a watermill on Hodge Beck since the medieval period. The current mill was constructed in the 18th century, to grind corn. It was extended in 1817, and partly rebuilt in 1842, both by William Strickland. The work included heightening the building to two storeys. In 1917, the mill ceased grinding corn, instead grinding grist. Milling finally ended in 1942, following a major flood. It was Grade II listed in 1987, at which time it was being restored by the National Trust. It has since operated as a bunkhouse.

The mill is built of sandstone, and has pantile roofs with coped gables. The main block has two storeys and an attic, and to the left is an extension with a single storey and an attic. In the main block are two round-arched doorways with voussoirs, sash windows, and two small openings in the attic. The lintel of the upper floor window has an inscription. In the extension are a doorway, a sash window and two shuttered openings, and in the gable end is a datestone. The overshot water wheel with iron buckets survives, as do three sets of millstones. Inside, there is a main shaft and a sack hoist shaft, and a wooden framework of an oat crushing mill.

== See also ==
- Listed buildings in Bransdale
