= Bransdale =

Valley running south through North Yorkshire, England

Coordinates: 54.370°N 1.046°W

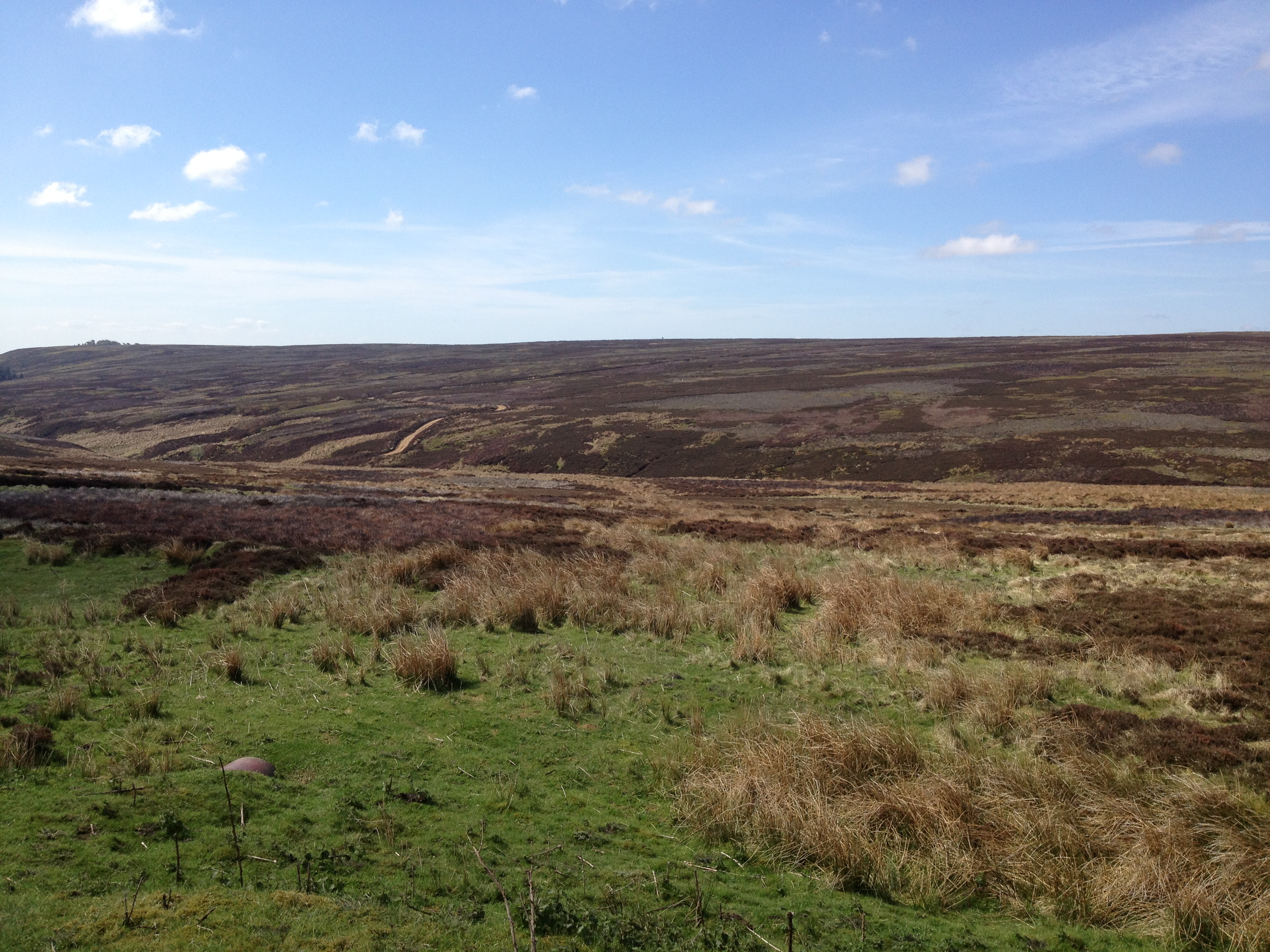
View across the valley

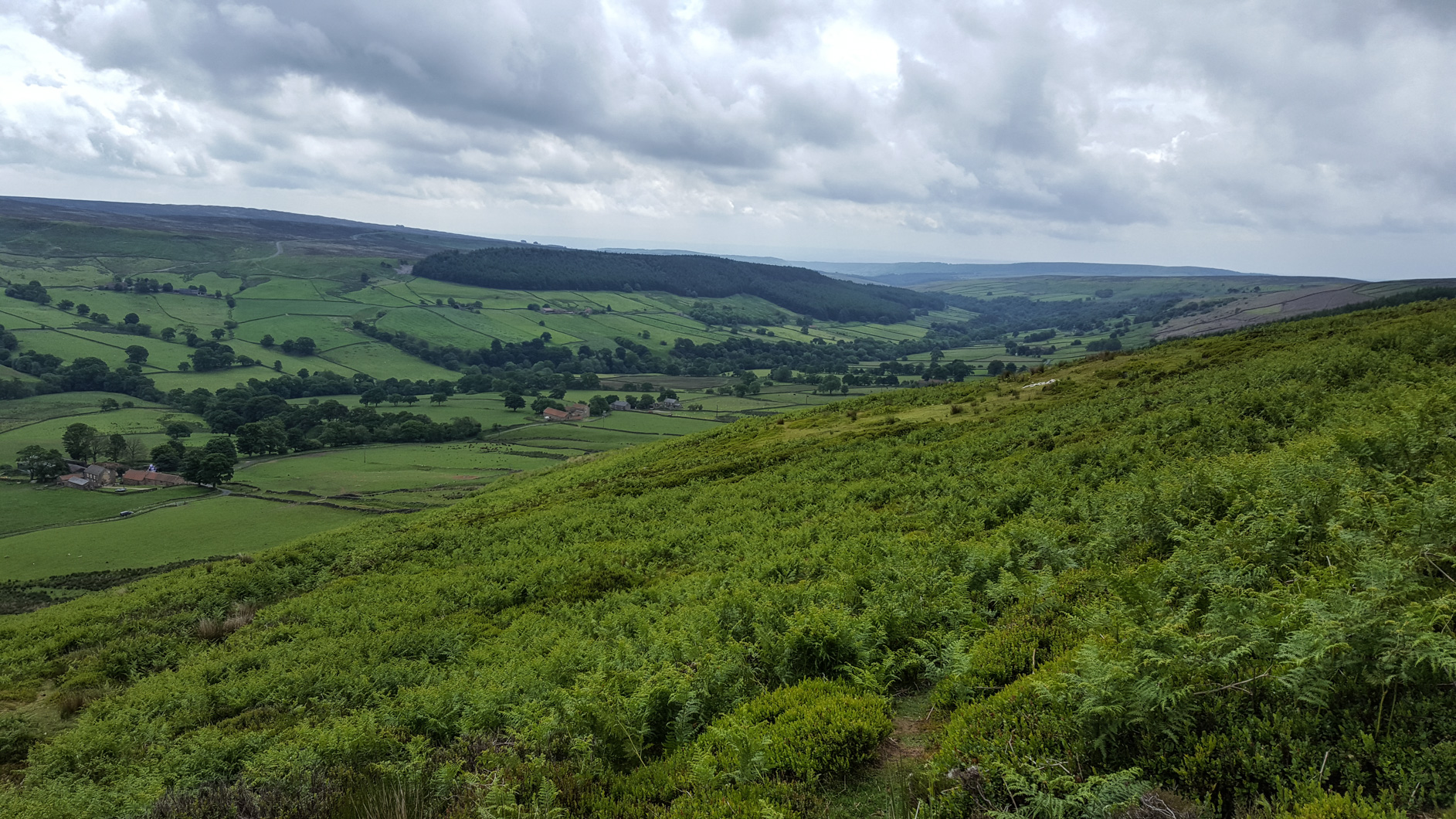
South-west view of Bransdale from Bransdale Ridge

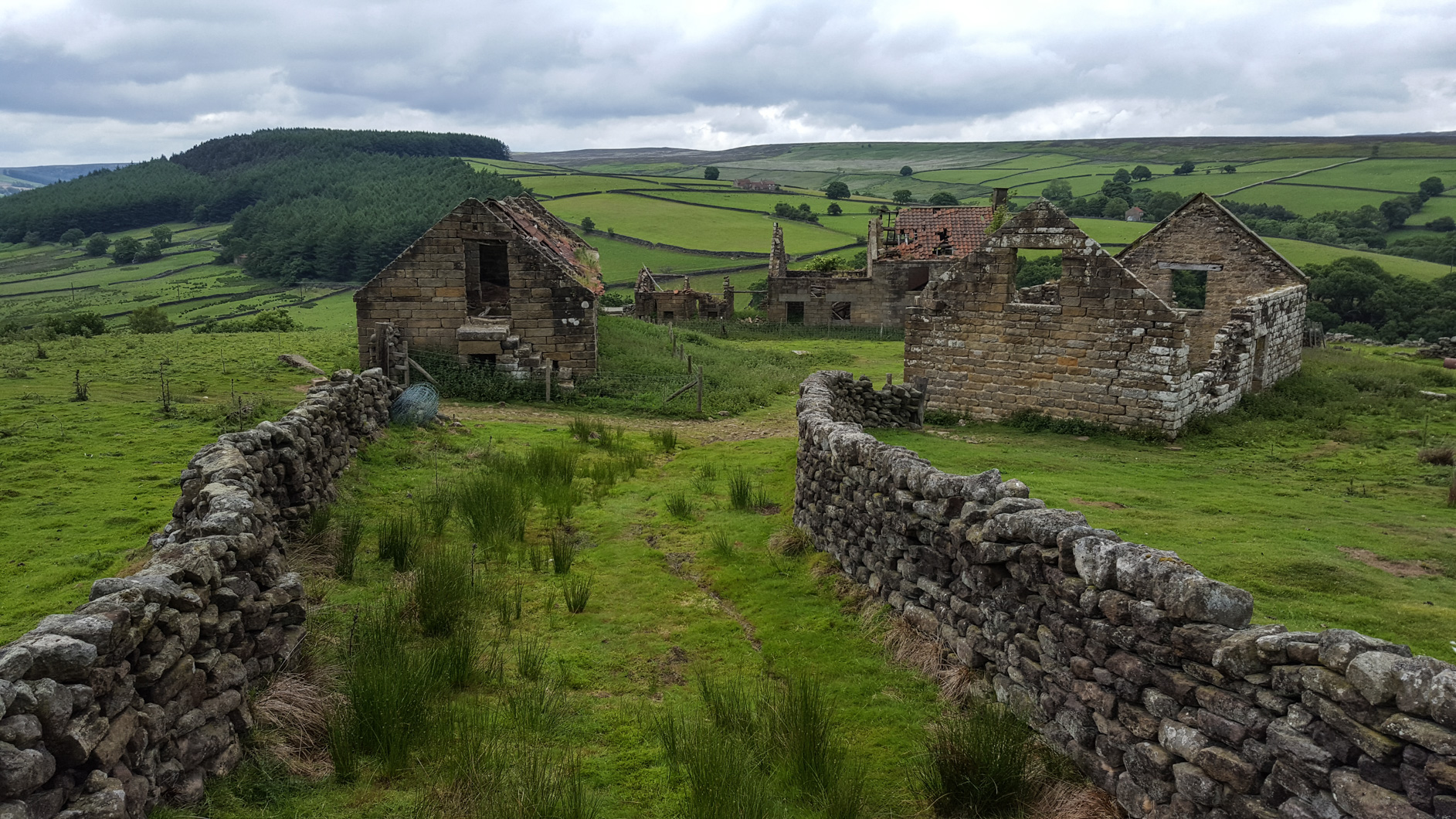
Dilapidated Stork House in Bransdale, a locality where many local walks intersect

Bransdale is a valley running south through North Yorkshire, England, and part of the North York Moors National Park. Sandwiched between Bilsdale to the west and Farndale to the east, it is formed from the dales of Bransdale itself at the top of the valley, Sleightholmedale and Kirkdale. It carries a river called Hodge Beck en route from Cockayne to the River Dove from Farndale three miles (4.8 km) of Kirkbymoorside, which runs on into the Vale of Pickering and the River Rye.

Bransdale is also a civil parish in North Yorkshire, England. It was part of the Ryedale district between 1974 and 2023. It is now administered by North Yorkshire Council.

== History ==
Bransdale was historically divided between two ancient parishes. Bransdale Westside was a township in the parish of Kirkdale. Bransdale Eastside was part of the township of Farndale High Quarter (also known as Farndale Westside) in the parish of Kirkbymoorside. In 1866 Bransdale Westside and Farndale Westside became separate civil parishes. Both civil parishes were abolished in 1934, and the new civil parish of Bransdale was formed from Bransdale Westside, the Bransdale part of Farndale Westside, and a part of the former civil parish of Farndale Low Quarter.

== See also ==
- Listed buildings in Bransdale
- Bransdale Mill
- St Nicholas' Church, Bransdale
- Cockayne, North Yorkshire
- Hodge Beck
