= Edstone =

Civil parish in North Yorkshire, England

Coordinates: 54.242°N 0.911°W

- Location within North Yorkshire
- Population: 217 (Including Salton. 2011 census)
- OS grid reference: SE7096083488
- Unitary authority: North Yorkshire
- Ceremonial county: North Yorkshire
- Region: Yorkshire and the Humber
- Country: England
- Sovereign state: United Kingdom
- Post town: York
- Postcode district: YO62
- Police: North Yorkshire
- Fire: North Yorkshire
- Ambulance: Yorkshire

Edstone is a civil parish in the county of North Yorkshire, England, the principal settlement of which is the village of Great Edstone. Edstone has a population of 217 according to the 2011 census.

It was part of the Ryedale District between 1974 and 2023. It is now administered by North Yorkshire Council.

== Places of interest ==
The North York Moors national park is located two miles (three kilometres) north of Edstone. The nearest schools are: Welburn Hall School (1 1/2 mi or 2.5 km), Kirkbymoorside Community Primary School (1 1/2 mi or 2.5 km) and Ryedale School (3 mi or 5 km).

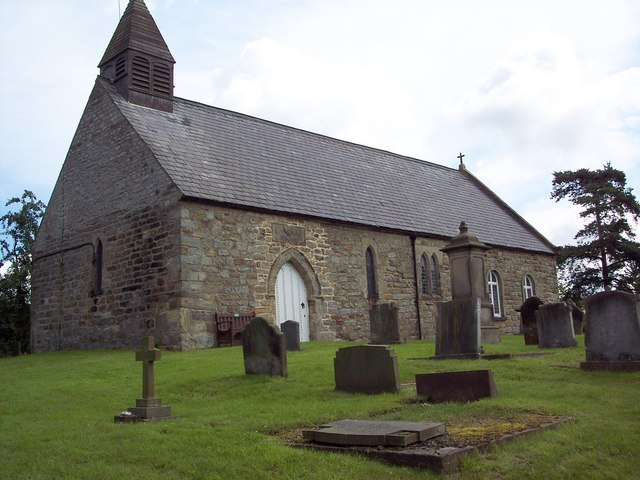
St Michael's and All Angels Church, Great Edstone

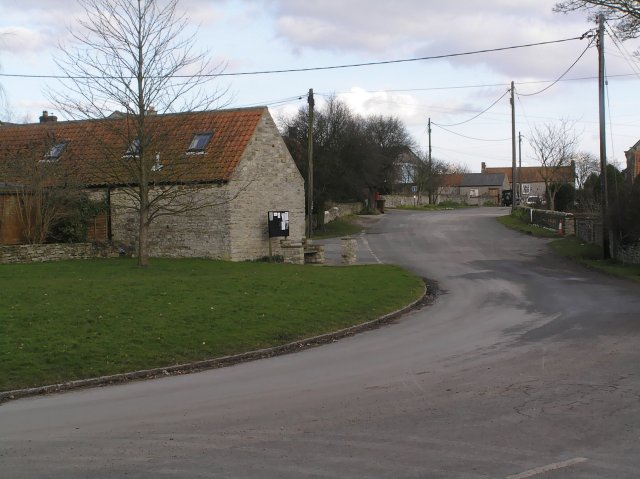
Great Edstone

== Beginning ==
The hill upon which Great Edstone was built was formed by glaciers in about 30,000 BC. While the Ice Age melted, the hill was left to be an island in the middle of a lake which covered the Vale of Pickering – which itself receded once all trace of the Ice Age left. When the ice did melt, the fertile soils of the land are likely to have encouraged farming.

== History ==
The name 'Edstone' has an original meaning when broken down into old English which is: "Eadin's farm/settlement."

In 1870–72, John Marius Wilson's Imperial Gazetteer of England and Wales described Edstone as

EDSTONE (Great), a township and a parish in Helmsley district, N. R. Yorkshire. The township lies on the river Dove, 2 1/2 miles [4 km] SSE of Kirkbymoorside, and 6 W by S of Pickering r. station. . Acres, 1, 190. Real property, £2, 123. Pop., 135. Houses, 27. The parish contains also the township of North Holme; and its post town is Kirkbymoorside, under York. Acres, 1,800."

Great Edstone was a key place for evacuees to stay during the Second World War, as can be seen in the still-remaining village hall. In the 1970s–80s the school was removed, since there were not enough children in the village. Since then, the village has decreased in size, and presently all that remains is about 30–50 houses, a church, a village hall, a post box and a telephone box. However the village continues to grow in population as new houses are built, and it has recently seen an increase in the number of young families.

The major residential street of Great Edstone is the Wapping, upon which many of the houses are built. Throughout the area, the feeling of community is strong, and people do tend to help each other wherever possible. The church is open regularly and really is worth a view, while the views from the door are breathtaking.

The parish was formed on 1 April 1986 from "Great Edstone" and "Little Edstone".

== St Michael and All Angels Church, Great Edstone ==
St Michael's Church, Great Edstone is a grade II* listed building dating from the 13th century. Over the south door of the church is a Saxon dial with an inscription, similar to that at Kirkdale sundial, but not so perfect.

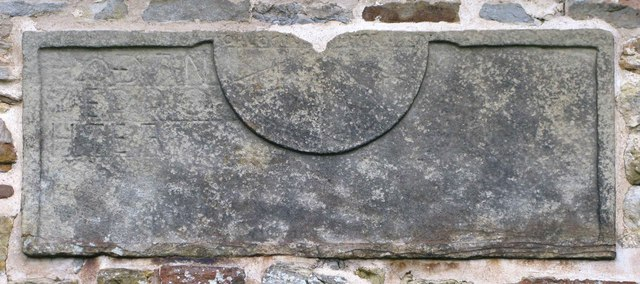

== Population ==
According to the latest census of 2011 it has a population of 217 residents. The population has increased from the 2001 census, when the population was 192.

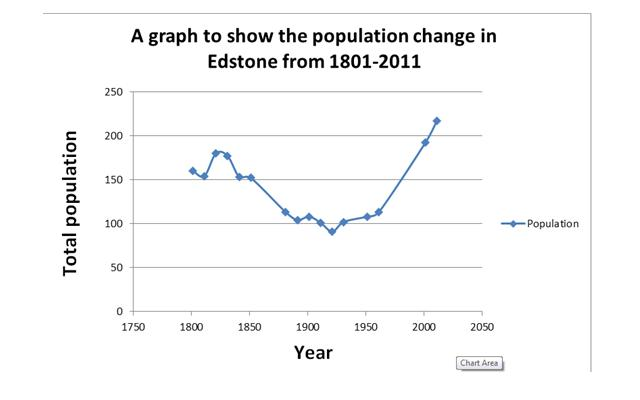
Graph of the population change in Edstone from 1881 to 2011

This population graph shows an overall increase over 130 years from 1881 to 2011 in terms of the number of residents that have moved into the village of Edstone. However, the most noticeable difference being within a 50-year time period, from 1961 where the population rapidly increased from 113 residents to 217 residents in 2011 (Census data) an overall increase of 105 inhabitants. Although, prior to the 1961 population of Edstone, the general trend saw the population decrease by 89 residents from 1821 to 1921.

== Buildings and features ==
The most prominent and perhaps the oldest building is The Manor House, a house visible from many miles away.

== See also ==
- Listed buildings in Edstone
