= Kirkdale Cave =

Cave in North Yorkshire, England

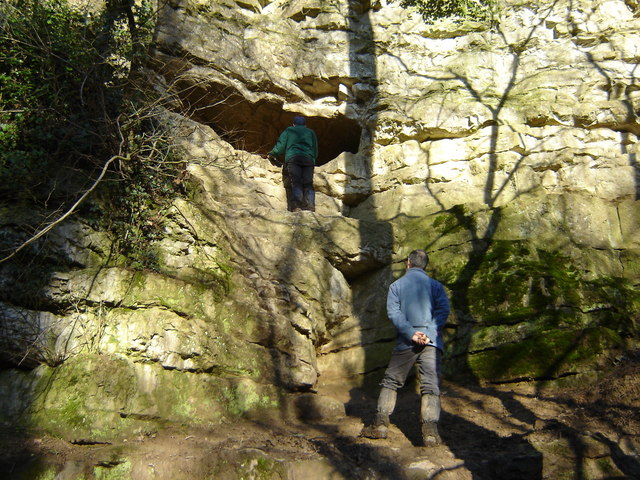
- Entrance to Kirkdale Cave

- Location within North Yorkshire
- Location: Vale of Pickering, North Yorkshire, England
- OS grid: SE 6784 8560
- Coordinates: 54°15′42″N 0°57′36″W
- Length: 436 metres (1,430 ft)
- Elevation: 58 metres (190 ft)
- Discovery: 1821
- Geology: Jurassic Corallian Limestone
- Entrances: 1
- Access: Entrance is in face of old quarry

Kirkdale Cave is a cave and fossil site located in Kirkdale near Kirkbymoorside in the Vale of Pickering, North Yorkshire, England. It was discovered by workmen in 1821, and found to contain fossilized bones of a variety of mammals from the Eemian interglacial (globally known as the Last Interglacial, ~130-115,000 years ago), when temperatures were comparable to contemporary times, including animals currently absent from Britain or globally extinct, including hippopotamuses (amongst the farthest north any such remains have been found), straight-tusked elephants, the narrow-nosed rhinoceros, and cave hyenas.

William Buckland analyzed the cave and its contents in December 1821 and determined that the bones were the remains of animals brought in by hyenas who used it for a den, and not a result of the Biblical flood floating corpses in from distant lands, as he had first thought. His reconstruction of an ancient ecosystem from detailed analysis of fossil evidence was admired at the time, and considered to be an example of how geo-historical research should be done.

The cave was extended from its original length of 175 metres (574 ft) to 436 metres (1,430 ft) by Scarborough Caving Club in 1995. A survey was published in Descent magazine.

== Contents ==
The fossil bones found in the cave included those of straight-tusked elephants, hippopotamuses, the narrow-nosed rhinoceros, cave hyena, cave lion, Irish elk, brown bears, red deer and fallow deer. These have been dated to the Eemian interglacial (also known as the Ipswichian in Britain or the Last Interglacial globally) around 130-115,000 years ago, when temperatures were comparable to those in Britain today, based uranium-series dating of a calcite layer above the bone deposits dating to 121,000 ± 4,000 years Before Present. Aside from the reported discovery of hippopotamus remains in Stockton-on-Tees, this is the northernmost site in the world where hippopotamus remains have been found. It also included a considerable amount of fossilized hyena faeces. The fossilized remains were embedded in a silty layer sandwiched between layers of stalagmite.

== Discovery and analysis ==
The discovery at Kirkdale occurred in the wake of new forms of stratigraphic dating developed during the Enlightenment. As was the case for many nineteenth century fossils, the bones in Kirkdale were originally found by local inhabitants. The entrance to the cave was found by limestone quarry workers in the summer of 1821. The quarry workers assumed that the abundant bones buried in the cave floor were the remains of cattle that had been dumped in the cave after dying from some past epidemic. They used some of the bones to fill potholes in a nearby road, where an amateur naturalist noticed them and realized that they were not the remains of livestock. This attracted the attention of numerous fossil collectors. Some of the fossils were sent to William Clift the curator of the museum of the Royal College of Surgeons; he identified some of the bones as the remains of hyenas larger than any of the modern species. At the same time, William Buckland was told about the cave and shown some of the fossils by a colleague at Oxford.

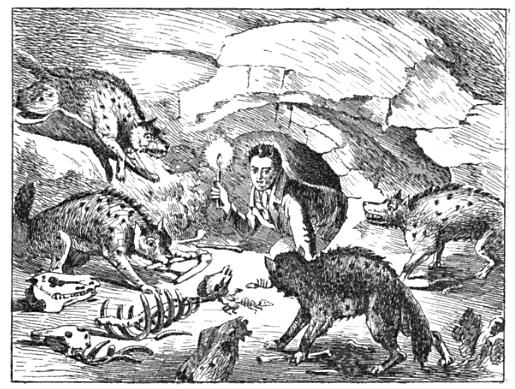
William Conybeare drew this cartoon of Buckland poking his head into a prehistoric hyena den in 1822 to celebrate Buckland's ground-breaking analysis of the fossils found in Kirkdale Cave.

Buckland began his investigation believing that the fossils in the cave were diluvial, that is that they had been deposited there by a deluge that had washed them from far away, possibly the Biblical flood. Upon further investigation, he realized the cave had never been open to the surface through its roof, and that the only entrance was too small for the carcasses of animals as large as elephants or hippos to have floated in. He began to suspect that the animals had lived in the local area, and that the hyenas had used the cave as a den and brought in remains of the various animals they fed on. This hypothesis was supported by the fact that many of the bones showed signs of having been gnawed prior to fossilization, and by the presence of objects which Buckland suspected to be fossilized hyena dung. Further analysis, including comparison with the dung of modern spotted hyenas living in menageries, confirmed the identification of the fossilized dung.

He published his analysis in an 1822 paper he read to the Royal Society. A few days before reading the formal paper, he gave the following colourful account at a dinner held by the Geological Society:

The hyaenas, gentlemen, preferred the flesh of elephants, rhinoceros, deer, cows, horses, etc., but sometimes, unable to procure these, & half starved, they used to come out of the narrow entrance of their cave in the evening down to the water's edge of a lake which must once have been there, & so helped themselves to some of the innumerable water-rats in wh[ich] the lake abounded.

He developed these ideas further in his 1823 book Reliquiae Diluvianae; or, Observations on the organic remains contained in caves, fissures, and diluvial gravel, and on other geological phenomena, attesting the action of an universal deluge, challenging the belief that the bones were brought to the cave by Noah's flood and providing detailed evidence that instead hyenas had used the cave as a den into which they brought the bones of their prey.

== Impact and legacy ==
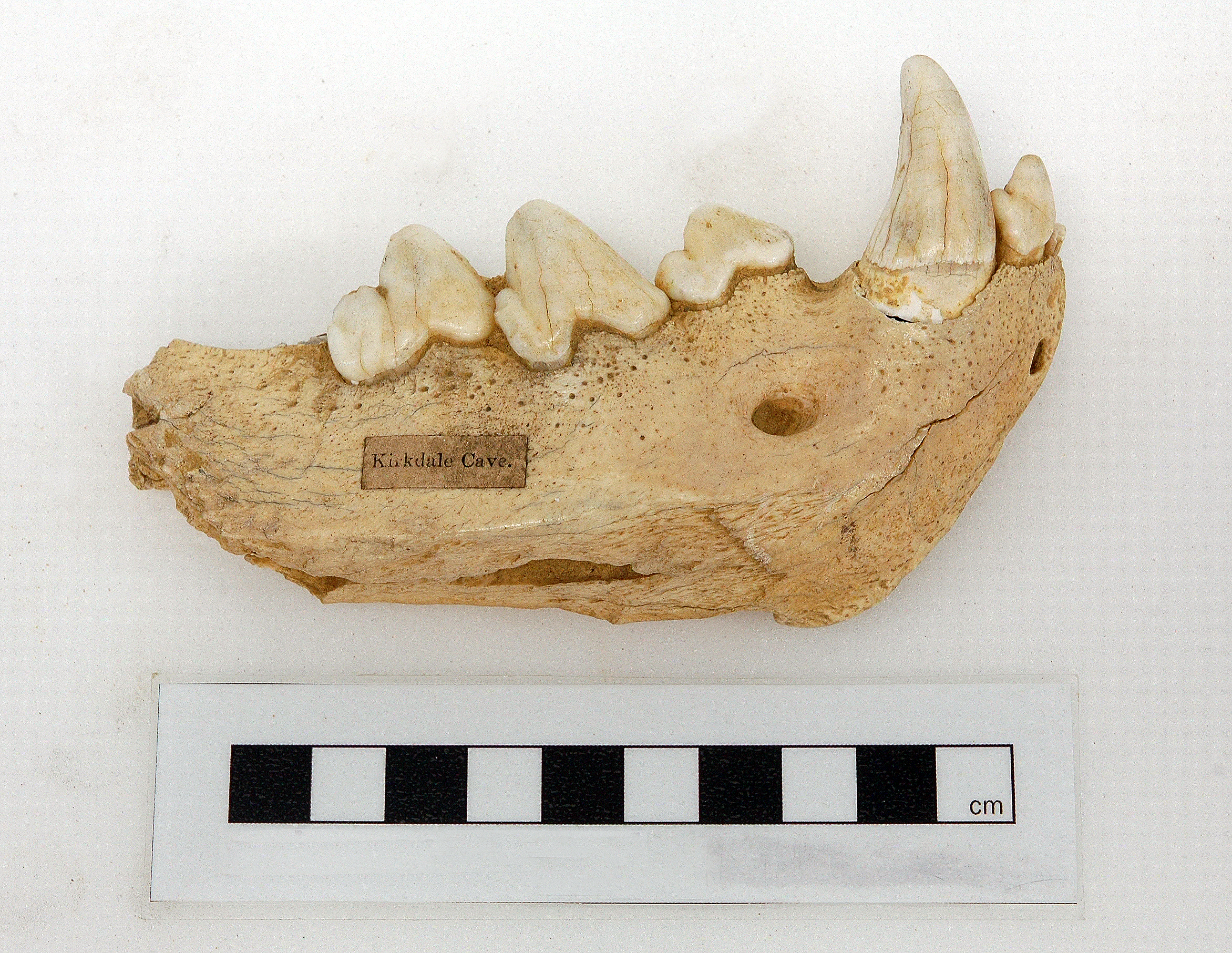
Kirkdale Cave Hyena mandible now in the Yorkshire Museum

The specimens were an original part of the archaeology collection of the Yorkshire Museum and it is said that "the scientific interest aroused founded the Yorkshire Philosophical Society". While criticized by some, William Buckland's analysis of Kirkland Cave and other bone caves was widely seen as a model for how careful analysis could be used to reconstruct the Earth's past, and the Royal Society awarded William Buckland the Copley Medal in 1822 for his Kirkdale paper. At the presentation the society's president, Humphry Davy, said:

by these inquiries, a distinct epoch has, as it were, been established in the history of the revolutions of our globe: a point fixed from which our researches may be pursued through the immensity of ages, and the records of animate nature, as it were, carried back to the time of the creation.

== Region ==
The cave is a Site of Special Scientific Interest and a Geological Conservation Review site.

The Saxon St Gregory's Minster with its unusual sundial is nearby.
