= Sleightholme Dale =

Valley in North Yorkshire, England

Coordinates: 54.304°N 1.00°W

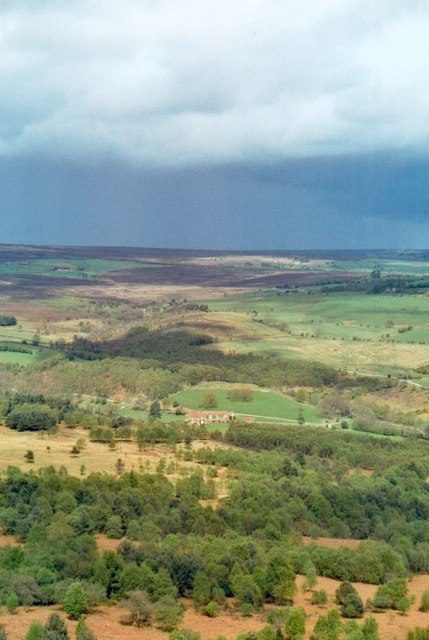
View into the valley

Sleightholme Dale, sometimes spelt in one word, Sleightholmedale, is a valley in the North York Moors in North Yorkshire, England. The dale is the middle section of the valley of Hodge Beck (a tributary of the River Dove), below Bransdale and above Kirkdale.

28.7 hectares (71 acres) of the dale is designated a Site of Special Scientific Interest, notified in 1987. The site includes woodland and fen, and includes a heronry, one of the largest in North Yorkshire.
