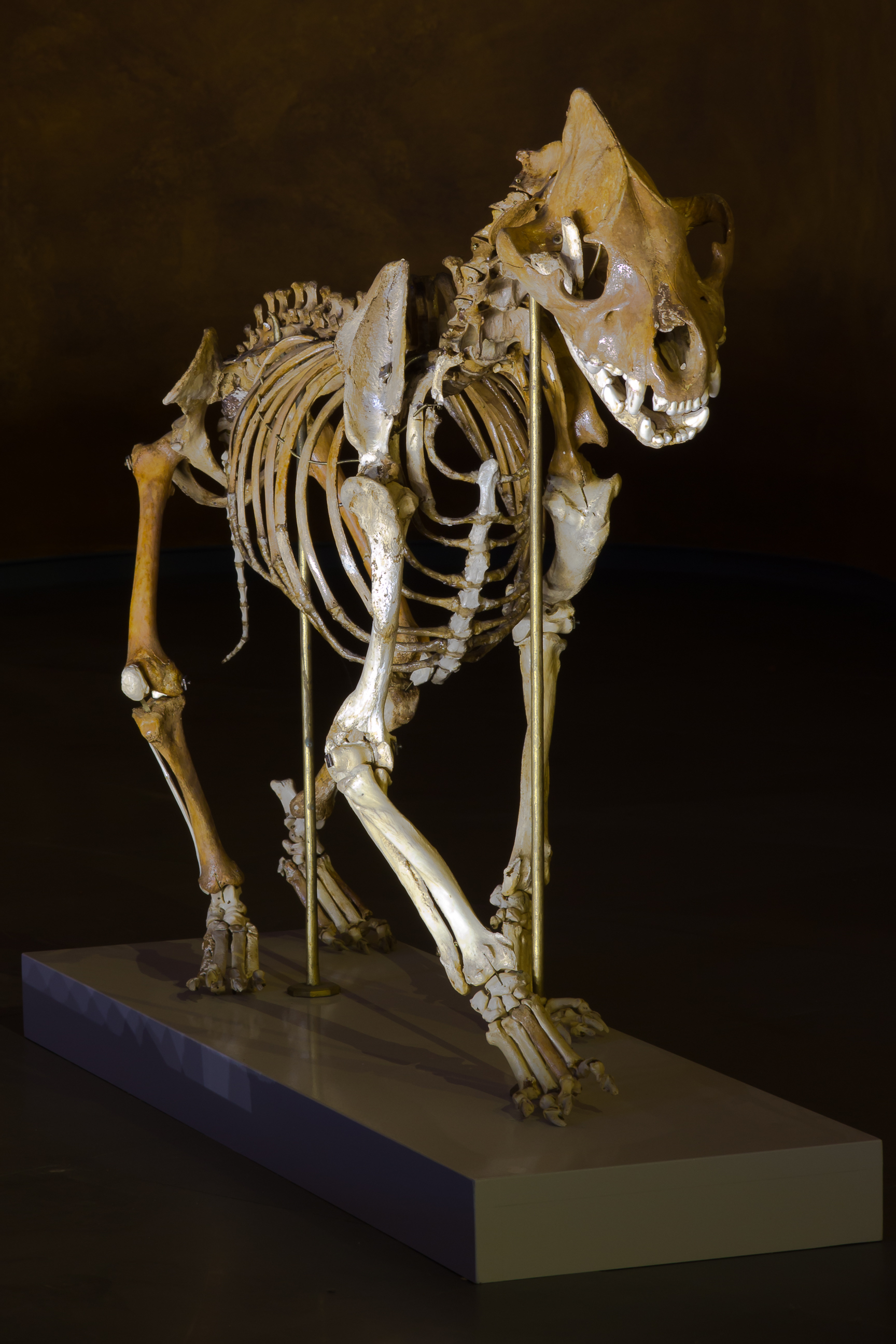
- Crocuta crocuta spelaea skeleton from the Muséum de Toulouse.

Scientific classification
- Kingdom: Animalia
- Phylum: Chordata
- Class: Mammalia
- Order: Carnivora
- Family: Hyaenidae
- Subfamily: Hyaeninae
- Genus: Crocuta

Species or subspecies
- Crocuta (crocuta) spelaea Goldfuss, 1823; Crocuta (crocuta) ultima (Matsumoto, 1915)

= Cave hyena =

Cave hyena Temporal range: Middle to Late Pleistocene, 0.5–0.020 Ma Possible Holocene records

Extinct subspecies of carnivore

Cave hyenas (Crocuta (crocuta) spelaea and Crocuta (crocuta) ultima) are extinct species or subspecies of hyena known from Eurasia, which ranged from Western Europe and West Asia to eastern Siberia, East Asia and Southeast Asia during the Pleistocene epoch. They are well represented in many caves, primarily dating to the Last Glacial Period. Cave hyenas served as apex predators that preyed on large mammals (primarily large ungulates, such as wild horse, steppe bison and aurochs), and were responsible for the accumulation of hundreds of large Pleistocene mammal bones in areas including horizontal caves, sinkholes, mud pits, and muddy areas along rivers. It was one of the main apex predators of northern Eurasian ecosystems alongside the cave lion (Panthera spelaea), with the two species likely engaging in hostile conflict over carcasses. Much like African spotted hyenas, they likely lived in clans.

Often treated as subspecies or populations of the living African spotted hyena (Crocuta crocuta) to which they were closely related and heavily resembled (though considerably larger in size), genetic evidence from the nuclear genome suggests that Eurasian Crocuta populations (including the west Eurasian Crocuta crocuta spelaea and Asian Crocuta crocuta ultima) were highly genetically divergent from African populations (having estimated to have split over 1 million years ago), with evidence suggesting limited interbreeding between Eurasian cave and African spotted hyenas. Some authors have suggested that the two subspecies should be raised to species level as Crocuta spelaea and Crocuta ultima.

Cave hyenas coexisted in Europe alongside both Neanderthals and modern humans. Evidence suggests that they consumed the remains of Neanderthals at least on occasion, with cave hyenas also being recorded in cave art.

The cause of the cave hyena's extinction is not fully understood, though it could have been due to a combination of factors, including human activity, diminished quantities of prey animals, and climate change.

== Description ==
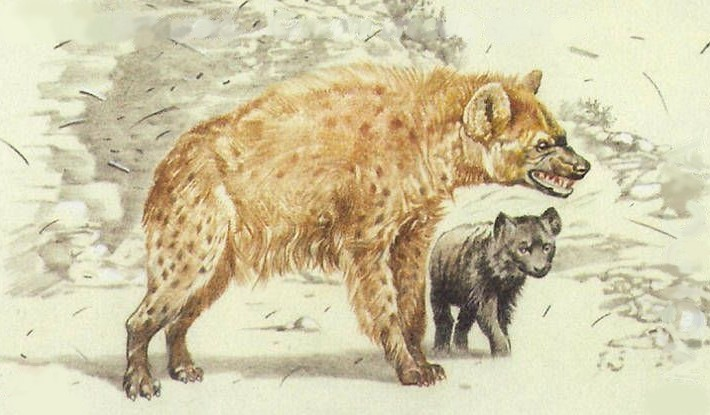
Cave hyena with cub, depicted on a Moldovan postage stamp

The size of cave hyenas varied depending on environment, with populations inhabiting colder climates having a larger body size than those inhabiting more temperate climates; thus, the species is an example of Bergmann's rule. A 2017 study estimated that on average cave hyenas weighed approximately 88 kilograms (194 lb), around 60% heavier than living spotted hyenas. In comparison to living spotted hyenas, some of the bones of the limbs are more robust (proportionally thicker and shorter), with the ulna being more curved. In the skull, the first and second upper premolars contact each other, while in living spotted hyenas they are separated by a diastema (gap), though collectively the differences between the skeletal anatomy of cave hyenas and living spotted hyenas are "relatively minor". The dental anatomy of Asian C. (crocuta) ultima, has been described as indistinguishable from that of European C. (Crocuta) spelaea. The endocast (brain cavity) of cave hyenas were more similar to spotted hyenas than brown or striped hyenas. Compared to spotted hyenas, the cave hyenas had a larger and elongated brain, as well as having smaller relative anterior regions. Evidence from cave art suggests that cave hyenas had a similar physical appearance to living spotted hyenas, with a spotted pelt.

== Distribution and evolution ==
Approximate range of Crocuta in Eurasia during the Middle-Late Pleistocene

Crocuta first appeared outside of Africa in Asia during the Early Pleistocene around 2 million years ago, before arriving in Europe at the beginning of the Middle Pleistocene around 800,000 years ago, around the time of the extinction of the "giant hyena" Pachycrocuta brevirostris in the region.

Crocuta was widely distributed across northern Eurasia during the Middle-Late Pleistocene, spanning from the Iberian Peninsula, Britain and Ireland in the West, across southern Siberia, Mongolia and northern China to the Pacific Coast of the Russian Far East and North Korea. They ranged as far south as Uzbekistan in Central Asia and Azerbaijan in the Caucasus. C. c. ultima at times ranged as far southeast as Guangxi and Taiwan in southern China, as well as Thailand (southwards to peninsular Thailand), Cambodia and Laos in Southeast Asia. Crocuta hyenas also ranged into the Middle East, as far south as the Judaean Desert in Israel and the Nefud Desert in northern Saudi Arabia, and as far east as the Zagros Mountains of western Iran. Although records of Croctua are known from the Siwalik Hills of the northern Indian subcontinent dating to the Early Pleistocene, only a few records of Crocuta have been reported probably dating from the Late Pleistocene in the Indian subcontinent, including from Billasurgam Caves and Kurnool Caves in Andhra Pradesh, and from Tamil Nadu. The northernmost records of cave hyenas are from the banks of the Vilyuy River in Northeast Siberia, with indirect evidence of feeding on woolly rhinoceros carcasses suggesting cave hyenas may have reached the far northeast of Siberia near the Arctic circle.

== Ecology ==
=== Habitat ===
Much like African spotted hyenas, they were believed to have lived in clans based on fossils found within caves. Isotopic analysis further support this due to the clusters of isotopic values and limited variation among individuals, in addition to consumption of medium to large sized herbivores. However, because the shape of brain cavity indicates that the front part of the brain of cave hyenas was smaller than that of living spotted hyenas and more similar to that of non-social hyenas, some researchers have hypothesized that cave hyenas were less social than living spotted hyenas.

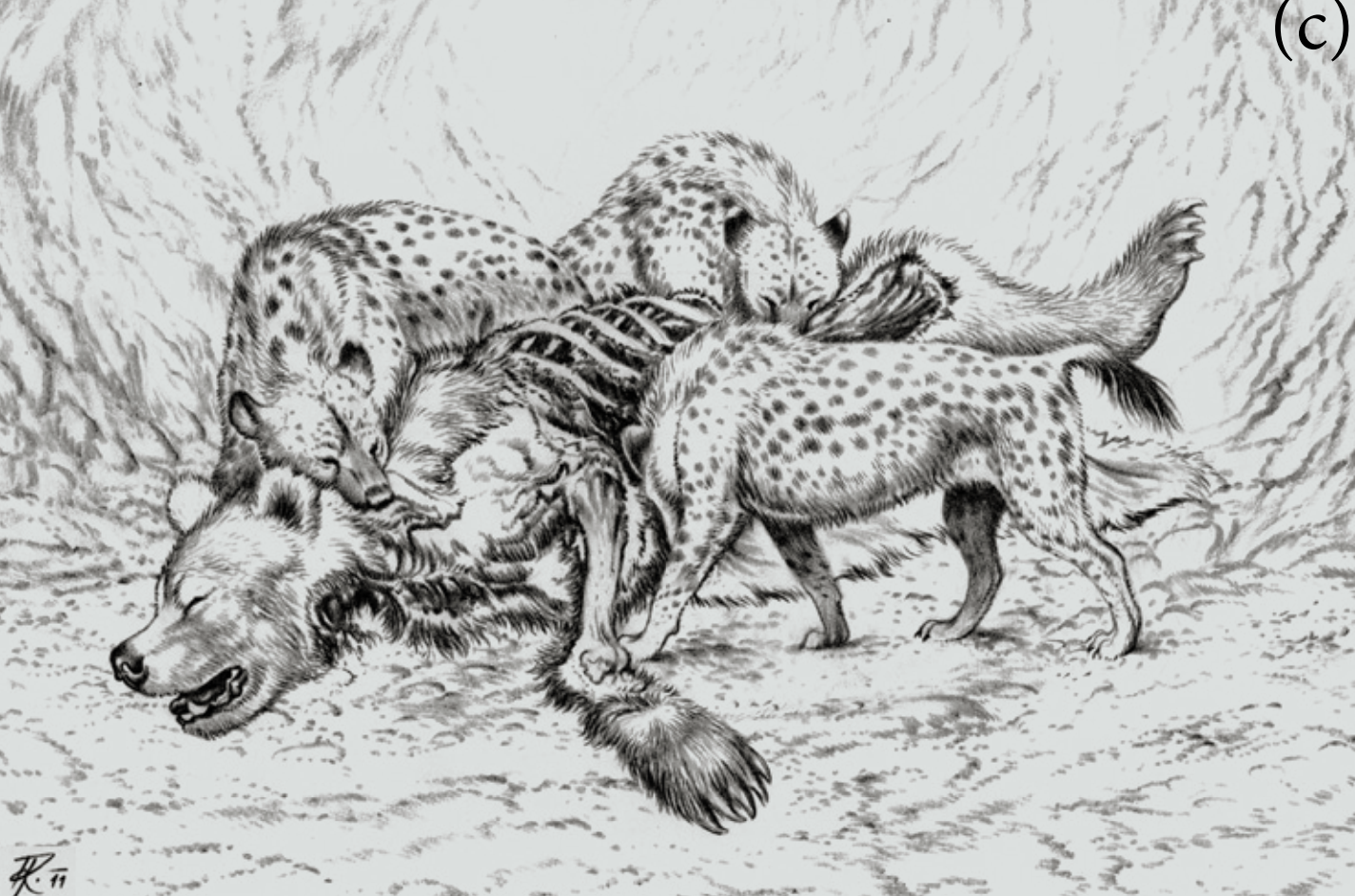
Illustration of cave hyenas consuming a cave bear carcass

While "cave hyenas" did use caves, they were not confined to them, being present where caves were absent, and where present only using caves intermittently, with some examples of open-air dens having been found in the fossil record, such as at Bottrop in Germany. The habitat of cave hyenas was highly variable, spanning from frigid steppe-tundra, to tropical savannah.

=== Diet ===
The cave hyena's diet probably differed little from contemporary African spotted hyenas, and like living spotted hyenas, cave hyenas probably lived in groups (which in living spotted hyenas are called "clans") and were active predators rather than purely scavengers (with hunting being predominant over scavenging in the living spotted hyena). The bones of cave hyena prey were often cracked open/crushed in order to feed on the interior marrow, as is done by living spotted hyenas. Dental microwear indicates both adult and juvenile cave hyenas consumed copious amounts of bones.

The diet of the cave hyena is thought to have primarily consisted of large ungulates like wild horse, aurochs, steppe bison, Irish elk/giant deer, wild boar, red deer and reindeer, with larger herbivores like the woolly rhinoceros and woolly mammoth probably being scavenged after death (or alternatively generally only targeted when weak), with their young perhaps sometimes being targeted for active hunting.

Wild horse are common in Late Pleistocene European cave hyena dens, implying that they were frequent prey, as zebras are for modern African spotted hyenas. In karst cave sites in the Czech Republic which accumulated during the Last Glacial Period, wild horses as well as woolly rhinoceros are the most common remains in cave hyena dens (though this to a significant degree probably reflects the durability of woolly rhinoceros bones making them able to be identified), with other remains including steppe bison, red deer, reindeer, European wild ass, chamois, alpine ibex, and cave bears (who may have been scavenged after dying in the caves). At the Fouvent-Saint-Andoche karst in France, a similar assemblage is found, albeit also including juvenile woolly mammoths, reflecting the similar cold conditions in both regions during the Last Glacial Period. At Perspektywiczna Cave in Poland, the assemblage is dominated by reindeer, with other remains present including bovids, equines, woolly rhinoceros and woolly mammoth. In Prolom 2 grotto in Crimea, the assemblage is dominated by saiga antelope, along with a smaller amount of wild horse, European wild ass and steppe bison. An assemblage of wild horse, steppe bison, elk and probably scavenged woolly rhinoceros, along with a small amount of long-tailed goral, moose, wild boar and Siberian musk deer, is known from the Geographical Society cave in Primorsky Krai in the Russian Far East. In Bukhtarminskaya Cave in Eastern Kazakhstan, the assemblage consists of wild horse, red deer, Siberian roe deer, and the large camel Camelus knoblochi, with additional fragmentary remains of woolly mammoth and woolly rhinoceros.

At the Grotta Paglicci den in southern Italy, the assemblage is dominated by European fallow deer, red deer, roe deer and aurochs. At San Teodoro cave in northern Sicily which is a well known hyena den, remains of herbivores likely accumulated in the cave by hyenas include those of aurochs, steppe bison (with aurochs seeming to predominate over bison), European wild ass, wild boar, red deer, and the endemic dwarf elephant Palaeoloxodon mnaidriensis. At Kirkdale Cave in Yorkshire, northern England which dates to the Last Interglacial when Europe had a temperate climate similar to modern times, the assemblage includes juvenile straight-tusked elephant, Irish elk, red deer, European fallow deer, bison, and the narrow-nosed rhinoceros. At the Manot Cave site in northern Israel, the bone assemblage accumulated by cave hyenas is predominantly Persian fallow deer, as well as to a lesser extent goats, aurochs and equines. At Wezmeh Cave in the Zagros Mountains of western Iran, dating to the Last Glacial Period, remains include mouflon, wild goat, red deer, aurochs, wild boar, gazelles, and the narrow-nosed rhinoceros. At the Boh Dambang cave site in Cambodia, the assemblage includes wild boar, gaur, water buffalo, serow, sambar deer, Eld's deer, southern red muntjac and indeterminate rhinoceroses.

=== Competition ===
Pathological evidence suggests much like spotted hyenas, during intraspecific conflicts, cave hyenas focused on the hind limbs. Cave hyenas also appear to have extensively engaged in cannibalism, demonstrated as numerous sites.

Cave hyenas likely came into conflict with cave lions (which despite their name, probably only rarely if ever used caves) over carcasses, with remains of cave lions found in European cave deposits possibly being the result of being brought into the cave by cave hyenas. A significant number of these cave lion remains do not bear any evidence of consumption, which may suggest that like living spotted hyenas, they did not generally consume the remains of lions after killing them. Cave lion cubs and juveniles, have also been reported in cave hyena dens. Weakened or ill cave lions may also enter caves to hunt cave bears or steal prey from cave hyenas, which may have resulted in their deaths by cave hyenas. The high number of male cave lions found in some caves such as the Zoolithen cave suggests male cave lions may have gone for antagonism and active hyena killings in their dens. Additionally, bite marks on several cave hyena skulls may suggest that cave lions were attacking cave hyenas by biting the skull. However isotopic analysis suggests that cave hyenas may have competitively excluded cave lions from large prey due to their social lifestyle and were likely the dominant predators of the mammoth steppe.

== History of discovery and classification ==
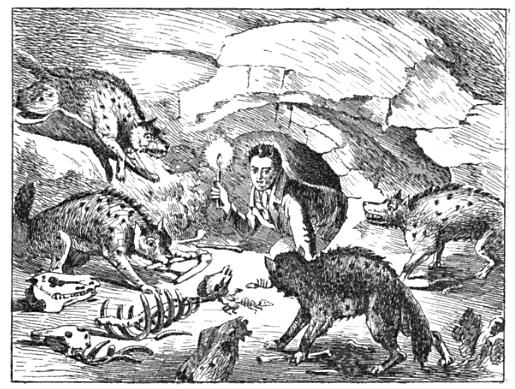
Cartoon by William Conybeare (1822) of Buckland discovering the Kirkdale hyena dens.

Although the first full account of the cave hyena was given by Georges Cuvier in 1812, skeletal fragments of the cave hyena have been described in scientific literature since the 18th century, though they were frequently misidentified. The first recorded mention of the cave hyena in literature occurs in Kundmann's 1737 tome Rariora Naturæ et Artis, where the author misidentified a hyena's mandibular ramus as that of a calf. In 1774, Esper erroneously described hyena teeth discovered in Gailenreuth as those of a lion, and in 1784, Collini described a cave hyena skull as that of a seal. The past presence of hyenas in Great Britain was revealed after William Buckland's examination of the contents of Kirkdale Cave, which was discovered to have once been the location of several hyena den sites. Buckland's findings were followed by further discoveries by Clift and Whidbey in Oreston, Plymouth. In the 1770s, Zoolithen Cave in Germany gained scientific attention due to the remains of fossil animals found within. In 1822 a skull from this cave was used to describe the species Hyena spelaea by German paleontologist Georg August Goldfuss.

In his own 1812 account, Cuvier mentioned a number of European localities where cave hyena remains were found, and considered it a different species from the spotted hyena on account of its superior size. He elaborated his view in his Ossemens Fossiles (1823), noting how the cave hyena's digital extremities were shorter and thicker than those of the spotted hyena. His views were largely accepted throughout the first half of the 19th century, finding support in de Blainville and Richard Owen among others. Further justifications in separating the two animals included differences in the tubercular portion of the lower carnassial. Boyd Dawkins, writing in 1865, was the first to definitely cast doubt over the separation of the spotted and cave hyena, stating that the aforementioned tooth characteristics were consistent with mere individual variation. Writing again in 1877, he further stated after comparing the two animals' skulls that there are no characters of specific value.

Crocuta (crocuta) ultima was originally named by Japanese paleontologist Matsumoto Hikoshichirō in 1915 as Hyaena ultima, based on a single upper fourth premolar (P^{4}) found in "a certain marly district of Szechuan, China.", which was recognised as belonging to Crocuta in a 1956 publication by Björn Kurtén. However, Cajus Diedrich suggested in 2021 that C. c. ultima should be considered invalid due to being based on only a single tooth of uncertain stratigraphic provenance, which he argued could not even be attributed with certainty to Crocuta, though the name remains in widespread use to refer to East Asian Crocuta remains.

Some recent authors have argued that Crocuta crocuta spelaea and Crocuta crocuta ultima raised to species level as Crocuta spelaea and Crocuta ultima based on morphological and genetic differences between them and living African spotted hyenas.

=== Genetics ===
Analysis of the mitochondrial genomes of Eurasian Crocuta specimens shows no clear separation from African lineages. However, an analysis of full nuclear genomes of both European and East Asian cave hyenas published in 2020 suggests that African and Eurasian Crocuta populations were largely separate, having estimated to have diverged from each other around 2.5 million years ago, closely corresponding to the age of the earliest Crocuta specimens in Eurasia, which are around 2 million years old from China. The nuclear genome results also suggested that the European and East Asian populations (often assigned to the separate subspecies C. crocuta ultima) were strongly genetically divergent from each other, but were more closely related to each other overall than to African Crocuta populations. Analysis of the nuclear genome suggests that there had been interbreeding between these populations for some time after the split, which likely explains the discordance between the nuclear and mitochondrial genome results, with the mitochondrial genomes of African and European Crocuta more closely related to each other than to East Asian Crocuta, suggesting gene flow between the two groups after the split between the East Asian and European populations. A 2024 study of a cave hyena genome from Sicily found that as with the 2020 study, there was strong genetic separation between Eurasian cave and African spotted hyenas, but unlike the 2020 study, there was no robust support for a basal split between East Asian/Siberian and European cave hyenas, with the Sicilian cave hyena found to be the earliest diverging cave hyena lineage, with less interbreeding with African hyenas than other European cave hyenas.

== Relationships with humans ==
=== Interactions ===
Kills partially processed by Neanderthals and then by cave hyenas indicate that hyenas would occasionally steal Neanderthal kills; further, cave hyenas and Neanderthals competed for cave sites. Many caves show alternating occupations by hyenas and Neanderthals. There is fossil evidence of archaic humans, including Neanderthals, in Middle Pleistocene Europe butchering hyenas, likely for their pelts (as evidenced by cut marks on phalange bones, such as at the Navalmaíllo rock shelter in Spain, which would have been unlikely targets for meat butchery) and possibly for their meat, though such records are highly rare, even in comparison to other carnivores, being documented at maximum at only 13 sites in Western Europe. At least some of these sites may represent the result of opportunistic butchering of already dead hyenas rather than active confrontation. Early humans may have also made pendants from cave hyena teeth. At a number of cave hyena den sites, the remains of Neanderthals have been found showing evidence of having been gnawed on by the hyenas, this may be the result of cave hyenas scavenging Neanderthal burials, though some of these remains may also be the result of cave hyenas attacking and killing Neanderthals.

=== In rock art ===
The cave hyena rarely appears in Paleolithic rock art, which has been theorised to be due to the animal's lower rank in the animal worship hierarchy; the cave hyena's appearance was likely unappealing to Ice Age hunters in comparison to cave lions, and it was not sought after as prey, nor was it as imposing as the woolly mammoth or woolly rhinoceros. Nevertheless, the cave hyena is depicted in a few examples of Upper Palaeolithic rock art in France.

Rock art from France depicting cave hyenas

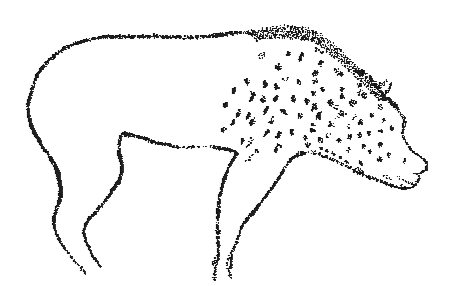
Chauvet Cave, Ardèche: hyena outlined and represented in profile, with two legs, with its head and front part with well distinguishable spotted coloration pattern. Because of the specimen's steeped profile, it is thought that the painting was originally meant to represent a cave bear, but was modified as a hyena.

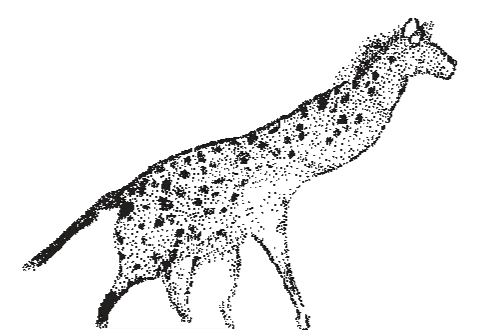
Diverticule axial, Lascaux: hyena depicted in profile, with four limbs, showing an animal with a steep back. The body and the long neck have spots, including the flanks.

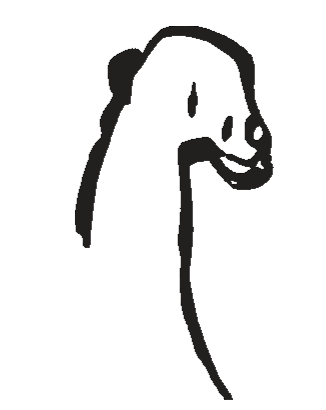
Le Portel Cave, Ariège: incompletely outlined and deeply engraved figure, representing a part of an elongated neck, smoothly passing into part of the animal's forelimb on the proximal side. Its head is in profile, with a possibly re-engraved muzzle.

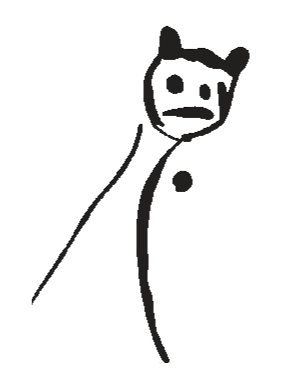
Le Gabillou Cave, Dordogne: deeply engraved zoomorphic figure with a head in frontal view and an elongated neck with part of the forelimb in profile. It has large round eyes and short, rounded ears which are set far from each other. It has a broad, line-like mouth that evokes a smile. Though originally thought to represent a composite or zoomorphic hybrid, it is probable it is a cave hyena based on its broad muzzle and long neck.

== Extinction ==
A 2014 study concluded that the youngest well-dated remains of cave hyenas in Europe date to around 31,000 years ago, though a subsequently radiocarbon dated specimen from Germany suggests that they survived in Europe until at least 24,000 years ago. Subsequent studies have suggested that cave hyenas may have persisted later in the Iberian Peninsula based on the radiocarbon dating of coprolites attributed to them, possibly as late as 7,000 years ago in the southern Iberian Peninsula, but it is suggested that the dates should be considered with caution due to potential issues with contamination. A 2021 study found the youngest specimens in northeast Asia date to around 20,000 years ago, with cave hyenas suggested to have persisted in Southeast Asia to at least 25-18,000 years ago. Potential causal factors for extinction include decreasing temperatures, competition with other carnivores, including humans for food and living space, and decreased prey abundance. Evidence suggests that climate change alone cannot account for the cave hyena's extinction in Europe and that other factors, such as human activity and decreasing prey abundance, are necessary to explain it.

== Gallery ==
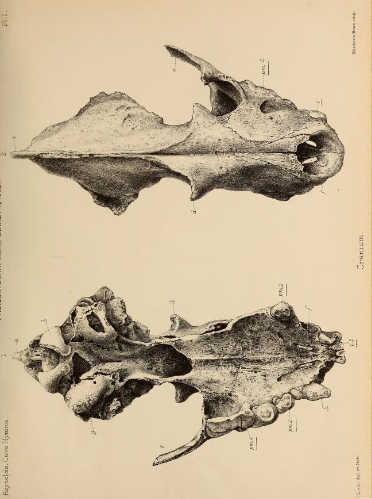
Cranium from Wookey Hole, now in Taunton Museum

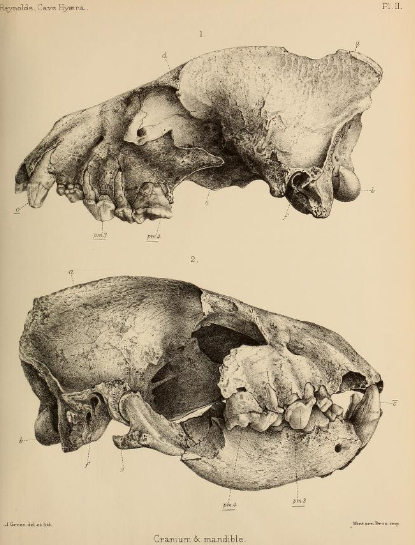
Skull from Wookey Hole, now in Taunton Museum

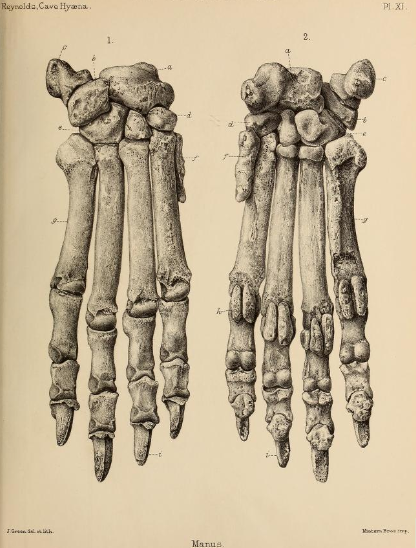
Anterior and posterior views of the right forefoot, from Tor Bryan Caves near Torquay, now kept in British Museum

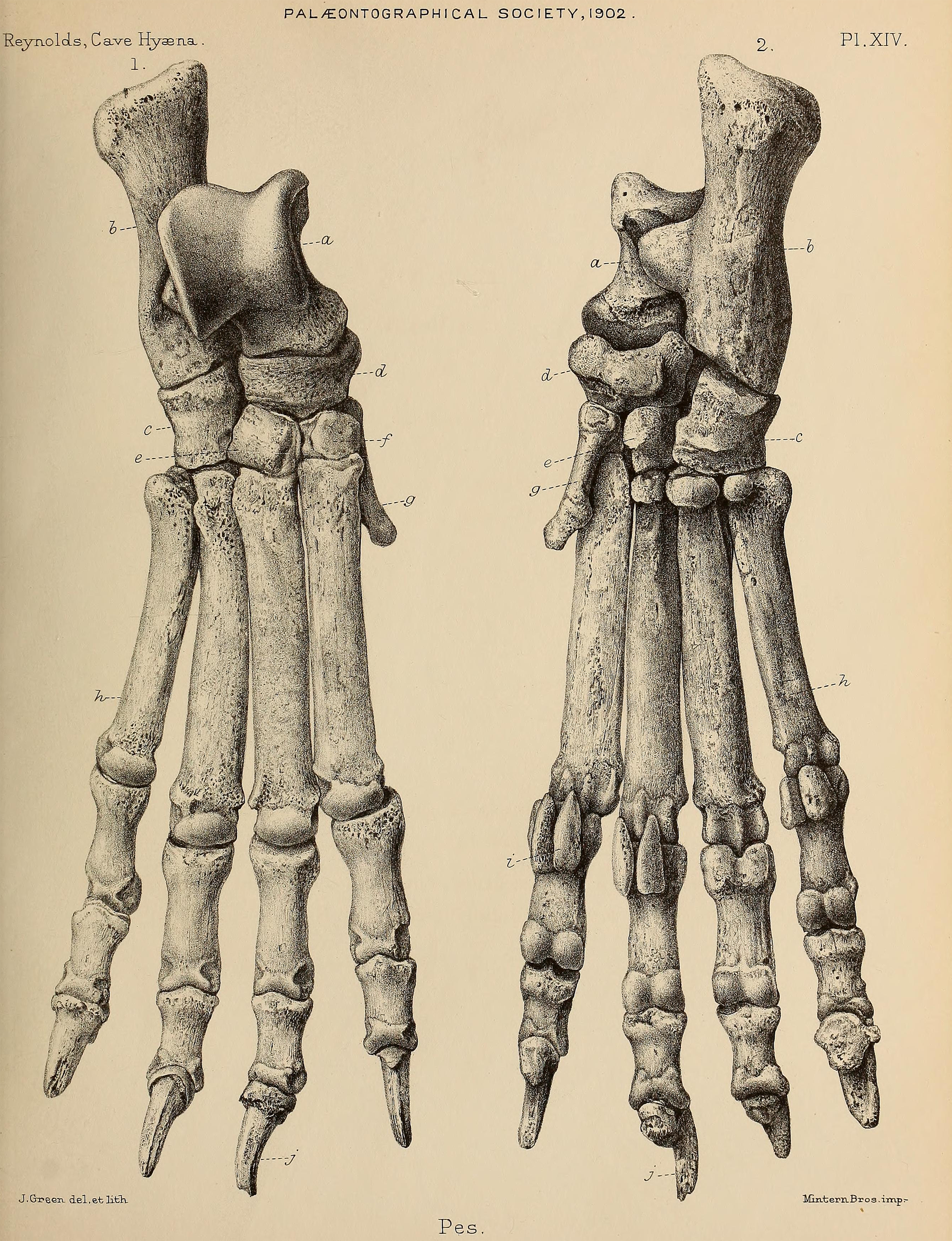
Anterior and posterior views of the right hind foot, from Tor Bryan Caves near Torquay, now kept in British Museum.

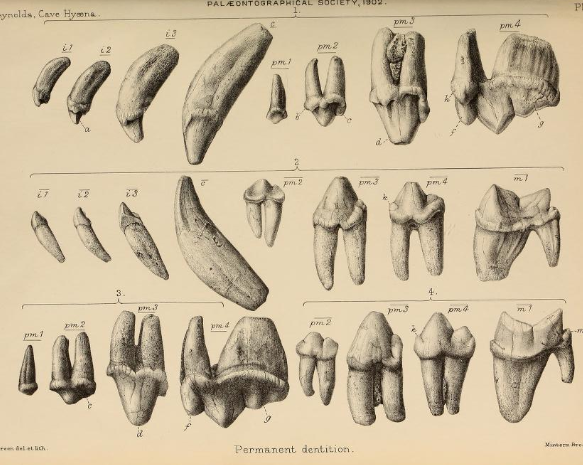
Permanent dentition of a Pleistocene cave hyena from Tor Bryan Caves near Torquay, now kept in British Museum.

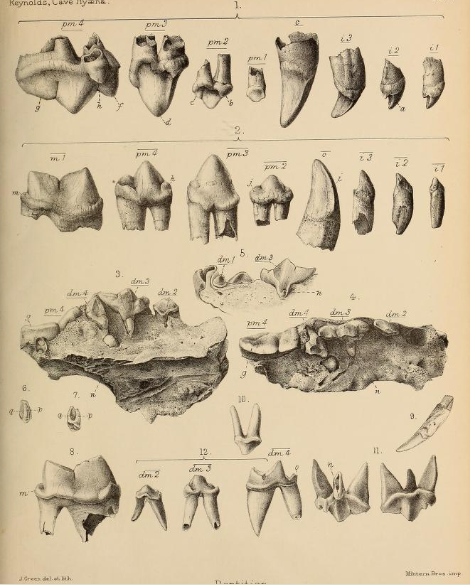
Permanent dentition, from Tor Bryan Caves near Torquay (now kept in British Museum), Creswell Caves in Derbyshire (now kept in Manchester's Owen College Museum), Kirkdale Cave and Wookey Hole (now kept in Oxford Museum).

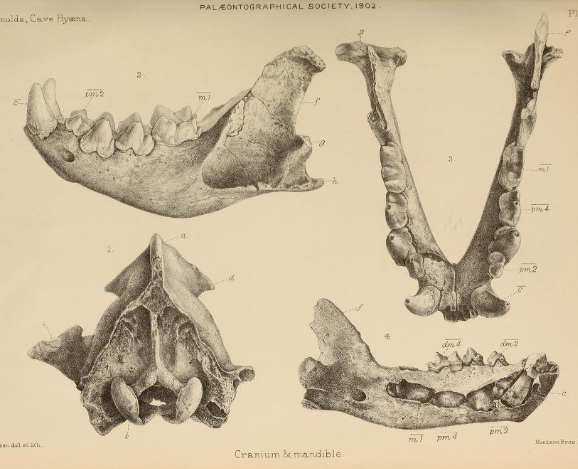
Jaws and cranium from Kent's Hole, Torquay (now in British Museum) and Wookey Hole (now in Taunton Museum).

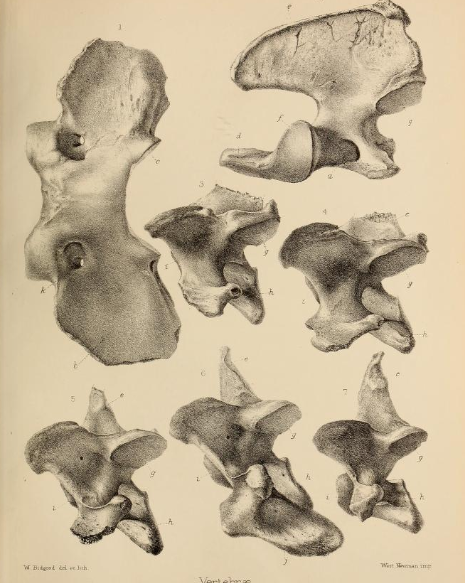
Vertebrae from Wookey Hole (now in Taunton Museum).

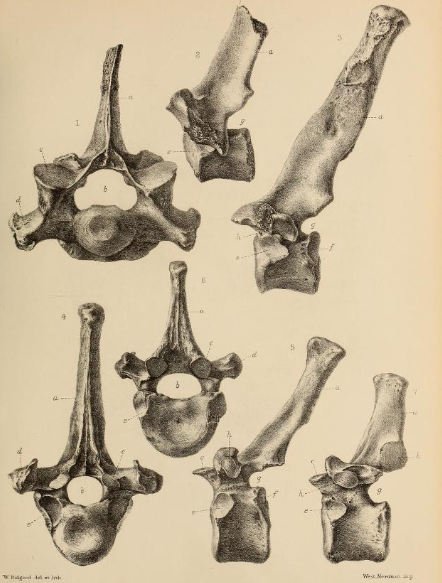
Vertebrae from Wookey Hole (now in Taunton Museum).

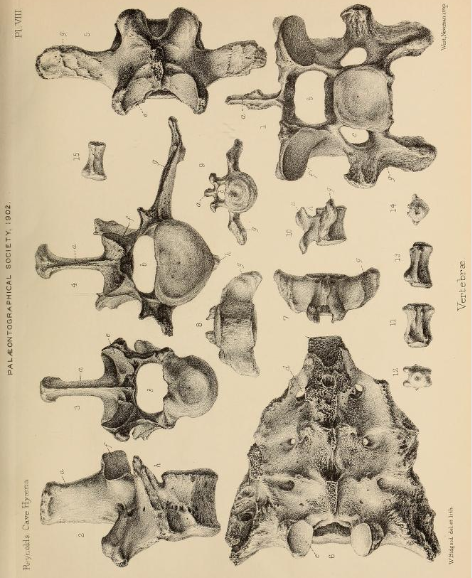
Vertebrae from Wookey Hole (now in Taunton Museum).

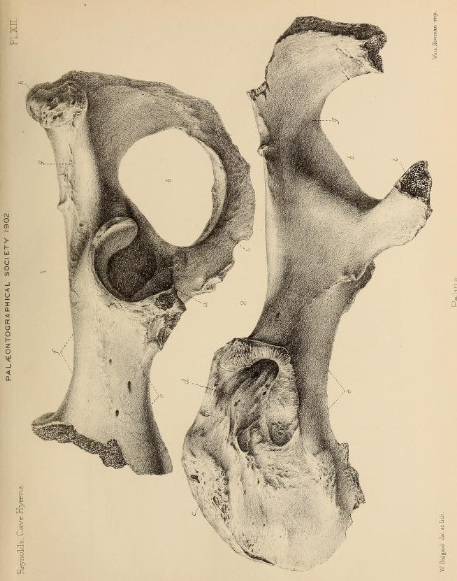
Pelvis from Wookey Hole (now in Taunton Museum).

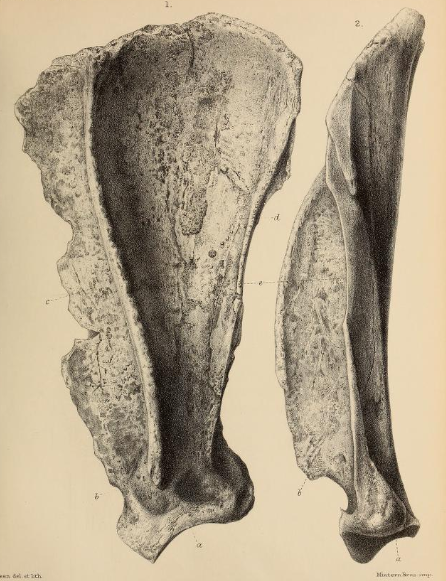
Scapula from Creswell Caves, Derbyshire (now in Owens College Museum, Manchester).

== See also ==
- Pachycrocuta a genus of giant hyena that inhabited Eurasia and Africa during the Early-Middle Pleistocene
