= Listed buildings in Edstone =

Edstone is a civil parish in the county of North Yorkshire, England. It contains six listed buildings that are recorded in the National Heritage List for England. Of these, one is listed at Grade II*, the middle of the three grades, and the others are at Grade II, the lowest grade. The main settlement in the parish is the village of Great Edstone, and the listed buildings consist of a church, a former public house, a house, a chapel and two farmhouses.

== Key ==
Grade	Criteria
II*	Particularly important buildings of more than special interest
II	Buildings of national importance and special interest

== Buildings ==
Name and location	Photograph	Date	Notes	Grade
St Michael's Church; 54.24691°N 0.91874°W		13th century	The church has been altered and extended through the centuries, and it was restored in 1898–99 by C. Hodgson Fowler. It is built in limestone with a slate roof, and consists of a nave and a chancel in one unit. On the west gable is a square timber bellcote with louvred bell openings and a pyramidal roof. The south doorway has voussoirs and a moulded hood mould springing from imposts, and above it is a sundial with an inscription.	II*
Former Grey Horse Inn, outbuilding, wall and railings 54.24713°N 0.91751°W		Early 18th century	The public house, later a private house, and the former smithy to the left, are in stone, a rear outshut is in brick, and they have pantile roofs with coped gables and kneelers. The house has two storeys and three bays, and contains a doorway and horizontally-sliding sash windows. The former smithy has a doorway and casement windows. In front of the garden is a wall in orange-red brick with stone dressings and cast iron railings.	II
Mount Pleasant Farmhouse; 54.24671°N 0.91522°W	—	Mid 18th century	The farmhouse and cottage, later combined, are in limestone with a pantile roof, coped gables and kneelers. There are two storeys, a front of three bays, and a rear outshut. The doorcase has an open dentilled pediment on fluted pilasters and a frieze with masks, and the doorway has a fanlight with radial glazing. The windows are sashes with heavy milled lintels.	II
Great Edstone House; 54.24670°N 0.91783°W	—	Late 18th century	The house, which was extended in the 20th century, is in limestone with a slate roof. The entrance in the street front is in the extension, and is a portico. The original block has two storeys, three bays and a hipped roof. In the centre is a full-height stair window with a semicircular head and a keystone, flanked by sash windows with heavy lintels. In the centre of the garden front is a doorway with a fanlight.	II
Methodist Chapel; 54.24658°N 0.91570°W		1823	The chapel, later a house, is in limestone, and has a pyramidal slate roof with grooved corner scrolls and a ball and pedestal finial. There is a single storey, a square plan and a front of three bays. On the front is a central doorway, flanked by windows, all with pointed arches and Y-tracery.	II
Little Edstone Farmhouse; 54.25229°N 0.91399°W		Early 19th century	The farmhouse is in limestone on a plinth, with quoins, and a pantile roof with coped gables and shaped kneelers. There are two storeys and three bays. In the centre is a timber doorcase with a pediment on square columns, and a doorway with a fanlight with patterned radial glazing. The windows are sashes with heavy lintels and incised keystones.	II
