= St Nicholas' Church, Bransdale =

Grade II church in North Yorkshire, England

Coordinates: 54.3777°N 1.0464°W

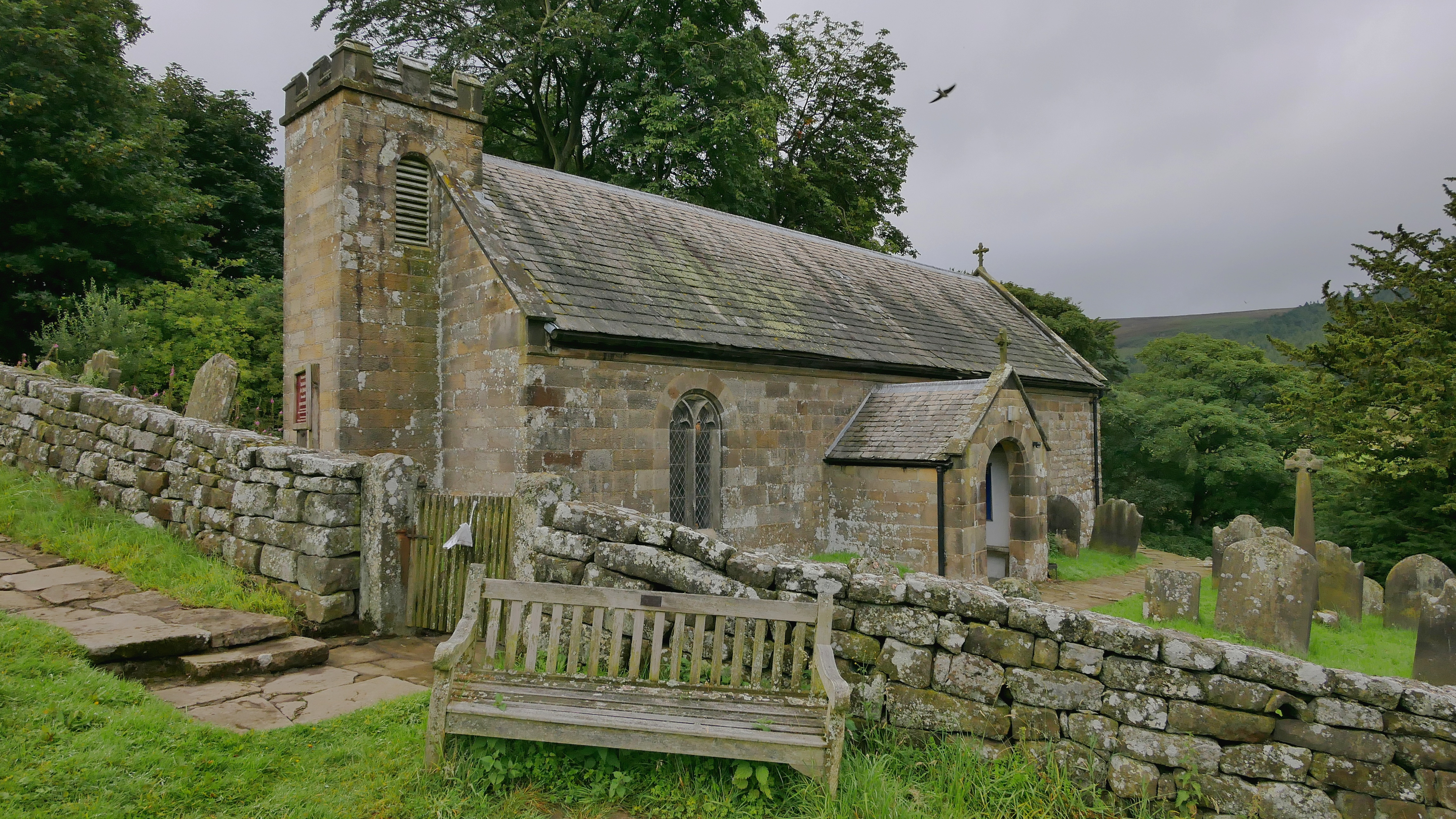
The church, in 2017

St Nicholas' Church is the parish church of Bransdale, North Yorkshire, a village in England.

There was a chapel in Bransdale by the 13th century, probably connected with Keldholme Priory. The current building dates from about 1800, and based on its style, Historic England attributes its design for John Smith of Farndale. The building was reroofed in 1886, and extended in 1934. It was Grade II listed in 1987.

The church is constructed of stone and has a roof of stone flags, with a slate roof on the porch. It consists of a nave and a chancel under a continuous roof, a south porch and a west tower. The tower has a single stage, a louvred bell opening on the south side, a raised parapet band, and coped battlements. The porch is gabled and has a round-arched opening. The windows on the sides contain paired lights with pointed cusped heads, and the east window has a pointed head and three lights. Inside, there is a sedilia moved from elsewhere, a tub font, and a barrel-vaulted roof.

== See also ==
- Listed buildings in Bransdale
