= Cockayne, North Yorkshire =

Hamlet in North Yorkshire, England

Coordinates: 54.378°N 1.045°W

Cockayne
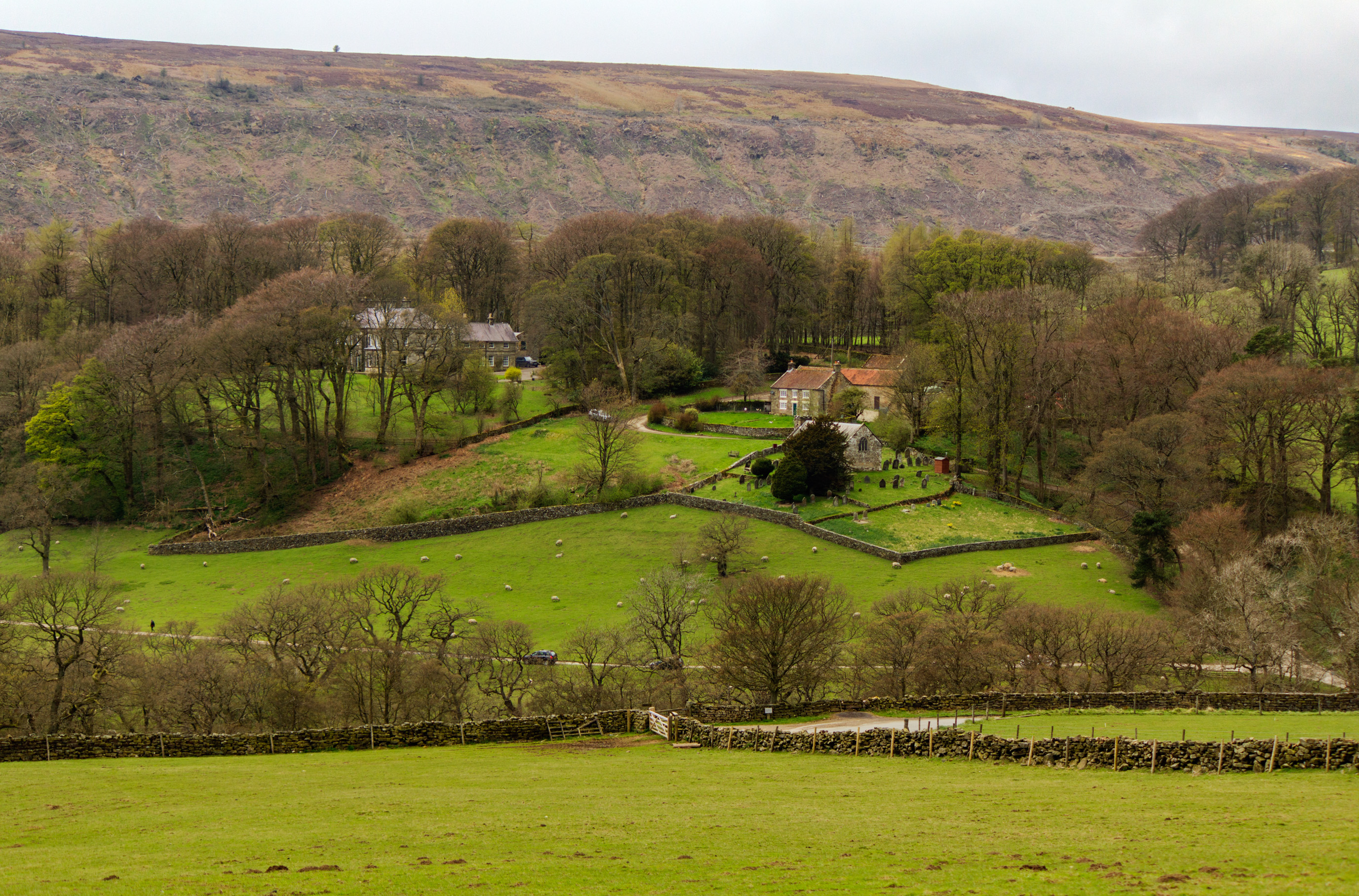
- Cockayne hamlet from Bransdale Road

- Location within North Yorkshire
- OS grid reference: SE620984
- Civil parish: Bransdale
- Unitary authority: North Yorkshire
- Ceremonial county: North Yorkshire
- Region: Yorkshire and the Humber
- Country: England
- Sovereign state: United Kingdom
- Post town: YORK
- Postcode district: YO62
- Dialling code: 01751
- Police: North Yorkshire
- Fire: North Yorkshire
- Ambulance: Yorkshire
- UK Parliament: Thirsk and Malton

Cockayne is an isolated hamlet in North Yorkshire, England. It is the largest settlement in the civil parish of Bransdale, in the North York Moors national park. The nearest towns are Helmsley and Kirkbymoorside, both 10 miles (16 km) away, to the south and south east respectively.

The Cleveland Way long-distance footpath crosses the northern end of Cockayne Ridge, which rises above the hamlet to the north, reaching a summit of 1,447 feet (441 m) at Cockayne Head. The settlement, under the southern tip of the ridge, is a mere 738 feet (225 m) above sea level, according to the Ordnance Survey. Cockayne is at the head of Bransdale, a southward facing valley cut into the moors. The hamlet is the furthest north that can be travelled in the dale by vehicle (apart from a track through the plantation north of the hamlet).

Bransdale Lodge (or Cockayne Lodge) is a house built in the mid 19th century and once used by the Earl of Feversham as a shooting lodge. The small church of St Nicholas, now a grade II listed building, was built about 1800 as a chapel of ease in the ancient parish of Kirkby Moorside.

The hamlet is, with the exception of the Church and Glebe, entirely owned by the National Trust. The overwhelming part of the 1,925 acres (779 ha) Bransdale estate was transferred to the National Trust through National Land Fund procedures in 1972 and comprises all the farmland and a small amount of woodland in the valley.

Studies carried out on the heather moorland at Cockayne Head and Ridge have shown that repairing the moorland after major fires helps prevent flooding in times of heavy rain. When the moorland is burnt the peat dries out and flakes, but when the peat is allowed to grow back, it acts like a natural sponge to retain water and release it slowly over days and weeks, which helps to prevent flooding further downstream.

== See also ==
- Listed buildings in Bransdale

== Gallery ==
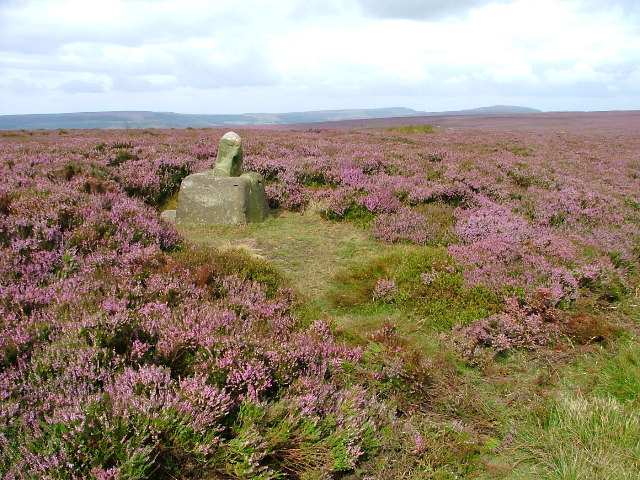
Stump Cross on Slape Wath Moor: heather moors overlook Cockayne

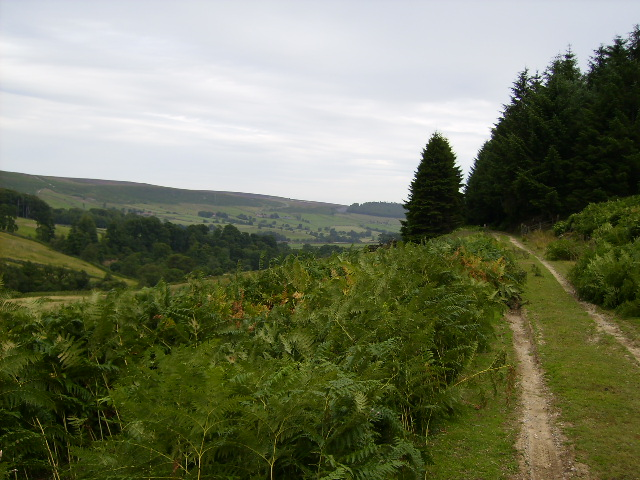
High Plantation: some of the hillsides are dedicated to timber production

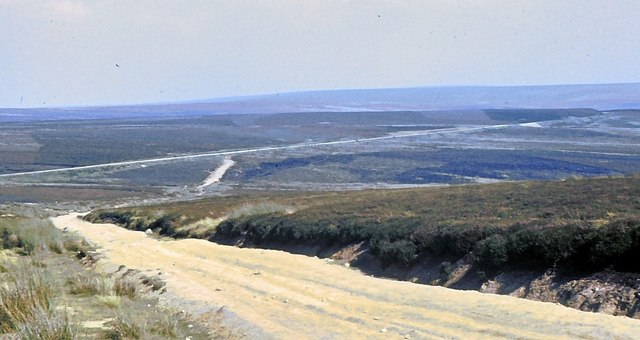
Cleveland Way at Cockayne Head

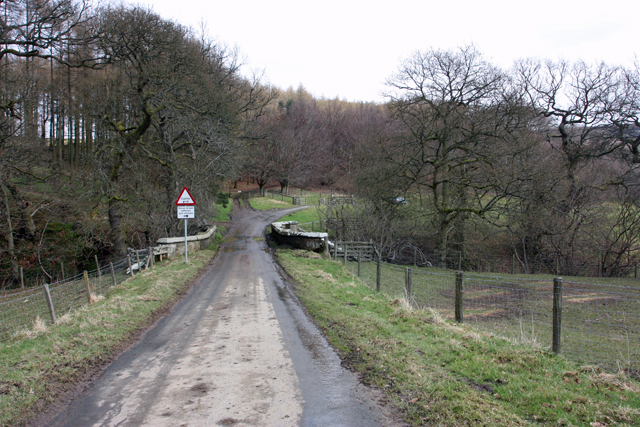
Approach to Cockayne
