= Kirkdale sundial =

Anglo-Saxon sundial in North Yorkshire, England

Coordinates: 54°15′47.15″N 0°57′44.9″W

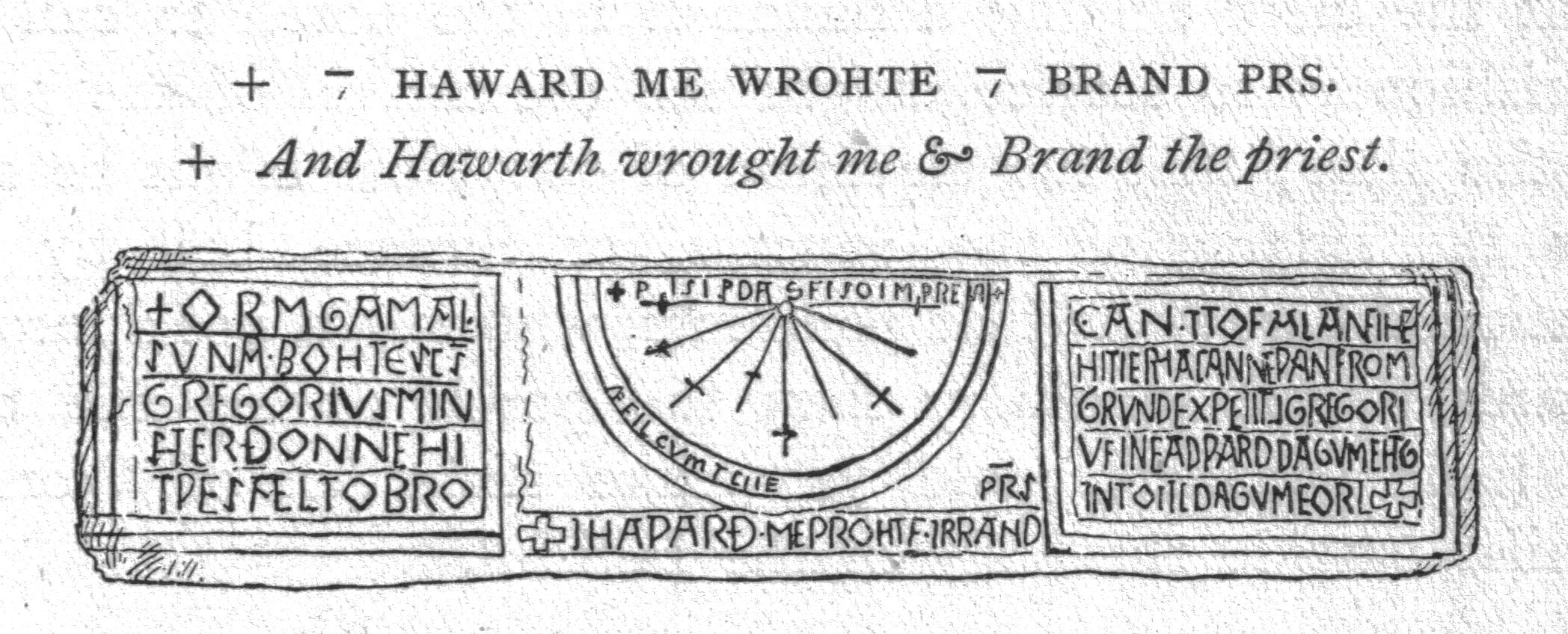
The Tide Sundial at Kirkdale, Yorkshire.

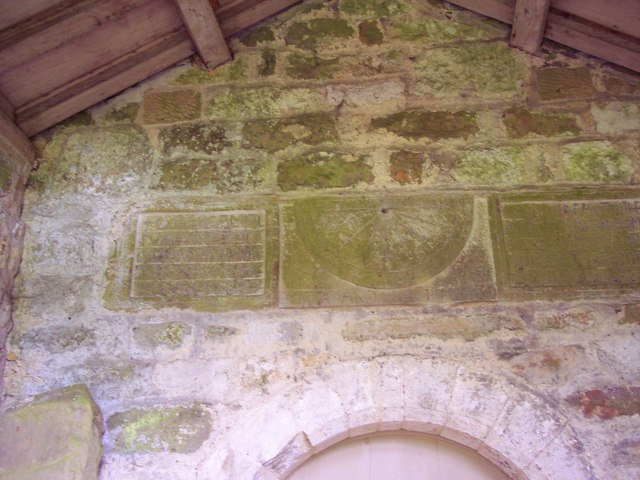
Kirkdale sundial

The ancient canonical sundial at St Gregory's Minster, Kirkdale in North Yorkshire, England, near Kirkbymoorside, dates to the mid 11th century.

The panel containing the actual sundial above the church doors is flanked by two panels, bearing a rare inscription in Old English, the language of the Anglo-Saxons. The sundial, discovered during a renovation in 1771, commemorates the rebuilding of the ruined church, about the year 1055, by Orm, son of Gamal, whose Scandinavian names suggest that he may have been a descendant of Vikings who overran and settled this region in the late 9th century.

== Inscription ==
The inscription on the sundial reads as follows:

+ ORM GAMAL / SVNA BOHTE SCS / GREGORIVS MIN / STER ÐONNE HI / T ǷFS ÆL TOBRO // CAN ⁊ TOFALAN ⁊ HE / HIT LET MACAN NEǷAN FROM / GRVNDE ΧΡE ⁊ SCS GREGORI / VS IN EADǷARD DAGVM CNG / ⁊ [I]N TOSTI DAGVM EORL +
Orm Gamal suna bohte Sanctus Gregorius Minster ðonne hit wæs æl tobrocan and tofalan and he hit let macan newan from grunde Christe and Sanctus Gregorius in Eadward dagum cyning and in Tosti dagum eorl.

(ǷFS may be an error for ǷES, though if the letters were originally painted, as seems quite possible, the E may have appeared intact. The Anglo-Saxon character '⁊' is one of the Tironian notes and stands for the conjunction 'and' (functionally equivalent to the ampersand). Several characters in the Anglo-Saxon alphabet but no longer used in English appear in the inscriptions. Ð/ð (called 'eth')is equivalent to modern 'th', as also is þ (called 'thorn'). Ƿ (called 'wynn') is equivalent to modern 'w'; and Æ/æ (called 'ash') is here equivalent to modern 'a').

"Orm son of Gamal bought St Gregory's Minster when it was all broken down and ruined and he had it made anew from the ground for Christ and St. Gregory in the days of Edward the king and in the days of Tosti the earl."

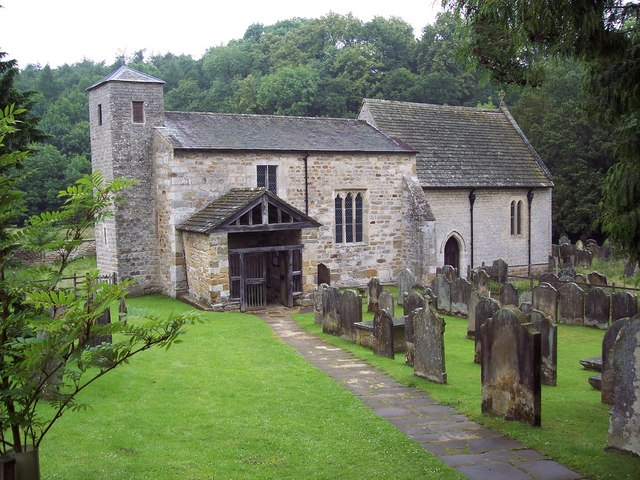
St Gregory's Minster, Kirkdale

The sundial itself is inscribed

+ ÞIS IS DÆGES SOLMERCA + / ÆT ILCVM TIDE
þis is dæges solmerca, æt ilcum tide.
"This is the day's sun-marker, at every tide."

And at the bottom of the central panel is the line

+⁊ HAǷARÐ ME ǷROHTE ⁊ BRAND / PRS
and Hawarð me wrohte and Brand presbyter(i) [or preostas] .
"And Haward wrought me and Brand priest(s)."

The reference is to Edward the Confessor and Tostig, the Earl of Northumbria. Tostig was the son of Earl Godwin of Wessex and the brother of Harold; he was also Edward's brother-in-law. Tostig held the earldom of Northumbria from 1055 to 1065, fixing the date of the church's reconstruction to that decade. In late 1063 or early 1064, Tostig had Gamal, Orm's father. killed when Gamal visited him under safe conduct.

The language of the inscription is late Old English, with a failing case and gender system. The compound solmerca is otherwise unattested in English, and has been ascribed to Scandinavian influence (Old Norse solmerki 'sign of the zodiac').

The Historic England web site, which lists St Gregory's as Grade I, provides the following translation of the full, three-part inscription: "Orm Gamal's son bought St. Gregory's Minster when it was all broken down and fallen and he let it be made anew from the ground to Christ and St. Gregory, in Edward's days, the king, and in Tosti's days, the Earl. This is day's Sun marker at every tide. And Haworth me wrought and Brand, priests." The last two sentences are more fully translated by some sources as: "This is the day’s sun-marking at every hour. And Hawarth made me and Brand priest(s)"

The Journal of the Yorkshire Archaeological and Historical Society. (Volume 69), published in 1997, offers more persuasive interpretations of the final sentence: "First, it makes two statements: that Hawarth made the sundial (that is, he was the craftsman), and that Brand was the priest. The second interpretation is that both Hawarth (who was probably a craftsman and could have been a priest) and Brand the priest (acting as his assistant or instructor), together made the sundial. Higgitt has suggested that 'Brand was perhaps responsible for the drafting and laying out of the text, and perhaps too for the design of the sundial'.27" (The Higgitt referred to is John Higgitt who was a medieval scholar who specialized in analyses of Anglo-Saxon inscriptions. He contributed to a 1997 Medieval Archaeology journal report, Kirkdale - The inscriptions, 41. Vol 41, pp. 51–99.)

Part of the sundial's historical significance is its testimony that, a century and a half after the Viking colonisation of the region, the settlers' descendants such as Orm Gamalson were now using English, not Danish or Norwegian, as the appropriate language for monumental inscriptions.

== Replicas ==
In 2026, the British Museum commissioned a team of artisans from York Minster to create a full-size stone replica of the sundial to be displayed as part of the exhibition accompanying the loan of the Bayeux Tapestry. The sundial was selected to be included in the exhibition due to being one of very few monuments datable to the era of Edward the Confessor, directly before the Norman Conquest.

A plaster cast made between 1935 and 1958 is in the collection of the Science Museum Group.
