= The Old Windmill, Kirkbymoorside =

Windmill in North Yorkshire, England

Coordinates: 54°16′07″N 0°55′56″W

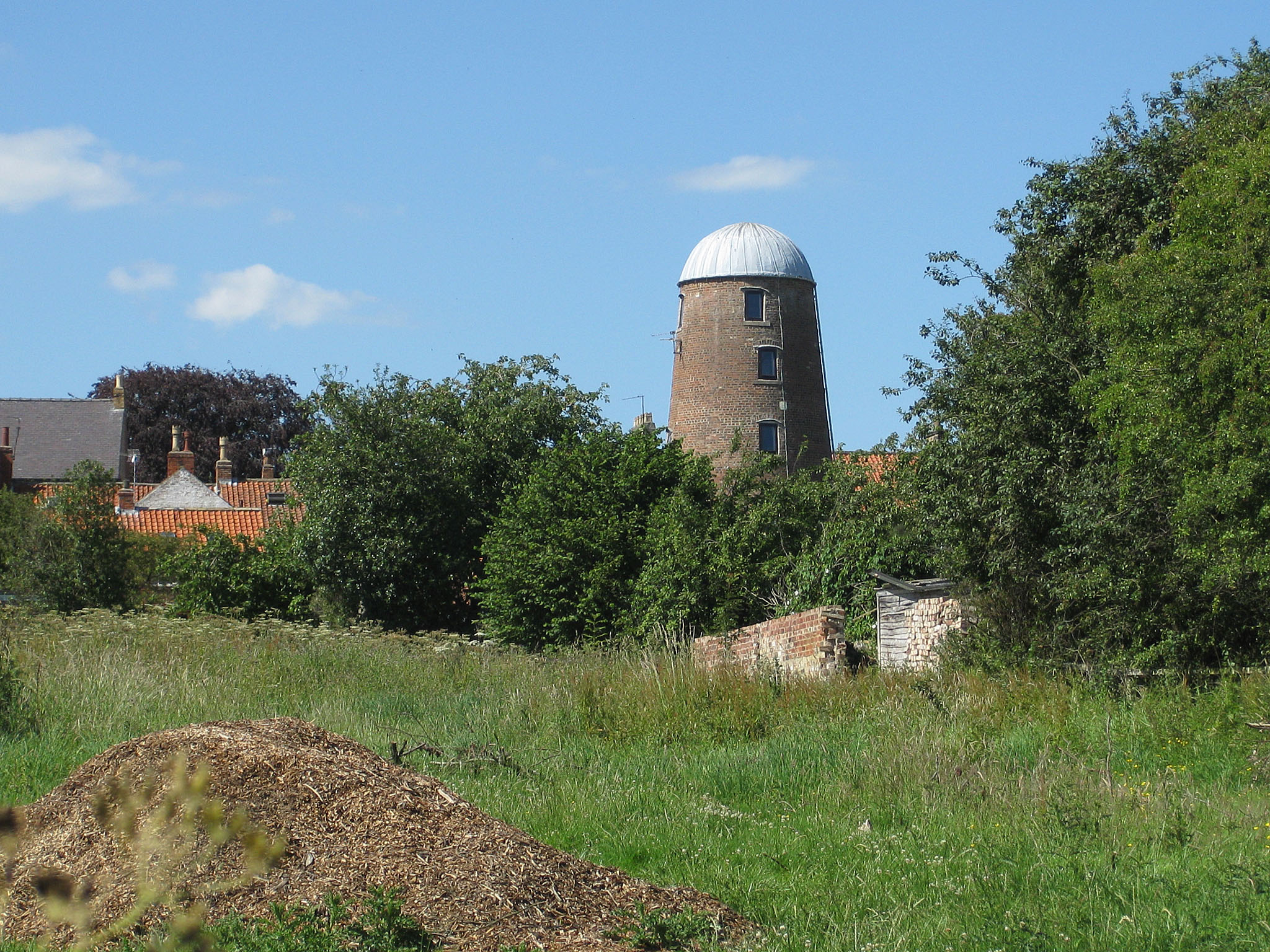
The building, in 2011

The Old Windmill is a historic building in Kirkbymoorside, a town in North Yorkshire, in England.

The windmill was built in 1839, for G. Rivis, at a cost of £1,000. The Rivis family sold it in 1861, and in about 1875, its sails were removed. It was then given a pitched roof and powered by a paraffin engine. Later, it was converted into a house, and it was grade II listed in 1976.

The windmill is built of red brick, it is tapering and has a circular plan. There are five storeys, in each floor are two pivot windows, and in the ground floor are two opposing plank doors. All the openings have cambered brick arches. The ground floor has a diameter of 20 feet (6.1 m), while the top floor has a diameter of 12 feet (3.7 m).

== See also ==
- Listed buildings in Kirkbymoorside
