= Hutton-le-Hole =

Village and civil parish in North Yorkshire, England

Coordinates: 54.301130°N 0.918050°W

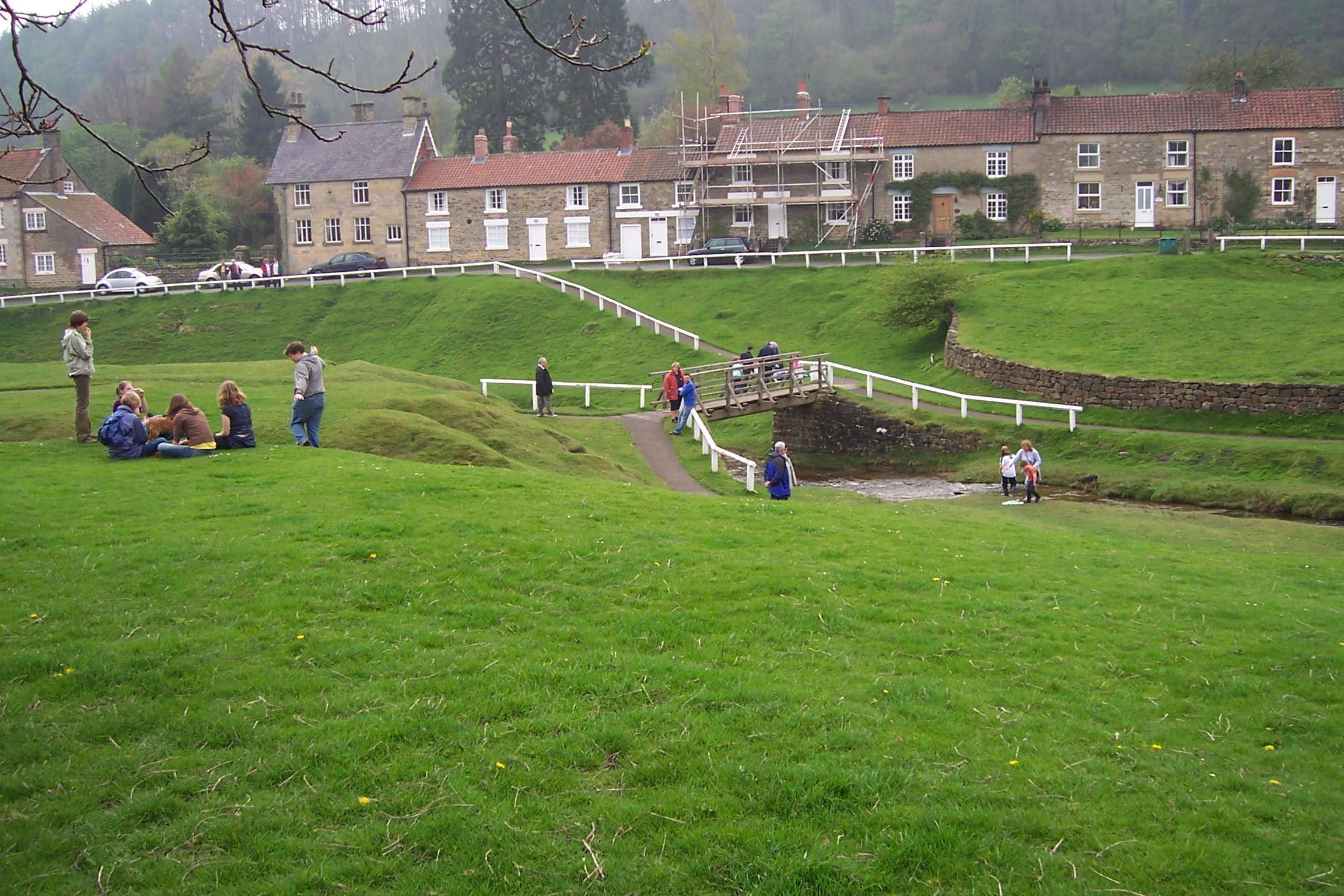
- The village green, Hutton-le-Hole

- Location within North Yorkshire
- Population: 151 (2011 census)
- OS grid reference: SE705900
- Civil parish: Hutton-le-Hole
- Unitary authority: North Yorkshire
- Ceremonial county: North Yorkshire
- Region: Yorkshire and the Humber
- Country: England
- Sovereign state: United Kingdom
- Post town: YORK
- Postcode district: YO62
- Police: North Yorkshire
- Fire: North Yorkshire
- Ambulance: Yorkshire
- UK Parliament: Thirsk and Malton

Hutton-le-Hole is a small village and civil parish in North Yorkshire, England, about 7 miles (11 km) north-west of Pickering. It is a popular scenic village within the North York Moors National Park.

== History ==
The village appears in the Domesday Book of 1086 as Hoton. Since then it has been known as Hege-Hoton, Hoton under Heg and Hewton. The name Hutton-le-Hole means place of the burial ground near the hollow, but the full name appears only in the 19th century.

Near the end of the 13th century, the village was granted to St Mary's Abbey, York.

In the 1600s the village was mainly inhabited by Quakers working as weavers or in agriculture. The Quaker evangelist John Richardson died there in 1753 at the age of 87. About four miles away stands the Kirkbymoorside Quaker Meeting House, built in 1690; it was much modified in 1790 and extended about 1810. It remains a Grade II listed building. John Richardson was buried at the Meeting's burial site. There was a Meeting House in Hutton-le-Hole as well, built in 1698 but turned into a residence in 1859. Interments there continued until 1868.

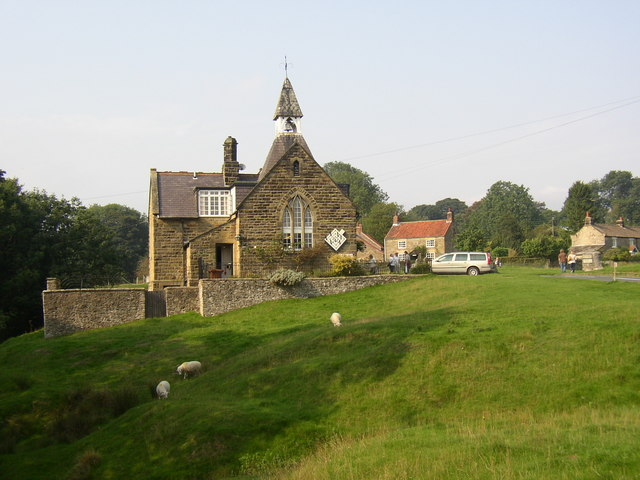
The former school, now a self-catering holiday let (2006 photo)

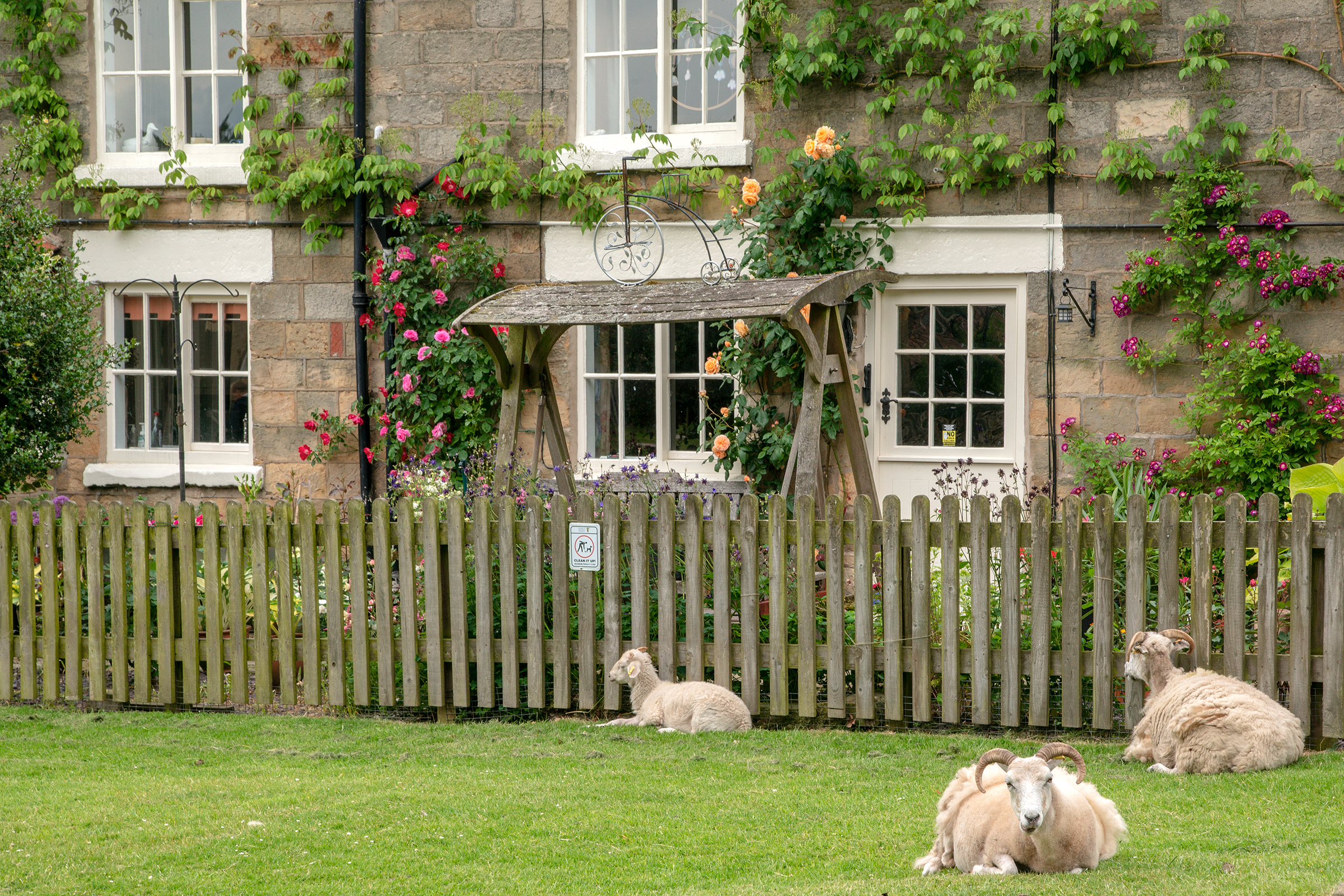
Sheep roam the village and graze wherever they wish

By 1831, Hutton-le-Hole was part of the Anglican Lastingham parish. The "Township of Hutton-le-Hole" was receiving education funding from a charity owned by John Stockton in 1914. The first schoolhouse was built in 1845 and replaced in 1875 by a Grade II listed building, but this is now a holiday let.

In 1901, the old building of the Zion Chapel still stood, but was no longer in use. The village bought it and pulled it down in 1934 when St Chad's Church, Hutton-le-Hole, was built; this still stands and forms part of the Benefice of Lastingham. In earlier years, services had been held in the schoolhouse.

Altogether the village has 29 historical properties listed as Grade II, many of them dating from the 18th century. One is a K6 telephone kiosk designed in 1935, another a sundial installed in 1833.

The world championships in the board game Nine men's morris took place annually at the Ryedale Folk Museum in Hutton-le-Hole until 1997.

From 1974 to 2023 it was part of the district of Ryedale. It is now administered by the unitary North Yorkshire Council.

== Tourism ==
In the Victorian period, gentry saw the village as "ill-planned and untidy" and "overcrowded [with] homes of weavers, smallholders and labourers.... Manure was piled everywhere and the beck was the common sewer."

Hutton-le-Hole now features among the "20 most beautiful villages in the UK and Ireland" according to Condé Nast Traveler and is much visited. It has a large pay-and-display car park at the north end. The National Park Authority recommends visits to the Hutton le Hole Craft Workshops and Ryedale Folk Museum, followed by a two-mile walk to Lastingham and its ancient church, St Mary's.

The museum covers 13 rescued and reconstructed historic buildings, including an Iron Age round house, period shops, thatched cottages, an Elizabethan manor house, barns and workshops, to display the lives of ordinary people up to the present day. There is a cafe, a shop, a gift shop, and in season craft workshops. The folk museum also has the photographic studio of William Hayes, believed to be the oldest daylight photographic studio in England, set up in the early 20th century. The studio was built in 1902 in Monkgate, York, and donated to the museum in 1991.

== Geography ==
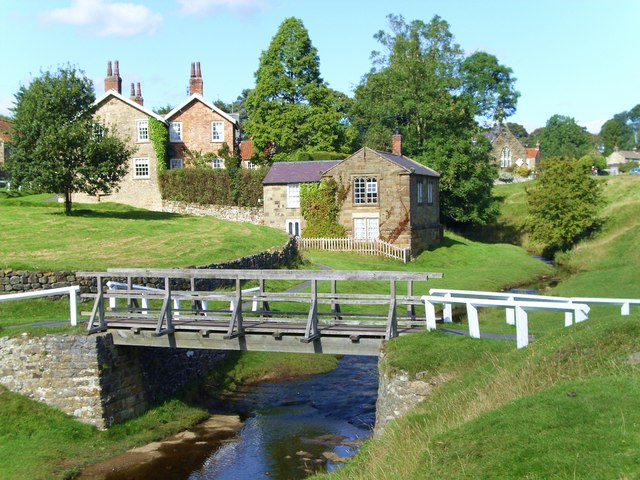
Pedestrian bridge

Hutton-le-Hole lies in Ryedale on the southern edge of the North York Moors, just 2.5 miles (4 km) north of Kirkbymoorside and the A170 road. The hamlet of Lastingham is 1.5 miles (2.4 km) north-east of the village, with the Tabular Hills Walk passing through both places.

The stream Hutton Beck wends its way through the middle of the village, criss-crossed by footpaths and wooden bridges. One of the bridges was replaced in 2002 by the North York Moors National Park Authority when pedestrian traffic across increased dramatically, after the village green was designated as a right of way. The stream splits the village green, whose grass is kept short by sheep. Hutton Beck flows into the River Rye via Catter Beck and the River Seven.

== See also ==
- Listed buildings in Hutton-le-Hole

== Gallery ==
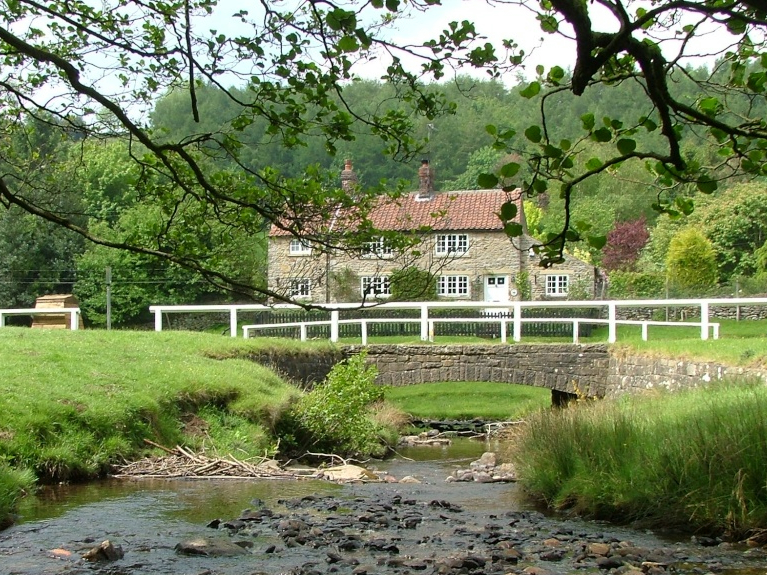
Image along Fairy Call beck

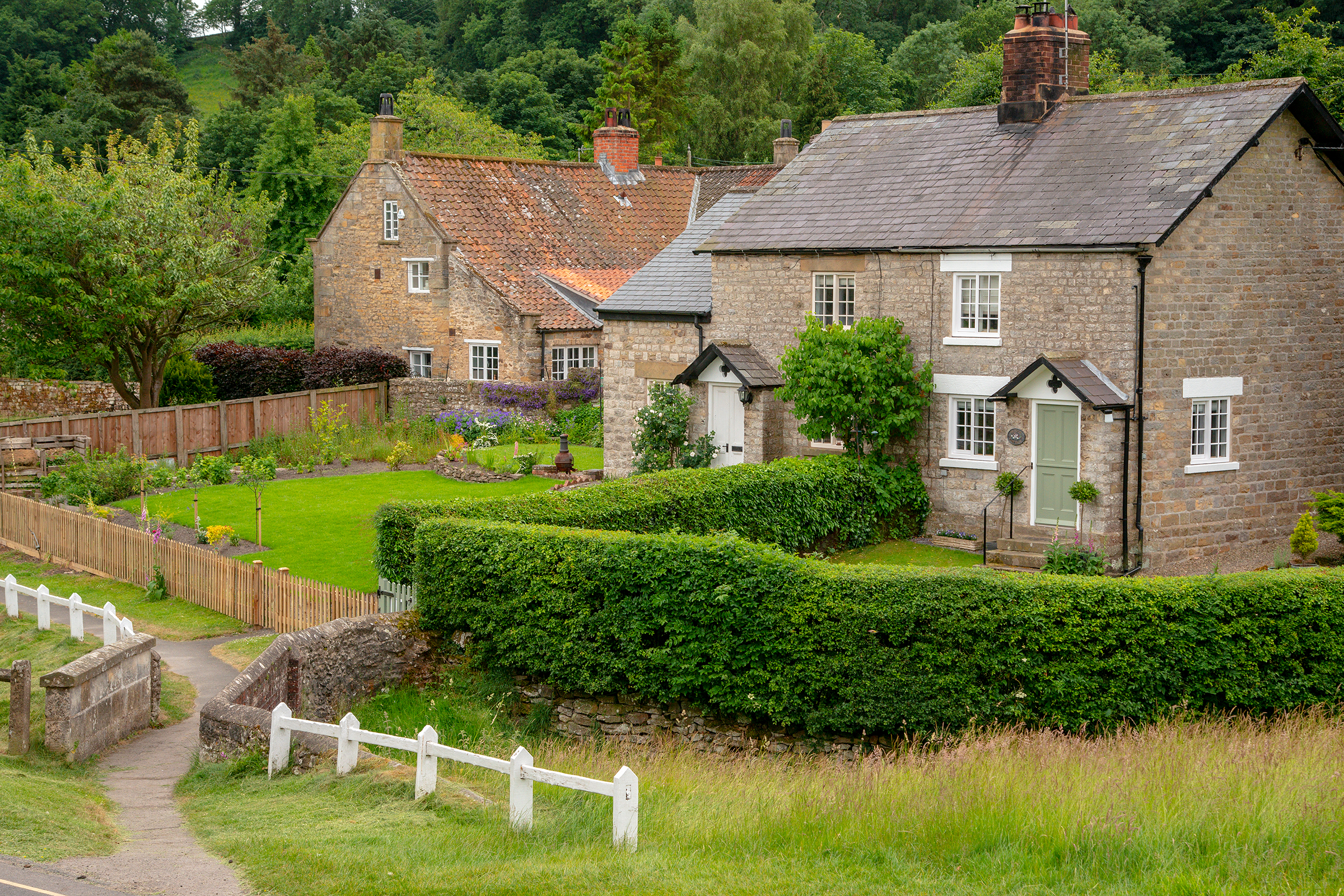
Dwellings on the village green and beck

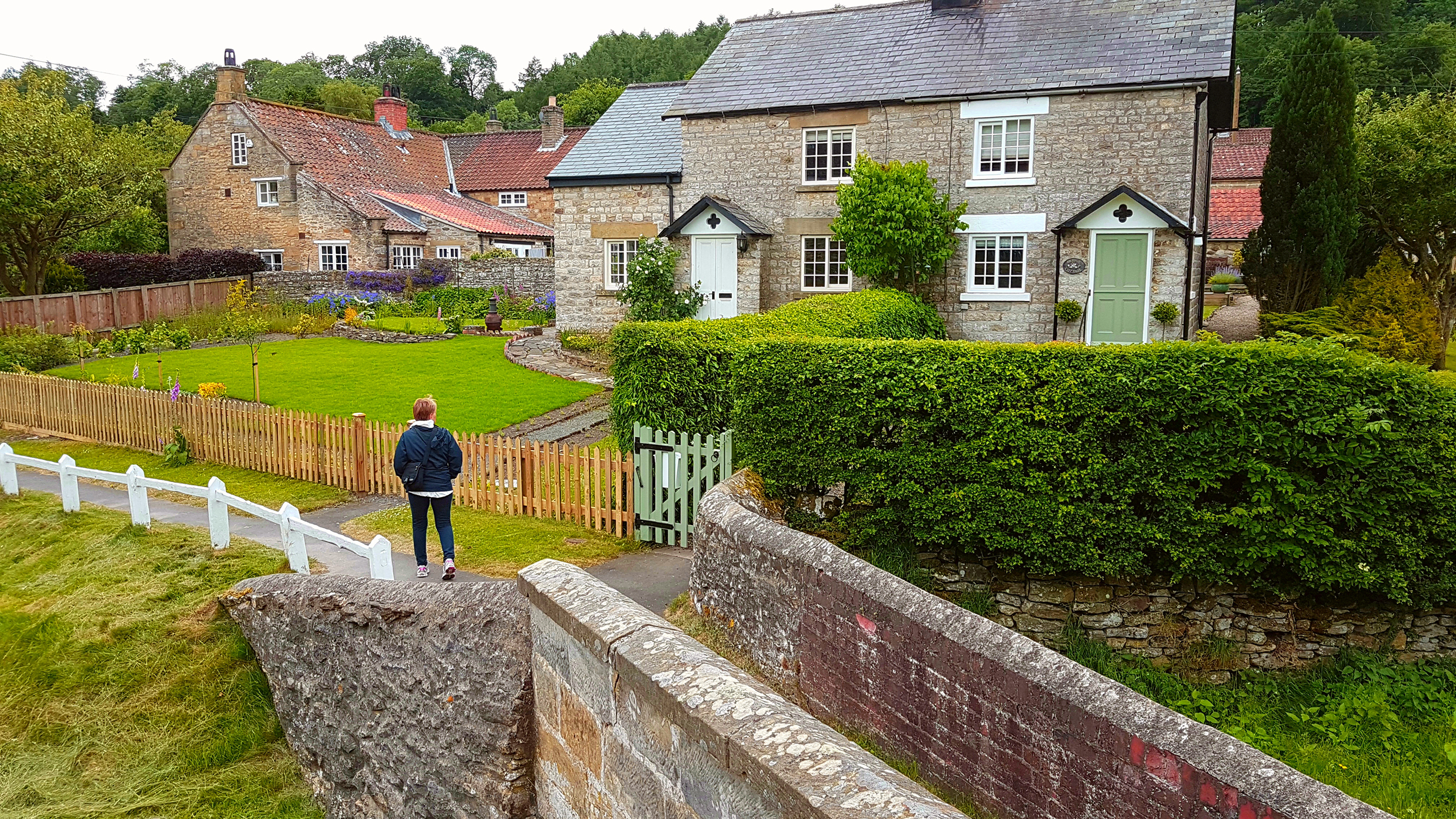
On the village green and beck

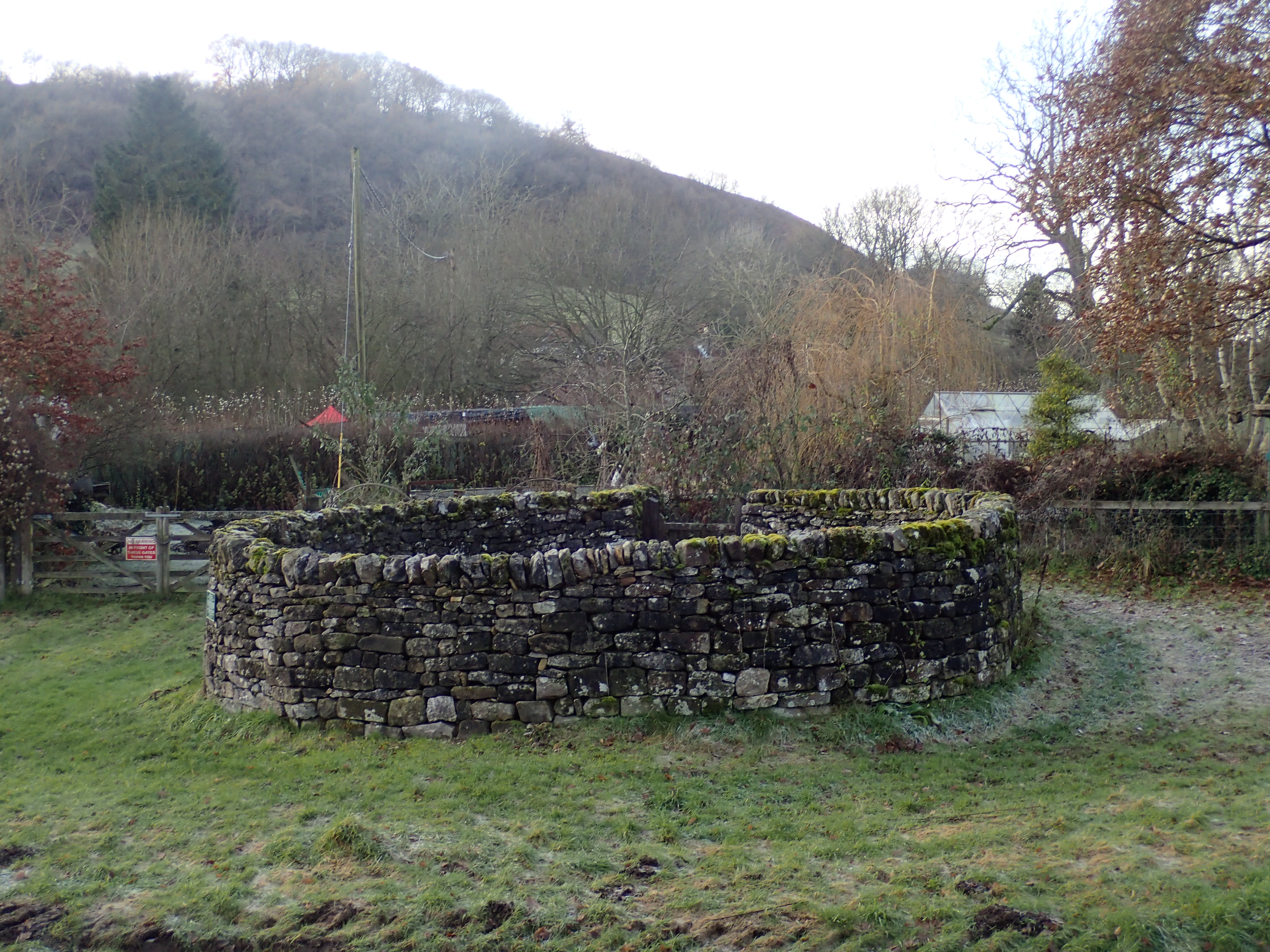
Village pinfold

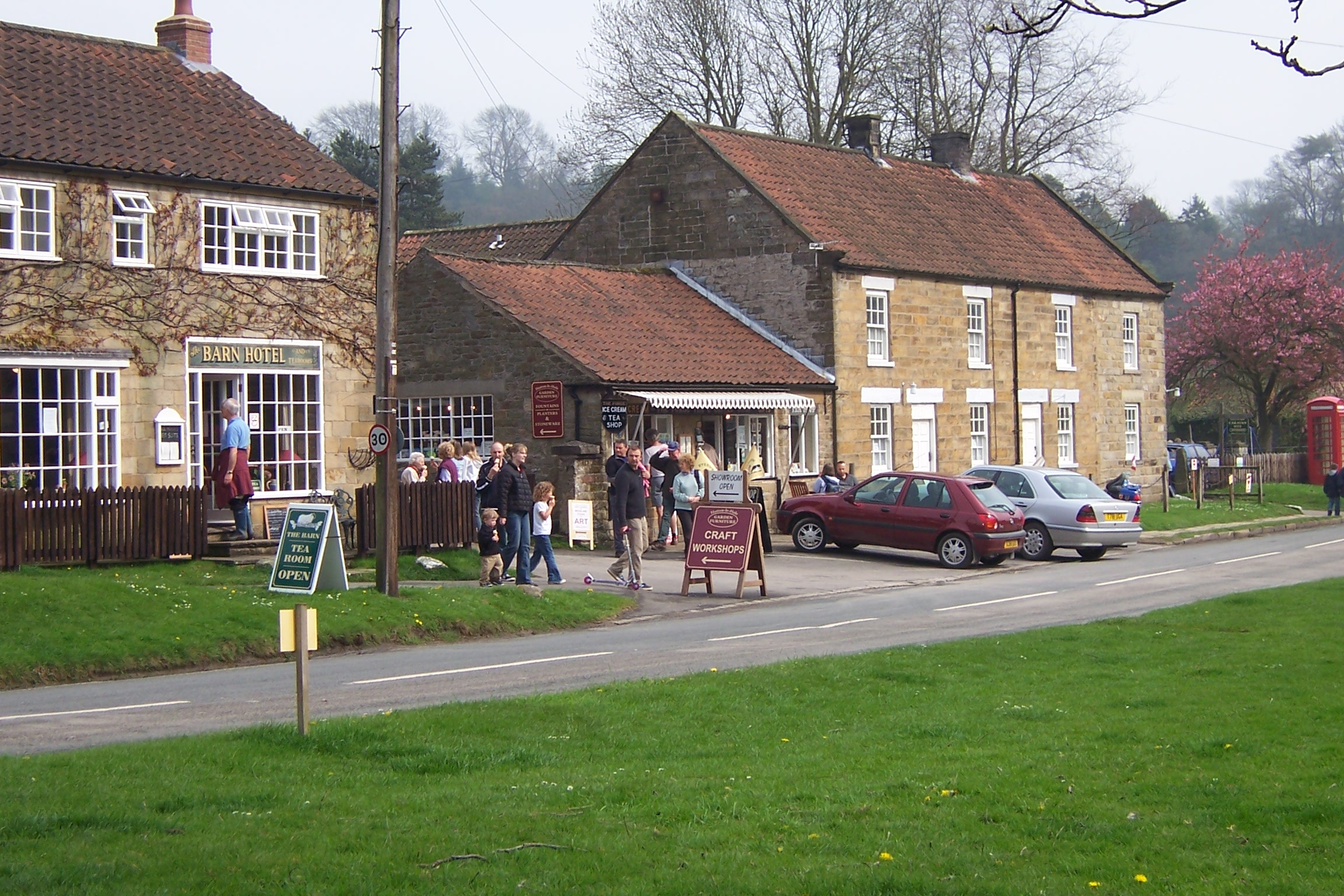
Shops in Hutton-le-Hole

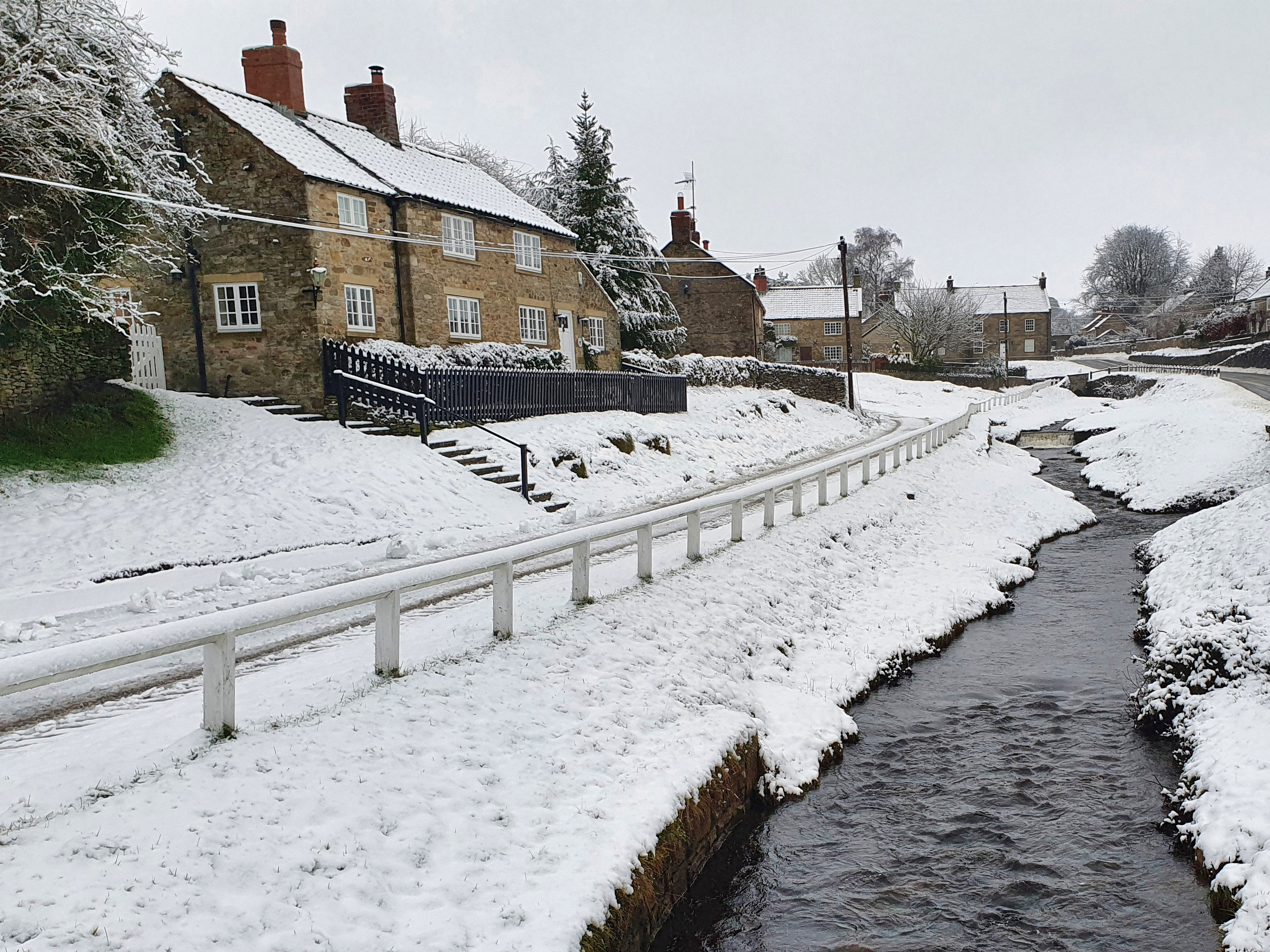
Snow in 2021

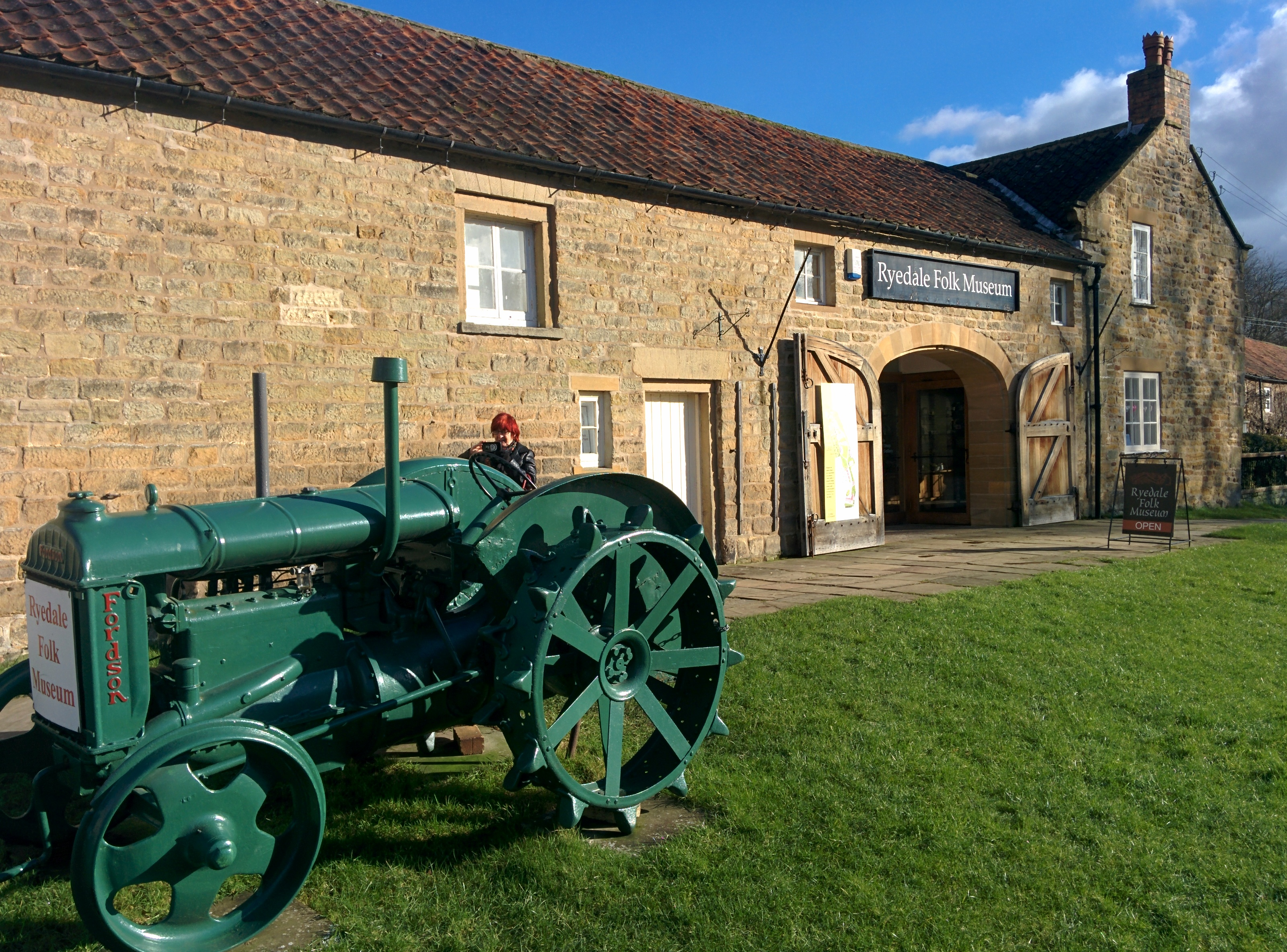
Outside Ryedale Folk Museum

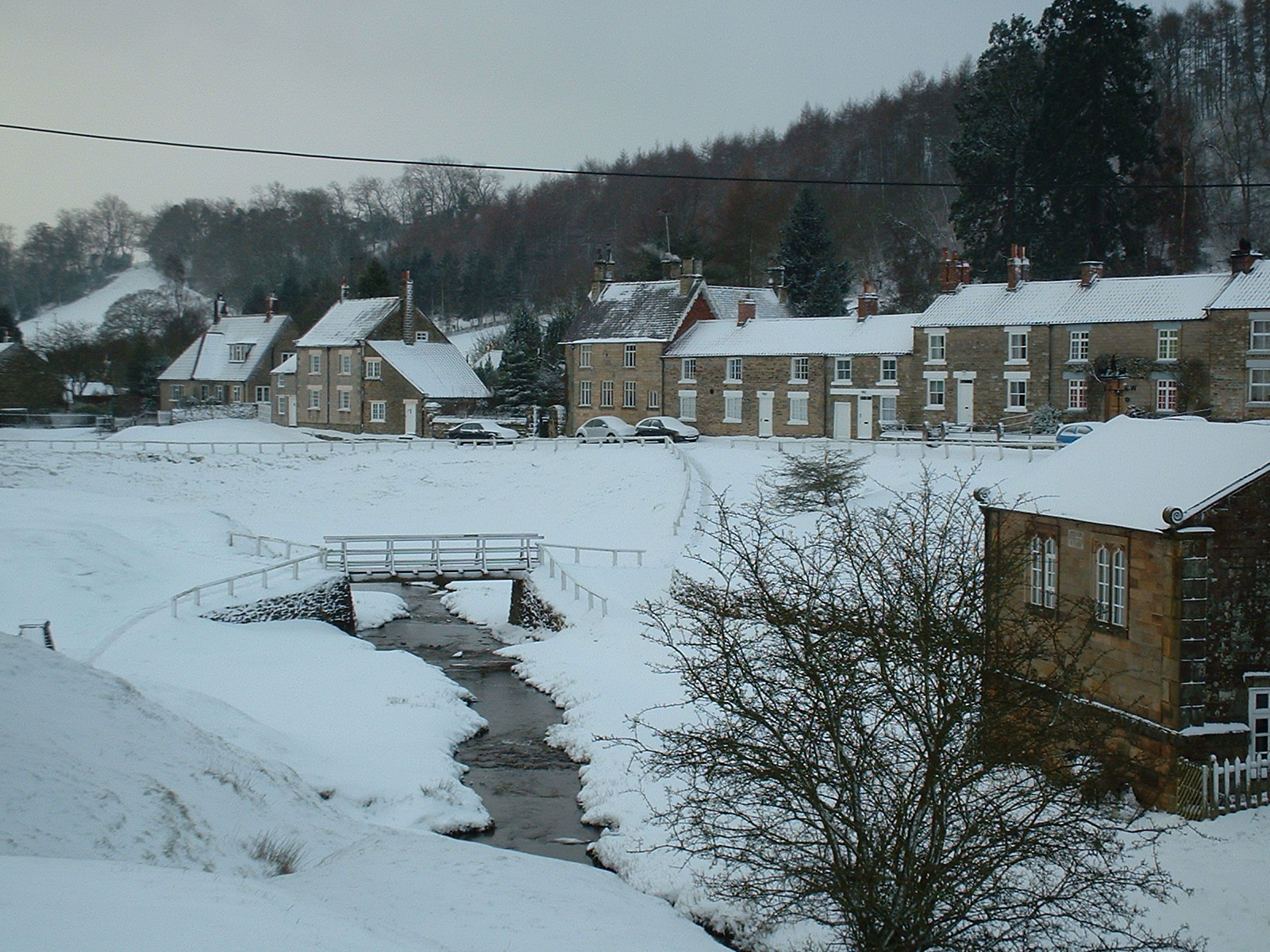
Hutton-le-Hole and Hutton Beck in the snow
