= Listed buildings in Kirkbymoorside =

Kirkbymoorside is a civil parish in the county of North Yorkshire, England. It contains 47 listed buildings that are recorded in the National Heritage List for England. Of these, one is listed at Grade I, the highest of the three grades, and the others are at Grade II, the lowest grade. The parish contains the market town of Kirkbymoorside and the surrounding countryside. Most of the listed buildings are houses, shops and associated structures. The others include a church, a monument in the churchyard, public houses and a hotel, a market cross, a bridge, a range of market stalls, a public hall, a farmhouse, a Friends' meeting house, a windmill and a telephone kiosk.

== Key ==
Grade	Criteria
I	Buildings of exceptional interest, sometimes considered to be internationally important
II	Buildings of national importance and special interest

== Buildings ==
Name and location	Photograph	Date	Notes	Grade
All Saints' Church; 54.27045°N 0.93058°W		13th century	The church has been altered and extended though the centuries, including a restoration and some rebuilding of the east end by George Gilbert Scott in 1873–75. The church is built in limestone and sandstone, with roofs of stone flags. It consists of a nave with a clerestory, north and south aisles, a south porch, a chancel with a north Lady Chapel and a south vestry, and a west tower. The tower has three stages, diagonal buttresses, string courses, glazed oculi, two-light bell openings, a clock face, and an embattled parapet with crocketed pinnacles. There are also embattled parapets on the body of the church. The porch has two storeys, with a room in the upper floor, and a tunnel vault, and the inner doorway has a round-arched head in a segmental arch.	I
High Hall; 54.27201°N 0.93381°W	—	c. 1615	The house has a timber framed core, it is encased in rendered stone and has a pantile roof. There are two storeys, four bays, a right gabled cross wing, and a rear staircase outshut. On the front is a gabled porch that incorporates 17th-century material, including a squint. The windows are sashes, and in the staircase outshut is a Venetian window with the columns removed. The gables have bargeboards, and in the gable of the cross-wing is original exposed timber framing.	II
The Black Swan and shop 54.26959°N 0.93161°W		1632	A group of houses, later converted into a public house and a shop. They have a timber framed core, and are encased in limestone, with extensions in whitewashed brick and stone, quoins, and a pantile roof with coped gables. There are two storeys and four bays. On the front is a projecting two-storey open gabled porch with a dated and inscribed lintel, four carved posts, and an upstairs room with a row of four round-headed windows under bargeboards. To the right is a double shopfront, and the windows are sashes, some horizontally-sliding.	II
12 Crown Square and outbuildings 54.27029°N 0.93165°W		17th century	The house, which has outbuildings at the rear, has a timber framed upper storey encased in sandstone and rendered, and quoins. The right gable wall is in sandstone, and the left gable wall is in pebbledashed brick, its upper storey jettied. There are two storeys and an attic, three bays, and a pantile roof. The ground floor contains shopfronts, and the windows are horizontally-sliding sashes.	II
10 Dale End; 54.27125°N 0.93466°W	—	17th century	The house is in sandstone with a pantile roof. There are two storeys and two bays. The doorway is to the right, and the windows are horizontally-sliding sashes. In the right gable end is a small fire window.	II
Garth End House, Kirkby Klippers, Buckingham House and railings 54.27022°N 0.93239°W		17th century	A house that has been altered, and converted into a shop and two houses. It is in stone with a pantile roof. There is a central range of two storeys and two bays, flanking cross-wings with two storeys, attics, and gables with bargeboards, and three rear wings. In the left bay is a shopfront in brick extending into the left bay of the middle range, and above it are rusticated quoins. In the right bay of the main range is a doorway with pilasters, a fanlight and an open pediment, and to its left is a canted bay window. The other windows are horizontally-sliding sashes. Above the ground floor of the right cross-wing is an inscribed plaque. To the front and side are cast iron rallings with urn finials.	II
Market Cross; 54.27024°N 0.93173°W		17th century (probable)	The market cross is in sandstone with a square plan. It consists of a tall fluted shaft on a flight of steps.	II
14 High Market Place; 54.27089°N 0.93274°W	—	Mid to late 17th century	The house has a cruck framed core. It is encased in sandstone on a rendered plinth, and has a pantile roof. There are two storeys, three bays and a rear outshut. Steps lead to the doorway and the windows are horizontally-sliding sashes. At least one pair of crucks survive.	II
Gate piers and wall, High Hall; 54.27197°N 0.93310°W	—	Late 17th century	The gate piers flanking the entrance to the drive are in rusticated sandstone with a square plan, and they are about 4 metres (13 ft) high. Each pier has a high moulded plinth, a cornice, a stepped pyramidal cap and a ball finial. The attached walls are in sandstone, and are coped.	II
3 West End; 54.26934°N 0.93153°W	—	Early 18th century	The house, with earlier origins, has a cruck framed core, it is encased in rendered sandstone, and has a pantile roof. There are two storeys and two bays. In the ground floor, to the right, is a doorway with a heavy lintel. On the left is a disused doorway with a bow window to its right. The other windows are horizontally-sliding sashes.	II
Cruck Cottage; 54.26531°N 0.92001°W	—	Early 18th century	The house has a cruck framed core, it is encased in limestone, and has a pantile roof. There are two storeys, two bays, and a single-storey single-bay extension on the right. The doorway is in the extension, and the windows are horizontally-sliding sashes. In the left gable end is a fire window.	II
Keldholme Bridge; 54.26766°N 0.91384°W		Early 18th century	The bridge carries a road over the River Dove. It is in sandstone, and consists of a single round arch. The bridge has moulded voussoirs, a chamfered band and a chamfered parapet.	II
83 West End; 54.26846°N 0.93559°W		Early to mid 18th century	The house, with earlier origins, has a cruck framed core, it is encased in sandstone, and has a pantile roof. There are two storeys and two bays. The doorway is in the centre, and the windows are horizontally-sliding sashes. To the left is a blocked fire window. Inside, one pair of crucks has survived.	II
16 and 18 High Market Place; 54.27101°N 0.93287°W	—	18th century	A pair of houses in sandstone, rendered on the front, with a pantile roof. There are two storeys and three bays. Steps lead up to a doorway with a rectangular fanlight, most of the windows are horizontally-sliding sashes, and in the gable ends are fire windows.	II
14 Market Place; 54.26988°N 0.93134°W		Mid 18th century	A house and a shop with the gable end facing the street, the street front is in painted brick, and elsewhere it is in sandstone. It has raised quoins, moulded string courses, and a pantile roof with a coped gable and a shaped kneeler. There are two storeys and an attic, and one bay. In the ground floor is a shopfront, with a doorway to the left of a bay window with a moulded glazing bar and a heavy cornice, Above are sashes in architraves.	II
28 Piercy End; 54.26834°N 0.93091°W	—	Mid 18th century	The house is in sandstone with a pantile roof over thatch. There are two storeys and two bays. The central doorway has a rectangular fanlight, and the windows are horizontally-sliding sashes.	II
8 West End; 54.26937°N 0.93178°W	—	Mid 18th century	The house is in limestone on a plinth, with raised quoins, a floor band, a coved eaves course, and a pantile roof with a coped gable and shaped kneelers on the left. There are two storeys and one bay. The doorway is on the right, the windows are sashes, and all the openings have raised surrounds and keystones.	II
Dog and Duck; 54.27067°N 0.93247°W	—	18th century	A farmhouse in sandstone with a pantile roof and gable coping. There are two storeys and four bays, and a rear outshut. On the front are two doorways, and the windows have squared architraves, splayed reveals and chamfered mullions.	II
Kings Head Hotel; 54.27033°N 0.93251°W		Mid 18th century	The hotel is in sandstone on a plinth, with a floor band, a moulded eaves cornice, and a pantile roof with coped gables and moulded kneelers. There are two storeys, four bays, and a rear wing. The doorway in the third bay has a segmental arch with voussoirs, quoined jambs, and a fanlight. In the left bay is a canted bay window, and the other windows are sashes.	II
National Westminster Bank; 54.26978°N 0.93132°W		18th century	A house, later a bank, in red brick on a plinth at the front, the side walls rendered, and in stone at the rear, with quoins, and a pantile roof with coped gables and shaped kneelers. There are two storeys and four bays. In the right bay is a doorway with a sandstone surround and a carved lintel. In the other ground floor bays and in the right return are canted bay windows, and the other windows are sashes.	II
Piercy House; 54.26816°N 0.93091°W	—	Mid 18th century	A house, with an outbuilding to the left converted into a cottage, in sandstone on a plinth, with quoins, a moulded eaves course, and a pantile roof with coped gables and shaped kneelers. The house has two storeys, and three bays, a central doorway with a rectangular fanlight, and sash windows. The cottage is lower, with two storeys and one bay. It contains a doorway and horizontally-sliding sash windows.	II
Range of market stalls 54.27036°N 0.93179°W	—	18th century	The three market stalls, later converted for other uses, are in sandstone, with timber framed openings, brick interior walls, and a pantile roof. There is a single storey, and each stall had a ledge and a stable door to the left of an open shop window.	II
The George and Dragon Inn, railings and bank 54.26982°N 0.93190°W		Mid 18th century	The public house is in stone, whitewashed on the front, with chamfered quoins, basement and floor bands, a moulded eaves cornice, and a pantile roof. There are two storeys and a semi-basement, and three bays. In the left bay is an elliptical carriage arch with voussoirs, and quoined jambs with imposts. Steps lead to the doorway that has a divided rectangular fanlight, and a flat hood on wrought iron brackets. The windows are horizontally-sliding sashes with double keystones. In front are iron railings on a chamfered stone base, with urn finials and spiral tips.	II
The Georgian House and railings 54.26919°N 0.93282°W		Mid 18th century	The house, later used for other purposes, is in sandstone at the front, with brick elsewhere, and has quoins, floor bands, a moulded eaves cornice, and a slate roof. There are three storeys, three bays and a rear extension. The central doorway has pilasters, a rectangular fanlight, and a pediment. It is flanked by canted bay windows with modillion cornices, and the other windows are sashes. At the right of the middle floor is a circular sundial with an initialled filigree gnomon. Along the front are decorated iron railings.	II
The White Swan Inn; 54.26970°N 0.93088°W		Mid 18th century	The public house is in painted rendered brick on the front, with stone at the rear, a cogged eaves course, and a pantile roof. There are two storeys, two bays, and a rear extension. The doorway is in the centre, and the windows date from the 20th century.	II
Tolbooth; 54.27029°N 0.93194°W		Mid 18th century	The hall is in sandstone, with four giant rusticated pilasters on the front. floor bands, and a slate roof. There are two storeys, attics and a basement, and five bays. Steps lead up to the central doorway that has a segmental head and a fanlight. The windows are sashes, those in the upper floor with wedge lintels. On the roof is a square turret with oval louvres in the sides, and a pagoda top. In the left gable wall is a doorway with an oriel window above.	II
8 Market Place and railings 54.26938°N 0.93071°W		Mid to late 18th century	The house, later used for other purposes, is in sandstone at the front and brick at the rear, with raised quoins, floor bands, a moulded eaves course, and a coped slate roof. There are three storeys and a basement, three bays, and a rear extension. In the centre, steps lead up to a doorway with a rectangular fanlight. This is flanked by bow windows with fluted pilasters and an acorn drop frieze, and the other windows are sashes. In front are cast iron railings, ramped up to the doorway.	II
47 and 49 Piercy End; 54.26805°N 0.93058°W	—	Mid to late 18th century	A house with an outbuilding to the right, later a house and a shop, in sandstone, the right gable wall rendered, and with a pantile roof. There are two storeys and three bays. The house has a central doorway flanked by horizontally-sliding sash windows. The shop has a doorway, and a shop window with panelled pilasters, a cornice, and shaped colonnettes between the two lights. The windows in the upper floor are horizontally-sliding sashes.	II
Low Park Farmhouse; 54.27997°N 0.92900°W		Mid to late 18th century	The farmhouse is in limestone, and has a pantile roof with coped gables and shaped kneelers. There are two storeys, a high end with two bays, and a two-bay low end to the right. The doorway has a divided fanlight, the windows are horizontally-sliding sashes, and at the rear is a round-headed stair window with voussoirs and a keystone.	II
The Green; 54.27000°N 0.93021°W	—	Mid to late 18th century	A house, with a stable block to the left incorporated into the house, in limestone, with sandstone quoins, on a plinth, with a pantile roof. There are two storeys and four bays. Steps lead to the doorway that has pilasters, a rectangular fanlight, and flat hood. In the left bay is a carriage entrance converted into a garage doorway. In the ground floor are three canted bay windows, and the other windows are sashes.	II
Vivers Lodge; 54.26901°N 0.92864°W	—	Mid to late 18th century	The house is in orange-red brick on the front, and sandstone elsewhere, with stone dressings, raised quoins, floor bands, a moulded eaves cornice, and a pantile roof with coped gables. There are three storeys, three bays, and a rear extension. In the centre is a two-storey porch containing a doorway with a fanlight, above which is a glazed iron bay window. In the upper floor are sash windows in architraves. At the rear is the re-set original doorway that has fluted pilasters, a patterned fanlight, an entablature and a cornice.	II
17 and 19 Piercy End; 54.26869°N 0.93045°W		Late 18th century	Originally the entrance to a gas works, later used for other purposes. In the ground floor are cast iron shopfronts, the upper floor is in orange-red brick at the front, with quoins, the rear is in stone, and there is a pantile roof. There are two storeys and three bays. The central bay contains a carriage arch, and in the outer bays are shopfronts, each with moulded pilasters, and decorated consoles carrying an elliptical-arched panel above a frieze. The shop windows are divided by a slender colonnette. Above the ground floor are inscribed cast iron panels, and the upper floor contains sash windows.	II
18 and 20 West End; 54.26920°N 0.93258°W	—	Late 18th century	A pair of houses in painted brick on a plinth on the front, elsewhere in stone, with raised quoins, a floor band, a moulded eaves course, and a pantile roof with coped gables, and shaped kneelers. There are two storeys and four bays. The doorway to the right house has pilasters and a rectangular fanlight, to its left is a canted bay window, and further to the left is the doorway to the other house, with a fanlight, a keystone and a gauged brick arch. The windows are sashes with keystones and gauged brick arches.	II
The Petch House, steps and wall 54.26930°N 0.92909°W	—	1785	The house, later extended and divided into two, is in orange-red brick on a stone plinth, rendered at the rear, and with sandstone on the sides and extension. It has stone dressings, raised quoins, floor bands, a moulded eaves cornice, and a swept hipped pantile roof. There are three storeys and three bays. The central doorway, now blocked and a window inserted, has engaged Doric columns and a pediment, and the windows are sashes. At the rear is a central Ionic doorway with part-fluted engaged columns, a pulvinated frieze and an open pediment. To the right are two-storey pointed staircase windows, and a three-storey canted bay window. To the right of the house are stone steps, and a ramped up brick wall with stone coping and a pier.	II
Friends' Meeting House; 54.26843°N 0.93527°W	—	1791	The meeting house is in sandstone, with a porch in orange brick and a hipped slate roof. It has a rectangular plan, with two cells and a west porch. The porch has a round-arched entrance, and the windows are sashes; the window in the right return is tripartite.	II
Low Hall, wall and outbuilding 54.27149°N 0.93387°W		1797	The house is in stone, rendered on the sides and rear, with bands at basement and eaves levels, a parapet, and a hipped concrete slab roof. There are two storeys, a basement and an attic, and five bays. Cantilevered steps with iron railings lead up to the central doorway that has a fanlight with Gothick glazing, and an open pediment on Tuscan columns. The windows are sashes, and in the attic is a flat-topped dormer. Attached to the house is an undulating sandstone wall with cambered coping.	II
5 Church Street and railings 54.26989°N 0.93106°W		Late 18th to early 19th century	The house is in orange-red brick with a moulded timber eaves cornice and a slate roof. There are three storeys and a basement, and two bays. In the right bay, steps lead up to a recessed doorway with panelled reveals, a fanlight with radial glazing, and an open pediment on brackets, and above are sash windows with gauged brick arches. The left bay contains a three-storey canted bay window. In front of the house are cast iron railings, ramped up on the entrance steps.	II
Tontine House and carriage arch 54.26953°N 0.93080°W		1823	A posthouse, later a house and shop with an arch to the right. The house and shop are in painted brick on the front, and in stone elsewhere, with a slate roof at the front and pantile at the rear, with coped gables and moulded kneelers. There are two storeys and four bays. Steps lead to the doorway in the third bay, with panelled pilasters, a fanlight, and a dentilled cornice on scrolled consoles. In the left bay is a shopfront with panelled pilasters and a dentilled cornice. In the other bays are canted bay windows, and the upper floor contains sash windows with wedge lintels. To the right is a carriage entrance with a rusticated elliptical arch, and a sash window above.	II
11 Crown Square; 54.27028°N 0.93137°W	—	Early 19th century	An inn, later a private house, in orange-red brick on a stone plinth, rendered at the rear, with sandstone dressings, raised quoins, and a pantile roof with a coped gable and shaped kneelers on the right. There are two storeys, three bays, and a rear outshut. The central doorway has a rectangular fanlight, and the windows are sashes.	II
12–20 Dale End; 54.27130°N 0.93489°W	—	Early 19th century	A terrace of five houses in limestone with a pantile roof. There are three storeys and five bays. Each house has a doorway, and the windows are horizontally-sliding sashes, those in the lower two floors with stone lintels, and in the top floor with timber lintels.	II
2 West End; 54.26944°N 0.93156°W		Early 19th century	A shop with living accommodation above, in limestone with a pantile roof. There are two storeys and an attic, and two bays. On the ground floor is a doorway on the left with a fanlight, and to the right is a shallow bow window. The upper floors contain sash windows, and in the attic are two dormers.	II
Prospect House; 54.26908°N 0.93039°W		Early 19th century	Shops and living accommodation on a corner site, in sandstone with a pantile roof. There are three storeys and four bays, the third bay curved on the corner. In the curved bay is a doorway with a rectangular divided fanlight. Flanking the doorway are shop windows with pilaster and cornices. The windows are sashes; those above the doorway are curved.	II
The Cottage; 54.26717°N 0.91272°W		Early 19th century	The house is in limestone with a pantile roof. There are two storeys and two bays, and a single-story outbuilding on the left. The central doorway has a rectangular fanlight, the windows are sashes, and all the openings have heavy lintels.	II
The White Horse Inn; 54.26937°N 0.93126°W		Early 19th century	The public house, rendered on the front and in sandstone at the rear, has quoins, a moulded eaves cornice and a hipped slate roof. There are two storeys, five bays and a rear wing. The central doorway has channelled pilasters and a grooved bracketed cornice. To its left are two bow windows, and the other windows are sashes in architraves. In the left return is an arched entrance with voussoirs and quoins, a canted bay window and a fire window.	II
Windmill; 54.26845°N 0.93279°W		1839	The windmill, behind 17 West End, is in red brick, it is tapering and has a circular plan. There are five storeys, in each floor are two pivot windows, and in the ground floor are two opposing plank doors. All the openings have cambered brick arches.	II
Monument in churchyard 54.27024°N 0.93070°W		Mid 19th century	The monument is in the churchyard of All Saints' Church, to the south of the porch. It is in sandstone, and consists of a chest tomb with a pitched and gabled roof on a stepped plinth. On the sides are quatrefoils with foliate crosses, above is a band of nailhead moulding, and on the corners are vertical bands. An inscription runs round the tomb, and in the gable ends are recessed trefoil-headed arches on colonnettes.	II
Telephone kiosk 54.27006°N 0.93208°W	—	1935	The K6 type telephone kiosk was designed by Giles Gilbert Scott. Constructed in cast iron with a square plan and a dome, it has three unperforated crowns in the top panels.	II
