= The Black Swan, Kirkbymoorside =

Pub in North Yorkshire, England

Coordinates: 54.2696°N 0.9316°W

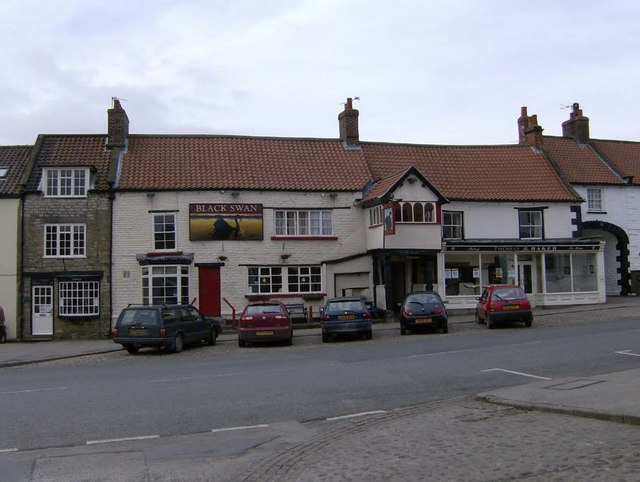
The pub, in 2007

The Black Swan is a historic pub in Kirkbymoorside, a town in North Yorkshire, in England.

The building lies on the western side of the marketplace. It was originally constructed in 1632, as a hall house with a through passage, with the hall in the front section, and kitchens in the rear wing. It was later extended to the left, right and rear. It served as a coaching inn in the early 19th century, and as a pub for many years, although the right-hand section was divided later in the century to become a shop. It served as an Indian restaurant in the early 2010s before again becoming a pub. The building was grade II listed in 1955.

The building has a timber framed core, encased in limestone, with extensions in whitewashed brick and stone, quoins, and a pantile roof with coped gables. It has two storeys and is four bays wide. On the front is a projecting two-storey open gabled porch with a dated and inscribed lintel, four carved posts, and an upstairs room with a row of four round-headed windows under bargeboards. To the right is a double shopfront, and the windows are sashes, some horizontally-sliding. In the bar, there is an early fireplace with a built-in spice cupboard. The original king post roof also survives.

== See also ==
- Listed buildings in Kirkbymoorside
