= Listed buildings in Hutton-le-Hole =

Hutton-le-Hole is a civil parish in the county of North Yorkshire, England. It contains 29 listed buildings that are recorded in the National Heritage List for England. All the listed buildings are designated at Grade II, the lowest of the three grades, which is applied to "buildings of national importance and special interest". The parish contains the village of Hutton-le-Hole, and the surrounding countryside and moorland. The listed buildings include houses, cottages and associated structures, six boundary stones, and a telephone kiosk.

== Buildings ==
Name and location	Photograph	Date	Notes
Pound; 54.30255°N 0.91826°W		Late 17th century (probable)	The animal pound is in limestone. It has a circular plan with walls between about 1.75 metres (5 ft 9 in) and 2 metres (6 ft 7 in) high, with vertically set coping stones. The gate is on the west.
Boundary stone 54.33138°N 0.93363°W		Early 18th century (probable)	The boundary stone consists of a sandstone monolith about 1.4 metres (4 ft 7 in) high. It is inscribed with the initials "T D".
Catter Rook Stone; 54.34339°N 0.93508°W		Early 18th century	The boundary stone is in gritstone. It is rectangular, about0.9 metres (2 ft 11 in) high, and on the top are carved the initials "T D". Adjacent is a taller unmarked stone, probably older, about 1.4 metres (4 ft 7 in) high.
Catter Stone; 54.34102°N 0.93526°W		Early 18th century	The boundary stone is in gritstone, and is a roughly shaped monolith about 0.85 metres (2 ft 9 in) high. The west face is inscribed with the initials "T D" and a benchmark. A second, taller stone is propped against it.
Hangman Stone; 54.31656°N 0.93449°W		Early 18th century (probable)	The boundary stone is in sandstone, and is a roughly shaped monolith about 1.25 metres (4 ft 1 in) high. The west face is inscribed with the initials "T D".
Pricket Thorn Stone; 54.32781°N 0.93371°W		Early 18th century (probable)	The boundary stone is in sandstone, and consists of a pointed monolith about 1.5 metres (4 ft 11 in) high. The west face is inscribed with the initials "T D".
Thorn Stone; 54.32388°N 0.93383°W		Early 18th century (probable)	The boundary stone is in sandstone, and consists of a roughly shaped monolith about 1.5 metres (4 ft 11 in) high. The west face is inscribed with the initials "T D".
Ford Cottage; 54.29868°N 0.91697°W	—	18th century	A house with a workshop incorporated, in sandstone, with quoins, and a pantile roof with coped gables and shaped kneelers. There are two storeys, four bays, and extensions to the left and rear. On the front is a doorway, and the windows are horizontally-sliding sashes.
Moorgarth and Dickens Cottage; 54.30175°N 0.91796°W		Mid 18th century	Two houses in sandstone, with quoins, stepped eaves courses, and pantile roofs with coped gables and shaped kneelers. There are two storeys, the main block has two bays, to the right is a lower three-bay range, and to the left is a single-bay extension. On the front are two doorways and a gabled porch. The windows are sashes.
Douthwaite; 54.30226°N 0.93564°W	—	1760	A country house, with the rear wing added in 1814. It is in sandstone on a plinth, with chamfered quoins, a floor band, a moulded eaves cornice, and an M-shaped stone slate roof with coped gables and shaped kneelers. There are two storeys and an attic, a double depth plan, three bays, and an L-shaped rear wing. In the centre is a doorway with a pediment, and the windows on the front have triple keystones. The wing has two bays and three bays at right angles. It contains sash windows, and two canted bay windows, one with two storeys.
Wood View; 54.29984°N 0.91678°W	—	Mid to late 18th century	The house is in sandstone, and has a pantile roof with a coped gable and a shaped kneeler on the right. There are two storeys and three bays. On the front is a doorway, and the windows are horizontally-sliding sashes.
Spaunton Lodge; 54.32459°N 0.92507°W		1770	A shooting box, later used for other purposes, in sandstone, with an M-shaped pantile roof, coped gables and kneelers. There are two storeys, a double-depth plan, and five bays, In the centre is a gabled porch containing a doorway with a round-arched fanlight and an impost band. This is flanked by canted bay windows, and the other windows are sashes. At the rear is a doorway with a lintel containing a decorated dated and initialled oval panel. At the left end is a basement, and in the right return is a blocked elliptical arch with shaped voussoirs.
Ashtrees; 54.29954°N 0.91810°W	—	Late 18th century	The house, which was extended in 1932, is in limestone, with sandstone quoins, a moulded eaves cornice, and a pantile roof with coped gables and shaped kneelers, and the extension is in sandstone. There are two storeys, two bays, a lower single bay on the left and a lean-to on the right. The doorway is flanked by sash windows, and the other windows on the front are tripartite sashes.
Beckside Cottage; 54.30244°N 0.91960°W	—	Late 18th century	A stone house on a plinth, with quoins, and a pantile roof with a coped gable and square-ended kneelers. There are two storeys and two bays. On the front is a weatherboarded porch, and the windows are horizontally-sliding sashes.
Garden gates and railings, Hammer and Hand; 54.30135°N 0.91789°W		Late 18th century	Along the front of the garden is a low chamfered wall with cast iron railings, and gates. The posts are in sandstone, tapering, and about 0.75 metres (2 ft 6 in) high.
Moorside Cottage; 54.29906°N 0.91633°W	—	Late 18th century	A house and a byre, later combined into a house, in sandstone, with a pantile roof, coped gables and kneelers. There are two storeys, two bays, and a lower two-bay range to the right. On the front are two doorways. The windows in the main block are sashes, and in the right range is an altered window in the ground floor, and horizontally-sliding sashes above.
Pasture House; 54.29745°N 0.91680°W	—	Late 18th century	The house is in sandstone, with quoins, and a pantile roof, with coped gables and kneelers. There are two storeys with a former byre under the right end, and four bays, with the gable end facing the road. The doorway has a single fixed light to the left, and the other windows are casements.
Turnpool House; 54.30273°N 0.91988°W		1782	The house, which was later extended, is in sandstone, rendered at the rear, with quoins, and a pantile roof with coped gables and shaped kneelers. There are two storeys, three bays, and an extension to the left. On the front is a doorway with a lintel containing a rectangular initialled datestone. The windows are horizontally-sliding sashes.
Barmoors; 54.30768°N 0.92487°W	—	1783	A shooting box and outbuilding, later a house, in sandstone, with a stepped aves course, and a pantile roof with coped gables, shaped kneelers and ball and pedestal finials. There are two storeys and four bays, and a single-storey bay on the left. On the front are three doorways, and the windows are sashes. Over a doorway is an initialled and dated oval panel. The left bay has a square bay window with chamfered mullions.
Hammer and Hand; 54.30135°N 0.91780°W		1784	An inn, later a private house, in sandstone on a plinth, with quoins, a floor band, a moulded eaves course, gutters on iron brackets, and a pantile roof with coped gables and shaped kneelers. There are two storeys, three bays, and a rear wing. In the centre is a doorway with a rusticated surround, above which is a decorative datestone. Over this is a Venetian window with a keystone, and the other windows are sashes with keystones.
Burnley House and Moorlands, railings and gates 54.29931°N 0.91691°W		1787	A pair of sandstone houses on a chamfered plinth, with chamfered quoins, a moulded eaves course, and a pantile roof kneelers.with coped gables and shaped There are two storeys, five bays, and an outshut. Steps lead to the two doorways, one has a divided fanlight, and above it is an initialled datestone. The windows are sashes, some with architraves. In front of the houses are cast iron railings on a low stone plinth, containing gates.
South Oxclose Farmhouse; 54.28948°N 0.91060°W	—	c. 1800	The farmhouse is in limestone, with quoins, a stepped eaves course, and a pantile roof with a coped gable and a shaped kneeler on the left. There are two storeys, three bays, a recessed single-bay wing on the left, and a rear outshut. In the angle is a lean-to porch, and the windows are sashes, one horizontally-sliding.
Prospect Farmhouse; 54.30034°N 0.91726°W		1823	A house and cottage in sandstone, with a pantile roof, coped gables and shaped kneelers. There are two storeys, three bays, and a single-bay extension to the right. On the front are two doorways, and the windows are sashes. In the right return is a re-set semicircular carriage arch with voussoirs and a dated keystone.
Jasmine Cottage; 54.30024°N 0.91777°W		Early 19th century	The house, which incorporates earlier material, is in sandstone with a stepped eaves course, and a pantile roof with coped gables and shaped kneelers. There are two storeys, a single bay on the front, and a single-storey lean-to on the left. There is a doorway in both parts, and the windows are sashes, those in the lean-to horizontally-sliding.
Rose Cottage; 54.30216°N 0.91881°W		Early 19th century	The house is in stone with a pantile roof. There are two storeys and two bays. In the centre is a gabled timber porch, and the windows are horizontally-sliding sashes. Above the doorway is a re-set initialled datestone.
Sundial south of Spaunton Lodge; 54.32444°N 0.92512°W	—	1833	The sundial is in sandstone, and has a pedestal about 1.10 metres (3 ft 7 in) high. On the top is an inscribed and dated dial and a gnomon, both in copper.
The Potters House; 54.30081°N 0.91866°W		1845	A school, later a house, in sandstone on a rusticated plinth with a band, and a slate roof. There are two storeys, a gable end of one bay, two bays on the right return, and to the left is a lower longer single-bay wing. The windows in the main block are mullioned, those on the gable end with hood moulds, and in the wing is a sash window.
Telephone kiosk 54.30016°N 0.91719°W		1935	The K6 type telephone kiosk on Main Street was designed by Giles Gilbert Scott. Constructed in cast iron with a square plan and a dome, it has three unperforated crowns in the top panels.
Outbuildings east of Douthwaite; 54.30245°N 0.93568°W	—	Undated	A coach house and stables later used for other purposes, in orange-red brick, with sandstone dressings, and stone slate roofs with coped gables. The stable range has one storey and a loft, two bays, and flanking single-storey wings, linked by a wall to a single-storey four-bay block. On the roof is a cupola with an ogee roof. Most of the openings have round-arched heads.
