= John Richardson (Quaker) =

English Quaker and autobiographer

- Church: Religious Society of Friends

Personal details
- Born: 1667 North Cave, East Riding of Yorkshire, Kingdom of England
- Died: 1753 (aged 85–86) Hutton-le-Hole, North Riding of Yorkshire, Kingdom of England
- Denomination: Quaker
- Parents: William Richardson (father)
- Spouse: Priscilla Canaby (1695–1700, her death); Anne Robinson (1703–1711, her death)
- Children: Three
- Occupation: Religious leader

John Richardson (1667–1753) was an English Quaker minister and autobiographer.

== Early life ==
John Richardson was born in 1667, probably in the village of North Cave, East Riding of Yorkshire, where his father, William Richardson (1614–1679), a shepherd, had been converted to Quakerism by William Dewsberry or Dewsbury in about 1652. He was twelve when his father died, leaving his mother with a livestock farm to run and five children. John had one older sister, who died about 1682, and three younger brothers, of whom the youngest was born about 1676.

== British tours ==
Richardson records in his Life an initial "aversion in me to the people called in scorn Quakers, and also to their strict living, and demeanour, plainness of habit, and language, so none of these I learned from them." He became converted at the age of 16, which entailed being "weaned from all my companions and lovers." Richardson disapproved of his mother's remarriage in about 1785 to an unnamed Presbyterian, who tried to prevent him from attending Quaker meetings, turned him out of the house, and eventually left him just five shillings in his will." Richardson became a weaver's apprentice, and then took to clock and watch mending from a shop in Bridlington. He began preaching regularly, despite a stammer, and made a preaching tour of the Midlands, during which he met William Dewsberry in Warwick. Four more tours of England and Wales followed in 1687–1695. In about 1695, he moved to Quaker Cottage in Hutton Le Hole – a datestone in the house has his initials – and married Priscilla Canaby (c. 1672 – c. 1700), a baker's daughter, who also began preaching about 1698. Further tours of Southern England and of Scotland followed. He was left with three children under the age of five when his wife died, but the youngest also died less than a year later.

== American tour ==
Leaving his two surviving children with foster parents, Richardson set out for America as an evangelist, arriving in Maryland in 1701 after a 16-week crossing. He spent more than two years there, ceaselessly touring and disputing with Quakers and non-Quakers, on one occasion accompanying William Penn to treat with some American Indians, who made a favourable impression on him. He also visited Bermuda and Barbados.

== Later life ==
Richardson reached home on 18 April 1703 "and found my children well." In the same year he remarried, to Anne Robinson of Hutton-le-Hole. She too took part in the Quaker ministry, but she died on 18 December 1711 at the age of 33. Richardson wrote a poignant memorial to her as an exemplary wife and Quaker.

The urge to travel and preach continued with Richardson for the rest of his life. He toured Ireland in 1717 and had criticisms to make of the local Quakers for slackness. This he attributed "first by being brought by custom to be in love with strong-drink, and keeping loose company." He paid a second visit to America in 1731.

John Richardson died at Hutton-le-Hole in 1753, at the age of 87, and was buried at the Quaker burial ground of Kirkbymoorside. The House was built in 1690, significantly modified in 1790 and extended in about 1810. The property is a Grade II listed building.

Richardson's Life, published in 1757, went into several editions over the next century. There are abundant print on demand editions available, but no modern scholarly edition.
