= Kirkbymoorside Memorial Hall =

Building in Kirkbymoorside, North Yorkshire, England

Coordinates: 54°16′13″N 0°55′55″W

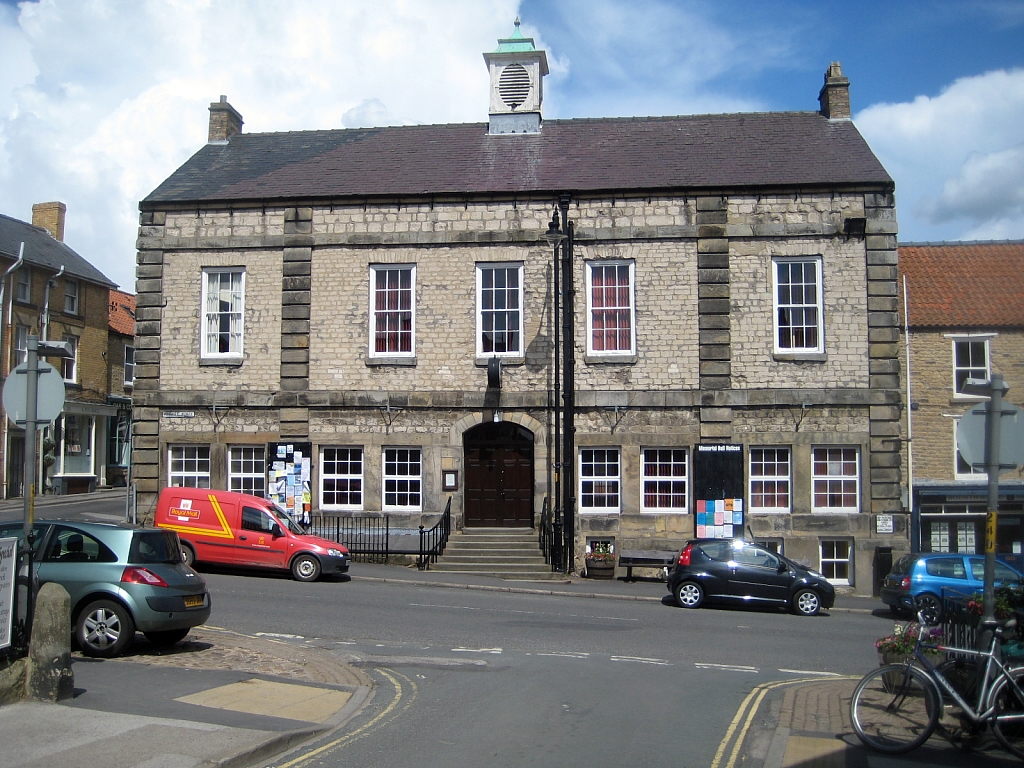
The building, in 2011

Kirkbymoorside Memorial Hall is a historic building in Kirkbymoorside, a town in North Yorkshire, in England.

The building was constructed as the town's tolbooth in about 1730, possibly on the site of an earlier incarnation. It originally had three storeys, but it suffered a major fire in 1871, and was rebuilt reduced to two storeys. In 1919, it was sold to a trust of townspeople. Plaques were placed on the hall in memory of local victims, and the building was renamed the "Memorial Hall". From the 1920s until the 1960s, it was partly used to house the Electric Cinema. The building was grade II listed in 1955. It is used as an events venue, and to host a weekly market.

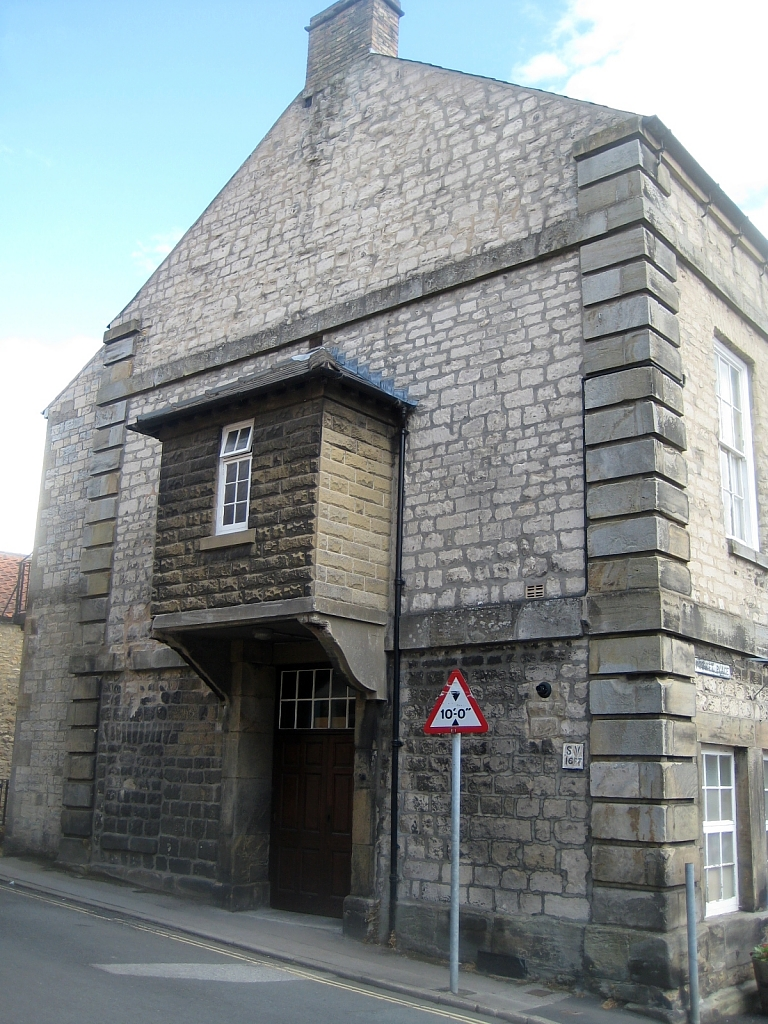
The left gable

The hall is built of sandstone, with four giant rusticated pilasters on the front. floor bands, and a slate roof. It has two storeys, attics and a basement, and is five bays wide. Steps lead up to the central doorway that has a segmental head and a fanlight. The windows are sashes, those in the upper floor with wedge lintels. On the roof is a square turret with oval louvres in the sides, and a pagoda top. In the left gable wall is a doorway with an oriel window above.

== See also ==
- Listed buildings in Kirkbymoorside
