= St Chad's Church, Kirkbymoorside =

Church in North Yorkshire, England

Coordinates: 54°16′04″N 0°55′47″W

St Chad's Church is a Catholic church in Kirkbymoorside, a town in North Yorkshire, in England.

Catholics began worshipping in Kirkbymoorside in 1859, when a prior of Ampleforth Abbey began saying Mass in a house. In 1867, a joiners' shop on Tinley Garth was converted into a church, and from 1877 it also served as a school. In 1896, William Duncombe, 1st Earl of Feversham, donated land for a new church, which was designed by Bernard Smith in the neo-Gothic style, and opened in June 1897. It is dedicated both to Saint Chad and to Our Lady. In 1902, a stone priest's house was added at the east end. The church continued to be served from Ampleforth Abbey for many years, and was not consecrated until 1947.

The church is built of stone, with a slate roof. It consists of a nave, a chancel, a sacristy and a south porch, and it has a bellcote at the west end. The windows are lancets, tripled at the west end and in the south chancel wall. The walls are divided into bays by stepped buttresses. The stone altar was installed in 1947, when the reredos was made using panels from the old altar, a 17th-century wooden design, brought from Gilling Castle. The reredos was redesigned in 1967, still incorporating the old panels. The benches were designed by Robert Thompson's workshop, and were installed in the 1960s.
