= Buckingham House, Kirkbymoorside =

Building in Kirkbymoorside, North Yorkshire, England

Coordinates: 54.2702°N 0.9324°W

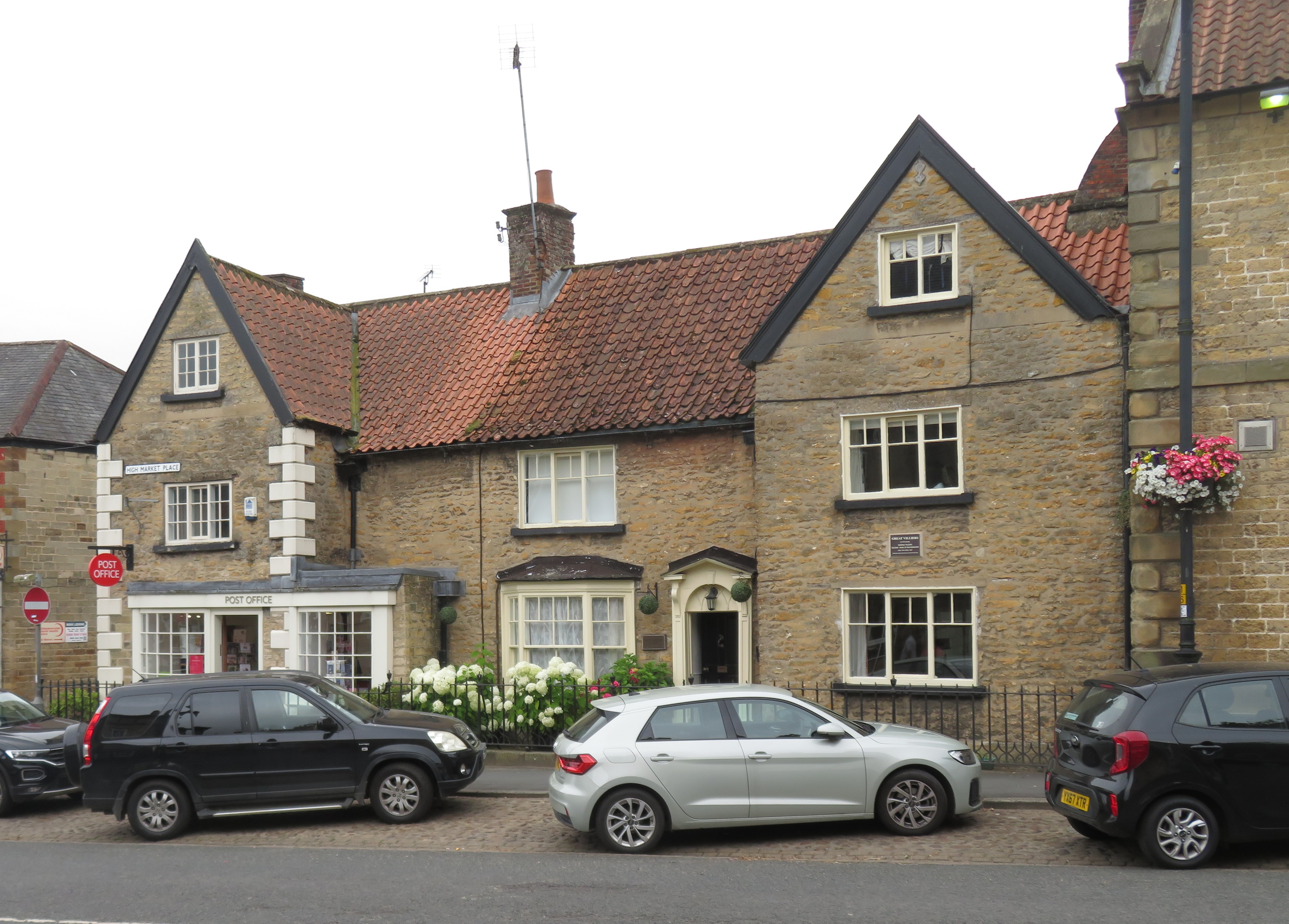
The building, in 2024

Buckingham House is a historic building in Kirkbymoorside, a town in North Yorkshire, in England.

The house was built in the 17th century. In 1687, George Villiers, 2nd Duke of Buckingham died in the house, following a hunting accident. Alexander Pope claimed he died "in the worst inn's worst room", but J. Gibson of Welburn Hall instead stated it was "the best house in Kirkby Moorside, which neither is nor ever was an alehouse". The house was later extended to the rear, and subdivided, splitting off Garth End House and a shop, the shop front being inserted in the 20th century. The building was grade II listed in 1985.

The building is constructed of stone with a pantile roof. It has a central range of two storeys and two bays, flanking cross-wings with two storeys, attics, and gables with bargeboards, and three rear wings. In the left bay is a shopfront in brick extending into the left bay of the middle range, and above it are rusticated quoins. In the right bay of the main range is a doorway with pilasters, a fanlight and an open pediment, and to its left is a canted bay window. The other windows are horizontally-sliding sashes. Above the ground floor of the right cross-wing is an inscribed plaque. To the front and side are cast iron rallings with urn finials.

== See also ==
- Listed buildings in Kirkbymoorside
