= George and Dragon, Kirkbymoorside =

Pub in North Yorkshire, England

George and Dragon
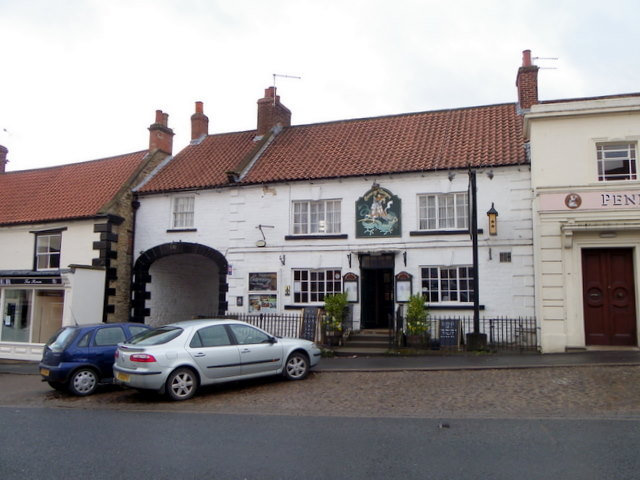
- The pub in 2011

- Location within North Yorkshire

General information
- Type: Public house
- Location: Market Place, Kirkbymoorside, North Yorkshire, England
- Coordinates: 54.2697°N 0.9319°W
- Year built: Mid-18th century
- Owner: Valient Pubs

Design and construction
- Designations

Listed Building – Grade II
- Official name: The George and Dragon Inn and attached railings to front and the Yorkshire Bank
- Designated: 5 June 1985
- Reference no.: 1173961

Website
- Official website

The George and Dragon is a historic pub on Market Place in Kirkbymoorside, a town in North Yorkshire, England.

The building was originally a medieval, cruck framed, structure. It was rebuilt in the mid-18th century as a coaching inn, and by 1811 it had stables, barns, coach houses and other outbuildings. It was later extended to the rear, and divided, with the right hand section becoming a bank. The building was Grade II listed, along with its railings, in 1985.

The pub is built of stone, whitewashed on the front, with chamfered quoins, basement and floor bands, a moulded eaves cornice, and a pantile roof. It has two storeys and a semi-basement, and three bays. In the left bay is an elliptical carriage arch with voussoirs, and quoined jambs with imposts. Steps lead to the doorway that has a divided rectangular fanlight, and a flat hood on wrought iron brackets. The windows are horizontally-sliding sashes with double keystones. In front are iron railings on a chamfered stone base, with urn finials and spiral tips.

== See also ==
- Listed buildings in Kirkbymoorside
