= All Saints' Church, Kirkbymoorside =

Church in North Yorkshire, England

All Saints' Church
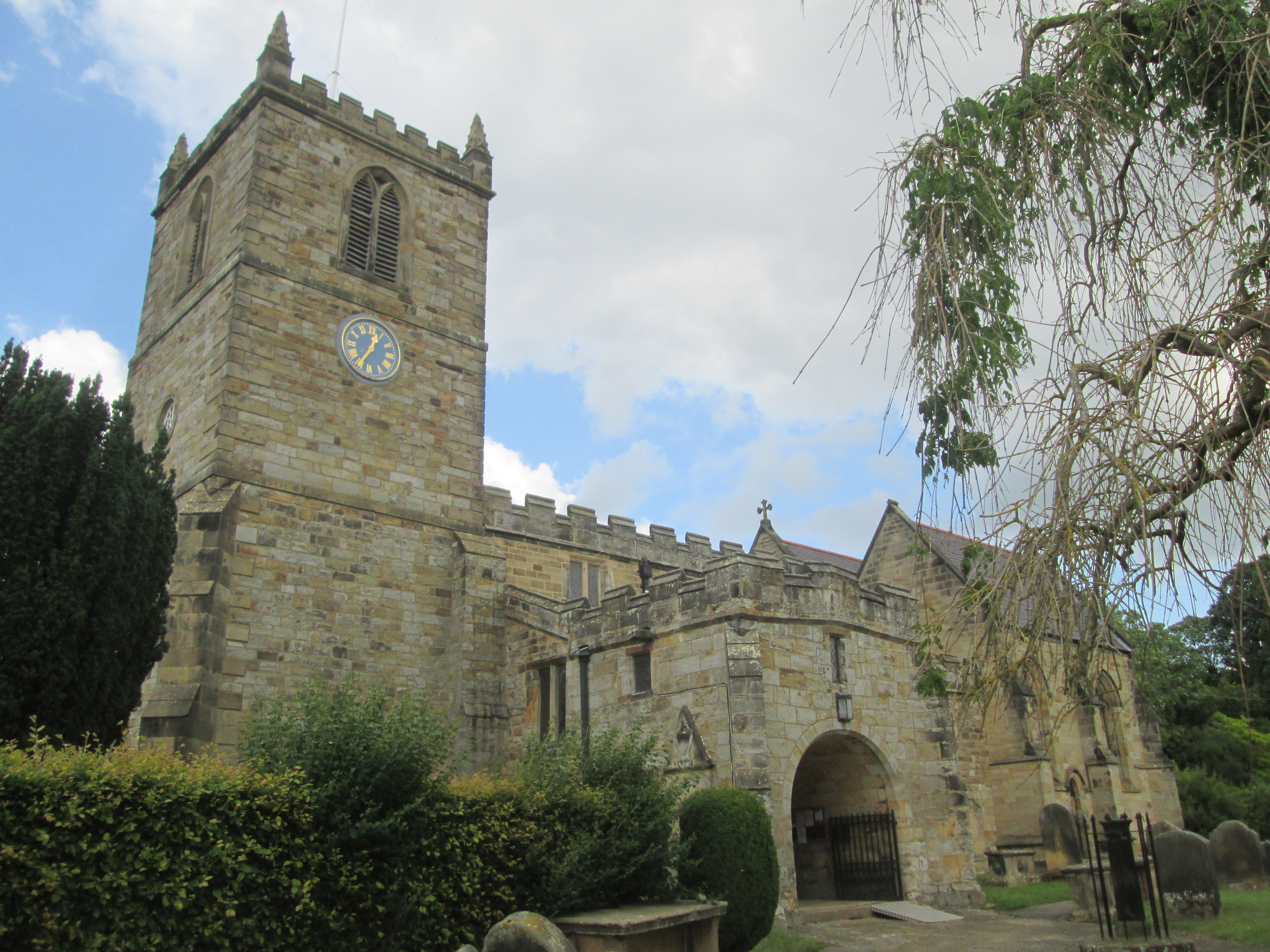
- The church in 2021
- All Saints' Church
- OS grid reference: SE 69740 86613
- Country: England
- Denomination: Anglican
- Website: www.kirkbymoorsideparish.org.uk/all-saints-kirkbymoorside/

Specifications
- Materials: Limestone; Sandstone

All Saints' Church is the parish church of Kirkbymoorside, a town in North Yorkshire, in England.

The oldest part of the current church is the eastern section of the south wall of the chancel, which is 12th century. The nave and arcades date from the 13th century, while the aisles and porch were added in the 14th century and altered in the 15th century. The upper stages of the tower were rebuilt in 1802, and buttresses were added in the 19th century. Between 1873 and 1875 the church was restored, the chancel largely rebuilt, and the north chapel and vestry added by George Gilbert Scott. The building was grade I listed in 1955.

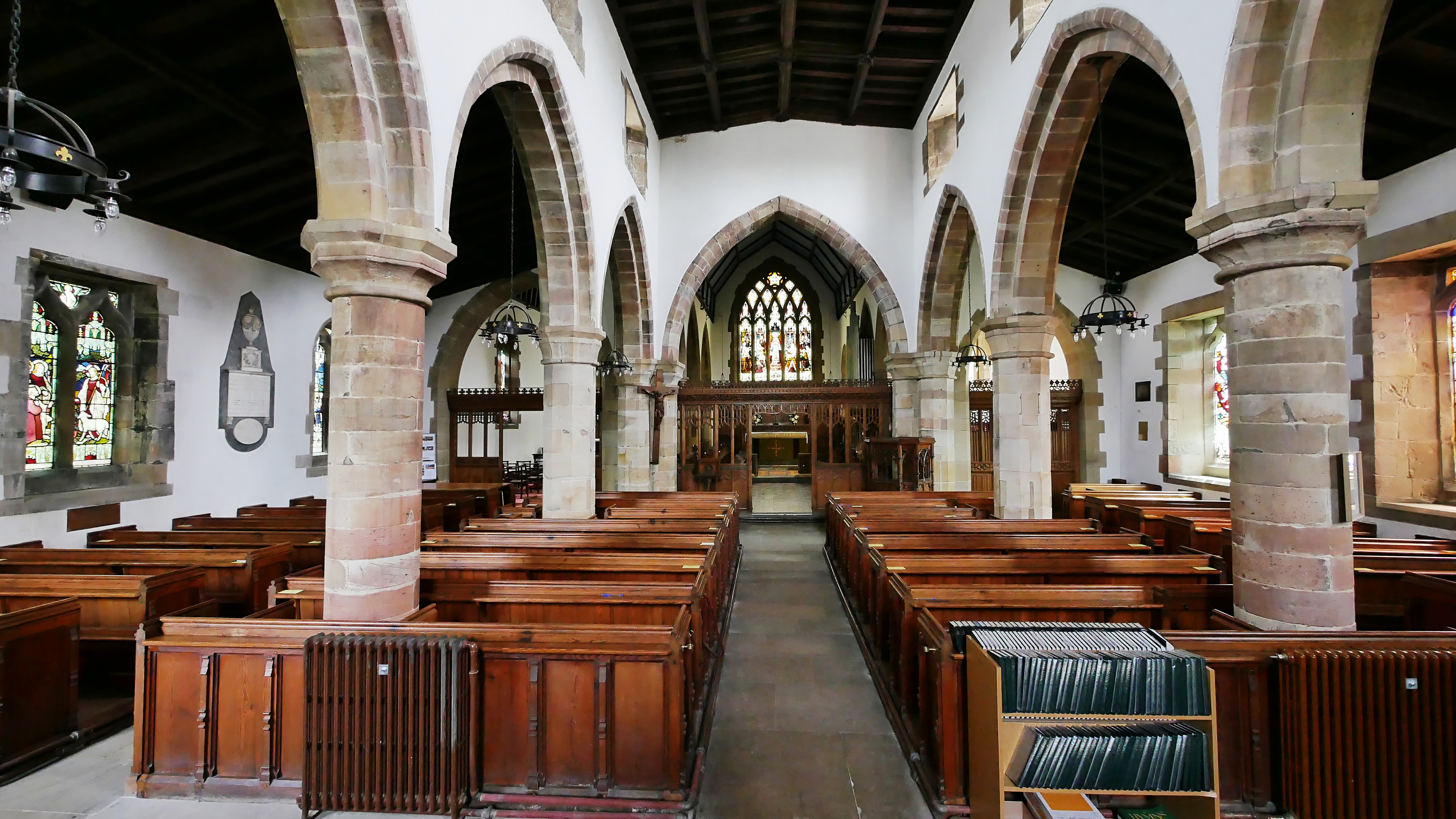
The interior, in 2017

The church is built of limestone and sandstone, with roofs of stone flags. It consists of a nave with a clerestory, north and south aisles, a south porch, a chancel with a north Lady Chapel and a south vestry, and a west tower. The tower has three stages, diagonal buttresses, string courses, glazed oculi, two-light bell openings, a clock face, and an embattled parapet with crocketed pinnacles. There are also embattled parapets on the body of the church. The porch has two storeys, with a room in the upper floor, and a tunnel vault, and the inner doorway has a round-arched head in a segmental arch. Inside, there is a 14th-century sedilia, a Jacobean reredos in the Lady Chapel, a pulpit and screen designed by Scott, and a chancel screen by Temple Moore. There is a brass memorial to Lady Brooke, who died in 1600.

== See also ==
- Grade I listed buildings in North Yorkshire (district)
- Listed buildings in Kirkbymoorside
