= Kirkbymoorside Quaker Meeting House =

Building in North Yorkshire, England

Coordinates: 54°16′06″N 0°56′07″W

Kirkbymoorside Quaker Meeting House is a historic building in Kirkbymoorside, a town in North Yorkshire, in England.

Quakers began meeting in Kirkbymoorside in 1689, and built a meeting house the following year. It is now hidden from the street behind a row of cottages. From 1789 to 1790, it was largely rebuilt, heightening the walls, replacing the thatch roof with slate, and refitting the interior. A west porch was added in about 1810. The meeting was grouped variously with those of Pickering and Malton, and it was only held once a month until about 1930, when more frequent meetings resumed. The building was grade II listed in 1985.

The meeting house is built of sandstone, with a porch in orange brick and a hipped slate roof. It has a rectangular plan, with two cells and a west porch. The brick porch has a round-arched entrance, flanked by sash windows; the window in the right return is tripartite, and there are two further sash windows in the rear wall. On the north side is a modern stone extension containing toilets. Inside, the space is divided into two, the larger southern room with a gallery, accessed by a stair from the porch. It has wooden panelling and six wooden benches, which probably date from 1789. The smaller southern room was originally for women but now has kitchen facilities, and it retains some panelling.

== See also ==
- Listed buildings in Kirkbymoorside
