= Kirkbymoorside =

Market town and civil parish in North Yorkshire, England

Coordinates: 54°16′10″N 0°56′04″W

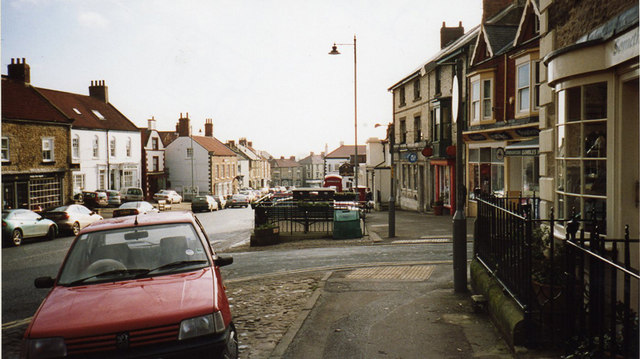
- Kirkbymoorside market place

- Location within North Yorkshire
- Population: 3,040 (2011 census)
- OS grid reference: SE696865
- Civil parish: Kirkbymoorside
- Unitary authority: North Yorkshire
- Ceremonial county: North Yorkshire
- Region: Yorkshire and the Humber
- Country: England
- Sovereign state: United Kingdom
- Post town: YORK
- Postcode district: YO62
- Dialling code: 01751
- Police: North Yorkshire
- Fire: North Yorkshire
- Ambulance: Yorkshire
- UK Parliament: Thirsk and Malton

Kirkbymoorside (/ˌkɜːrbiˈmʊərsaɪd/), sometimes spelled Kirbymoorside, is a market town and civil parish in North Yorkshire, England. It is 25 miles (40 km) north of York; midway between Pickering and Helmsley, and on the edge of the North York Moors National Park. The parish had a population of 3,040 in the 2011 census.

== Etymology ==
There is some disagreement over the spelling of the name. Most documents and road signs use Kirkbymoorside, but the alternative of Kirbymoorside more closely corresponds to how it is traditionally pronounced, and is how the railway companies spelled the name.

"Kirk" means church and "-by" is the Viking word for settlement, so that the name translates as "settlement with a church by the moorside", or as Ekwall argues, Moorside is "Moresheved" which means "top of the moor". A valley near the town is known as Kirkdale.

== History ==
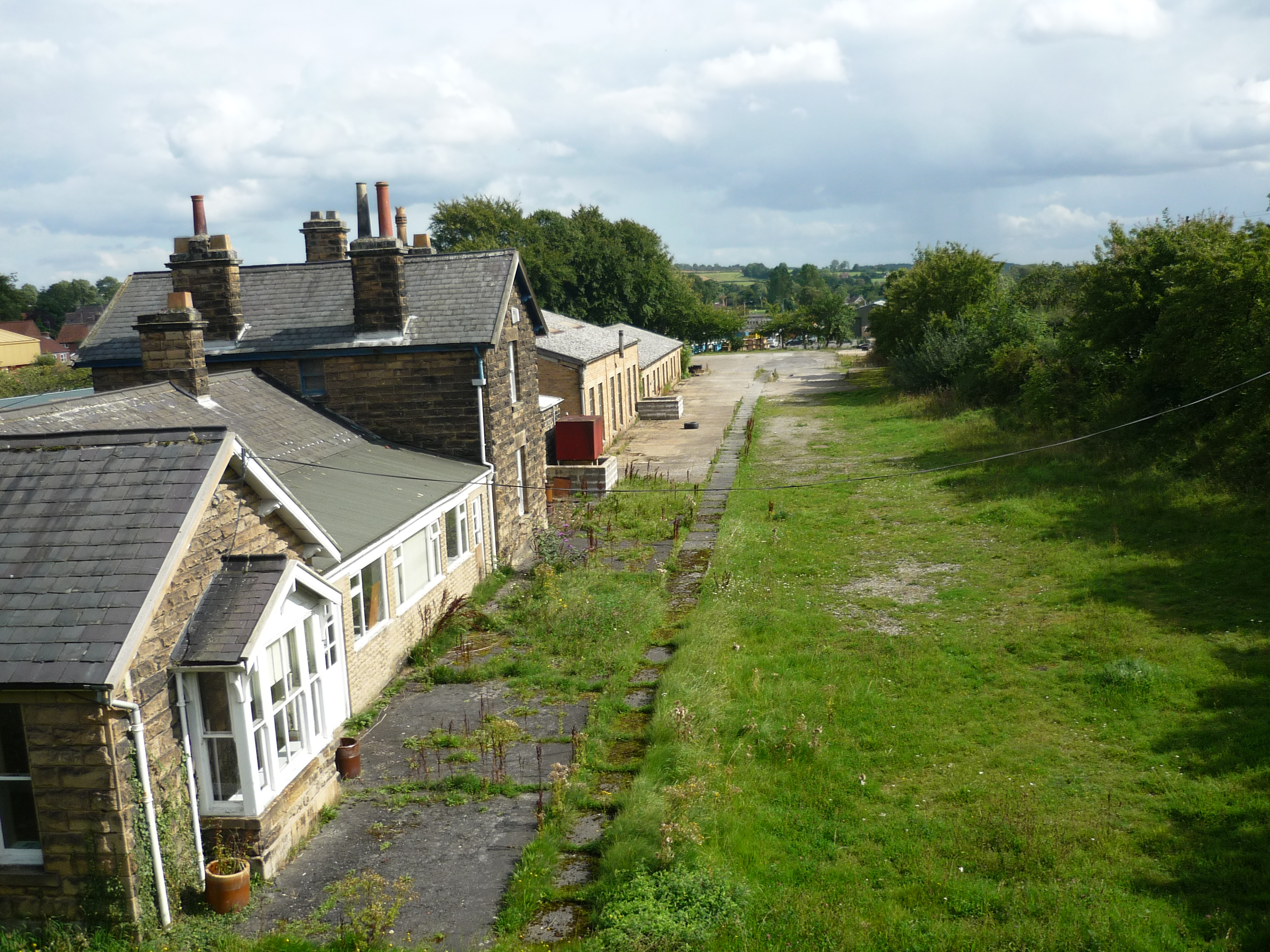
Kirkbymoorside's former railway station in 2008

Kirkbymoorside is noted as Chirchebi in the Domesday Book of 1086. It has served as a trading hub at least since 1254, when it became a market town. There are two ancient coaching inns extant, The Black Swan with its carved porch, and The George and Dragon, which originated in the 13th century. The Georgian façades point to later periods of commercial prosperity on the coaching route between York and Scarborough.

Some Ancient British, Viking and Anglo-Saxon remains have been found in the vicinity. The Norman baron Robert de Stuteville built a wooden moated castle on Vivers Hill. The estate passed to the Wake family in the 13th century, who brought prosperity to the town. However, it was badly hit by the Black Death of the mid-14th century, after which the wooden castle lay in ruins. Prosperity returned after 1408, when the Neville family took over, although little remains of the fortified manor they built to the north of the town. The Nevilles remained Catholic and took part in the Rising of the North of 1569. By 1660 there was a grammar school. (The building is now part of the library.) The great Toll Booth in the middle of the town was built about 1730 with stone taken from the Nevilles' manor. Kirkbymoorside Memorial Hall, the old market hall, was gutted by fire but rebuilt in 1872. By 1881 the population of the town was 2,337.

George Villiers, 2nd Duke of Buckingham, died on 16 April 1687, in the house of a local tenant, from a chill caught whilst hunting nearby. The building, Buckingham House is located in the town centre.

Manor Vale, a stretch of woodland managed by the town council, was part of a deer park and contains the Grade II remains of the manor. It contains areas of both acidic and alkaline soil. It is home to a rare beetle species, Oedemera virescens.

In the 1600s and at least until the 1700s, a number of Quakers resided in this area and in nearby Hutton-le-Hole. Kirkbymoorside Quaker Meeting House was built in 1690, although it was significantly modified in 1790 and extended in about 1810. This property is a Grade II listed building. The Quaker evangelist John Richardson died in Hutton-le-Hole in 1753 and was buried at the Meeting Hall's burial site.

In 1874, the North Eastern Railway's Gilling and Pickering line opened, connecting Kirbymoorside station to Helmsley and York. It was extended to Pickering the following year. The regular passenger service (and the track east to Pickering) ceased in 1953 but freight traffic and occasional special passenger trains continued until 1964. The rails between Kirkbymoorside and Pickering were lifted in the 1950s and the A170 road runs over part of the track bed to the east of the town. The station buildings were demolished in 2010 and the site is now occupied, in part, by new houses.

== Governance ==
Kirkbymoorside is in the Thirsk and Malton constituency, which is represented in the UK Parliament by Kevin Hollinrake of the Conservative Party.

From 1974 until 2023 Kirkbymoorside was part of the district of Ryedale in the county of North Yorkshire. Since 2023, it has been part of the unitary authority area of North Yorkshire. Kirkbymoorside is part of the Kirkbymoorside and Dales electoral division, which is represented on the North Yorkshire Council by Greg White of the Conservative Party.

As a town and civil parish, Kirkbymoorside also has a town council, with 7 elected councillors. It is responsible for a number of local services.

== Economy ==
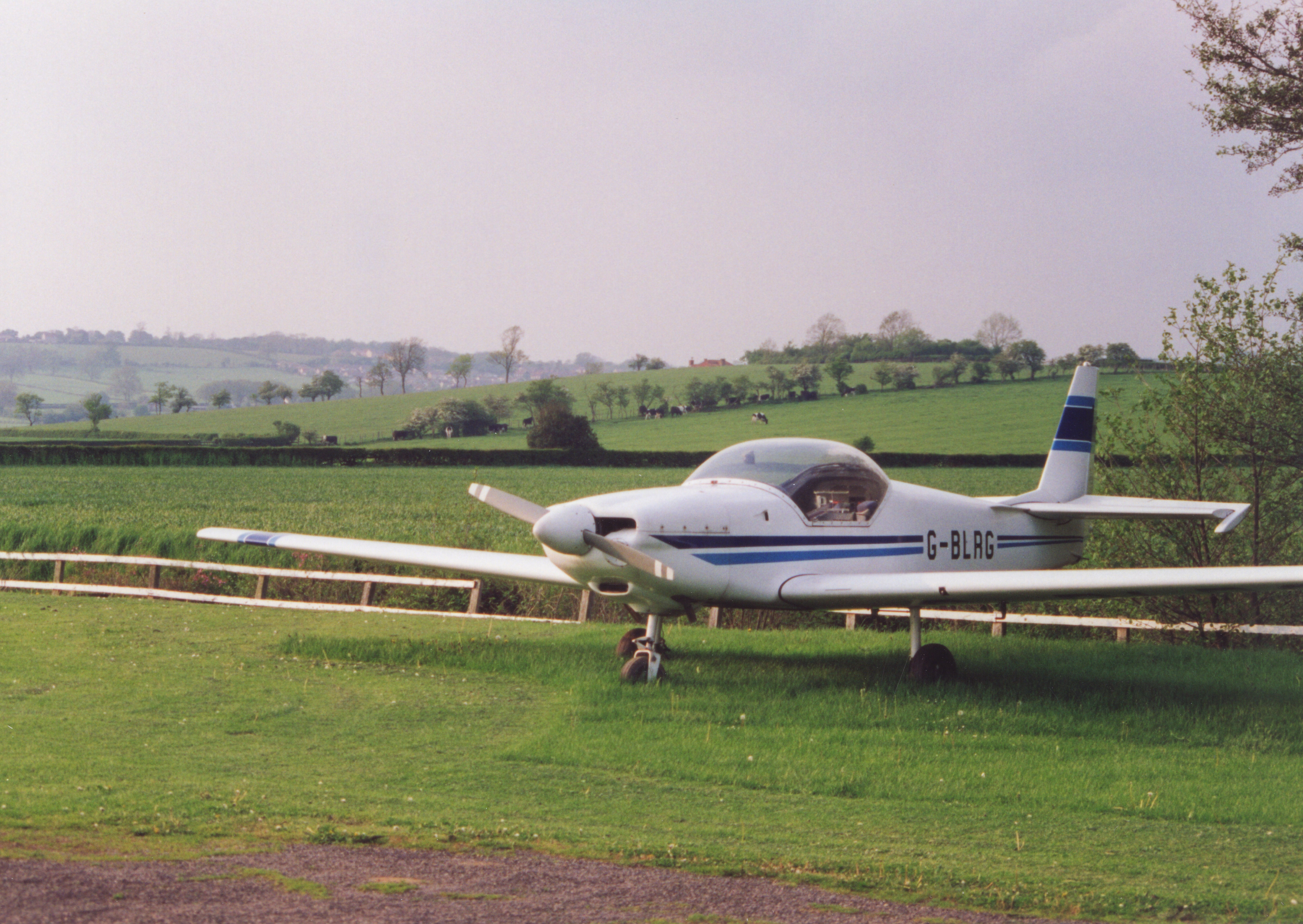
A Firefly aircraft parked outside the Slingsby Aviation factory at Kirkbymoorside, UK, in 1993

The town was home to one of the few remaining British producers of light aircraft, Slingsby Aviation. (The other is Britten-Norman on the Isle of Wight). Many sub-sea vehicles and robots are manufactured at Forum Energy Technologies (formerly Perry Slingsby Systems) which is located on the same site, roughly 1 mile south of the town centre.

== Culture and community ==
The town is home to Kirkbymoorside Town Brass Band, which has achieved success on a national level, most recently winning the North of England Brass Band First Section Championship in 2004, 2008 and 2015. As a result of their 2008 success, the band competed in the National Finals in Harrogate on 28 September 2008 and claimed 3rd place overall.

The anarchist poet and art critic Herbert Read was born in the hamlet of Muscoates, about four miles (6.4 km) south of Kirkbymoorside. The area surrounding the town provided some of the inspiration for his only completed novel, The Green Child.

The town hosts the Ryedale Show, an annual agricultural show, and became one of three main locations where Daisybeck Studios filmed the Channel 5 series The Yorkshire Vet.

== Transport ==
Kirkbymoorside lies on the A170 road that connects Thirsk and Helmsley to the west, and Pickering and Scarborough to the east. The road follows the southern edge of the North Yorkshire Moors for much of its route. To the north, minor roads travel onto the moors through the valleys of Bransdale, Farndale and Rosedale. To the south, other minor roads pass through the Vale of Pickering.

East Yorkshire's route 128 runs from Helmsley to Scarborough, passing through the town via West End and Piercy End. The service runs about every two hours, seven days a week. Connections to York are by the Reliance Motor Services 31X service via Helmsley. There are 3 direct buses to and from Kirkbymoorside on Schooldays & 4 on Saturdays and School Holidays. Yorkshire Coastliner operates the 840 route from Pickering to York and Leeds via Malton, accessible by using the 128 from Kirkbymoorside. There are no connections at Pickering between the two bus routes. The 840 also calls at Kirby Misperton, the location of Flamingoland theme park and zoo, and at Malton bus and railway stations.

== Media ==
Local news and television programmes are provided by BBC North East and Cumbria and ITV Tyne Tees. Television signals are received from the Bilsdale transmitter, BBC Yorkshire and ITV Yorkshire can also be received from the Emley Moor TV transmitter.

Local radio stations are BBC Radio York on 103.7 FM, Greatest Hits Radio Yorkshire (formerly Minster FM) on 104.7 FM, and Coast & County Radio on 97.4 FM, a community based radio station which broadcast from its studio in Scarborough.

The town is served by the local newspapers:

- Malton and Pickering Mercury
- Gazette and Herald
- The Northern Echo

== Education ==
Kirkbymoorside has a primary school. The town is in the catchment area of the comprehensive secondary Ryedale School, which is located in Nawton, three miles (5 km) away, and has about 600 pupils.

Kirkbymoorside hosts an annual 10 km road-running race on the Sunday prior to May Day Bank Holiday each year. The race was started in 2000 by Malcolm Hodgson, Dr Tim Hughes and Martin Lush to raise funds for local schools. It is now run by the Friends of Kirkbymoorside CP School and the funds go towards that charity and to the Gillamoor CE (VC) Primary School PTA.

== Religious sites ==
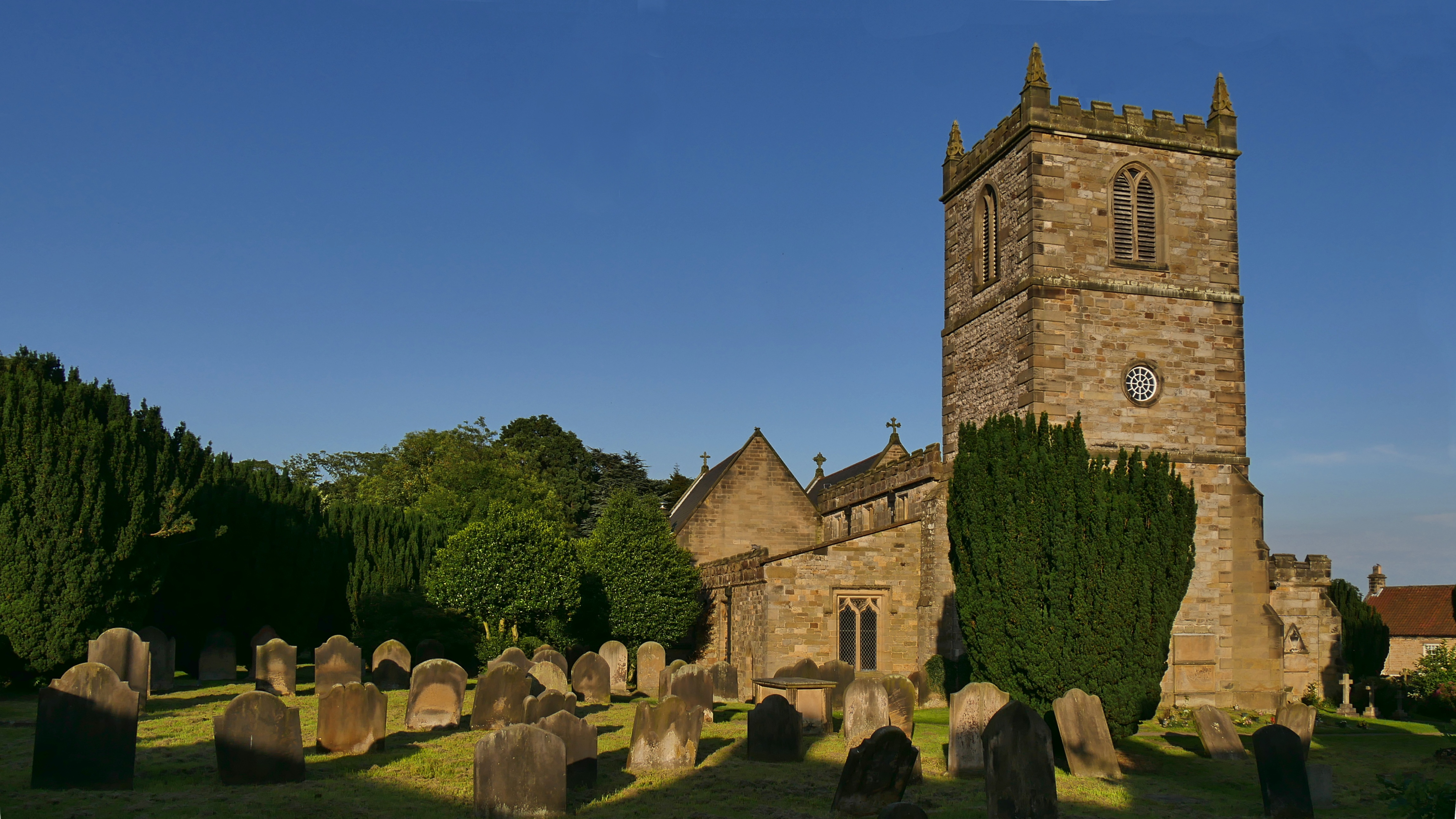
All Saints - outside

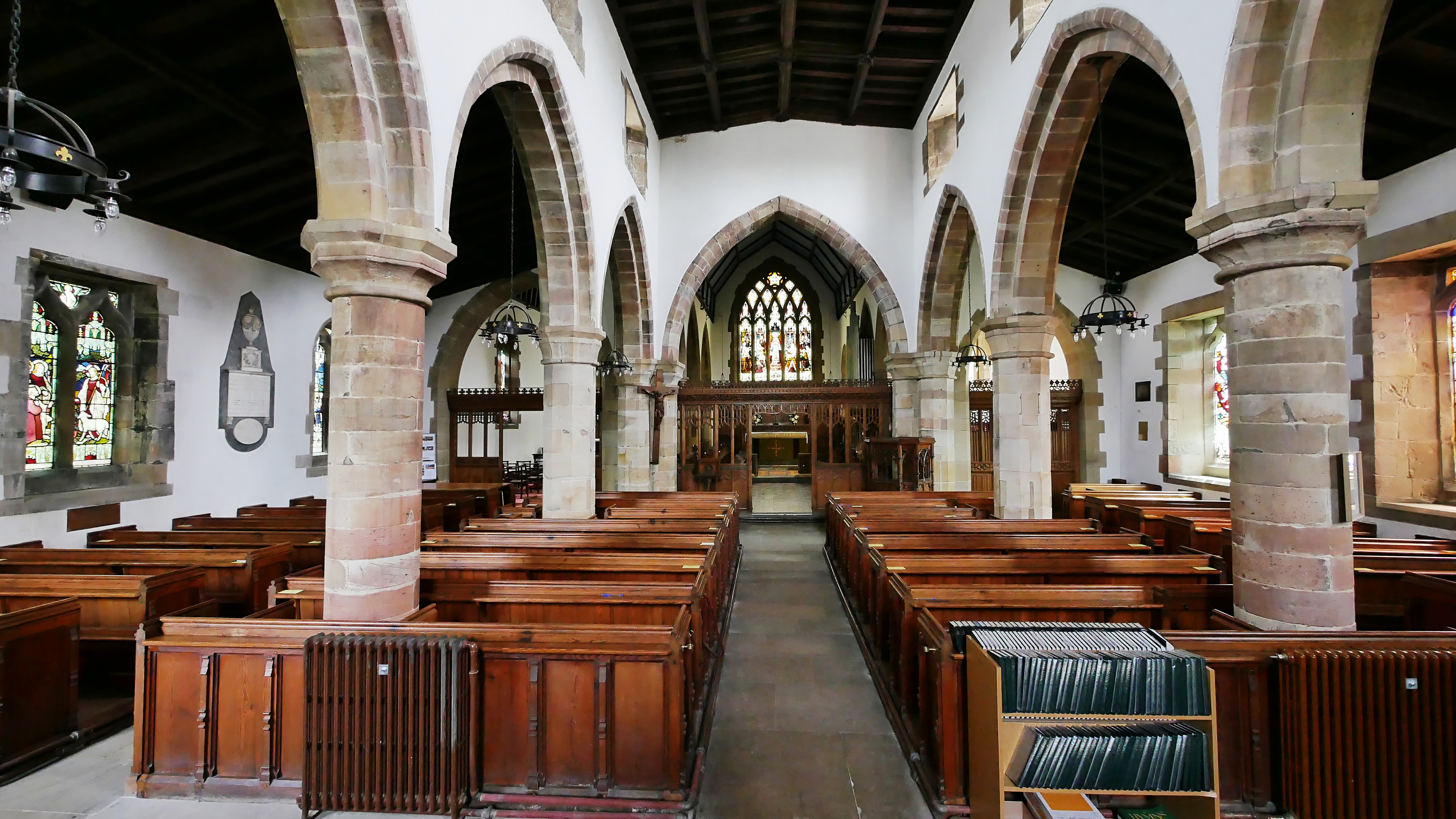
All Saints - inside

The change-ringing mechanism in the tower of the church

The Anglican place of worship is All Saints' Church, Kirkbymoorside, a Grade I listed building dating back to the 13th century, but extensively restored in the mid-19th century under the direction of Sir George Gilbert Scott. There are 187 parishioners on the church's electoral roll, of whom 27 are non-resident. There are two services each Sunday, which had a combined average attendance of 60–80 in the early 2010s.

The Catholic St Chad's Church, Kirkbymoorside is served by two Benedictine priests from nearby Ampleforth Abbey; Kikbymoorside being in the Diocese of Middlesbrough. Although the church is not listed, it falls within the Kirkbymoorside conservation area at Piercy End. The foundation stone was laid in 1896, and the church built on land acquired from Lord Feversham; the architect was Bernard Smith.

There is also a Methodist church in the town. Earlier there were also Independent and Primitive Methodist chapels. The Bethel Chapel was an independent chapel built in 1792. During the period 1861–1877 the minister was the former missionary John Abbs.

The single-storey Quaker Meeting House in West End dates from 1691. Some 20–30 people were worshipping there on Sunday mornings in the early 2010s. It belongs to the Pickering and Hull area meeting. Among those buried in the Quaker burial ground was the evangelist John Richardson (1667–1753), who left a lively account of his life as a preacher in Britain, Ireland and the American colonies.

== Sport and leisure ==
Kirkbymoorside is home to Kirkbymoorside Football Club, which has existed since about 1890. After many years in the Scarborough & District League, it moved to the Teesside Football League in 2005 and finished as runners up in Division One in the 2007–08 season. As a result it moved up in the 2008–09 season into the Wearside Football League, a Step7 League and part of the National Pyramid system, finishing mid-table and similarly in 2009–10. It took sixth place in the 2016–17 season. The club's reserve side plays in the Beckett Football League, which it won in 2010–2011.

The football club shares facilities with the Cricket Club, which as runner-up in the 1st Division moved to the Premier Division of the Scarborough Beckett League in the 2010s. The team is also a member of the Ryedale Beckett League and was playing in the top division.

The town has a golf club with an 18-hole, par-69 course. Three-times Ryder Cup captain Bernard Gallacher opened its new clubhouse in November 1998.

Kirkbymoorside being on the southern edge of the North York Moors National Park, a wide range of other outdoor activities such as walking, cycling and climbing can be done in the area.

== See also ==
- Listed buildings in Kirkbymoorside

== Bibliography ==
- Barker, Bob (1998). "Herbert Read as Novelist: The Green Child". In Goodway, David (ed.). Herbert Read reassessed. Liverpool University Press. pp. 100–122. ISBN 978-0-85323-862-1.
