= St Gregory's Minster, Kirkdale =

St Gregory's Minster
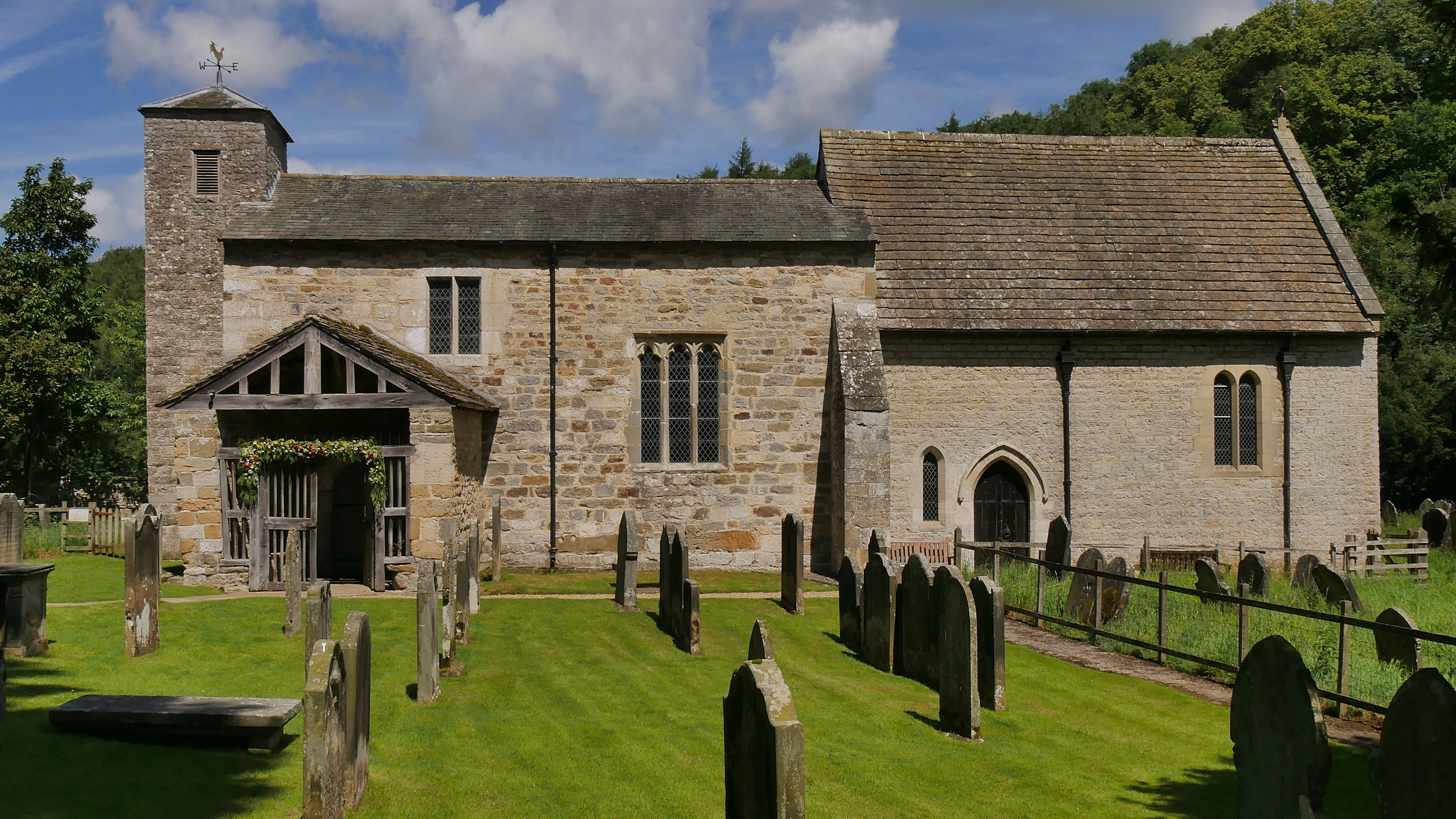
- St Gregory's Minster
- 54.26306°N 0.96278°W
- OS grid reference: SE 67687 85776
- Location: Kirkdale, North Yorkshire
- Country: England
- Denomination: Church of England

History
- Dedication: Saint Gregory

Architecture
- Heritage designation: Grade I listed
- Style: Anglo-Saxon
- Years built: c. 1060

Administration
- Diocese: Diocese of York
- Parish: Kirkdale

St Gregory's Minster is an Anglo-Saxon church with a rare sundial, in Kirkdale near Kirkbymoorside, Vale of Pickering, North Yorkshire, England. It is a Grade I listed building.

The minster was built c. 1060 on the site of an earlier church, and is dedicated to St Gregory the Great, who was pope from 590 to 604. Major modifications were completed in the 15th century and in the 1800s. The church was restored during 1907–1909. The building is similar in style and age to that of St Hilda's Church, Ellerburn.

The church is open during the day; volunteer stewards provide information to visitors and services are offered weekly. The maintenance of the fabric of the building is helped by financial contributions from The Friends of St Gregory's Minster. The Friends' Annual General Meeting is followed by the Kirkdale Lecture about the parish and its environs.

== Parish status ==
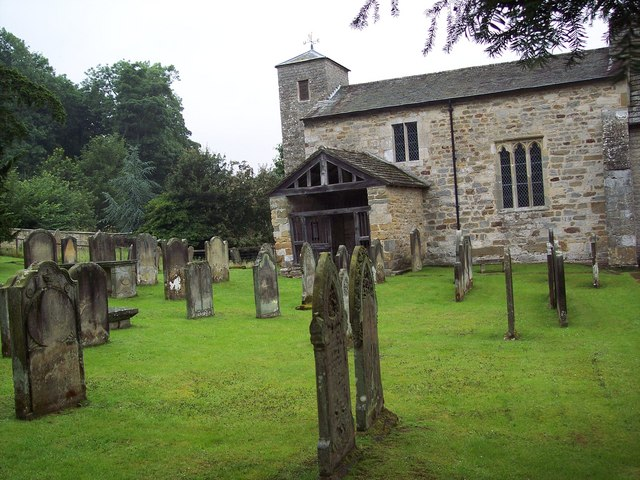
St Gregory's Minster, Kirkdale

The Parish of Kirkdale is a local ecumenical partnership with

- St Saviour's Church, Harome
- St Hilda's Church, Beadlam
- All Saints’ Church, Nunnington
- St John the Baptist's Church, Pockley

== See also ==
- Grade I listed buildings in North Yorkshire
- Listed buildings in Welburn, Kirkbymoorside
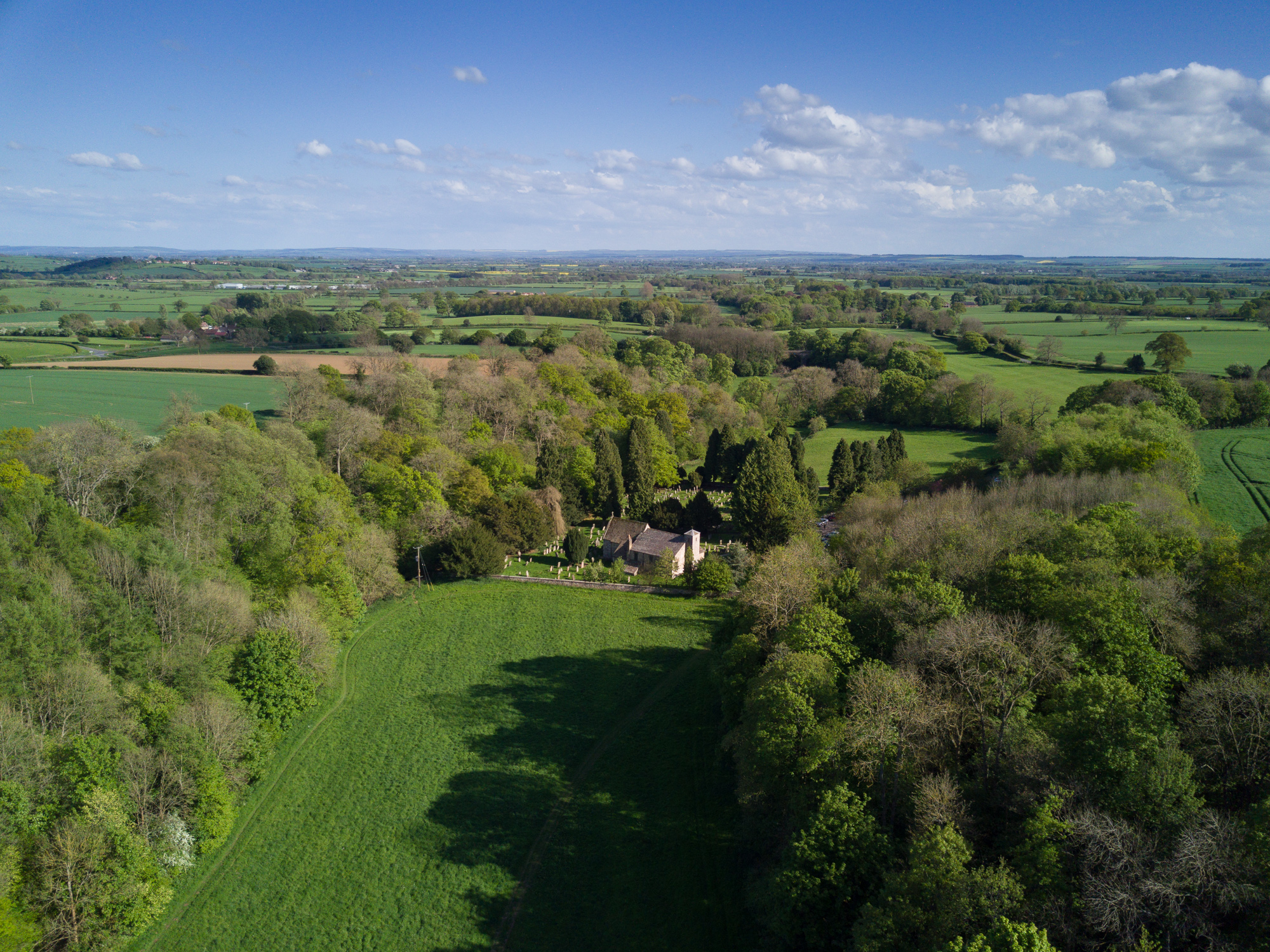
Aerial view from the north-west

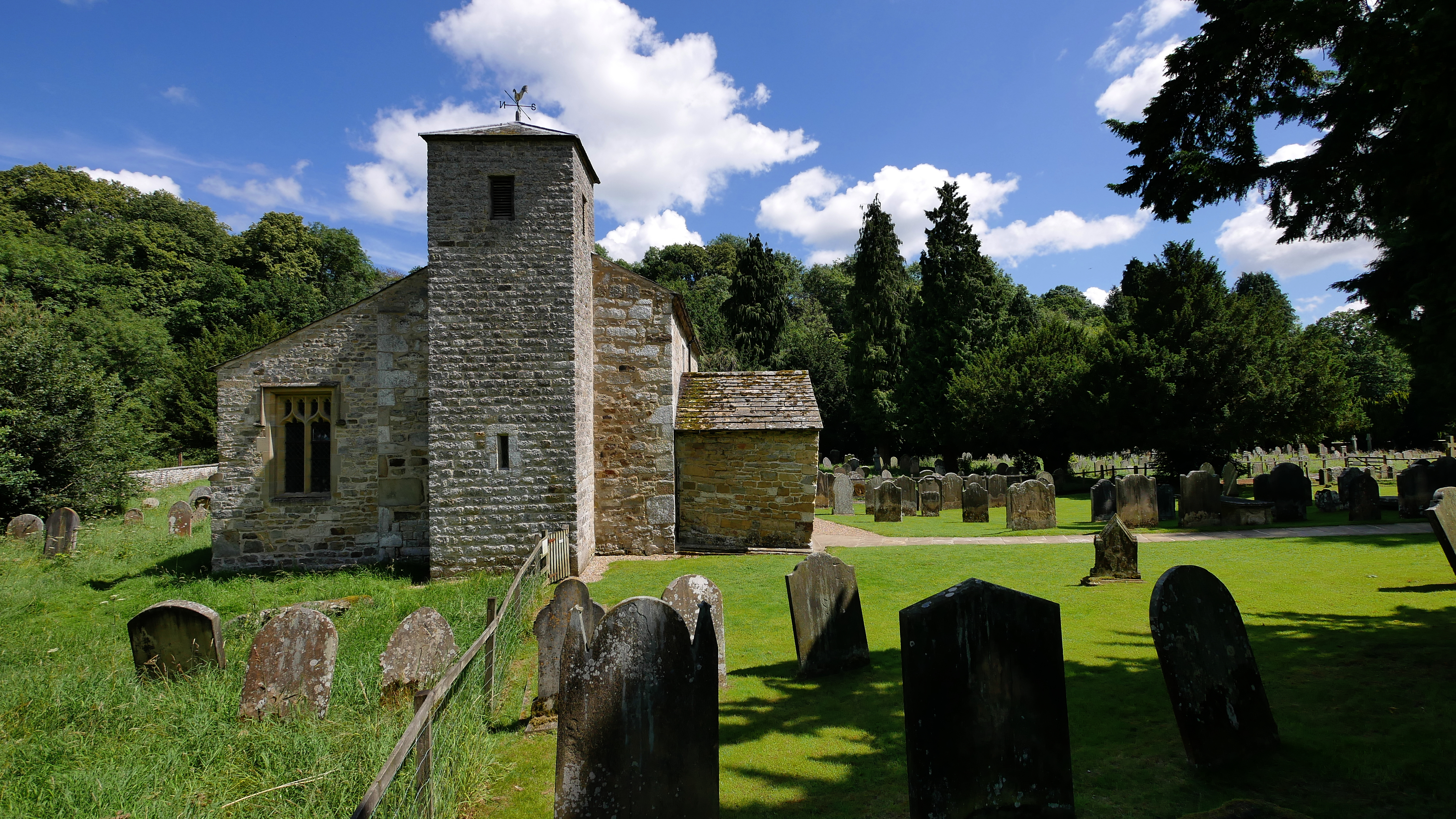
From the west

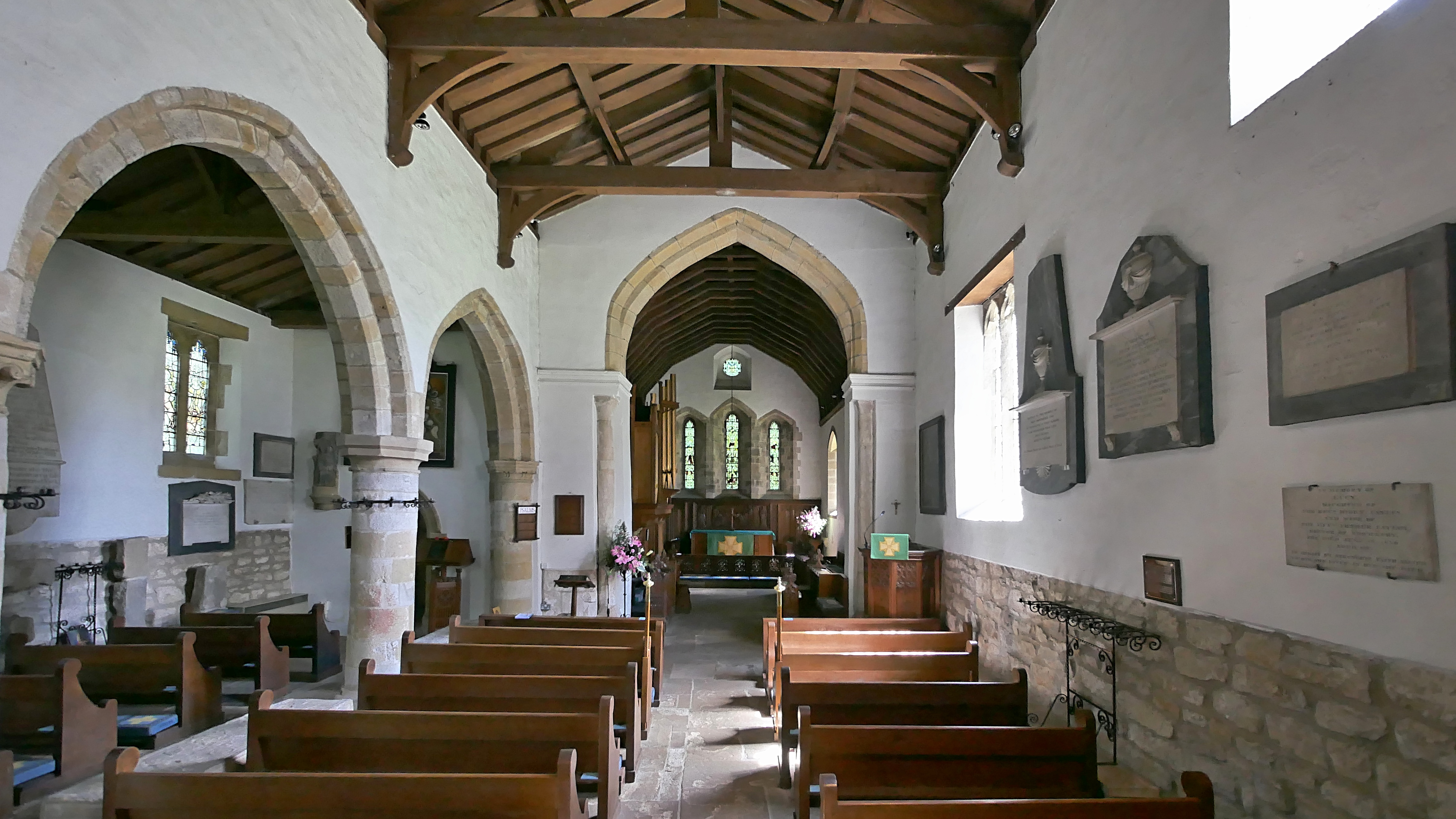
Interior from the west

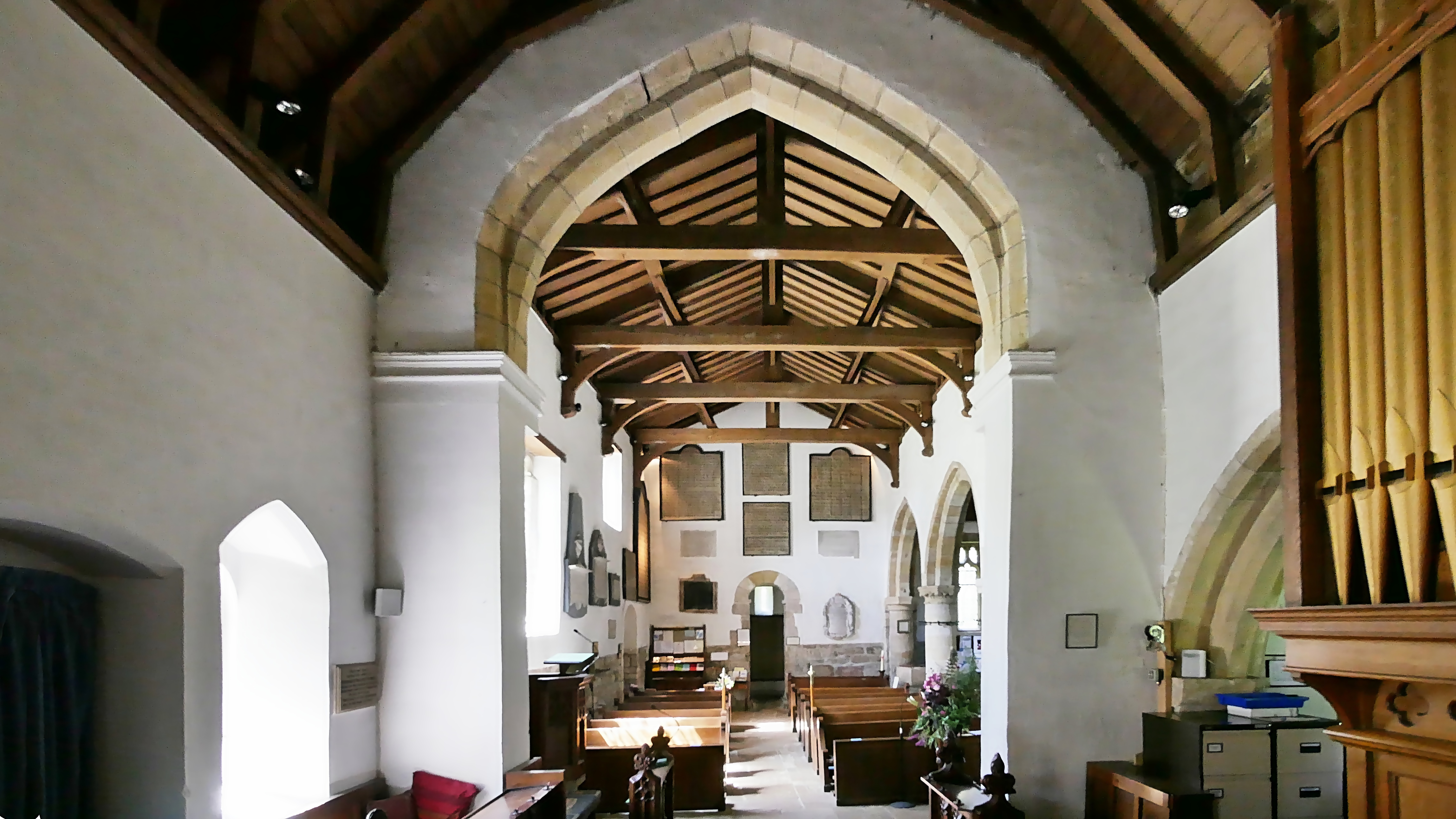
Interior from the east

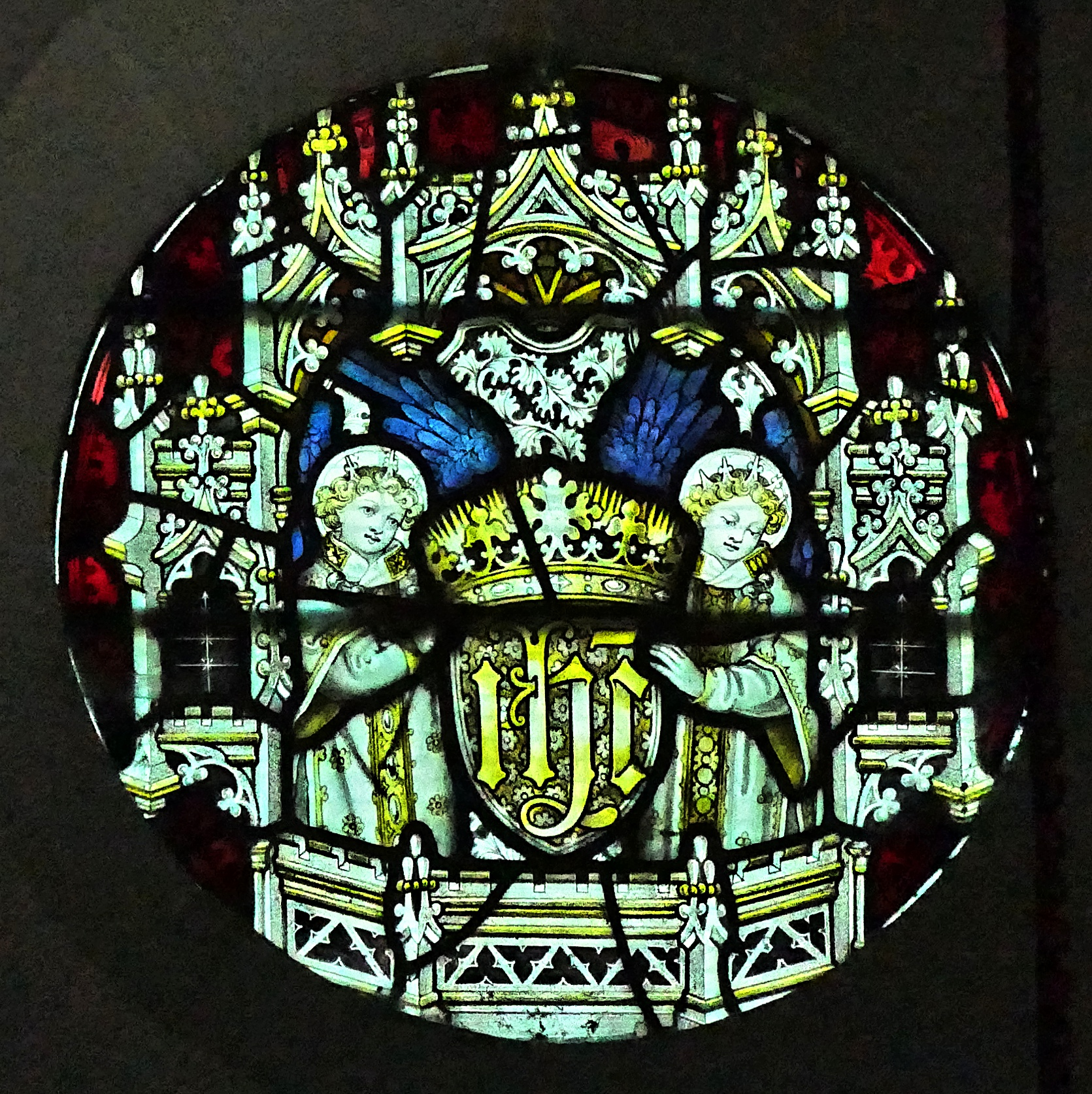
Stained glass

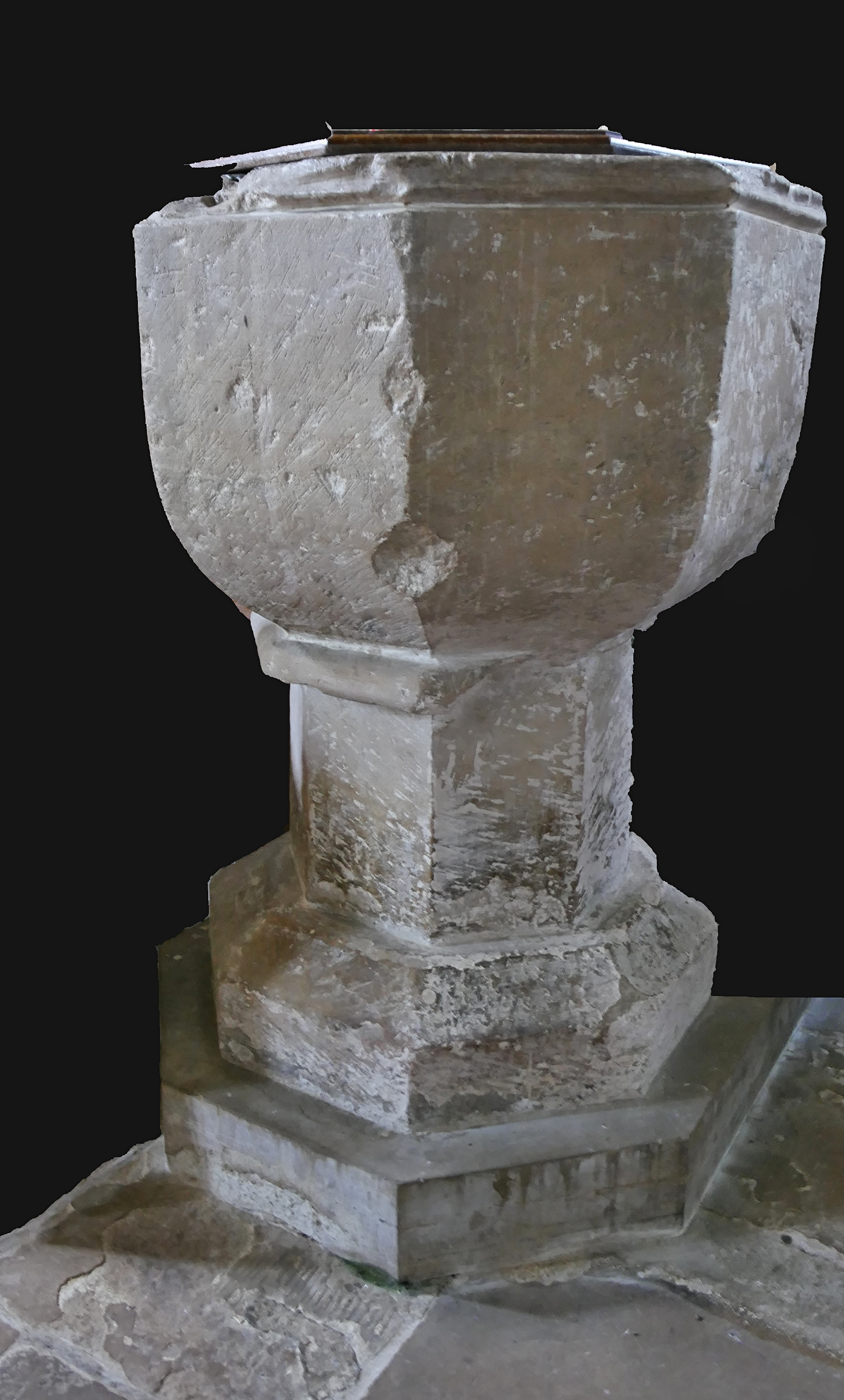
Font

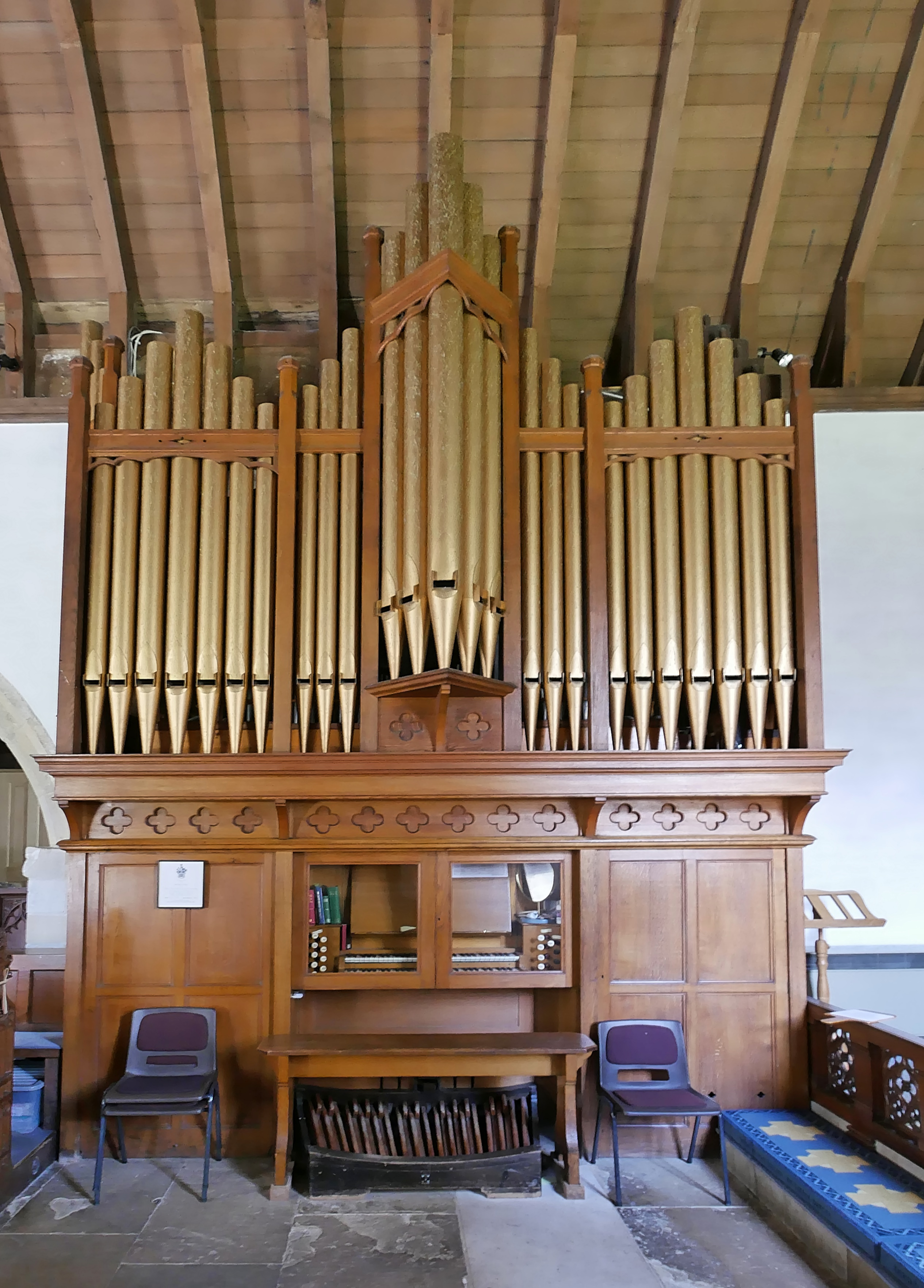
Organ

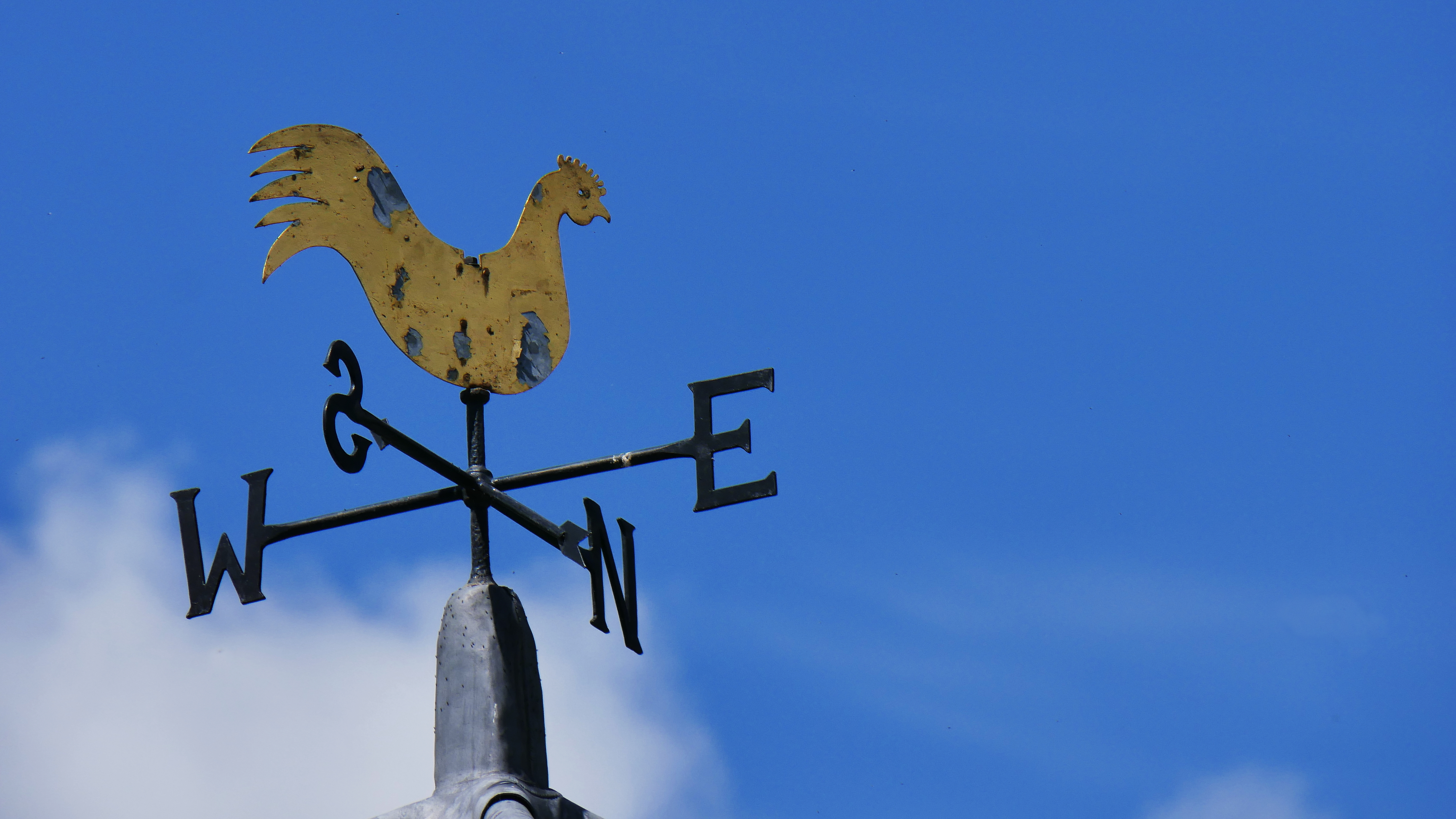
Weathercock

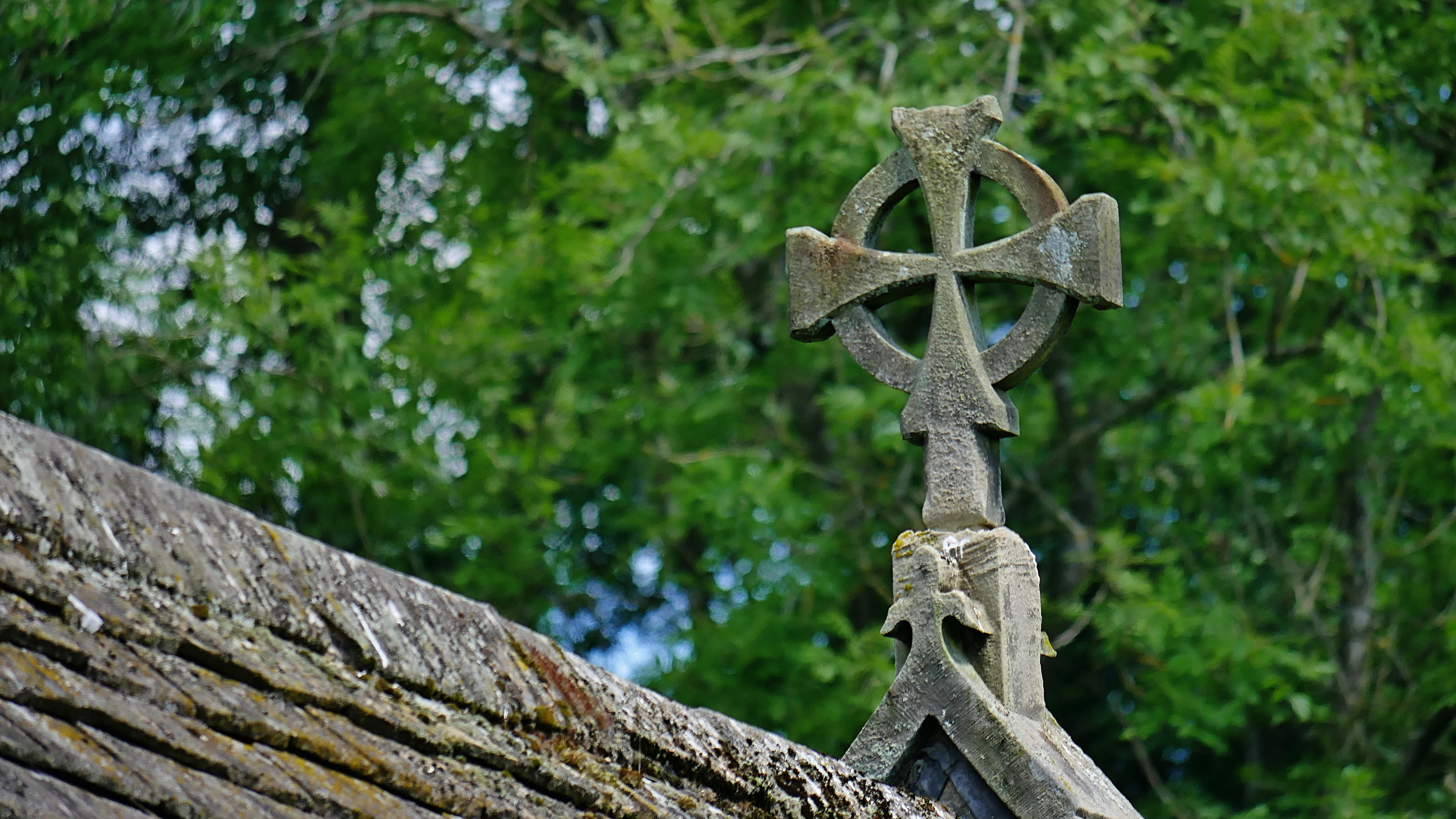
Roof

== Sundial ==
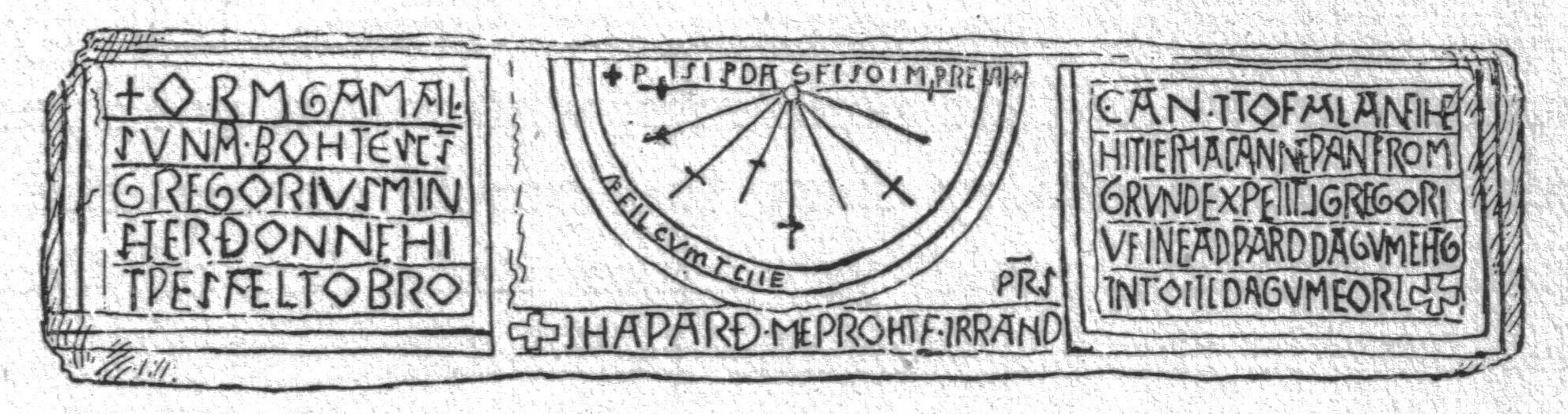
The Kirkdale sundial

The sundial above the church door dates to the 11th century (c. 1055 to 1065). The inscription is in Anglo-Saxon and is translated as follows by Historic England: "Orm Gamal's son bought St. Gregory's Minster when it was all broken down and fallen and he let it be made anew from the ground to Christ and St. Gregory, in Edward's days, the king, and in Tosti's days, the Earl. This is day's Sun marker at every tide. And Haworth me wrought and Brand, priests." The name Tosti refers to Tostig Godwinson, the Earl who rebuilt a monastery in Tynemouth Castle and Priory at Tynemouth, during the reign of Edward the Confessor, in about 1065.
