= St Saviour's Church, Harome =

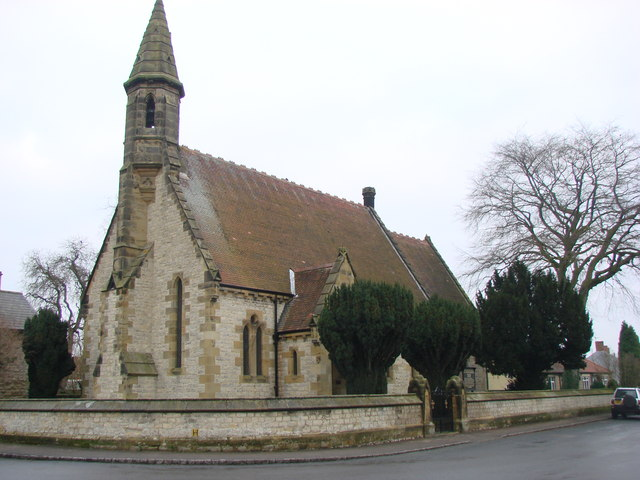
- St Saviour's Church, Harome
- St Saviour's Church, Harome
- 54°13′48.62″N 1°00′31.81″W
- OS grid reference: SE 64711 82061
- Location: Harome
- Country: England
- Denomination: Church of England

History
- Dedication: St Saviour
- Consecrated: 14 August 1862

Architecture
- Heritage designation: Grade II.
- Architect: Charles Barry, Jr.
- Groundbreaking: May 1861
- Completed: August 1862

Specifications
- Length: 73 feet (22 m)
- Width: 23 feet (7.0 m)

Administration
- Province: York
- Diocese: York
- Archdeaconry: Cleveland
- Deanery: Northern Ryedale
- Parish: Kirkdale w Harome Nunnington and Pcokley

St Saviour's Church is a Grade II listed parish church in the Church of England in Harome, North Yorkshire.

== History ==
Construction of the church began in May 1861, on the site of a previously demolished building, and was completed in August 1862, under the patronage of the Feversham Estate. The architect was Charles Barry Jr., whose father designed the Houses of Parliament. It was originally furnished by William Duncombe, who represented the North Riding of Yorkshire as a member of parliament between 1859 and 1867. The contractor was William Barton of Helmsley.

The church was built of hammer-dressed stone, with ashlar-dressed quoins and string courses. All of the stone was quarried from Baron Feversham's estate in Bilsdale.

The church contains glass from Hardman, notably the east window of 1862 which contains the subjects of the Annunciation, the Ascension and the Baptism of our Lord. Most recently a Millennium Cross produced by a local craftsman. Until 1863 Harome had been part of the parish of Helmsley.

== Parish status ==
The church is in a joint parish with

- St Gregory's Minster, Kirkdale
- St Hilda's Church, Beadlam
- All Saints' Church, Nunnington
- St John the Baptist's Church, Pockley.

== Organ ==
A pipe organ was built by Henry Jones and Sons. A specification of the organ can be found on the National Pipe Organ Register.

== See also ==
- Listed buildings in Harome
