= Nawton =

Nawton is the name of at least two places:

- Nawton, North Yorkshire, an English village
- Nawton, New Zealand, a suburb of Hamilton
