= River Riccal =

River in North Yorkshire, England

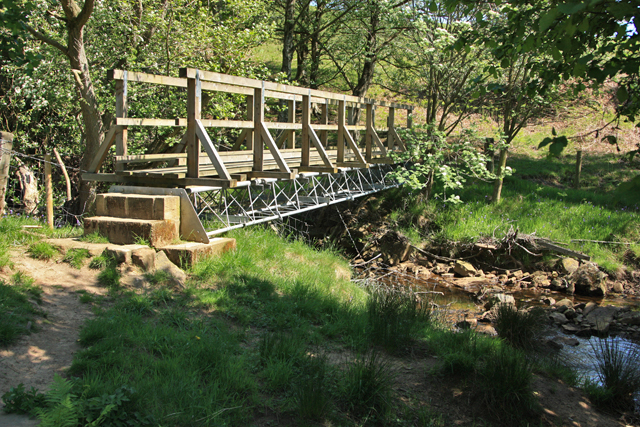
- Footbridge over the river Riccal; 54°18′3.38″N 1°3′28.26″W

Location
- Country: England

Physical characteristics
- Source
  - location: Confluence of Bonfield Gill and Bogmire Gill near Helmsley
  - coordinates: 54°17′52″N 1°3′40″W
  - elevation: 130 metres (430 ft)
- Mouth
  - location: River Rye
  - coordinates: 54°12′14″N 0°54′58″W
  - elevation: 24 metres (79 ft)
- Length: 18.36 km (11.41 mi)
- Basin size: 57.6 km^{2} (22.2 sq mi)

The River Riccal is a river of North Yorkshire, England, lying within the North York Moors National Park. It is a tributary of the River Rye, which in turn is a tributary of the River Derwent. The name originates in the fourteenth century as Ricolvegraines means Rye Calf, where Calf is a small island near a larger one. This describes the way the river, and those nearby, form islands as their nature changes due to meandering.

Some writers have misspelled the river Riccall, possibly in confusion with an unconnected village in North Yorkshire. The Riccal name was also the name of a Rural District before 1935. The river is under the management of the Rye Internal Drainage Board, a member of the Vale of Pickering IDBs.

== Course ==
Cowhouse Beck and Bonfield Gill meet at the end of Lund Ridge at Coning's Birks in Hag Wood to form the Riccal. The river meanders south and south-east through woodland, passing the villages of Carlton and Pockley. It emerges into open countryside to the east of Helmsley and passes under the A170 and continues south towards Harome. Here it turns east south-east to join the River Rye at High Waterholmes in Ryedale just a half mile from the confluence of the River Rye and River Dove.

The typical river level range at the Nunnington Environment Agency measuring station is between 0.16 metres (0.52 ft) and 0.44 metres (1.4 ft). The Tabular Hills Walk crosses the river above Carlton.

== Geography ==
The river valley, or Dale, is part of the range of upland called the Tabular Hills on the southern boundary of the North York Moors. This describes the flat or table top appearance of the summits of these ridge tops. The primary geology is limestone and calcareous sandstone with dale itself being the result of glacial run-offs.

== History ==
About a mile from the village of Beadlam are the remains of a Roman villa situated on the east bank of the river. They were uncovered and investigated in 1969 and date from the fourth century.

== Lists ==
=== Tributaries ===
- Mill Race
- Middle Ings Dike
- Walmouth Beck

=== Settlements ===
- Carlton
- Pockley
- Harome
- Muscoates
- High Waterholmes

=== Crossings ===
- Unnamed road near Howl Wood Farm (ford)
- Riccal Bridge, A170 between Helmsley and Beadlam
- Unnamed road near Harome
- Hall Lane, Harome
- Unnamed road near Muscoates
- Riccal Bridge, Muscoates

== Gallery ==
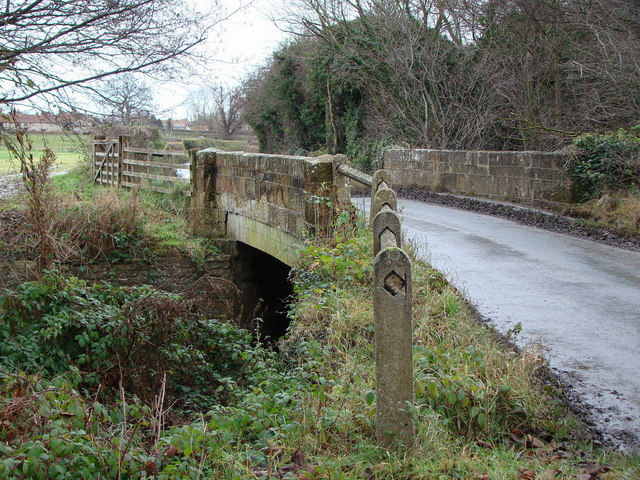
River Riccal and bridge near Harome

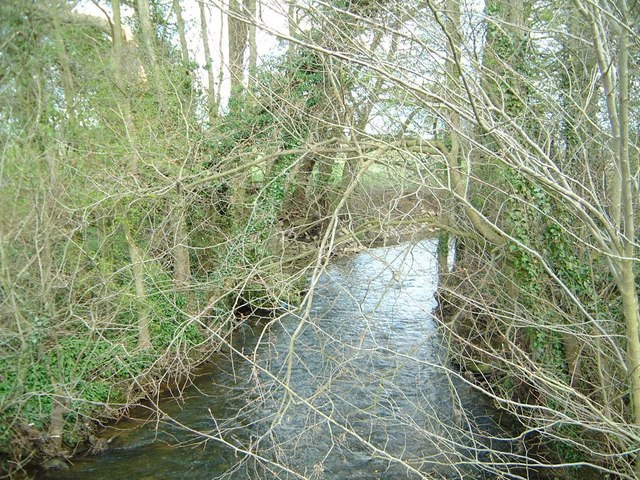
River Riccal near Harome

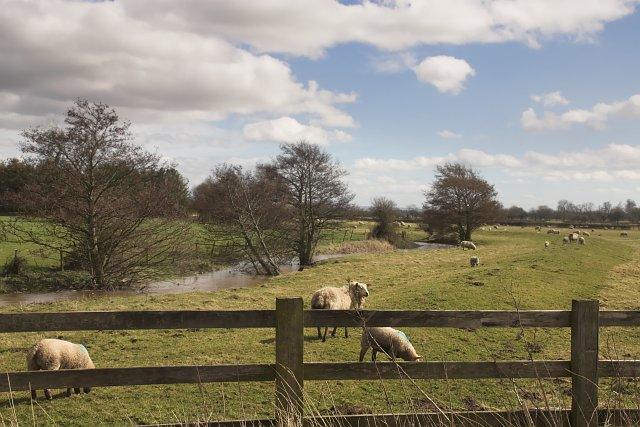
River Riccal near West Ness

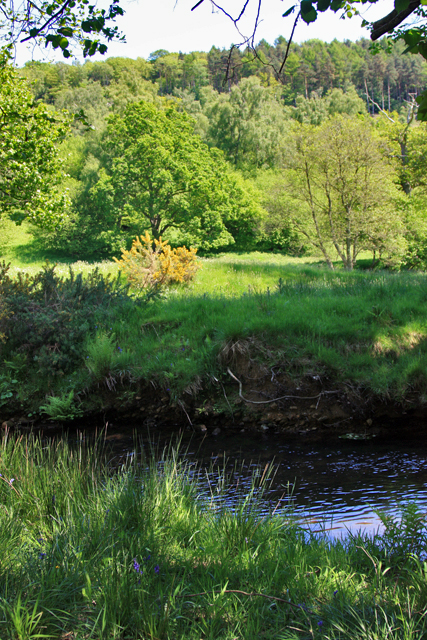
Woodland above the river Riccal

== Sources ==
- Ordnance Survey Open Viewer https://www.ordnancesurvey.co.uk/business-government/tools-support/open-data-support
- Google Earth
- National Environment Research Council - Centre for Ecology and Hydrology
- Environment Agency
