= Beadlam Roman villa =

Roman villa in North Yorkshire, England

- Location within North Yorkshire

General information
- Architectural style: Romano-British Villa
- Location: Beadlam, North Yorkshire grid reference SE634841, United Kingdom
- Coordinates: 54°14′55″N 1°01′41″W
- Construction started: Third century
- Demolished: Fifth century

Beadlam Roman villa is a Roman villa on the east bank of the River Riccal in North Yorkshire, England. It is in the district of Ryedale between Helmsley and the village of Beadlam. This Scheduled Ancient Monument is the remains of a large Romano-British farm built in the third and fourth centuries AD. The site was first explored in 1928 when Romano-British tile and pot and tesserae were found. Further excavation in 1966 revealed a mosaic pavement in a building in the northern part of the site. The field in which it was found was purchased by English Heritage. More detailed excavations took place in 1969, 1972 and 1978 when the remains of buildings forming three sides of a courtyard were uncovered.

The walls of one building can be viewed in situ; the other building is visible as an earthwork.
