= Hold Caldron Mill =

Building in Nawton, North Yorkshire, England

Coordinates: 54°16′25″N 0°58′32″W

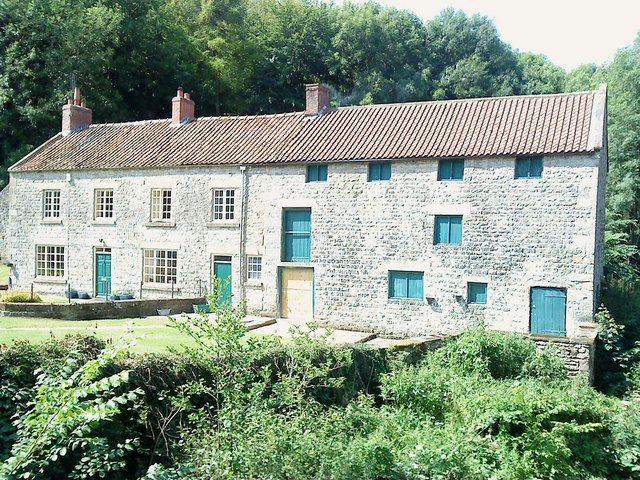
The building, in 2009

Hold Caldron Mill is a historic building in Nawton, North Yorkshire, a village in England.

A watermill was located at this location on the Hodge Beck in the 17th century, but it burned down in 1704. It was rebuilt in 1734 by Matthew Foord, the date inscribed on a stone in the current cornmill. Another datestone reading 1784 was removed from the site, while the current mill and attached house were built in the early 19th century. They were originally separate, and the house was later extended, to adjoin the mill. The mill stopped operating in 1920, its last miller being the uncle of Herbert Read, who used it as inspiration for the mill in his novel, The Green Child. The building was grade II listed in 2004.

The mill and house are built of stone, with quoins, a pantile roof, and two storeys and attics. The house has four bays and a double depth plan, and contains two doorways with fanlights, and small-pane casement windows. The mill also has four bays, and contains doorways, a loading door, shuttered windows, and a re-set datestone. Inside the mill is a 15 feet (4.6 m) waterwheel, and machinery reaching to the roof.

== See also ==
- Listed buildings in Nawton, North Yorkshire
