= Listed buildings in Nawton, North Yorkshire =

Nawton is a civil parish in the county of North Yorkshire, England. It contains 13 listed buildings that are recorded in the National Heritage List for England. All the listed buildings are designated at Grade II, the lowest of the three grades, which is applied to "buildings of national importance and special interest". The parish contains the village of Nawton and the surrounding countryside. Most of the listed buildings are in the village, and consist of houses, cottages and a public house. Outside the village, they consist of a disused mill and mill house, and three buildings in the garden of Nawton Tower.

== Buildings ==
Name and location	Photograph	Date	Notes
The Bield and Rose Garth; 54.25500°N 0.99443°W	—	Late 17th to early 18th century	A house later divided into two, it has a cruck frame, it is encased in stone, with a part brick outshut, and a pantile roof with coped gables and shaped kneelers. There is one storey and attics, and four bays. On the front are two gabled porches, and the windows are horizontally-sliding sashes.
Beech Cottage; 54.25547°N 0.99621°W	—	Early 18th century	The house has a cruck frame, it is encased in limestone, rendered on the front, and has a pantile roof. There is one storey and an attic, and four bays, On the front are two doorways, and the windows are horizontally-sliding sashes. Inside, there is a surviving upper cruck.
Doric temple, Nawton Tower; 54.28597°N 1.01456°W	—	18th century	A garden pavilion in sandstone with a semicircular plan. Shallow steps lead up to a Doric portico, distyle in antis, with a plain segmental pediment, and a hemispherical roof. Inside, there is hexagonal stone paving.
Garden portico, Nawton Tower; 54.28666°N 1.01484°W	—	18th century	The garden ornament is in limestone. It has a porch with two Ionic columns, a pulvinated frieze, a modillion cornice and a pediment. The door has panels of eight raised lozenges in octagonal surrounds in a plain doorframe.
Ionic temple, Nawton Tower; 54.28614°N 1.01608°W	—	18th century	A garden pavilion in limestone with a pantile roof and a rectangular plan. A flight of narrow steps leads up to an Ionic tetrastyle portico. This has piers with shaped imposts, and a richly carved pediment with a cartouche in voussoirs.
Rose House; 54.25553°N 0.99642°W	—	Mid-18th century	The house is in limestone, with quoins, a moulded eaves course, and a pantile roof with coped gables and shaped kneelers. There are two storeys, four bays and an outshut. The central doorway has a rectangular fanlight, and the windows are sashes, those to the left with wedge lintels and keystones, and those to the right with plain lintels.
Manor Farmhouse; 54.25376°N 0.99458°W	—	Mid to late 18th century	The farmhouse is in sandstone, with quoins, a floor band, and a concrete pantile roof with coped gables and shaped kneelers. There are two storeys and three bays. The central doorway has a divided fanlight, the windows are sashes, and all the openings have raised surrounds.
Orchard House, wall, railings, gate and gateposts 54.25552°N 0.99573°W		Mid to late 18th century	The house is in limestone, with raised quoins, a floor band, a moulded eaves course, and a pantile roof with shaped kneelers and coped gables. There are two storeys and three bays. The central doorway has a divided fanlight, the windows are sashes, and all the openings have raised surrounds. In front of the garden is a low wall with cast iron spiral railings and urn finials, and similar gates. The gate piers are in stone with ball finials.
Pond Race Cottage; 54.25539°N 0.99569°W	—	Late 18th century	A house and outbuilding, later combined, in sandstone, with a pantile roof, coped gables and shaped kneelers. There is one storey and an attic, and two bays. The doorway is in the centre, and the windows are horizontally-sliding sashes. In the left gable wall is a sash window in a moulded architrave.
Prospect House; 54.25518°N 0.99468°W	—	Late 18th century	The house is in limestone, with a rear extension in brick, and a pantile roof with coped gables and shaped kneelers. There are two storeys, three bays and a rear wing. The central doorway has a divided fanlight, the windows are horizontally-sliding sashes, and all the openings have heavy lintels.
Rose and Crown Inn; 54.25381°N 0.99434°W		Late 18th century	The public house is in limestone, whitewashed on the front, and rendered at the rear, with a concrete pantile roof, coped gables and shaped kneelers. In the centre is a gabled bay with two storeys and an attic, to the left is a wing with one storey and an attic, and to the right is a wing with one storey. The doorway is in the left wing, most of the windows are horizontally-sliding sashes, and in the gable of the middle wing is a small window.
Hold Caldron Mill; 54.27355°N 0.97563°W		Early 19th century	A disused mill and an attached house in stone, with quoins, a pantile roof, and two storeys and attics. The house has four bays and a double depth plan, and contains two doorways with fanlights, and small-pane casement windows. The mill also has four bays, and contains doorways, a loading door, shuttered windows, and a re-set datestone.
Rose Cottage; 54.25560°N 0.99621°W	—	Early 19th century	The house is in limestone, and has a pantile roof with a coped gable and a shaped kneeler. The house has two storeys and an attic, and one bay, with the gable end facing the street. The doorway in the gable end has a rectangular fanlight and a gabled porch, and to its right is an outshut. The windows are sashes, one horizontally-sliding; all the windows have flat lintels and keystones.
