= Listed buildings in Beadlam =

Beadlam is a civil parish in the county of North Yorkshire, England. It contains ten listed buildings that are recorded in the National Heritage List for England. All the listed buildings are designated at Grade II, the lowest of the three grades, which is applied to "buildings of national importance and special interest". The parish contains the village of Beadlam and the surrounding countryside. The listed buildings consist of houses, cottages, farmhouses, a milepost and a church.

== Buildings ==
Name and location	Photograph	Date	Notes
Cliff Cottage; 54.25312°N 0.99914°W	—	17th century (probable)	A house with a cruck-framed core, encased in whitewashed limestone, with a brick extension to the right, and a thatched roof. There is a single storey, most of the windows are horizontally-sliding sashes, one in a half-dormer.
Rose Cottage; 54.25461°N 1.00073°W		17th century	A cottage with a cruck-framed core, encased in limestone. The main part has a thatched roof, and the extensions have pantile roofs. There is a single storey and an attic and two bays, and a later porch and extension to the right. The windows are casements.
White Cottage; 54.25473°N 1.00030°W		17th century (probable)	A cottage with a cruck-framed core, encased in whitewashed limestone, with a thatched roof. There is a single storey and an attic, two bays, and a rear outshut. On the front is a doorway, and the windows are horizontally-sliding sashes. Crucks are visible inside the cottage.
Middle Farmhouse; 54.28929°N 1.02377°W	—	Early 18th century	A house and granary combined into one house, in limestone, with a swept pantile roof. There are two storeys, three bays and a cross wing. On the front are two doorways, the ground floor windows are casements and in the upper floor they are horizontally-sliding sashes.
Beadlam Grange; 54.24944°N 1.01746°W		Mid 18th century	A limestone house with quoins, a floor band, and a swept pantile roof with gable coping and shaped kneelers. There are two storeys and four bays. On the front is a porch, and the windows are sashes.
Pretty Cottage; 54.25436°N 1.00200°W		18th century	A house with a timber-framed core, encased in sandstone and limestone, with a pantile roof. There are two storeys and three bays. The windows are a mix of sashes and casements.
Low Farmhouse; 54.27913°N 1.02117°W	—	Late 18th century	A farmhouse with a barn to the left, in limestone, with brick at the rear of the barn, and a pantile roof. The farmhouse has two storeys and two bays. In the centre is a doorway, and the windows are a mix of horizontally-sliding sashes and casements. The barn has two storeys and three bays, with fixed windows on the front. At the rear is a cart entrance, a pitching hole and fixed windows.
Manor House Farmhouse; 54.25395°N 0.99982°W	—	Early to mid 19th century	A house in sandstone and limestone, with quoins, and a swept pantile roof with gable coping and shaped kneelers. There are two storeys and three bays. Steps lead up to the central doorway that has a divided fanlight, the windows are sashes, and all the openings have lintels with keystones.
Milestone; 54.25211°N 1.01163°W		c. 1880–90	The mile post on the north side of Linkfoot Lane (A170 road) is in cast iron. It has a triangular plan and a sloping top. On the sides are pointing hands, on the left side is the distance to Kirkbymoorside, and on the right side is the distance to Helmsley.
St Hilda's Church; 54.25324°N 0.99687°W		1882	The church, which was designed by C. Hodgson Fowler, is in stone on a plinth, with quoins, and tile roofs with coped gables and finials. It consists of a nave and a chancel under one roof divided by a gable, a south porch and a northeast vestry. On the west gable is a square wooden bell turret, with a clock face on the south, and a weatherboarded pyramidal spire.
