= St John the Baptist's Church, Pockley =

Church in Pockley, North Yorkshire, England

Coordinates: 54°15′59″N 1°01′23″W

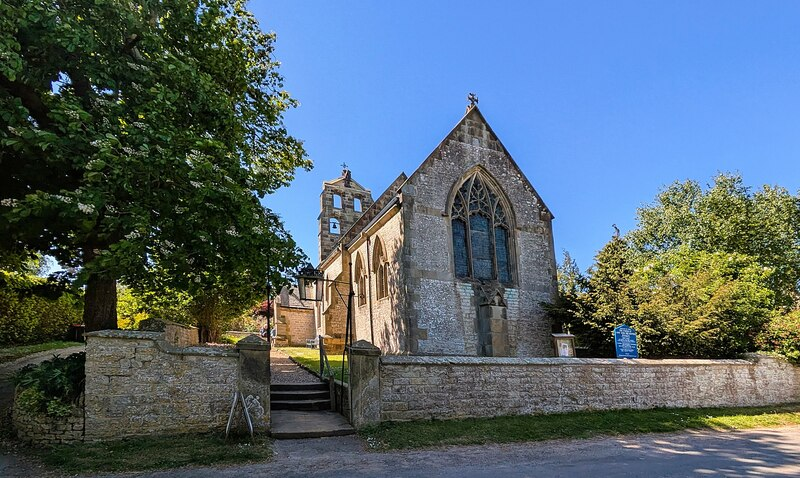
The church in 2025

St John the Baptist's Church is the parish church of Pockley, a village in North Yorkshire, in England.

Until the late 19th century, residents of Pockley worshipped at All Saints' Church, Helmsley. In 1870, a church was built, to a design credited to either George Gilbert Scott or George Gilbert Scott Jr. The building was grade II listed in 1985.

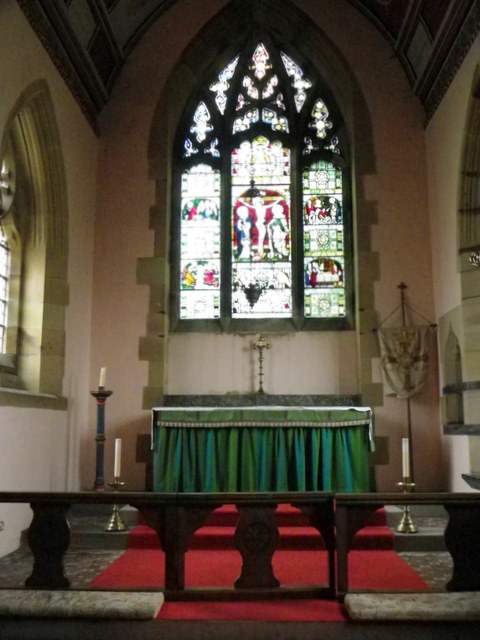
The chancel and east window

The church is built of limestone with sandstone dressings and a Westmorland slate roof. It consists of a nave, a south porch, and a chancel with a north vestry. At the west end is a central buttress carrying a bellcote with four openings. Inside, there is a 13th-century font, which was moved from All Saints in Helmsley. The chancel screen and other furnishings were provided by Temple Moore in 1898-99 and rood beam figures by Lang of Oberammergau. The church's unusual heating system was based on a Roman hypocaust. Warm air came through underfloor ducts from a coke-fired stove beneath the church. Originally the fuel for the stove was carried through a 25-foot brick-lined tunnel on a miniature railway which is still in existence but rarely used. The hot air heating system was restored in 2012 and for the first time in over 60 years the church is now warm for services.

== See also ==
- Listed buildings in Pockley
