= Muscoates =

Hamlet in North Yorkshire, England

Coordinates: 54.216°N 0.950°W

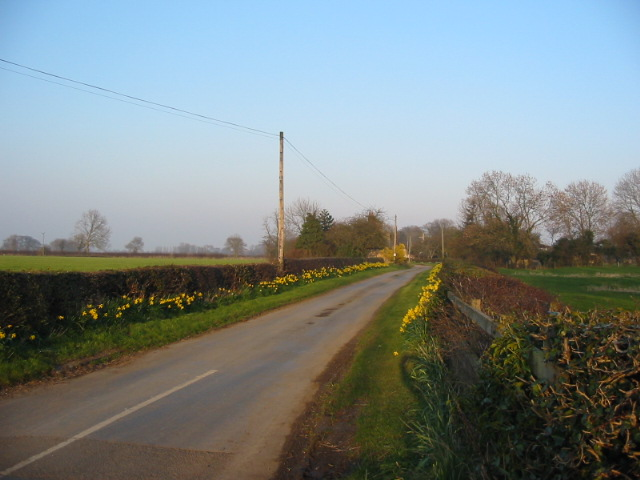
- Lane into Muscoates

- Location within North Yorkshire
- OS grid reference: SE687802
- Civil parish: Nunnington
- Unitary authority: North Yorkshire
- Ceremonial county: North Yorkshire
- Region: Yorkshire and the Humber
- Country: England
- Sovereign state: United Kingdom
- Post town: YORK
- Postcode district: YO62
- Police: North Yorkshire
- Fire: North Yorkshire
- Ambulance: Yorkshire
- UK Parliament: Thirsk and Malton

Muscoates is a hamlet and former civil parish, now in the parish of Nunnington, in North Yorkshire, England. It lies on the River Riccal, 4 miles (6 km) to the south of the town of Kirkbymoorside.

== Heritage ==
Muscoates is first mentioned in a 12th-century document. The name derives either from the Old English mūsa cotes, meaning "mouse-ridden cottages", or from an Old Norse personal name Músi. Muscoates was a township in the ancient parish of Kirkdale, and became a separate civil parish in 1866.

Muscoates was a small parish with an area of 1,045 acres (423 ha) and a population of 23 in 1961.

In 1974 it became part of the new district of Ryedale, and on 1 April 1986 the parish was abolished and merged with Nunnington. Ryedale was abolished in 2023 and the area is now administered by North Yorkshire Council.

== Singular writer ==
Sir Herbert Read, the poet and art critic, was born at Muscoates in 1893, the son of a farmer. His fantasy novel The Green Child (1935) was described by the critic Geoffrey Wheatcroft in 1993 as "singular, odd, completely original".
