= St Hilda's Church, Beadlam =

Church in Beadlam, North Yorkshire, England

Coordinates: 54°15′12″N 0°59′49″W

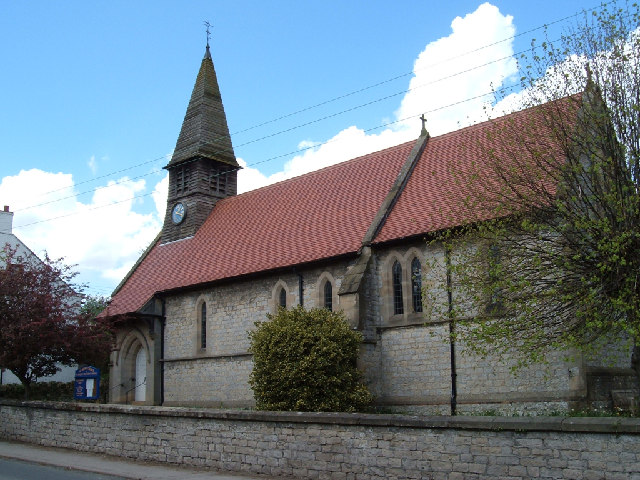
The church, in 2005

St Hilda's Church is the parish church of Beadlam, a village in North Yorkshire in England.

The church was constructed in 1882, to a design by Charles Hodgson Fowler. The church cost £1,119 13/6 to build. The bell tower was weatherboarded in 1961, and in 1997, the church was grade II listed.

The church is in the 13th century style, and is built of stone, with tiled roofs. It consists of a nave and chancel under a single roof, a south porch, north-east vestry, and a west tower containing a single bell. The belltower is built of wood, and has a pyramidal spire. The windows are all lancets, and the east window has stained glass designed by Kempe & Tower, which was added around 1905. Inside, there is an octagonal font in stone, and a monument to Lilian Duncombe, carved in 1905 by Lady Feodora Gleichen.

== See also ==
- Listed buildings in Beadlam
