= Listed buildings in Pockley =

Pockley is a civil parish in the county of North Yorkshire, England. It contains nine listed buildings that are recorded in the National Heritage List for England. All the listed buildings are designated at Grade II, the lowest of the three grades, which is applied to "buildings of national importance and special interest". The parish contains the village of Pockley and the surrounding countryside. The listed buildings consist of four cruck-framed cottages with thatched roofs, a boundary stone, two farmhouses and farm buildings, a church and a telephone kiosk.

== Buildings ==
Name and location	Photograph	Date	Notes
Daleside; 54.26437°N 1.02348°W		17th century (probable)	The cottage has a cruck-framed core, it is in whitewashed stone and has a thatched roof. There is a single storey and an attic, and three bays. The cottage contains a doorway and casement windows.
Moorings; 54.26340°N 1.02522°W		17th century (probable)	The cottage has a cruck-framed core, it is in limestone and sandstone, and has a thatched roof. There is a single storey and an attic, and four bays. The cottage contains a doorway and casement windows. Attached on the left is a byre with a pantile roof, containing a horizontally sliding sash window. Inside the cottage are a pair a full crucks and a pair of half-crucks.
West View Cottage; 54.26545°N 1.02321°W		17th century (probable)	The cottage has a cruck-framed core, it is in limestone, and has a thatched roof at the front and pantile at the rear. There is a single storey and an attic, and three bays, a small outshut on the left, and a barn in a rear cross wing. The cottage contains a doorway and casement windows, and inside is a surviving pair of crucks.
White Cottage; 54.26397°N 1.02492°W		1717	The cottage has a cruck-framed core, it is in whitewashed limestone, and has a thatched roof, hipped on the left. There is one storey, four bays, an extension to the right and a rear outshut. On the front is a mix of windows, including fixed windows, casements, horizontally sliding sashes, and a fire window. The entrance has been moved to the right return. Three pairs of internal crucks remain, two are full and one is a half-cruck.
Boundary stone 54.35764°N 1.06405°W		18th century	The boundary stone is in sandstone, and consists of a roughly tapering stone about 1.35 metres (4 ft 5 in) in height. The east face inscribed with "K", and the west face with "H".
Manor Farmhouse, barn and byre 54.26746°N 1.02241°W		Mid-18th century	The farmhouse and attached farm buildings are in limestone, and have pantile roofs with gable copings and shaped kneelers. The farmhouse has two storeys and two bays, the roofline of the left bay lower. It contains a doorway and horizontally sliding sash windows. To the left is a two-storey barn containing windows and slit vents, and to the right is a single-storey byre with slit vents.
St John the Baptist's Church; 54.26648°N 1.02295°W		1876–78	The church, designed by George Gilbert Scott Jr. is built in limestone with sandstone dressings and a Westmorland slate roof. It consists of a nave, a south porch, and a chancel with a north vestry. At the west end is a central buttress carrying a bellcote with four openings.
Hasty Bank Farmhouse; 54.28697°N 1.04166°W		Late 18th to early 19th century	The farmhouse is in sandstone and limestone, and has a pantile roof with gable copings and shaped kneelers. There are two storeys and three bays. On the front is a central doorway and horizontally-sliding sash windows.
Telephone kiosk 54.26583°N 1.02287°W		1935	The K6 type telephone kiosk was designed by Giles Gilbert Scott. Constructed in cast iron, it has a square plan and a dome, and there are three unperforated crowns in the top panels.
