= The Star Inn =

Listed gastropub in North Yorkshire, England

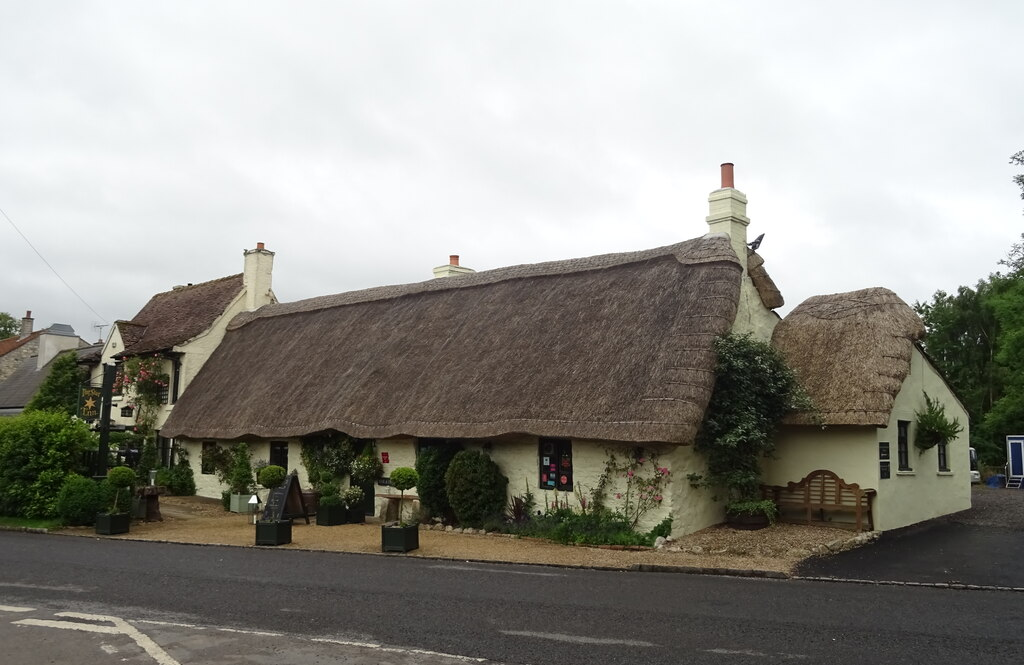
- The gastropub in 2020

- Location of the restaurant within North Yorkshire

Restaurant information
- Established: 1996; 30 years ago
- Owner: Andrew Pern
- Chef: Andrew Pern
- Rating: (Michelin Guide 2015)
- Location: High Street, Harome, North Yorkshire, England
- Coordinates: 54.231°N 1.0102°W
- Website: thestaratharome.co.uk

Listed Building – Grade II
- Official name: The Star Inn
- Designated: 4 January 1955
- Reference no.: 1315892

The Star Inn is a gastropub/restaurant on High Street in Harome, a village near Helmsley in North Yorkshire, England. The pub has been in the village since the 19th century and the building is thought to have been constructed in the 17th century, with earlier origins. It has been known for the quality of its food since the 1970s. The current owner is Andrew Pern who took over in 1996 originally with his then wife, Jacquie Pern. He has continued the tradition for quality food, gaining several awards. As of 2015, the restaurant holds one star in the Michelin Guide, an award it regained in 2014 having previously held it from 2002 to 2011.

The building was designated a Grade II listed building in January 1955. The pub was badly damaged by a fire in November 2021.

== Fire ==
On 24 November 2021, the roof of The Star Inn caught fire around 10 pm. Head chef and owner Andrew Pern told BBC Radio York that the thatched roof created a "perfect fuel" for a fire. The official Twitter account for the restaurant posted "We won't be open for a while as we are reduced to ashes with The Star on fire and still burning." It was estimated getting the restaurant back to business would take about a year. The fire was believed to be a case of arson. North Yorkshire Police said "A number of groups of people were in the area around the time of the fire, and police are urging anyone with information about the incident to contact them" or telephone Crimestoppers anonymously.

In September 2022, it was announced that The Star Inn would partially reopen from 1 October 2022. In August 2023, it was reported that a 28-year old man from Helmsley was due to appear in court charged with committing arson with recklessness as to whether property would be destroyed or life endangered. It was estimated that the arson caused £2 million worth of damage.

== Selected awards ==
- 2023 – Gastropub of the Year
- 2014 – One Michelin star
- 2008 – Pub Chef Awards – Gastropub of the Year
- 2006 – Egon Ronay's Guide Gastropub of the Year
- 2005 – The Good Pub Guide "Inn of the Year"

== See also ==
- Listed buildings in Harome
