= Listed buildings in Harome =

Harome is a civil parish in the county of North Yorkshire, England. It contains 13 listed buildings that are recorded in the National Heritage List for England. All the listed buildings are designated at Grade II, the lowest of the three grades, which is applied to "buildings of national importance and special interest". The parish contains the village of Harome and the surrounding countryside. Most of the listed buildings are houses and cottages, some with cruck-framed cores and thatched roofs, and the others include a watermill and attached house, a public house, a church and a vicarage.

== Buildings ==
Name and location	Photograph	Date	Notes
Mill Cottage; 54.22696°N 1.00867°W	—	17th century	The house has a cruck-framed core, with walls of whitewashed limestone and a thatched and pantile roof. There is one storey and an attic, and four bays. On the front is a doorway, a fire window and horizontally-sliding sash windows, and in the roof are two inserted dormers.
Orchard House; 54.23047°N 1.00605°W		17th century	The house has a cruck-framed core, with walls of limestone and a thatched roof. There is one storey and an attic, and three bays. On the front is a doorway and horizontally-sliding sash windows, and in the roof is a half-dormer. Inside, there are two pairs of crucks.
The Hollies; 54.22679°N 1.00856°W		17th century	The house, which was later extended, has a cruck-framed core, walls of whitewashed limestone and a thatched roof. The original part has one storey and two bays, and the extension to the left has two storeys and one bay. On the front is a doorway, and the windows are horizontally-sliding sashes.
The Star Inn; 54.23102°N 1.01020°W		17th century (probable)	A house, later a public house, with a cruck-framed core, walls of whitewashed stone, and a thatched roof with some pantile. There is one storey and an attic, five bays, and an outshut. In the centre is a stable door, and the windows are horizontally-sliding sashes. Inside, there is an inglenook seat, and in the attic is a pair of crucks.
White Cottage; 54.23087°N 1.00282°W		17th century (probable)	The cottage has a cruck-framed core, walls of whitewashed stone, and a thatched roof. There is one storey and an attic, and four bays. On the front are two doorways, and the windows are horizontally-sliding sashes. Inside, there is one pair of surviving crucks.
Cross House Farmhouse; 54.23144°N 1.01054°W		Late 18th century	The house is in limestone, and has a swept pantile roof with gable coping and shaped kneelers. There are two storeys, a front range of three bays, and a rear cross-wing and outshut. In the centre is a gabled porch, above which is a casement window, and the other windows are horizontally-sliding sashes.
Harome Mill, Mill House and lamp post 54.22681°N 1.00908°W		Late 18th century	The watermill and attached house are in limestone, sandstone and granite, and have a swept pantile roof with gable coping on the right. There are two storeys, and the house on the left has three bays. Its doorway has an oblong fanlight, the ground floor windows are casements, and in the upper floor they are sashes. The mill has a cart door and irregular fenestration. In the mill yard is a decorative wrought iron lamp post.
Headland Cottage; 54.23098°N 1.00347°W	—	Late 18th century	Two houses, later combined, in limestone with a swept pantile roof. The house has two storeys and two bays, with the gable end facing the street. There is one casement window in the ground floor, and the other windows are horizontally-sliding sashes. The ground floor openings have stone lintels, and in the upper floor the lintels are in wood.
Rutland House; 54.22998°N 1.00872°W	—	Late 18th century	The house is in limestone, with sandstone quoins, and a tile roof with gable coping and shaped kneelers. There are three storeys and three bays, and a rear projecting dairy. The doorway has a fanlight and a round-arched lintel, and the windows are sashes with lintels and keystones.
Shaw Moor Farmhouse; 54.24044°N 1.00416°W	—	Late 18th century	The house is in limestone, and has a swept pantile roof with gable coping and shaped kneelers. There are two storeys, three bays and a rear service wing. Above the doorway is a casement window, and the other windows are horizontally-sliding sashes.
Greystones Farmhouse; 54.23039°N 1.00666°W	—	Late 18th to early 19th century (probable)	The house is in limestone, and has a swept pantile roof with gable coping and shaped kneelers. There are two storeys and four bays, and a rear cross-wing. The windows are sashes.
St Saviour's Church; 54.23020°N 1.00884°W		1862	The church was designed by Charles Barry Junior in Early English style. It is built in limestone with some sandstone, and has a tile roof. The church consists of a five-bay nave, a south porch, and a two-bay chancel with a north vestry. At the west end are wide buttresses carrying an octagonal bellcote, and the windows are lancets.
The Vicarage; 54.22990°N 1.01007°W		1862	The vicarage is in limestone, with sandstone details, a tile roof with decorative ridge, and gables with bargeboards. There are two storeys, two gabled bays on the front, a double depth plan, and a service wing to the right. Between the gabled bays is a timber porch, and the windows are sashes.
