= Nawton Tower =

Country house in Nawton, North Yorkshire, England

Coordinates: 54°17′16″N 1°00′55″W

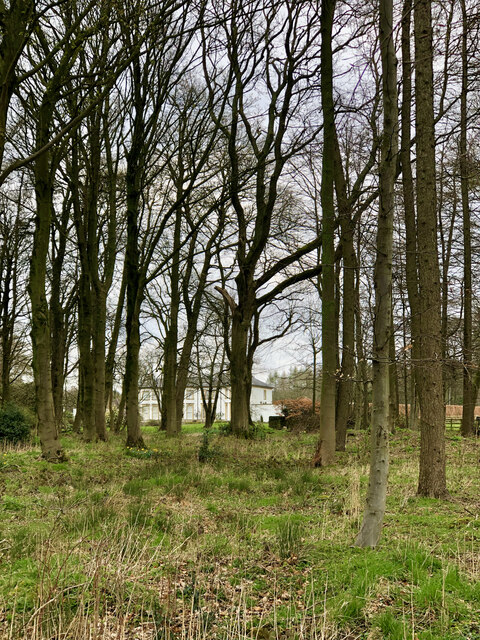
The building, in 2023

Nawton Tower is a country house in Nawton, North Yorkshire, a village in England.

The house was designed by Robert Richardson Banks and Charles Barry Jr. in the Gothic Revival style and completed in 1855. As originally built, it was a tall house with castellation. In 1930, it was heavily altered, reducing its height and removing the Gothic elements, to give it a neoclassical appearance. The tower's gardens retain several 18th-century features, including a portico and two temples which are all grade II listed, terrace and statues. There are formal walks and woodland including azaleas and rhododendrons.

The Doric Temple is a garden pavilion in sandstone with a semicircular plan. Shallow steps lead up to a Doric portico, distyle in antis, with a plain segmental pediment, and a hemispherical roof. Inside, there is hexagonal stone paving.

The Ionic Temple is built of limestone with a pantile roof and a rectangular plan. A flight of narrow steps leads up to an Ionic tetrastyle portico. This has piers with shaped imposts, and a richly carved pediment with a cartouche in voussoirs.

The Garden Portico is also built of limestone. It has a porch with two Ionic columns, a pulvinated frieze, a modillion cornice and a pediment. The door has panels of eight raised lozenges in octagonal surrounds in a plain doorframe.

== See also ==
- Listed buildings in Nawton, North Yorkshire
