= Harome Mill =

Mill building in Harome, North Yorkshire, England

Coordinates: 54.2268°N 1.0091°W

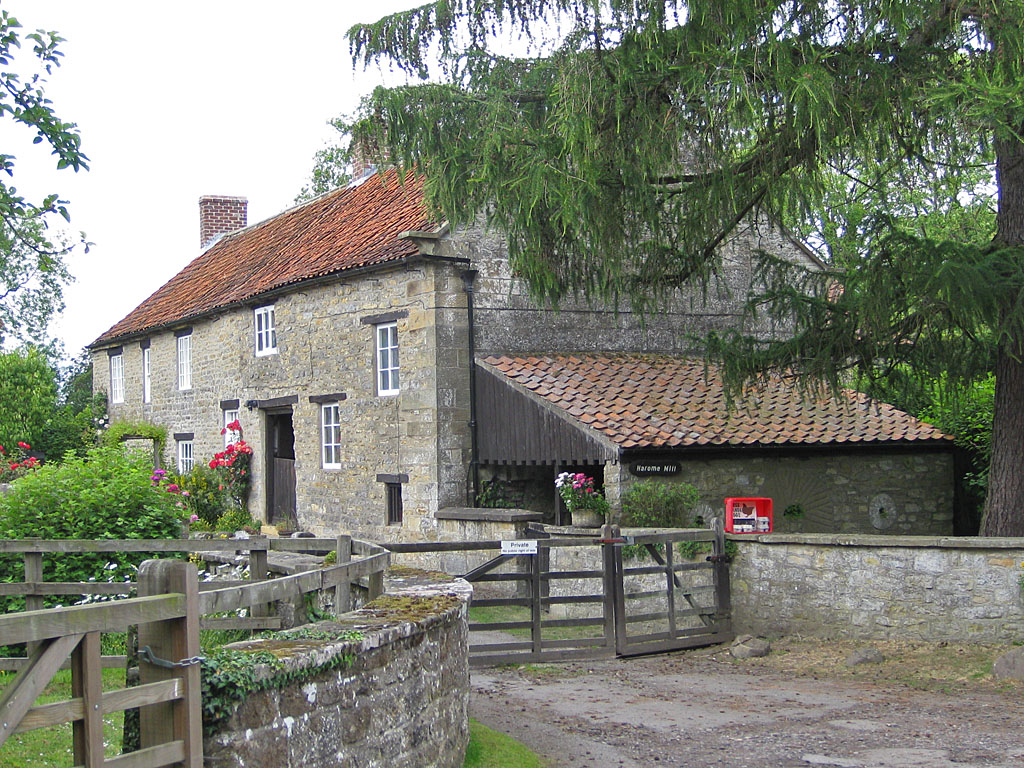
The building, in 2011

Harome Mill is a historic building in Harome, a village in North Yorkshire, in England.

In 1430, Harome was recorded as having two mills: a fulling mill, and a water mill used to grind corn. The current mill is probably on the same site as that corn mill, and dates from the late 18th century. The mill had a water turbine. It was recorded as working when it was grade II listed in 1955, but was later converted to residential use.

The watermill and attached house are built of limestone, sandstone and granite, and have a swept pantile roof with gable coping on the right. There are two storeys, and the house on the left has three bays. Its doorway has an oblong fanlight, the ground floor windows are casements, and in the upper floor they are sashes. The mill has a cart door and irregular fenestration. In the mill yard is a decorative wrought iron lamp post.

== See also ==
- Listed buildings in Harome
