= Ryedale School =

Academy school in Beadlam, North Yorkshire, England

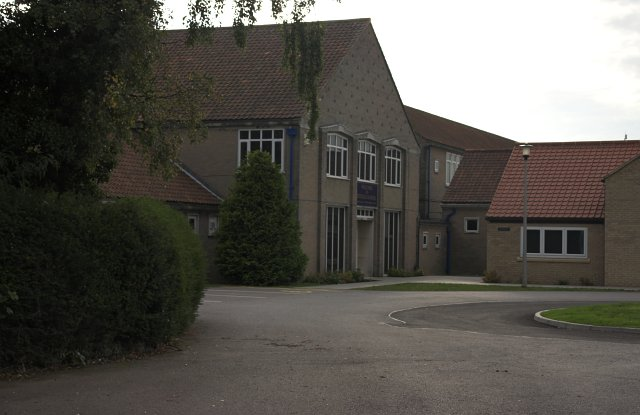

Location
- Gale Lane; Beadlam, North Yorkshire, YO62 7SL; England; 54.25100°N 0.99555°W

Information
- Type: Academy
- Established: 1953
- Local authority: North Yorkshire
- Department for Education URN: 148377 Tables
- Ofsted: Reports
- Secondary Director: Domenica Wilkinson
- Gender: Coeducational
- Age: 11 to 16
- Enrolment: 710
- Houses: Byland, Feversham, Mowbray, Rievaulx
- Colours: Blue, Red, Yellow, Green
- Website: Official website

Ryedale School, opened in 1953, is a coeducational secondary school located in Beadlam, North Yorkshire, England.

The school provides for pupils aged 11 to 16, and has a capacity enrolment of 750.

The school achieves higher than average GCSE results. In 2012 the school was inspected by Ofsted and was rated Grade 1 (outstanding) for overall effectiveness.

The school has represented both the County and Region at sport, music and interpretive dance; including National Youth Orchestras. Every year the school performs a carol service in the Church of All Saints, Helmsley.

Previously a community school administered by North Yorkshire County Council, in February 2021 Ryedale School converted to academy status.
