= Harome =

Village and civil parish in North Yorkshire, England

Coordinates: 54°13′49″N 1°00′29″W

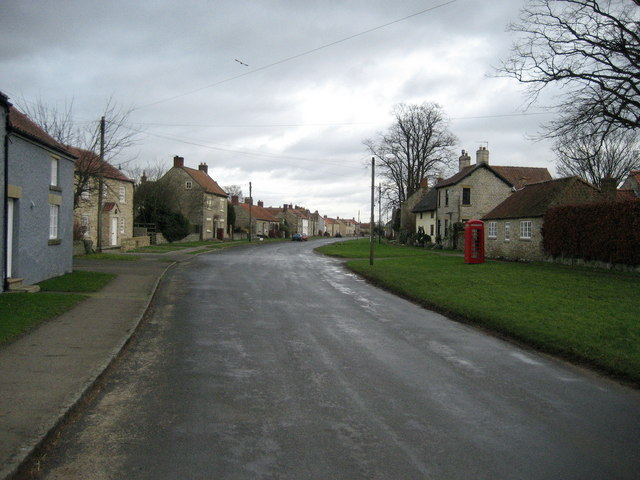
- The main street in the village of Harome heading eastwards

- Location within North Yorkshire
- Population: 261 (2011 census)
- Civil parish: Harome
- Unitary authority: North Yorkshire
- Ceremonial county: North Yorkshire
- Region: Yorkshire and the Humber
- Country: England
- Sovereign state: United Kingdom
- Post town: YORK
- Postcode district: YO62
- Dialling code: 01439
- Police: North Yorkshire
- Fire: North Yorkshire
- Ambulance: Yorkshire
- UK Parliament: Thirsk and Malton

Harome is a small village and civil parish in the county North Yorkshire, England, around 2 miles (3.2 km) south-east of the market town Helmsley, and 24 miles (39 km) north-east of York. The village has a population of 261 people according to the 2011 UK census, and a total land area of 102,680 square feet (9,539 m^{2}). It is situated to the east of the River Riccal.

It was part of the Ryedale district between 1974 and 2023. It is now administered by North Yorkshire Council.

The village has 109 households. Agriculture and retail are the two main employers. The name Harome simply means rocks/stones, and translates from old English meaning a heap of stones.

== History ==
Until the nineteenth century, the village was known as Harum. By 1900 it had transitioned through Harom to its modern-day name of Harome.

In the 1870s, Harome was described as:

"HARUM, or HAROME, a chapelry in Helmsley parish, N. R. Yorkshire; on the rivers Rye and Riccal, 2 miles SE by E of Helmsley, and 4 N of Hovingham r. station. Post town, Helmsley, under York. Acres, 2, 303. Real property, £3, 093. Pop., 447. Houses, 90." – John Marius Wilson (1870–72)

Population of Harome- 1881–2011

According to the UK census information, the population of Harome has decreased from 439 people in 1881 to 269 people between 1881 and 1961. More recently, the population has shown to be continually decreasing following the 2001 UK census falling to 252 people, however the 2011 census has shown an increase to 261 people- the first population increase since 1901.

Construction of the local church began in May 1861, on the site of a previously demolished building. St Saviour's Church, Harome was completed in August 1862, under the patronage of the Feversham Estate. The architect was Charles Barry Jr, whose father designed the Houses of Parliament. It was originally furnished by William Duncombe, who represented the North Riding of Yorkshire as a member of parliament between 1859 and 1867. The church contains glass from Hardman, and most recently a Millennium Cross produced by a local craftsman. Until 1863 Harome had been part of the parish of Helmsley.

Harome Methodist Church was built in 1909.

== Industry ==
The 1881 UK census recorded that Harome's industry was predominantly agriculturally based, with a total of 73 people working within agriculture, 71 of these were men. Domestic services was the second most popular occupation, with 15 people in total. There were also people within the parish who worked in other occupations such as dressmakers, textile fabrics and food and lodging, to name a few. The village also has Harome Mill, a listed water mill dating back to the late eighteenth century.

In recent times the residents of Harome have shifted away from more agriculturally based occupations, which has been shown in the UK 2011 census. However, skilled trades is still the most popular occupation throughout the parish, with 36 people within this line of work. A lot of people are now predominantly within a tertiary and quaternary based job, these include managers and directors, along with science researchers.

== Housing and transport ==
Harome is a quaint village with several listed buildings along a wide main street. In November 2021, the thatched roof of the Star Inn was destroyed by fire.

Harome has most recently been categorised as being a 'village surrounded by sparsely populated countryside' by the Office for National Statistics. The housing within Harome is typically detached and terraced housing, with the average house price for a detached house at £269,371.

There are 183 vehicles within Harome, with 52.3% of the population accounting for two or more cars or vans. There are four bus routes serving Harome, all are school services. The nearest railway station to Harome is Malton railway station, which is located 11 miles (18 km) away.

== Geography ==
Harome is situated 18.2 miles (29.3 km) north-east from York, and 191 miles (307 km) north from London.

According to the Office for National Statistics, the parish has a total land area of 102,680 square feet (9,539 m^{2}), of which 98,098.1 square feet (9,113.61 m^{2}) is areas of green space and 935.7 square feet (86.93 m^{2}) is areas of water. The River Riccal runs to the west of Harome and is met by many tributaries from the North York Moors.

=== Climate ===
Harome has a Maritime Temperate climate (Köppen climate classification Cfb) typical to the United Kingdom, characterised by cool summers and mild winters, due to a changeable and often overcast weather.

Climate data for Harome
Month	Jan	Feb	Mar	Apr	May	Jun	Jul	Aug	Sep	Oct	Nov	Dec	Year
Mean daily maximum °C (°F)	8 (46)	8 (46)	10 (50)	13 (55)	16 (61)	19 (66)	21 (70)	21 (70)	18 (64)	14 (57)	10 (50)	7 (45)	14 (57)
Mean daily minimum °C (°F)	1 (34)	1 (34)	2 (36)	3 (37)	6 (43)	9 (48)	11 (52)	11 (52)	9 (48)	6 (43)	3 (37)	1 (34)	5 (42)
Average precipitation mm (inches)	53 (2.1)	34 (1.3)	43 (1.7)	56 (2.2)	49 (1.9)	69 (2.7)	55 (2.2)	69 (2.7)	44 (1.7)	64 (2.5)	56 (2.2)	53 (2.1)	645 (25.3)

== See also ==
- Listed buildings in Harome
