= Pockley =

Village and civil parish in North Yorkshire, England

Coordinates: 54°16′02″N 1°01′22″W

- Location within North Yorkshire
- Population: 112 (2011 census)
- OS grid reference: SE637860
- Unitary authority: North Yorkshire
- Ceremonial county: North Yorkshire
- Region: Yorkshire and the Humber
- Country: England
- Sovereign state: United Kingdom
- Post town: YORK
- Postcode district: YO62
- Police: North Yorkshire
- Fire: North Yorkshire
- Ambulance: Yorkshire
- UK Parliament: Thirsk and Malton

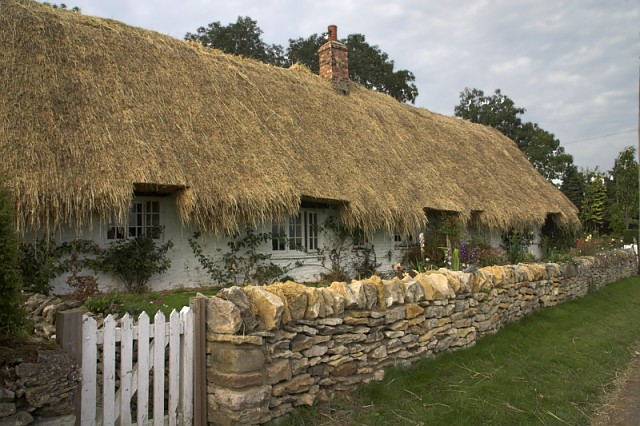
White Cottage at Pockley, rethatching almost complete in 2007

Pockley is a small village and civil parish in North Yorkshire, England. It is about 1 mile north-east of Helmsley turning north from the A170 road. Its short, winding lane passes six thatched cottages in a quarter mile before turning back toward the A170 and its junction at Beadlam and Nawton.

From 1974 to 2023 it was part of the district of Ryedale. It is now administered by the unitary North Yorkshire Council.

The Grade II-listed St John the Baptist's Church was built in 1870 and designed by Sir Gilbert Scott or his son.

The name Pockley probably derives from the Old English Pocalēah, meaning 'Poca's wood or clearing'.

== See also ==
- Listed buildings in Pockley
