= Nawton, North Yorkshire =

Village and civil parish in North Yorkshire, England

Coordinates: 54°15′17″N 0°59′38″W

Nawton
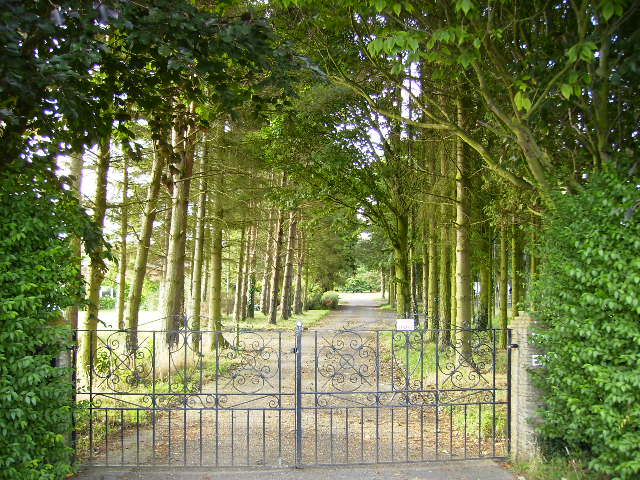
- Far End in Nawton

- Location within North Yorkshire
- Population: 569 (2011 census)
- OS grid reference: SE855878
  - London: 245 mi (394 km) south
- Unitary authority: North Yorkshire
- Ceremonial county: North Yorkshire
- Region: Yorkshire and the Humber
- Country: England
- Sovereign state: United Kingdom
- Post town: YORK
- Postcode district: YO62
- Dialling code: 01439
- Police: North Yorkshire
- Fire: North Yorkshire
- Ambulance: Yorkshire

Nawton population graph

Nawton is a village and civil parish in North Yorkshire, England. It is situated on the A170 road, almost adjoining Beadlam, three miles west of Kirkbymoorside. There are two Methodist chapels on the south side of the village. It had a population of 569 according to the 2011 census. The origin of the name Nawton derives from pre-7th century words "nafola" meaning a hollow, and "tun" settlement.

In the 1870s, John Marius Wilson's Imperial Gazetteer of England and Wales described Nawton as:

A township that comprises 1,200 acres. Real property, £1,899. Pop., 358. Houses, 83. The manor belongs to F. Barr, Esq. Nawton Tower is a castellated mansion, stands on a rising-ground, and commands extensive views.

From 1974 to 2023 it was part of the district of Ryedale, it is now administered by the unitary North Yorkshire Council.

== History ==
Nawton is mentioned in the original Domesday Book. In 1086 it states that there were 21 villagers, 40 acres of meadows and 12 ploughlands, all of which in the grounds of the manor with a total value of £5. Land at Nawton was then held by the Archbishop of York, and as late as 1831 part of Nawton was still in the liberty of St Peter's, York.

In 1086 Nawton was a berewick of Kirkbymoorside, but was later a township of the parish of Kirkdale.

In 1333 William de Broklesby, clerk, gave two ploughlands and houses in Nawton and other places to William son of Richard de Nawton, with the remainder to John de Nawton and his heirs. Thomas Nawton of Eddlethorpe, in 1515, left Elizabeth Nawton, his sister, Prioress of Neasham, the properties of Nawton and Nawtondale. He died in 1519 and left a son and heir Henry. Henry died about 1547 with the manor being seised from him. He left four young daughters, Agnes, Elizabeth, Eleanor and Katharine, the first three married respectively Thomas Harwood, George Constable and Francis Conyers. Sir Roger Lascelles of Sowerby was a guardian of these daughters, but he died in 1551 and his manor was "seised" (transferred as an ownership unit). Thomas Sayvell and Cecilia his wife in 1560 gave the manor of Nawtondale to Robert Thornton (of East Newton), and William his son and heir. George and Elizabeth Constable and Francis and Eleanor Conyers also made a transfer of the manor in 1570. In 1617 William Thornton of East Newton died seised of Nawton Manor, in 1666 Clement and Barbara Read and were in possession of the manor. A Clement and Elizabeth Read and held it in 1698 and in 1708 gave it to William Whitehead. In 1744 Thomas Whitehead was the lord appointed gamekeeper. William Whitehead was lord in 1779, Thomas Whitehead in 1816, Francis Barr in 1857–72, W. F. Shepherd in 1879.

In 1866 Nawton became a separate civil parish, but remains part of the ecclesiastical parish of Kirkdale.

== Railway station ==
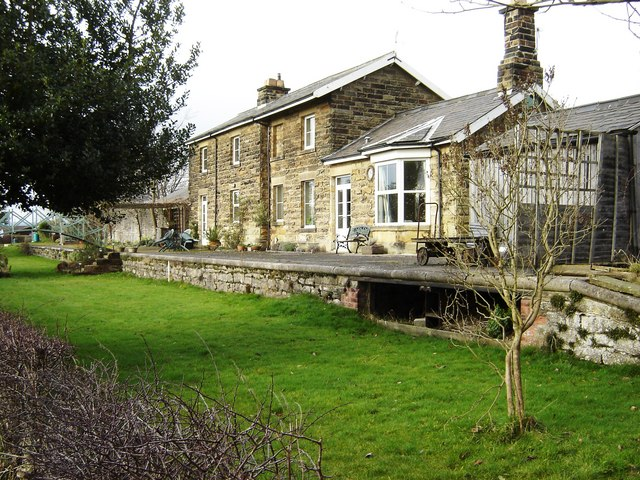
Nawton disused railway station

Nawton railway station was opened on 1 January 1874. The single platformed station was used in the 1940s as a buffer food depot for the Second World War. Although closed to passengers in 1953, the station saw irregular passenger use until 3 May 1964 with excursion trains such as ramblers, shopping and football excursions. The last train to leave the station was a ramblers' excursion to Kirbymoorside.

== Education ==
The Nawton Community Primary School was built in 1965, to the north of the A170, at the top of School Lane, close to the southern border of the North York Moors National Park. Ryedale School, opened in 1953, is located in Gale Lane and provides mixed comprehensive secondary education for 11–16-year-olds.

== Places of interest ==
Nawton Tower has gardens which are associated with a country house. Features include an 18th-century garden portico, terraces, statuary, and formal walks. Nawton Tower was first created in the 18th century. The house dates back to the mid-19th century and the gardens to the 18th–20th centuries.

== See also ==
- Listed buildings in Nawton, North Yorkshire
