= Beadlam =

Village and civil parish in North Yorkshire, England

Coordinates: 54.25331°N 0.99923°W

- Location within North Yorkshire
- Population: 229 (2011 census)
- OS grid reference: SE653846
- Civil parish: Beadlam
- Unitary authority: North Yorkshire
- Ceremonial county: North Yorkshire
- Region: Yorkshire and the Humber
- Country: England
- Sovereign state: United Kingdom
- Post town: YORK
- Postcode district: YO62
- Police: North Yorkshire
- Fire: North Yorkshire
- Ambulance: Yorkshire
- UK Parliament: Thirsk and Malton

Beadlam is a village and civil parish in North Yorkshire, England. According to the 2001 census it had a population of 250, reducing to 229 at the Census 2011. It is situated about 10 miles (16 km) west of Pickering, near the southern boundary of the North York Moors National Park. Beadlam is halfway between Helmsley and Kirkbymoorside on the A170.

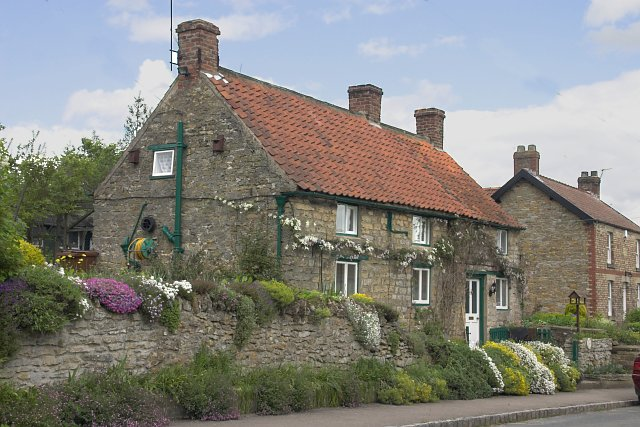
A cottage in Beadlam

The name Beadlam derives from the plural form of the Old English bōðl meaning 'a dwelling'.

The village is unusual in that it is directly joined onto another village, Nawton, and is commonly given the name Nawton Beadlam. The village has a secondary school, Ryedale School, and Nawton has a primary school, Nawton Primary School.

The village has a fish and chip shop, which is popular with the students returning from Ryedale School, and a bus stop operated by the East Yorkshire bus service which provides connections to most of North Yorkshire including major cities and coastal towns in the area including York, Scarborough and Bridlington.

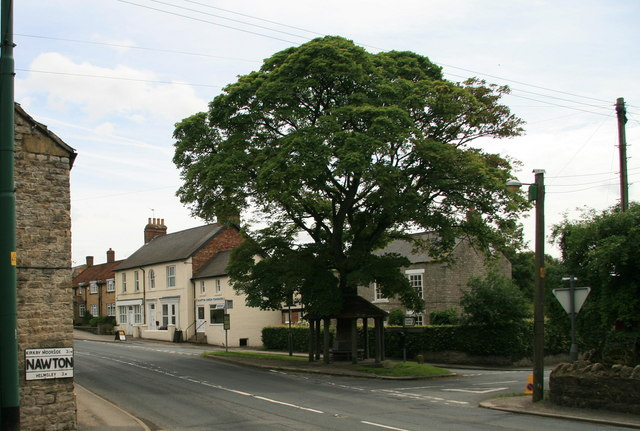
Nawton and Beadlam bus shelter and fish and chip shop

Beadlam was historically a township in the ancient parish of Kirkdale. It became a separate civil parish in 1866, but remains part of the ecclesiastical parish of Kirkdale. St Gregory's Minster, the parish church in Kirkdale, has been in use since before the Norman Conquest. Its daughter church, St Hilda's Church, Beadlam, was built in 1882–3. It serves as the church of a local Ecumenical Partnership between Methodists and Anglicans.

Between 1974 and 2023 the village was part of the Ryedale district. It is now administered by the unitary North Yorkshire Council.

Two miles (3.2 km) west of the village is Beadlam Roman villa, which was excavated in 1969 revealing two 4th-century rectangular buildings, the northernmost of which was fitted with a hypocaust overlain by a tessellated floor.

== See also ==
- Listed buildings in Beadlam
